= J Dilla discography =

Discography by J Dilla

- Studio albums: 9
- Extended plays: 9
- Guest appearances: 17

The discography of American hip hop recording artist J Dilla, consists of nine studio albums, nine EPs, and 17 guest appearances.

== Albums ==
=== Studio albums ===
List of studio albums, with selected chart positions
Title	Album details	Peak chart positions	
Title	Album details	US R&B	US Ind.
Welcome 2 Detroit	Released: February 27, 2001; Label: Barely Breaking Even; Format: CD, LP	—	—
Champion Sound (with Madlib, as Jaylib)	Released: October 7, 2003; Label: Stones Throw; Format: CD, LP	92	22
Donuts	Released: February 7, 2006; Label: Stones Throw; Format: CD, LP	—	21
"—" denotes a recording that did not chart or was not released in that territory.

=== Posthumous albums ===
List of posthumous studio albums, with selected chart positions
Title	Album details	Peak chart positions			
Title	Album details	US	US Rap	US R&B	US Ind
The Shining	Released: August 22, 2006; Label: Barely Breaking Even; Format: CD, LP	103	—	35	9
Jay Love Japan	Released: June 26, 2007; Label: Pay Jay Productions; Format: CD, LP	—	—	—	—
Jay Stay Paid	Released: June 2, 2009; Label: Nature Sounds; Format: CD, LP	96	15	33	—
Rebirth of Detroit	Released: June 12, 2012	—	—	—	—
Dillatronic	Released: October 30, 2015; Label: Vintage Vibez Music Group	—	—	—	—
The Diary	Released: April 15, 2016; Label: Mass Appeal, Pay Jay Productions; Format: CD, LP	77	5	6	7
Dillagence 2 (with Busta Rhymes)	Released: August 25, 2026; Label: The Conglomerate; Format: CD, LP	—	—	—	—
"—" denotes a recording that did not chart or was not released in that territory.

== Extended plays ==
List of extended plays, with selected chart positions
Title	EP details	Peak chart positions			
Title	EP details	US	US Rap	US R&B	US Ind
Vol. 1: Unreleased	Released: October 1, 2002; Label: Bling 47; Format: CD, LP	—	—	—	—
Vol. 2: Vintage	Released: January 1, 2003; Label: Bling 47; Format: CD, LP	—	—	—	—
Ruff Draft	Released: February 25, 2003; Label: Mummy Records; Format: CD, LP	112	23	44	9
"—" denotes a recording that did not chart or was not released in that territory.

=== Posthumous extended plays ===
List of posthumous extended plays
Title	Album details
Donuts EP: J. Rocc's Picks	Released: March 13, 2006; Label: Stones Throw; Format: CD, LP
Donut Shop	Released: June 11, 2010; Label: Stones Throw, Pay Jay Productions; Format: CD, LP
Dillatroit	Released: May 25, 2012
The Lost Scrolls Vol. 1	Released: February 5, 2013
Diamonds & Ice	Released: August 27, 2013
Give 'Em What They Want	Released: May 20, 2014

== Guest appearances ==
Title	Year	Artist(s)	Album
"That Shit"	1998	Funkmaster Flex, A Tribe Called Quest	The Mix Tape, Vol. III
"Supa Shit"	1999	Que. D	Quite Delicious
"There's a War Going On"	2004	Wale Oyejide	One Day... Everything Changed
"Niggaz Know"	2004	Pete Rock	Soul Survivor II
"Door"	2004	Phat Kat, Black Milk	The Undeniable
"Reunion"	2004	Slum Village	Detroit Deli (A Taste of Detroit)
"Push"	2005	MED	Push Comes to Shove
"We Gangstas"	2005	Diamond D, Nottz	The Diamond Mine
"Love"	2005	Lawless Element	Soundvision: In Stereo
"Words From Dilla"	2005	Lawless Element	Soundvision: In Stereo
Act Like You Know"	2005	Platinum Pied Pipers	Triple P
"Thrilla"	2005	Sa-Ra	The Hollywood Recordings
"Game Over"	2006	Dabrye, Phat Kat	Two/Three
"Music for Life"	2006	Hi-Tek, Nas, Common, Marsha, Busta Rhymes	Hi-Teknology²: The Chip
"Scheming"	2010	Slum Village, De La Soul, Phife	Villa Manifesto
"2000 Beyond"	2010	Slum Village, Questlove	Villa Manifesto

== See also ==
- Love for Sale (Bilal album), an unreleased album by Bilal, for which J Dilla assisted in producing
