= J Dilla production discography =

The following list is a discography of production by J Dilla (also credited as Jay Dee), an American hip hop record producer and recording artist from Detroit, Michigan. It includes a list of songs produced, co-produced and remixed by year, artist, album and title.

== Singles produced ==
Title	Year	Peak chart positions					Album
Title	Year	US	US R&B	US Rap	SCO	UK	Album
"Drop" (The Pharcyde)	1995	93	73	5	—	—	Labcabincalifornia
"Runnin'" (The Pharcyde)	1995	55	35	6	59	36	Labcabincalifornia
"A Day Wit The Homiez" / "Front Street" (1st Down)	1995	—	–	—	—	–	A Day Wit The Homiez
"Stakes Is High" (De La Soul)	1996	—	53	—	—	55	Stakes Is High
"1nce Again" (A Tribe Called Quest)	1996	—	38	—	70	34	Beats, Rhymes and Life
"Stressed Out" (A Tribe Called Quest featuring Faith Evans)	1996	—	56	15	33	81	Beats, Rhymes and Life
"Find A Way" (A Tribe Called Quest)	1998	71	29	18	75	41	The Love Movement
"I Don't Know" / "Eyes Up" (Slum Village)	1998	—	—	—	—	—	Fantastic, Vol. 2
"Get Dis Money" (Slum Village)	1999	—	—	—	—	—	Fantastic, Vol. 2
"Bend Ova" (Phife Dawg)	1999	—	—	—	—	—	Ventilation: Da LP
"Breathe and Stop" (Q-Tip)	2000	71	21	—	—	12	Amplified
"Let's Ride" (Q-Tip)	2000	—	—	—	—	–	Amplified
"The Light" (Common)	2000	44	12	13	—	56	Like Water for Chocolate
"The Light (Remix)" (Common featuring Erykah Badu)	2000	–	–	–	–	–	Bamboozled Soundtrack
"Players" / "Raise It Up" (Slum Village)	2000	—	—	—	—	–	Fantastic, Vol. 2
"Climax (Girl Sh*t)" / "CB4" (Slum Village)	2000	—	—	—	—	—	Fantastic, Vol. 2
"Let's Grow" Royce Da 5'9"	2000	–	–	–	—	—	Lyricist Lounge 2
"Didn't Cha Know" (Erykah Badu)	2001	113	28	—	—	—	Mama's Gun
"Thru Ya City" (De La Soul featuring D.V. Alias Khrist)	2001	—	—	—	—	—	Art Official Intelligence: Mosaic Thump
"Fuck the Police" (Jay Dee)	2001	—	—	—	—	—	The Diary
"The Red" (Jaylib)	2003	—	—	—	—	—	Champion Sound
"Much More" (De La Soul)	2003	—	—	—	—	85	The Grind Date
"Shoomp" (De La Soul featuring Sean Paul)	2003	—	—	—	—	85	The Grind Date
"Come Close (Remix) (Closer)" (Common featuring Pharrell, Q-Tip, and Erykah Badu)	2003	–	–	–	–	–	Electric Circus
"Move" (Q-Tip)	2008	—	—	—	—	—	The Renaissance
"House of Flying Daggers" (Raekwon featuring GZA, Method Man, Inspectah Deck, and Ghostface Killah)	2009	—	—	—	—	—	Only Built 4 Cuban Linx... Pt. II
"Gazzillion Ear" (MF Doom)	2009	—	—	—	—	—	Born Like This
"HER Love" (Common featuring Daniel Caesar)	2019	—	—	—	—	—	Let Love
"Nutshell Pt. 2" (Phife Dawg featuring Busta Rhymes and Redman)	2021	—	—	—	—	—	Forever
"—" denotes a recording that did not chart or was not released in that territory.

== Albums produced ==
Albums entirely produced or co-produced by J Dilla
Album	Year	Artist
Fan-Tas-Tic (Vol. 1)	1997 (Note: Fan-Tas-Tic (Vol. 1) was completed and subsequently bootlegged in February 1997.)	Slum Village
The Love Movement (Note: 8 of the album's 15 original songs were listed in the credits as being "initiated by JD of The Ummah and finished off by all of us")	1998	A Tribe Called Quest
Amplified	1999	Q-Tip
Fantastic, Vol. 2	2000	Slum Village
Like Water For Chocolate (Note: Jay Dee is credited as either a producer or co-producer on 11 of the album's 16 tracks, as well as 1 non-album remix single)	2000	Common
Welcome 2 Detroit	2001	J Dilla
Electric Circus (Note: J Dilla is credited as co-producer on 8 of the album's 13 tracks, as well as 1 non-album remix single)	2002	Common
Champion Sound (Note: J Dilla is credited as producer on roughly half of the album's tracklist, the other half being produced by Madlib and featuring J Dilla as a rapper)	2003	Jaylib
48 Hours	2003 (Note: 48 Hours was set for release in 2003, but was later shelved by MCA Records.)	Frank n Dank
Donuts	2006	J Dilla
The Shining (Note: This album was produced nearly in full by J Dilla, with Madlib contributing one track and Karriem Riggins contributing co-production and overseeing its completelion after Dilla had passed away in February 2006)	2006	J Dilla

== 1993 ==
=== T.H.I.Q.U.E. – Sweet One (VLS) ===
- "Sweet One (R&B Version)"
- "Sweet One (Jazzy Sax Mix)"
- "Sweet One (Rap Version)"

== 1994 ==
=== Da Enna C – Throw Ya Hands in the Air (VLS) ===
- "Now (Freestyle Session)"

=== Da Enna C – True To Rap (EP) ===
- "True To Rap" Remix _{(produced with DJ Dez)}
- "Pack Da House" _{(performed by Natives from Da' Unda'Ground)}

== 1995 ==
=== Poe – Hello ===
- 8. "Fingertips" _{(additional production with RJ Rice and Lionel Cole)}

=== The Pharcyde – Labcabincalifornia ===
- 1. "Bullshit"
- 4. "Runnin'"
- 6. "Splattitorium"
- 7. "Somethin' That Means Somethin'"
- 9. "Drop"
- 11. "Y?" _{(produced with Bootie Brown)}

=== The Pharcyde – Drop (VLS) ===
- B1. "Runnin' (Jay Dee Remix)"
- B2. "Y? (Be Like That) (Jay Dee Remix)"
- B3. “She Said” (Jay Dee Remix)

=== Little Indian – One Little Indian (VLS) ===
- A3. "One Little Indian (Jaydee's *Hit Remix)"

=== 1st Down – A Day wit the Homiez (VLS) ===
- A2. "A Day wit the Homiez"
- B2. "Front Street"

=== Natives From Da Unda'ground - Watcha' Gonna Do for Me (EP) ===
- A2. "Pack da House"
- B1. "Brotha's Juss Don't Know"

== 1996 ==
=== Brian Alexander Morgan and Joyce Martin – Do What You Gotta Do (VLS) ===
A1. "Do What You Gotta Do" _{(produced with Brian Alexander Morgan)}

=== Proof – Anywhere EP ===
- B2. "Vibe Session (Part 1)"

=== – Detroit Hip Hop Volume One ===
- B1. "Da Science"

=== The Pharcyde – She Said (VLS) ===
- A2. "She Said (Jay-Dee Remix)"

=== Mad Skillz – From Where??? ===
- 2. "It's Goin' Down"
- 11. "The Jam"

=== Busta Rhymes – The Coming ===
- 10. "Still Shining"
- 11. "Keep It Movin'" (featuring Leaders of the New School)

=== – Woo Hah!! Got You All in Check (VLS) ===
- A3. "Woo Hah!! Got You All in Check (The Jay-Dee Bounce Remix)"
- B4. "Woo Hah!! Got You All in Check (The Jay-Dee Other Shit Remix)"

=== – It's a Party (VLS) ===
- A3. "It's a Party" (Remix) [feat. Zhane]
- B4. "Ill Vibe" (Remix) [feat. Q-Tip]

=== De La Soul – Stakes Is High ===
- 16. "Stakes Is High" _{(produced with De La Soul)}

=== – Itzsoweezee (Hot) (VLS) ===
- B1. "Stakes Is High (Remix)" [featuring Mos Def and Truth Enola]

=== Various Artists – Get on the Bus: Music from and Inspired by the Motion Picture ===
- 4. "The Remedy" – A Tribe Called Quest & Common

=== A Tribe Called Quest – Beats, Rhymes and Life ===
_{(produced with The Ummah)}

- 2. "Get a Hold"
- 7. "1nce Again" (featuring Tammy Lucas)
- 10. "Keeping It Moving"
- 14. "Word Play" (featuring Consequence)
- 15. "Stressed Out (A Tribe Called Quest song)" (featuring Faith Evans)

=== Various Artists – NFL Jams ===
- 3. "When the Cheering Stops" – AZ, Ray Buchanan and Scott Galbraith _{(produced with Rick St. Hilaire)}
- 9. "Game Day" – Phife Dawg & Rodney Hampton

=== Keith Murray – Enigma ===
- 5. "Dangerous Ground" (featuring 50 Grand)
- 13. "The Rhyme (Slum Village Remix)"

=== 5-Elementz – Yester Years ===
- 1. "Searchin'"
- 2. "Feed Back"
- 3. "Janet Jacme"
- 4. "Don't Stop"
- 5. "Sun Flower"

=== The Katz- Come Fly with Me (EP) ===
- A2. "Funny"
- A3. "I Dream for You"
- A5. "Happy Dayz"

=== Trüz – True Dawgs (EP) ===
- 1. "True Dawgs (Street)"
- 3. "Routes to Hell"

== 1997 ==
=== Janet Jackson – Got 'Til It's Gone (VLS) ===
- "Got 'Til It's Gone (Ummah Jay Dee's Revenge Mix)"

=== Brand New Heavies – Sometimes (VLS) ===
- "Sometimes (Remix)" [feat. Q-Tip]

=== Slum Village – Fan-Tas-Tic (Vol. 1) ===
- All tracks

=== A Tribe Called Quest – The Jam EP ===
- 3. "Mardi Gras at Midnight" (featuring Rah Digga)

=== Somethin' for the People – All I Do (VLS) ===
- A1. "All I Do (Jay Dee's Shit! Mix)" [featuring Phife Dawg]

=== Crustation – Purple (CDS) ===
- 2. "Purple (A Tribe Called Quest Edit)"

=== Busta Rhymes – When Disaster Strikes... ===
- 06. "So Hardcore"

== 1998 ==
=== Mood – Snake Backs VLS ===
- Secrets of the Sand (Remix)"

=== Funkmaster Flex – The Mix Tape, Vol. III ===
- 26. "That Shit" (feat. A Tribe Called Quest & Jay Dee)

=== A Tribe Called Quest – The Love Movement ===
_{(produced with The Ummah)}

- 1. "Start It Up"
- 2. "Find a Way"
- 3. "Da Booty"
- 4. "Steppin' It Up" (featuring Busta Rhymes & Redman)
- 7. "4 Moms" (featuring Spanky)
- 8. "His Name Is Mutty Ranks"
- 11. "Busta's Lament" _{(produced with Bay-Lloyd)}
- 13. "Against the World"

=== 5-Elementz – The Album Time Forgot ===
- 2. "Whutchawant"
- 3. "Feed Back" _{{released in 1996}}
- 4. "Rockshows"
- 7. "Party Groove"
- 8. "Janet Jacme" _{{released in 1996}}
- 11. "E.G.O."
- 12. "Don't Stop" _{{released in 1996}}
- 14. "Searchin'" _{{released in 1996}}

=== Bizarre – Attack of the Weirdos ===
- 6. "Butterfly"

=== DJ Q and Philpot – Heartbreak Hotel ===
- B2. "F.A.C."

=== N'Dea Davenport – Bullshittin' (VLS) ===
- A1. "Bullshittin' (Remix)" [featuring Mos Def]
- B3. "Whatever You Want (Remix)"

== 1999 ==
=== Que D – Quite Delicious ===
- All tracks

=== The Brand New Heavies – Saturday Night (VLS) ===
- A1. "Saturday Night (Jay Dee Remix)" [featuring Mos Def]

=== Macy Gray – I Try (VLS) ===
- B1. "I Try" (Jaydee Remix)

=== Heavy D – Heavy ===
- 4. "Listen" (featuring Q-Tip)

=== Q-Tip – Amplified ===
_{(produced with Q-Tip)}

- 1. "Wait Up"
- 2. "Higher"
- 3. "Breathe and Stop" _{(produced by J Dilla)}
- 4. "Moving with U"
- 5. "Let's Ride"
- 6. "Things U Do"
- 7. "All In"
- 8. "Go Hard"
- 10. "Vivrant Thing" _{(produced by Q-Tip)}
- 12. "End of Time" (featuring Korn)
- 13. "Do It, See It, Be It"

=== Phife Dawg – Bend Ova (VLS) ===
- B1. "Thought U Wuz Nice"

=== 5 Ela – 5-E Pt. 3 ===
- 4. "You Ain't Fresh"
- 6. "Ain't No Love (Dirty Love)"

=== Phat Kat – Dedication to the Suckers (VLS) ===
- A1. "Dedication to the Suckers"
- A3. "Don't Nobody Care About Us"
- B1. "Microphone Master"

=== The Roots – Things Fall Apart ===
- 6. "Dynamite!" (featuring Rehani Sayeed)
- 18. "New Year's @ Jay Dee" {Bonus Track}

=== Nine Yards – Always Find a Way (VLS) ===
- B1. "Always Find a Way (Jay Dee Remix)"

=== Zooco - Grow-Mellow-Fellow ===
- 1. "Butterfly" (featuring T3)

== 2000 ==
=== Various Artists – The Hurricane (soundtrack) ===
- 2. "Little Brother" – Black Star

=== J-88 – Best Kept Secret ===
- All tracks

=== Common – Like Water for Chocolate ===
- 1. "Time Travelin' (A Tribute to Fela)" (featuring Vinia Mojica, Roy Hargrove and Femi Kuti) _{(produced with D'Angelo, Questlove, and James Poyser)}
- 2. "Heat"
- 4. "Dooinit"
- 5. "The Light"
- 6. "Funky for You" (featuring Bilal and Jill Scott) _{(produced with James Poyser)}
- 7. "The Questions" (featuring Mos Def) _{(produced with James Poyser)}
- 8. "Time Travelin' (Reprise)" _{(produced with D'Angelo, Questlove, and James Poyser)}
- 10. "A Film Called (Pimp)" (featuring Bilal and MC Lyte)
- 11. "Nag Champa (Afrodisiac for the World)"
- 12. "Thelonius" (featuring Slum Village)
- 13. "Payback Is a Grandmother"

=== Various Artists – Bamboozled (soundtrack) ===
_{(produced with Questlove & James Poyser)}

- 8. "The Light (Remix)" - Common (featuring Erykah Badu)

=== Slum Village – Fantastic, Vol. 2 ===
- All tracks
  - 7. "Tell Me" (featuring D'Angelo) _{(produced with D'Angelo)}
  - 15. "Once Upon a Time" (featuring Pete Rock) _{(produced with Pete Rock)}

=== Busta Rhymes – Anarchy ===
- 3. "Enjoy Da Ride"
- 7. "Live It Up"
- 10. "Show Me What You Got"

=== De La Soul – Art Official Intelligence: Mosaic Thump ===
- 5. "Thru Ya City" (featuring D.V. Alias Khrist)

=== Phife Dawg – Ventilation: Da LP ===
- 08. "Bend Ova"
- 11. "4 Horsemen (192 N' It)" [featuring Know Naim]

=== Erykah Badu – Mama's Gun ===
- 2. "Didn't Cha Know" _{(produced with Erykah Badu)}
- 3. "My Life" _{(produced with Erykah Badu and James Poyser)}
- 8. "Kiss Me on My Neck (Hesi)" _{(produced with Erykah Badu and James Poyser)}

=== Guru – Guru's Jazzmatazz, Vol. 3: Streetsoul ===
- 5. "Certified" (featuring Bilal)

=== Various Artists – Lyricist Lounge 2 ===
- 6. "Let's Grow" – Royce da 5'9"

=== Spacek – Eve (VLS) ===
- 2. Eve (JayDee Mix) [featuring Frank'n'Dank]

== 2001 ==
=== Jay Dee – Welcome 2 Detroit ===
- All tracks
  - 4. "The Clapper" (featuring Blu) _{(produced with Karriem Riggins)}

=== Jay Dee – Fuck the Police (VLS) ===
- A1. "Fuck the Police"
- A4. "Move"

=== Bilal – 1st Born Second ===
- 4. "Reminisce" (featuring Mos Def and Common)

=== Chino XL – I Told You So ===
- 17. "Don't Say a Word"
- 23. "How It Goes" (featuring Saafir)

=== Busta Rhymes – Genesis ===
- 5. "Genesis"
- 15. "Make It Hurt"

=== De La Soul – AOI: Bionix ===
- 16. "Peer Pressure" (featuring B-Real and J Dilla)

=== Que D – In Yo' Face (VLS) ===
- "In Yo' Face"

== 2002 ==
=== DJ Cam – Liquid Hip Hop ===
- 10. "Love Junkee" (J Dilla Remix) [featuring Cameo]

=== Slum Village – Trinity (Past, Present and Future) ===
- 10. "One"
- 11. "Hoes"
- 15. "Let's"

=== Talib Kweli – Quality ===
- 12. "Where Do We Go" (featuring Res)
- 13. "Stand to the Side" (featuring Novel and Vinia Mojica)

=== Busta Rhymes – It Ain't Safe No More ===
- 2. "It Ain't Safe No More..." (featuring Meka)
- 6. "What Up"
- 7. "Turn Me Up Some"

=== Cherokee – Soul Parade ===
- 2. "Lips" (featuring Anthony Hamilton)

=== Common – Electric Circus ===
- 2. "Soul Power" _{(produced with Questlove and James Poyser)}
- 3. "Aquarius" (featuring Bilal) _{(produced with Questlove, James Poyser, and Pino Palladino)}
- 4. "Electric Wire Hustler Flower" (featuring Sonny Sandoval) _{(produced with James Poyser)}
- 7. "New Wave" (featuring Lætitia Sadier) _{(produced with Questlove and James Poyser)}
- 8. "Star *69 (PS With Love)" (featuring Bilal) _{(produced with Questlove and James Poyser)}
- 10. "Between Me, You and Liberation" (featuring Cee Lo Green) _{(produced with Questlove, James Poyser, and Pino Palladino)}
- 11. "I Am Music" (featuring Jill Scott) _{(produced with Questlove, James Poyser, Pino Palladino, and Jeff Lee Johnson)}
- 12. "Jimi Was a Rock Star" (featuring Erykah Badu) _{(produced with Questlove, James Poyser, Pino Palladino, and Jeff Lee Johnson)}
- 00. "Come Close (Closer Remix)" (featuring Pharrell, Q-Tip, and Erykah Badu) _{(produced with James Poyser)}

=== DJ Jazzy Jeff – The Magnificent EP ===
- 04. "Are U Ready?"

== 2003 ==
=== Jay Dee - Vol. 2: Vintage ===
- All tracks

=== – Ruff Draft (EP) ===
- All tracks

=== ASD – Wer Hätte Das Gedacht ===
- 18. "Komm Schon"

=== – Hey Du (Nimm Dir Zeit) (EP) ===
- A1. "Wenn Ihr Fühlt.."

=== Royce da 5'9'' – Build and Destroy: The Lost Sessions Part 1 ===
- 12. "Life Goes On"

=== Jaylib – Champion Sound ===
- 1. "L.A. to Detroit" _{(produced with Madlib)}
- 3. "Nowadayz"
- 5. "The Red"
- 7. "Raw Shit" (featuring Talib Kweli)
- 9. "The Heist"
- 11. "React" (featuring Quasimoto)
- 13. "Strip Club" (featuring Quasimoto)
- 14. "The Exclusive" (featuring Percee P)
- 16. "Starz"
- 18. "Raw Addict"
- 20. "Pillz"

=== Vivian Green – Fanatic (VLS) ===
- B1. "Fanatic (Dilla's Remix)"

=== Four Tet – As Serious (VLS) ===
- B1. "As Serious As Your Life (Remix)"

=== T-Love – Long Way Back ===
- 3. "When You're Older"
- 6. "Who Smoked Sunshine?"
- 11. "Chiquita"
- 12. "Long Way Back"

== 2004 ==
=== Proof – I Miss the Hip Hop Shop ===
- 16. "Bring It 2 Me" (featuring Killa Khann)

=== Phat Kat – The Undeniable LP ===
- 3. "Dedication 2004"
- 9. "Destiny" (featuring Melanie Rutherford)
- 11. "Big Booties"

=== Brother Jack McGruff – Obligheto (VLS) ===
- 01. "Oblighetto (Remix)

=== Slum Village – Detroit Deli (A Taste of Detroit) ===
- 2. "Do You" (featuring MC Breed)

=== Elzhi – Witness My Growth: The Mixtape '97–'04 ===
- 4. "Days and Nights"
- 18. "Concrete Eyes"
- 19. "Love It Here"
- 24. "Look at my Friends"

=== Amp Fiddler – Waltz of a Ghetto Fly ===
- 1. "Intro"
- 7. "You Play Me" _{(produced with Amp Fiddler)}
- 13. "Waltz of a Ghetto Fly" (featuring George Clinton)
- 00. "I Believe in You (Jaylib Remix)"

=== Dabrye – Two/Three ===
- 20. "Game Over" (featuring J Dilla and Phat Kat)

=== Oh No – The Disrupt ===
- 3. "Move" (featuring Roc C)

=== De La Soul – The Grind Date ===
- 2. "Verbal Clap"
- 3. "Much More" (featuring Yummy Bingham and DJ Premier)
- 13. "Shoomp" (featuring Sean Paul)

== 2005 ==
=== M.E.D. – Push Comes to Shove ===
- 5. "Push" (featuring J Dilla)
- 12. "So Real"

=== Moka Only – The Desired Effect ===
- 8. "One Time”

=== Common – Be ===
- 6. "Love Is…"
- 11. "It's Your World (Part 1 & 2)" _{(produced with James Poyser and Karriem Riggins)}

=== Dwele – Some Kinda... ===
- 11. "Keep On" (featuring Slum Village)

=== Steve Spacek – Space Shift ===
- 2. "Dollar"

=== Slum Village – Prequel to a Classic ===
- 7. "It'z Your World" (featuring J Dilla and Kurupt)
- 13. "Who Are We?"

=== Talib Kweli – Right About Now: The Official Sucka Free Mix CD ===
- 9. "Roll Off Me"

=== Lawless Element – Soundvision: In Stereo ===
- 3. "The Shining" _{(produced with Young RJ)}

=== Dwight Trible and The Life Force Trio – Love Is the Answer ===
- 14. "Aniquity"

== 2006 ==
=== J Dilla – Donuts ===
- All tracks

=== Ghostface Killah – Fishscale ===
- 7. "Beauty Jackson"
- 12. "Whip You with a Strap"

=== Busta Rhymes – The Big Bang ===
- 8. "You Can't Hold the Torch" (featuring Q-Tip and Chauncey Black)

=== A.G. – Get Dirty Radio ===
- 13. "Hip Hop Quotable" (featuring Aloe Blacc)

=== J Dilla – The Shining ===
- All tracks
  - 5. "Baby" (featuring Madlib and Guilty Simpson) [produced with Madlib]
  - 8. "Over the Breaks" _{(produced with Karriem Riggins)}
  - 9. "Body Movin'" (featuring J. Rocc and Karriem Riggins) [_{produced with Karriem Riggins and J. Rocc]}

=== The Roots – Game Theory ===
- 1. "Dillatastic Vol Won(derful)"
- 13. "Can't Stop This" _{(produced with The Roots and The Randy Watson Experience)}

=== Stones Throw Records – Chrome Children ===
- 2. "Clap Your Hands" – Guilty Simpson
- 3. "Take It Back" – Madlib {released in 2003}
- 5. "Nothing Like This" – J Dilla {released in 2003}

=== The Visionaries – We Are the Ones (We Have Been Waiting For) ===
- 3. "All Right"

== 2007 ==
=== Ghostface Killah – Hidden Darts: Special Edition ===
- 6. "Murda Goons"

=== Phat Kat – Carte Blanche ===
- 1. "Nasty Ain't It?"
- 3. "My Old Label"
- 4. Cold Steel" (featuring Elzhi)
- 9. "Game Time"

=== Common – Finding Forever ===
- 9. "So Far to Go" (featuring D'Angelo) _{{alternate version released on The Shining}}

=== J Dilla – Jay Love Japan ===
- All tracks

=== Peanut Butter Wolf – 2K8 B Ball Zombie War ===
- 3. Make it Fast – Guilty Simpson
- 4. Light Working – J Dilla featuring Q-Tip & Talib Kweli
- 8. Mash's Revenge – J Dilla featuring MF Doom & Guilty Simpson
- 11. Hydrant Game (Jaylib Remix) – Quasimoto _{(produced with Madlib)}

=== Skyzoo – Corner Store Classic ===
- 18. "They Don't Want It" (featuring Torae, Yatta Barz, and Zeqway)

=== Guilty Simpson – Stray Bullets ===
- 16. "La La"
- 23. "Man's World"

=== Busta Rhymes – Dilla-gence ===
- All tracks

=== Eric Roberson - ...Left ===
- 7. "Pretty Girl" (produced with James Poyser)

== 2008 ==
=== Guilty Simpson – Ode to the Ghetto ===
- 7. "I Must Love You"

=== Q-Tip – The Renaissance ===
- 8. "Move"
- 14. "Feva"

=== Kid Cudi – A Kid Named Cudi ===
- 4. "CuDi Get"

=== Wale – The Mixtape About Nothing ===
- 13. "The Star" (produced with Questlove and Scott Storch)

=== Akrobatik – Absolute Value ===
- 3. "Put Ya Stamp on It" (featuring Talib Kweli)

=== J Dilla, Ghostface Killah, MF Doom – Sniperlite CDS ===
- "Sniper Elite" (featuring MF Doom)
- "Murda Goons" (featuring Ghostface Killah)

=== Illa J – Yancey Boys ===
- All tracks _{(produced with Illa J and Mike Floss)}

== 2009 ==
=== Doom – Born Like This ===
- 2. "Gazzillion Ear"
- 7. "Lightworks"

=== J Dilla – Jay Stay Paid ===
- All tracks

=== Mos Def – The Ecstatic ===
- 15. "History" (featuring Talib Kweli)

=== Raekwon – Only Built 4 Cuban Linx... Pt. II ===
- 2. "House of Flying Daggers" (featuring Inspectah Deck, Ghostface Killah and Method Man)
- 14. "Ason Jones"
- 16. "10 Bricks" (featuring Cappadonna and Ghostface Killah)

=== Skyzoo – The Power of Words: The Mixtape ===
- 11. "Alphabet Soup"

== 2010 ==
=== Erykah Badu – New Amerykah Part Two (Return of the Ankh) ===
- 7. "Love" _{(produced with Erykah Badu and Mike Chav)}

=== Slum Village – Villa Manifesto ===
- 2. "Lock It Down"
- 13. "We'll Show You" (featuring AB) _{(produced with Young RJ)}

== 2011 ==
=== Fashawn – Higher Learning Vol. 2 ===
- 14. "Closer" (Remix)

== 2012 ==
=== Lil B – The Basedprint II ===
- 4. "Dress for the Occasion"

=== Joey Badass – 1999 ===
- 11. "Snakes" (featuring T'Nah Apex)
- 14. "Where It's At" (featuring Kirk Knight)

=== Smoke DZA – K.O.N.Y. ===
- 7. "G.otham F.uckin C.ity" (featuring Joey Badass)

== 2013 ==
=== Yancey Boys – Sunset Blvd. ===
- All tracks

=== Frank n Dank – 48 Hrs ===
- All tracks

=== Talib Kweli – Gravitas ===
- 11. "Colors of You" (featuring Mike Posner)

== 2015 ==
=== Joey Badass – B4.Da.$$ ===
- 7. "Like Me" (featuring BJ the Chicago Kid) _{(produced with The Roots and 1–900)}

=== MK Asante – Buck: Original Book Soundtrack ===
- 10. "My Victory" (featuring Maya Angelou)

=== Slum Village – Yes! ===
- 1. "Intro"
- 2. "Fantastic/Love Is" (featuring Bilal and Illa J)
- 3. "Tear It Down" (featuring Jon Connor)
- 4. "Bonafide" _{(produced with Young RJ)}
- 5. "Expressive" (featuring BJ the Chicago Kid, Illa J and Rosewood 2055)
- 7. "Windows" (featuring J. Ivy)
- 8. "Yes Yes (Remix)" _{(produced with Young RJ)}
- 9. "Right Back" (featuring De La Soul) _{(produced with Young RJ)}
- 11. "Too Much" (featuring Keely) _{(produced with Young RJ)}
- 12. "What We Have" (featuring Kam Corvet and Illa J)

=== Frank Nitt - Frankie Rothstein ===
- 5. "Official Supreme" (featuring Botni Applebum)

=== Esham – Dichotomy ===
- 12. "Birdz Nest"

=== Lupe Fiasco – Pharaoh Height 2/30 ===
- 3. "Of"

=== Dreamville – Revenge of the Dreamers II ===
- 8. "Still Slummin'" – Lute

== 2016 ==
=== Freeway – Fear of a Free Planet ===
- 7. "Girls"

=== J Dilla – The Diary ===
- 1. "The Introduction" _{(produced with House Shoes)}
- 2. "The Anthem" (featuring Frank n Dank)
- 6. "Trucks"
- 9. "Give Them What They Want"
- 13. "Fuck the Police"

=== Snoop Dogg – Coolaid ===
- 9. "My Carz"

== 2017 ==
=== XXXTentacion – A Ghetto Christmas Carol ===
- 2. "Hate Will Never Win”

== 2019 ==
=== Common – Let Love ===
- 2. "HER Love" (featuring Daniel Caesar)

== 2020 ==
=== Busta Rhymes – Extinction Level Event 2: The Wrath of God ===
- 3. "Strap Yourself Down" _{(produced with Pete Rock)}

== 2022 ==
=== Phife Dawg – Forever ===
- 4. "Nutshell Pt. 2" (featuring Busta Rhymes and Redman)

== 2026 ==
=== Busta Rhymes, J Dilla – Dillagence II ===
- All tracks
  - 4. "SPAZZ" _{(produced with Black Milk & Kev Brown)}
  - 6. Royalty (feauring CIE & Trilian) _{(produced with Koal The Kount Harrison)}
  - 9. Drugs (featuring C.S. Armstrong) _{(produced with Karriem Riggins)}
  - 18. What We Got In Common (featuring Common & Jon Batiste) _{(produced with Karriem Riggins)}
