= The Diary (J Dilla album) =

Studio album by J Dilla
- Released: April 15, 2016
- Recorded: September 16, 2001–April 2, 2002; The Spaceship (Clinton Township, Michigan); Studio A (Dearborn Heights, Michigan)
- Genre: Hip-hop
- Length: 36:59 (standard); 41:52 (iTunes)
- Labels: Pay Jay; Mass Appeal
- Producers: J Dilla; Madlib; Pete Rock; Bink; House Shoes; Hi-Tek; Nottz; Waajeed; Supa Dave West; Karriem Riggins

J Dilla chronology
Dillatronic (2015)	The Diary (2016)	Dillagence II (2026)

Singles from The Diary
- 1. "Fuck the Police" Released: September 18, 2001; 2. "The Anthem" Released: April 15, 2013; 3. "Diamonds" Released: August 27, 2013; 4. "Give Them What They Want" Released: May 6, 2014; 5. "The Introduction" Released: February 18, 2016; 6. "Gangsta Boogie" Released: April 2, 2016; 7. "The Sickness" Released: April 27, 2016

Professional ratings
Aggregate scores
Source	Rating
Metacritic	73/100
Review scores
Source	Rating
AllMusic	3.5/5 stars
Clash	7/10
Consequence of Sound	B
Drowned in Sound	5/10
The Guardian	4/5 stars
Mixmag	8/10
The New York Times	(favorable)
NME	4/5
Pitchfork	6.9/10
XXL	(XL)

The Diary is the sixth and final solo studio album by American hip-hop recording artist J Dilla. It was originally intended for release in 2002 via MCA Records under the title Pay Jay. This long-lost album is the final batch of unissued material that J Dilla had assembled for release during his lifetime. It also represents his first rap album released since Ruff Draft (2003) and Champion Sound (2003). Unlike previous full-length releases – from Jay Stay Paid (2009) to Dillatronic (2015) – all edited with unreleased instrumentals, The Diary is a collection of Dilla's vocal performances over his production and that of other producers, such as Madlib, Pete Rock, Nottz, Hi-Tek and Karriem Riggins among others. It also features vocal performances by Snoop Dogg, Bilal, Kokane, Frank n Dank, Nottz, Kenny Wray and Boogie (not to be confused with identically named rapper Boogie). Recording sessions for the album took place from September 16, 2001, to April 2, 2002, at The Spaceship in Clinton Township and Studio A in Detroit, and it was mastered by Dave Cooley at Elysian Masters in Los Angeles.

The Diary was released posthumously on April 15, 2016, through his label Pay Jay Productions, Inc. in conjunction with Nas' record label, Mass Appeal Records. It was supported by the singles "The Anthem", "Diamonds", "Give Them What They Want", "The Introduction", "Gangsta Boogie", and "The Sickness", and also includes the 2001 underground classic "Fuck the Police".

== Background ==
Pay Jay, as it was originally titled, is a vocal album James Dewitt "J Dilla" Yancey completed over eight months in the early 2000s, following the release of his first solo album, Welcome 2 Detroit, in 2001. Yancey was signed to a two-album solo deal with MCA Records in 2002. This album, which was to be his mainstream debut, was his attempt to take advantage of the attention he gathered after his brightest period as a behind-the-scenes hitmaker and influencer. Although he was known as a producer rather than an emcee, he chose to rap on the album and have the music produced by some of his favorite producers such as Madlib, Pete Rock, Hi-Tek, Supa Dave West, Kanye West, Nottz, Waajeed and others. However, the project stalled and the album was shelved as it was not what MCA had anticipated when it signed Yancey, leading to him being dropped and recording Ruff Draft out of frustration with the major label system. The album was kept in his storage unit in Detroit while he transitioned into living and creating in Los Angeles, before passing with lupus and an incurable blood disease in 2006. The album also suffered as select songs were leaked online and bootlegged on vinyl in April 2008.

On February 11, 2013, it was reported that the album, retitled as The Diary, would be released via Yancey's own Pay Jay Productions imprint, a company he founded in 2001 to house his production company and his publishing company, which The Estate of James Yancey has revived as a functioning imprint. The album's completion was overseen by the estate's Creative Director Eothen "Egon" Alapatt—former general manager of Stones Throw Records and A&R for Champion Sound and Donuts—who previously oversaw the remastering of Ruff Draft in 2007. In February 2016, Alapatt disclosed to Rolling Stone that The Diary was "the last record that [Yancey] actually wanted out."

The album was tentatively scheduled for release in spring 2013 and was pushed back for another year. However, no update regarding its release date was provided for two years. Pending the release of the posthumous album, eight tracks have surfaced as singles. Alapatt explained the lengthy delay: "Just unpacking the files, finding the software that [Dilla] used, getting it again, because at that point it was already archaic, unpacking the files so that we can actually look at them, took years. Literally years. Bear in mind, we were able to get some low-hanging fruit earlier than we were able to get others, that's how the Ruff Draft record with the instrumentals and unreleased tracks were able to come out. That was easy to find. It was really well labeled. The record had already come out, so we had a reference point, you know what I'm saying? It was quite simple. This record was a pain in the fucking ass."

== Release and promotion ==
On February 18, 2016, New York City rapper Nas announced on Zane Lowe's Beats 1 radio program that the much-delayed album is expected to be released on April 15, 2016, via his own label Mass Appeal in collaboration with Yancey's imprint. He also unearthed an unheard-track entitled "The Introduction". The same day, the album was made available for pre-order exclusively on iTunes where its cover art and track listing were unveiled.

A week later, it was announced that the album would be released on vinyl as a Record Store Day exclusive on April 16, 2016. The LP set contains a 16-page booklet with an introduction by Eothen Alapatt and liner notes by Ronnie Reese—who previously wrote the liner notes for J Dilla's Ruff Draft—detailing the story of the album. Along with this accouncement, the production credits were revealed.

On March 17, 2016, Nas previewed a previously unheard collaboration with J Dilla during his headlining set at Mass Appeal's Live at the BBQ showcase at SXSW in Austin, Texas. Titled "The Sickness", the Madlib-produced track is a recording that originated in 2001 and was completed in 2015 with a verse from Nas. Though the track is not included on The Diary, it came as an iTunes exclusive bonus track with pre-orders of the album for its April 15 release. Two days prior to the release, "The Sickness" was made available to stream on SoundCloud by Mass Appeal.

In anticipation of the album's release, Mass Appeal published online a series of short videos featuring some of the artists who contributed to the project, including Snoop Dogg, Bilal, Hi-Tek, Nottz, and Karriem Riggings among others.

== Singles ==
=== Fuck the Police ===
"Fuck the Police" was released on 12-inch vinyl on September 18, 2001. The track is built upon a sample of René Costy & His Orchestra's 1972 track "Scrabble", from which the drum break and violin sample are taken from. "Fuck the Police" was originally recorded for The Diary. However, it was turned down by MCA Records, who was perhaps concerned as the song was released just a week after the September 11 attacks. The label seemingly did not want to receive any ominous, unsolicited letters from the FBI. Thus, Dilla instead brought the song to California-based indie imprint Up Above Records, who would release it. Out of print for over a decade, "Fuck the Police" was remastered and reissued by Pay Jay Productions exclusively for Record Store Day 2015 (April 18). The song, using original mixes, was released on a badge-shaped 9-inch picture disc single designed by Stones Throw Records' Jeff Jank. Both the vocal and instrumental are sourced directly from mix-downs that J Dilla himself created.

=== The Anthem ===
On February 11, 2013, "The Anthem", featuring Detroit rap duo Frank n Dank, was made available to stream on Rappcats' SoundCloud. It was made purchasable at Rappcats.com on 12-inch vinyl on April 15, 2013, packaged with B-side "Trucks" – Dilla's take on Gary Numan's new wave classic, "Cars" – which was previously leaked as an unmixed, unmastered MP3. Both tracks were produced, and feature complete vocal performances, by J Dilla. According to a press release, multi-track masters of the tracks were found on 2-inch tape shortly after Dilla's death in 2006. They were finished by engineer Dave Cooley, who worked extensively with Dilla during his years in Los Angeles. While preserving all of the elements from the original demos, Cooley attempted to finalize Dilla's vision for these tracks, using the late musician's original demo mixes as his guide. The 12-inch features Dilla's original mix of "Trucks", which includes an extra verse and alternate vocals. "The Anthem", which interpolated R. Kelly's "Fiesta" on the chorus, was initially recorded on an aggressive beat composed by Kanye West, who was unaware that Dilla had used the beat which he originally made for Jay-Z. That version, entitled "We F'd Up", was revealed through the Pay Jay leak. In 2008, Kanye West disclosed, on his now defunct blog, that he had "[n]ever heard this song till now". "I made this beat in 2001, of course right after 'Takeover'," he wrote. "[W]e were [having] problems clearing the Doors sample so I made this version originally [for] Big Bro Hov." In the end however, Dilla produced the song himself as "The Anthem" which is the entire opposite of the leaked version.

=== Diamonds ===
On August 2, 2013, another track from The Diary entitled "Diamonds", was published on SoundCloud by Rappcats. It serves as the second single and was released on August 27, 2013, with B-side "Ice" in the form of a 7-track 12-inch EP called Diamonds & Ice. Recorded and mixed by Dilla between February and April 2002, the EP includes two tracks that are perhaps two of the best known pieces from the album – the first one was leaked years ago in a low quality unmastered format, and the other was released as a Jaylib-era short-lived promotional single. Long before the release of his posthumous album, The Shining (2006), J Dilla titled these two tracks "The Shining Pt. 1", and "The Shining Pt. 2". "Diamonds (The Shining Pt. 1)" was produced by Nottz, while "Ice (The Shining Pt. 2)" was produced by Madlib, who Dilla would later collaborate with under the group name Jaylib. The Diamonds & Ice EP features both final and alternate mixes of each tracks along with the instrumental and two markedly different versions of "Ice", with one showing the musical direction Dilla would embark on after The Diary was shelved in 2002. Completing this EP is a Madlib instrumental that J Dilla secured for the album but never turned into the final song, entitled "The D".

=== Give Them What They Want ===
On May 20, 2014, Pay Jay Productions released one last EP titled Give Them What They Want on a 12-inch clear vinyl. It is a five-track EP featuring three vocal tracks recorded and mixed by Dilla between September and December 2001, as well as two instrumentals. The first two vocal tracks on this record are built around the same lyrics – the title track produced by Dilla and "The Doe" produced by Supa Dave West. The last vocal track "So Far", also produced by West, is familiar to some fans of MP3 bootlegs. On this record, it is mastered for the first time by Dave Cooley. On April 16, 2014, the titular lead "Give Them What They Want" was made available to stream via Rappcats' SoundCloud page.

=== The Introduction ===
The album opener, "The Introduction", was broadcast on Zane Lowe's radio show on February 18, 2016. On the same date, the House Shoes produced-song was published on SoundCloud by Mass Appeal and was made purchasable on iTunes. A day after its release, Eric Torres of Pitchfork gave the song a "Best New Track" designation, writing that "Though it's his idiosyncratic production that earned him his legacy, Dilla was a clear force behind the mic, too."

=== Gangsta Boogie ===
Before The Diary was unearthed in full, a previously unreleased track titled "Gangsta Boogie" was premiered on Dr. Dre's Beats 1 radio show The Pharmacy on April 2, 2016. The same night, it was published on Mass Appeal's SoundCloud and was made purchasable on iTunes. Produced by Hi-Tek, the track features Kokane and Snoop Dogg, whose vocals were recorded after Dilla had passed during the making of the album. In a February 2012 interview with Complex, Stones Throw Records founder Peanut Butter Wolf first spoke about the then unfinished piece on which J Dilla gave a shout out to Snoop Dogg. He revealed that Dilla intended to have the rap veteran on the track, but the collaboration had not come to fruition before the former's death. During a brief sit-down with Mass Appeal in 2016, Snoop Dogg disclosed that he "never had a chance to work with him personally." "He was making hot music around the same time I was making hot music, and I was just hearing about him and wanted to get with him," he continued. "[W]hen he passed away I reached out to his people, and wanted them to know that I definitely wanted to work with him."

=== The Sickness ===
The last single, the bonus track "The Sickness", featuring Nas, was released on April 27, 2016. A music video for the song was released the same day. It was the album's only single with a music video.

== Track listing ==
No.	Title	Writer(s)	Producer(s)	Length
1.	"The Introduction"	J. Yancey; M. Buchanan	House Shoes; J Dilla (add.)	3:16
2.	"The Anthem" (featuring Frank n Dank)	J. Yancey; D. Harvey; F. Bush	J Dilla	2:47
3.	"Fight Club" (featuring Nottz and Boogie)	J. Yancey; R. O'Bryant; D. Lamb; G. McRae, II	Waajeed	2:24
4.	"The Shining, Pt. 1 (Diamonds)" (featuring Kenny Wray)	J. Yancey; D. Lamb; J. Seals; D. Crofts	Nottz	2:53
5.	"The Shining, Pt. 2 (Ice)"	J. Yancey; O. Jackson, Jr.	Madlib	1:09
6.	"Trucks"	J. Yancey; G. Webb	J Dilla	3:41
7.	"Gangsta Boogie" (featuring Snoop Dogg and Kokane)	J. Yancey; T. Cottrel; J. Long; C. Broadus	Hi-Tek	3:18
8.	"Drive Me Wild"	J. Yancey; K. Riggins	Karriem Riggins	2:23
9.	"Give Them What They Want"	J. Yancey	J Dilla	2:28
10.	"The Creep (The O)"	J. Yancey; T. Cottrel	Hi-Tek	2:50
11.	"The Ex" (featuring Bilal)	J. Yancey; P. Phillips; B. Oliver	Pete Rock	3:32
12.	"So Far"	J. Yancey; D. West	Supa Dave West	2:17
13.	"Fuck the Police"	J. Yancey; R. Costy; A. Decock	J Dilla	2:34
14.	"The Diary"	J. Yancey; R. Harrell	Bink!	1:27
Total length:				36:59

iTunes / Japan bonus tracks
No.	Title	Producer(s)	Length
15.	"The Sickness" (featuring Nas)	Madlib	2:38
16.	"The Doe"	Supa Dave West	2:15
Total length:			41:52

The Diary: Limited Edition Bonus 45 LP
No.	Title	Producer(s)	Length
1.	"The Ex (Album Version)" (featuring Bilal)	Pete Rock	3:32
2.	"The Ex (R&B Version)" (featuring Bilal)	Pete Rock	3:32
Total length:			44:03

Sample credits

- "The Shining Pt. 1 (Diamonds)" contains a sample of "Diamond Girl" performed by Seals and Crofts.
- "Trucks" is an interpolation of "Cars" performed by Gary Numan.
- "Fuck the Police" contains a sample of "Scrabble" performed by René Costy & His Orchestra.
- "So Far" contains a sample of "Nobody's Home" performed by Kansas (band).

== Charts ==
Chart (2016)	Peak position
Belgian Albums (Ultratop Flanders)	133
UK Albums (OCC)	111
US Billboard 200	77
US Independent Albums (Billboard)	7
US Top R&B/Hip-Hop Albums (Billboard)	6
US Top Rap Albums (Billboard)	5
US Indie Store Album Sales (Billboard)	3
