= Donut Shop =

EP by J Dilla
- Released: June 11, 2010
- Genre: Hip hop, instrumental hip hop
- Label: Stones Throw Records; Serato; Pay Jay Productions
- Producer: J Dilla

J Dilla chronology
Jay Stay Paid (2009)	Donut Shop (2010)	Dillatroit (2012)

Donut Shop is a 2-disc collection of previously unreleased instrumental hip hop songs by J Dilla, former founding member of Slum Village. The collection was posthumously released in 2010 by joint venture of Stones Throw, the J Dilla Estate, and Serato.

== Background ==
The collection is made of three previously unreleased instrumentals personally selected by J Rocc from Dilla's archives, which are “Safety Dance”, “Sycamore”, and “Bars & Twists”. The other three unreleased instrumentals are versions of Dilla's productions for Mos Def, Q-Tip and Busta Rhymes. The collection was remastered by Elysian Masters, who mixed and mastered Donuts, The Shining, and Ruff Draft albums. Also included are Serato Scratch Live DJ software and two donut slipmats.

== Track listing ==
1. Safety Dance
2. Sycamore
3. Bars & Twists
4. History (Mos Def)
5. Move (Q-Tip)
6. You Can't Hold A Torch (Busta Rhymes)

== Samples ==
- "Safety Dance"
- "Sycamore"
  - "King of the Beats" by Mantronix
  - "Do Ya Thang" by B.R. Gunna
- "Bars & Twists"
