= Donuts EP: J. Rocc's Picks =

2006 J. Dilla memorial EP

EP by J Dilla
- Released: March 13, 2006
- Recorded: 2005–2006
- Genre: Hip hop
- Label: Stones Throw
- Producer: J Dilla

J Dilla chronology
Donuts (2006)	Donuts EP: J. Rocc's Picks (2006)	The Shining (2006)

Donuts EP: J. Rocc's Picks is an EP released by Stones Throw following the 2006 death of Detroit producer/rapper J Dilla. The follow-up to his Donuts album, this EP features tracks picked by J. Rocc, a fellow producer on Stones Throw. The tracks on the EP are extended versions of the original tracks from Donuts, with the exception of "Signs", which is not included on the original album.

== Track listing ==
All tracks written by J. Yancey.

=== Side A ===
No.	Title	Samples	Length
1.	""Lightworks""	"Bendix 1: 'The Tomorrow People'" & "Lightworks" by Raymond Scott	2:31
2.	""Two Can Win""	"Only One Can Win" by The Sylvers	2:55
3.	""Signs""	"Gimme Little Sign" by Brenton Wood & "Different Strokes" by Syl Johnson	2:34

=== Side B ===
No.	Title	Samples	Length
1.	""People!""	"People Hold On" by Eddie Kendricks & "Here We Go (Live at the Fun House)" by Run-D.M.C.	2:06
2.	""Light It Again""	"Light My Fire" by Africa	2:50
3.	""High""	"Maybe" by The Three Degrees	2:39
