= Dilla Time =

Book by Dan Charnas

- Author: Dan Charnas
- Cover artist: Rodrigo Corral
- Language: English
- Genre: Biography
- Publisher: MCD
- Publication date: February 1, 2022
- Publication place: United States
- Pages: 480 pp.
- ISBN: 978-0374139940

Dilla Time: The Life and Afterlife of J Dilla, the Hip-Hop Producer Who Reinvented Rhythm is a 2022 biography of hip hop producer J Dilla written by Dan Charnas. It chronicles the life of J Dilla until his death in 2006, as well as his posthumous influence on the music industry. Described as "equal parts biography, musicology, and cultural history," the book emphasizes J Dilla's signature rhythmic time-feel, which Charnas termed "Dilla time," and its wide-reaching impact on modern music.

The book debuted on The New York Times Best Sellers list, receiving widespread acclaim from critics and musicians.

== Background ==
In 1999, writer Dan Charnas met J Dilla and Common while the two musicians were working on Common's album Like Water for Chocolate at J Dilla's home studio in Conant Gardens, Detroit. Charnas cites this meeting as "the real origin of the book".

As an associate professor at the Clive Davis Institute of Recorded Music at New York University, Charnas taught a course called "Topics in Recorded Music: J Dilla" that discussed J Dilla's musical techniques and influence. He began work researching and reporting for the book in 2017. Charnas interviewed over 200 friends, family members, and collaborators of J Dilla throughout the research process.

In the book, Charnas aims to dispel several myths about J Dilla. For one, according to Charnas, many musicians reduce J Dilla's time-feel as simply "loose" and "not quantizing", but the book describes this as an oversimplification, detailing the nuances that defined J Dilla's technique. The book also debunks the misconception that J Dilla produced his 2006 album Donuts in the hospital, instead explaining that the album was born from an earlier beat tape and edited by Jeff Jank of Stones Throw Records while J Dilla was in the hospital.

== Cover artwork ==
Dilla Time's cover artwork was designed by Rodrigo Corral. The New York Times listed it as one of the best book covers of 2022, calling it "an image that signals the zones of [J Dilla's] many talents while nodding to the relationship between that talent and work ethic (and beats)," also noting the exclusion of Charnas' name from the cover.

== Reception ==
Dilla Time was released to widespread critical acclaim, debuting at number four on The New York Times Hardcover Nonfiction Best Sellers list.

Pitchfork called Dilla Time "easily the best rap book of the year," describing the book as "not only a love letter to Dilla, but also a riveting immersion into the music of Detroit and the art of beatmaking." Rolling Stone listed the book as one of the best music books of 2022, describing it as "elegantly written and deeply sourced." Writing for Spin, Liza Lentini praised the book, calling it "a portrait of a complex genius taken too young, as well as a glorious study of the music and culture he created."

At the 2023 PEN Awards, Dilla Time won the PEN/Jacqueline Bograd Weld Award for Biography.

== Film adaptation ==
On September 22, 2022, it was announced that Questlove would executive produce a feature documentary titled Dilla Time, adapted from the book. The film will be co-directed by Joseph Patel, who produced Summer of Soul with Questlove, and Darby Wheeler. The film will be produced in cooperation with J Dilla's estate, with Dan Charnas also serving as producer. The film has been described as "part biography, part musicology, and part musical meditation, featuring insight from some of the most influential and innovative voices of modern music."
