= J Dilla =

American record producer and rapper (1974–2006)

- J Dilla in 1996

Background information
- Also known as: Jay Dee; Jon Doe; JD; Dilla; Dilla Dawg; McNasty; J Deezy; Dill Withers; MC Silk; Pay Jay
- Born: James Dewitt Yancey; February 7, 1974; Detroit, Michigan, U.S.
- Died: February 10, 2006 (aged 32) Los Angeles, California, U.S.
- Genres: Midwestern hip-hop; West Coast hip-hop; instrumental hip-hop; progressive soul; electronic; jazz
- Occupations: Record producer; rapper; composer; drummer; songwriter
- Instruments: Vocals; drums; percussion; keyboards; drum machine; sampler
- Works: Albums; production
- Years active: 1993–2006
- Labels: Delicious Vinyl; BBE; PayJay Productions, Inc.; MCA; Stones Throw; Bling 47; ✓Look
- Formerly of: Champion Sound; Slum Village; Soulquarians; The Ummah

James Dewitt Yancey (February 7, 1974 – February 10, 2006), better known by the stage names J Dilla, Jay Dee, or simply Dilla, was an American record producer, rapper, and composer. He emerged from the mid-1990s underground hip-hop scene in Detroit, Michigan, as a member of the group Slum Village. He was a founding member of the Soulquarians, a musical collective active during the late 1990s and early 2000s. Yancey and Madlib collaborated as the duo Jaylib, releasing the album Champion Sound. Yancey's final album, Donuts, was released three days before his death. He was also known for producing the Pharcyde album Labcabincalifornia.

Yancey died at the age of 32 from a combination of TTP and lupus. Despite a short mainstream career, he is widely considered to be one of the most influential producers in hip-hop and popular music. J Dilla's music raised the artistic level of hip-hop production in Detroit. According to The Guardian, "His affinity for crafting lengthy, melodic loops peppered with breakbeats and vocal samples took instrumental hip-hop into new, more musically complex realms." Yancey's approach to drum programming, often cited as a loose or "drunk" style that eschews the use of quantization, has been influential on producers and drummers.

== Early life ==
Yancey grew up in Detroit, Michigan. The family lived in a house on the northeast corner of McDougall and Nevada, on the east side of Detroit. Yancey's parents had musical backgrounds; his mother, Maureen "Ma Dukes" Yancey, is a former opera singer and his father, Beverly Dewitt Yancey, was a jazz bassist, and performed Globetrotters half-time shows for several years. Yancey's mother said that he could "match pitch perfect harmony" before he learned how to speak.

Along with a range of other musical genres, Yancey developed a passion for hip-hop music. After transferring from Davis Aerospace Technical High School to Pershing High School, his classmates T3 and Baatin joined him in rap battles; the three later formed the rap group Slum Village. Yancey also took up beat-making using a simple tape deck as the center of his studio. In his teenage years, he "stayed in the basement alone" to train himself to produce beats with his growing record collection.

== Career ==
=== 1992–2000: Early career ===
In 1992, Yancey met the Detroit musician Amp Fiddler, who let him use his Akai MPC, a music workstation, which he quickly mastered. Fiddler, while playing keyboards with Funkadelic on the 1994 Lollapalooza tour, met Q-Tip of A Tribe Called Quest, a group also in the lineup. Fiddler introduced Q-Tip to Yancey, who gave Q-Tip a Slum Village demo tape. In 1995, Yancey and MC Phat Kat formed 1st Down and became the first Detroit hip-hop group to sign with a major label (Payday Records). The deal ended after one single when the label ended the contract.

In 1995, Yancey recorded the Yester Years EP with 5 Elementz (a group consisting of Proof, Thyme, and Mudd). In 1996, he formed Slum Village and recorded what would become their debut album Fantastic, Vol. 1 at RJ Rice Studios. Upon its release in 1997, the album quickly became popular with fans of Detroit hip-hop. Many journalists compared Slum Village to A Tribe Called Quest. However, Yancey said he felt uncomfortable with the comparison:

It was kinda fucked up [getting that stamp] because people automatically put us in that [Tribe] category. That was actually a category that we didn't actually wanna be in. I thought the music came off like that, but we didn't realize that shit then. I mean, you gotta listen to the lyrics of the shit. Niggas was talking about getting head from bitches. It was like a nigga from Native Tongues never woulda said that shit. I don't know how to say it. It's kinda fucked up because the audience we were trying to give to were actually people we hung around. Me, myself, I hung around regular ass Detroit cats. Not the backpack shit that people kept putting out there like that. I mean, I ain't never carried no goddamn backpack. But like I said, I understand to a certain extent. I guess that's how the beats came off on some smooth type of shit. And at that time, that's when Ruff Ryders [was out] and there was a lot of hard shit on the radio so our thing was we're gonna do exactly what's not on the radio.

By the mid-1990s Yancey had a string of singles and remix projects for artists such as Janet Jackson, the Pharcyde, De La Soul, Busta Rhymes, A Tribe Called Quest as well as Q-Tip solo, and others. Many of these productions were released without Yancey's name attribution, being credited to the Ummah, a production collective composed of him, Q-Tip and Ali Shaheed Muhammad of A Tribe Called Quest, and later Raphael Saadiq of Tony! Toni! Toné!. However, he was given songwriting credit on all of his non-remix productions under the Ummah.

Under this umbrella, Yancey produced original songs and remixes for Janet Jackson, Busta Rhymes, Brand New Heavies, Something For the People, trip hop artists Crustation and many others. He handled production on seven tracks from the Pharcyde's album Labcabincalifornia, released in the holiday season of 1995 and Hello, the debut album by Poe, released earlier that year on Modern Records.

=== 2000–2006: Performing career ===
2000 marked the major label debut of Slum Village with Fantastic, Vol. 2, creating a new following for Yancey as a producer and MC. He was also a founding member of the production collective known as the Soulquarians (along with Ahmir "Questlove" Thompson, D'Angelo and James Poyser amongst others) which earned him more recognition. He later worked with Erykah Badu, Poe, Talib Kweli, and Common—contributing heavily to the latter's critically acclaimed breakthrough album, Like Water for Chocolate.

His debut as a solo artist came in 2001 with the single "Fuck the Police" (Up Above Records), followed by the album Welcome 2 Detroit, which began British independent record label BBE's "Beat Generation" series. In 2001, Yancey began using the name J Dilla to differentiate himself from Jermaine Dupri who also goes by "J.D." He left Slum Village to pursue a major label solo career with MCA Records.

In 2002, Yancey produced Frank-N-Dank's 48 Hours, as well as a solo album, but neither record was ever released, although the former surfaced through bootlegging. When Yancey finished working with Frank-N-Dank on the 48 Hours album, MCA Records requested a record with a larger commercial appeal, and the artists re-recorded the majority of the tracks, this time using little to no samples. Despite this, neither versions of the album were successful, and Yancey stated that he was disappointed that the music never got out to the fans.

Around this time, Yancey also assisted in the production of singer and fellow Soulquarian Bilal's second album, Love for Sale. The singer credited Yancey with showing him a unique approach to drum programming: "He had this thing where no matter what he picked up he could bend his will into it. Just because you hear it so strong in your head you can throw the funk in it."

Yancey was signed to a solo deal with MCA Records in 2002. Although Yancey was known as a producer rather than an MC, he chose to rap on the album and have the music produced by some of his favorite producers, such as Madlib, Pete Rock, Hi-Tek, Supa Dave West, Kanye West, Nottz, Waajeed and others. The album was shelved due to internal changes at the label and MCA.

While the record with MCA stalled, Yancey recorded Ruff Draft, released exclusively to vinyl by German label Groove Attack. The album was also unsuccessful, but his work from this point on was increasingly released through independent record labels. In a 2003 interview with Groove Attack, Yancey talked about this change of direction:

You know, if I had a choice... Skip the major labels and just put it out yourself, man... Trust me. I tell everybody it's better to do it yourself and let the Indies come after you instead of going in their [direction] and getting a deal and you have to wait. It ain't fun. Take it from me. Right now, I'm on MCA but it feels like I'm an unsigned artist still. It's cool. It's a blessing, but damn I'm like, 'When's my shit gonna come out? I'm ready now, what's up?'

== Later life and death ==
The Los Angeles producer and MC Madlib began collaborating with Yancey, and the pair formed the group Jaylib in 2002, releasing an album called Champion Sound in 2003. Yancey relocated from Detroit to Los Angeles in 2004 and appeared on tour with Jaylib in Spring 2004.

Yancey's illness and medication caused dramatic weight loss in 2003 onwards, forcing him to publicly confirm speculation about his health in 2004. Despite a slower output of major releases and production credits in 2004 and 2005, his cult status remained strong within his core audience, as evidenced by unauthorized circulation of his underground "beat tapes" (instrumental, and raw working materials), mostly through internet file sharing.

Articles in the publications URB (March 2004) and XXL (June 2005) confirmed rumors of ill health and hospitalization during this period, but these were downplayed by Jay himself. The seriousness of his condition became public in November 2005 when Yancey toured Europe performing from a wheelchair. It was later revealed that he suffered from thrombotic thrombocytopenic purpura (a rare blood disease), and lupus. Near the end of his life, he was mostly hospital bound, which eventually left him in debt–after his medical insurance was dropped following a late payment. His mother, Maureen Yancey, recalled paying $500,000 a month.

Yancey died on February 10, 2006, at his home in Los Angeles, three days after the release of his final album, Donuts. Maureen said that the cause was cardiac arrest. He is buried at Forest Lawn in Glendale, California.

== Musical style ==
According to Dan Charnas, Yancey juxtaposed straight and swung styles, creating "a new, pleasurable, disorienting rhythmic friction and new time-feel". He used an Akai MPC3000 and disabled the quantize feature to create his signature "off-kilter" sampling style.

His style was later mimicked by live drum player Questlove, who shaped the drum groove of neo soul.

== Posthumous releases ==
At the time of his death, Yancey had several projects planned for future completion and release. According to founding Slum Village member T3 in an interview in March 2015, Yancey had about 150 unreleased beats, some of which featured on Slum Village's album entitled Yes!, released June 16, 2015.

The Shining was "75% completed when Dilla died" and was finished by Karriem Riggins and later released on August 8, 2006, on BBE Records.

Ruff Draft was reissued as a double CD/LP set in March 2007 and is sometimes considered his third solo album. The reissue contains unreleased material from the Ruff Draft sessions and instrumentals. It was also released in a cassette tape format, paying homage to Yancey's dirty, grimy sound (he was known for recording over two-tracked instrumentals).

Sniperlite was an EP released by the hip-hop collaboration Dilla Ghost Doom, consisting of Yancey, Ghostface Killah, and MF Doom. It was recorded sometime in 2005 before Yancey's passing. It was subsequently released in 2008 by Stones Throw Records.

Jay Love Japan was announced in 2005 as his debut release on the Operation Unknown label. Though it saw a 2006 release in Japan, it was heavily bootlegged elsewhere and did not receive an official release until 2016.

Champion Sound, Yancey's and Madlib's collaborative album, was reissued in June 2007 by Stones Throw Records as a 2-CD Deluxe Edition with instrumentals and b-sides.

Yancey Boys, the debut album by Yancey's younger brother John Yancey, was released in 2008 on Delicious Vinyl Records. It is produced entirely by Dilla and features rapping by his brother, under the name 'Illa J'. Stones Throw Records released a digital instrumental version of the album in 2009.

Jay Stay Paid, an album featuring 28 previously unreleased instrumental tracks made at various points in his career, was released in 2009 by Nature Sounds. Vocals to a select few of the tracks were provided by rappers who were close to Yancey though the majority of the album is instrumental. The project was mixed and arranged by Pete Rock.

In 2010, unreleased production and vocals from Yancey were featured on Slum Village's sixth studio album Villa Manifesto, the first album with all five members.

In December 2011, Jonathan Taylor, CEO of the Yancey Music Group (founded by Yancey's mother Maureen Yancey), told the UK's Conspiracy Worldwide radio show that the album Rebirth of Detroit was ready for a May 2012 release. On May 25, 2012, Mahogani Music released a limited edition 12" vinyl titled Dillatroit/Rebirth Promo EP, leading up to the official release of Rebirth of Detroit on June 12, 2012.

In 2014, Yancey's long-lost MCA Records album entitled The Diary was scheduled for release, but was delayed to April 15, 2016, via Mass Appeal Records. Intended for release in 2002, the album is a collection of Yancey's vocal performances over production by Madlib, Pete Rock, Nottz, House Shoes, Karriem Riggins, and others. The first single is the album's intro cut, "The Introduction."

In 2020, Dres of Black Sheep announced that he would be releasing a collaborative album with Yancey titled No Words, with unreleased instrumentals of Yancey's provided with the cooperation of his mother.

In February 2021, the 20th anniversary edition of Welcome 2 Detroit was released.

In March 2023, the J Dilla Foundation partnered with Kano Computing for a 10-year deal to release exclusive music on the Stem Player. They released J Dilla’s Stems Vol. 1 with the deal's announcement, followed by volumes 2 and 3 later.

In 2020, Busta Rhymes who collaborated on the 2007 mixtape Dillagence, revealed that J Dilla had provided him with roughly 300 beats that he considered to be "extremely selective with". Some of these appear on Dillagence 2, released in 2026. The album contains posthumous vocals from D'Angelo and guest appearances from Talib Kweli, Common, Ludacris, Big Sean, Anderson .Paak, Watch the Duck, Slum Village member T3, Lil Wayne, Jon BatisteLa Reezy, Honey Bxby and C.S. Armstrong. Two singles along with music videos were released, Spazzz and Talk Ya Shit (with Lil Wayne)).

== Legacy ==
Yancey was survived by two daughters. In May 2006, Yancey's mother announced the creation of the J Dilla Foundation, which works to cure people affected by lupus.

=== Influence and innovation ===
"Don't Cry"
"Don't Cry", a noteworthy track from Donuts, achieved universal critical acclaim

Yancey's death has had a significant impact on the hip-hop community. Besides countless tribute tracks and concerts, Yancey's death created a wealth of interest in his remaining catalog and, consequently, Yancey's influence on hip-hop production became more apparent.

"Highly influential for both producers and drummers", he made "innovative" use of the MPC sampler, by employing real-time rhythms and choosing not to quantize them, thus creating a "drunk" and "laid-back" style which "[was] a significant contribution to contemporary popular music that evade[d] quick interpretation, transcription and definition". Questlove—who considers Yancey the "world's greatest drummer"—said that he "invented the sound we call neo-soul" and actively sought to emulate Yancey. The University of Illinois' Adam Kruse states that Yancey is "considered one of the greatest beat producers in hip-hop's history".

=== Honors ===
Dave Chappelle gives a special dedication to Yancey in his movie Dave Chappelle's Block Party, which includes the statement: "This film is dedicated to the life and memory of Music Producer J Dilla, aka Jay Dee (James D. Yancey)". The film focuses mostly on members of the Soulquarians, a collective of hip-hop musicians of which Yancey was also a member.

Yancey's music has been used in various television programs. In 2006, Cartoon Network's late night programing block Adult Swim played the songs "Waves", "Welcome to the Show", and "Mash" during the commercial bumpers in between shows, as well as a number of tracks on their Chrome Children EP. In May 2010, UK mobile network O2 used Jaylib's "The Red" instrumental in their "Pool Party" ad. A recent BBC documentary inspired by the Olympic runner Usain Bolt contained two Yancey-produced songs—"So Far To Go" by Common and "Runnin'" by the Pharcyde.

In February 2007, a year after his death, Yancey posthumously received the PLUG Awards Artist of the Year as well as the award for Record Producer of the Year. In Yancey's hometown of Detroit, Detroit techno veteran Carl Craig has fronted a movement to install a plaque in honor of Yancey in Conant Gardens (where the artist grew up and initiated his career). A resolution for the proposed plaque was passed by the Detroit Entertainment Commission in May 2010, and is currently awaiting approval by the Detroit City Council.

=== Posthumous controversies ===
Despite these accolades, there have been documented conflicts between his mother and the executor of his estate Arthur Erk regarding future Dilla releases. In an interview with LA Weekly, Erk described how difficult it was for the estate to "protect his legacy" due to bootlegging and unofficial mixtapes. He stressed how important it was for the estate to gather all possible income related to Yancey's name, as Yancey had to borrow money from the government due to mounting medical bills at the end of his life.

A few weeks later, Yancey's mother, who appeared on such unofficial mixtapes as Busta Rhymes' Dillagence, gave her take on these issues. In addition to stating that Arthur Erk and Yancey's estate has chosen not to communicate with his family, she has said that he has barred anyone from use of Yancey's likeness or name.

One of the things Dilla wanted me to do with his legacy was to use it to help others, people with illness, kids who were musically gifted but had little hope due to poverty. I wanted to use my contacts to help people out and it was squashed because we weren't in compliance with the state and there was nothing we could do about it. I'm Dilla's mother and I can't use Dilla's name or likeness, but I know that I still can honor him by doing his work.

Mrs. Yancey mentioned that Erk was in fact Yancey's accountant and not his business manager in his lifetime, and that he fell into his position because she and Yancey were first and foremost concerned about his health and not with getting paperwork in order. She also said that Yancey's friends in the hip-hop community, such as Erykah Badu, Busta Rhymes, Madlib, Common, and the Roots, have contacted her personally for future projects with Yancey beats, but the estate has vetoed all future projects not contracted prior to Yancey's death. She implied that Yancey would not support the estate's practices, such as their prosecution of bootleggers and file sharers.

Due to Yancey's debt it took 15 plus years for his heirs to profit from his work. As of 2021, payment has been received. Yancey's children are being supported by the social security their mothers have drawn. Likewise, Mrs. Yancey is also still paying off Yancey's medical bills that she helped finance, leaving her also in tremendous debt. She still lives in the same Detroit ghetto, is still a daycare worker at Conant Gardens and also suffers from lupus, the same disease which killed Yancey. To help pay the cost of medication and keep her household afloat, Delicious Vinyl donated all proceeds of Jay Dee – The Delicious Vinyl Years to Mrs. Yancey in 2007. In 2008, Giant Peach created a donation PayPal account for her and RenSoul.com released a charity mixtape.

According to his mother, the family lost their old home in Detroit due to her taking care of Yancey in his final days. The mother of one of Yancey's children, Monica Whitlow, broke her silence on the issue of the estate and his legacy:

It pisses me off, everything that's going on with this estate. It's ridiculous 'cause it's been three years, and my baby has not seen anything from this estate.

On January 24, 2010, an announcement was made on j-dilla.com, regarding the Yancey Estate and the Yancey family.

The family of late music producer James "J Dilla" Yancey is extremely pleased to announce the appointment of West Coast probate attorney Alex Borden as an administrator of Yancey's estate, and also to announce the establishment of the official J Dilla Foundation. The developments mark a new chapter in preserving and enhancing the legacy of the legendary artist and secure a means of future prosperity for his mother, Maureen "Ma Dukes" Yancey, daughters Ja'Mya Yancey and Ty-Monae Whitlow, and brother, John "Illa J" Yancey.

=== Memorial items ===
In mid-2012, Montpellier, France, dedicated a small street "Allée Jay Dee".

In 2014, Maureen Yancey donated Yancey's custom-made Minimoog Voyager synthesizer and Akai MPC3000 to the Smithsonian's National Museum of African American History and Culture. They are part of the "Musical Crossroads" exhibit.

A Yancey-inspired donut shop opened in Detroit on May 3, 2016, to a great reception. Created by Yancey's uncle Herman Hayes to honor his nephew's legacy, it sold out of donuts three times on its first day.

=== Book ===
The book Dilla Time by Dan Charnas about Yancey's life, work and influence premiered at #4 on the New York Times bestseller list in February 2022.

== Discography ==
=== Studio albums ===
- 2001: Welcome 2 Detroit
- 2003: Champion Sound (with Madlib as Jaylib)
- 2006: Donuts

=== Posthumously released studio albums ===
- 2006: The Shining
- 2007: Jay Love Japan
- 2009: Jay Stay Paid
- 2016: The Diary
- 2026: Dillagence II (with Busta Rhymes)

=== Extended plays ===
- 2002: Vol. 1: Unreleased
- 2003: Vol. 2: Vintage
- 2003: Ruff Draft (2003 release)

=== Compilations ===
- 2007: Jay Deelicious: The Delicious Vinyl Years
- 2009: Dillanthology 1: Dilla's Productions for Various Artists
- 2009: Dillanthology 2: Dilla's Remixes for Various Artists
- 2009: Dillanthology 3: Dilla's Productions
- 2013: Lost Tapes, Reels + More
- 2015: Jay Dee a.k.a. J Dilla 'The King of Beats' (Box Set)
- 2015: Dillatronic
- 2016: Jay Dee a.k.a. J Dilla 'The King of Beats', Vol. 2: Lost Scrolls
- 2016: Jay Dee's Ma Dukes Collection
- 2017: J Dilla's Delights, Vol. 1
- 2017: J Dilla's Delights, Vol. 2

=== Posthumously released work ===
- 2006: Donuts EP: J. Rocc's Picks (EP)
- 2006: The Shining
- 2007: Ruff Draft (Reissue)
- 2007: Jay Love Japan
- 2008: Sniperlite (with MF Doom and Ghostface Killah as Dilla Ghost Doom)
- 2009: Jay Stay Paid
- 2010: Donut Shop (EP)
- 2012: Dillatroit (EP)
- 2012: Rebirth of Detroit
- 2013: The Lost Scrolls, Vol. 1 (EP)
- 2013: Diamonds & Ice (EP)
- 2014: Give Them What They Want (EP)
- 2016: The Diary
- 2016: Back to the Crib (Mixtape)
- 2017: Motor City
