= Quantization (music) =

Rhythm correction process

In digital music processing technology, quantization is the studio-software process of transforming performed musical notes, which may be imprecise, to a strict rhythm. The process results in notes being set on beats and exact fractions of beats.

The purpose of quantization in music processing is to provide a more beat-accurate timing of sounds. Quantization is frequently applied to a record of MIDI notes created by the use of a musical keyboard or drum machine. Additionally, the phrase "pitch quantization" can refer to pitch correction used in audio production, such as using Auto-Tune.

== Description ==
A frequent application of musical quantization lies within MIDI application software or hardware. MIDI sequencers typically include quantization in their manifest of edit commands. In this case, the dimensions of this timing grid are set beforehand. When one instructs the music application to quantize a certain group of MIDI notes in a song, the program moves each note to the closest point on the timing grid. MIDI notes can be quantized by Note On and/or Note Off; some digital audio workstations (DAW) shift the entire note by moving both messages together. Sometimes, quantization is applied in terms of a percentage to partially align the notes to a certain beat. Using a percentage of quantization allows for the subtle preservation of some natural human timing nuances.

A question in quantization is determining which rhythmic fluctuations are imprecise, and should be removed by the quantization process, and which are expressive, to be retained and represented in the output score. For instance, a simple children's song like "Twinkle Twinkle, Little Star" might have coarse quantization: there is a low number of notes and they occur on a rigid beat. On the other hand, quantizing a complex piano piece by Arnold Schoenberg would best be accomplished with a fine-grain quantization: there are many notes and their timing and placement in the composition was the product of intentional artistry.

In recent years, audio quantization has become more commonplace in DAWs, used to tighten the playing of organic instruments or to refine the triggering of recorded soundbites.

== Non-quantization ==
Hip-hop producer J Dilla used an Akai MPC3000 and disabled the quantize feature to create his signature "off-kilter" sampling style. His style was later mimicked by live drum player Questlove, who shaped the drum groove of neo soul. Other musicians to use non-quantized drums include Madlib and Moka Only.

== See also ==
- Note value
- Time signature
