= Vol. 1: Unreleased =

The Official Jay Dee Instrumental Series Vol. 1: Unreleased

EP by Jay Dee
- Released: October 1, 2002
- Genre: Instrumental hip-hop
- Length: 22:00
- Label: Bling 47
- Producer: Jay Dee

Jay Dee chronology
Welcome 2 Detroit (2001)	The Official Jay Dee Instrumental Series Vol. 1: Unreleased (2002)	Vol. 2: Vintage (2003)

The Official Jay Dee Instrumental Series Vol.1: Unreleased is a 2002 EP by American hip-hop producer Jay Dee (also known as J Dilla). The EP was compiled by Jay Dee and Waajeed, and is a collection of previously unreleased beats. Vol. 1 is distributed by Bling 47 and is mainly available through their website. This release was followed by Vol.2: Vintage, three months later.

== Track listing ==
1. "Flyyyyy"
  - contains a sample of "A Very Smelly, Grubby Little Oik" by Caravan
2. "Busta"
3. "L.L."
4. "Hambro"
5. "Substitute"
6. "Guitar"
7. "Tomita"
  - contains a sample of "Aranjuez" by Isao Tomita
8. "Vibe Out"
