= Jay Love Japan =

Studio album by J Dilla
- Released: 2006 (Japan); June 26, 2007 (America)
- Genre: Hip-hop
- Length: 19:10 (2007); 21:53 (2016)
- Labels: Operation Unknown; Pay Jay
- Producer: J Dilla

J Dilla chronology
Ruff Draft (Reissue) (2007)	Jay Love Japan (2007)	Jay Deelicious: The Delicious Vinyl Years (2007)

Professional ratings
Review scores
Source	Rating
AllMusic	2.5/5 stars
RapReviews	8.5/10

Jay Love Japan is the fourth studio album and second posthumous project by American hip-hop recording artist, J Dilla. The album was released on June 26, 2007. The album was re-issued in 2016 after being out of print for many years.

== History ==
Promo and semi-official retail versions of the album have circulated for several years, and the album was even given a 2006 release in Japan, although that version is now considered a promo item. It was announced in an issue of the magazine Wax Poetics in 2005 and given various missed release dates in 2006, 2007, and 2008, with a track list containing two songs with other artists' vocals added after Dilla's death. Bill Sharp, an upper level employee of major hip-hop retailer Fat Beats and the webmaster of fatbeats.com, had this to say on the matter:

"We had many thousands of units of Jay Loves Japan [sic] sitting in our warehouse while legalities were worked out with Dilla's estate for nearly one year. There are boots out there, there are imports. The one Fat Beats sells is not a bootleg."

The album, however, was released onto the iTunes Store on June 26, 2007 under PayJay Productions, Inc. The album was distributed to retail by the California-based Operation Unknown label in 2008. It is now out of print.

J Dilla began and possibly completed this album before his death in February 2006. The album was intended as an instrumental EP featuring two guest vocal tracks, whereas the label itself first described it as featuring Raekwon, Blu, Ta'Raach, Truth Hurts, and more, tentatively including Slum Village. The album was distributed by Fat Beats Distribution based in New York. The album has an accompanying video series for the track "Can't You See." An EPK was released as far back as 2005. Most recent photographs used of J Dilla, such as the inside cover of J Dilla's BBE album The Shining, as well as recent MTV pictures, were Operation Unknown photo sessions for Jay Love Japan.

== Deluxe edition ==
In 2016, the project was finally properly made available on CD and 12" LP through the work of the Dilla Estate. Released via Vintage Vibez Music Group, a label created for the release of the limited edition J Dilla collection Dillatronic, the album was remastered and correctly sequenced with songs missing from the earlier 2007 version. Stretched out to 11 tracks the project clocks in at 25 minutes with early pressings of the vinyl version featuring a bonus 7" single containing two additional tracks.

== Track listing ==
=== 2007 version ===
1. "JLJ Intro" - 0:11
2. "Yesterday" - 1:11
3. "Say It" (feat. Ta'Raach & Exile) - 2:54
4. "Oh Oh" - 3:08
5. "First Time" (feat. Baatin & The Ruckazoid) - 2:55
6. "In the Streets" - 3:06
7. "Believe in God" - 2:02
8. "Can't You See" - 2:06
9. "Say It" (Instrumental) - 2:24

=== 2016 version ===
1. "Can't You See" - 2:06
2. "Sun in My Face" (feat. Blu & Jontel) - 3:14
3. "In the Streets" - 3:07
4. "Oh Oh" - 3:09
5. "Say It" (feat. Ta'Raach & Exile) - 2:55
6. "Lucy" (feat. Bo Bo Lamb) - 2:36
7. "First Time" (feat. Baatin & The Ruckazoid) - 2:56
8. "Red Light" (feat. J*Davey) - 2:16
9. "Outro" - 0:11
10. "Yesterday" - 1:11
11. "Believe in God" - 2:03
- A track called "Feel the Beat" appears in the track listing on the back cover of the 2007 version, in between "Believe in God" and "Can't You See", but is not on the CD. This instrumental track has however appeared on several J Dilla beat tapes shared over the internet.

== Samples ==
- "Jay Love Japan Intro"
  - "The Fairy Garden" by Isao Tomita
- "Yesterday"
  - "Yesterday" by Gladys Knight & the Pips
- "Say It"
  - "Nothing Seems Impossible" by The Emotions
- "First Time"
  - "Moments In Love" by Art of Noise
- "Believe in God"
  - "You Are Just A Living Doll" by JJ Barnes
- "Can't You See"
  - "Can't You See It's Me" by Diana Ross & The Supremes
- "Sun In My Face feat. Blu & Jontel"
  - "All The Befores" by Diana Ross
  - "(I Know) I'm Losing You" by The Undisputed Truth
