= Dillatronic =

Compilation album by J Dilla
- Released: October 30, 2015
- Genre: Instrumental hip hop
- Length: 69:45
- Label: Vintage Vibez
- Producer: J Dilla

J Dilla chronology
Jay Stay Paid (2009)	Dillatronic (2015)	The Diary (2016)

Professional ratings
Review scores
Source	Rating
AllMusic	4/5 stars
HipHopDX	3.0/5
Now	4/5 stars
Pitchfork	7.0/10
PopMatters	7/10 stars

Dillatronic is a compilation album by hip hop musician J Dilla, released posthumously on October 30, 2015, through Vintage Vibez Music Group. This album is a collection of 41 unreleased instrumentals, put together by Dilla's mother Ma Dukes and Vintage Vibez. Dillatronic was made available as a 3×LP set, on CD, and in a variety of deluxe edition packages with T-shirts, bags, cassettes, posters, and other collectables.

== Track listing ==
All tracks are produced by J Dilla.

No.	Title	Length
1.	"Dillatronic 01"	3:06
2.	"Dillatronic 02"	2:23
3.	"Dillatronic 03"	1:04
4.	"Dillatronic 04"	2:04
5.	"Dillatronic 05"	1:03
6.	"Dillatronic 06"	1:10
7.	"Dillatronic 07"	2:23
8.	"Dillatronic 08"	2:13
9.	"Dillatronic 09"	2:35
10.	"Dillatronic 10"	1:36
11.	"Dillatronic 11"	2:22
12.	"Dillatronic 12"	0:40
13.	"Dillatronic 13"	2:16
14.	"Dillatronic 14"	1:33
15.	"Dillatronic 15"	2:44
16.	"Dillatronic 16"	2:28
17.	"Dillatronic 17"	2:09
18.	"Dillatronic 18"	0:52
19.	"Dillatronic 19"	2:47
20.	"Dillatronic 20"	2:39
21.	"Dillatronic 21"	0:46
22.	"Dillatronic 22"	2:31
23.	"Dillatronic 23"	0:59
24.	"Dillatronic 24"	0:45
25.	"Dillatronic 25"	0:41
26.	"Dillatronic 26"	1:45
27.	"Dillatronic 27"	0:47
28.	"Dillatronic 28"	1:09
29.	"Dillatronic 29"	1:58
30.	"Dillatronic 30"	0:57
31.	"Dillatronic 31"	1:14
32.	"Dillatronic 32"	1:38
33.	"Dillatronic 33"	2:01
34.	"Dillatronic 34"	1:26
35.	"Dillatronic 35"	1:48
36.	"Dillatronic 36"	2:42
37.	"Dillatronic 37"	1:25
38.	"Dillatronic 38"	0:28
39.	"Dillatronic 39"	1:03
40.	"Dillatronic 40"	0:19
41.	"Dillatronic 41"	3:15
