= Vol. 2: Vintage =

EP by Jay Dee
- Released: January 1, 2003
- Genre: Hip-hop
- Length: 39:01
- Label: Bling 47
- Producer: Jay Dee

Jay Dee chronology
Vol. 1: Unreleased (2002)	Vol. 2: Vintage (2003)	Ruff Draft (2003)

Vol. 2: Vintage (a.k.a. The Official Jay Dee Instrumental Series Vol. 2: Vintage) is an instrumental EP by producer Jay Dee (also known as J Dilla). The EP features unreleased tracks compiled from the period 1995–1998. These beats may represent his simpler work, before he entered his more experimental phase, but still contain his trademark heavy filtering, syncopated basslines, and lo-fi sonics.

== Track listing ==
1. "It's Dope"
2. "Kamaal"
3. "Doo Doo"
4. "The Skip"
5. "Get Down"
6. "Dreamy"
7. "Coastin'"
8. "The Dee"
9. "Earl"
10. "On the 1"
11. "Circus"
12. "Grannie"
13. "Trashy"
