= Ruff Draft =

Studio album / EP by Jay Dee
- Released: February 25, 2003 (Original); March 20, 2007 (Re-issue)
- Genres: Hip-hop; hardcore hip-hop; experimental hip-hop
- Length: 18:16 (Original EP); 53:46 (Stones Throw Re-release)
- Labels: Mummy; Stones Throw
- Producer: Jay Dee

Jay Dee chronology
Vol. 2: Vintage (2003)	Ruff Draft (2003)	Champion Sound (2003)

Reissue album jacket
- The front cover of the Stones Throw re-release

Jay Dee chronology
The Shining (2006)	Ruff Draft (Reissue) (2007)	Jay Love Japan (2007)

Professional ratings
Aggregate scores
Source	Rating
Metacritic	81/100
Review scores
Source	Rating
AllMusic	4/5 stars
The A.V. Club	A−
HipHopDX	4/5
MusicOMH	3/5 stars
Pitchfork	6.8/10
RapReviews	8/10
The Skinny	4/5 stars
Slant Magazine	3.5/5 stars
Uncut	4/5 stars
URB	4.5/5 stars

Ruff Draft is an EP reissued as a studio album by American hip hop producer and rapper J Dilla released under the moniker "Jay Dee". It was originally released in February 2003 as an EP, by his then-newly founded label, Mummy Records, and distributed by Groove Attack, a German record label. In 2007, Ruff Draft was extended, remastered, and posthumously re-released as a "solo album" by Stones Throw Records. The re-release sold 8,049 copies in its first week, J Dilla's largest first-week sales as a solo artist.

== Overview ==
The original vinyl release of Ruff Draft is now out-of-print. Although the album is one of Jay Dee's lesser known works, it includes some of his most abstract and experimental work, all self-produced, and recorded in under a week. As stated in the introduction of the album, it is a noncommercial sounding lo-fi hip-hop album, which sees the producer playfully toying with different styles, such as on "Nothing Like This," where his vocals are distorted and skewered over an equally eccentric production featuring a sample played backwards. The result mirrors the more off-center moments on Common's Electric Circus, which Dilla also worked on. In regards to the project's name and creation, Dilla has stated:

″That was a quickie. I did it in four or five days, turned it in and had wax in ten days. If I'm not doing beats for somebody, I make stuff for me to drive around and listen to, and that was one of those projects. I was just doing me. That's why it was called the 'Ruff Draft' EP.″

Stones Throw Records re-issued the album on CD and vinyl on March 20, 2007. The re-release is remastered from the original master tapes, with sound engineers taking steps to maintain the original release's integrity, along with additional songs, as well as an instrumental CD.

== Notes ==
- Ruff Draft was released after Yancey began using the name J Dilla but the cover still lists 'Jay Dee'.
- It is also the first release to bear the name 'Jaylib' (in the liner notes); J Dilla and Madlib's group which would not debut until a few months after the release of Ruff Draft.
- Jaylib's "Ice" contains lyrics heard in the final seconds of the Ruff Draft track "Make'em NV".
- J Dilla went on a short promotional tour in 2003, performing DJ sets with Dank of Frank-N-Dank following the release of Ruff Draft:
  - Jan. 15th — Helsinki FIN at Kerma Club
  - Jan. 17th — Eindhoven, NL at Effenaar
  - Jan. 18th — Bienne, SWI at La Coupole
  - Jan. 19th — Paris, FR at Divan du Monde
  - Jan. 24th — Gothenburg, SWD
  - Jan. 25th — Malmo, SWD at Inkonst Quality
  - Jan. 26th — Stockholm, SWD at Mosebacke Est.

== Track listing ==
Original 2003 EP Release
No.	Title	Length
1.	"Intro"	0:17
2.	"Let's Take It Back"	2:10
3.	"Reckless Driving"	2:41
4.	"Nothing Like This"	2:33
5.	"The $"	2:43
6.	"Interlude"	0:49
7.	"Make'em NV"	2:25
8.	"Interlude"	0:45
9.	"Crushin' (Yeeeeaah!)"	3:43
10.	"Shouts"	0:51
Total length:		18:57

2007 Reissue - Disc 1
No.	Title	Length
1.	"Intro"	0:17
2.	"Let's Take It Back"	2:10
3.	"Reckless Driving"	2:41
4.	"Nothing Like This"	2:33
5.	"The $"	2:43
6.	"Interlude"	0:49
7.	"Make'em NV"	2:25
8.	"Interlude"	0:45
9.	"Crushin' (Yeeeeaah!)"	3:43
10.	"Shouts"	0:51
11.	"Intro (Alt.)"	0:48
12.	"Wild"	2:19
13.	"Take Notice" (Feat. Guilty Simpson)	4:25
14.	"Shouts (Alt.)"	1:47
Total length:		28:16

2007 Reissue - Disc 2
No.	Title	Length
1.	"Let's Take It Back (Instrumental)"	2:06
2.	"Reckless Driving (Instrumental)"	2:41
3.	"Nothing Like This (Instrumental)"	2:33
4.	"The $ (Instrumental)"	2:45
5.	"Make'em NV (Instrumental)"	2:24
6.	"Crushin' (Instrumental)"	3:41
7.	"Intro (Alt. Instrumental)"	0:46
8.	"Wild (Instrumental)"	2:21
9.	"Take Notice (Instrumental)"	4:26
10.	"Shouts (Alt. Instrumental)"	1:47
Total length:		25:30

== Samples Used ==
- "Lets Take It Back" contains interpolated lyrics from "Verses From the Abstract" by A Tribe Called Quest and samples of "Pause" by Jay Dee (featuring Frank-N-Dank)
- "Reckless Driving" contains interpolated lyrics from "What?" by A Tribe Called Quest and samples of "Pause" by Jay Dee
- "The $" contains interpolated lyrics from "Paid In Full" by Eric B & Rakim and samples of "Dooinit" by Common, "Pause" by Jay Dee and "Escape (I Need A Break)" by Whodini
- "Make 'Em NV" contains samples of "La Rotta" by John Renbourn and "Ante Up" by M.O.P.
- "Crushin'" contains samples of "Sweet Stuff" by Sylvia Robinson
- "Intro (Alt.)" contains samples of "Hold You Close" by P'taah
- "Wild" contains samples of "Cum On Feel the Noize" by Neil Innes & Son
- "Take Notice" contains samples of "Soul Love" by David Bowie and "Phase By Phase" by Peter Baumann
