= Champion Sound =

2003 studio album by Jaylib

Studio album by Jaylib
- Released: October 7, 2003
- Recorded: 2001–2003
- Genre: Hip-hop
- Length: 52:08
- Label: Stones Throw
- Producers: J Dilla; Madlib

J Dilla chronology
Ruff Draft (2003)	Champion Sound (2003)	Donuts (2006)

Madlib chronology
Shades of Blue (2003)	Champion Sound (2003)	Madvillainy (2004)

Singles from Champion Sound
- 1. "The Red / The Official" Released: June 16, 2003; 2. "McNasty Filth / Pillz" Released: June 6, 2004

Champion Sound is a collaborative album by the duo Jaylib, consisting of producers J Dilla and Madlib. It was released on October 7, 2003; and features guest appearances from Madlib's alter ego (Quasimoto), Frank N Dank, Talib Kweli, Guilty Simpson and Percee P. The album would eventually be reissued in 2007 with bonus tracks.

Despite being a collaborative album, Madlib and Dilla were working on Champion Sound in their respective hometowns (Oxnard, California and Detroit, Michigan, United States), and would send instrumentals to each other so they can add verses over them. Like Madlib's subsequent release, Madvillainy, the early version of Champion Sound and its unreleased tracks would get leaked online before the album's release. The album would receive critical acclaim, despite being commercially unsuccessful.

== Background ==
Before the artists met, Stones Throw Records founder Peanut Butter Wolf and Dilla had met via a local Detroit DJ and record store owner by the name of House Shoes. Wolf had also came across a 12-inch single of Madlib's group Lootpack, and eventually secured a distribution deal with the group. Additionally, while Dilla was at a production session of D'Angelo's sophomore album Voodoo, he had shown Lootpack's sole studio album Soundpieces: Da Antidote! to D'Angelo and drummer Ahmid "Questlove" Thompson.

The duo initially met after one of Madlib's friends J Rocc of the hip-hop group the Beat Junkies, showed Madlib a few of Dilla's "beat tapes". Eventually, Madlib had started sending Dilla his beats. They had already worked on the beats at their respective hometowns. Madlib recounts in an interview that he had sent one of his beats to Dilla, but Dilla declined since another rapper had reserved the beat, and instead sent hundreds of beats to Madlib in concession. J Dilla had also heard a mix that Madlib put together in his Bomb Shelter studio of him rapping over Dilla's beats entitled Jaylib. Dilla was impressed enough to call up Peanut Butter Wolf for a collaboration.

In 2005, Madlib's compilation of unreleased Jaylib tracks got leaked as an early version of Madvillain's Madvillainy did before. These two CDs were compiled by Madlib in late 2002 to listen to on a trip to Brazil. The Jaylib compilation was called The Rough Drafts and the Madvillain compilation was called Madvillainy Preview.

== Releases ==
The first pressings of the album in the USA contained two bonus tracks: "Raw Addict," and "Ice" (which otherwise are only on a white label 12" issued by Stones Throw); the first pressing of the CD in Europe included those two and a third track, "Pillz," which was later featured as the b-side to the single for "McNasty Filth".

The 2007 re-issue of Champion Sound was abruptly delayed when Stones Throw was issued a cease-and-desist from the camp of artist Cris Williamson. "The Red", one of the more popular songs from the LP, contained an unauthorized sample of her song "Shine On, Straight Arrow". According to J-Rocc of the Beat Junkies, the sample clearance issue came down to Williamson's gripe about a Madlib lyric:

"There's a Jaylib track called ‘The Red’ they got sued for. Cris Williamson is the artist and she’s a total feminist, a real woman-power type. In that song Madlib says "mostly shitty women". She said, 'I’m not having that, take it off the album.' But she’s still letting them use the instrumental for licensing and so on. So even there they’ve worked something out".

— J Rocc

"The Red" appears on the reissue with an alternate beat, though one still arranged by J Dilla. An alternate beat was also used for the song "No Games" on the re-issue, due to the beat being recycled for the more popular MF Doom song "One Beer", which appeared on his 2004 critically acclaimed album Mm..Food. During a rare 2004 Power 106 interview, J Dilla and Madlib discuss a possible Jaylib sequel, although after J Dilla's death in 2006, nothing has been released or announced since, and it's unconfirmed whether or not the album ever went into production.

== Critical reception ==
Professional ratings
Review scores
Source	Rating
AllMusic	4.5/5 stars
The A.V. Club	mixed
Cleveland Scene	favorable
Exclaim!	favorable
HipHopDX	4/5 stars
Pitchfork	7.4/10
Stylus Magazine	A

Champion Sound would receive critical acclaim upon release. AllMusic writer Sam Samuelson gave the album a positive review, in which he praised the production and Madlib's rapping, but was more mixed on Dilla's lyrical prowess. Samuelson eventually concludes that "While it may require repeated listens to take hold, Champion Sound is full of a lot more winners than losers." Exclaim! Magazine writer Noel Dix gave the deluxe edition of the album a very positive review, writing "Champion Sound went over many heads when it first came out but looking back, it's apparent that Dilla and Madlib were on some next level that slow pokes just needed time to catch up to. Essential for anyone that gives a damn about real hip-hop". Pitchfork writer Nick Sylvester gave a relatively positive review, in which he enjoyed the production, but was mixed on the album's "lyrical shortcomings". Furthermore, he also preferred Madlib's side of the record more than Dilla's. Stylus Magazine writer Nate De Young gave a similar review, while despite praising the duo's rapping ability, he wrote that most of the lyrics are about "weed, hoe's, and ice", but praised the production.

=== Accolades ===
In 2010, Champion Sound was listed by Black Milk as one of the "Top Ten Albums of the Last Decade". In 2015, it ranked at number 41 on Fact's "100 Best Indie Hip-Hop Records of All Time" list. In that year, it was also listed by HipHopDX as one of the "30 Best Underground Hip Hop Albums Since 2000".

== Track listing ==
Champion Sound track listing
No.	Title	Producer(s)	Length
1.	"L.A. to Detroit"	Jaylib	1:19
2.	"McNasty Filth" (featuring Frank-N-Dank)	Madlib	2:55
3.	"Nowadayz"	J Dilla	3:08
4.	"Champion Sound"	Madlib	2:23
5.	"The Red"	J Dilla	3:14
6.	"Heavy"	Madlib	3:46
7.	"Raw Shit" (featuring Talib Kweli)	J Dilla	3:08
8.	"The Official"	Madlib	3:31
9.	"The Heist"	J Dilla	3:05
10.	"The Mission"	Madlib	2:24
11.	"React" (featuring Quasimoto)	J Dilla	2:45
12.	"Strapped" (featuring Guilty Simpson)	Madlib	3:13
13.	"Strip Club" (featuring Quasimoto)	J Dilla	2:50
14.	"The Exclusive" (featuring Percee P)	J Dilla	1:23
15.	"Survival Test"	Madlib	3:55
16.	"Starz"	J Dilla	3:03
17.	"No Games"	Madlib	1:47
18.	"Raw Addict"	J Dilla	3:02
19.	"Ice"	Madlib	1:17
20.	"Pillz"	J Dilla	3:05

Deluxe edition: Disc 1
No.	Title	Producer(s)	Length
1.	"L.A. to Detroit"	Jaylib
2.	"McNasty Filth"	Madlib
3.	"Nowadayz"	J Dilla
4.	"Champion Sound"	Madlib
5.	"The Red (Remix)"	J Dilla	3:22
6.	"Heavy"	Madlib
7.	"Raw Shit"	J Dilla
8.	"The Official"	Madlib
9.	"The Heist"	J Dilla
10.	"The Mission"	Madlib
11.	"React"	J Dilla
12.	"Strapped"	Madlib
13.	"Strip Club"	J Dilla
14.	"The Exclusive"	J Dilla
15.	"Survival Test"	Madlib
16.	"Starz"	J Dilla
17.	"No Games (Remix)"	Madlib	2:32
18.	"Raw Addict"	J Dilla
19.	"Pillz"	J Dilla

Deluxe edition: Disc 2
No.	Title	Producer(s)	Length
1.	"Da Rawkus (Sir Bang Version)"	Jaylib
2.	"The Official (Rap Circle Mix)"	Madlib
3.	"Heavy (Chronic Mix)"	Madlib
4.	"Optimos for Dilla (Interlude)"	Jaylib
5.	"Survival Test (Rasta Dub Remix)"	Madlib
6.	"Champion Sound (Remix)"	Madlib
7.	"The Mission (Stringed Out Mix)"	Madlib
8.	"One for Dilla (Interlude)"	Jaylib
9.	"Strapped (Four-4 Mix)"	Madlib
10.	"McNasty Filth (Instrumental)"	Madlib
11.	"Nowadayz (Instrumental)"	J Dilla
12.	"Champion Sound (Instrumental)"	Madlib
13.	"The Red (Instrumental)"	J Dilla
14.	"Heavy (Instrumental)"	Madlib
15.	"Raw Shit (Instrumental)"	J Dilla
16.	"The Official (Instrumental)"	Madlib
17.	"The Heist (Instrumental)"	J Dilla
18.	"The Mission (Instrumental)"	Madlib
19.	"React (Instrumental)"	J Dilla
20.	"Strapped (Instrumental)"	Madlib
21.	"Strip Club (Instrumental)"	J Dilla
22.	"The Exclusive (Instrumental)"	J Dilla
23.	"Survival Test (Instrumental)"	Madlib
24.	"Starz (Instrumental)"	J Dilla
