= Jay Stay Paid =

Studio album by J Dilla
- Released: June 2, 2009
- Recorded: 2003–2006 (J Dilla's vocals)
- Genre: Hip-hop; instrumental hip-hop
- Length: 57:54
- Label: Nature Sounds
- Producer: J Dilla; Ma Dukes (exec.)

J Dilla chronology
Jay Deelicious: The Delicious Vinyl Years (2007)	Jay Stay Paid (2009)	Dillatronic (2015)

Singles from Jay Stay Paid
- 1. "Reality Check" Released: May 12, 2009

Professional ratings
Aggregate scores
Source	Rating
Metacritic	81/100
Review scores
Source	Rating
AllMusic	4/5 stars
The A.V. Club	A−
MSN Music (Consumer Guide)	B+
Los Angeles Times	4/4 stars
Pitchfork	8.1/10
PopMatters	6/10
RapReviews	8.5/10
Rolling Stone	3/5 stars
URB	4.5/5 stars
XXL	4/5

Jay Stay Paid is the fifth studio album by American hip-hop producer and rapper J Dilla. It was released as a posthumous album on June 2, 2009, by Nature Sounds. Despite the fact that the album has contributing vocals from several artists, it is roughly classified as an instrumental hip-hop album.

== Background ==
The album is a 28-track collection of unreleased Dilla beats mixed and arranged by Pete Rock. Although Jay Stay Paid is mostly instrumental, it includes guests vocals from several artists that Dilla worked with or admired, such as Black Thought, Havoc, Raekwon, MF Doom, and M.O.P. It was executive produced by Dilla's mother Maureen "Ma Dukes" Yancey along with the musical supervision of Dilla's musical idol, Pete Rock. In regard to the album's feel and direction Ma Dukes stated:

It wasn't rushed and it wasn't haphazard. This album combines what he did in the beginning of his career, what he did in some of our early hospital stays, which was very deep, and some stuff pulled from old floppy disks & DATs. It's mind blowing... this is like the missing links to Dilla's legacy.

Art Direction and illustrations for Jay Stay Paid were contributed by graphic artist Mike Orduna (Fatoe) for Fatoe.com.

In promotion for the album, the Beat Junkies released a free sampler of the album.

The format of the album plays like a radio show with Pete Rock as the program director. With regards to Pete's involvement, Ms. Yancey has stated, "Dilla wanted to pattern himself behind Pete. His dream was to become as close as possible to what Pete stood for. Pete meant everything to him. Dilla would have just been flabbergasted!" Pete has reciprocated Dilla's admiration, stating, "Dude was amazing. He just kinda came outta nowhere and the more you heard his beats the better they got. He may not be here with us, but it's all good; we're going to keep his music alive and well."

The album debuted at the No. 96 on the Billboard charts with a total of 5,400 copies sold in its first week.

In July 2009, video director Derek Pike shot a video for the single "24k Rap" featuring Havoc and Raekwon.

== Track listing ==
#	Title	Featuring	Time	Sample(s)
1	KJay FM Dedication	Pete Rock	0:56	*"King of the Beats" by Mantronix, "Theme from Hurricane David" by R. Stevie Moore
2	King		1:28	*"A Treatise on Cosmic Fire: Intro - Prana" by Todd Rundgren
3	I Told Yall		2:49	*"Basketball Throwdown" by The Cold Crush Brothers, "Multiply" by Xzibit
4	Lazer Gunne Funke		1:21	*"King of the Beats" by Mantronix
5	In The Night (Owl N Out) / While You Slept (I Crept)		2:00	
6	Smoke	Blu	2:09	*"King of the Beats" by Mantronix and *"The Fairy Garden" by Isao Tomita
7	Blood Sport	Lil' Fame	2:58	
8	CaDILLAc		2:01	
9	Expensive Whip		1:25	
10	Kaklow (Jump On It)		0:56	*"1984 (Part 1)" by Anthony Phillips
11	Digi Dirt	Phat Kat	0:54	
12	Dilla Bot Vs. The Hybrid	Danny Brown & Constantine	2:24	
13	Milk Money		1:27	*"Snow Creatures" by Quincy Jones "Make the Move" (Caddyshack soundtrack) by Kenny Loggins
14	Spacecowboy Vs. Bobble Head		2:38	*"Let the Sunshine In" by Mort Garson and "Speed Reading" by Stevens & Grdnic
15	Reality Check	Black Thought	2:40	*"Bup Ba Bup Bup Ba Ba Ba" by J Dilla; Also known as "Reality TV"
16	On Stilts		1:26	*"Talybont" by Gentle Giant
17	Fire Wood Drumstix	MF Doom	1:31	*"Hey Hey Hey Heyyyy" by J Dilla
18	Glamour Sho75 (09)		3:02	"Come Give Your Love To Me" by Janet Jackson
19	10,000 Watts		1:42	*"Thief's Theme"* by Nas
20	9th Caller		1:53	*"Oh No I Don't Believe It" by Fraternity of Man
21	Make It Fast (Unadulterated Mix)	Diz Gibran	5:01	*"Rock N Roll" by J Dilla
22	24K Rap	Havoc & Raekwon	4:22	*"(Don't Want No) Woman" by Lee Michaels
23	Big City		1:02	
24	Pay Day	Frank Nitty of Frank n Dank	1:25	
25	See That Boy Fly	Illa J & Cue D	3:44	*"Flyyyyy" by J Dilla
26	Coming Back		1:13	*"The Affair" by Brother to Brother (1974)
27	Mythsysizer		1:44	
28	KJay & We Out	Pete Rock	1:58	*"The Wisdom of Time" by The Supremes
29	Make It Fast (Vinyl Bonus Track)	Bun B & Termanology	2:48	
