= Donuts (album) =

- Original artwork

Studio album by J Dilla
- Released: February 7, 2006
- Recorded: 2005
- Studio: Disputed: either Cedars-Sinai Medical Center or J Dilla's home
- Genres: Instrumental hip-hop; alternative hip-hop; plunderphonics
- Length: 43:24
- Label: Stones Throw
- Producer: J Dilla

J Dilla chronology
Champion Sound (2003)	Donuts (2006)	The Shining (2006)

Alternative cover
- Original vinyl edition cover, referencing Randy's Donuts in Los Angeles

Donuts is the second studio album by the American hip-hop producer J Dilla, as well as the final album to be released in his lifetime. It was released on February 7, 2006, by Stones Throw Records, on his 32nd birthday, just three days before his death. Produced in 2005, it is an instrumental hip-hop album structured in an infinite loop, consisting of 31 tracks with 34 different samples from rock, jazz, and soul.

Dilla's health began to decline following a tour in early 2002. He was diagnosed with thrombotic thrombocytopenic purpura (TTP) and lupus; he spent the following years in and out of hospitals, including a stay at the Cedars-Sinai Medical Center in 2005. He continued producing music in his free time. Conflicting accounts exist regarding the recording of Donuts; one states Dilla produced the album at the Cedars-Sinai Medical Center, while another, presented by writer Dan Charnas, states it originated as a homemade demo tape that was later finalized by Stones Throw art director Jeff Jank.

Donuts received widespread critical acclaim for its dense, eclectic sampling and its perceived confrontation of mortality. Pitchfork placed the album at number 38 on their list of the top 50 albums of 2006, and at number 66 on their list of the top 200 albums of the 2000s. In 2020, Rolling Stone ranked the album at 386 in their 500 Greatest Albums of All Time. It is regarded by fans and critics alike as J Dilla's magnum opus, a classic of instrumental hip-hop, and one of the most influential hip-hop albums of all time, with artists of many genres citing it as an inspiration.

== Background ==
Following the release of two albums with Slum Village, J Dilla left the group to focus on his solo career. In 2001, he released Welcome 2 Detroit. Shortly after, he got signed by MCA. However, the label shelved his second solo album. During that period, he also started working with Madlib, with the duo releasing Champion Sound in 2003 through Stones Throw. In the process, he befriended people running the label and continued working with them, releasing Donuts through the label.

J Dilla's health started declining after a tour in January 2002, when he had been diagnosed with thrombotic thrombocytopenic purpura (TTP), a rare and incurable blood disease. (Note: In the years following J Dilla's death, doctors studied his case and now assume he had atypical hemolytic uremic syndrome, a much rarer progressive disease, but one that had an effective drug treatment developed for it.) He spent the next years in and out of hospitals. In 2004, after an invitation from his friend and collaborator, rapper Common, J Dilla moved from his hometown of Detroit to Los Angeles. A few months later, when his condition worsened, he asked his mother to move to Los Angeles to help him. After he was diagnosed with lupus, he spent most of 2005 in Cedars-Sinai Medical Center, continuing to create music in his free time.

== Production ==
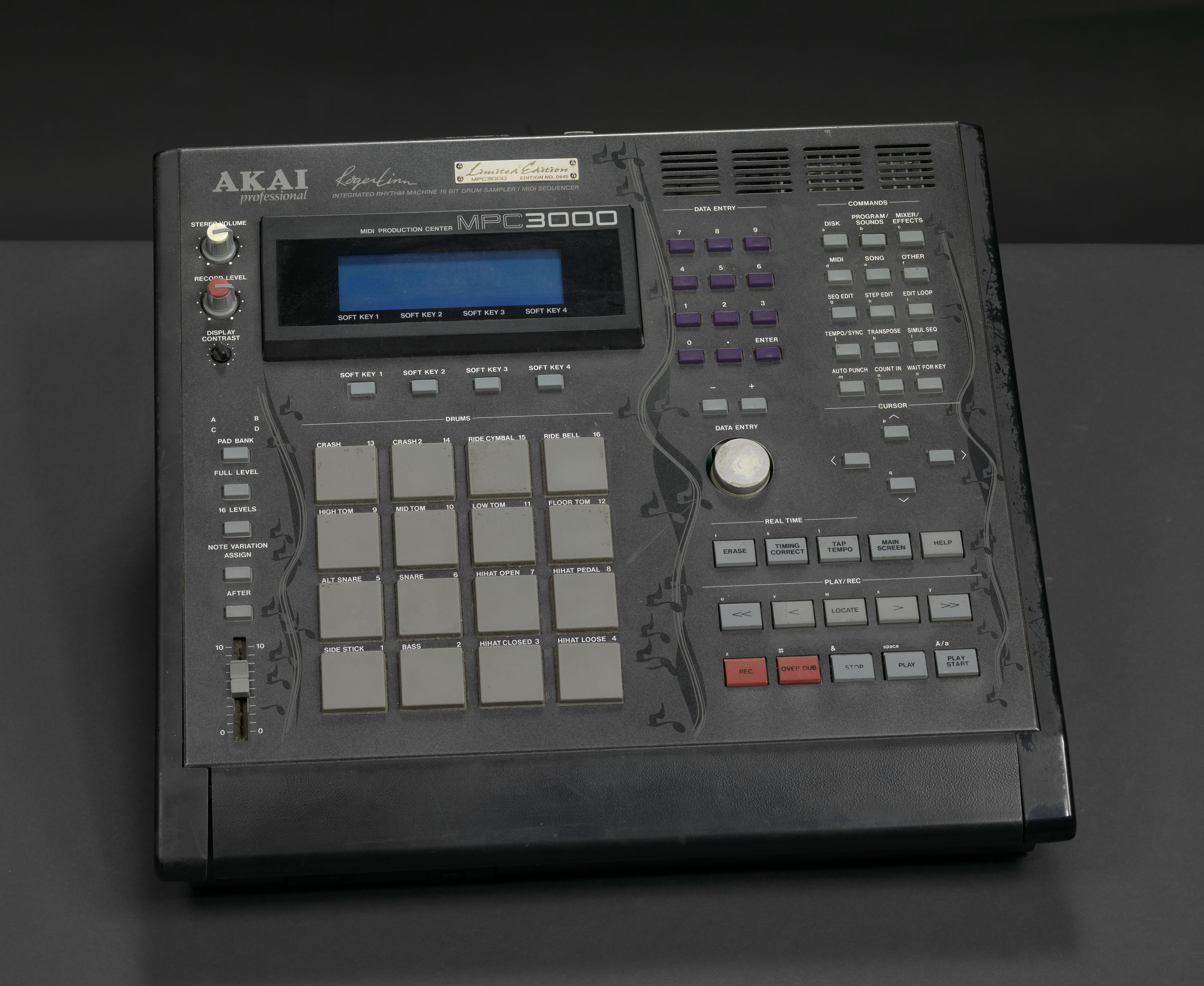
Dilla's Akai MPC: it was donated to the National Museum of African American History and Culture in 2014.

Hints of Donuts emerged as early as 2001, during J Dilla's interview with DJ and record label owner Gilles Peterson, while promoting his debut solo album, Welcome 2 Detroit (2001). When asked about the direction of the album, J Dilla emphasized that listeners should expect something completely new.

Two different accounts exist regarding the recording of Donuts; according to the popular version, J Dilla worked on the album at the Cedars-Sinai Medical Center. (Note: Sources following the first account conflict on its exact details.) According to this narrative, most (or a small part) of Donuts was recorded at the hospital, using a portable turntable and Boss SP-303 sampler. Throughout the years, J Dilla shared his latest work with friends and colleagues using short demo records, called "beat tapes". He played one of them, titled Donuts, to Madlib and Peanut Butter Wolf, the founder of Stones Throw, who then shared it with other members of the label. All of them loved it, but Eothen "Egon" Alapatt, Stones Throw's general manager, did not want to release it, since he thought J Dilla should instead work on a sequel to Champion Sound. Peanut Butter Wolf convinced him that they should release an instrumental album, as J Dilla was unable to record vocals due to his deteriorating condition. They brought vinyl records, portable turntables and samplers to the hospital, allowing J Dilla to work on the album. Concerns over compensation began to arise as Stones Throw was a small company at the time. The label agreed on a deal where it was going to own Donuts as an asset while allowing J Dilla to sell his beats from the album to other artists.

According to Egon, "almost all of [the album]" was created before J Dilla was hospitalized, but he continued working on the album during hospital stays. The Source magazine claimed 29 out of 31 tracks were "completed" in the hospital. At times, when J Dilla's hands swelled up, causing pain, his mother massaged them, allowing him to continue working on the album. His mother, Maureen Yancey, had requested J Dilla's MPC, Moog keyboard, a turntable, a laptop, an audio interface, and a crate of records to his hotel room. According to Kelley L. Carter of Detroit Free Press, J Dilla told his doctor he was proud of the work, and that all he wanted to do was finish the album. While working on the album, J Dilla forbade anyone to listen to the unfinished version, and was furious when he found out his mother listened to it while he was in dialysis.

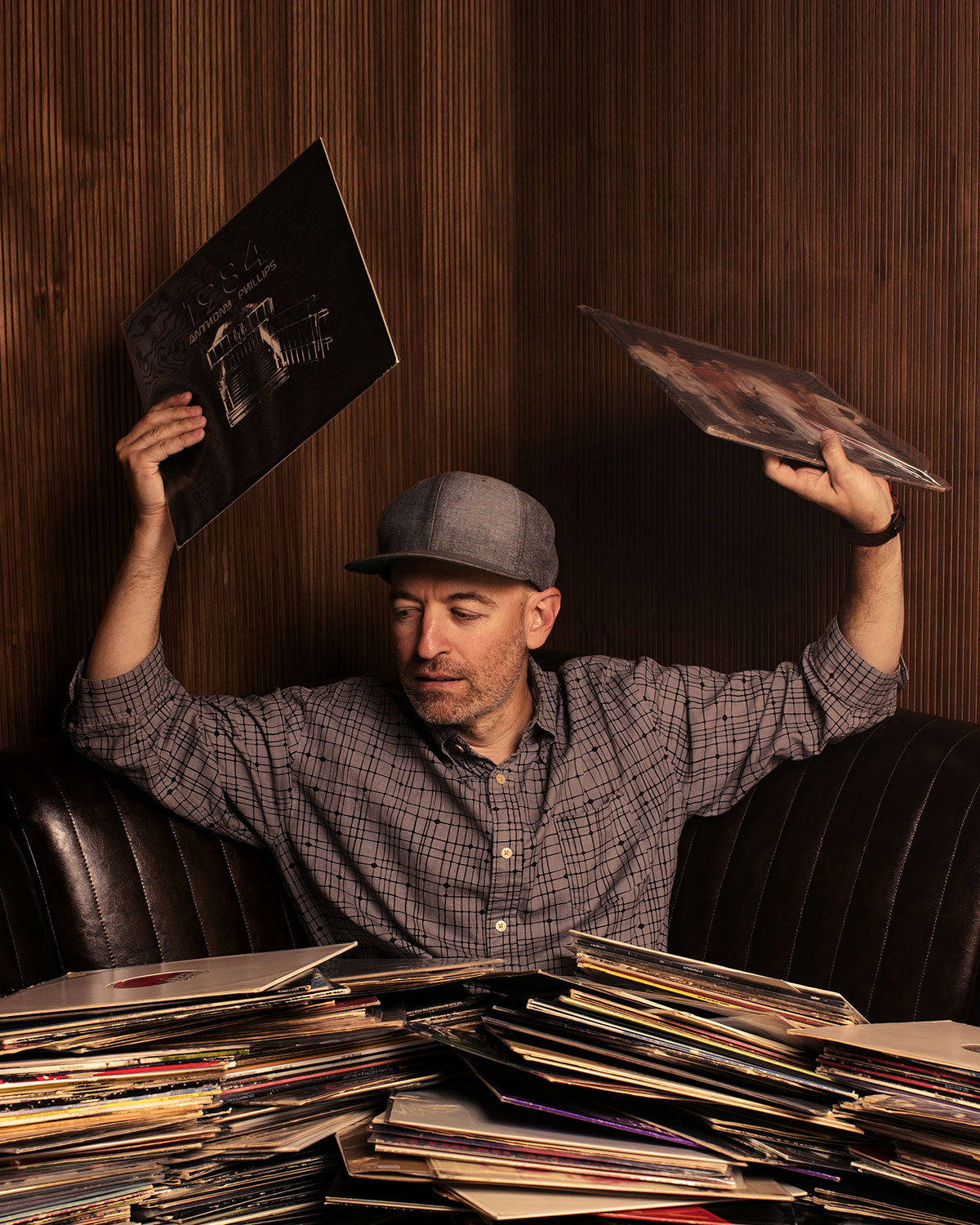
Peanut Butter Wolf (pictured in 2025), the album's executive producer

Dan Charnas, the author of Dilla Time, presented a different version of events. According to his 2022 book, written based on nearly 200 interviews he conducted, the album began as a beat tape made by J Dilla but was largely finished by Stones Throw's art director Jeff Jank. Citing people close to J Dilla, Charnas asserted that the original version of Donuts was not recorded in the hospital, but rather at home, using Pro Tools audio editing software. He pointed out that time stretching used throughout the album is impossible to achieve on an Akai MPC drum machine J Dilla used previously. The author concluded that while publications created the "dramatic creation story" of Donuts, based on the reports of J Dilla's condition and equipment being placed in his hospital room, Stones Throw, who at the time faced financial difficulties, chose not to refute it, as it increased popularity of the record and consequently its sales.

When Peanut Butter Wolf refused to ask J Dilla, weakened, for any new material, Jeff Jank came up with an idea to release an extended version of the Donuts beat tape, which originally consisted of 27 tracks and was shorter than 30 minutes. However, when they asked J Dilla about making a longer version, he replied: "Why don't y'all do that?" Jank agreed to work on the album, while J Dilla focused on The Shining (2006), a follow-up to Welcome 2 Detroit. Due to other artists frustrating J Dilla with constant requests for multitrack versions of his beats, Jank chose to use the stereo mixed beat tape as a source, rather than ask him for multitrack project files. He started with minor adjustments, but gradually progressed to larger edits: the first one, which he used to find out what J Dilla thought of his work, was combining two tracks into one, titled "Workinonit". J Dilla approved of it and Jank continued his work. Later, he asked J Dilla for more material, as he thought the resulting album was still too short. J Dilla gave him a CD with nine more beats, which Jank placed towards the end of the album. Jank named tracks on Donuts himself, but showed J Dilla the final tracklist; he approved it, laughing at a couple of names.

== Composition ==
=== Overview ===
Donuts is an instrumental hip-hop, alternative hip-hop and plunderphonics album containing 31 tracks; the only lyrics on it are short phrases and gasps taken from various records. Most songs usually run for 1–1.5 minutes, consist of looped jazz and soul samples, and vary in style and tone; said tracks also start and end abruptly. The track order is also unusual: the album begins with an outro and ends with an intro. Collin Robinson of Stereogum believed it was a metaphor for J Dilla's sampling. Clash called the album "a conversation between two completely different producers". The original press release for the album compared it to scanning radio stations in an unfamiliar city, while J Dilla described it as a compilation of music he thought as "a little too much for the MCs."

=== Tracks ===
The album contains 34 different samples for its 31 tracks, ranging from Canada's Motherlode to unbridled soul of Motown artists via the Temptations and Smokey Robinson & the Miracles. Following the outro, the album opens with "Workinonit", a short, moody introduction that explodes into chopped guitar riffs, grooving drums, soulful vocal stabs, and sirens—a sonic signature of the record. Built around a sample from 10cc's "The Worst Band in the World", the track gradually shifts from an uplifting guitar groove to a distressed, wailing climax.

This chaotic energy settles into "Waves", where Dilla flips a 10cc sample into an off-kilter groove layered with syncopated drums, making the original sound more soulful. Tracks like "Light My Fire" and "The New" lean into experimentation, the latter filled with subtle chants and ad-libs. A return to emotional weight comes with "Stop!", beginning with the Jadakiss line, "Is death real?", before flipping Dionne Warwick's "You're Gonna Need Me" into a meditation of mortality. The track builds when Warwick cries "Stop!"—a moment that loops until abruptly giving way to the afro-beat influenced "People". The track samples Eddie Kendricks' "People... Hold On" and restructures the sample saying, "people, the time has come," followed by a stripped-down arrangement and tempo changes underscored by the repeated plea, "my people, hold on."

"The Diff'rence" samples Kool & the Gang's "Fruitman" under what critics consider "Stevie-like piano licks", while the distorted intro of "Mash" twists its piano loop with an off-kilter flair. On "Time: The Donut of the Heart", J Dilla slows the Jackson 5's "All I Do Is Think of You" to half-speed, layering a warm guitar loop with chopped vocals for a sparse yet emotionally charged effect, also sampling two tracks by Sweet Charles Sherrell. After the ambiguous track, "Glazed", "Airworks" uses an evolving chop-based beat where the vibrato of the sampled singer lingers hauntingly. The playful "Lightworks" employs vintage electronic samples and a bouncing bassline, while "Stepson of the Clapper" integrates a kick drum that sidechains with crowd cheering, pushing the album's experimental edges. "The Twister (Huh, What)" follows, described as featuring "flu-sick flutes chiming in time to a busted weathervane."

"Time: The Donut of the Heart"
"Time: The Donut of the Heart" mashes The Jackson 5 with two tracks by Sweet Charles Sherrell to create a rhythmic guitar loop, considered "emotionally chilling and structurally sparse".

"Don't Cry"
"Don't Cry", a standout track, manipulates a chopped sample of The Escorts, slowing it down and then speeding it up, layering piano loops and harmonies together to create a two-minute piece both soothing and subtly unsettling.

The midsection includes "One Eleven" and "Two Can Win," the latter transitioning seamlessly into "Don't Cry", built from the Escorts' "I Can't Stand (To See You Cry)" The sample is chopped into eighth-note slices, looped with delicate piano flourishes and emotive harmonies that swell into what critics called "a soul-stirring capsule." "Anti-American Graffiti" blends mournful guitar, pounding drums, and raw vocals in what one writer described as "lighters-up, love-not-war humility." Following the East Coast-inspired "Geek Down", "Thunder" brings in a heavy piano loop and pulsing groove, while "Gobstopper" bursts with brassy stabs over acoustic bass and booming drums. "One for Ghost", a line from Luther Ingram—"She used to whip me with a strap when I was bad"—is reworked, with the word "bad" peppered rhythmically across the track to create an unorthodox swing from a 4/4 loop. The melancholic "Walkinonit" continues the theme, chopping a sorrowful vocal sample that closes with the haunting line, "Baby walk on by."

As the album winds down, "The Factory" leans into experimental noise, while "U-Love" offers a simple piano ballad loop rephrased as "I really love you"—a message interpreted as J Dilla's farewell to his loved ones. "Bye." (the prelude to the track, "So Far to Go", featuring Common and D'Angelo, from The Shining) samples the Isley Brothers' "Don't Say Goodnight: It's Time for Love (Parts I & II)", converting the original 6/8 R&B rhythm into a swinging 4/4 beat. J Dilla alters the lyric "I want to feel you" into "I feel you," infusing it with interpretive weight. Mirroring the earlier track "Hi.", "Bye." slows its sample and manipulates its smooth vocals to resemble the word "donuts." The following track, "Last Donut of the Night", closes the album with a loop of lush strings, twangy guitar, and snapping drums—a bittersweet send-off from J Dilla. The ending of the final track, "Welcome To The Show", flows right into the beginning of the first one, forming an infinite loop, and alluding to the circular form of donuts.

== Release and promotion ==
Donuts was ready to be released by October 2005, but experienced delays as their distributor, EMI, was not convinced that the album would sell past 10,000 copies following Champion Sound's commercial failure. Later, the label came to an understanding with the distributor and the album was set for release in early February 2006, alongside "Signs", a bonus single. Donuts was released on February 7, 2006, J Dilla's 32nd birthday. To celebrate this, his friends, Madlib, Peanut Butter Wolf, Egon, and J Rocc, visited his house. Although J Dilla was generally energetic despite his health condition, he was mumbling and gesturing weakly during that day. Three days later, on February 10, 2006, he died at his home in Los Angeles, California. According to his mother, the cause was cardiac arrest.

Jeff Jank, the Stones Throw art director, designed the album cover. Due to the state of J Dilla's health at the time, it was not possible to compose a new photo for the album's cover. Instead, a still frame from a 2005 videotape of J Dilla hanging out at MED's video shoot for his single, "Push", was used. The raw footage was submitted by director Andrew Gura to Jank. Viewing the photo, Maureen Yancey stated that she thought this photo perfectly captured her son's spirit. The album's title came from J Dilla's personal fondness for donuts.

=== Donuts: J Rocc's Picks ===
To promote the album, Stones Throw, in association with Guitar Center and Adult Swim, released a limited edition EP called Donuts EP: J. Rocc's Picks. The EP contained five extended versions of Donuts instrumentals and the bonus track, "Signs". Copies of the EP were given away on Winter Music Conference (WMC) 2006 and South by Southwest (SXSW) 2006. The label later started selling digital versions of the EP on their official site.

=== Rereleases ===
In January 2013, the album was rereleased as a 7-inch vinyl record box set, also including a bonus 7-inch with tracks "Signs" and "Sniper Elite & Murder Goons", featuring MF Doom and Ghostface Killah. A number of music journalists criticized the box set, stating that the album should be listened as a whole and shouldn't be split. On September 27, 2014, Donuts was released on compact cassettes, as a part of Cassette Store Day.

In February 2016, to celebrate the tenth anniversary of Donuts, the album was rereleased on LP, included the original cover art with Jeff Jank's drawing on it, a new drawing on the back, and liner notes by Jordan Ferguson, containing an excerpt from his book Donuts from 33⅓ series about the making of the album. In 2025, a collectible action figure of J Dilla was released by Super7 for their ReAction Figure brand, modeling him after the album cover.

== Reception and legacy ==
Professional ratings
Aggregate scores
Source	Rating
Metacritic	84/100
Review scores
Source	Rating
AllMusic	5/5 stars
The A.V. Club	B+
Clash	10/10
The Irish Times	4/5 stars
Now	4/5
Pitchfork	7.9/10 (2006); 10/10 (2012)
PopMatters	9/10
Q	3/5 stars
Rolling Stone	3.5/5 stars
URB	4/5 stars

Donuts was released to widespread acclaim from music critics for its dense, eclectic sampling and its perceived confrontation of mortality, and has since become a cult favorite. Being regarded as J Dilla's magnum opus and a classic of instrumental hip-hop, it is one of the most influential hip-hop albums of all time, and many artists of many genres cite it as an inspiration.

The album holds a score of 84 out of 100 on the review aggregate site Metacritic, indicating "universal acclaim". Will Dukes of Pitchfork wrote that Donuts showcases J Dilla paying homage to "the selfsame sounds he's modernized", and in that sense, the album "is pure postmodern art—which was hip-hop's aim in the first place." PopMatters' Michael Frauenhofer described Donuts as an "album of explosions and restraint, of precisely crafted balances and absurd breakdowns, of the senselessly affecting juxtaposition of the most powerful of dreams." The A.V. Club's Nathan Rabin noted J Dilla's "ability to twist and contort samples into unrecognizable new forms" and concluded that "as an album from one of rap's most revered producers on one of hip-hop's most respected labels, Donuts would qualify as a fairly major release under any circumstances, but J Dilla's recent death lends it additional significance and gravity." Andy Kellman of AllMusic wrote that Donuts "has a resonance deeper than anyone could've hoped for or even imagined" given J Dilla's passing shortly after its release, and ultimately "just might be the one release that best reflects his personality". Giving it a three-star honorable mention rating in his review for MSN Music, Robert Christgau called Donuts "more about moments than flow, which is strange when you think about it". In discussing the influence of Donuts on hip-hop producers, Niall Smith of DJ Mag stated that the album became a landmark of loop-based hip-hop production, considering that albums including Kenny Beats' Louie (2022), Knxwledge's 1988 (2020), and BadBadNotGood's numbered albums wouldn't exist without Donuts.

Pitchfork placed the album at number 38 on their list of the top 50 albums of 2006 and at number 66 on their list of the top 200 albums of the 2000s. In a 2007 guest column for Pitchfork, Panda Bear of Animal Collective stated that Donuts was "By far the album I've listened to most over the past year, and I feel like almost any of the songs off there I could say is my favorite." Online music service Rhapsody ranked the album at number three on its "Hip-Hop's Best Albums of the Decade" list. It ranked number nine on Clash's Essential 50 countdown in April 2009, and the magazine later wrote that its "legacy is undeniable". In a 2012 review of the Donuts 45 box set, Pitchfork accorded the album a revised 10/10 rating, with critic Nate Patrin writing: "It's a widely praised favorite for so many people, and yet there's something about Donuts that feels like such an intensely personal statement". Q, in 2017, called it a "tour de force in postmodern beatmaking". The same year, The Boombox placed Donuts at number 33 on their article, "Top 50 Greatest Alternative Hip-Hop Albums of All Time". In 2020, Rolling Stone ranked the album at 386 in their 500 Greatest Albums of All Time.

=== Further track appearances ===
Many rappers have performed over instrumentals from Donuts, both on official and unofficial releases. The tracks "One for Ghost" and "Hi" were used in Ghostface Killah's Fishscale (2006), under the names "Whip You With a Strap" and "Beauty Jackson", respectively. Ghostface Killah also used "Geek Down" for the song "Murda Goons", released on his compilation Hidden Darts: Special Edition (2007). J Dilla's posthumously released album The Shining (2006), also released with new verses on Common's Finding Forever (2007), extends the track, "Bye." After J Dilla's passing, The Roots used "Time: The Donut of the Heart" for their J Dilla tribute "Can't Stop This" on the album Game Theory (2006). In 2007, the track "Mash" was rapped over by MF Doom and Guilty Simpson on the track "Mash's Revenge", which appears on the Stones Throw compilation 2K8 B-Ball Zombie War. Doom also used "Anti-American Graffiti" for the track, "Sniper Elite & Murder Gnome", which appeared on the J Dilla Ghost Doom release Sniperlite, as well as "Lightworks" on a track of the same name on his album Born Like This (2009).

Other rappers that have used Donuts instrumentals include Drake, Nas, Jay Electronica, Big Sean, Charles Hamilton, and Lupe Fiasco. In 2017, Dave Chappelle used "Workinonit" as the theme music for his two Netflix stand-up specials.

== Track listing ==
Donuts track listing
No.	Title	Length
1.	"Donuts (Outro)"	0:11
2.	"Workinonit"	2:57
3.	"Waves"	1:38
4.	"Light My Fire"	0:35
5.	"The New"	0:49
6.	"Stop!"	1:39
7.	"People"	1:24
8.	"The Diff'rence"	1:52
9.	"Mash"	1:31
10.	"Time: The Donut of the Heart"	1:38
11.	"Glazed"	1:21
12.	"Airworks"	1:44
13.	"Lightworks"	1:55
14.	"Stepson of the Clapper"	1:01
15.	"The Twister (Huh, What)"	1:16
16.	"One Eleven"	1:11
17.	"Two Can Win"	1:47
18.	"Don't Cry"	1:59
19.	"Anti-American Graffiti"	1:53
20.	"Geek Down"	1:19
21.	"Thunder"	0:54
22.	"Gobstopper"	1:05
23.	"One for Ghost"	1:18
24.	"Dilla Says Go"	1:16
25.	"Walkinonit"	1:15
26.	"The Factory"	1:23
27.	"U-Love"	1:00
28.	"Hi"	1:16
29.	"Bye"	1:27
30.	"Last Donut of the Night"	1:39
31.	"Welcome to the Show"	1:12
Total length:		43:24

== Personnel ==
Credits are adapted from the album's liner notes.

- J Dilla – producer
- Peanut Butter Wolf – executive producer
- Dave Cooley – mastering
- Jeff Jank – design
- Andrew Gura – photography

== Charts ==
Chart performance for Donuts
Chart (2006)	Peak position
US Independent Albums (Billboard)	21

== See also ==
- Hip-hop production
- Sampling (music)
- Sound collage

== Works cited ==
- Charnas, Dan (2022). Dilla Time: The Life and Afterlife of J Dilla, the Hip-Hop Producer Who Reinvented Rhythm. Farrar, Straus and Giroux. ISBN 978-0-374-72165-7.
- Ferguson, Jordan (2014). J Dilla's Donuts. 33⅓. Bloomsbury Academic. ISBN 978-1623561833.
