= The Shining (J Dilla album) =

Studio album by J Dilla
- Released: August 22, 2006
- Recorded: 2004–2006
- Genre: Hip-hop
- Length: 36:25
- Label: BBE
- Producers: J Dilla; Madlib; Karriem Riggins; J. Rocc

J Dilla chronology
| Donuts (2006) | The Shining (2006) | Jay Love Japan (2007) |

The Shining: Instrumentals
- Cover for the instrumental version

The Shining is the third studio album by American hip-hop producer and rapper J Dilla, who died on February 10, 2006. The Shining was incomplete at the time of J Dilla's passing and was posthumously completed by producer Karriem Riggins. Discounting the instrumental album Donuts, The Shining was the first full-length solo release by J Dilla (featuring newly recorded vocals) since Welcome 2 Detroit five years earlier, and as such was highly anticipated. It was released on August 22, 2006, through BBE Records. It was his final album with his creative input, and an instrumental version of the album followed its release shortly afterward.

== Background ==
In the works for many years under working titles such as the rumored Welcome 2 LA, Dilla's manager, Tim Maynor, said in November 2005 that The Shining would come out in February 2006 on BBE and that the Dilla self-titled album would follow in the same year. While J Dilla underwent treatment at Cedars-Sinai Medical Center for complications brought on by TTP and a form of lupus, he worked on two albums: Donuts and The Shining using a Boss SP-303 sampler and a small 45 record player his friends brought him. Records his mother and friends would bring were used as sample sources. She recalled it in the Crate Diggers documentary:

"As the album was ultimately only 75% complete at the time of J Dilla's passing, his friend and fellow Detroit hip-hop artist Karriem Riggins was entrusted by Dilla's mother and J Dilla himself for the completion and handling of the record. Riggins has indicated that there will be further future releases of Dilla's music in the coming years, stating that "all of his music needs to be heard".

A few of the tracks on The Shining are vocal versions of previously heard material such as "So Far to Go" (Donuts track "Bye" revamped and extended to serve as an intended remix to Common's "Go!"). This song was originally to be released by Common during the last quarter of 2005, as part of a Be special edition package. In 2007, an alternate version of "So Far to Go" containing new verses and a new mix was released on Common's Finding Forever album.

Dilla features some of his past collaborators, such as the aforementioned Common on two songs, Busta Rhymes, D'Angelo, Madlib, and Black Thought on the LP. The closing track, "Won't Do", is the only song to feature Dilla rhyming solo. He also performs on "Baby" together with Madlib and Guilty Simpson and provide the chorus for "E=Mc2". "Won't Do" was also issued as a single (as The Shining EP2), accompanied by a video that premiered on December 12, 2006. The video included appearances by Common, Slum Village, will.i.am, Frank-N-Dank, Karriem Riggins, Black Thought, Talib Kweli, and J Dilla's younger brother, Illa J.

A promo single called "Love", featuring Pharoahe Monch, was leaked onto the internet in February 2006, days after J Dilla's death. Plans for the album's retail release was accelerated and scheduled for April 2006. Video producer and director Brian "B.Kyle" Atkins of Okayplayer Films was in the process of putting together a production consisting of footage he had shot with J Dilla. The label heard about the project and wanted as a bonus DVD to accompany each retail copy of the album. Eventually, however, it was decided to release the two separately. In honor of J Dilla, Atkins created the production entitled J Dilla: Still Shining, which was made available online for free. The album received generally positive reviews and debuted at #103 in its first week of release according to Billboard. An instrumental version of the album soon followed.

The advance copy of the album contains samples from The Shining over the tracks to prevent sharing. These samples are not in the retail version but the advance copy is available on the internet, leading many to believe that the samples are part of the album.

According to J Rocc of the Beat Junkies, Dilla's original idea for the cover of The Shining was to use a photograph of him wearing the CPAP mask used to treat his thrombotic thrombocytopenic purpura at the time; the cover used instead was chosen after his death before the album's completion.

== Influence and legacy ==
J Dilla was known for being experimental, which influenced contemporary musicians who grew up listening to his music. Because he usually chose to enter beats manually on a drum machine rather than quantizing, he developed a "behind-the-beat" style - wherein a track's percussion will play very slightly prior to the 4/4 beat that would be heard on a click-track, in a manner which is perceptible but more minute than would normally ever be written in music notation, giving the impression of the music "dragging behind" the beat - has caught on with young jazz musicians, who are now incorporating it into their music as well, developing techniques to reproduce Dilla's studio style in live performance. J Dilla was also among the first mainstream artists to experiment with tonality in such a liberal way, which is now becoming more apparent in modern electronic music and pop music.

At the time of its release, The Shining was widely considered J Dilla's last opus as it showcased his broad set of talents, showcasing his ability to create distinct beats that would complement each performer that he worked with. The album showed off the growth that he made before his passing by showcasing his experimental nature in different ways throughout this album.

== Reception ==
Professional ratings
Aggregate scores
| Source | Rating |
|---|---|
| Metacritic | 80/100 |
Review scores
| Source | Rating |
| AllMusic | 4/5 stars |
| The A.V. Club | B+ |
| HipHopDX | 4.5/5 stars |
| Now | 5/5 stars |
| Pitchfork | 7.4/10 |
| PopMatters | 7/10 |
| Rolling Stone | 3.5/5 stars |
| Stylus Magazine | B− |
| XXL | XL (4/5) |

At Metacritic, which assigns a weighted average score out of 100 to reviews from mainstream critics, The Shining received an average score of 80% based on 21 reviews, indicating "generally favorable reviews".

It ranked at number 35 on Spin's "40 Best Albums of 2006" list.

== Track listing ==
Unless otherwise indicated, Information is based on Liner notes

| No. | Title | Writer(s) | Producer(s) | Length |
|---|---|---|---|---|
| 1. | "Geek Down" (featuring Busta Rhymes) | James "J Dilla" Yancey, Busta Rhymes | J Dilla | 1:53 |
| 2. | "E=MC²" (featuring Common) | James Yancey, Lonnie R. Lynn | J Dilla | 3:17 |
| 3. | "Love Jones" | James Yancey | J Dilla | 1:01 |
| 4. | "Love" (featuring Pharoahe Monch) | James Yancey, Pharoahe Monch | J Dilla | 3:14 |
| 5. | "Baby" (featuring Madlib and Guilty Simpson) | James Yancey, Guilty Simpson | J Dilla, Madlib | 3:28 |
| 6. | "So Far to Go" (featuring Common and D'Angelo) | James Yancey, Lonnie R. Lynn, Michael "D'Angelo" Archer, Ronald Isley, Rudolph Isley, O'Kelly Isley Jr., Marvin Isley, Ernie Isley, Chris Jasper | J Dilla | 5:36 |
| 7. | "Jungle Love" (featuring MED and Guilty Simpson) | James Yancey, Guilty Simpson, MED | J Dilla | 2:44 |
| 8. | "Over the Breaks" | James Yancey | J Dilla, Karriem Riggins | 2:14 |
| 9. | "Body Movin'" (featuring J. Rocc and Karriem Riggins) | James Yancey, Karriem Riggins, J. Rocc | J Dilla, Karriem Riggins, J. Rocc | 2:17 |
| 10. | "Dime Piece (Remix)" (featuring Dwele) | James Yancey, Andwele “Dwele” Gardner | J Dilla | 3:15 |
| 11. | "Love Movin'" (featuring Black Thought) | James Yancey, Tariq “Black Thought” Trotter | J Dilla | 3:34 |
| 12. | "Won't Do" | James Yancey | J Dilla | 3:52 |

== Personnel ==
- J Dilla - vocals (rap on 2, 5, 12, sung by on 12), tambourine (7), Rhodes electric piano (3), Nord Lead synthesizer (3), Octave Cat synthesizer (7, 9), Micro Korg synthesizer (8), guitar (11), bass played by (11), audio mixing (10)
- Black Thought - rap vocals (11)
- Busta Rhymes - rap vocals (1)
- Common - rap vocals (6, additional on 2)
- Dave Cooley - audio mixing (2–7, 9, 12), recording engineer (5)
- D'Angelo - vocals (sung by) (6)
- Dwele - vocals (10)
- Kelly Hibbert - recording engineer (9, 12)
- Mela "L.A." Machinko - additional background vocals (4)
- Madlib - additional rap vocals (5)
- M.E.D. - rap vocals (7)
- Pharoahe Monch - lead vocals (4)
- Bob Power - audio mixing (1, 11)
- Karriem Riggins - drums (3, 9, 11), Triton synthesizer (8), Korg synth (9), bass programming
- J. Rocc - DJ scratches (2, 9)
- Shotyme - additional background vocals (4)
- Guilty Simpson - rap vocals (7, additional on 5)
- Dontae Winslow - trumpet (3)

== Sample Credits ==
- ”Geek Down"
  - ”Flight of the Bumblebee” (performed) by Temple City Kazoo Orchestra.
  - ”Beethoven's Fifth Symphony” also by Temple City Kazoo Orchestra
- ”E=MC2"
  - ”E=MC2" by Giorgio Moroder (vocal)
- ”Love Jones"
  - ”Humpty Dumpty" by Placebo Jazz Band
- ”Love"
  - ”We Must Be in Love" by The Impressions
- ”Baby"
  - ”Maybe It's Love (This Time)" by The Stylistics
- ”So Far to Go"
  - Based on the J Dilla instrumental “Bye”
  - ”Don't Say Goodnight" by The Isley Brothers
- ”Over the Breaks"
  - ”Does Anybody Know I'm Here" by The Dells
- ”Body Movin'"
  - ”Here We Go (Live at the Funhouse)" by Run-DMC
  - ”B Side Wins Again" by Public Enemy
- ”Won't Do"
  - ”Footsteps in the Dark" by The Isley Brothers
  - ”Alfie” by Dick Hyman

== Charts ==
| Chart | Peak position |
|---|---|
| Billboard 200 | 103 |
| Top Independent Albums | 9 |
| Top R&B/Hip-Hop Albums | 35 |
