= Welcome 2 Detroit =

Studio album by J Dilla
- Released: February 26, 2001
- Recorded: 1999–2001
- Studios: Pay-Jay Studios; Studio A (Dearborn Heights, MI)
- Genre: Hip-hop
- Length: 41:04
- Label: BBE
- Producers: Jay Dee; Karriem Riggins

J Dilla chronology
Welcome 2 Detroit (2001)	Vol. 1: Unreleased (2002)

Professional ratings
Review scores
Source	Rating
AllMusic	3.5/5 stars
The A.V. Club	favorable
Pitchfork	8.5/10
XXL	XL (4/5)

Welcome 2 Detroit is the debut studio album by American hip-hop recording artist J Dilla, released on February 26, 2001. The album followed his group Slum Village's critically acclaimed Fantastic, Vol. 2, and kicked off BBE's "Beat Generation" series (producer-driven albums).

Welcome 2 Detroit bears the name "Jay Dee" as well as "J Dilla", and marks the first time Dilla (who until that point was still known as Jay Dee) officially used the name J Dilla.

== Overview ==
Welcome 2 Detroit is a showcase of the talent from J Dilla's hometown, introducing a pre-Slum Village Elzhi on the song "Come Get It", and making room for his longtime 1st Down partner Phat Kat on the appropriately titled "Featuring Phat Kat".

The album's sound ranges from grimy hardcore hip-hop ("Pause") to electronic psychedelia ("B.B.E."). The track "Rico Suave Bossa Nova" is inspired by Brazilian music group Azymuth. As Dilla mentions in the extensive liner notes:

I fell in love with Brazilian music the day I listened to a Sérgio Mendes album. We used to have jam sessions in the studio after work was done, (and) one day my mans Karriem Riggins came through. I asked him for "Bossa nova". He gave me exactly what I needed.

J Dilla covers Donald Byrd's "Think Twice," singing the lead vocals.

On "African Rhythms", J Dilla covers the Afro beat group Plunky & the Oneness of Juju's song of the same name, replaying all the instruments as well as mimicking the spoken introduction.

On the album's outro "One," J Dilla takes a moment to thank all who have helped him in the hip-hop industry, including Slum Village, Q-Tip and De La Soul. The Pop band 'N Sync is also mentioned. An instrumental version of the album was released on August 23, 2005.

== Track listing ==
All tracks produced by J Dilla except "The Clapper," which is produced by Karriem Riggins and co-produced by J Dilla.

1. "Welcome 2 Detroit" – 0:49
2. "Y'all Ain't Ready" – 1:28
3. "Think Twice" (featuring Dwele) – 3:52
4. "The Clapper" (featuring Blu) – 2:06
5. "Come Get It" (featuring Elzhi) – 5:02
6. "Pause" (featuring Frank N Dank) – 2:45
7. "B.B.E. (Big Booty Express)" – 2:12
8. "Beej-N-Dem Pt. 2" (featuring Beej) – 2:49
9. "Brazilian Groove" (EWF) – 1:30
10. "It's Like That" (featuring Hodge Podge aka Big Tone and Lacks aka Ta'Raach) – 4:05
11. "Give It Up" – 3:08
12. "Rico Suave Bossa Nova" – 1:25
13. "Featuring Phat Kat" (featuring Phat Kat) – 3:43
14. "Shake It Down" – 2:55
15. "African Rhythms" – 1:36
16. "One" – 1:30

Welcome 2 Detroit - The 20th Anniversary Edition

This edition was released on February 5, 2021, on the BBE label, containing the original 16 tracks, with instrumentals, bonus mixes, beats and alternate takes.

1.	"Welcome 2 Detroit"	0:49
2.	"Y’all Ain’t Ready"	1:28
3.	"Think Twice"	3:52
4.	"The Clapper"	2:06
5.	"Come Get It"	5:02
6.	"Pause"	2:45
7.	"B.B.E. - Big Booty Express"	2:12
8.	"Beej-n-Dem Pt. 2"	2:49
9.	"Brazilian Groove (EWF)"	1:30
10.	"It’s Like That"	4:05
11.	"Give It Up"	3:08
12.	"Rico Suave Bossa Nova"	1:25
13.	"Feat. Phat Kat"	3:43
14.	"Shake It Down"	2:55
15.	"African Rhythms"	1:36
16.	"One"	1:31
17.	"Welcome 2 Detroit (Instrumental)"	0:46
18.	"Y’all Ain’t Ready (Instrumental)"	1:29
19.	"Think Twice (Instrumental)"	3:36
20.	"The Clapper (Instrumental)"	1:57
21.	"Come Get It (Instrumental)"	4:25
22.	"Pause (Instrumental)"	2:46
23.	"B.B.E. - Big Booty Express (Instrumental)"	2:09
24.	"Beej-N-Dem Pt. 2 (Instrumental)"	3:07
25.	"Brazilian Groove EWF (Instrumental)"	1:30
26.	"It’s Like That (Instrumental)"	4:08
27.	"Give It Up (Instrumental)"	3:11
28.	"Feat. Phat Kat (Instrumental)"	2:46
29.	"Shake It Down (Instrumental)"	2;54
30.	"African Rhythms (Instrumental)"	1:35
31.	"One (Instrumental)"	1:35
32.	"Think Twice (DJ Muro’s KG Mix)"	3:51
33.	"Think Twice (DJ Muro’s KG Mix Instrumental)"	3:51
34.	"Rico Suave Bossa Nova"	5:53
35.	"Beej-n-Dem (OG)"	0:51
36.	"Brazilian Groove EWF (No Drums, No Vocal)"	1:25
37.	"It’s Like That (Alternate Version)"	3:06
38.	"Give It Up (Acapella)"	1:31
39.	"African Rhythms (No Drums)"	0:44
40.	"Think Twice (Alternate Take)"	3:33
41.	"It’s Like That (Original Beat)"	0:42
42.	"Y’all Ain’t Ready (Cassette Demo)"	1:30
43.	"Think Twice (Cassette Demo)"	3:44
44.	"Come Get It (Cassette Demo)"	4:05
45.	"Come Get It (Alt Beat)"	1:26
46.	"Beej-n-Dem Pt. 2 (Alt Beat)"	3:01

== Personnel ==
- James Yancey - rap, vocals, instruments, production
- Karriem Riggins - drums, percussion, production
- Dwele Gardner - keyboards, trumpet, bass guitar, fender rhodes
- Antwan Gardner - trombone
- Frank Bush - rap, claves
- Derrick Harvey - rap
- Jason Powers - rap
- Ronnie Watts - rap
- Anthony Jackson - rap
- Terrell McMathis - rap
- Blu - rap
- Beej - rap

=== Recording ===
- Recorded at Pay-Jay Studios, Studio A, Dearborn
- Engineered by James Yancey and Todd Fairall
- All songs mixed by James Yancey and Todd Fairall at Studio A, Dearborn.
- Mastered by Shawn Joseph, Optimum Mastering
- Executive producers: Peter Adarkwah and James Yancey
- Co-executive producer: Timotheous Entertainment
- Art Direction and Design: Thomas Mc Callion
