= Black Milk production discography =

The following is a list of productions by American hip-hop producer/rapper Black Milk.

== Production ==
=== 2002 ===
Various Artists - Slum Village Presents: Dirty District

- 08. Elzhi - "Freestyle"
- 09. Black Milk - "Freestyle"
- 10. Ten Speed - "Real Life" (featuring Brown Shoe)

Slum Village - Trinity (Past, Present and Future)

- 04. "What Is This"
- 09. "Trinity (Interlude)"

=== 2003 ===
Phat Kat - The Undeniable LP

- 02. "Door (featuring J Dilla and Fat Ray)

=== 2004 ===
B.R. Gunna - Dirty District Vol. 2

- 01. "Intro" (Produced by B.R. Gunna)
- 02. "Do Ya Thang" (featuring J Dilla) (Produced by B.R. Gunna)
- 03. "Don't Hang Up" (Produced by B.R. Gunna)
- 04. "Jackin'" (featuring Que D and Samiyyah Dixon) (Produced by B.R. Gunna)
- 05. "Motor Boyz" (featuring Marv One and Young Miles) (Produced by B.R. Gunna)
- 06. "Number 1" (featuring King Arubis) (Produced by B.R. Gunna)
- 07. "Dat's Fa Sho" (featuring MC Breed) (Produced by B.R. Gunna)
- 08. "Gunna" (featuring Elzhi) (Produced by B.R. Gunna)
- 09. "Man Up" (featuring Fat Ray, Qwest M.C.O.D.Y., Villen, and Black Milk) (Produced by B.R. Gunna)
- 10. "Get Dat Dough" (featuring Young RJ) (Produced by B.R. Gunna)
- 11. "Alert" (featuring Guilty Simpson) (Produced by B.R. Gunna)
- 12. "MU Freestyle" (featuring MU) (Produced by B.R. Gunna)
- 13. "Stupid" (featuring J Dilla) (Produced by B.R. Gunna)
- 14. "True Story" (featuring Phat Kat) (Produced by B.R. Gunna)
- 15. "Somethin' Good" (featuring Dramatics) (Produced by B.R. Gunna)
- 16. "Hip Hop" (featuring Finale, Invincible and AHK) (Produced by B.R. Gunna)
- 17. "Stixs" (Produced by B.R. Gunna)
- 18. "Outro" (Produced by B.R. Gunna)

Slum Village - Detroit Deli (A Taste of Detroit)

- 01. "Zoom" (featuring Phat Kat) (Produced by B.R. Gunna)
- 03. "Dirty" (featuring Dirt McGirt) (Produced by B.R. Gunna)
- 04. "Late 80's" (Skit) (Produced by B.R. Gunna)
- 08. "Keep Holding On" (featuring Melanie Rutherford) (Produced by B.R. Gunna)
- 09. "It's On" (featuring MC Breed and Big Herk) (Produced by B.R. Gunna)
- 10. "The Hours" (Produced by B.R. Gunna)
- 11. "Things We Do" (Produced by B.R. Gunna)
- 13. "Reunion" (featuring J Dilla) (Produced by B.R. Gunna)

Elzhi - Witness My Growth: The Mixtape 97-04

- 16. "Are U Ready (Gunna)"
- 18. "No Need For Alarm" (featuring Yakknus)
- 21. "Say How I Feel" (Slum Village Remix) (Rhian Benson featuring Slum Village and Dwele) (Produced by B.R. Gunna)

=== 2005 ===
Canibus - Hip-Hop for Sale

- 08. "Da Facelift"

Fat Killahz - Guess Who's Coming to Dinner?

- 02. "Get Ya' Paper" (Produced by B.R. Gunna)

Invincible - Last Warning: Bootleg Mixtape

- 07. "Last Warning" (featuring Finale) (Produced by B.R. Gunna)

Black Milk - Sound of the City, Vol. 1

- 01. "Intro"
- 02. "Nigga What"
- 03. "Danger" (featuring T3 and Phat Kat)
- 04. "Pimp Cup"
- 05. "Duck"
- 06. "So Gone"
- 07. "This That" (featuring Marv Won)
- 08. "Dirty Horns" (Instrumental)
- 09. "Bang Dis Shit" (featuring Nametag)
- 10. "Swing Dat Far"
- 11. "Sound of the City" (featuring Fat Ray and Elzhi)
- 12. "Dirty Guitar" (Instrumental)
- 13. "Eternal" (featuring Baatin)
- 14. "Applause"
- 15. "Holla Like You Know Me" (featuring Que Diesel)
- 16. "Outro"
- 17. "Hidden Track"

Slum Village - Slum Village

- 02. "Set It"
- 03. "Can I" (Produced by B.R. Gunna)
- 04. "Call Me" (Produced by B.R. Gunna)
- 07. "Multiply" (Produced by B.R. Gunna)
- 09. "Hear This" (featuring Phat Kat and Black Milk)
- 11. "Hell Naw!" (featuring Black Milk and Que D)
- 12. "Ez Up" (featuring J Isaac) (Produced by B.R. Gunna)

Proof - Searching for Jerry Garcia

- 06. "Purple Gang" (featuring Killa Kaunn, T-Flame and Young Famous) (Produced by B.R. Gunna)
- 08. "Gurls Wit Da Boom" (Produced by B.R. Gunna)

=== 2006 ===
Black Milk - Broken Wax EP

- 01. "Broken Wax"
- 02. "Pressure"
- 03. "Keep It Live" (featuring Mr. Porter)
- 04. "U's A Freak Bitch"
- 05. "Tell 'Em" (featuring Nametag)
- 06. "Danger" (featuring T3 and Phat Kat)
- 07. "S.O.T.C." (featuring Fat Ray and Elzhi)
- 08. "Outro"

T3 - Olio: The Mixtape

- 03. "Xtra" (featuring Fat Ray)
- 04. "Heartbreaker" (featuring Guilty Simpson)
- 05. "Ain't Gon't Stop Me"
- 06. "Liar"
- 07. "Talk 2 Me Later"
- 08. "Interlude"
- 09. "Ooh No" (featuring Que D)
- 10. "Open"
- 11. "Detroit" (featuring Mu)
- 12. "You Don't Have 2 B"
- 13. "Paper 2"
- 14. "Nobody" (featuring Big Tone and MonicaBlaire)
- 15. "Yawl" (featuring Black Milk and Elzhi)
- 16. "When You Grow Up"
- 17. "Listen" (featuring Que D)
- 18. "Interlude"
- 19. "I See You"
- 20. "Yeah"
- 21. "Yes, Yes, Yes" (featuring Black Milk)
- 22. "Outro"

Phat Kat - Quiet Bubble: The Mixtape

- 02. "Door" (featuring Black Milk and J Dilla) (Produced by B.R. Gunna)
- 03. "Polo Shit" (featuring Fat Ray) (Produced by B.R. Gunna)
- 07. "True Story" (Produced by B.R. Gunna)
- 15. "Danger" (Black Milk featuring Phat Kat and T3)
- 16. "Cash 'Em Out" (featuring Lo Louis)

Lloyd Banks - Rotten Apple

- 00. "Death Wish" (Fat Joe & The LOX Diss) (Leftover)

=== 2007 ===
WildChild - Jack Of All Trades

- 08. "Ox To Tha D" (featuring Frank N Dank)
- 11. "Interviews"
- 13. "Love At 1st Mic"

NameTag - Ahead Of The Basics

- 01. "The Intro"
- 02. "Ahead Of The Basics"
- 04. "Tell 'Em" (featuring Black Milk)
- 06. "So Raw"
- 07. "About You"
- 09. "Action Pack" (featuring B. Stromz, BroadCast and OnPoint)
- 10. "Anotha Club Hit"
- 16. "Momentum Music"
- 17. "Countdown"

Black Milk - Popular Demand

- 01. "Popular Demand"
- 02. "Sound the Alarm" (featuring Guilty Simpson)
- 03. "Insane"
- 04. "Lookatusnow" (featuring Phat Kat)
- 05. "U" (featuring Ty and Kory)
- 06. "Shut It Down" (featuring AHK)
- 07. "So Gone"
- 08. "Say Something" (featuring Nametag and Slim S.D.H.)
- 09. "Play the Keys"
- 10. "Watch 'Em" (featuring Fat Ray and Que D)
- 11. "Three+Sum" (featuring Lil' Skeeter)
- 12. "Action" (featuring Slum Village and Baatin)
- 13. "Luvin' It"
- 14. "One Song"
- 15. "I'm Out"
- 16. "Take It There" (Bonus Track) (featuring One Be Lo)

Now On - Don't Call It A Mixtape

- 02. "The Now On Show"
- 12. "Up At It Again (Black Milk Remix)"

Pharoahe Monch - Desire

- 08. "Let's Go" (featuring MeLa Machinko)
- 10. "Bar Tap" (featuring MeLa Machinko)

Skyzoo - Corner Store Classic (Mixtape)

- 06. "Hold Tight"
- 10. "Play Your Position" (featuring Guilty Simpson)

Phat Kat - Carte Blanche

- 05. "Danger" (featuring T3 and Black Milk)
- 08. "Cash Em Out" (featuring Loe Louis)
- 10. "Survival Kit"
- 12. "Hard Enuff" (featuring Fat Ray)

Taje - Hot Box: The Second Hit

- 12. "Win Or Lose" (featuring Mopreme Shakur)

Strange Fruit Project - The Lost Documents Volume 1

- 01. " The Feeling"

Baatin - Marvelous Magic

- 01. "Marvelous"
- 02. "Magic"

Bishop Lamont & Black Milk - Caltroit

- 02. "Caltroit" (featuring Indef and Chevy Jones)
- 06. "Goatit" (featuring Phat Kat and Elzhi)
- 07. "Go Hard" (featuring Ras Kass and Royce Da 5'9")
- 08. "Mouth Music" (featuring Guilty Simpson and Busta Rhymes)
- 12. "Bang That Shit Out" (featuring Diverse)
- 14. "Ape Shit"
- 15. "Everything" (featuring Kardinal Offishall and Trek Life)
- 17. "Get 'Em" (featuring Trick Trick, Marv One and Fattfather)
- 18. "Spectacular" (featuring Illa J, Frank Nitty and Busta Rhymes)

=== 2008 ===
Torae - Daily Conversation

- 08. "Switch"

Guilty Simpson - Ode to the Ghetto

- 11. "Run" (featuring Black Milk and Sean Price)
- 14. "The Real Me"

Skyzoo - Corner Store Classic (The Remixes)

- 06. "Hold Tight (Remix)" (featuring Black Milk)

Fat Ray & Black Milk - The Set Up

- 01. "Flawless"
- 02. "Lookout" (featuring NameTag)
- 03. "Bad Man" (featuring Guilty Simpson and Scorpion)
- 04. "Take Control" (featuring AB)
- 05. "Not U"
- 06. "When It Goes Down"
- 07. "Get Focus" (featuring Phat Kat and Elzhi)
- 08. "Nothing To Hide"
- 09. "Get Up" (Bonus)
- 10. "Ugly"
- 11. "Outro"

Kidz in the Hall - The In Crowd

- 09. "Middle Of The Map Pt. 1" (featuring Fooch)

Buff1 - There's Only One

- 10. "Never Fall" (featuring Black Milk)

Elzhi - The Preface

- 01. "Intro (The Preface)"
- 02. "The Leak" (featuring Ayah)
- 03. "Guessing Game"
- 04. "Motown 25" (featuring Royce da 5'9")
- 05. "Brag Swag"
- 06. "Colors"
- 07. "Fire (Remix)" (featuring Black Milk, Guilty Simpson, Fatt Father, Danny Brown and Fat Ray)
- 08. "D.E.M.O.N.S."
- 10. "Yeah" (featuring Phat Kat)
- 11. "Transitional Joint"
- 12. "Talking In My Sleep"
- 14. "Hands Up"
- 15. "What I Write"
- 16. "Growing Up" (featuring AB)

Invincible - ShapeShifters

- 01. "State Of Emergency (Intro)"
- 08. "Recognize" (featuring Finale)

GZA/Genius - Pro Tools

- 05. "7 Pounds" *

* The intro of "7 Pounds" is produced by Preservation.

Brooklyn Academy - Bored Of Education

- 16. What's The Buzz (featuring Will Tell)

DJ K.O. - Picture This...

- 12. Skyzoo, Emilio Rojas and Median - "Start It All Over"

Colin Munroe - Is The Unsung Hero (Mixtape)

- 02. "Piano Lessons" (featuring Joell Ortiz)

Pumpkinhead - Picture That (The Negative)

- 15. "Fiyakrakaz"

Black Milk - Tronic

- 01. "Long Story Short"
- 02. "Bounce"
- 03. "Give the Drummer Sum"
- 04. "Without U/Electric Ribbon (Interlude)" (featuring Colin Munroe) *
- 05. "Hold It Down"
- 06. "Losing Out" (featuring Royce Da 5'9")
- 07. "Hell Yeah" (featuring Fat Ray)
- 08. "Overdose"
- 09. "Reppin For U" (featuring AB)
- 10. "The Matrix" (featuring Pharoahe Monch, Sean Price and DJ Premier)
- 11. "Try"
- 12. "Tronic Summer"
- 13. "Bond 4 Life (Music)" (featuring Melanie Rutherford)
- 14. "Elec (Outro)"

* "Without U" is not produced by Black Milk; at the end of the track, the interlude "Electric Ribbon" is produced by Black Milk.

Fatt Father - Fatt Father

- 02. "Lets Go"
- 08. "Heroes" (featuring The Fat Killahz)
- 12. "Success" featuring Phat Kat & Guilty Simpson)

Ruste Juxx - Sean Price Presents: Indestructible

- 01. "Wipe Off Ya Smile" (featuring Blaze)
- 10. "Duck Down!"

NameTag - Classic Cadence, Vol. 1 (Mixtape)

- 04. "Stylin On 'Em"
- 07. "Pipe Down"
- 10. "Bang Dis Shit" (featuring Black Milk)
- 13. "The Lookout" (featuring Black Milk and Fat Ray)
- 15. "Say Somethin'" (featuring Black Milk and Slim S.D.H)
- 16. "Red Alert"

Various Artists - SomeOthaShip: Connect Game EP

- 03. G&D - "Shine On"
- 09. G&D - "Shine On" (Bonus Instrumental)

=== 2009 ===
Blame One - Days Chasing Days

- 02. "Perseverance"

NameTag - Classic Cadence, Vol. 2 (Mixtape)

- 02. "Back On My Shit" (featuring Skyzoo)
- 04. "Stylin On 'Em"
- 16. "Courtesy Of Ambition"

Finale - A Pipe Dream And A Promise

- 05. "One Man Show" (Scratches by DJ Presyce)
- 08. "Motor Music"

Ivan Ives - Newspeak

- 08. "Aeonian Anthem"

Miles Jones - Runaway Jones (August 18, 2009)

- 02. "Never To Late"

Various Artists - The Budget Is Low Mixtape Vol. 1

- 05. Kenn Starr - "Say Goodbye"

KRS-One & Buckshot - Survival Skills

- 03. "The Way I Live" (featuring Mary J. Blige)
- 07. "Runnin' Away" (featuring Immortal Technique)

Skyzoo - The Salvation

- 09. "Penmanship"

Elzhi - The Leftovers Unmixedtape

- 02. "Deep"
- 04. "Like This"
- 05. "Red, Black And Green"
- 13. "5 Man Hustle"

Bishop Lamont & Indef - Team America: F*ck Yeah (Mixtape)

- 07. "Money On My Head"

MarvWon - Way Of The Won

- 11. "Talk About"

=== 2010 ===
Rapper Big Pooh - The Purple Tape (Mixtape)

- 01. "When I’m Done"
- 02. "Blueprint"
- 03. "Impatient" (featuring Ms. Cris)
- 04. "Put It In The Air" (featuring Joe Scudda)
- 05. "Holding Back" (featuring Erica Thompson)
- 06. "Girlfriend"
- 07. "Camera Tricks" (featuring Chaundon)
- 08. "Law & Order" (featuring Jozeemo)
- 09. "Bounce"
- 10. "Say Something" (featuring DJ Flash)
- 11. "Shoutemout"

Nametag - The Name Is Tag

- 02. "Nowhere But Up"
- 04. "Another Other"
- 05. "Celebrate" (featuring Ro Spit)
- 08. "At It" (featuring Danny Brown)
- 10. "City Song"

Black Milk - 7

- 01. "Don Cornelius"
- 02. "Mo Power"
- 03. "Dreams"
- 04. "In the A.M."
- 05. "Set Go"

Black Milk (non-album track)

- "How Dare You"

Black Milk - Album of the Year

- 01. "365"
- 02. "Welcome (Gotta Go)"
- 03. "Keep Going"
- 04. "Oh Girl" (featuring AB)
- 05. "Deadly Medley" (featuring Royce da 5'9" and Elzhi)
- 06. "Distortion" (featuring Melanie Rutherford)
- 07. "Over Again" (featuring Monica Blaire)
- 08. "Round of Applause"
- 09. "Black and Brown" (featuring Danny Brown)
- 10. "Warning (Keep Bouncing)"
- 11. "Gospel Psychedelic Rock" (featuring Melanie Rutherford and AB)
- 12. "Closed Chapter" (featuring Mr. Porter)

=== 2011 ===
A.Dd+ - Loosies (October 4, 2011)

- "Insomniac Dreaming"

Bilal - Non-album track

- "The Dollar (Black Milk Remix)"

Slaughterhouse - Slaughterhouse EP

- 03. "Everybody Down"

Random Axe - Random Axe (June 14, 2011)

- 01. "Zoo Drugs"
- 02. "Random Call"
- 03. "Black Ops" (featuring Fat Ray)
- 04. "Chewbacca" (featuring Roc Marciano)
- 05. "The Hex"
- 06. "Understand This"
- 07. "Everybody Nobody Somebody"
- 08. "Jahphy Joe" (featuring Melanie Rutherford and Danny Brown)
- 09. "The Karate Kid"
- 10. "Never Back Down"
- 11. "Monster Babies"
- 12. "Shirley C" (featuring Fatt Father)
- 13. "Another 1" (featuring Rock and Trick-Trick)
- 14. "4 in the Box"
- 15. "Outro Smoutro"

Black Milk - Third Man Records Blue Series (co-produced by Jack White)

- 01. "Brain"
- 02. "Royal Mega"

Black Milk and Danny Brown - Black and Brown (November 1, 2011)

- 01. "Sound Check"
- 02. "Wake Up"
- 03. "Loosie"
- 04. "Zap"
- 05. "Jordan VIII"
- 06. "Dada"
- 07. "WTF"
- 08. "LOL"
- 09. "Dark Sunshine"
- 10. "Black and Brown"

=== 2012 ===
Skyzoo - A Dream Deferred (October 2, 2012)

- 12. "Steel's Apartment"

=== 2013 ===
Black Milk - Synth or Soul

- 01. "Computer Ugly Ugly"
- 02. "When the Sky Falls"
- 03. "600"
- 04. "Higgs Boson"
- 05. "Piano Moog"
- 06. "80's TV Show"
- 07. "Why Worry"
- 08. "Deep Breath Deep Bass"
- 09. "Heaven's Cry"
- 10. "Wish a N'gga Would"
- 11. "10 Luv"
- 12. "Drunk Tweets"

Black Milk - No Poison No Paradise

- 01. "Interpret Sabotage" (featuring Mel)
- 03. "Codes & Cab Fare" (featuring Black Thought)
- 04. "Ghetto Demf" (featuring Quelle Chris)
- 05. "Sonny Jr. (Dreams)" (featuring Robert Glasper and Dwele)
- 06. "Sunday's Best"
- 07. "Monday's Worst"
- 08. "Perfected on Puritan Ave."
- 09. "Dismal"
- 10. "Parallels" (featuring Ab)
- 11. "X Chords"
- 12. "Black Sabbath" (featuring Tone Trezure)
- 13. "Money Bags (Paradise)"
- 14. "Poison" (Bonus track)

Mel - Burning Stones

- 01. "Hello"
- 02. "Inner Demons"
- 03. "Back At You"
- 04. "Ready"

=== 2014 ===
Black Milk - Glitches in the Break

- 01. "There Are Glitches"
- 02. "Dirt Bells"
- 03. "Ruffin"
- 04. "Silence"
- 05. "1 for Dam" (featuring Fat Ray)
- 06. "G" (featuring Guilty Simpson)
- 07. "Cold Day"
- 08. "Reagan" (featuring Fat Ray)
- 09. "Break"

Skyzoo & Torae - Barrel Brothers

- 06. "All In Together" (featuring Sean Price and Guilty Simpson)

Slum Village - Vintage

- 02. "We on the Go!!!" (featuring Black Milk and Frank Nitt)

Black Milk - If There's a Hell Below

- 01. "Everyday Was" (featuring Mel)
- 02. "What It's Worth"
- 03. "Leave the Bones Behind" (featuring Blu and Ab)
- 04. "Quarter Water" (featuring Pete Rock)
- 05. "Hell Below" (featuring Gene Obey)
- 06. "Detroit's New Dance Show"
- 07. "Story and Her"
- 08. "All Mighty"
- 09. "Scum" (featuring Random Axe)
- 10. "Gold Piece" (featuring Bun B)
- 11. "Grey for Summer"
- 12. "Up & Out"

Brandon Williams - XII

- 02. "Intimidation (So Fine)" (featuring Denaun and Pharoahe Monch)

=== 2015 ===
Kenn Starr - Square One

- 02. "Say Goodbye"
- 05. "The Definition" (featuring Melanie Rutherford)
- 13. "Came To Deliver" (featuring Wordsworth and Supastiton)

Wiki - Lil Me

- 19. "Hate is Earned"

=== 2016 ===
Reks - The Greatest X

- 08. "Liberation"

Danny Brown - Atrocity Exhibition

- 04. "Really Doe" (featuring Kendrick Lamar, Ab-Soul and Earl Sweatshirt)

=== 2017 ===
Wiki & Your Old Droog - What Happened to Fire?

- 01. "We Like Ourselves"

Wiki

- "Progress"

=== 2018 ===
Black Milk - Fever

- 01. "Unveil" (featuring Sudie)
- 02. "But I Can Be" (featuring Aaron “Ab” Abernathy)
- 03. "Could It Be"
- 04. "2 Would Try" (featuring Dwele)
- 05. "Laugh Now Cry Later"
- 06. "True Lies"
- 07. "Eve"
- 08. "Drown"
- 09. "Dive"
- 10. "Foe Friend"
- 11. "Will Remain"
- 12. "You Like To Risk It All / Things Will Never Be"

MED & Guilty Simpson - Loyalty

- 03. "Face Down"

Raiza Biza & REMI - Black Hole Sun

- 01. "Runner" (featuring Baro)
- 02. "Jiggy" (featuring Sampa the Great)
- 03. "Freeman" (featuring Black Milk)
- 04. "Live Stock"
- 05. "P.O.M (Piece of Mind)"
- 06. "Genesis" (featuring Sampa the Great)

Mick Jenkins - Pieces of a Man

- 02. "Stress Fracture" (featuring Mikahl Anthony)
- 03. "Gwendolyn's Apprehension"

Children of Zeus - The Winter Tape

- 06. "Won't End Well"

=== 2019 ===
Black Milk - DiVE - EP

- 01. "Save Yourself"
- 02. "Black NASA" (featuring Sam Austins)
- 03. "If U Say" (featuring BJ the Chicago Kid)
- 04. "Relate (Want 2 Know)" (featuring MAHD)
- 05. "Blame"
- 06. "Swimm" (featuring Phil Swish)
- 07. "DiVE pt.2"
- 08. "Don't Say"
- 09. "Out Loud"
- 10. "TYME"
- 11. "Now Begin"

Little Brother - May the Lord Watch

- 12. "Picture This"

Kemba - Gilda

- 11. "The Feels" (featuring Portugal. The Man) [co-produced with Ivan Jackson]

Berner - La Plaza

- 19. "Kings of the Contraband" (featuring Cypress Hill)

=== 2020 ===
Mick Jenkins - The Circus

- 02. "Carefree"

NameTag Alexander - Work. Win. Repeat.

- 02. "Grands"

Future x Sounds - Collaboration Sessions, Vol. 1

- 02. Black Milk - "Maybe" (featuring Aaron Abernathy & Quelle Chris)

Open Mike Eagle - Anime, Trauma + Divorce

- 02. "Headass (Idiot Shinji)" (featuring Video Dave)

=== 2021 ===
Fat Ray - Santa Barbera

- 06. "Dopeman Heaven" (featuring Danny Brown)

Cypress Hill - R.B.I. Baseball 21 Soundtrack

- "Champion Sound" (later appeared on Back in Black in 2022)

Lion Babe - Rainbow Child

- 02. "Home" (co-produced with Astro Raw)

Rhys Langston

- "Change of Address Form"

Ty Farris - No Cosign Just Cocaine 4

- 03. "You Should Be a Shame"

=== 2022 ===
Cypress Hill - Back in Black

- 01. "Takeover"
- 02. "Open Ya Mind"
- 03. "Certified" (featuring Demrick)
- 04. "Bye Bye" (featuring Dizzy Wright)
- 05. "Come With Me"
- 06. "The Original"
- 07. "Hit 'Em"
- 08. "Break of Dawn"
- 09. "Champion Sound"
- 10. "The Ride"

=== 2023 ===
Black Milk - Everybody Good?

- 01. "God Willing"
- 02. "For How Much?"
- 03. "Wait Til Fate"
- 04. "Downs Got Up"
- 05. "Is It Just Me?"
- 06. "The Black Surf (Everybody Good?)" [featuring Quelle Chris]
- 07. "Let Me Know" (featuring Brandon Myster)
- 08. "Ain't Nobody Coming Down to Save You"
- 09. "Fews & Trues" (featuring Karriem Riggins) [co-produced with Karriem Riggins]
- 10. "Feelings Don’t Feel" (featuring Mick Jenkins)
- 12. "Yeah Really"

M-Dot - Ego And The Enemy 2: A Dissolute Paradise

- 05. "Not Today"

Rim - Rimbrandt 2: Metal Canvas

- 08. "Acts Of Random"

=== 2024 ===
Your Old Droog - Looseys

- 02. "Just Rhyming" (featuring Joey Bada$$ & Styles P)

=== 2025 ===
Black Milk - BLURS

- Entire album

Black Milk & Fat Ray - The Recipe

- Entire album

=== 2026 ===
Black Milk - CEREMONIAL

- Entire album
