= Detroit's Son =

Studio album by Guilty Simpson
- Released: September 11, 2015
- Genre: Hip-hop
- Length: 44:06
- Label: Stones Throw
- Producer: Katalyst

Guilty Simpson chronology
Highway Robbery (2013)	Detroit's Son (2015)	Carved From Stone (2018)

Professional ratings
Review scores
Source	Rating
AllMusic	4/5 stars
Exclaim!	7/10
HipHopDX	4/5
Mojo	4/5
Pitchfork	6/10
RapReviews	8.5/10

Detroit's Son is the fifth studio album by American rapper Guilty Simpson. It was released on September 11, 2015, via Stones Throw Records, marking his third and final solo full-length for the label. Produced entirely by Katalyst, it features contributions from Steve Spacek, Cysion, Elzhi, Fat Ray and Phat Kat.

== Track listing ==
No.	Title	Length
1.	"R.I.P."	3:01
2.	"Blunts in the Air" (featuring Cysion)	2:59
3.	"The D"	3:19
4.	"Ghetto"	1:06
5.	"Detroit’s Son"	3:21
6.	"Fractured" (featuring Fat Ray)	3:07
7.	"Radiation Burn"	2:42
8.	"Money"	2:27
9.	"Smoking" (featuring Spacek)	2:54
10.	"Rhyme 101"	2:34
11.	"The Music"	0:49
12.	"Beautiful Death"	1:22
13.	"Blue Collar" (featuring Elzhi)	3:18
14.	"The Time"	2:17
15.	"Dirty Glove" (featuring Phat Kat)	3:39
16.	"Say What?"	2:29
17.	"Power Outage" (featuring Spacek)	2:42
Total length:		44:06
