= The Preface =

Studio album by eLZhi
- Released: August 12, 2008
- Recorded: 2008
- Genre: Hip hop
- Length: 61:51
- Label: Fat Beats
- Producer: Hex Murda (exec.); Black Milk; T3; DJ Dez; Petey Pistol; Denmark Vessey; Leaf K. Mayfield

ELZhi chronology
The Preface (2008)	Elmatic (2011)

The Preface is the debut album of rapper eLZhi, released 12 August 2008 on Fat Beats Records. It features many other Detroit's MCs including Royce Da 5'9", Guilty Simpson, Black Milk, Fatt Father, Danny Brown and Phat Kat among others. The album has been critically acclaimed and considered by many professional reviewers as one of the best hip hop albums of 2008.

Professional ratings
Review scores
Source	Rating
HipHopDX	4/5 stars
RapReviews	9.5/10
SputnikMusic	4/5 stars
ArtOfRhyme	4.5/5 stars
OkayPlayer	87%
Pitchfork	7.7/10
cokemachineglow	74%

== Production ==
The whole album was produced by Black Milk except for tracks "Save Ya" (produced by T3), "The Science" (produced by DJ Dez), and interludes produced by Leaf K. Mayfield, Petey Pistol and Denmark Vessey.

A great amount of work was put on the songs' drum lines. Black Milk used various hard kicks and snares, which is a common aspect of his production style. The song which displays this fact the best is probably "Guessing Game". However, some tracks are noticeable for their deep and soulful samples such as "Save Ya" or "Transitional Joint".

Eugene "Hexmurda" Howell served as executive producer of the album.

== Songs and content ==
The Preface is known for containing songs which are related to various subjects and themes like dreams, colors or infatuation.

- "Guessing Game", can be considered as an oral "Fill the Blank" game in which the listener has to guess the final 2 syllable word of each bars. According to HipHopMichigan.com's interview, Elzhi said he wrote this song in a couple of hours after listening to Black Milk's beat. On this track, the focus in on wordplays and flow variations..
- On "Colors", Elzhi is using words from the English dictionary which are related to colors like, for example : "Red Cross", "Bluetooth", "Black Mail"... This track could be compared to GZA's "Labels" except that Elzhi is focusing his rhymes on colors and not on record labels. Like for "Guessing Game", he modifies his lyrics through the beats and rhythm variations.
- "Talking In My Sleep" is an immersive track in which Elzhi puts the listener in his dreams and describes different situations: the vision of his mom, to being in a barbershop, to flying through clouds, being in a fistfight, having sex, being chased by a killer armed with a chainsaw (who is possibly his father whom he faces in an inverted house) as well as other images. This track shows Elzhi's capacity for creating patterns, styles and his use of allegories and metaphors, along with his story-telling abilities.

== Track listing ==
No.	Title	Producer(s)	Length
1.	"Intro (The Preface)"	Black Milk	1:02
2.	"The Leak" (featuring Ayah)	Black Milk	3:32
3.	"Guessing Game"	Black Milk	5:38
4.	"Motown 25" (featuring Royce Da 5'9")	Black Milk	3:57
5.	"Brag Swag"	Black Milk	2:41
6.	"Colors"	Black Milk	3:16
7.	"Fire" (remix) (featuring Black Milk, Guilty Simpson, Danny Brown, Fat Ray and Fatt Father)	Black Milk	4:05
8.	"D.E.M.O.N.S."	Black Milk	4:12
9.	"Save Ya" (featuring T3)	T3	4:00
10.	"Yeah" (featuring Phat Kat)	Black Milk	4:14
11.	"Transitional Joint"	Black Milk	4:57
12.	"Talking in My Sleep"	Black Milk	4:19
13.	"The Science" (featuring Fes Roc)	DJ Dez	3:03
14.	"Hands Up"	Black Milk	4:13
15.	"What I Write"	Black Milk	3:40
16.	"Growing Up" (featuring A.B.)	Black Milk	5:02
Total length:			61:51

Notes

- D.E.M.O.N.S.
  - "No Quarter" by Led Zeppelin
- Transitional Joint
  - "Don't Let My Teardrops Bother You" by Dionne Warwick
- Talking in My Sleep
  - "I Can't Wake Up" by KRS-One
  - "Blackman In Effect" by Boogie Down Productions
  - "Ain't No Half-Steppin'" by Big Daddy Kane
