= Album of the Year (Black Milk album) =

Studio album by Black Milk
- Released: September 14, 2010
- Recorded: 2008–2010
- Studio: Music House Studios; Studio 1
- Genre: Hip-hop
- Length: 54:28
- Label: Fat Beats
- Producer: Black Milk

Black Milk chronology
Tronic (2008)	Album of the Year (2010)	Random Axe (2011)

Singles from Album of the Year
- 1. "Welcome (Gotta Go)" Released: June 29, 2010; 2. "Deadly Medley" Released: August 22, 2010

Album of the Year is the fourth solo studio album by American rapper and record producer Black Milk. It was released on September 14, 2010, via Fat Beats Records. Recording sessions took place at Music House Studios and Studio 1. Produced entirely by Black Milk, it features guest appearances from Ab, Danny Brown, Elzhi, Fatt Father, Kon Artis, Melanie Rutherford, Monica Blaire and Royce da 5'9".

The album debuted at number 136 on the Billboard 200, number 28 on the Top R&B/Hip-Hop Albums, number 11 on the Top Rap Albums, number 27 on the Independent Albums and number 3 on the Heatseekers Albums charts in the United States.

== Critical reception ==
Professional ratings
Aggregate scores
Source	Rating
Metacritic	79/100
Review scores
Source	Rating
AllMusic	4.5/5 stars
Beats Per Minute	80/100%
Cokemachineglow	83/100%
HipHopDX	3.5/5
Pitchfork	7.5/10
PopMatters	7/10
Prefix	9/10
RapReviews	8.5/10
Spectrum Culture	3/5
Spin	7/10 marks

Album of the Year was met with generally favorable reviews from music critics. At Metacritic, which assigns a normalized rating out of 100 to reviews from mainstream publications, the album received an average score of 79 based on eleven reviews.

Craig Jenkins of Prefix praised the album, calling it "one of 2010's most innovative and adventurous albums of any stripe, incorporating traces of African jazz, latin music, psych, metal, and more in its relentless attack. It bangs hard from start to finish, and it's guaranteed to send producers scrambling to rerecord their drums in its wake". Jesal 'Jay Soul' Padania of RapReviews wrote: "through soaking in various travails, and pouring them through the microphone, he has truly grabbed us. His beats have almost taken a backseat on this journey but it is worth it just to prove that his story, his journey and his life are much more interesting that a mere drum pattern and a sample". Chet Betz of Cokemachineglow determined: "there's a stunning balance between fluid variations and deviations that in total feel like improvisation and the strictly confined, loping-in-circles gait of traditional hip-hop-a process which then lends itself to being described as simultaneously dynamic and hypnotic, loose and hard, jam and the jam". AllMusic's David Jeffries called it "a major step forward and for the adventurous hip-hop fan, it could very well be appropriately titled". Nate Patrin of Pitchfork declared: "while there was an unspectacular battle-rap anonymity to his past lyrics, they were at least spit in the service of a strong overall style. Now he's grown a bit, upping the emotional dimension subtly and letting some more specific humanistic details come through, even in the lines that read like average boasts on paper". David Amidon of PopMatters concluded: "when taken as a whole, Album of the Year is certainly more exhausting than it deserves to be". Mosi Reeves of Spin wrote: "the crisp arrangements often overshadow his stiff, stentorian delivery, but he still manages to convey moments of both personal loss--the death of mentor/Slum Village rapper Baatin--and professional triumph".

=== Accolades ===
Accolades for Album of the Year
Publication	Accolade	Rank	Ref.
Cokemachineglow	Top 50 Albums 2010	22	
Prefix	Best Of 2010: Prefix's Best Albums Of 2010	26	

== Track listing ==
No.	Title	Writer(s)	Length
1.	"365"	Curtis Cross	4:04
2.	"Welcome (Gotta Go)"	Cross	3:58
3.	"Keep Going"	Cross	4:35
4.	"Oh Girl" (featuring AB)	Cross; Aaron Abernathy	3:26
5.	"Deadly Medley" (featuring Royce da 5'9" and eLZhi)	Cross; Ryan Montgomery; Jason Powers	3:42
6.	"Distortion" (featuring Melanie Rutherford)	Cross; Melanie Rutherford	6:15
7.	"Over Again" (featuring Monica Blaire)	Cross; Blaire White	3:35
8.	"Round of Applause"	Cross	5:26
9.	"Black and Brown/Mad Rapper Skit" (featuring Danny Brown and Fatt Father)	Cross; Daniel Sewell; Sam Beaubien; Shabazz Ford	5:22
10.	"Warning (Keep Bouncing)"	Cross	3:27
11.	"Gospel Psychedelic Rock"	Cross; Rutherford	3:19
12.	"Closed Chapter" (featuring Mr. Porter)	Cross; Denaun Porter	7:19
Total length:			54:28

== Personnel ==
- Curtis "Black Milk" Cross – vocals, Minimoog (tracks: 6, 9, 10), claves, kalimba & xylophone (track 6), piano (track 8), Fender Rhodes (track 12), producer, arrangement, mixing
- Melanie Rutherford – additional vocals (tracks: 1, 6, 11)
- Aaron "AB" Abernathy – additional vocals (tracks: 2–4, 7, 8, 11), bass keys (track 3)
- Ryan "Royce da 5'9"" Montgomery – additional vocals (track 5)
- Jason "eLZhi" Powers – additional vocals (track 5)
- Monica Blaire – additional vocals (track 7)
- Daniel "Danny Brown" Sewell – rap vocals (track 9)
- Shabazz "Fatt Father" Ford – voice (track 9)
- Denaun "Kon Artis" Porter – additional vocals (track 12)
- Tim Shellabarger – bass guitar (tracks: 1, 4–6, 8, 10, 12)
- Justin Jozwiak – flute (track 1), alto and tenor saxophone (track 8)
- Matt Martinez – trombone (tracks: 1, 8)
- Sam Beaubien – trumpet (tracks: 1, 7–9), string arrangement (track 9)
- Daru Jones – additional drums (tracks: 3, 4, 7, 8, 12)
- Ryan Gimpert – guitar (tracks: 5, 6)
- Humberto "DJ Dez" Hernandez – scratches (tracks: 7, 11)
- Michael Rais – double bass (track 9)
- Melissa Roberts – violin & viola (track 9)
- Matt Rautio – french horn (track 9)
- Tommy Hoffman – engineering assistant
- Matt "Magnetic" Oleksiak – mastering
- DJ Jab – executive producer
- Mario "Khalif" Butterfield – art direction, photography
- Eugene "Hex Murda" Howell – A&R, management
- Bill Sharp – A&R, management

== Charts ==
Chart (2010)	Peak position
US Billboard 200	136
US Top R&B/Hip-Hop Albums (Billboard)	28
US Top Rap Albums (Billboard)	11
US Independent Albums (Billboard)	27
US Heatseekers Albums (Billboard)	3
