= Marv Won =

American rapper and record producer

- Also known as: Marv1; Marvwon; Marv One; Marv Wonder; Marvelous Won; Marvin Wonderful
- Born: Marvin Eugene O'Neal; February 4, 1981 (age 45)
- Origin: Detroit, Michigan, U.S.
- Genres: Battle rap; underground hip hop
- Occupations: Rapper; producer
- Years active: 2000–present
- Labels: No Tyze Entertainment; Runyon Ave. Records; My Own Planet; Regina's First; Rappers I Know; The What of Whom
- Member of: Fat Killahz
- Website: Twitter; MySpace; BandCamp; Instagram

Marvin Eugene O'Neal, known by his stage name Marv Won, is an American rapper and record producer from Detroit, Michigan. He is a member of the underground hip hop group, The Fat Killahz (with Fatt Father, Bang Belushi and King Gordy) and rap duo Twin Towers. In 2021, he received a Detroit Music Award nomination for Outstanding Rap MC at the 30th Detroit Music Awards.

== Career ==
O'Neal and Shabazz Ford started The Fat Killahz along with Shim-E-Bango and King Gordy in 2001. The rap group performed at Detroit venues such as the Lush Lounge, the Blind Pig, Motor, St. Andrew's Hall, the Shelter, and the State Theater. In 2002, the group released the 2 Fat, 2 Furious mixtape. The group made an appearance on King Gordy's debut solo album, The Entity, and was the opening act on D12's US tour in 2004. They later released WFKR 31.3 FKM: FK Radio The Mixtape.

On March 15, 2005, the group released their debut studio album "Guess Who's Coming To Dinner?" via No Tyze Entertainment, featuring production by Mr. Porter and B.R. Gunna among others. O'Neal co-produced one track off the record.

=== Way of the Won and Wayne Fontes Music ===
The band members worked on separate projects during Fat Killahz's hiatus until 2011, and O'Neal has appeared on numerous projects by other rappers. In December 2009 he released an eleven track solo album named Way of the Won featuring audio production from Kon Artis and Black Milk, among others, and featuring guest appearances by Danny Brown, Bilal, Fatt Father & Shim-E-Bango. O'Neal was signed to the record label Runyon Ave Records and released his next project Wayne Fontes Music a month after his previous album, on January 1, 2010. The fourteen track LP featured Dwele, Riodata, Fatt Father & Shim-E-Bango.

=== Heavy Is the Head and Twin Towers ===
In 2011, O'Neal and The Fat Killahz reunited to drop their extended play The E.P., and to be featured on Shim-E-Bango's The Bridgecard and Gordy's Jesus Christ's Mistress projects before the band's second hiatus. Denaun Porter re-signed O'Neal on his My Own Planet imprint. The nine-track EP Heavy Is the Head... was released on October 16, 2012. It featured guest appearances from Royce da 5'9", Young R.O.C. and The Fat Killahz, among with audio production handled by both Porter and O'Neal, who also served as executive producers. In 2012, O'Neal appeared in the intro track on Slaughterhouse album Welcome to: Our House.

In 2013, O'Neal & Fatts teamed up as the Twin Towers and recorded several songs.

O'Neal released non-album track "Field Nigga" produced by Big Tone on June 20, 2014 via My Own Planet, and co-produced D12's track "Bane" on Shady XV.

=== Birthday Boys and Soundtrack of Autumn ===
Marv One collaborated with another KingOfTheDot battle rap winner, Illmaculate. The duo dropped their self-titled 7-track extended play Birthday Boys, on their birthday on the fourth of February.

In the Fatt Father's interview made on March 15, 2016 to Extraordinary Nobodies blog, Fatts stated about the Twin Towers that their new material "hopefully it will be released after we both drop our solo projects"

On November 18, 2016, a week after Fatt Father's Veterans Day record release, Marv dropped his fourth solo project, Soundtrack Of Autumn, via Rappers I Know, produced entirely by himself. The ten track album features Boldy James, Nolan The Ninja, Gwenation, The Fat Killahz and a bonus track "Suicide Squad" featured Royce Da 5'9", which was previously released on November 14.

A limited edition vinyl release for Soundtrack of Autumn was released on April 27, 2018 through The What of Whom. For this release, real autumn leaves were pressed inside clear vinyl and also included the two bonus tracks with The Fat Killahz and Royce da 5'9".

=== Battle rap ===
O'Neal rose back around 2000 at Lush's Wednesday open mic nights in Hamtramck, where he learned the ropes with Proof, Obie Trice, D12 and Slum Village. Ever since he's become a staple of freestyle battles. Marv has been prominent on the battle rap scene for more than a decade, gaining international attention since as early as the World Rap Championships. He continues to participate in rap battles sometimes as a double team with Kimani Graham (known as Quest Mcody).. Notable battles include battles against Saynt LA in the final of the KOTD Grand Prix, a title match against Zen for Don't Flop On Beat, and against Shuffle and Marlo with Quest McCody.

== Filmography ==
Marv was one of many Detroit rappers who appeared as an extra in "8 Mile" where he rapped against Eminem in a battling scene. Although that scene was left out of the movie, it was later included as extra content in the DVD release. Marv explained, when the DVD was released, "It was really huge for me because that was one of the main scenes they sold the DVD on. That was the footage they sent to 'Entertainment Tonight,' 'Extra' and 'Access Hollywood'..."

Director and writer Dionciel Armstrong, known for having a hand in the Street Life DVD that introduced the world to Trick-Trick has announced a new independent feature film, Five K One, starring rappers Yukmouth, Big Herk, Quest M.C.O.D.Y., Forty Da Great, Marvwon, Clifton Powell and Melvin Jackson Jr. of The Wire. The film’s score was arranged and mixed by Steve King, who’s long been Eminem’s go-to mixer.

== Discography ==
=== Studio albums ===
- Way of the Won (2005)
- Wayne Fontes Music (2010)
- Soundtrack of Autumn (2016)
- Sooner than Later (2020)
- I'm Fine, Thanks For Asking. (2024)

=== Extended plays ===
- Heavy Is the Head… (2012)
- Birthday Boys (with Illmaculate) (2016)
- Until… (2020)
- Rabbits Can't Shoot (2021)
- Hagler (2021)

=== Guest appearances ===
Year	Title	Artist(s)	Album
2003	"Detroit Pt.2: All City"	Bareda AKA Mr. Wrong, Big Herk, Executive Board, Miz Korona	Wrong As Hale
2004	"Mayhem"	Supa Emcee, Hostyle	Hoodhero
2005	"This That"	Black Milk	Sound Of The City
2006	"Call"	Monica Blaire	Portraits Of Me
2007	"Ruude"	Paradime, Guilty Simpson	Spill At Will
2008	"Can't Fuck Wit' My City"	Trick-Trick, Guilty Simpson	The Villain
2009	"We Rollin'"	Hush, Chino XL, Quest M.C.O.D.Y.	The Open Book
2009	"My Child N Dem"	Quelle Chris, Denmark Vessey	$lutbag Edition
2010	"The Final Tower"	Copywrite, Motion Man, Dom, Poison Pen	T.H.E. High Exhaulted (8th Anniversary Edition)
2010	"On My Detroit Shit"	Seven The General, Big Herk, Esham, Cap, Stretch Money, J Nutty, Young Product, Al Nuke	Sanctum Sanctorum
2010	"How Many?"	Miz Korona, Ketchphraze	The Injection
2011	"Run Shit"	Paul White	Rapping With Paul White
2011	"This Ain't What You Want"	Pumpkinhead, Kid Vishis	Know The Ledge
2011	"Detroit 101"	Ro Spit, Black Milk, Guilty Simpson, Fatt Father, Fat Ray	The Glass Ceiling Project
2012	"The Slaughter (Skit)"	Slaughterhouse	Welcome to: Our House
2012	"Trouble"	House Shoes, Moe Dirdee	Let It Go
2012	"What It Is"	Rome Angel	Five Minz Late
2012	"Power Of The Godz"	Rome Angel, King Gordy	Five Minz Late
2013	"With Open Arms"	Quelle Chris, Fuzz Scoota	Ghost at the Finish Line
2014	"You Ain't Never"	Hush, Cadillac Dale	Danny Boy (The Life & Times of a Kid in the D)
2014	"You Ain't Never (Raw Rugged Mix)"	Hush, Cadillac Dale	Danny Boy (The Life & Times of a Kid in the D)
2015	"Candlelight"	Rapper Big Pooh	Words Paint Pictures
2015	"Slow Stir"	Ro Spit, Kon Artis, Young ROC	IV Life...
2016	"Preacher's Wife"	Jpalm	The Preacher
2016	"Unchanged"	Jpalm	Napalm 2
2016	"Fists Of Fury"	BLK MRKT	Mnply
2016	"I'm Not The One"	Top Prospect, Seven The General, Maestro Williams	TP Is Not Dead
2017	"New York In Detroit"	Notes To Self	TMR II
2019	"Longevity"	Apollo Brown, Trick-Trick, Moe Dirdee, Dez Andres	Sincerely, Detroit
2020	"Look At Me Now"	Fatt Father	King Father
2023	"Wolf Greys"	Paradime, Ty Farris	Period.

== Awards and nominations ==
Year	Nominee / work	Award	Result	Ref.
2021	Himself	Detroit Music Award for Outstanding Rap MC	Nominated	
