= Let It Go (House Shoes album) =

Studio album by House Shoes
- Released: June 19, 2012
- Genre: Midwest hip-hop; underground hip-hop
- Length: 2:03:59
- Label: Tres Records
- Producer: House Shoes

Let It Go is the debut studio album by American DJ and producer House Shoes, released on June 19, 2012, via Tres Records. It featured guest appearances by the likes of Black Milk, Chali 2na of Jurassic 5, Danny Brown, Fatt Father & Marv Won of the Fat Killahz, Gangrene, Guilty Simpson & Hex Murda of Almighty Dreadnaughtz, Roc Marciano, and more. The record is available as double CD album, vinyl and digital download.

== Critical reception ==
Professional ratings
Aggregate scores
Source	Rating
Metacritic	69/100
Review scores
Source	Rating
AllMusic	4/5 stars
Exclaim!	7/10 stars
PopMatters	7/10 stars
RapReviews	7.5/10 stars

At Metacritic, which assigns a normalized rating out of 100 to reviews from mainstream publications, the album received a score of 69, based on 5 reviews. Patrick Taylor of RapReviews praised the album saying, "Most of Let It Go is solid, but there are some skippable tracks". Adam Finlay of PopMatters said, "The result is a more cohesive album than most tight rap collectives". Del F. Cowie of Exclaim! said, "If J. Dilla has been Detroit hip-hop's most influential recent figure, then DJ HouseShoes is the stern, no-frills custodian of that legacy, known to regulate violators and opportunists circling the music James Yancey created". Marcus J. Moore of BBC said, "Excessive interludes drag the runtime and make the project feel a bit unfocused – but these missteps don’t subtract too much from the overall premise".

== Track listing ==
No.	Title	Length
1.	"Let It Go" (featuring Shafiq Husayn)	1:09
2.	"Empire / Get Down"	3:48
3.	"Goodfellas To Bad Boys / Dank Interlude" (featuring Moe Dirdee)	3:47
4.	"Dirt / Jeedo Interlude" (featuring Greneberg)	3:24
5.	"Time / Hex Interlude" (featuring Big Tone)	4:10
6.	"Crazy / Bahbahbahbah" (featuring Black Milk & Guilty Simpson)	2:37
7.	"Last Breath / Mayer & Shoes" (featuring Nottz, Oh No & MED)	4:21
8.	"Keep On / Helluva" (featuring Co$$ aka Cashus King)	3:03
9.	"Sweet / Noodles" (featuring Danny Brown)	3:46
10.	"So Different / Moody Interlude" (featuring Chali 2na)	3:08
11.	"Everything (Modern Family) / Without You" (featuring Fatt Father)	2:24
12.	"Sunrise / Love" (featuring Black Spade)	2:43
13.	"Trouble / Royce Interlude" (featuring Moe Dirdee & Marv Won)	3:42
14.	"Nails / Broken" (featuring Quelle Chris & Guilty Simpson)	3:56
15.	"Castles (The Sky Is Ours) / My Brother" (featuring Jimetta Rose)	4:47
16.	"Cry Now / Gone"	4:07
17.	"Roller Coaster" (featuring Self Says & Fat Albert Einstein)	5:07
18.	"Empire Reprise" (featuring Sam Beaubien of Will Sessions)	2:03

Instrumentals
No.	Title	Length
19.	"Let It Go (The Beginning)"	1:07
20.	"Empire/Get Down"	3:48
21.	"Goodfellas To Bad Boys/Dank Interlude"	3:47
22.	"Dirt/Jeedo Interlude"	3:23
23.	"Time/Hex Interlude"	4:10
24.	"Crazy/Bahbahbahbah"	2:37
25.	"Last Breath/Mayer & Shoes"	4:20
26.	"Keep On/Helluva"	3:03
27.	"Sweet/Quelle Interlude"	3:46
28.	"So Different/Moody Interlude"	3:08
29.	"Everything (Modern Family)/Without You"	2:24
30.	"Sunrise/Love"	2:42
31.	"Trouble/Royce Interlude"	3:42
32.	"Nails/Broken"	3:56
33.	"Castles (The Sky Is Ours)/My Brother"	4:47
34.	"Cry Now/Gone"	4:09
35.	"Roller Coaster"	5:05
36.	"Empire (Reprise)" (Bonus Track)	2:03
Total length:		2:03:59

== Personnel ==
- Michael Buchanan – producer
- Scott "Tenacity" Martin – audio mixing
- Eric Coleman – photography
