= Ode to the Ghetto =

Studio album by Guilty Simpson
- Released: March 25, 2008
- Studio: Area51 Studios (Roswell, MI); Daddy's Room (Corona, CA); Dilla's House (Detroit, MI); Infrasonic Sound (Alhambra, CA); Music House Studios (Detroit, MI); Sumosound
- Genre: Hip-hop
- Length: 47:32
- Label: Stones Throw Records
- Producer: Peanut Butter Wolf (exec.); Madlib; Kon Artis; Oh No; J Dilla; Black Milk; DJ Babu; Konnie Ross

Guilty Simpson chronology
Ode to the Ghetto (2008)	O. J. Simpson (2010)

Singles from Ode to the Ghetto
- 1. "Getting Bitches" Released: 2007; 2. "Footwork" Released: 2008; 3. "Ode to the Ghetto" Released: 2008

Professional ratings
Review scores
Source	Rating
AllMusic	3.5/5 stars
Entertainment Weekly	B−
Exclaim!	favorable
The List	4/5 stars
Pitchfork	4.5/10 stars
PopMatters	8/10 stars
Spin	6/10 stars
XLR8R	8/10 stars

Ode to the Ghetto is the debut solo studio album by American rapper Guilty Simpson from the Almighty Dreadnaughtz. It was released on March 25, 2008, via Stones Throw Records. Production of the album was handled by seven record producers, including Madlib, Mr. Porter, Oh No, J Dilla, Black Milk, DJ Babu, Konphlict, and Peanut Butter Wolf, who served as executive producer. It also features guest appearances from Black Milk, Sean Price, MED, Kon Artis, and Simpson's A.D. groupmates Konnie Ross, Kriz Steel, Supa Emcee.

== Critical reception ==
Steven J. Horowitz of PopMatters gave the album 8 stars out of 10, calling it "one of the most honest and captivating records to come from Detroit's hip-hop scene in recent years." He said, "Simpson covers all the bases of street life on this fantastic debut, and like some Detroit artists who came before him, he offers a unique recounting of the many facets of city life." Meanwhile, Ian Cohen of Pitchfork gave the album a 4.5 out of 10, saying, "Stones Throw interrupts its wise exploration of alternative hip-hop and puts its goodwill on the line in order to release a thoroughly mediocre gangsta rap album."

== Track listing ==
No.	Title	Producer(s)	Length
1.	"The American Dream"	Madlib	2:10
2.	"Robbery"	Mr. Porter	3:20
3.	"She Won't Stay at Home"	Madlib	1:55
4.	"Footwork"	Oh No	3:29
5.	"Ode to the Ghetto"	Oh No	3:27
6.	"Get Bitches"	Mr. Porter	2:19
7.	"I Must Love You"	J Dilla	3:17
8.	"The Future" (featuring MED)	Madlib	2:57
9.	"Pigs"	Madlib	1:49
10.	"My Moment"	Black Milk	2:53
11.	"Run" (featuring Sean Price and Black Milk)	Black Milk	3:40
12.	"Kinda Live"	Mr. Porter	3:19
13.	"Yikes"	Madlib	2:05
14.	"The Real Me"	Black Milk	2:44
15.	"Kill 'Em"	DJ Babu	3:09
16.	"Almighty Dreadnaughtz" (featuring Super MC, Krizsteel and Konnie Ross)	Konnie Ross	5:02
Total length:			47:32

== Personnel ==
- Byron Simpson – main artist
- Denaun Porter – featured artist (tracks: 6, 12), producer (tracks: 2, 6, 12)
- Nick Rodriguez – featured artist (track 8)
- Curtis Cross – featured artist (track 11), producer (tracks: 10, 11, 14), mixing & recording
- Sean DeJean Price – featured artist (track 11)
- Corey Wilson – featured artist & producer (track 16)
- Kent Brown – featured artist (track 16)
- Kriz Steel – featured artist (track 16)
- Noelle Scaggs – additional vocals (track 7)
- Jason Jackson – scratches (tracks: 1, 2, 13)
- Otis Jackson Jr. – producer (tracks: 1, 3, 8, 9, 13), scratches
- Michael Jackson Woodrow Sr. – producer (tracks: 4, 5)
- James Dewitt Yancey – producer (track 7)
- Chris Oroc – producer (track 15)
- Chris Manak – executive producer
- Alex Merzin – mixing & recording
- Mike Chav – mixing & recording
- Pete Lyman – mixing & recording
- Kelly Hibbert – mixing, mastering & recording
- Eothen Aram Alapatt – A&R
- Jeffrey Carlson – art direction
- Eric Coleman – photography
- Eugene Howell – management

== Charts ==
Chart (2008)	Peak position
US Top R&B/Hip-Hop Albums (Billboard)	69
US Heatseekers Albums (Billboard)	23
