= Vices (Paradime album) =

Studio album by Paradime
- Released: October 23, 2001
- Studio: Nation Studios (Detroit, MI); Audio Magic (Eastpointe, MI)
- Genre: Hip hop
- Length: 55:52
- Label: Beats At Will
- Producer: Paradime; Scott Sumner; Mike E. Clark

Paradime chronology
Paragraphs (1999)	Vices (2001)	11 Steps Down (2004)

Professional ratings
Review scores
Source	Rating
AllMusic	4/5 stars

Vices is the second studio album by American rapper Paradime. It was released on October 23, 2001 via Beats At Will Records. Recording sessions took place at Nation Studios in Detroit and Audio Magic in Eastpointe. It featured guest appearances by the likes of Kon Artis and Swifty McVay of D12, Shi Dog and Guilty Simpson of the Almighty Dreadnaughtz, Cansa and Hush, among cameo appearances by Proof, Uncle Kracker and Hex Murda.

Following the release of Vices, Paradime won three Detroit Music Awards in 2002 for Outstanding Hip-Hop Recording, Outstanding Hip-Hop Artist, and Outstanding Hip-Hop MC.

== Track listing ==
No.	Title	Producer(s)	Length
1.	"Intro"	Paradime	0:25
2.	"What I'm All About"	Mr. Porter	3:55
3.	"EP Interlude"		0:33
4.	"Sultan of Slang"	Mr. Porter	3:52
5.	"Armor All"	Ess Man; Paradime (co.)	3:19
6.	"Honda Interlude"		0:24
7.	"The Sentences" (featuring Cansa and Hush)	Hush	4:06
8.	"Girls I Like"	Ess Man	3:30
9.	"Alan Allnuts Interlude"	Scott Sumner	0:43
10.	"All That"	Hush	4:05
11.	"Proof Interlude"		0:32
12.	"Skull Therapy 2002" (featuring Kon Artis and Swifty McVay)	Mr. Porter	4:29
13.	"Dime's Theme"	Mr. Porter	3:48
14.	"Rollin Dope"	Scott Sumner	2:26
15.	"Dirt"	MoSS	3:37
16.	"Brawlin'"	Paradime	3:09
17.	"Uncle Kracker Interlude"		0:28
18.	"Cut Throat" (featuring Shi-Dog and Guilty Simpson)	DJ AMF	4:11
19.	"Hex Interlude"		0:17
20.	"Vices"	MoSS	3:35
21.	"Closure"	Mike E. Clark	4:28
Total length:			55:52

== Personnel ==
- Byron Simpson – guest artist
- Daniel Carlisle – guest artist, producer
- Denaun Porter – guest artist, producer
- Fred Beauregard – main artist, producer
- Michael Earl Clark – producer
- Ondre Moore – guest artist
- Scott Sumner – producer
