= Broken Wax =

EP by Black Milk
- Released: November 21, 2006
- Genre: Hip-hop
- Length: 21:29
- Label: Fat Beats
- Producer: Black Milk

Black Milk chronology
Sound of the City, Vol. 1 (2005)	Broken Wax (2006)	Popular Demand (2007)

Professional ratings
Review scores
Source	Rating
Exclaim!	favorable

Broken Wax is a 2006 EP by Black Milk, a rapper and hip-hop producer from Detroit, Michigan. It features appearances from Mr. Porter of D12, Phat Kat, T3, Elzhi, Fat Ray and Nametag. The instrumental version of the album was included as a bonus disc in Black Milk's next album, Popular Demand.

== Track listing ==
1. "Broken Wax" - 1:10
2. "Pressure" - 2:48
3. "Keep It Live" (feat. Mr. Porter) - 3:13
4. "U's a Freak Bitch" - 3:01
5. "Tell 'Em" (feat. Nametag) - 2:37
6. "Danger" (feat. T3 & Phat Kat) - 3:33
7. "S.O.T.C." (feat. Fat Ray & Elzhi) - 3:51
8. "Outro" - 1:16
