= Sound of the City =

Sound of the City: Vol. 1

Studio album by Black Milk
- Released: October 18, 2005
- Recorded: 2004–2005
- Genre: Hip-hop
- Length: 40:26
- Label: Music House
- Producer: Black Milk

Black Milk chronology
Sound of the City: Vol. 1 (2005)	Broken Wax (2006)

Professional ratings
Review scores
Source	Rating
AllMusic	3.5/5 stars

Sound of the City: Vol. 1 is the first solo release by Black Milk, a rapper and hip-hop producer from Detroit, Michigan. He had previously released material as part of the hip-hop production group, B.R. Gunna, along with Young RJ and Fat Ray.

== Track listing ==
#	Title	Featured guest(s)	Time
1	"Intro"		1:23
2	"Nigga What"		2:23
3	"Danger"	T3, Phat Kat	3:33
4	"Pimp Cup"		3:42
5	"Duck"		1:33
6	"So Gone"		2:31
7	"This That"	Marv Won	3:02
8	"Dirty Horns" (Instrumental)		0:56
9	"Bang Dis Shit"	Nametag	3:13
10	"Swing Dat Far"		2:26
11	"Sound of the City"	Fat Ray, Elzhi	3:51
12	"Dirty Guitar" (Instrumental)		1:27
13	"Eternal"	Baatin	3:42
14	"Applause"		1:53
15	"Holla Like You Know Me"	Que Diesel	3:20
16	"Outro"		0:27
17	"Hidden Track"		1:04
