= If There's a Hell Below =

Studio album by Black Milk
- Released: October 28, 2014
- Recorded: 2013–2014
- Genre: Hip-hop
- Length: 53:22
- Label: Computer Ugly; Fat Beats
- Producer: Black Milk

Black Milk chronology
No Poison No Paradise (2013)	If There's a Hell Below (2014)	FEVER (2018)

If There's a Hell Below is the sixth studio album by Black Milk. The album was released on October 28, 2014, by Fat Beats and Computer Ugly.

== Background ==
The album was self-produced by the artist, and features guest appearances from Blu, Bun B, Pete Rock, Gene Obey, Ab, Mel and Random Axe members Sean Price and Guilty Simpson.

Professional ratings
Aggregate scores
Source	Rating
Metacritic	77/100
Review scores
Source	Rating
AllMusic	3.5/5 stars
Consequence of Sound	B
HipHopDX	4.0/5 stars
Pitchfork	7.3/10
RapReview	7.5/10 stars

== Track listing ==
- All tracks produced by Black Milk.

No.	Title	Length
1.	"Everyday Was" (featuring Mel)	4:11
2.	"What It's Worth"	4:48
3.	"Leave The Bones Behind" (featuring Blu & Ab)	4:25
4.	"Quarter Water" (featuring Pete Rock)	4:58
5.	"Hell Below" (featuring Gene Obey)	4:02
6.	"Detroit's New Dance Show"	5:02
7.	"Story and Her"	6:12
8.	"All Mighty"	5:00
9.	"Scum" (featuring Random Axe)	3:56
10.	"Gold Piece" (featuring Bun B)	4:16
11.	"Grey For Summer"	3:37
12.	"Up & Out"	2:40

== Charts ==
Chart (2014)	Peak position
US Heatseekers Albums (Billboard)	13
US Top R&B/Hip-Hop Albums (Billboard)	40
