= Tronic =

Studio album by Black Milk
- Released: October 28, 2008
- Studio: Music House Studios (Detroit, MI); The Disc; Studio 1
- Genre: Hip-hop
- Label: Fat Beats
- Producer: Black Milk; Colin Munroe

Black Milk chronology
Popular Demand (2007)	Tronic (2008)	Album of the Year (2010)

Singles from Tronic
- 1. "Give the Drummer Sum"/"The Matrix" Released: October 21, 2008; 2. "Losing Out" Released: February 11, 2009

Tronic is the third full-length solo studio album by American rapper and record producer Black Milk. It was released on October 28, 2008, via Fat Beats Records. The album was recorded at Music House Studios in Detroit with additional recording sessions took place at The Disc and at Studio 1. Entirely produced by Black Milk himself, except for the Colin Munroe-produced song "Without U", it features guest appearances from Ab, Fat Ray, Melanie Rutherford, Pharoahe Monch, Royce da 5'9", Sean Price, Colin Munroe and DJ Premier, as well as contributions from John Arnold, Aaron Julison, Dwele, Sam Beaubien, Matt Martinez and DJ Dez.

In the United States, the album peaked at number 76 on the Top R&B/Hip-Hop Albums and number 12 on the Heatseekers Albums charts.

== Critical reception ==
Professional ratings
Aggregate scores
Source	Rating
Metacritic	84/100
Review scores
Source	Rating
AllMusic	4/5 stars
Cokemachineglow	85/100%
HipHopDX	4/5
Now	3/5 Ns
Pitchfork	7.9/10
Prefix	8.5/10
RapReviews	8.5/10
Spin	4/5 stars

Tronic was met with universal acclaim from music critics. At Metacritic, which assigns a normalized rating out of 100 to reviews from mainstream publications, the album received an average score of 84 based on nine reviews.

Chet Betz of Cokemachineglow praised the album, stating: "this, then, is the future fashioned out of the stuffs of past and present, out of maintaining a firm aesthetic while employing a staggering array of techniques, out of reaching for the proverbial stars. Tronic hits with the intrinsic revelation and self-evident relevance of new truth". Nick Neyland of Prefix called the album "isn't quite hip-hop's "Smile", but Black Milk is certainly open to pushing similar boundaries of possibility". Adam M. Levin of RapReviews saw that "Tronic shows marked improvement in Black Milk as the total package; he doesn't excel by sacrificing his rhymes for the sake of the music, or vice versa". AllMusic's David Jeffries wrote: "no filler and a logical running order makes Tronic an instantly satisfying effort, an album to return to, and maybe the best entry point to a discography already filled with vital material". Ian Cohen of Pitchfork resumed: "as was the case with Popular Demand and even the split he did with Fat Ray from earlier this year, you get the odd feeling that Milk put his heart into his work, and yet it feels slightly impersonal, save for the career summary 'Long Story Short'".

In his mixed review for Now, Tim Perlich resumed: "while the production is tight, it's not going to cause rival producers to sell their samplers and look for jobs in air conditioning repair".

== Track listing ==
No.	Title	Writer(s)	Producer(s)	Length
1.	"Long Story Short"	Curtis Cross; Aaron Abernathy	Black Milk	5:04
2.	"Bounce"	Cross	Black Milk	4:37
3.	"Give the Drummer Sum"	Cross	Black Milk	3:54
4.	"Without U/Electric Ribbon (Interlude)" (featuring Colin Munroe)	Cross; Colin Munroe	Colin Munroe	4:49
5.	"Hold It Down"	Cross	Black Milk	4:23
6.	"Losing Out" (featuring Royce da 5'9")	Cross; Ryan Montgomery	Black Milk	4:55
7.	"Hell Yeah" (featuring Fat Ray)	Cross; Ray Boggues II	Black Milk	3:35
8.	"Overdose"	Cross; Humberto Hernandez	Black Milk	3:03
9.	"Reppin for U" (featuring AB)	Cross; Abernathy	Black Milk	4:16
10.	"The Matrix" (featuring Pharoahe Monch, Sean Price and DJ Premier)	Cross; Troy Jamerson; Sean Price; Chris Martin	Black Milk	3:46
11.	"Try"	Cross	Black Milk	3:24
12.	"Tronie Summer"	Cross	Black Milk	2:26
13.	"Bond 4 Life" (featuring Melanie Rutherford)	Cross; Melanie Rutherford	Black Milk	4:58
14.	"Elec (Outro)"	Cross	Black Milk	2:44

== Personnel ==
- Curtis "Black Milk" Cross – vocals, producer (tracks: 1–3, 5–14), recording, mixing
- Aaron "Ab" Abernathy – additional vocals (tracks: 1, 9), piano (track 1)
- Colin Munroe – additional vocals & producer (track 4)
- Ryan "Royce da 5'9"" Montgomery – additional vocals (track 6)
- Ray "Fat Ray" Boggues II – additional vocals (track 7)
- Troy "Pharoahe Monch" Jamerson – additional vocals (track 10)
- Sean Price – additional vocals (track 10)
- Melanie Rutherford – additional vocals (track 13)
- Aaron Julison – bass (tracks: 1, 3)
- Andwele "Dwele" Gardner – flugelhorn (track 1)
- Sam Beaubien – bass clarinet & trumpet (track 3)
- Matt Martinez – trombone (track 3)
- Humberto "DJ Dez" Hernandez – scratches (track 8)
- Christopher "DJ Premier" Martin – scratches (track 10)
- John Ogden Arnold – guitar (tracks: 11, 13)
- Matt "Magnetic" Oleksiak – additional recording (tracks: 1, 3, 4, 6, 7, 9, 13), additional mixing (tracks: 4, 13), mastering
- Tommy Hoffman – additional recording (tracks: 1, 3, 4, 6, 7, 9, 13)
- Eugene "Hex Murda" Howell – executive producer, management
- Mario "Khalif" Butterfield – design, photography, layout
- Bill Sharp – A&R

== Charts ==
Chart (2008)	Peak position
US Top R&B/Hip-Hop Albums (Billboard)	76
US Heatseekers Albums (Billboard)	12
