= Hip-Hop for Sale =

Hip-Hop for $ale

Studio album by Canibus
- Released: November 1, 2005
- Recorded: 2004–05
- Studio: The Durt Factory Studios (Virginia); Big Trophy Studios (California); Detroit
- Genre: Hip-hop
- Length: 41:12
- Label: Babygrande
- Producer: Black Milk; Jay Swift; Jeff Wheeler; J-Hen; J-Starr; Nottz; Tick

Canibus chronology
Mind Control (2005)	Hip-Hop for $ale (2005)	For Whom the Beat Tolls (2007)

Professional ratings
Review scores
Source	Rating
AllHipHop	3/5 stars
AllMusic	3/5 stars
HipHopDX	1.5/5
Now	2/5 Ns
Prefix	3/10
RapReviews	8/10

Hip-Hop for Sale (stylized as Hip-Hop for $ale) is the seventh solo studio album by American rapper Canibus. It was released on November 1, 2005, through Babygrande Records. Recording sessions took place at the Durt Factory Studios in Virginia, at Big Trophy Studios in California, and in Detroit. Produced by Nottz, Jeff Wheeler, Black Milk, Jay Swift, J-Hen, J-Starr and Tick, it features guest appearances from Awon, DMP, Hamza, Ike Infa Diamond, Juli Ecaro and Star.

The album was originally produced entirely by Nottz, but other up-and-coming producers were included on the project as well, such as Jeff Wheeler, Jay Swift, and Black Milk. The reason other producers were included was because in December 2004, over half of the completed material was leaked in the mixtape, The Vitruvian Man, causing tension between Canibus and Nottz. In an interview with SOHH, Nottz revealed he would no longer be working with him, saying Canibus leaked the material, blaming it on his manager Louis Lombard III. The record, which was originally slated to be released on May 10, 2005, was pushed back so Canibus could work on new material for the album. Because Nottz had cut ties with him, Canibus had to reach out to other producers.

== Track listing ==
No.	Title	Writer(s)	Producer(s)	Length
1.	"It's No Other Than..."	Germaine Williams; Dominick Lamb	Nottz	4:05
2.	"Back wit' Heat"	Williams; Lamb	Nottz	3:55
3.	"Benny Riley"	Williams; Jeff Wheeler	Jeff Wheeler	3:54
4.	"Show 'Em How"	Williams; Lamb	Nottz	3:48
5.	"Dear Academy"	Williams; Lamb	Nottz	3:07
6.	"I Gotcha" (featuring DMP)	Williams; J. Reid; Jason Whittaker; Lamb	Nottz	3:47
7.	"So into You" (featuring Juli Ecaro)	Williams; Justin Henderson; Jason Pittman; Kenny "Tick" Salcido	J-Hen; J-Starr; Tick	4:11
8.	"Da' Facelift"	Williams; Curtis Cross II	Black Milk	3:57
9.	"Hip Hop Body Rock"	Williams; Wheeler	Jeff Wheeler	2:52
10.	"Take 'Dat" (featuring Awon, Ike Infa Diamond and Star)	Williams; Antwan Wiggins; D. West; M. Yates; J. Page	Jay Swift	3:34
11.	"Punch Lines" (featuring Hamza)	Williams; D. Taylor; Wheeler	Jeff Wheeler	4:02
Total length:				41:12
