= Paradime =

American rapper

- Also known as: Chubby Jon B; Dime; Paradizzle; Stank Breff
- Born: Frederick Beauregard; November 9, 1974 (age 51)
- Origin: Livonia, Michigan, U.S.
- Genres: Urban contemporary; hip hop
- Occupations: Record producer; rapper; hypeman; DJ
- Instruments: Vocals; keyboards; turntables
- Years active: 1991-present
- Labels: Top Dog; Beats At Will; Mello Music Group
- Member of: Twisted Brown Trucker
- Website: Twitter

Freddie Beauregard (born November 9, 1974), professionally known by his stage name Paradime, is an American rapper and producer.

He is a Northwood University and Detroit Catholic Central alumni.

== Career ==
His first appearance was on the Detroit hip-hop scene in 1991 in the form of a solo album, which sold only a few hundred copies. His first appearance was on the song strategies and tactics by other rapper S.U.N. On the album shining underground in 1998. He was discovered by Kid Rock in 1996 and was taken under Rock’s wing, performing with him and writing songs. Dime was signed with Rock's Top Dog record label.

In 1996 he formed his own independent record label, Beats At Will, and released his debut LP Paragraphs in 1999, which was named the best selling Detroit hip-hop album of '99-'00 by Real Detroit Magazine. He followed up in 2001 with his sophomore record, Vices, which is considered by many to be a Detroit hip-hop classic. It earned Paradime numerous awards and nominations at the Detroit Hip-Hop awards. His most critically acclaimed third full-length LP is 11 Steps Down was dropped in 2004.

In 2023, it was announced Paradime signed to the label Mello Music Group.

== Awards and nominations ==
- Detroit Music Awards
  - 2000 Outstanding Hip Hop Artist (nominated)
  - 2001 Outstanding Hip Hop Artist (won)
  - 2001 Outstanding Hip-Hop MC (won)
  - 2001 Urban/Funk Songwriter (nominated)
  - 2001 Urban/Funk Vocalist (nominated)
  - 2001 Urban/Funk/Hip Hop Recording (nominated)
  - 2002 Outstanding Hip-Hop MC (won)
  - 2002 Outstanding Hip-Hop Artist/Group (won)
  - 2002 Outstanding Hip-Hop Recording - Vices (won)

== Discography ==
=== Studio albums ===
- 1999: Paragraphs
- 2001: Vices
- 2004: 11 Steps Down
- 2007: Spill At Will
- 2023: Period.
- 2024: L

=== Extended plays ===
- 2011: Breaking Beauregard

=== Mixtapes ===
- 2002: Stale Brew Vol 1
- 2003: Stale Brew Vol 2
- 2007: Stale Brew Vol 3
- 2008: Fuck Ya Life (UK release only)
- 2009: Stale Brew Vol 4

=== Guest appearances ===
- 1998: "Strategies And Tactics" by S.U.N. from Shining Underground
- 2000: "Heaven" (with Kid Rock) by Uncle Kracker from Double Wide
- 2000: "Different Forces" by S.U.N. from School Of Thought
- 2000: "Low Down, Grimy" by Shane Capone from Flood These Streetz
- 2000: "What I'm All About" by DJ Butter from Kill The DJ
- 2001: "Truth" by DJ Butter from Shit Happens
- 2003: "Too Far Gone Now" by Hush from Roses & Razorblades
- 2003: "Power Of The Underground" (with Mad Kapp, 5ela, Dogmatic, Strike, Lil Ruck, Dirt Diggla, Proof, Obie Trice, Shim-E-Bango, Undertaka, Wes Chill, King Gordy, Supa Emcee, P. Groove) by SickNotes from The Virus and Sicknote Soldiers
- 2006: "Fatstyle" by Fatt Father from Tales of the Childless Father
- 2006: "Special" (with Guilty Simpson) by Dabrye from Two/Three
- 2008: "Sumthin 4 Da Hataz" (with Fatt Father & Diezel) by Trick-Trick from The Villain
- 2008: "Shay Ride" by Fatt Father from Christmas With Fatt Father
- 2010: "Chokehold" by The Left from Gas Mask
- 2012: "Goose Feathers" (with Aztek The Barfly) by Cancer The Rhino from Grenades, Pistols & Rape Whistles
- 2012: "Jive Soul Brother" by Knox Money from Free Nights & Weekends
- 2019: "Never" by Apollo Brown from Sincerely, Detroit
