= Spill At Will =

Studio album by Paradime
- Released: July 17, 2007
- Genre: Hip hop
- Length: 44:15
- Label: Beats At Will
- Producer: Paradime (also exec.); Astray; Hush; Arhythmetic; Trick-Trick; Kenny Tudrick; Moss; DJ AMF

Paradime chronology
11 Steps Down (2004)	Spill At Will (2007)	Breaking Beauregard (2011)

Spill At Will is the fourth studio album by American rapper Paradime, released on July 17, 2007 via Beats At Will Records. It featured guest appearances by the likes of Guilty Simpson, Trick-Trick, Marv Won, Cadillac Dale, King Jazzy, and Kenny Tudrick.

The album's cover art and title served as a tribute to Ice Cube's Kill At Will EP.

Originally scheduled as an extended play, Spill At Will became a full-length album during its creation. It is also a prequel to his upcoming fifth LP titled The Slow But Inevitable Maturation of Freddie, which supposed to be released in fall 2010.

Dime won Detroit Music Award in category Outstanding National Small/Independent Label Recording.

Professional ratings
Review scores
Source	Rating
RapReviews	7/10 stars

== Track listing ==
No.	Title	Producer(s)	Length
1.	"Whiskey Bar"	Hush	1:32
2.	"They Already Kno"	Arythmetic	3:07
3.	"The Days"	Paradime	3:37
4.	"Irish Eyes"	Paradime	4:13
5.	"The Reaper" (featuring King Jazzy)	Astray	3:56
6.	"What I Got"	Paradime	3:15
7.	"Self Made Man"	Astray	3:26
8.	"Last Call" (featuring Cadillac Dale & Trick-Trick)	Trick-Trick	4:14
9.	"The Water" (featuring Kenny Tudrick)	Kenny Tudrick	5:02
10.	"Ruuude" (featuring Marv Won & Guilty Simpson)	Moss	3:54
11.	"Drunk Again"		3:24
12.	"People Who Died"		4:33
Total length:			44:15

== Personnel ==
- Byron Simpson – guest artist
- Chris Mathis – guest artist, producer
- Daniel Carlisle – producer
- Fred Beauregard – main artist, producer
- Kenny Tudrick – guest artist, producer
- Marvin O'Neil – guest artist
- Stefanie Eulinberg – additional vocals (track 3)
