= House Shoes =

American music producer and DJ

DJ House Shoes
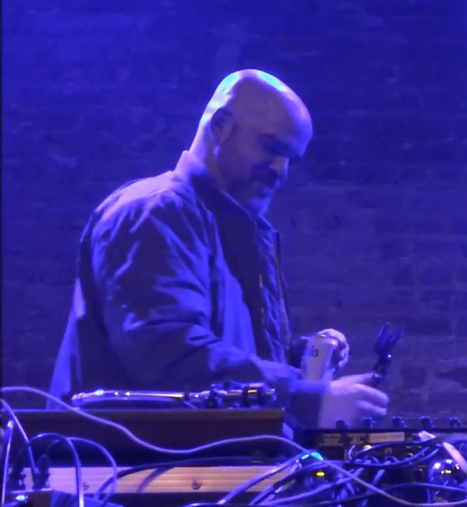
- House Shoes in 2016

Background information
- Also known as: HouseShoes; Smokey the Cat
- Born: Michael Griffith Buchanan; Lathrup Village, Michigan, U.S.
- Origin: Los Angeles, California, U.S.
- Genres: Hip-hop; underground hip-hop
- Occupations: Music producer; DJ
- Years active: 1994–present
- Labels: House Shoes Recordings; Tres Records; Fat Beats; Street Corner Music
- Website: Houseshoes; Twitter

Michael Griffith Buchanan, better known as House Shoes, is an American Detroit-born hip-hop producer and DJ who lives and works in Los Angeles. He served as a producer on albums by Phat Kat, Proof, Elzhi, Pumpkinhead, Marv Won, J Dilla, Danny Brown, and Quelle Chris among others. He is a three-time Detroit Music Awards winner for Outstanding Hip-Hop DJ (from 2005 to 2007).

== Career ==
Buchanan grew up in Lathrup Village. He went to Southfield-Lathrup High School and Eastern Michigan University.

He was a resident deejay at the hip-hop staple St. Andrews Hall from 1994–2004. He worked at a number of record stores, including Melodies & Memories, Street Corner Music and later also worked as a manager for Fat Beats.

As a DJ, Buchanan has toured extensively throughout the U.S. and Europe with artists Guilty Simpson, Illa J, Exile, Aloe Blacc, Percee P, Phat Kat, Slum Village and Elzhi, to name a few, as well as on his own. But he has garnered the respect of acts far outside the scope of Detroit hip-hop. Most recently, Buchanan performed as tour DJ on Mayer Hawthorne & The County's Spring 2010 16-city headlining tour.

House Shoes founded Street Corner Music in 2013.

== Discography ==
=== Studio albums ===
- Let It Go (2012)

=== Compilation albums ===
- The House Shoes Collection Vol.1 : I Got Next (2004)
- House Shoes & Street Corner Music Present: The Gift Vol. 7 (2015)
- The Makings (2016)

=== Extended plays ===
- Do-Over Vol. 1 10", (2010) w/ Flying Lotus
- Los Angeles 4/10 10", (2010) w/ Jordan Rockswell
- Crown Nation EP, (2011) w/ Quelle Chris
- The Time EP, (2012)

=== Instrumental albums ===
- Let It Go Instrumentals (2012)

=== Mixtapes ===
- The King James Version: Chapter 1, Verses 1–5 (2009)

=== Hosted & unsorted ===
- Jay Dee Unreleased, 1997
- Elzhi – Out Of Focus EP, 1998
- Phat Kat – Dedication To The Suckers 12", 1999
- Loungin' Vol. 1 : Live at the Buddha Lounge, 2005
- NowOn – Don't Call It A Mixtape w/ Haircut aka Mayer Hawthorne, 2008
- J1's Starship 27 Volume 2 (compilation): Castles, 2011
- Behind Closed Doors 45: Purist, 2012

== Awards and nominations ==
Year	Nominee / work	Award	Result	Ref.
2005	Himself	Detroit Music Award for Outstanding Outstanding Hip-Hop DJ	Won	
2006	Himself	Detroit Music Award for Outstanding Outstanding Hip-Hop DJ	Won	
2007	Himself	Detroit Music Award for Outstanding Outstanding Hip-Hop DJ	Won	
