= Black and Brown! =

EP by Black Milk and Danny Brown
- Released: November 1, 2011
- Recorded: 2010–2011
- Genre: Alternative hip-hop
- Length: 21:22
- Label: Fat Beats
- Producer: Black Milk

Black Milk chronology
Random Axe (2011)	Black and Brown! (2011)	No Poison No Paradise (2013)

Danny Brown chronology
XXX (2011)	Black and Brown! (2011)	Old (2013)

Black and Brown! is a collaborative EP by Detroit-based rappers Black Milk and Danny Brown. It was released on November 1, 2011, through Fat Beats Records. The EP was produced by Black Milk.

== Reception ==
Professional ratings
Review scores
Source	Rating
Consequence of Sound	C+
Pitchfork	6.5/10
Spin	7/10

Black and Brown! received generally favorable reviews from critics. Metacritic gave the EP a score of 71, based on 5 reviews. Jayson Greene of Pitchfork described the EP as "22 hastily assembled, thoughtlessly sequenced minutes of vivid beats and incredible rapping." Chris Coplan of Consequence of Sound called it "a truly compelling example of what a real collaborative hip-hop album can be."

== Track listing ==
- All tracks were produced by Black Milk.

No.	Title	Writer(s)	Length
1.	"Sound Check" (instrumental)		1:08
2.	"Wake Up"	Curtis Cross; Daniel Sewell	2:27
3.	"Loosie"	Cross; Sewell	2:52
4.	"Zap"	Cross; Sewell	3:30
5.	"Jordan VIII"	Cross; Sewell	1:32
6.	"Dada"	Cross; Sewell	2:03
7.	"WTF" (instrumental)		1:12
8.	"LOL" (remix)	Cross; Sewell	3:01
9.	"Dark Sunshine" (instrumental)		1:12
10.	"Black & Brown"	Cross; Sewell	3:39
11.	"Nandos" (iTunes bonus track)	Sewell	1:14
Total length:			21:22
