= Popular Demand =

Studio album by Black Milk
- Released: March 13, 2007
- Recorded: 2006–2007 at Music House Studios
- Genre: Hip-hop
- Length: 48:53; 24:10 (Bonus CD)
- Label: Fat Beats
- Producer: Black Milk

Black Milk chronology
Broken Wax (2006)	Popular Demand (2007)	Tronic (2008)

Singles from Popular Demand
- 1. "Sound the Alarm" Released: 2006; 2. "Shut It Down" Released: 2007

Professional ratings
Review scores
Source	Rating
About.com	link
AllHipHop	link
AllMusic	link
HipHopDX	link
Nobodysmiling.com	Favorable link
PopMatters	6/10 link
RapReviews.com	7/10 link
Stylus Magazine	B+ link

Popular Demand is the second solo album by Black Milk, a rapper and hip hop producer from Detroit, Michigan. It was released on March 13, 2007, which may be a reference to Detroit's area code, 313. The album features guest appearances from numerous Detroit-based artists, including Slum Village's current members T3 and Elzhi and former member Baatin as well as many of Slum Village's close affiliates, most notably Guilty Simpson, Phat Kat, Que D, and One Be Lo (of Binary Star). As of July 3, 2009, Popular Demand has sold 10,679 units according to Soundscan.

== Track listing ==
#	Title	Sample(s)	Length
1	"Popular Demand"	"You've Been My Inspiration" By The Main Ingredients	2:45
2	"Sound the Alarm" (feat. Guilty Simpson)	"We're a Winner" By The Impressions; "Space Intro" By Steve Miller Band	2:43
3	"Insane"		2:54
4	"Lookatusnow" (feat. Phat Kat)		3:33
5	"U" (feat. Ty & Kory)	Is There A Place (In His Heart For Me)" By The Supremes	3:12
6	"Shut It Down" (feat. AHK)	"Nothing's Gonna Stop Me" By Billy Davis Jr. and Marilyn McCoo	3:59
7	"So Gone"		3:00
8	"Say Something" (feat. Nametag, Slim S.D.H.)	"Behind Closed Doors" By The Originals	4:09
9	"Play the Keys" (Instrumental)		1:53
10	"Watch Em" (feat. Fat Ray, Que D)		4:06
11	"Three+Sum" (feat. Lil' Skeeter)	"Tracks of my Tears" By Aretha Franklin	4:09
12	"Action" (feat. Slum Village)	"Roundabout" By Yes	4:01
13	"Luvin' It" (Instrumental)		1:09
14	"One Song"	"Love Gonna Pack Up" (And Walk Out) By The Persuaders	2:36
15	"I'm Out" (Instrumental)	"If You Can Wait" By The Miracles	2:00
16	"Take It There" (feat. One Be Lo)		2:44

=== Bonus CD ===
Bonus disc containing three tracks from the Broken Wax EP as well as six instrumentals.

#	Title	Sample(s)	Length
1	"Broken Wax" (Instrumental)		1:07
2	"Pressure" (Instrumental)		2:44
3	"Keep It Live" (feat. Mr. Porter)		3:13
4	"U's a Freak Bitch" (Instrumental)	"Baby, Won't You Change Your Mind" by Black Ivory	2:57
5	"Home of the Greats"		3:00
6	"Tell Em" (feat. Nametag)		2:37
7	"Danger" (Instrumental)		3:35
8	"Sound of the City" (Instrumental)		3:41
9	"Outro" (Instrumental)		1:16
