= Fatt Father =

American rapper from Detroit

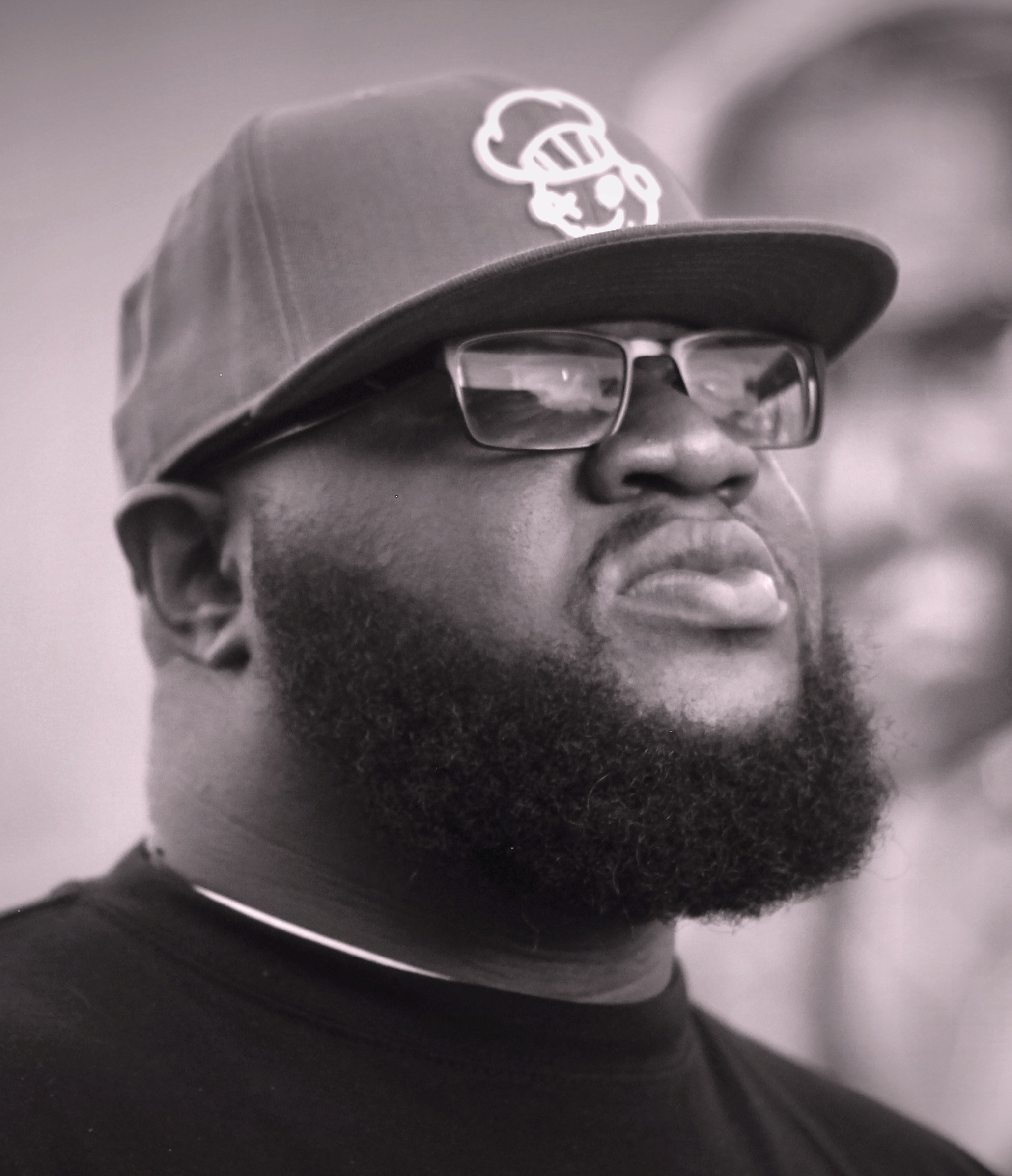
- Fatt Father in 2016

Background information
- Also known as: Fatts; Fathero; King Father
- Born: Shabazz Sinclare Ford; February 17, 1980 (age 46); Detroit, Michigan, U.S.
- Genre: Underground hip hop
- Occupation: Rapper
- Years active: 2000–Present
- Labels: No Tyze Entertainment; Fueled By Life Media Group
- Member of: Fat Killahz
- Website: Fattworld.com

Shabazz Sinclare Ford (born February 17, 1980), known by his stage name Fatt Father, is an American rapper from Detroit, Michigan. He is a one fourth part of the Fat Killahz (with Marv Won, Bang Belushi and King Gordy) and one half of Twin Towers (with Marv Won).

== Early life ==
Shabazz grew up in Detroit with his mother and two brothers, Sammie and Jerry. The oldest, Shabazz was forced at a young age to become the leading male role model he and his brothers never really had. Shabazz found himself with many different roles in the household, which he was not comfortable with at first. He said, "I grew up and I found my niche, which was music". Studying at Denby High School, music was his way to escape his home problems. He said, "Without that, I would have been out on the streets hustling, and doing what I needed to do in order to survive".

== Career ==
Fatt Father made his appearance on the Teamstaz debut album Don't Cross The Line (2000, No Tyze Entertainment).

Fatt Father is a core-member of the Detroit hip hop collective Fat Killahz (formed in 2001). His own mixtapes and street projects range from the classic Tales of the Childless Father to Father's Day on to You Are The Father and Fatherly Advice.

Guess Who's Coming To Dinner?, Fat Killahz debut album, allowed Fatt Father and his group to share the stage with hip hop icons like Ice Cube, 50 Cent, Method Man & Redman as well as Detroit's Royce Da 5'9", Danny Brown, Slum Village, D12 and Trick-Trick.

His debut self-titled album, executive produced by himself and Trick-Trick, enabled Fatt Father to be recognized even without his friends. Over the years he released music such as My Kids Need A Coat which not only showcased his lyrical skill but also shined a light on his loyalty to his children. It was his sophomore album, Fatherhood, that solidified his place as a hip hop heavy-weight.

Fatt Father has also collaborated on records with rappers such as Kuniva, Denmark Vessey, Guilty Simpson, Sean Price, Black Milk, Roc Marciano, Elzhi, and more. Fatts stated Scarface, Notorious B.I.G., Royce Da 5'9", The Temptations and the Fat Killahz as his biggest influence.

== Personal life ==
Shabazz Ford is married and has two children. In 2003, Shabazz’s younger brother Sam was killed at the age of 19, he died on their mother's birthday in 2003. He was a friend of now deceased rappers Chris Cobb and Proof.

In 2014, he started a cartoon project "Storytime With Fattfather" with graphics by Auxiliary Cinema, but only one episode has been released.

In addition to his rap career, Shabazz Ford is a real estate investor and CEO of Fueled By Life Media Group and co-founder of Early Ventures LLC along with his younger brother Jerry Ford.

== Discography ==
=== Studio albums ===
- 2008 - Fatt Father
- 2012 - Fatherhood
- 2016 - Veterans Day
- 2020 - King Father
- 2021 - Soccer Dad

=== Street albums ===
- 2010 - Fatherly Advice (The Legend of James Evans Sr.)

=== Mixtapes ===
- 2006 - Tales of the Childless Father
- 2008 - You are the Father
- 2008 - Christmas With Fatt Father

=== Non-album songs ===
- 2007 - Father's Day
- 2008 - Letter To Barack Obama
- 2009 - B.U.M.S. (Being Underground Makes Sense)
- 2010 - The Corner
- 2015 - My Kids Need A Coat
- 2016 - They Know
- 2016 - Daddy Dearest
- 2016 - Slow Down

=== Guest appearances ===
| Year | Track title | Performer(s) | Album |
|---|---|---|---|
| 2004 | "Runnin' Yo Mouth" | Proof, T-Flame | I Miss the Hip Hop Shop |
| 2005 | "Fat Father (Skit)" | Bizarre | Hannicap Circus |
| 2008 | "Somethin' 4 Da Hataz" | Trick-Trick, Paradime, Diezel | The Villain |
| 2008 | "Fire (Remix)" | Elzhi, Black Milk, Guilty Simpson, Danny Brown, Fat Ray | The Preface |
| 2010 | "Fat Father (Skit)" | Bizarre | Friday Night At St. Andrews |
| 2011 | "Shirley C" | Sean Price, Black Milk, Guilty Simpson | Random Axe |
| 2011 | "The Sun" | Shim-E-Bango, Miz Korona, Invy Da Truth | The Bridgecard EP |
| 2011 | "Detroit 101" | Ro Spit, Black Milk, Guilty Simpson, Fat Ray, Marv Won | The Glass Ceiling Project |
| 2011 | "Change Ya Mind" | Moe Dirdee | Dirdee Motown 2 |
| 2012 | "Everything (Modern Family)" | House Shoes | Let It Go |
| 2014 | "Choices" | Jpalm, Marv Won | Kuklinski |
| 2015 | "Don't Jump" | Charles Lovjoy, Kong Da Monsta, Konphlict | Zodiac Killer |
| 2016 | "Stargazing" | BLK MRKT | Mnply |
| 2016 | "Part Of Me" | Ty Farris, Denmark Vessey | Rydah Music |
| 2016 | "Stayed Down Til I Came Up!" | Hundred Barz | Solace |
| 2016 | "Test My Trill" | Top Prospect, Guilty Simpson, Maestro, Seven The General | The World Is Yours, Vol. 1 |
| 2017 | "Murder Suspect" | Asher Gemini | Caskets On Concrete |
| 2018 | "Stranded" | Dabrye | Three/Three |
| 2018 | "Blackout" | Aztek The Barfly, Hatch | Line King |
| 2019 | "Blue Note Lounge" | Kuniva | The Bando Theory |
| 2019 | "Oh Lord" | Apollo Brown, Journalist 103, Valid | Sincerely, Detroit |
| 2024 | "Measuring Stick" | Marv Won, Elzhi | I'm Fine, Thanks For Asking. |
