= Elmatic =

Mixtape by eLZhi
- Released: May 10, 2011; December 20, 2011 (iTunes)
- Genre: Hip hop
- Label: The JAE.B Group
- Producer: eLZhi (exec.); Will Sessions

ELZhi chronology
The Preface (2008)	Elmatic (2011)	Lead Poison (2016)

Limited Edition

Elmatic is the fifth mixtape by Detroit rapper and former Slum Village member eLZhi. The mixtape is a tribute and a remake of Nas' 1994 classic debut Illmatic. Elmatic was initially released as free download on May 10, 2011, and was later officially released via iTunes on December 20, 2011, with two extra tracks included. The album was acclaimed by critics and praised for its lyrics and production, many publishers and websites have named it on their top list of the year.

== The music ==
Working with Will Sessions was pretty cool. The whole band and myself had a love for the Illmatic album, so when I came to them with the idea they were with it, it was easy, and we all knew that we wanted to put a twist on the music as well as the lyrics. I put forth some ideas and they incorporated it in the music, made it come to life, it was pretty easy working with them. They are some talented cats, it was a blessing having them behind the project.

— eLZhi

== Track listing ==
All lyrics are written by Elzhi; all music is composed by Will Sessions.

No.	Title	Producer	Length
1.	"The Genesis"	Will Sessions	2:36
2.	"Detroit State of Mind"	Will Sessions	4:45
3.	"Halftime"	Will Sessions	2:11
4.	"Memory Lane"	Will Sessions	3:47
5.	"The World Is Yours"	Will Sessions	6:16
6.	"Represent"	Will Sessions	3:09
7.	"Life's A Bitch" (featuring Royce da 5'9" & Stokley Williams)	Will Sessions	5:53
8.	"One Love"	Will Sessions	7:21
9.	"It Ain't Hard to Tell"	Will Sessions	3:48
10.	"Pete Rock Shout"	Will Sessions	6:50

Limited Edition
No.	Title	Producer	Length
11.	"Verbal Intercourse, Pt. 2"	Will Sessions	2:13
12.	"Detroit State of Mind (Remix)"	Khrysis	3:12
