= Fever (Black Milk album) =

Studio album by Black Milk
- Released: February 23, 2018
- Genre: Hip-hop
- Label: Mass Appeal
- Producer: Black Milk

Black Milk chronology
If There's a Hell Below (2014)	Fever (2018)	DiVE (2019)

Professional ratings
Aggregate scores
Source	Rating
Metacritic	80/100
Review scores
Source	Rating
AllMusic	4/5 stars
The A.V. Club	B
The Guardian	4/5 stars
Pitchfork	7.4/10

Fever is the seventh studio album by Black Milk, released on February 23, 2018, on Mass Appeal Records. Black Milk went on tour to support the album in April 2018 with dates in Europe and the United States. The lead single from the album was "Laugh Now Cry Later".

== Reception ==
Fever was met with "generally favorable" reviews from critics. At Metacritic, which assigns a weighted average rating out of 100 to reviews from mainstream publications, this release received an average score of 80 based on 7 reviews. Aggregator Album of the Year gave the release a 78 out of 100 based on a critical consensus of 7 reviews.

Pitchfork described the sound as "something like P-Funk meets the Ummah". 303 Magazine said the album was "so engrossing that it induces a thrill to speak its fresh tracks." Giving it 4/5 stars, the Guardian said "the vibe is gorgeous, featuring guttural but lithe bass and airy whispers of beats". The Detroit Free Press said that it's a "purposeful, progressive leap forward". The Washington Post described it as "pushing the envelope". The 405 suggested that the album was making an early claim for the best hip-hop album of the year. Detroit's Metro Times described Fever as "a diverse array of songs full of Hendrix soul and George Clinton funk". PopMatters said that for this album Black Milk "explores a spectrum of influences that includes jazz and electronica to produce a shifting-sand of styles that defy the genre trappings that have often ensnared lesser hip-hop act".

== Track listing ==
All tracks are written by Black Milk.

No.	Title	Length
1.	"Unveil" (featuring Sudie)	2:54
2.	"But I Can Be" (featuring Aaron “Ab” Abernathy)	3:03
3.	"Could It Be"	3:30
4.	"2 Would Try" (featuring Dwele)	3:33
5.	"Laugh Now Cry Later"	3:53
6.	"True Lies"	4:04
7.	"Eve"	1:24
8.	"Drown"	3:56
9.	"Dive"	2:46
10.	"Foe Friend"	3:19
11.	"Will Remain"	4:43
12.	"You Like To Risk It All / Things Will Never Be"	3:35

== Charts ==
Chart (2018)	Peak position
US Heatseekers Albums (Billboard)	20
