= No Poison No Paradise =

Studio album by Black Milk
- Released: October 15, 2013
- Recorded: 2012–13
- Genre: Hip-hop
- Length: 43:49
- Label: Computer Ugly; Fat Beats
- Producer: Black Milk; Will Sessions

Black Milk chronology
Black and Brown! (2011)	No Poison No Paradise (2013)	If There's a Hell Below (2014)

Singles from No Poison No Paradise
- 1. "Sunday’s Best / Monday’s Worst" Released: March 19, 2013

Professional ratings
Aggregate scores
Source	Rating
Metacritic	78/100
Review scores
Source	Rating
AllMusic	4/5 stars
Consequence of Sound	3/5 stars
HipHopDX	4.5/5 stars
Pitchfork	7.3/10

No Poison No Paradise is the fifth studio album by American rapper Black Milk. The album was released on October 15, 2013, by Fat Beats and Computer Ugly Records. The album was primarily produced by Black Milk himself, and includes guest appearances from artists such as Mel, Ab, Dwele, Black Thought, Quelle Chris, Tone Trezure and Robert Glasper.

== Track listing ==
No.	Title	Writer(s)	Producer(s)	Length
1.	"Interpret Sabotage" (featuring Mel)	Curtis Cross	Black Milk	3:29
2.	"Deion's House"	Cross	Will Sessions	2:33
3.	"Codes & Cab Fare" (featuring Black Thought)	Cross, Tariq Trotter	Black Milk	3:30
4.	"Ghetto Demf" (featuring Quelle Chris)	Cross, Gavin Christopher Tennille	Black Milk	3:20
5.	"Sonny Jr. (Dreams) [Instrumental]" (featuring Robert Glasper & Dwele)	Cross, Robert Glasper, Andwele Gardner	Black Milk	3:25
6.	"Sunday’s Best"	Cross	Black Milk	2:07
7.	"Monday’s Worst"	Cross	Black Milk	3:54
8.	"Perfected on Puritan Ave."	Cross	Black Milk	3:26
9.	"Dismal"	Cross	Black Milk	3:52
10.	"Parallels" (featuring Ab)	Cross	Black Milk	3:00
11.	"X Chords [Instrumental]"	Cross	Black Milk	2:11
12.	"Black Sabbath" (featuring Tone Trezure)	Cross, LaTonya Givens	Black Milk	4:31
13.	"Money Bags"	Cross	Black Milk	4:31

iTunes bonus track
No.	Title	Writer(s)	Producer(s)	Length
14.	"Poison"	Cross	Black Milk	2:10

== Charts ==
Chart (2013)	Peak position
US Heatseekers Albums (Billboard)	11
