= Highway Robbery (Guilty Simpson and Small Professor album) =

Studio album by Guilty Simpson and Small Professor
- Released: September 24, 2013
- Recorded: 2012–2013
- Genre: Hip-hop
- Length: 24:49
- Label: Coalmine Records
- Producer: Small Professor

Guilty Simpson chronology
| Dice Game (2012) | Highway Robbery (2013) |

Small Professor chronology
| Gigantic, Vol. 1 (2012) | Highway Robbery (2013) |

Professional ratings
Review scores
| Source | Rating |
|---|---|
| HipHopDX | 4/5 stars |
| RapReviews | 7.5/10 stars |

Highway Robbery is a collaborative studio album from Detroit rapper Guilty Simpson and Philadelphia producer Small Professor, featuring guests Statik Selektah, DJ Revolution, A.G., Boldy James, Elucid, and Castle. It was released digitally under independent hip-hop label Coalmine Records and imprint Beat Goliath on September 24, 2013.

== Track listing ==
All songs produced by Small Professor.

1. "Take Your Power (Intro)" (1:38)
2. "Get That Pay (Scooby Mix)" (2:25)
3. "I'm The City" (4:21) (featuring Boldy James and Statik Selektah)
4. "Blap (Interlude)" (1:45)
5. "It's Nuthin" (3:08) (featuring A.G.)
6. "On The Run" (2:39) (featuring DJ Revolution)
7. "Go" (2:22) (featuring Elucid and Castle)
8. "Come Get Me (Outro)" (2:03)
9. "Get That Pay (OG Mix)" (2:39)
10. "The Easiest Way (Remix)" (1:43)

== Personnel ==
Credits for Highway Robbery adapted from Allmusic.

- Small Professor – arranger, primary artist, producer
- Guilty Simpson – primary artist, vocals
- Statik Selektah – featured artist
- A.G. – featured artist
- Elucid – featured artist
- Castle – featured artist
- DJ Revolution – featured artist
