= Random Axe =

Studio album by Random Axe (Black Milk, Guilty Simpson and Sean Price)
- Released: June 14, 2011
- Recorded: 2008–2010
- Genre: Hip-hop
- Length: 41:24
- Label: Duck Down
- Producer: Black Milk (also exec.)

Black Milk chronology
Album of the Year (2010)	Random Axe (2011)	Black & Brown EP (2011)

Guilty Simpson chronology
O.J. Simpson (2010)	Random Axe (2011)	Dice Game (2011)

Sean Price chronology
D.I.R.T. (2008)	Random Axe (2011)	Mic Tyson (2012)

Professional ratings
Aggregate scores
Source	Rating
Metacritic	80/100
Review scores
Source	Rating
AllMusic	4/5 stars
The A.V. Club	(B)
Boston Phoenix	3.5/4 stars
HipHopDX	4/5 stars
Okayplayer	(78/100)
Pitchfork	(6.6/10)
PopMatters	(9/10)
Time Out	4/5 stars
URB	4/5 stars
XXL	(XL)

Random Axe is the only studio album from the American hip hop group Random Axe, released June 14, 2011, on Duck Down Music Inc. The group was composed of hip hop producer Black Milk and rappers Guilty Simpson and the late Sean Price. The album was produced entirely by Black Milk and features guest contributions from Roc Marciano, Danny Brown, Fat Ray, Melanie Rutherford, Rock, Trick Trick, and Fatt Father.

== Reception ==
Random Axe received acclaim from music critics. At Metacritic, which assigns a normalized rating out of 100 to reviews from mainstream critics, the album received an average score of 80, based on 12 critics, indicating "generally favorable reviews". AllMusic editor David Jeffries complimented its "literate but loose rhymes, free spirits, and dope beats" and wrote in conclusion, "the album barely crosses the 40-minute mark and it doesn’t bother pleasing the crowd, but it rewards its core audience with a freestyle feel and an uncompromising allegiance to true hip-hop". Nate Santos of XXL noted "forceful lyrics over light flutes, choppy keys and thumping bass" and stated, "the project feels unified, and the three artists mesh well with one another throughout". HipHopDX writer William Ketchum noted Sean Price's and Guilty Simpson's "hard-nosed rhymes with a twist of dark humor", and wrote that Black Milk "eschews his usual soulful, electronic-influenced soundbeds for a collection of tailor-made gritty, percussive bangers". David Amidon of PopMatters called it "a throwback to the mid-‘90s", adding that "because it sounds, and more importantly feels, so unified and right". Cokemachineglow's Chet Betz commended its "hard" aesthetic and "their vision for street rap, undiluted and pure in its filthy flow straight from the gutters".

However, Pitchfork Media's Martin Douglas viewed that the album "feels carelessly phoned in at times" and stated, "the verses are reliably good, but the tedium of clock punching replaces the spirit of competition". Nathan Rabin of The A.V. Club perceived "self-indulgence" and lack of "diversity" in the lyrics, but praised Black Milk's "quietly assured production" and wrote that the group is "more than the sum of its considerable parts". Okayplayer's Niela Orr called Random Axe "a release that’s thematically consistent if not repetitive and evocative of the three’s surefire chemistry" and dubbed Black Milk's production "probably the most positive (feeling-wise) attribute of the album, even though the beats are moody, dark, and gritty". Jesse Serwer of Time Out wrote that Black Milk "finds complementary foils in surly Brooklyn rapper Price (of Boot Camp Clik and Heltah Skeltah fame) and Simpson, a J Dilla disciple whose flow is as intimidating as his name suggests". Boston Phoenix writer Chris Faraone commented that Black Milk "pays aesthetic homage to Madlib and J Dilla's Champion Sound". M.F. DiBella of URB commented that "[Guilty] and Sean Price are blessed with two of the best voices in hip-hop" and stated, "The beats here just make your head drift. Milk has cultivated an electro-centric musical sensibility; a sound every bit as reminiscent of Kraftwerk, Gary Numan & Brian Eno as J Dilla".

== Track listing ==
- All songs are produced by Black Milk.

No.	Title	Writer(s)	Length
1.	"Zoo Drugs" (Instrumental)	Curtis Cross	0:49
2.	"Random Call"	Cross, Sean Price, Byron D. Simpson	4:14
3.	"Black Ops" (featuring Fat Ray)	Cross, Price, Simpson	3:04
4.	"Chewbacca" (featuring Roc Marciano)	Cross, Price, Simpson, Rahkeim C. Meyer	4:06
5.	"The Hex"	Cross, Price, Simpson	3:03
6.	"Understand This"	Cross, Price, Simpson	2:17
7.	"Everybody, Nobody, Somebody"	Cross, Price, Simpson	3:32
8.	"Jahphy Joe" (featuring Danny Brown & Melanie Rutherford)	Cross, Price, Simpson, Daniel D. Sewell	3:43
9.	"The Karate Kid" (performed by Sean Price)	Cross, Price, Simpson	1:02
10.	"Never Back Down" (performed by Guilty Simpson)	Cross, Price, Simpson	1:50
11.	"Monster Babies"	Cross, Price, Simpson	4:05
12.	"Shirley C" (featuring Fatt Father)	Cross, Price, Simpson, Shabazz Ford	3:26
13.	"Another One" (featuring Rockness Monsta & Trick-Trick)	Cross, Price, Simpson, Jahmal Bush, Christian A. Mathis	3:17
14.	"4 in the Box" (performed by Guilty Simpson)	Cross, Price, Simpson	1:32
15.	"Outro Smoutro" (Instrumental)	Cross	1:27

== Personnel ==
Credits for Random Axe adapted from AllMusic.

- Big Dru Ha – associate executive producer
- Black Milk – executive producer, group member, producer
- Buckshot – associate executive producer
- Noah Friedman – project coordinator
- Ryan Gimpert – guitar
- Hexmurda – executive producer
- Daru Jonesv – drums
- Sean Price – executive producer, group member
- Rosalinda Ruiz – artwork
- Tim Shellabarger – bass guitar
- Guilty Simpson – executive producer, group member
- Skrilla – artwork
- Upendo "Pen" Taylor – artwork

== Charts ==
Chart (2011)	Peak position
US Billboard 200	83
US Top R&B/Hip-Hop Albums (Billboard)	15
US Independent Albums (Billboard)	13
