= Guilty Simpson =

American rapper

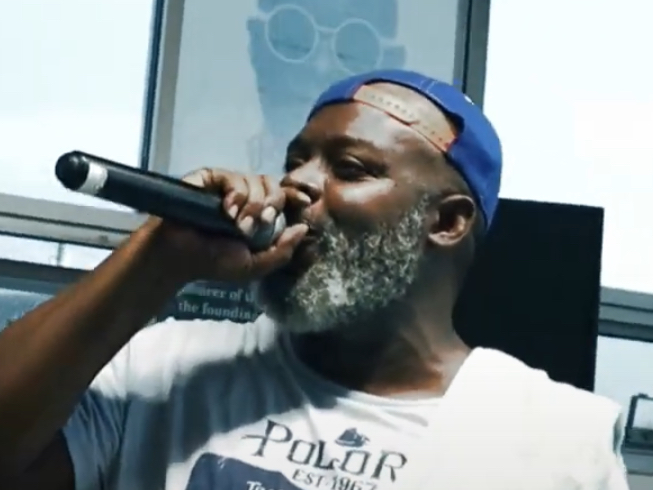
- Simpson performing for Detroit's 330th naissance, 2021

Background information
- Born: Byron Dwayne Simpson; Detroit, Michigan, U.S.
- Genres: Hip-hop
- Occupations: Rapper; songwriter
- Instrument: Vocals
- Years active: 1996-present
- Label: Stones Throw
- Member of: Almighty Dreadnaughtz

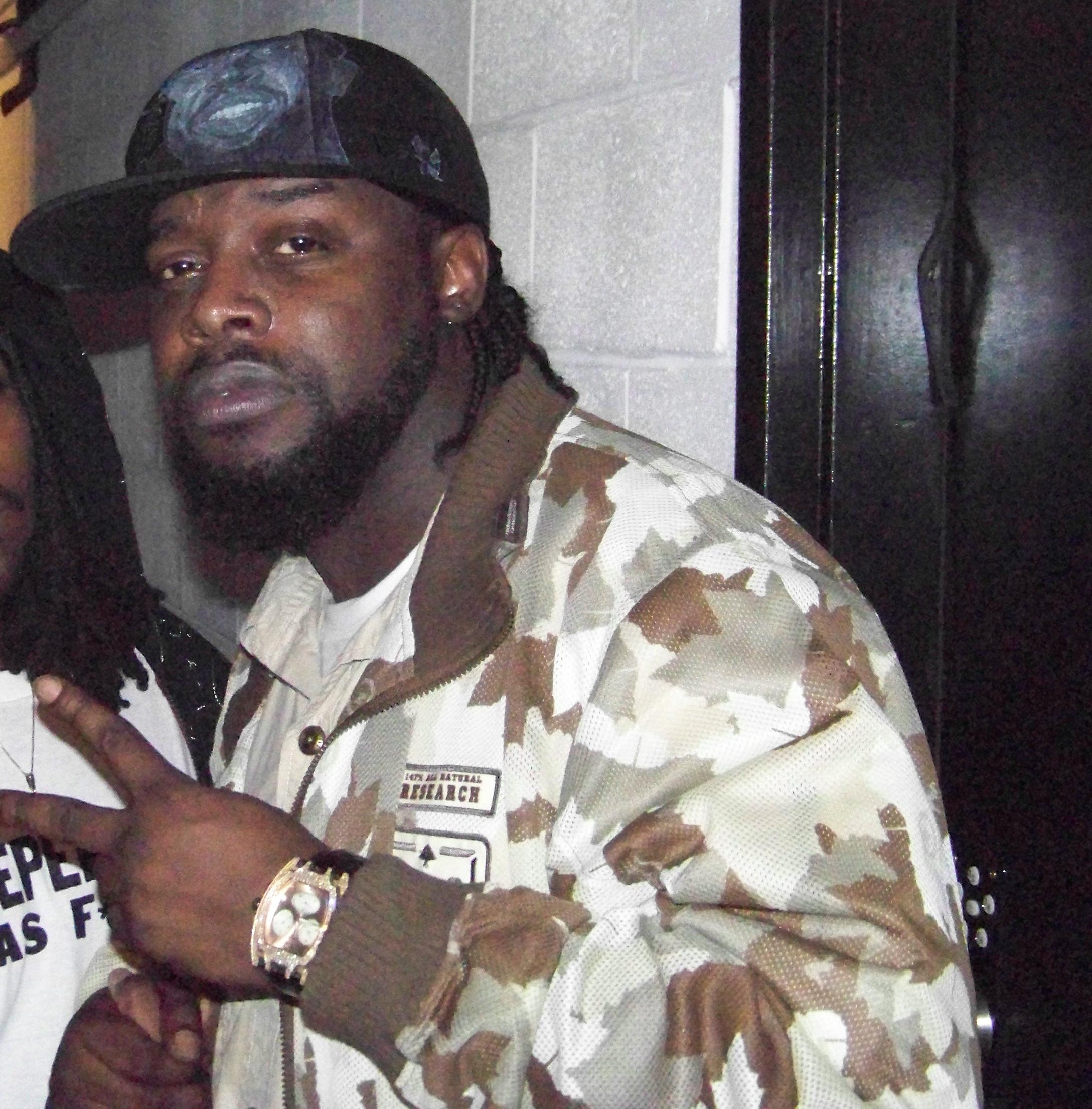
Simpson in 2008

Byron Dwayne "Guilty" Simpson is an American rapper and songwriter from Detroit, Michigan whose recording career spans more than 30 years. He is signed to Stones Throw Records, and is known for being one of the late producer J Dilla's favorite rappers.

Simpson's debut album, Ode to the Ghetto, includes production from J Dilla, as well as from Madlib and Black Milk; all three have been frequent collaborators of his. Along with Black Milk and the late Sean Price, Guilty Simpson formed one-third of the rap trio Random Axe. Simpson is also affiliated with the Detroit hip-hop collective Almighty Dreadnaughtz.

Guilty Simpson’s major rap influences are Big Daddy Kane, Scarface, Kool G Rap, and Ice Cube.

== Discography ==
=== Albums ===
Year	Title	Chart positions	
Year	Title	Top R&B/Hip-Hop Albums	Top Heatseekers
2008	Ode to the Ghetto: Released: March 25, 2008; Label: Stones Throw	69	23
2010	O. J. Simpson (produced by Madlib): Released: May 18, 2010; Label: Stones Throw	62	37
2015	Detroit's Son (produced by Katalyst of Quakers): Released: September 11, 2015; Label: Stones Throw	—	—
2021	EGO (produced by Gensu Dean): Released: October 8, 2021; Label: Mello Music Group	—	—
2023	Escalation (produced by Uncommon Nasa): Released: October 13, 2023; Label: Uncommon Records	—	—

=== Collaborations ===
Year	Title	Chart positions	
Year	Title	U.S. 200	U.S. R&B
2011	Random Axe with Black Milk & Sean Price: Released: June 14, 2011; Label: Duck Down	83	15
2012	The Mission EP with Eric Lau: Released: February 3, 2012; Label: Kilawatt Music	—	—
2012	Dice Game with Apollo Brown: Released: November 13, 2012; Label: Mello Music Group	—	—
2013	Highway Robbery with Small Professor: Released: September 24, 2013; Label: Beat Goliath/Coalmine	—	—
2014	The Simpson Tape with Oh No: Released: September 27, 2014; Label: Stones Throw	—	—
2019	Child Of The Jungle with MED: Released: March 29, 2019; Label: Bang Ya Head	?	?
2019	Sterling with Pendo Botha: Released: July 26, 2019; Label: Musikverein Rychenberg MVR	—	—
2020	LSD with Leonard Charles as the Leonard Simpson Duo: Released: January 31, 2020; Label: Jakarta	—	—

=== Mixtapes ===
- 2007: Stray Bullets (mixed by DJ Rhettmatic) (Stones Throw)
- 2009: Madlib Medicine Show Vol.1: Before the Verdict (Feat. Guilty Simpson) (produced by Madlib)
- 2010: Ghettodes (produced by Oh No)
- 2010: OX to the D (With Roc C) (produced by Soul Professa)

=== Singles ===
- 2007: "Man's World" 12" (Prod. J Dilla)
- 2007: "Getting Bitches" 12" (Prod. Mr Porter) b/w "She Won't Stay At Home" (Prod. Madlib)
- 2008: "Ode To The Ghetto" 12" (Prod. Oh No) b/w "Home Invazion (Madlib Robbery Remix)" (Prod. Madlib)
- 2008 "Guilt Trip" b/w "Trusted (Lying Bitch)" Digital Single (Prod. L.G.P)
- 2008: "Footwork (Size 12 Version)" 7" (Prod. Madlib)
- 2009: "Stress" 12" (Prod. J Dilla)
- 2009: "Coroners Music" 12" (Prod. Madlib) b/w "OJ Simpson" (Prod. Madlib)
- 2009: "Acquired Taste" 7" (Prod. Metro)
- 2013: "Gees" 7" (Prod. Musca)
- 2014: "Assam" 7" (Prod. Musca)

=== Appearances ===
2001

- "Cut Throat" (feat. Shi-Dog) by Paradime from Vices

2002

- "Dirty District Theme" (with MarvWon (billed as Guilty & Marv )) by Slum Village from Dirty District

2003

- "Strapped" by Jaylib from Champion Sound
- "As Serious As Your Life (J Dilla Remix)" by Four Tet from As Serious As Your Life 12"

2004

- "Dirtee Girlz" by Paradime from 11 Steps Down
- "Alert" by B.R. Gunna from Dirty District: Vol. 2

2006

- "Heartbreaker" by T3 from Olio: The Mixtape
- "Special" (feat. Paradime) by Dabrye from Two/Three
- "Baby" (feat. Madlib); "Jungle Love" (feat. M.E.D.) by J Dilla from The Shining
- "Clap Your Hands" (Peanut Butter Wolf – Chrome Children)

2007

- "Money Motivated Movements" by Peanut Butter Wolf from Chrome Children Vol. 2
- "Take Notice" by J Dilla from Ruff Draft
- "Nightmare" by Phat Kat from Carte Blanche
- "Watch Your Step" (feat. Vinnie Paz) by Percee P from Perseverance
- "Play Your Position" by Skyzoo from Corner Store Classic
- "For The D" (feat. Eric Lau) by Producer No. 1 from The Album
- "For The D (Harmonic 313 Remix)" (feat. Eric Lau) by Producer No. 1 from Remix EP
- "Supreme" (feat. Invincible) by Buff1 from Pure
- "Ruuude" (featuring Marv Won) by Paradime from Spill At Will
- "Sound The Alarm" by Black Milk from Popular Demand
- "Mouth Music" (feat. Busta Rhymes) by Black Milk & Bishop Lamont from Caltroit
- "Before I Die (Hip Hop Version)" (The Heliocentrics – Stones Throw Promo Sampler 2007
- "Make It Fast"; "Mash's Revenge" (feat. MF Doom) by Peanut Butter Wolf from 2K8 B-Ball Zombie War
- "Electric Gangstas" (feat. S.A., Tenacity, Shi-Dog) by Abolitionist Projects from Impossible Obstacle (Replacements)

2008

- "Rapcats Can't Fuck" (feat. Mr Smee) by DJ LKB & Miles Flint from Spezial Blend EP
- "Bad Man" feat. Scorpion by Fat Ray & Black Milk from The Set Up
- "Just LIKE A Man" by 88-Keys from Adam's Case Files: The Mixtape
- "Middle Of The Map Pt. 2" (feat. Black Milk) by Kidz In The Hall from The In Crowd
- "Can't Fuck With My City" by Trick-Trick from The People Vs.
- "Success" by Fatt Father from Fatt Father
- "Psycho (Guncheck)" by D3CCPT from Psycho (Guncheck) 12"
- "Strategies" by Shawn Jackson from First Of All...
- "Ferocious" by DJ Design from Jetlag
- "Do My Thing" (feat. Royce Da 5'9") by DJ Revolution from King Of The Decks
- "Oh X-Mas Tree" (feat. King Gordy & Phat Kat) by Fatt Father from Christmas With Fatt Father
- "Blow The Horns On 'Em"; "Go!" by Madlib from WLIB AM: King of the Wigflip
- "R U Listening" by Illa J from Yancey Boys
- "It Dont Stop"; "Unstoppable" by Dj Wich from The Golden Touch

2009

- "Speed", "Damn He Outcold" by Slautah & Alius Pnukkl from A.R.E.S. (A Red Eye Smokin')

2010

- "My Guitar Whales (Remix)" by Paul White from And The Purple Brain

2011

- "Dirty Slang", "Trust" by Paul White from Rapping With Paul White
- "Al Bundy" by Shim-E Bango from The Bridgecard EP
- "Maximum Karnage" by Slautah & Konphlict from He's The Producer, I'm The Emcee
- "My Eyes" by Moe Dirdee from Dirdee Motown 2
- "Champagne Wishes & Caviar Dreams", "Detroit 101" by Ro Spit from The Glass Ceiling Project

2012

- "Grime" (feat. Sean Price & Roc Marciano) by Fatt Father from Fatherhood
- "Crazy" & "Nails" by House Shoes from Let It Go

2013

- "PRX" (feat. Alchemist) by Quelle Chris from Ghost At The Finish Line

2014

- "Beef", "(The Regiment)" by Nick Speed from Live From The Coney Island
- "187" (feat. Ras Kass) by Diamond D from The Diam Piece

2015

- "Warning" by Denmark Vessey from Martin Lucid Dream

2018

- "Tunnel Vision" by Dabrye from Three/Three
- "Tha Basics" (feat. Chris Skillz) by Left Lane Didon & J.O.D from Back Doe Lil Joe

2020

- "Detroit to Kosovo" by Binakaj from The Menu
- "F*c'em" by Nuch & Tony Digz from Silver Alley EP
- "Feels Good to Say" with Suff Daddy from Pompette

2022

- ”We Gon’ Stomp Shit” (also featuring Tragedy Khadafi, Thirstin Howl III, Bonshah, Fraction & Ultra Magnus) by The Mighty Rhino from To Relieve The Sorrow-Laden Heart

== Personal life ==
Former NBA player Ronnie Brewer is a cousin of Guilty Simpson.
