= Phat Kat =

American rapper (born 1971)

- Born: Ronald Christopher Watts; August 26, 1971 (age 55)
- Origin: Detroit, Michigan, U.S.
- Genre: Hip hop
- Years active: 1993–present
- Label: Below System
- Formerly of: 1st Down

Ronald Christopher Watts (born August 26, 1971), better known by his stage name Phat Kat, is a rapper from Detroit, Michigan, best known as a favorite collaborator of the late J Dilla.

== Biography ==
His career began in the mid-1990s as part of 1st Down, which consisted of Phat Kat on vocals and J Dilla on production. The group was short lived however, possibly because of insufficient support/promotion from their label, Payday, but the two continued to collaborate on many occasions afterwards, starting with an appearance on "Fat Cat Song" and its remix, from Slum Village's Fan-Tas-Tic (Vol. 1).

In an interview, he spoke in regards to his time and music creations alongside Dilla, as well as the producer's work ethic:

Dilla didn’t fuck around in the studio. Everybody else had to adjust their style to keep up with Dilla, or if they ever wanted the chance to work with Dilla. You had to be able to knock out your verse in one take. I’ve seen Dilla make beats in 10 minutes. We made that track off of Welcome 2 Detroit in 10 minutes flat. We completed the whole Dedication To The Suckers EP from scratch in less than one night. He did the beats and I laid the verses. We started at 9 p.m. and finished by 12 midnight.

His first full-length album, The Undeniable LP, was released in 2003 on Barak Records. It featured appearances from Slum Village, Dwele and Obie Trice. Kat released a 12-inch single in late 2006 for the song "Cold Steel", produced by J Dilla, he then followed it with his second album, Carte Blanche, on April 24, 2007 on Look Records.

== Discography ==
=== Studio albums ===
- Dedication to the Suckers (1999) (with J Dilla)
- The Undeniable LP (2003)
- Carte Blanche (2007)
- The S.O.S. Project (2017) (with DJ Dister)

=== Guest appearances ===
- "Featuring Phat Kat" (from the J Dilla album Welcome 2 Detroit, 2001)
- "True Story" (from the B.R. Gunna album Dirty District Vol. 2, 2004)
- "Zoom" (from the Slum Village album Detroit Deli (A Taste of Detroit), 2004)
- "Hear This" (from the Slum Village album Slum Village, 2005)
- "Detroit Rapstar" (from the Lil Skeeter album Detroit Rapstar, 2005)
- "Lookatusnow" (from the Black Milk album Popular Demand, 2007)
- "Foulife" (from the Shotta album Sangre, 2008)
- "Keep It Real" with Elzhi and "Do It" (from the Cadik album Basic, 2008)
- "Oh X-Mas Tree" with King Gordy and Guilty Simpson (from the Fatt Father album Christmas with Fatt Father, 2008)
- "Success" with Guilty Simpson (from the Fatt Father self-titled album, 2008)
- "Raw Shit" with King Gordy and Seven the General (from the Fatt Father album Fatherhood, 2012)
- "Wanna Get to Know Ya" (from the Retrospective for Love album Random Activities of a Heart, 2017)
- "Secret Agents" with Guilty Simpson (from the your best friend jippy album Unidentified Friendly Object, 2024)
