= Almighty Dreadnaughtz =

American hip hop group

- Also known as: Tha Almighty Dreadnaughtz; The Almighty Dreadnaughts; The Almighty Drednaughts; Tha, Dreadnaughts; A.D.
- Origin: Detroit, Michigan, U.S.; Highland Park, Michigan, U.S.
- Genres: Underground hip hop
- Years active: 1986–present
- Label: DLP
- Members: Alius Pnukkl; Slautah; Konflict; Guilty Simpson; Supa Emcee; Kawshus; Hex Murda; Kriz Steel; Shi-Dog; D'Phuzion; Ed Sczrz; Cysion; Blitz; Krises; Kinio; Kutty Mack
- Website: MySpace

Almighty Dreadnaughtz is an American underground hip hop collective from Michigan, USA, founded in 1986 by Detroit-based rapper and producer Theron 'Alius Pnukkl' Ewing.

== History ==
The group was formed in 1986 by its first member Alius Pnukkl, and cited as a notable act of Detroit underground hip hop scene before Slum Village, The Dirty Dozen and Goon Sqwad. Participants of the crew were taking part in rap battles. The Almighty Dreadnaughtz are recognized among Eminem fan base due to a track "Desperados" by DJ Butter, which also features now-deceased D12 emcees Bugz and Proof. As well as Wu-Tang Clan, the group consists of a number of permanent members, as well as temporary members and / or its affiliates:

- Hex Murda (Hex, Hex Murdah, Hexmurda, born Eugene Howell) - Manager
- Alius Pnukkl (Alias P, born Theron Ewing) - MC/producer
- Slautah (Slautah Res, Slautah R.E.S.) - MC/producer
- Konphlict (Konnie Ross, Konflict, born Corey Wilson) - MC/producer
- Ed Sczrz (O1, Ed Sciz, 01) - MC/producer
- Cysion - MC/producer
- Supa Emcee (SUPA MC, Supaemcee, Super MC, Supremacee Brown, born Kent Brown) - MC
- Guilty Simpson (born Byron Simpson) - MC
- Kawshus (Kawshus Criminals) - MC
- Kriz Steel (Krizsteel) - MC
- Shi Dog - MC
- Blitz - Producer

In January 2024, Supa Emcee was arrested in Detroit on charges of murdering his wife.

== Solo actings ==
Guilty Simpson who joined the group in 1996 has reached the most successful individual career signing with Stones Throw Records; and also teamed up with Black Milk and Sean Price for Random Axe band, which was manager by Hexmurda. Hex and Supa Emcee (joined A.D. in 1994) were signees for Proof's Iron Fist Records, the label that stated the crew as honorable participants, along with the Fat Killahz. Alius, Slautah and Konphlict formed several duo projects between them, such as A.R.E.S. and released few studio albums. All the Almighty Dreadnaughtz members had appeared separately or together partially delivering rapping or production in many fellow Michigan underground hip hop acts, such as Miz Korona, Moe Dirdee, King Gordy, Fatt Father, DJ Los and more.

== Discography ==
- 1997 - Tha' Almighty Dreadnaughtz - City Of Trees
- 2000 - Tha Almighty Dreadnaughtz - Point Of No Return (self-released)
- 2003 - Almighty Dreadnaughtz - The Declaration Mixtape Secret Wars
- 2004 - The Almighty Dreadnaughtz - Land Of The Dreadnaughtz Mixtape
- 2008 - The Almighty Dreadnaughtz - You All Are Doomed
