= Black Milk =

American rapper and producer (born 1983)

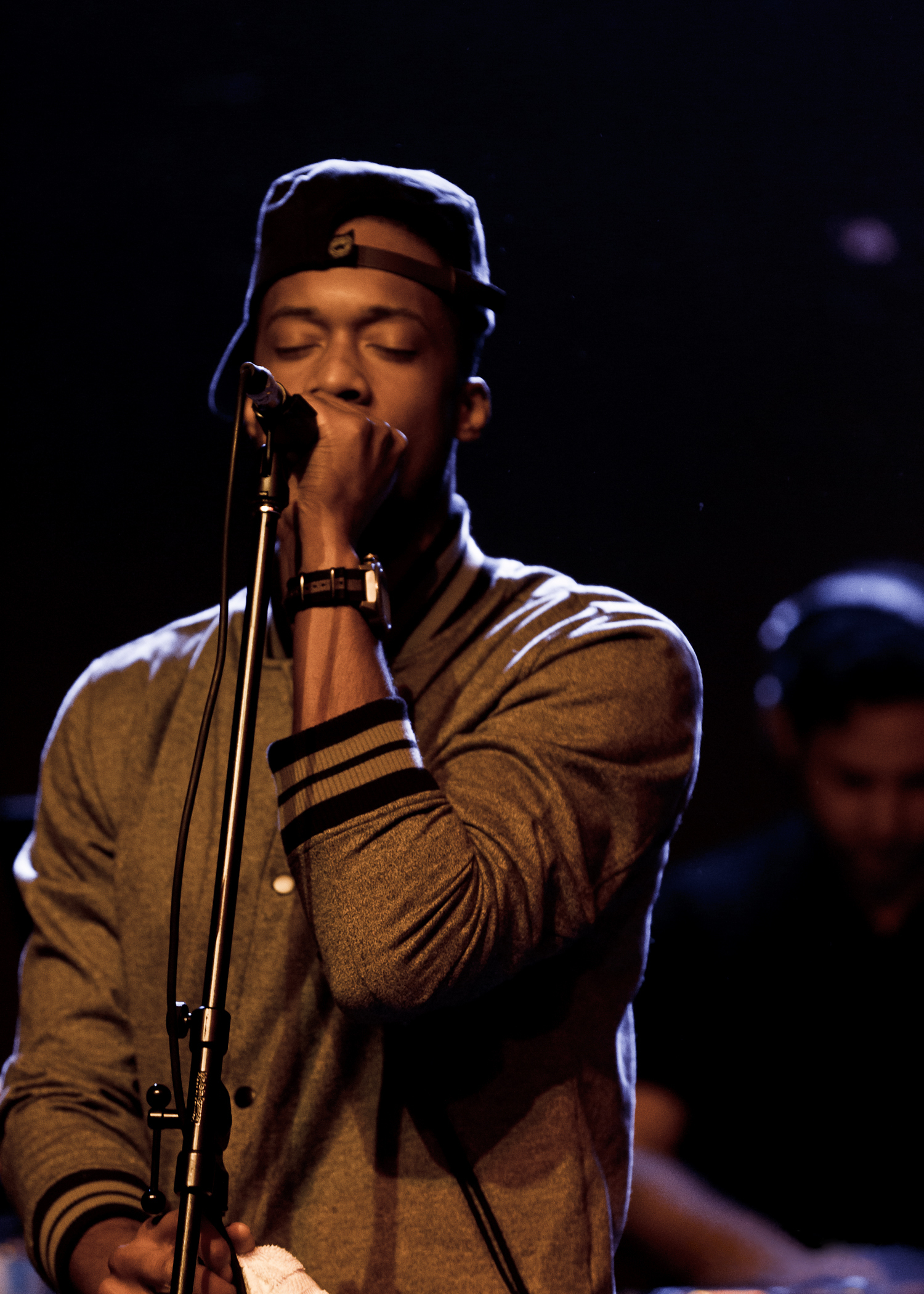
- Black Milk performing live in Toronto at The Great Hall, 2012

Background information
- Also known as: Nottyhead; B.R. Gunna
- Born: Curtis Eugene Cross; August 14, 1983 (age 42)
- Origin: Detroit, Michigan, United States
- Genres: Hip-hop; electronic; soul
- Occupations: Rapper; songwriter; record producer
- Instruments: Vocals; drums; turntable; sampler; keyboards; synthesizer; Rhodes piano; drum machine
- Years active: 2002–present
- Labels: Computer Ugly; Fat Beats; Third Man; Decon; Mass Appeal
- Website: www.instagram.com/black_milk

Curtis Eugene Cross (born August 14, 1983), better known by his stage name Black Milk, is an American rapper, songwriter, and record producer.

== Career ==
Black Milk has collaborated with J Dilla, Elzhi, Phat Kat, Frank-N-Dank, Lloyd Banks, Canibus, Pharoahe Monch, RZA, Slum Village, Danny Brown, Black Thought, T3 and many more throughout his career.

In 2004, Black Milk formed B.R. Gunna with Young RJ and Fat Ray. Together they released Dirty District: Vol. 2, a follow-up to a compilation released in 2001 by Slum Village, to which Black Milk had contributed production. In 2005, he released a solo album, Sound of the City, Vol. 1, signing a record contract with Fat Beats Records in 2006 (Fat Beats is currently distributed by Koch Entertainment, the largest independent distributor in the U.S.). In the fall of 2006, he released an EP, titled Broken Wax, and handled most of the production on T3's Olio mixtape. On March 13, 2007, he released his second album, Popular Demand.

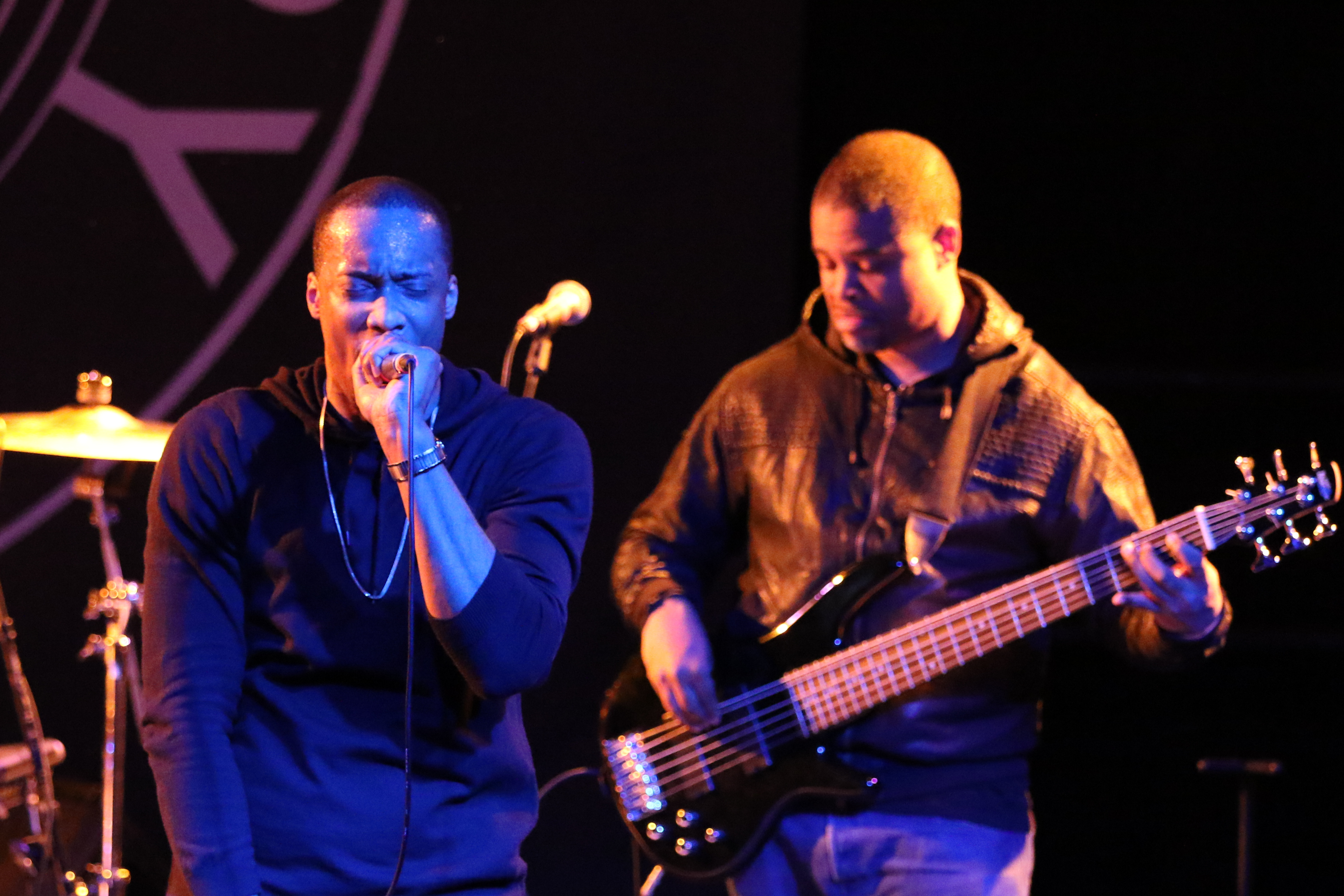
Black Milk at Treefort Music Fest in 2015

Black Milk released an album with Fat Ray entitled The Set Up on March 4, 2008, and his third official solo release "Tronic" on October 28, 2008. He also handled the majority of production on Elzhi's album The Preface, released August 12. (He also produced four of the tracks on Elzhi's "The Leftovers Unmixedtape" project, released on December 11, 2009.)

On December 25, 2009, Black Milk leaked the first single from his album Album of the Year. The song is called "Keep Going". He also released two more singles named "Welcome (Gotta Go)" and "Deadly Medley" featuring Royce da 5'9" and Elzhi. On August 22, 2010, he released the music video for "Deadly Medley", which also featured Royce da 5'9" and Elzhi. On September 14, he released Album of the Year through Fat Beats and Decon.

In March 2011, Black Milk released a 7" single entitled "Brain". The single was the result of a collaboration between Black Milk and his band (AB, Daru Jones and Malik Hunter) and Jack White of the White Stripes. A B-side, titled "Royal Mega", was also released.

On October 15, 2013, Black Milk released his a new album titled No Poison No Paradise, which included features from Black Thought of The Roots, Mel, Robert Glasper, Dwele, Quelle Chris, Ab and Tone Trezure, as well as additional production from Will Sessions.

On March 4, 2014, Black Milk released an entirely self-produced EP titled Glitches in the Break. The project consists of nine previously unreleased tracks and features guest appearances from Guilty Simpson and Fat Ray. A 12" vinyl edition of the EP was made available on Saturday, April 19.

On October 28, 2014, Black Milk released his sixth album titled If There's a Hell Below, features guest appearances by Blu, Bun B, Mel, Ab, Pete Rock, Gene Obey, and Random Axe.

== Discography ==
=== Studio albums ===
- Sound of the City (2005)
- Popular Demand (2007)
- Tronic (2008)
- Album of the Year (2010)
- No Poison No Paradise (2013)
- If There's a Hell Below (2014)
- Fever (2018)
- Everybody Good? (2023)
- CEREMONIAL (2026)

=== EPs ===
- Broken Wax (2006)
- Synth or Soul (2013)
- Glitches in the Break (2014)
- DiVE (2019)

=== Collaborative albums ===
- Dirty District Vol. 2 (with B.R. Gunna) (2004)
- Caltroit (with Bishop Lamont) (2008)
- The Set Up (with Fat Ray) (2008)
- Random Axe (with Sean Price and Guilty Simpson as Random Axe) (2011)
- Black & Brown! (with Danny Brown) (2011)
- Burning Stones (with Mel) (2013)
- The Rebellion Sessions (with Nat Turner) (2016)
- Sunday Outtakes (with Nat Turner) (2016)
- Food from the Gods (with Fat Ray) (2025)
