= Elzhi =

American rapper (born 1978)

eLZhi
- Also known as: eLZhi
- Born: Jason Powers; May 12, 1978 (age 48)
- Origin: Detroit, Michigan, US
- Genres: Midwestern hip-hop
- Occupations: Rapper; songwriter
- Years active: 1998–present
- Labels: Fat Beats; Jae B. Group; The JAE.B Group; Glow365
- Member of: Jericho Jackson
- Formerly of: Slum Village D12

Jason Powers (born May 12, 1978), better known by his stage name Elzhi (stylized as eLZhi), is an American rapper from Detroit, Michigan. He is a former member of Slum Village and now records as a solo artist. In his youth, he made numerous visits to the Hip-Hop shop in Detroit, taking advantage of open-mic nights hosted by fellow Detroit rapper Proof.

== Biography ==
=== Out of Focus ===
In 1998, Elzhi recorded a number of songs with Detroit hip-hop artist DJ Houseshoes with DJ Rios. These recording sessions yielded material that would become the Out of Focus EP, but the project was abandoned due to personal obligations and a lack of distribution options in Detroit. During the mixing process, DJ Houseshoes passed the DATs onto Dilla, who intended on remixing the whole album before his passing.

In late 2000, Elzhi acquired Dilla's master tapes and provided his close friends with CD's of the Out of Focus EP, plus 3 extra tracks. With a few CD's out in the open, the EP eventually leaked onto the Internet under the name "Unreleased Solo Project", but many CD's sold or distributed under this title are mislabeled with inaccurate track-listings and credits. The project was re-released in 2011 on his official website with a 27-minute bonus track showcasing verses from past features.

Dilla asked Elzhi to take his place in the group Slum Village because he believed in Elzhi's gift and Dilla was battling Lupus.

=== 925, Waajeed, and Jay Dee ===
In 1999, Elzhi became affiliated with the 9-2-5 Colony, a group formed by Nick Speed and Magestik Legend. The trio of emcees recorded only a few songs together: "Gun Talk", "Oh Shit" and "Farewell". In "Farewell", produced by Lacks, each emcee spits a verse about their relationships with women. Elzhi uses a verse he had originally recorded for the DJ Houseshoes-produced "What I Am", a discarded song from the Out of Focus sessions. "Farewell", like the rest of the 9-2-5 material, remains incomplete and unreleased.

In 2000, Elzhi began extensive collaboration with Waajeed, and the pair created an untold number of songs. "Stunted Growth" is one of the few tracks to ever emerge from this era of recording.

As Elzhi and Waajeed became closer, so did El's affiliation with Slum Village. Constantly working on his music, Elzhi had the opportunity to record songs over some of Jay Dee's unused beats (e.g. "Days and Nights Analyzin'" and "Concrete Eyes") and attracted the attention of Slum Village member T3, who took the young artist under his wing, bringing Elzhi to the attention of Jay Dee. This connection paved the way for Elzhi's national debut on Jay Dee's Welcome to Detroit album, for which he received his first ever pay check in the rap game. Elzhi's verse on the song "Come Get It" was acclaimed by Hiphopsite.com upon its release.

=== Slum Village ===
In 2002, with Jay Dee no longer an official member, Slum Village began recording their follow up to Trinity. During the sessions, T3 invited Elzhi to collaborate on a few tracks. One of the earliest of these was the "Aerodynamic Remix" by Daft Punk, which was featured on the Kiss of the Dragon soundtrack. Originally, Slum Village intended Elzhi's presence on the album to be nothing more than a featured guest. But, recognizing their chemistry, Baatin and T3 invited Elzhi to become a full-time member, a choice enthusiastically supported by J Dilla. In July 2010, Elzhi officially announced his departure from Slum Village.

=== Libido Sounds ===
In 2004, Elzhi and Nick Speed formed the Libido Sounds label in order to release Witness My Growth, a double CD compilation of Elzhi's unreleased solo material from as early as 1997. The double disc includes exclusive J Dilla collaborations, as well as highlights from the Out of Focus EP. Production credits on the mixtape include J Dilla, Waajeed, Karriem Riggins, Page Kennedy, B.R. Gunna, DJ Magnetic, Houseshoes and The Alchemist.

His first solo project with national distribution, The Preface, was released on August 12, 2008.

=== Elmatic ===
On May 10, 2011, Elzhi released a mixtape as an homage to Nas's debut album Illmatic, with Will Sessions recreating the sounds of the iconic album. The mixtape was greatly received by hip hop fans and considered one of the best projects released in 2011. He has released three videos for the mixtape, "Halftime", "Memory Lane", and "It Ain't Hard to Tell", which has hit 1 million views despite not being backed by a major record label.

=== Lead Poison ===
In November 2013, Elzhi successfully raised over $37,000 for a Kickstarter project designed to facilitate the creation and release of his next studio album. Following an extended delay, Elzhi announced in January 2016 that his new album Lead Poison was officially completed. Lead Poison was released on March 11, 2016.

=== Jericho Jackson ===
On December 31, 2017, 9th Wonder posted a snippet of new music on his Instagram, revealing that Elzhi and Jamla producer Khrysis were working on a project under the name Jericho Jackson, named after the character in the film Action Jackson. The project was finally announced on February 9 as Elzhi & Khrysis are Jericho Jackson, releasing the single "Self Made" along with this information. The second single "Listen" featuring Amber Navran of neo soul band Moonchild, was premiered by Billboard on February 20. The album was released February 23, with Elzhi primarily on vocals, and Khrysis entirely producing the album.

== Discography ==
=== Solo albums ===
- 2008: The Preface
- 2016: Lead Poison
- 2020: Seven Times Down Eight Times Up

=== With Slum Village ===
- 2002: Trinity (Past, Present and Future)
- 2004: Detroit Deli (A Taste of Detroit)
- 2005: Slum Village
- 2009: Villa Manifesto EP
- 2010: Villa Manifesto

=== Extended plays (EPs) ===
- 1998: Out of Focus
- 2000: The Breakfast Club (with Dwele, Lacks, Big Tone & 87)
- 2010: Out of Focus EP (re-release with 20 min bonus track)

=== Mixtapes ===
- 2004: Witness My Growth: The Mixtape 97-04
- 2005: Prequel To A Classic (with Slum Village)
- 2008: EuroPass: An Exclusive Tour CD (Tour CD)
- 2009: The Leftovers (Unmixedtape)
- 2011: Elmatic

=== Collaborative albums ===
- 2018: Elzhi & Khrysis are Jericho Jackson (with Khrysis as Jericho Jackson)
- 2022: Zhigeist (with Georgia Anne Muldrow)
- 2023: Heavy Vibrato (with Oh No)
