= Bizarre discography =

American rapper Bizarre's discography

Bizarre, an American rapper and member of D12, has released eight solo studio albums and one extended play.

== Studio albums ==
Title	Album details	Peak chart positions					Sales
Title	Album details	US 200	US R&B	AUS	FRA	UK	Sales
Hannicap Circus	Released: June 28, 2005; Label: Sanctuary (75352, 87535); Format: CD, MD, LP	48	26	67	184	43	US: 200,000
Blue Cheese & Coney Island	Released: October 9, 2007; Label: KR Urban (5592); Format: CD, MD	—	—	—	—	—	US:129,000
Friday Night at St. Andrews	Released: May 18, 2010; Label: AVJ Records; Format: CD, MD	—	—	—	—	—	US:215,000
Rufus	Released: December 10, 2019; Label: No Money Records; Format: CD, MD	—	—	—	—	—	
Peter	Released: December 19, 2021; Label: No Money Records; Format: MD	—	—	—	—	—	
He Got a Gun	Released: June 3, 2022; Label: Middle Finger Music; Format: MD	—	—	—	—	—	
18159 Stout	Released: February 23, 2023; Label: No Money Records; Format: MD	—	—	—	—	—	
HGG2	Released: June 14, 2023; Label: Middle Finger Music; Format: MD	—	—	—	—	—	
"—" denotes releases that did not chart or receive certification. | "*" denotes album has not yet been released.

== Extended plays ==
Title	Album details
Attack of the Weirdos	Released: September 1, 1998; Label: Federation; Format: CD, CS

=== Mixtapes ===
List of mixtapes, with selected information
Title	Album details
This Guy's a Weirdo	Released: March 30, 2012; Formats: Digital download
Lace Blunts	Released: May 30, 2013; Formats: Digital download
Lace Blunts 2	Released: March 2, 2014; Formats: Digital download
Dab Life	Released: January 17, 2015; Formats: Digital download, CD

== Singles ==
Year	Title	Peak chart positions					Album
Year	Title	AUS	GER	NLD	NZ	UK	Album
2005	"Rockstar"	50	93	18	35	17	Hannicap Circus
2007	"Fat Boy" (featuring King Gordy)	—	—	—	—	—	Blue Cheese & Coney Island
2007	"So Hard" (featuring Monica Blair)	—	—	—	—	—	Blue Cheese & Coney Island
2010	"Believer" (featuring Tech N9ne & Nate Walka)	—	—	—	—	—	Friday Night at St. Andrews
2010	"Rap's Finest" (featuring Kuniva, Seven the General & Royce da 5'9")	—	—	—	—	—	Friday Night at St. Andrews
2014	"Pray 4 Me"	—	—	—	—	—	Non-album single
"—" denotes releases that did not chart or receive certification.

== Guest appearances ==
List of non-single guest appearances, with other performing artists, showing year released and album name
Title	Year	Other artist(s)	Album
"No One's Iller"	1997	Eminem, Swifty, Fuzz Scoota	Slim Shady EP
"Clash of tha Titans"	1999	Paradime, Bugz, DJ Invincible, S.U.N.	Paragraphs
"Get Back"	2000	Tony Touch, Proof, Eminem	The Piece Maker
"Words Are Weapons"	2000	Funkmaster Flex, D12	The Mix Tape, Vol. IV
"Act a Fool"	2000	DJ Butter, Bugz, Proof	Kill the DJ
"Amityville"	2000	Eminem	The Marshall Mathers LP
"Under the Influence"	2000	D12	The Marshall Mathers LP
"Blow My Buzz"	2001	D12	The Wash and Devil's Night
"When the Music Stops"	2002	D12	The Eminem Show
"911"	2002	Gorillaz, D12, Terry Hall	Bad Company
"She Devil"	2002	Tech N9NE, D12	Absolute Power
"Rap Game"	2002	D12, 50 Cent	8 Mile
"Creep Show"	2003	Killer Mike	Monster
"Time to Die"	2003	King Gordy	The Entity
"Outro"	2003	Obie Trice, D12	Cheers
"Census Bureau"	2004	DJ Kay Slay, D12	The Streetsweeper, Vol. 2: The Pain from the Game
"Drop Me in the Middle"	2004	Natasha Bedingfield	Unwritten
"Lies & Rumors"	2004	D12	Shark Tale
"One Shot 2 Shot"	2004	D12	Ǝncore
"Throw It Up"	2005	D12	Crime Life: Gang Wars
"My Ballz"	2005	D12	The Longest Yard
"Pimplikeness"	2005	D12	Searching for Jerry Garcia
"Real TV"	2005	Hush	Bulletproof
"Murder"	2006	Kuniva	Eminem Presents: The Re-Up
"Squeeze Dat"	2007	King Gordy	Van Dyke and Harper Music
"Cobainiac"	2007	King Gordy	Cobain's Diary
"Psycho, Psycho, Psycho!"	2008	Prozak, King Gordy	Tales from the Sick
"Dear Mother"	2010	King Gordy, Prozak, Kehoa	Xerxes is the God-King
"No Regrets"	2010	Dark Half, King Gordy	Chapterz
"Weird in Bed"	2010	Sodoma Gomora	Na Konci Tunelu Je Tma
"Hit Me With Your Best Shot"	2011	D12	Relapse 2 Unreleased and Straight from the Lab Part 2
"Sleepless"	2012	Danny Diablo	The Blood of Eden
"The Rapture"	2012	Snowgoons, Meth Mouth, Sean Strange, Swifty McVay, King Gordy	Snowgoons Dynasty
"Sadistentreff II"	2012	Crystal F, Timi Hendrix, King Gordy	X
"In Yo Behind"	2014	Struggle Da Preacher, Blaze Stack Up	Ups'n'Downs
"Bane"	2014	D12	Shady XV
"Never Sober"	2015	Bag of Tricks Cat, Justus	Cat's out the Bag
"Jerry Springer"	2016	Fury, King Gordy	One of 12
"Ric Flair"	2016	Fury, The Real Chaos	One of 12
"On My Own"	2017	Calm Ron Ali	Dark Places
"Cold Soul"	2017	Gorilla Voltage	Ape-X
"Pimps & Hoes"	2017	Swifty McVay	Grey Blood
"Twentyone"	2018	Locreance	Locreance
"Katana Blades"	2018	Enels	—N/a
"General Managing"	2018	Kool Keith	Controller of Trap
"Where Da Hoes At?"	2019	King Killumbia, Project Pat	King Killumbia
"Detroit 2 Memphis"	2019	Kingpin Skinny Pimp, Mexiveli	Undefined
"All Night"	2019	King Killumbia, MET G	MET Geezus
"Antichrist"	2024	Eminem	The Death of Slim Shady (Coup de Grâce)
"Best 4 Last"	2024	Jae 84	16 Seasons
