= Mr. Porter production discography =

Mr. Porter production discography contains all works associated with the American rapper and producer Denaun Porter, known as Mr. Porter.

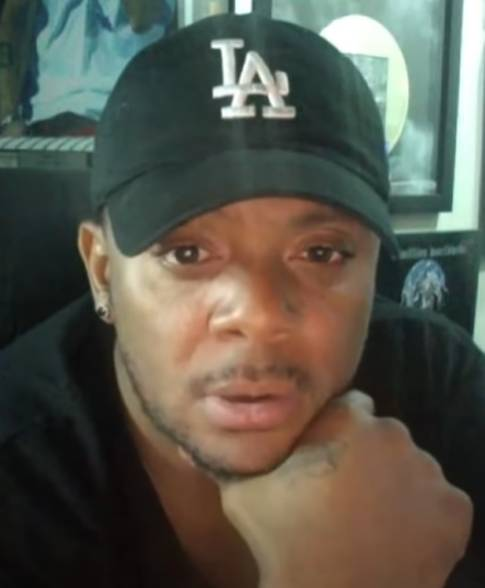
Mr. Porter in 2018

List of songs produced by Mr. Porter, with performing artists, showing year released and album name
| Title | Year | Performer(s) | Album | |
|---|---|---|---|---|
| "6 Reasons" | 1996 | D12 | The Underground EP | |
| "Derelict Theme" | 1996 | D12 | The Underground EP | |
| "Chance To Advance" | 1996 | D12 | The Underground EP | |
| "Bring Our Boys" | 1996 | D12 | The Underground EP | |
| "Bad News" | 1996 | D12 | The Underground EP | |
| "Infinite" | 1996 | Eminem | Infinite | |
| "W.E.G.O. (Interlude)" | 1996 | Proof, DJ Head | Infinite | |
| "It's O.K." | 1996 | Eminem, Eye-Kyu | Infinite | |
| "Tonite" | 1996 | Eminem | Infinite | |
| "313" | 1996 | Eminem, Eye-Kyu | Infinite | |
| "Maxine" | 1996 | Eminem, Mr. Porter, Three | Infinite | |
| "Open Mic" | 1996 | Eminem, Thyme | Infinite | |
| "Never 2 Far" | 1996 | Eminem | Infinite | |
| "Searchin'" | 1996 | Eminem, EyeKyu, Mr. Porter, Angela Workman | Infinite | |
| "Backstabber" | 1996 | Eminem | Infinite | |
| "Jealousy Woes II" | 1996 | Eminem | Infinite | |
| "Low Down, Dirty" (with Kuniva as Da Brigade) | 1997 | Eminem | Slim Shady EP | |
| "Just Don't Give a Fuck" (radio edit) | 1997 | Eminem | Slim Shady EP | |
| "What What" | 1998 | Bizarre | Attack of the Weirdos | |
| "High" | 1999 | D12 | —N/a | |
| "Shit Can Happen" | 2001 | D12 | Devil's Night | |
| "Pistol Pistol"^{[a]} | 2001 | D12 | Devil's Night | |
| "That's How..." | 2001 | D12 | Devil's Night | |
| "Obie Trice" (skit) | 2001 | D12 | Devil's Night | |
| "State to State" | 2001 | Outsidaz | The Bricks | |
| "Rap Game" (produced with Eminem) | 2002 | D12, 50 Cent | 8 Mile | |
| "Spit Shine" | 2002 | Xzibit | 8 Mile | |
| "R.A.K.I.M." | 2002 | Rakim | 8 Mile | |
| "Riot" | 2002 | Busta Rhymes | It Ain't Safe No More | |
| "When the Music Stops" (produced with Eminem) | 2002 | D12 | The Eminem Show | |
| "The Seance" | 2002 | Ras Kass | Goldyn Chyld | |
| "Multiply" | 2002 | Xzibit, Nate Dogg | Man vs. Machine | |
| "Stunt 101" | 2003 | G-Unit | Beg for Mercy | |
| "Spread Yo Shit" | 2003 | Obie Trice, Mr. Porter | Cheers | |
| "Bend a Corner" | 2003 | Ras Kass, Mr. Porter | Re-Up | |
| "P.I.M.P." | 2003 | 50 Cent | Get Rich or Die Tryin' | |
| "P.I.M.P." (remix) | 2003 | 50 Cent, Snoop Dogg, Lloyd Banks, Young Buck | Get Rich or Die Tryin' | |
| "I'll Be Damned" | 2004 | D12 | D12 World | |
| "U R the One" | 2004 | D12 | D12 World | |
| "Commercial Break" | 2004 | D12, Young Zee | D12 World | |
| "Good Die Young" | 2004 | D12 | D12 World | |
| "Barbershop" | 2004 | D12 | D12 World Bonus Disc / BarberShop 2: Back in Business Soundtrack | |
| "You Know How 2" | 2004 | Proof, Famous | I Miss the Hip Hop Shop | |
| "94" | 2004 | Rohff | La Fierté Des Nôtres | |
| "B.N.U." | 2004 | D12 | DJ Slam Wreck - Welcome to the Pyrex / My Band | |
| "Lies & Rumours" | 2004 | D12 | Shark Tale: Motion Picture Soundtrack | |
| "Look at Me Now" | 2004 | Young Buck, Mr. Porter | Straight Outta Cashville | |
| "We Some Dogs" | 2004 | Method Man, Mr. Porter, Redman, Snoop Dogg | Tical 0: The Prequel | |
| "Crooked Letter I" | 2004 | Method Man, Streetlife, Mr. Porter | Tical 0: The Prequel | |
| "Ride or Die" | 2004 | Xzibit, Mitchy Slick, Tone | Weapons of Mass Destruction | |
| "Promise I" | 2004 | Snoop Dogg | R&G (Rhythm & Gangsta): The Masterpiece | |
| "Census Bureau" | 2004 | D12 | The Streetsweeper, Vol. 2 | |
| "C'Mon" (produced with J.R. Rotem) | 2004 | Jin | The Rest Is History | |
| "Sting Bling" | 2005 | Proof | Grown Man Shit | |
| "Live N Direct" | 2005 | Proof | Grown Man Shit | |
| "She's a Pro" | 2005 | Black Rob, Mr. Porter | The Black Rob Report | |
| "Slippin'" | 2005 | Lil' Kim | The Naked Truth | |
| "Stay Bout It" | 2005 | Obie Trice, Stat Quo | Anger Management 3 | |
| "Onions for Sale" | 2005 | Runyon Ave. Soldiers, Mr. Porter, Young Who | Anger Management 3 | |
| "Tonight's the Night" | 2005 | Cuban Link | Chain Reaction | |
| "Fuck Your Life" | 2005 | Bizarre, Sindee Syringe | Hannicap Circus | |
| "Porno Bitches" | 2005 | Bizarre, Devin the Dude, Big Boi, Mr. Porter | Hannicap Circus | |
| "Nuthin' at All" | 2005 | D12 | Hannicap Circus | |
| "Slum Elementz" | 2005 | Proof, Mr. Porter, T3, Mudd | Searching for Jerry Garcia | |
| "They're Out to Get Me" | 2006 | Busta Rhymes, Mr. Porter | The Big Bang | |
| "Let's Ride" | 2006 | Method Man, Ginuwine | 4:21... The Day After | |
| "Get Back" | 2006 | Monica Blaire, Mr. Porter | Portraits of Me | |
| "Beat Up on Yo Pads" | 2006 | Snoop Dogg | Tha Blue Carpet Treatment | |
| "Around the World" | 2006 | Game, Jamie Foxx | Doctor's Advocate | |
| "City of Struggle (D-Town)" | 2007 | Lil Skeeter | Midwest Mastermind | |
| "When the Gun Draws" | 2007 | Pharoahe Monch, Mr. Porter | Desire | |
| "The Trilogy" | 2007 | Pharoahe Monch, Mr. Porter, Dwele, Tone Trezure | Desire | |
| "Get Ya Paper" | 2007 | Soopafly, Daz Dillinger | Bangin Westcoast | |
| "Say It Again" | 2007 | Soopafly | Bangin Westcoast | |
| "Paranoid" | 2007 | WC, Ice Cube | Guilty by Affiliation | |
| "ExtraHard" | 2007 | Little Brother | Getback | |
| "System" (UK/Japan bonus track) | 2007 | Little Brother, Tone Trezure | Getback | |
| "Paper Chaser" | 2007 | Playaz Circle, Phonte of Little Brother | Supply & Demand | |
| "Beneath the Diamonds" | 2007 | DJ Drama, Devin the Dude, Twista, La the Darkman and Mr. Porter | Gangsta Grillz: The Album | |
| "I Go" | 2007 | Buff1 | Pure | |
| "Heaven" | 2007 | Bishop Lamont | Pope Mobile | |
| "Robbery" | 2008 | Guilty Simpson | Ode to the Ghetto | |
| "Getting Bitches" | 2008 | Guilty Simpson | Ode to the Ghetto | |
| "Kinda Live" | 2008 | Guilty Simpson | Ode to the Ghetto | |
| "We Deep" | 2008 | Royce da 5'9" | The Bar Exam 2 | |
| "Fantastic" | 2008 | Above Ave. | Mission | |
| "Do It For You (More)" | 2008 | Above Ave. | Mission | |
| "I Won't Lose" | 2008 | Above Ave. | Mission | |
| "Us Rise" | 2008 | Above Ave. | Mission | |
| "S.F.'s Finest (Fire!)" | 2008 | Above Ave., DJ Twelvz, San Quinn | Mission | |
| "The Greatest Trick" (produced with Dr. Dre) | 2008 | Bishop Lamont | The Confessional | |
| "Juggernauts" | 2008 | Black Milk & Bishop Lamont | Caltroit | |
| "Get 'Em" | 2008 | Mr. Porter, Guilty Simpson, Nu World Hustle | DJ Slam Wreck - Trouble Soon | |
| "Thur the Hood" | 2008 | Guilty Simpson | DJ Slam Wreck - Trouble Soon | |
| "It's About to Go Down" | 2008 | Shim-E-Bango | DJ Slam Wreck - Trouble Soon | |
| "Hands High" | 2008 | Da Brigade | DJ Slam Wreck - Trouble Soon | |
| "Smoking Gun" | 2009 | Jadakiss, Jazmine Sullivan | The Last Kiss | |
| "Decision" | 2009 | Busta Rhymes, Jamie Foxx, Mary J. Blige, John Legend, Common | Back on My B.S. | |
| "Salute" | 2009 | Slaughterhouse, Pharoahe Monch | Slaughterhouse | |
| "Cut You Loose" | 2009 | Slaughterhouse | Slaughterhouse | |
| "Get Off My Ass" | 2009 | The Fam | Family Business | |
| "Mine in Thiz" | 2009 | Royce da 5'9", Mr. Porter | Street Hop | |
| "Thing for Your Girlfriend" | 2009 | Royce da 5'9", K-Young | Street Hop | |
| "I'm Fresh" | 2009 | Royce da 5'9", Mr. Porter | Street Hop deluxe edition | |
| "My Own Planet" | 2009 | Royce da 5'9", Big Sean | Street Hop deluxe edition | |
| "What Up" | 2009 | Marv Won | Way of the Won | |
| "Thin Ice" | 2009 | Marv Won | Way of the Won | |
| "Need To Know" | 2009 | Marv Won, Bilal | Way of the Won | |
| "7 Days 6 Nights" | 2009 | The Lox, T.Y. | D-Block Presents: Prepare for Glory | |
| "On Fire" | 2010 | Eminem | Recovery | |
| "Nut Up" | 2010 | Eminem | Relapse 2 (Throwaway) | |
| "Diamonds and Gold" | 2010 | Kuniva, Mr. Porter | Retribution | |
| "Hurry Up and Buy" | 2010 | Kuniva | Retribution | |
| "Die Young" | 2010 | Kuniva | Retribution | |
| "Clyde The Glyde" | 2010 | Kuniva | Retribution | |
| "Where The Heart Is" | 2010 | Kuniva | Retribution | |
| "Thug Luv" (produced with Statiq) | 2010 | DJ Kayslay, Maino, Papoose, Red Café, Ray J | More Than Just a DJ | |
| "I Fear's No One" | 2010 | Tha Dogg Pound | 100 Wayz | |
| "I Just Want to Fuck" | 2011 | Game, Kurupt | Purp & Patron | |
| "Sun Doobie" | 2011 | Slaughterhouse | Slaughterhouse | |
| "My Own Way" | 2011 | Snoop Dogg, Mr. Porter | Doggumentary | |
| "We Rest In Cali" | 2011 | Snoop Dogg, Goldie Loc, Bootsy Collins | Doggumentary | |
| "Let's Go" | 2011 | D12 | Return of the Dozen Vol. 2 | |
| "Fuck in the Trunk" | 2011 | D12 | Return of the Dozen Vol. 2 | |
| "Let My People Go"^{[a]} | 2011 | Pharoahe Monch | W.A.R. (We Are Renegades) | |
| "The Hitman"^{[a]} | 2011 | Pharoahe Monch | W.A.R. (We Are Renegades) | |
| "Furiously Dangerous" | 2011 | Ludacris, Slaughterhouse, Claret Jai | Fast Five | |
| "Above the Law" | 2011 | Bad Meets Evil | Hell: The Sequel | |
| "I'm on Everything" | 2011 | Bad Meets Evil, Mike Epps | Hell: The Sequel | |
| "Take from Me" | 2011 | Bad Meets Evil | Hell: The Sequel | |
| "Loud Noises" | 2011 | Bad Meets Evil, Slaughterhouse | Hell: The Sequel | |
| "Living Proof" | 2011 | Bad Meets Evil | Hell: The Sequel | |
| "Security" | 2011 | Royce da 5'9" | Success Is Certain | |
| "My Own Planet" | 2011 | Royce da 5'9", Joe Budden, Mr. Porter | Success Is Certain | |
| "I've Been Up, I've Been Down" | 2011 | Royce da 5'9" | Success Is Certain | |
| "Rock That" | 2011 | Royce da 5'9", Kid Vishis | Success Is Certain | |
| "Talking Reckless" | 2011 | Eric Roberson | Mister Nice Guy | |
| "Throw It Away" | 2012 | Slaughterhouse, Swizz Beatz | Welcome to: Our House | |
| "Die" | 2012 | Slaughterhouse | Welcome to: Our House | |
| "Love-Hate" | 2012 | Busta Rhymes, Robin Thicke | Year of the Dragon | |
| "Winner's Circle" | 2012 | Marv Won, Royce Da 5'9" | Heavy Is The Head... | |
| "Got To Go" | 2012 | Marv Won | Heavy Is The Head... | |
| "Goose Down" | 2012 | Marv Won, Mr. Porter | Heavy Is The Head... | |
| "Still The Same"^{[b]} (co-production with Trox) | 2012 | Marv Won, Young Roc | Heavy Is The Head... | |
| "Lonely Thoughts" | 2013 | Rapsody, Chance The Rapper | She Got Game | |
| "Crook N Porter" | 2013 | Crooked I | Apex Predator | |
| "Gangstas Don't Live That Long" | 2014 | Snoop Dogg | That's My Work Vol. 3 | |
| "Bane" (co-produced by Marv Won) | 2014 | D12 | Shady XV | |
| "GMA (The Speech)" | 2015 | Obie Trice | The Hangover | |
| "Steel Ill" | 2015 | D12 | The Devil's Night Mixtape | |
| "I'm Killin It" | 2015 | D12, Royce da 5'9" | The Devil's Night Mixtape | |
| "Champagne & Cummerbunds" | 2015 | Ro Spit | IV Life... | |
| "This Corner"^{[a]} | 2015 | Mr. Porter | Southpaw (Music from and Inspired by the Motion Picture) | |
| "Crown" | 2016 | Torae, 3D Na'Tee | Entitled | |
| "Mind Right Interlude" | 2016 | Royce da 5'9", Kid Vishis | Tabernacle: Trust the Shooter | |
| "Digest" | 2016 | Royce da 5'9", Tiara | Tabernacle: Trust the Shooter | |
| "Pray" | 2016 | Royce da 5'9" | Layers | |
| "Startercoat" | 2016 | Royce da 5'9" | Layers | |
| "Layers" | 2016 | Royce da 5'9", Pusha T, Rick Ross | Layers | |
| "Quiet" | 2016 | Royce da 5'9", Tiara, Mr. Porter | Layers | |
| "Off" | 2016 | Royce da 5'9" | Layers | |
| "Anywhere" | 2016 | Tech N9ne, Marsha Ambrosius | The Storm | |
| "Believe" | 2017 | Eminem | Revival | |
| "Chloraseptic" | 2017 | Eminem, Phresher | Revival | |
| "Untouchable" | 2017 | Eminem | Revival | |
| "Chloraseptic" (remix) | 2017 | Eminem, Phresher, 2 Chainz | —N/a | |
| "I Believe I Can Fly" | 2018 | L.A.R.S. | Last American Rock Stars | |
| "Fresh Out!" | 2018 | Tech N9ne, Swisher Sleep | Planet | |
| "My Parallel" (skit) | 2018 | Royce da 5'9" | Book of Ryan | |
| "Godspeed" | 2018 | Royce da 5'9", Ashley Sorrell | Book of Ryan | |
| "Who Are You" (skit) | 2018 | Royce da 5'9" | Book of Ryan | |
| "Legendary" | 2018 | Royce da 5'9" | Book of Ryan | |
| "Outside" | 2018 | Royce da 5'9", Marsha Ambrosius, Robert Glasper | Book of Ryan | |
| "Protecting Ryan" (skit) | 2018 | Royce da 5'9" | Book of Ryan | |
| "Strong Friend" | 2018 | Royce da 5'9" | Book of Ryan | |
| "Anything/Everything" | 2018 | Royce da 5'9" | Book of Ryan | |
| "Yah Yah" | 2020 | Eminem, Royce da 5'9", Black Thought, Q-Tip, Denaun | Music to Be Murdered By | |
| "Friends" | 2020 | Meidai.Denaun | Rashad | |
| "Fuel" | 2024 | Eminem, JID | The Death of Slim Shady (Coup de Grâce) | |
| "God Gotta Afro" | 2024 | 2026 | Rapsody | God Gotta Afro & Gold Hoops |

Notes

- ^{^[a]} signifies an additional producer.
- ^{^[b]} signifies a co-producer.
