= L.A.R.S. =

American hip hop duo

- Also known as: The Davidians; Lars; Last American Rock Stars
- Origin: Detroit, Michigan, U.S.
- Genres: Horrorcore
- Years active: 2008; 2017–present
- Label: Majik Ninja
- Members: Bizarre; King Gordy

L.A.R.S. (sometimes stylized as Lars, an acronym of Last American Rock Stars) is an American horrorcore duo, formed in Detroit, Michigan, consisting of rappers Bizarre (of D12) and King Gordy (of the Fat Killahz). They signed to Twiztid's independent record label Majik Ninja Entertainment on August 16, 2017.

== Formation ==
In 2003, D12 rapper Bizarre provided guest appearance on King Gordy's debut album The Entity on the track "Time to Die". In 2005, Gordy sung the hook on Bizarre's debut solo album Hannicap Circus on the song "Ghetto Music". In 2007, Gordy appeared on six songs of Bizarre's Blue Cheese & Coney Island, and Bizzy appeared on Gordy's Van Dyke and Harper Music and Cobain's Diary. In 2008, they formed a hip hop duo called the Davidians. The Davidians appeared on Esham's mixtape The Butcher Shop and Gordy's The Great American Weed Smoker, seeking a record label to sign them. The duo continued appearing on each other's projects and also was featured on Prozak's Tales from the Sick (2008), Snowgoons' Snowgoons Dynasty (2012), Fury's One of 12 (2016).

In 2017, the duo changed their name to L.A.R.S. (Last American Rock Stars) and signed a contract with Twiztid's independent record label Majik Ninja Entertainment. They released their debut mixtape Foul World on October 30, 2017, and appeared on Twiztid Presents: Year of the Sword. Their first full-length album, Last American Rock Stars, was released on February 16, 2018. It debuted at number 6 on the US Billboard Heatseekers Albums.

== Discography ==
=== Studio albums ===
- 2018 – Last American Rock Stars

=== Mixtapes ===
- 2017 – Foul World

=== Guest appearances ===
Year	Title	Artist(s)	Album
2003	"Time To Die"	King Gordy	The Entity
2005	"Ghetto Music"	Bizarre, Swifty McVay, stic.man	Hannicap Circus
2007	"Squeeze Dat"	King Gordy	Van Dyke and Harper Music
2007	"U Cakin"	King Gordy	Cobain's Diary
2007	"Rock Out"	Bizarre	Blue Cheese & Coney Island
2007	"Knock 'Em Out"	Bizarre, Tech N9ne	Blue Cheese & Coney Island
2007	"Animal"	Bizarre, Razaaq	Blue Cheese & Coney Island
2007	"Wicked"	Bizarre, Twiztid	Blue Cheese & Coney Island
2007	"Cakin'"	Bizarre, DubMuzik, Gam, Scarchild	Blue Cheese & Coney Island
2007	"Fat Boy"	Bizarre, Monica Blaire	Blue Cheese & Coney Island
2008	"?????"	Esham	The Butcher Shop
2008	"Psycho, Psycho, Psycho!"	Prozak	Tales from the Sick
2008	"Smokin' Budha"	King Gordy	The Great American Weed Smoker
2008	"Good Weed"	King Gordy	The Great American Weed Smoker
2010	"Dear Mother"	King Gordy, Kehoa, Prozak	Xerxes The God-King
2010	"Whatcha Smokin' On"	Bizarre	Friday Night at St. Andrews
2010	"Wild Like Us"	Bizarre	Friday Night at St. Andrews
2010	"Rock It Out"	Bizarre	Friday Night at St. Andrews
2011	"Travelin' Man"	King Gordy	Jesus Christ's Mistress
2012	"The Rapture"	Snowgoons, Swifty McVay, Meth Mouth, Sean Strange	Snowgoons Dynasty
2012	"Psycho Bill"	King Gordy	Hail Dark Lord Vader
2013	"Taking Lives"	Fury	Taking Lives
2013	"I Don't Know What I Did Last Night"	Fury, Brotha Lynch Hung	Taking Lives
2016	"Jerry Springer"	Fury	One of 12
2017	"Fall From Grace"	Jimmy Donn	How to Gag a Maggot
2017	"Get High"	Triple Threat, Axe Murder Boyz, Mr. Grey	Twiztid Presents: Year of the Sword
2017	"B.N.U. (Brand New Underground)"	Samhein Witch Killlaz, G-Mo Skee, Axe Murder Boyz, Gorilla Voltage, Boondox, Lex the Hex Master	Twiztid Presents: Year of the Sword
2017	"It’s a Hold Up"	Twiztid	Twiztid Presents: Year of the Sword
2019	"Leatherface"	Hopsin, Lazarus	Rufus

=== Music videos ===
Year	Title	Artist(s)	Album
2004	U R the One	D12	D12 World
2017	Savage Life	L.A.R.S. w/Foul Mouth	Foul World (Mixtape)
2017	Last American Rock Stars	L.A.R.S.	Foul World (Mixtape)
2017	I'm The Plug (Fuck Yo Baby Daddy)	L.A.R.S. ft. Big T	Foul World (Mixtape)
2017	Suicide	L.A.R.S.	Last American Rock Stars
2017	It's A Hold Up	L.A.R.S.	Twiztid Presents: Year Of The Sword
2018	Lit	L.A.R.S.	Last American Rock Stars
2018	L.A.R.S. Spangled Banner	L.A.R.S.	Last American Rock Stars
2018	Ganja Man	L.A.R.S.	Last American Rock Stars
2018	Cocaine In Miami	L.A.R.S.	Last American Rock Stars
2019	American Rockstar	L.A.R.S.	N/A
