= Twiztid Presents: Year of the Sword =

Compilation album by Majik Ninja Entertainment
- Released: December 1, 2017
- Genres: Hardcore hip hop; horrorcore; rap rock; underground hip hop
- Length: 62:51 (Standard edition); 93:08 (with Bonus Disc)
- Labels: Majik Ninja Entertainment, INgrooves Music Group
- Producers: Tunna Beats, Seven, Godsynth Productions, Young Wicked, The R.O.C., Fritz "the Cat" Van Kosky, Subliminal Beats, Iniko Beats, Foul Mouth, The Deadbeatz, Mac Mowl

Twiztid Presents: Year of the Sword is a compilation album performed by various artists of American independent record label Majik Ninja Entertainment. It was released on December 1, 2017, and features performances by the entire MNE roster, including Twiztid, Axe Murder Boyz, Gorilla Voltage, L.A.R.S., Blaze Ya Dead Homie, Lex the Hex Master, The R.O.C., G-Mo Skee, and Boondox.

The album peaked at number 81 on the Billboard 200, at number 34 on the Top R&B/Hip-Hop Albums, at number 25 on the Top Rap Albums, at number 3 on the Independent Albums, and at number 31 on the Top Album Sales.

== Track listing ==
Year Of The Sword
No.	Title	Producer(s)	Length
1.	"Test of Time" (Intro) (performed by Twiztid)		1:29
2.	"Heads Will Roll" (performed by Jamie Madrox & Gorilla Voltage)	Tunna Beats	3:39
3.	"Turn it Up" (performed by Jamie Madrox, Blaze Ya Dead Homie, Lex the Hex Master & Bonez Dubb)	Seven	3:35
4.	"Fucked" (performed by The R.O.C., Boondox & Gorilla Voltage)	Godsynth Productions	4:18
5.	"Level Up!" (Skit 1) (performed by Twiztid)		0:15
6.	"Their Fault" (performed by Jamie Madrox & Young Wicked)	Young Wicked	2:12
7.	"Ignite" (performed by Monoxide Child, Zodiac MPrint, Mr. Grey & King Gordy)	The R.O.C. & Fritz "the Cat" Van Kosky	3:42
8.	"Cut Em Up" (performed by Twiztid & Young Wicked)	Young Wicked	5:03
9.	"Lights Out" (performed by Twiztid, G-Mo Skee & Mr. Grey)	Seven	3:32
10.	"Harassment" (Skit 2) (performed by Twiztid)		0:29
11.	"Don't Fuck Wit Us" (performed by House of Krazees, Lex the Hex Master & ClockworC)	Seven	4:58
12.	"Better Than Ever B4" (performed by Triple Threat, Lex the Hex Master, G-Mo Skee & Axe Murder Boyz)	Young Wicked	4:41
13.	"Flix N' Chill" (performed by ClocworC, Triple Threat & Young Wicked)	Godsynth Productions	4:45
14.	"Get High" (performed by Triple Threat, Axe Murder Boyz, Mr. Grey & L.A.R.S.)	Godsynth Productions	6:30
15.	"Galaxy" (performed by Jamie Madrox, G-Mo Skee & King Gordy)	Subliminal Beats	2:39
16.	"Don't Tell Me" (performed by Twiztid, King Gordy & Boondox)	Iniko Beats	3:50
17.	"Summon the Majik Ninja" (Skit 3) (performed by Twiztid)		0:19
18.	"B.N.U." (performed by The MNE Family)	Fritz "the Cat" Van Kosky	6:19
19.	"Did You Unplug It?" (Outro) (performed by Twiztid)		0:43
Total length:			62:51

MNE Bonus Disc
No.	Title	Producer(s)	Length
20.	"MNE Intro" (performed by Twiztid)		0:11
21.	"It’s a Hold Up" (performed by L.A.R.S.)	Foul Mouth	3:05
22.	"Chaos Incarnate" (performed by Gorilla Voltage)	Godsynth Productions	3:41
23.	"When I Get On" (performed by G-Mo Skee)	Godsynth Productions	2:53
24.	"Twenty-Seven" (performed by Boondox)	Seven	3:23
25.	"Beast" (performed by Lex the Hex Master)	Seven	3:02
26.	"The Trunk" (performed by Blaze Ya Dead Homie)	Fritz "the Cat" Van Kosky	3:22
27.	"Grindin'" (performed by Axe Murder Boyz)	Young Wicked	3:27
28.	"They Shall Believe" (performed by The R.O.C.)	The Deadbeatz	3:23
29.	"Time Bomb" (performed by Twiztid)	Mac Mowl	3:50
Total length:			30:17

== Personnel ==
- James Spaniolo – performer (tracks: 1–3, 5–6, 8–20, 29)
- Paul Robert Methric – performer (tracks: 1, 5, 7–14, 16–20, 29)
- Chris Rouleau – performer (tracks: 3, 7, 12–14, 18, 26)
- James "Young Wicked" Garcia – performer (tracks: 6, 8, 12–14, 18, 27)
- Mr. Grey – performer (tracks: 2, 4, 7, 9, 14, 18, 22)
- Waverly Walter Alford III – performer (tracks: 7, 14–16, 18, 21)
- Jaron "G-Mo Skee" Johnson – performer (tracks: 9, 12, 15, 18, 23)
- Mike "Bonez Dubb" Garcia – performer (tracks: 3, 12, 14, 18, 27)
- Cole "ClockworC" Salles – performer (tracks: 2, 4, 11, 18, 22)
- Lex The Hex Master – performer (tracks: 3, 11–12, 18, 25)
- Bryan Jones – performer (tracks: 4, 7, 11, 18, 28)
- Rufus Johnson – performer (tracks: 14, 18, 21)
- David Hutto – performer (tracks: 4, 16, 18, 24)

== Charts ==
Chart (2017)	Peak position
US Billboard 200	81
US Top R&B/Hip-Hop Albums (Billboard)	34
US Top Rap Albums (Billboard)	25
US Independent Albums (Billboard)	3
