= Taking Lives (album) =

Studio album by Something Awful
- Released: September 11, 2013
- Recorded: 2011–2013
- Genre: Underground rap
- Length: 1:22:38
- Label: Intrinz INK Records
- Producers: Fury; Micka Mexican; Danny Damnage; Hala-X; Atomic Beats; 2 Deep; Evelution; Black; Allrounda Productions; Beat G33ks; Adamac; C4

Bizarre chronology
Friday Night At St. Andrews (2010)	Taking Lives (2013)	Last American Rock Stars (2018)

Fury chronology
Plan B (2006)	Taking Lives (2013)	One Of 12 (2016)

Taking Lives is the debut album of the American hip-hop duo Something Awful, which consists of rapper Fury (born Jay Flores) and Detroit-based emcee Bizarre (born Rufus Johnson). Fellow Bizarre's bandmates from D12 (Kuniva and Swifty McVay) and L.A.R.S. (King Gordy) made guest appearances on the record, as well as Fury's Mattrix, White Out and Bloody-T from Lethal Wreckords, among other performers such as Bizzy Bone, Brotha Lynch Hung and Twisted Insane. This album is also volume 47 of Underground Hustlin series because of cypher.

== Track listing ==
No.	Title	Producer	Length
1.	"Intro"	Fury	0:55
2.	"Smoke You" (featuring Bizzy Bone, Madecipha, Sean Strange)	Hala-X	5:12
3.	"Taking Lives" (featuring King Gordy)	Micka Mexican	3:58
4.	"The Babysitter" (Skit)	Fury	1:07
5.	"Awful World" (featuring Bloody T, Intrinzik, Kryptik)	Danny Damnage	3:54
6.	"Love The Way You Die" (featuring DTS, Whiteout)	Danny Damnage	4:01
7.	"I'm Crazy" (featuring Ether, Lewn, Majik Duce, The Jokerr, Trikkd Out)	Atomic Beats	5:53
8.	"Family" (featuring Tre Lb, Twisted Insane)	2 Deep	4:48
9.	"Peeping Tom" (featuring Bob E. Nite, Q Strange)	Evelution	5:36
10.	"I Don't Know What I Did Last Night" (featuring Brotha Lynch Hung, King Gordy)	Black	4:28
11.	"Day Off" (featuring DTS, Dr. Gigglez)	Allrounda Productions	3:38
12.	"The Cypher" (featuring D12, Leathal Wreckords)	Beat G33ks	5:43
13.	"I Can Do Anything" (featuring B-Lieve)	Adamac	5:08
14.	"Next Level" (featuring Freeze)	Micka Mexican	4:20

Taking Lives Cypher (Bonus Track)
No.	Title	Producer	Length
15.	"Taking Lives Cypher Verse"	C4	1:05
16.	"Taking Lives Cypher Verse"	C4	0:33
17.	"Taking Lives Cypher Verse"	C4	0:33
18.	"Taking Lives Cypher Verse"	C4	0:33
19.	"Taking Lives Cypher Verse"	C4	0:33
20.	"Taking Lives Cypher Verse"	C4	0:32
21.	"Taking Lives Cypher Verse"	C4	1:06
22.	"Taking Lives Cypher Verse"	C4	1:06
23.	"Taking Lives Cypher Verse"	C4	1:06
24.	"Taking Lives Cypher Verse"	C4	1:06
25.	"Taking Lives Cypher Verse"	C4	0:32
26.	"Taking Lives Cypher Verse"	C4	1:06
27.	"Taking Lives Cypher Verse"	C4	0:33
28.	"Taking Lives Cypher Verse"	C4	0:32
29.	"Taking Lives Cypher Verse"	C4	0:16
30.	"Taking Lives Cypher Verse"	C4	1:06
31.	"Taking Lives Cypher Verse"	C4	1:06
32.	"Taking Lives Cypher Verse"	C4	0:41
33.	"Taking Lives Cypher Verse"	C4	0:41
34.	"Taking Lives Cypher Verse"	C4	0:33
35.	"Taking Lives Cypher Verse"	C4	0:16
36.	"Taking Lives Cypher Verse"	C4	0:16
37.	"Taking Lives Cypher Verse"	C4	1:06
38.	"Taking Lives Cypher Verse"	C4	1:07
39.	"Taking Lives Cypher Verse"	C4	0:52
Total length:			1:22:38

- †Song "Taking Lives" contains guitars by Dos The Boss
- †Song "The Cypher" contains uncredited raps by B Reign, Ether, Kuniva, Mattrix, Freeze, Swifty McVay, Top Prospect, Whiteout
- †Song "I Can Do Anything" contains uncredited vocals by Lexxi
- †Song "Taking Lives Cypher (Bonus Track)" appears as a 19:05 duration track only in physical version of the album and consists of rap verses by Bizarre, Fury, Intrinzik, Trikkd Out, Chuck E Lee, C DANGER, Insane LOC, KZK, Mr. Grey, JD, D CrazE, Kingfiend & Sixthree, Heaven, SNAP, Dead Body Kingz, Thic Man, Psyco Sick Asylum, Doze, YDMC, Crisus, Jonny Wierdo, Masta, MC Gan, 2 Much

== Personnel ==
- Bizzy Bone – guest appearance
- D12 – guest appearance
- King Gordy – guest appearance
- Kryptik – guest appearance
- McNastee – design and layout
- Something Awful – group
