= King of Horrorcore II =

King of Horrorcore Vol. 2

Mixtape by King Gordy
- Released: August 13, 2009
- Recorded: 2009
- Genre: Hardcore rap; horrorcore
- Length: 39:13
- Label: Morbid Music; CD Baby
- Producer: King Gordy (exec.); Big Tone; Dub Muzik; Fitt; Geno XO; Guala; Jake Bass; Mr Wright

King Gordy chronology
The Great American Weed Smoker (2008)	King of Horrorcore Vol. 2 (2009)	Xerxes Is The God-King (2010)

King of Horrorcore II is the second mixtape by horrorcore rap artist King Gordy from Detroit. The album is a follow-up to his 2005 release The King of Horrorcore!.

== Track listing ==
No.	Title	Writer(s)	Length
1.	"Intro/Get It On"	Waverly W. Alford III	7:55
2.	"Jigsaw"	Waverly W. Alford III	2:55
3.	"Cobain Is Back"	Waverly W. Alford III	3:02
4.	"King"	Waverly W. Alford III	3:59
5.	"Move Along"	Waverly W. Alford III	2:23
6.	"Come Outside" (featuring The Fat Killahz)	Waverly W. Alford III; Shabazz Ford; Marvin O'Neal; Rudolph Rinchere	3:33
7.	"Misunderstood"	Waverly W. Alford III	2:36
8.	"This World"	Waverly W. Alford III	2:38
9.	"Mr. 187"	Waverly W. Alford III	3:09
10.	"Scare You"	Waverly W. Alford III	3:24
11.	"Kelly Osbourne"	Waverly W. Alford III	3:39
Total length:			39:13
