= Tales from the Sick =

Studio album by Prozak
- Released: June 3, 2008
- Recorded: 2007–2008
- Genre: Hip hop
- Length: 73:26
- Label: Strange Music, RBC Records, Fontana Distribution
- Producer: Judd Saul, George "Gee" Pierce, The Legendary Traxster, Mike E. Clark, Robert Bradley, Robert Rebeck, Seven

Prozak chronology
Aftabirth (2001)	Tales from the Sick (2008)	Paranormal (2012)

Professional ratings
Review scores
Source	Rating
RapReviews	(9/10)

Tales from the Sick is the debut studio album by American rapper Prozak. Released on June 3, 2008, it is his first release on Strange Music and his first release of solo material following his first solo EP Aftabirth in 2001. The album peaked at #8 on the Billboard Top Heatseekers chart, #25 on the Top Independent Albums chart and #52 on the Top R&B/Hip-Hop Albums chart.

== Track listing ==
No.	Title	Writer(s)	Producer(s)	Length
1.	"The Hitchcock of Hip-Hop"	M. Summers and S. Shippy	Seven	02:36
2.	"Fun n' Games"	M. Summers and S. Shippy	Seven	02:57
3.	"Keep Grindin'" (featuring Krizz Kaliko)	S. Lindsey, S. Shippy and S. Watson	The Legendary Traxster	03:21
4.	"Scapegoat"	M. Summers and S. Shippy	Seven	03:13
5.	"Go to Hell"	M. Summers and S. Shippy	Seven	02:53
6.	"Crossing Over"	M. Summers and S. Shippy	Seven	02:56
7.	"It Was You (Intro)"	R. Bradley and S. Shippy	Robert Bradley	00:41
8.	"It Was You" (featuring Krizz Kaliko)	M. Summers, S. Shippy and S. Watson	Seven	03:54
9.	"Why???" (featuring Tech N9ne & Twista)	A. Yates, C. Mitchell, G. Pierce and S. Shippy	George "Gee" Pierce	03:28
10.	"Run Away" (featuring Tech N9ne & Krizz Kaliko)	A. Yates, G. Pierce, S. Shippy and S. Watson	George "Gee" Pierce	04:15
11.	"Corporate Genocide"	R. Rebeck and S. Shippy	Robert Rebeck	03:22
12.	"Bombs Away"	R. Rebeck and S. Shippy	Robert Rebeck	03:09
13.	"Holy War" (performed by Project: Deadman)	M. Clark and S. Shippy	Mike E. Clark	03:28
14.	"It's Too Late Now" (performed by Project: Deadman)	M. Clark and S. Shippy	Mike E. Clark	03:16
15.	"Insane" (performed by Project: Deadman featuring Insane Clown Posse)	J. Bruce, J. Ustler, M. Clark and S. Shippy	Mike E. Clark	03:48
16.	"Bodies Fall" (featuring Tech N9ne, Kutt Calhoun & Zodiac MPrint)	A. Yates, B. Jones, C. Rouleau, G. Pierce, M. Calhoun Jr., R. Rebeck and S. Shippy	Robert Rebeck	03:14
17.	"Psycho, Psycho, Psycho!" (featuring L.A.R.S.)	G. Pierce, R. Johnson, S. Shippy and W. Alford III	George "Gee" Pierce	03:24
18.	"Drugs"	M. Summers and S. Shippy	Seven	03:17
19.	"Living in the Fog" (featuring Cypress Hill)	L. Freese, M. Summers, S. Reyes and S. Shippy	Seven	04:20
20.	"Fading…" (featuring Twiztid & Krizz Kaliko)	G. Pierce, J. Spaniolo, P. Methric, S. Shippy and S. Watson	George "Gee" Pierce	04:22
21.	"Good Enough" (performed by Project: Deadman)	M. Clark, S. Shippy	Mike E. Clark	03:48
22.	"Under the Rain" (featuring Krizz Kaliko)	M. Summers, S. Shippy and S. Watson	Seven	03:44
Total length:				73:26
