= Cobain's Diary =

Studio album by King Gordy
- Released: August 1, 2007
- Recorded: 2007
- Genre: Hardcore rap; horrorcore
- Label: Morbid Music
- Producer: Olaf Johnson (exec.); Jake Bass (co.)

King Gordy chronology
Van Dyke and Harper Music (2007)	Cobain's Diary (2007)	The Great American Weed Smoker (2008)

Cobain's Diary is the third studio album by Detroit rap artist King Gordy.

== Track listing ==
All tracks are written by Waverly W. Alford III except where noted.

No.	Title	Writer(s)	Length
1.	"Intro"	Alford III	1:03
2.	"They've Come For Me (Nightmares Pt. 2)"		3:20
3.	"Cobainiac" (performed by L.A.R.S.)	Rufus Johnson; Alford III	3:38
4.	"Go And Get A Knife"		4:26
5.	"Beautiful Day"		3:36
6.	"Damien"		4:00
7.	"El Diablo"		4:10
8.	"Chasing People Thru The Woods"		4:12
9.	"Love" (performed by the Fat Killahz)	Alford III; Shabazz Ford; Marvin O'Neil; Bang Belushi	3:58
10.	"The Gift And The Curse" (featuring Monica Blaire)	Alford III; Blaire White	4:27
11.	"Worship Me / Murder Me" (featuring Sal)		3:43
12.	"Outro"		1:14
