= King Gordy Sings the Blues =

Studio album by King Gordy
- Released: February 15, 2011
- Recorded: 2004
- Studio: F.B.T. Studios (Ferndale, MI)
- Genre: Underground hip hop
- Length: 43:24
- Label: Morbid Music
- Producer: Silent Riot; Paradime; King Gordy

King Gordy chronology
| Xerxes Is The God-King (2010) | King Gordy Sings the Blues (2011) | Last American Rock Stars (2018) |

King Gordy Sings the Blues is the sixth studio album by American rapper King Gordy. It was recorded in 2004 in F.B.T. Studios in Ferndale, Michigan, and released on February 15, 2011, via Morbid Music L.L.C. Production was handled by Silent Riot, Paradime and King Gordy himself.

== Track listing ==
All tracks are written by Waverly W. Alford III.

| No. | Title | Producer(s) | Length |
|---|---|---|---|
| 1. | "Never Seen A Man" | Silent Riot | 2:16 |
| 2. | "Party Outside" | Silent Riot | 4:21 |
| 3. | "I Don't Need Ya" | Silent Riot | 3:10 |
| 4. | "Gordy The Great" | Silent Riot | 3:52 |
| 5. | "I'll Fly Away" | Silent Riot | 4:03 |
| 6. | "Banned From TV" | Silent Riot; King Gordy (co.) | 4:08 |
| 7. | "Bridges To Burn" | Paradime | 5:11 |
| 8. | "Mrs. Calgon" | Silent Riot | 4:57 |
| 9. | "Somethin' For You" | Silent Riot | 4:05 |
| 10. | "Lovebirds" | Silent Riot | 3:56 |
| 11. | "Rule The World" | Silent Riot; King Gordy (co.) | 3:25 |
| Total length: | | | 43:24 |

== Personnel ==
- Waverly Walter Alford III – writer, performer, co-producer (tracks: 6, 11)
- Frederick Beauregard – producer (track 7)
- Che Patterson – design & photography
- Silent Riot – producer (tracks: 1–6, 8–11)
