= Nowhere Fast =

Nowhere Fast may refer to:

- "Nowhere Fast" (Eminem song)
- "Nowhere Fast" (Fire Inc. song)
- "Nowhere Fast", a song by Blackalicious from Blazing Arrow
- "Nowhere Fast", a song by EarthGang from Rags
- "Nowhere Fast", a song by Incubus from Make Yourself
- "Nowhere Fast", a song by Old Dominion from Meat and Candy
- "Nowhere Fast", a song by Pennywise from Full Circle
- "Nowhere Fast", a song by Proof from I Miss the Hip Hop Shop
- "Nowhere Fast", a song by The Smiths from Meat Is Murder
