= Van Dyke and Harper Music =

Van Dyke & Harper Music

Studio album by King Gordy
- Released: 2007
- Recorded: 2006–2007
- Studio: 54 Sound (Detroit, Michigan)
- Genre: Underground hip hop; horrorcore
- Length: 58:19
- Label: Morbid Music
- Producer: Olaf Johnson (exec.); Astray; Marvwon; Geno; Paradime; 1st Born; Eric Clapton; Shaphan "Maestro" Williams

King Gordy chronology
King Of Horrorcore! (2006)	Van Dyke & Harper Music (2007)	Cobain's Diary (2007)

Van Dyke and Harper Music is the second studio album by American horrorcore rapper King Gordy. The record was released in 2007 via Morbid Music LLC.

In the booklet of the CD it says that this album is dedicated to Cordaro "Cord" Larkins (1986–2006) and Deshaun "Proof" Holten (1973–2006).

== Track listing ==
Van Dyke and Harper Music
No.	Title	Writer(s)	Producer(s)	Length
1.	"Intro"	Waverly W. Alford III	Eric Clapton	1:23
2.	"Come With Me"	Alford	Geno	1:30
3.	"Gettin' Paid"	Alford	Astray	3:18
4.	"Dope Dealer"	Alford	Astray	5:07
5.	"Leave It Alone"	Alford	Astray	3:42
6.	"60/80"	Alford	Astray	4:54
7.	"Drug Money"	Alford	Geno	3:54
8.	"The Wall"	Alford	Shaphan "Maestro" Williams; Marv Won	4:12
9.	"Sunshine (Freestyle)"	Alford	Astray	1:11
10.	"The Life"	Alford	Astray	4:18
11.	"Animal (O.K. Then)"	Alford	Astray	5:04
12.	"Ol Skool Shit"	Alford	Astray	0:53
13.	"Squeeze Dat" (featuring Bizarre)	Alford; Rufus Johnson	1st Born	3:07
14.	"Big Shot"	Alford	Astray	3:55
15.	"I Need A Ho"	Alford	Astray	4:16
16.	"Get Up" (featuring The Fat Killahz)	Alford; Shabazz Ford; Marvin O'Neil; Bang Belushi	Marv Won	3:03
17.	"Get High (Interlude)"	Alford	Astray	1:16
18.	"That's Detroit"	Alford	Paradime	4:06
Total length:				58:19

== Personnel ==
- Cleveland L. "1st Born" Hurd – producer on track 13 for Iron Fist Records
- Astray – producer on tracks 3, 4, 5, 6, 9, 10, 11, 12, 14, 15, 17
- Brian Berryman – mixing, recording
- C&O Entertainment – booking
- Eric Clapton – producer on track 1
- Frederick "Paradime" Beauregard – producer on track 18 for Beats At Will productions
- Geno – producer on tracks 2 and 7 for Cognac Grooves productions
- George Tasseff – engineering
- Marvin "Marv Won" Oneal – producer on tracks 8 and 16 for Silent Riot productions
- Olaf Johnson – executive production and management
- Rufus "Bizarre" Johnson – performer on track 13
- Shabazz "Fatt Father" Ford – performer on track 16
- Shaphan "Maestro" Williams – producer on track 8 for Silent Riot productions
- Tony Campana – mixing, recording
- Waverly W. "King Gordy" Alford III – songwriter, primary artist, performer
- Zamir productions – artwork and design
