= Danny Boy: The Life & Times of a Kid in the D =

Danny Boy: The Life & Times Of A Kid In The D

Studio album by Hush
- Released: October 14, 2014
- Studio: Audiomagic, Eastpointe, MI
- Genre: Rap rock; hip hop
- Length: 58:30
- Label: Danny Boy Records
- Producer: Hush (also exec.); Scott Sumner

Hush chronology
The Open Book (2009)	Danny Boy: The Life & Times Of A Kid In The D (2014)

Danny Boy: The Life & Times Of A Kid In The D is the fifth studio album by American rapper Hush. It was released on October 14, 2014 also as a digital album via Danny Boy Records.

To promote his comeback record, Hush dropped music videos "So Fly"(in 2013) and "Sprinklers"(in 2014) both directed by Gerard Victor.

Due to this record, Hush was nominated for Detroit Music award in 2014 as Outstanding Hip-Hop Artist/Group, but lost to Critical Bill.

== Track listing ==
No.	Title	Length
1.	"The Light" (featuring Melanie Rutherford)	4:10
2.	"So Fly" (featuring Melanie Rutherford)	4:12
3.	"D Life" (featuring Melanie Rutherford)	4:05
4.	"Let's Talk About"	4:28
5.	"Josephine" (featuring Cadillac Dale)	5:01
6.	"Could It Be" (featuring Melanie Rutherford)	3:57
7.	"Bad Boys" (featuring Dwele & T3)	3:12
8.	"Sprinklers" (featuring Monica Blaire)	5:19
9.	"The Attict"	3:04
10.	"You Ain't Never" (featuring Marv Won & Cadillac Dale)	4:38
11.	"Can U C Me Now" (featuring Melanie Rutherford)	4:20
12.	"Keep It Comin'" (featuring Ro Spit)	3:24
13.	"All The Way" (featuring Stray)	3:46
14.	"It's Not Over" (featuring Stray)	4:15
15.	"You Ain't Never (Raw Rugged Mix)" (featuring Marv Won & Cadillac Dale)	4:16
Total length:		58:30

== Personnel ==
- Daniel Carlisle – producer, executive producer
- Greg Calbi – mastering
- Scott Sumner – producer
