= Rockstar (Bizarre song) =

2005 song by Bizarre

Single by Bizarre

from the album Hannicap Circus
- B-side: "I'm So Cool"
- Released: May 24, 2005
- Studio: 54 Sound (Detroit, Michigan)
- Genre: Hip hop
- Length: 3:01
- Label: Sanctuary Urban
- Songwriter(s): Rufus Johnson; Marshall Mathers; Luis Resto
- Producer(s): Eminem; Luis Resto (add.)

Bizarre singles chronology
"What What" (1998)	"Rockstar" (2005)	"Fatboy" (2007)

Music video
- "Rockstar" on YouTube

"Rockstar" is a song by American rapper Bizarre from his debut solo studio album Hannicap Circus. It was released on May 24, 2005 via Sanctuary Urban as the album's lead single.

Written by Bizarre, Eminem and Luis Resto, the song was produced by Eminem with Resto's additional production. Recording sessions took place at 54 Sound in Detroit with Mike Strange and Tony Campagna. Audio mixing was handled by Eminem and Steve King.

The song continues on the plot from the D12 single "My Band", focusing on Bizarre leaving D12 to make a successful solo career. The music video shows the truth however, as there are no fans in the audience when Bizarre raps "I'm on stage with thousands of fans". Bizarre's slob, pervert, and violent image are also promoted, with a messy room, "girls thirteen to eighteen," and punching a waitress. AllMusic reviewer David Jeffries calls the song "an equally infectious and herky-jerky sequel" to "My Band".

== Music video ==
The music video for "Rockstar" starts in a room with women's underwear dropped in all the room, and Bizarre sleeping in a bed, then Bizarre gets up and starts to rap, suddenly appears in front of giant letters which say "BIZARRE" in red color, and then walks in the streets, then appears live in a concert on a stage with blue chairs but there is nobody at the concert, appears dancing with people dressed like rabbits, suddenly appears on a motorcycle with a girl, later appears women with bikinis who jump into a pool, Eminem and D12 make cameo appearances, disturbing Bizarre, the music video was filmed in Detroit.

== Live Performances ==
"Rockstar" has only had two live performances, that being on the Live from New York City concert film, a part of the Anger Management Tour. After D12 (sans Bizarre) stop performing the song How Come, the group ask where Bizarre is. Bizarre then tells the group to get off of the stage. He then performs the first two hooks and the first verse.

The second performance was in Chicago at the House of Blues after D12 (minus Eminem) stopped performing the song Revelation.

== Track listing ==
No.	Title	Writer(s)	Producer(s)	Length
1.	"Rockstar" (Radio Version Clean)	Rufus Johnson; Marshall Mathers; Luis Resto	Eminem; Luis Resto (add.)	3:06
2.	"I'm So Cool" (Radio Version Clean)	Rufus Johnson; Michael Chavarria; Timothy Thedford	Mike Chav	4:23
Total length:				7:29

== Personnel ==
- Rufus Johnson – songwriter, vocals
- Marshall Bruce Mathers III – songwriter, producer, mixing
- Luis Edgardo Resto – songwriter, keyboards, additional producer
- Michael Strange – recording
- Tony Campana – recording
- Steven King – mixing

== Charts ==
Chart (2005)	Peak position
Australia (ARIA)	50
Germany (GfK)	93
Netherlands (Single Top 100)	18
New Zealand (Recorded Music NZ)	35
UK Singles (OCC)	17
