= The Bridgecard EP =

EP by Shim-E-Bango
- Released: August 31, 2011
- Genre: Underground hip hop
- Length: 25:10
- Producer: Chanes

Shim-E-Bango chronology
The E.P. (2011)	The Bridgecard EP (2011)	The Herojuana EP (2016)

The Bridgecard EP is an extended play by American rapper Shim-E-Bango and his first solo recording since his participation with The Fat Killahz, who made guest appearances in this album along with fellow Detroit-based rappers Guilty Simpson, Miz Korona, Moe Dirdee, and Invy Da Truth.

Bango collaborates with Chanes who delivered production work on the entire record. The Bridgecard EP released as a free digital download album.

In September 2011, BangO dropped a single "Al Bundy", which named after character of U.S. television series Married... with Children.

== Track listing ==
No.	Title	Length
1.	"Intro"	2:08
2.	"I'm Like"	2:05
3.	"Give A Fuck" (featuring Moe Dirdee)	3:07
4.	"Great Goonga Moonga"	2:44
5.	"King Hippo"	3:22
6.	"Al Bundy" (featuring Guilty Simpson)	3:26
7.	"The Sun" (featuring Miz Korona, Fatt Father & Invy Da Truth)	4:14
8.	"V-Nasty" (featuring The Fat Killahz)	4:04
Total length:		25:10
