= Herojuana =

EP by Bang Belushi & King Gordy
- Released: August 20, 2016 (digital); October 30, 2016 (CD)
- Recorded: August 7, 2016
- Genre: Horrorcore; underground hip hop
- Length: 17:20
- Producer: Foulmouth; Jimbo Slice

King Gordy chronology
Hail Dark Lord Vader (2012)	Herojuana (2016)	Anakin (2017)

Bang Belushi chronology
The Bridgecard EP (2011)	Herojuana (2016)	Help Yourself (2017)

Herojuana is a collaborative extended play by American horrorcore rappers Bang Belushi and King Gordy from underground hip hop group the Fat Killahz.

The entire album has been recorded in six hours and produced by fellow Detroit producer Foul Mouth. The digital version released free on August 20, 2016. The duo have decided to put out a very limited run of a hundred hard copy albums available on October 30, 2016.

On August 14, 2016, they released a single for "Put It Out" via SoundCloud.

== Track listing ==
All tracks written and composed by Bang Belushi and King Gordy

No.	Title	Producer(s)	Length
1.	"Intro"	Foulmouth	2:20
2.	"Put It Out"	Foulmouth	2:46
3.	"Do My Drugs"	Foulmouth	2:48
4.	"Roaches"	Foulmouth	2:57
5.	"Stimulate Your Mind (My Legs)"	Foulmouth	3:22
6.	"Outro"	Foulmouth; Jimbo Slice	3:07
Total length:			17:20

== Personnel ==
- Bang Belushi – performer, composer
- Foul Mouth – producer, recording, mixing
- Jeff Milberg – artwork
- Jimbo Slice – producer
- King Gordy – composer, performer
- Tone Rizzo – mastering
