= The Open Book =

Studio album by Hush
- Released: July 20, 2009
- Genre: Rap rock
- Length: 52:07
- Label: Restraining Order

Hush chronology
Bulletproof (2005)	The Open Book (2009)	Danny Boy: The Life & Times Of A Kid In The D (2014)

The Open Book is the fourth album by American rapper Hush. It was released July 20, 2009, via Restraining Order Records.

== Track listing ==
No.	Title	Length
1.	"Pull Out A Pistol"	3:55
2.	"Rise Again"	5:07
3.	"I Am"	3:51
4.	"Adrenaline Rush"	3:37
5.	"We Rollin'" (featuring Quest M.C.O.D.Y., Marvwon & Chino XL)	5:37
6.	"Die For Me"	4:30
7.	"Put 'Em Up"	4:00
8.	"Pass The Mic"	3:26
9.	"Gone Today"	5:02
10.	"Contagious"	3:21
11.	"Scared Money"	4:55
12.	"The Open Book"	4:47
Total length:		52:07
