= Iron Fist Records =

- Founded: 2004
- Founder: Proof
- Status: Defunct
- Genre: Underground hip hop
- Country of origin: United States
- Location: Detroit, Michigan

Iron Fist Global LLC (previously Iron Fist Records) was an American hip-hop record label founded in 2004 by DeShaun 'Proof' Holton. Cleveland '1st Born' Hurd was the president and chief executive officer of the label, Khalid El Hakim was the vice-president and chief operations officer.

== Proof ==
The first album from Iron Fist Records was its founder, Proof, and his record titled I Miss The Hip Hop Shop, which released on June 15, 2004.

The label became well known with Iron Fist recorded Proof's first widespread solo album, Searching for Jerry Garcia, which included guest appearances by the likes of Method Man, B-Real, 50 Cent, Obie Trice, now deceased rappers Nate Dogg and MC Breed, the whole D12 band including Eminem. The album reached number 65 on the U.S. Billboard 200.

After Proof's death (April 11, 2006), 1st Born, a close friend of Big Proof became CEO and president of the label.

== 1st Born ==
Proof placed Cleveland L. Hurd (professionally known as 1st Born) the helm of his label Iron Fist Records. As an artist, he appeared in videos such as Eminem's "Like Toy Soldiers", D12's "Fight Music", Big Proof's "Gurls Wit Da Boom", Bizarre's "Hip Hop", and Obie Trice's "Cry Now". As CEO and founder of Detroit's award-winning rap group Purple G.A.N.G. (Gettin Anything Niggaz Got), he is also credited with touring nationally three times. Twice with Eminem on his Anger Management tours featuring 50 Cent, Ludacris, Ras Kass, Mobb Deep, Papa Roach, M.O.P., Executioners, Lil' Jon, Saafir, G-Unit, and Bonecrusher. He was also opened up for D12 on 'The D12 World Tour' alongside Slum Village, Guilty Simpson, Black Milk, and Fat Killahz. He has also opened shows for legendary acts such as the Souls Of Mischief, Xzibit, MC Breed, Wu-Tang Clan, Bubba Sparxxx, Twista and a host of others. In the past he has worked as project manager/marketing strategist for Fly High Entertainment/Hoopla/Universal artist. As President of Iron Fist Global he has been developing and determining market strategies for artists such as Big Proof, JerkNation, Big Dame, Azizz, J Hill, Comedian Howie Bell Spanky Hayes and DC's sensation Shif-T of Pretti Punk'd.

== Issues ==
Iron Fist Global is committed to preserving and honoring Big Proof's legacy as pioneer and leader in the music and arts industries through youth mentorship and educational scholarship programs. These initiatives focus in the areas of music and artist education for youth in the metro Detroit area, as well as the broader community.

== People ==
Some of the Detroit artists who were or still signed by IronFist Records:

- Purple Gang (Killa Kaunn, 1st Born, T-Flame, Young Famous)
- Supa Emcee
- J-Hill
- Az-Izz
- Ricky Rucker
- IMAC
- Big Dame
- Sovereign T
- Woof Pac (J Kid, Hostyle, Moe Dirdee)
- J Lee (producer)
- KenMak (producer)
- Spanky Hayes (comedian)

IronFist Records affiliative artists (credited as XFAM)

- Hex Murda & The Almighty Dreadnaughtz
- Raw Collection
- Runyon Ave

== Notable actions ==
Iron Fist Records LLC has received numerous awards for Lyricist of the year, Artist of the year, Group of the year, Album of the year and Mix Tape CD of the year honored by the Detroit Hip Hop Music awards from 2005 to 2006.
