= Roses & Razorblades =

Studio album by Hush
- Released: June 18, 2002
- Recorded: 2002
- Genre: Hip hop
- Length: 57:00
- Label: Restraining Order
- Producer: Hush; Cadillac Dale; BMX

Hush chronology
| There Goes The Neighborhood (2001) | Roses & Razorblades (2002) | Bulletproof (2005) |

Roses & Razorblades is the second album by American rapper Hush. It was released on June 18, 2002.

== Track listing ==
| No. | Title | Producer(s) | Length |
|---|---|---|---|
| 1. | "This Is It" (featuring Shane Capone) | Hush | 2:38 |
| 2. | "Get Down" | Hush | 4:26 |
| 3. | "Knuckle Up" (featuring Royce Da 5'9") | Hush | 4:03 |
| 4. | "You Don't Know Me" | Hush | 4:09 |
| 5. | "Back Where I Belong" | Hush | 3:22 |
| 6. | "Detroit Players" (featuring Cadillac Dale & Shane Capone) | Cadillac Dale | 4:18 |
| 7. | "Too Far Gone Now" (featuring Paradime) | Hush | 4:13 |
| 8. | "The One You Love To Hate" | Hush | 4:07 |
| 9. | "Run Ya Jewelz" | Hush | 3:46 |
| 10. | "Let It Bang" | Hush | 3:57 |
| 11. | "Hypnotized" | Hush | 3:57 |
| 12. | "Roses & Razorblades" (featuring Black Magic Crossing) | BMX; Hush | 3:50 |
| 13. | "Barricaded Gunman" | Hush | 6:04 |
| 14. | "Poetic Justice" | Hush | 4:03 |
| Total length: | | | 57:00 |

== Personnel ==
- Daniel Carlisle - main artist, producer (tracks 1–5, 7–14)
- Delbert Michael Greer - producer & guest artist (track 6)
- Diana McNary - guest artist (track 5)
- Frederick Beauregard - guest artist (track 7)
- Michael Carlisle - guest artist (track 8)
- Ryan Montgomery - guest artist (track 3)
- Shane Capone - guest artist (tracks 1, 6)
- BMX - producer (track 12)
- Black Magic Crossing - guest artists (track 12)
- DJ L - guest artist (track 5)
- Nancy Carlisle - guest artist (track 13)
- Seven - guest artist (track 5)
