= Bulletproof (Hush album) =

Studio album by Hush
- Released: August 23, 2005
- Genre: Hip hop; rap rock
- Length: 52:00
- Label: Geffen Records
- Producer: Jordan Schur (exec.); Beau Dozier; Eminem; Hush; Julian Bunetta; Luis Resto; Notes; Randy Lynch; Scott Sumner; Thom Panunzio

Hush chronology
Roses & Razorblades (2002)	Bulletproof (2005)	The Open Book (2009)

Bulletproof is the third studio album by American rapper Hush. It was released on August 23, 2005, via Geffen Records. The album features guest appearances from Eminem, Kuniva, Bizarre and Swifty McVay from D12, Bareda and Lo-Down from Raw Collection, and guitarist Phil Campbell. Bulletproof debuted at number 83 on the Billboard Top R&B/Hip-Hop Albums chart and number 39 on the Heatseekers Albums chart.

Bulletproof contains some of the songs from the reality TV series The Contender. A clean version of "Fired Up" is used in the 2005 video game Need for Speed: Most Wanted. The song "The March" was featured on ×X×: State of the Union (Music from the Motion Picture).

== Critical reception ==
Professional ratings
Review scores
Source	Rating
AllMusic	3.5/5 stars
PopMatters	5/10 stars
RapReviews	7.5/10
Rolling Stone	1/5 stars

Steve 'Flash' Juon of RapReviews wrote that "Hush's long overdue solo album won't thrust him into the upper echelons of hip-hop's elite overnight, but it certainly proves that he's not a flash in the pan MC or a rapper just looking to get a break because of his connections. With or without MC Ill or his friend Marshall, Hush can definitely stand on his own." AllMusic's David Jeffries commended the record for its "worthy club numbers" ("Let it Breathe", "Off to Tijuana") and "tough and deep" "guitar-filled street music", but critiqued that it demands to be given "classic status", concluding that "Bulletproof doesn't quite figure out the best way to present the talented rapper, but it's a problem debuts from lesser hip-hoppers wish they were burdened with." Mike Schiller of PopMatters wrote, "Bulletproof is a surprisingly decent album with no skits (hooray!), lots of rock guitars, average beats, some big name guest stars (thumbs up for Kweli, thumbs down for Nate Dogg), and a white rapper from Detroit who just can't seem to step out of the shadow of the white rapper from Detroit. As a character study, it's really pretty interesting. As a rap album, well…it could be worse." Conversely, Rolling Stone's Christian Hoard felt that Hush was overcompensating by making cheesy boasts and employing rock guitars as a "generic signifier of authenticity and skin color", concluding that: "All he succeeds in doing is to make D12 sound like true rhyme talents in comparison."

== Track listing ==
No.	Title	Producer(s)	Length
1.	"My Introduction"	Julian Bunetta	4:04
2.	"Fired Up"	Julian Bunetta	3:26
3.	"Hush Is Coming" (featuring Nate Dogg)	Eminem; Luis Resto^{[a]}	4:51
4.	"Let It Breathe" (featuring Talib Kweli)	Julian Bunetta	4:00
5.	"Put 'Em Down (Shake the Ground)"	Julian Bunetta	3:47
6.	"Real TV" (featuring Bizarre)	Beau Dozier	4:16
7.	"The March"	Hush; Randy Lynch^{[b]}; Scott Sumner^{[b]}	5:12
8.	"24 Hours"	Hush; Randy Lynch^{[b]}; Scott Sumner^{[b]}	4:07
9.	"Superstar"	Julian Bunetta	3:57
10.	"Off to Tijuana" (featuring Kuniva, Swifty McVay and Eminem)	Eminem; Luis Resto^{[a]}	4:18
11.	"Woodpecker"	Hush	4:21
12.	"Rock Shit" (featuring Bareda and Lo-Down)	Notes; Hush^{[a]}; Thom Panunzio^{[a]}	5:41
Total length:			52:00

Notes

- ^{^[a]} signifies an additional producer.
- ^{^[b]} signifies a co-producer.

== Personnel ==
- Alicia N. Graham – A&R administrator
- Anthony Kilhoffer – assistant recording (track 4)
- Atan Ayoub – guitar (track 3)
- Beau Dozier – producer (track 6)
- Daniel Carlisle – main artist, producer (tracks: 7–8, 11), additional production (track 12), drum programming (tracks: 7–8), keyboards (track 7)
- Dave Press – drums (tracks: 8, 12)
- Dave "Supa Star" Dar – additional recording (track 4)
- Devon Dowdell – featured artist (track 12)
- Elliot Blakey – assistant recording (track 4)
- Evan Peters – A&R coordinator
- Greg Calbi – mastering
- Jermaine Harbin – additional vocals (track 5)
- Jordan Schur – executive producer
- Julian Bunetta – producer, recording & mixing (tracks: 1–2, 4–6, 9, 11)
- Kai Regan – photography
- Kaya Jones – background vocals (track 4)
- Luis Resto – additional production & keyboards (tracks: 3, 10)
- Marshall Mathers – guest artist (track 10), producer & mixing (tracks: 3, 10)
- Mike Strange – recording (tracks: 3, 10)
- Nathaniel Dwayne Hale – featured artist (track 3)
- Neal Ferrazzani – additional recording (track 3)
- Ondre Moore – featured artist (track 10)
- Phil Campbell – additional guitar (track 12)
- Randy Lynch – co-producer & bass (tracks: 7–8), guitar (tracks: 7–8, 12)
- Rufus Johnson – featured artist (track 6)
- Salim Grant – background vocals (track 9)
- Scott Sumner – co-producer & keyboards (tracks: 7–8), recording
- Steve King – bass & mixing (tracks: 3, 10), guitar (track 10)
- Talib Kweli Greene – featured artist (track 4)
- Thom Panunzio – A&R, mixing (tracks: 7–8, 12), additional production & recording (track 12)
- Tony Compana – recording (tracks: 3, 10)
- Von Carlisle – featured artist (track 10)
- Lo-Down – featured artist (track 12)
- Notes – producer (track 12)

== Charts ==
Chart (2005)	Peak position
US Top R&B/Hip-Hop Albums (Billboard)	83
US Heatseekers Albums (Billboard)	39
