= The Entity (album) =

Studio album by King Gordy
- Released: June 24, 2003
- Studio: 54 Sound (Ferndale, MI)
- Genre: Underground hip hop; horrorcore
- Length: 51:57
- Label: Web Entertainment
- Producer: 0-1; Bass Brothers (exec.); Blitz; Cysion; Eminem; Hex Murda; Konphlict; Luis Resto; Mike Strange; Ray Gale; Silent Riot; Steve King; The 45 King; Wayne Gerard

King Gordy chronology
The Entity (2003)	King of Horrorcore (2006)

Singles from The Entity
- 1. "The Pain" Released: May 6, 2003

The Entity is the debut album by American underground rapper King Gordy. It was released on June 24, 2003 via Web Entertainment. The record featured guest appearances by the likes of fellow Detroit-based rappers Bizarre, Obie Trice, and the Fat Killahz. The audio production was handled by Eminem, Luis Resto, The 45 King, the Almighty Dreadnaughtz (0-1, Blitz, Cysion, Hex Murda, Konphlict), and Bass Brothers (among others), who also served as executive producers of the album.

Gordy released a music video for the song "Nightmares".

Professional ratings
Review scores
Source	Rating
RapReviews	7/10 stars

== Track listing ==
The Entity
No.	Title	Producer(s)	Length
1.	"The Entity"	Hex Murda; Mike Strange	0:55
2.	"Nightmares"	Bass Brothers; Eminem; Luis Resto^{[a]}	2:41
3.	"The Pain"	Bass Brothers; Eminem; Luis Resto^{[a]}	4:02
4.	"Fight"	Bass Brothers; Konphlict^{[b]}	3:30
5.	"Situations" (featuring Obie Trice)	Steve King; Cysion^{[b]}	3:22
6.	"When Darkness Falls"	Bass Brothers; Eminem	4:27
7.	"Playground" (Skit)	Hex Murda	0:59
8.	"Time To Die" (featuring Bizarre)	0-1	4:10
9.	"Fat-Tastic 4" (featuring The Fat Killahz)	Steve King; Silent Riot^{[b]}	4:48
10.	"Pass Me A Lighter"	Bass Brothers; Eminem; Steve King^{[a]}; Ray Gale^{[a]}; Luis Resto^{[a]}	3:34
11.	"No Lights"	Bass Brothers	3:13
12.	"We Violent"	Bass Brothers	3:30
13.	"The Mask" (featuring Sindee Syringe)	Blitz; Steve King^{[b]}	4:08
14.	"Hello Gordy..." (Skit)		0:22
15.	"Stress" (featuring Sal)	Mark Bass; Wayne Gerard^{[a]}	3:56
16.	"Nobody Hates Nothin'"	The 45 King; Luis Resto^{[b]}	4:20
Total length:			51:57

Notes

- ^{^[a]} signifies an additional producer.
- ^{^[b]} signifies a co-producer.

== Personnel ==
Adapted from AllMusic.

- Jeff Bass – bass, engineer, executive producer, guitar, keyboards, producer
- Mark Bass – A&R, executive producer, mixing, producer
- Akane Behrens – engineer
- Rick Behrens – engineer
- Cysion – producer
- Shabazz Ford – rap vocals
- Andy Gallacher – vocals
- Brian "Big Bass" Gardner – mastering
- Eugene Howell – A&R, producer
- Richard Hunt – assistant engineer
- Rufus Johnson – rap vocals
- Steve King – bass, engineer, guitar, mixing, producer
- Joel Martin – A&R, executive producer
- Luis Resto – keyboards, producer
- Konnie Ross – producer
- Shim-E-Bango – rap vocals
- Silent Riot – producer
- Michael Strange Jr. – engineer, mixing, producer
- Obie Trice – featured artist
- Shaphan "Maestro" Williams – vocals
- Marv Won – rap vocals
- 0–1 – producer
- Waverly W. Alford III – rap vocals
- Marshall Mathers – producer on tracks 2, 3, 6, 10

Additional musicians

- Brandy Nicole Ellis – background vocals on track 6
- Jennifer Bostick – background vocals on track 16
- Ray Gale – harmonica on track 10
- Salvador Tempo – additional vocals on track 15
- Stephani Singleton – background vocals on track 16
- Wayne Gerard – producer, guitar on track 15
