= Blue Cheese & Coney Island =

Studio album by Bizarre
- Released: October 9, 2007
- Recorded: 2006–07
- Genre: Hip-hop
- Length: 1:01:38
- Label: Koch
- Producers: A Piece of Strange; Alphabet; Dub Muzik; Jake Bass; K.I.D.D.; Laidback; Nick Speed; Rencen; Seige Monstracity; Silent Riot

Bizarre chronology
Hannicap Circus (2005)	Blue Cheese & Coney Island (2007)	Friday Night at St. Andrews (2010)

Singles from Blue Cheese & Coney Island
- 1. "Fat Boy" Released: 2007; 2. "So Hard" Released: 2007

Professional ratings
Review scores
Source	Rating
AllMusic	3.5/5 stars
RapReviews	7.5/10
XXL	2/5 (M)

Blue Cheese & Coney Island is the second solo studio album by American rapper Bizarre. It was released on October 9, 2007 via Koch Records. Production was handled by DubMuzik, Kidd, Rencen, Silent Riot, A Piece of Strange, Alphabet, Jake Bass, Nick Speed, Laidback and Seige. It features guest appearances from King Gordy, K.B., Monica Blaire, 7 Nation, DubMuzik, Gam, Kuniva, Maestro, Razzaq, Scarchild, Tech N9ne, Twiztid and Young Miles.

== Track listing ==
No.	Title	Writer(s)	Producer(s)	Length
1.	"Rock Out" (featuring King Gordy)	Rufus Johnson; Waverly Alford; Nick Speed	Nick Speed	3:38
2.	"Knock 'Em Out" (featuring King Gordy and Tech N9ne)	Johnson; Alford; Aaron Yates; Torrey T. Holloway; Quentin Vonzell King	DubMuzik	3:39
3.	"So Hard" (featuring Monica Blaire)	Johnson; Blaire White; Brian Allen Braceful	Silent Riot	3:49
4.	"Sex Tape"	Johnson; Holloway	DubMuzik	2:39
5.	"Animal" (featuring King Gordy and Razaaq)	Johnson; Alford; Abdur-Razzaq Abdur-Rahim; Donald Wayne Melson	Alphabet	3:59
6.	"How I Hustle" (featuring 7 Nation and K.B.)	Johnson; Kevin Brown; Willie H. Reed Jr.	K.I.D.D.	4:23
7.	"Welcome 2 the D" (featuring Young Miles, Kuniva and Stretch Money)	Johnson; M. Hampton; Von Carlisle; Reed Jr.	K.I.D.D.	4:45
8.	"Get This Money" (featuring Maestro)	Johnson; Shaphan Williams; Braceful	Silent Riot	2:51
9.	"Got This Addiction"	Johnson; Q. Hickerson	Rencen	3:04
10.	"Wicked" (featuring Twiztid)	Johnson; Paul Methric; Jamie Spaniolo; Alford; Hickerson	Rencen	4:06
11.	"She's Homeless"	Johnson; Reed Jr.	K.I.D.D.	3:02
12.	"Start a Mosh Pit"	Johnson; Q. King	Laidback	3:35
13.	"Cakin'" (featuring DubMuzik, Gam, Scarchild and King Gordy)	Johnson; Holloway; L. King; Joe Hill; Alford; Ryan Wisler; Willis Polk II	A Piece of Strange	5:29
14.	"G-14"	Johnson; Holloway; Q. King	DubMuzik	3:41
15.	"Da Fat Boy Dance" (featuring K.B.)	Johnson; Brown; Marcus White	Seige	5:05
16.	"Fat Boy" (featuring King Gordy)	Johnson; Alford; Jacob Bass	Jake Bass	3:53
Total length:				1:01:38

== Singles ==
- "Fat Boy" (featuring King Gordy)
- "So Hard" (featuring Monica Blair)
- "Animal" (featuring King Gordy and Razaaq)
