= Friday Night at St. Andrews =

Studio album by Bizarre
- Released: May 18, 2010
- Recorded: 2008–2010
- Genre: Midwest hip hop; horrorcore
- Length: 71:11
- Label: AVJ
- Producer: Bizarre (exec.); Jason M. Brown (exec.); Shannon Houchins (exec.); Ahmed Oliver; Bus & Napoleon; Calvo Da Gr8; Cutmaster Swiff; Honorable C.N.O.T.E.; J. Wells; Nick Kage; Panama; Silent Riot; The North Starz; Vance Hornbuckle; Walt Q-Sick; Witt; WLPWR

Bizarre chronology
Blue Cheese & Coney Island (2007)	Friday Night at St. Andrews (2010)	Rufus (2019)

Singles from Friday Night at St. Andrews
- 1. "Believer" Released: March 10, 2010; 2. "Rap's Finest" Released: April 6, 2010

Friday Night at St. Andrews (originally named Live from St. Andrews) is the third solo studio album by American rapper Bizarre. It was released on May 18, 2010 through AVJ Records. Production was handled by several record producers, including Bus & Napoleon, Honorable C.N.O.T.E., Silent Riot, J. Wells and WLPWR. It features guest appearances from King Gordy, Monica Braire, Anamul House, Big Dame, Bonecrusher, Fiona Simone, K.B., Kid Jinx, Kuniva, Lil' Will, MJ Robinson, Nate Walka, Riodata, Royce Da 5'9", Seven the General, Tech N9NE and Yelawolf. Music videos were released for the songs "Believer", "Rap's Finest" and "Down This Road".

== Background ==
Bizarre stated that his third album release would not be like his two previous albums, as it would focus less on humour and more on lyrical ability. He decided this because many people looked at Bizarre as not being a serious emcee and the fact that D12 continued to make comical music after the death of group member, Proof. Bizarre stated that production for the album would be done by lesser known, Detroit-based producers.

I just really want to take it back to the days of the Attack of the Weirdos days... Let everybody know that, ya know, Bizarre will shit on you, and that Bizarre got the sick, ill lyrics". — Bizarre

== Title meaning ==
The meaning behind the title name "Friday Night at St. Andrews" has a significance in what Bizarre is trying to do with this album. Bizarre described the area of St. Andrews as once being a place where only "weirdos" would go to see hip hop acts on Friday nights.

St. Andrews is the venue all the hip hop heads went to on Fridays for music. There were other clubs around it, but it stood out like a sore thumb. The people who went there used to look so different. People used to laugh at you for going there". — Bizarre

St. Andrews now has a reputation as one of Detroit's biggest mainstays for live music in general. Bizarre states that's he is on a mission to undergo a similar transformation with this album.

I'm bringing it back to the raw hip hop with this album. I came up from battling, but people got me misconstrued because of some of my lyrics and didn't consider me a dope MC. I wouldn't say that I'm toning my music down, but I'm definitely being more lyrical this time around". — Bizarre

== Reception ==
Professional ratings
Review scores
Source	Rating
HipHopDX	1.5/5 stars
Hip Hop Wired	3.5/5 stars
RapReviews	5/10
ThaCorner	1.5/5 stars

Reviews for the album have been mainly negative. Luke Gibson of HipHopDX gave the album 1 and a half out of 5 stars and wrote that "While Bizarre is a grizzled veteran and strange has a market to sell, it has to be done in a convincing manner. Bizarre is unable to do this on Friday Night at St. Andrews, and even though the album is blessed with solid production, it is ultimately a failure".

A song on the album which was generally targeted by many reviewers was the song "I Love The Babies" for the fact that the song makes fun of pedophilia. HipHopDX wrote that "Over the course of the album, he talks about taking every drug known to man, sexing plenty of women - and on “I Love The Babies”, it's, well, just disturbing. The Detroit native understands that humor is part of his draw and like any controversial comedian, he pushes the limits. Unfortunately pedophilia is one of those unaccepted areas of humor, and listeners are left feeling uncomfortable".

== Track listing ==
No.	Title	Producer(s)	Length
1.	"Friday Night At St. Andrews" (Intro)	Bus; Napoleon Pierre	2:33
2.	"Here We Go (Off da Chain)"	Calvo Da Gr8	4:06
3.	"Fat Father" (Skit)		1:28
4.	"Some Days" (featuring Lil' Will)		4:23
5.	"Pussy" (featuring Fiona Simone and K.B.)	Honorable C.N.O.T.E.	5:38
6.	"Rap's Finest" (featuring Kuniva, Seven the General and Royce Da 5'9")	The North Starz	4:41
7.	"School Teacher" (featuring Riodata and Kid Jinx)	J. Wells	3:31
8.	"Smoking Crack"	Nick Kage	3:52
9.	"Down This Road" (featuring Yelawolf)	WLPWR	3:39
10.	"Believer" (featuring Tech N9NE and Nate Walka)	Honorable C.N.O.T.E.	4:18
11.	"Whatcha Smokin' On" (featuring King Gordy)	Vance Hornbuckle; Panama; Ahmed Oliver	4:39
12.	"Wild Like Us" (featuring King Gordy)	Walt Q-Sick	4:31
13.	"I Love the Babies"	Bus; Napoleon Pierre	4:06
14.	"The Fan" (Skit)		1:00
15.	"Rock It Out" (featuring King Gordy)	Bus; Napoleon Pierre	3:36
16.	"Warning" (featuring Bonecrusher and Anamul House)	Honorable C.N.O.T.E.	4:09
17.	"Emotions" (featuring Monica Blaire)	Silent Riot	4:02
18.	"Can't Get Enough" (featuring MJ Robinson and Big Dame)	Silent Riot	3:47
19.	"You Gotta Believe It" (featuring Monica Blaire)	Honorable C.N.O.T.E.	4:16
Total length:			71:11

== Personnel ==
- Rufus Johnson – primary artist, producer, executive producer
- Waverly Walter Alford III – featured artist (tracks: 11, 12, 15)
- Blaire White – featured artist (tracks: 17, 19)
- Shaphan "Maestro" Williams – featured artist (track 14), producer
- Shabazz Ford – featured artist (track 3)
- Willie J. Ray III – featured artist (track 4)
- Kevin Brown – featured artist (track 5)
- Fiona Simone – featured artist (track 5)
- Von Carlisle – featured artist (track 6)
- Ryan Daniel Montgomery – featured artist (track 6)
- Burke "Seven The General" Bardwell – featured artist (track 6)
- Mario Butterfield – featured artist (track 7)
- Kid Jinx – featured artist (track 7)
- Michael Wayne Atha – featured artist (track 9)
- Aaron Dontez Yates – featured artist (track 10)
- Nathan L. Walker – featured artist (track 10)
- Denisha Matthews – featured artist (track 14)
- Wayne Hardnett – featured artist (track 16)
- "Jabba Jaw" Brian Mason – featured artist (track 16)
- Derek "Scramn" Golsby – featured artist (track 16)
- Damien Pittman – featured artist (track 18)
- M.J. Robinson – featured artist (track 18)
- Ahmed Oliver – producer
- Yves "Bus The Producer" Bazelais Jr. – producer
- Calvo Da Gr8 – producer
- Carlton Davis Mays, Jr. – producer
- DJ Cutmaster Swiff – producer
- Jon Wells – producer
- Napoleon Jerry Pierre – producer
- Nick Kage – producer
- Panama – producer
- Vance Hornbuckle – producer, engineering
- Walt Q-Sick – producer, mixing
- Dewitt "Witt" Moore – producer
- William Washington – producer
- Shannon "Fat Shan" Houchins – executive producer
- Jason "Boogie" Brown – executive producer, A&R
- John "Blue" Allen – engineering, A&R coordinator
- Mike Morris – guitar (track 12)
- Juan Garcia – bass
- Preston "P Groover" Crump – bass
- Omar Philips – percussion
- Tim "Herb" Alexander – programming
- I.V. Duncan – engineering, mixing
- Kevin Parker – engineering
- Londell "Diszazta" Williamson – engineering
- Ronald "Caveman" Rosario – engineering
- Jeff Tomei – mixing
- Josh Butler – mixing
- Randall "RBL" Lumpkin – mastering, mixing
- A. Alexander – composer
- Rob Petrozzo – creative director
- Diwang Valdez – photography
- Tresa Sanders – publicity
- Jason Wagner – media consultant
