= Hush (rapper) =

American rapper

- Born: Daniel Carlisle; August 13, 1972 (age 53)
- Origin: Detroit, Michigan, US
- Genres: Hip hop; rap rock
- Occupations: Rapper; record producer; songwriter; actor
- Years active: 1991–present
- Labels: Geffen Records; Restraining Order; Danny Boy Records
- Website: Twitter

Daniel Carlisle (born August 13, 1972 in Detroit, Michigan), professionally known by his stage name Hush, is an American rapper, record producer, songwriter and actor of Italian and Lebanese descent. He was signed to Area Code Management and DTW Records, but left for Geffen Records to release his 2005 major label debut album Bulletproof.

== Career ==
Daniel "Hush" Carlisle and Jermaine "Uncle Ill" Harbin formed Da Ruckus and the duo was signed to Federation Records after success of their 1997 independent release Quiet As Kept. They released Episode 1 EP in 1998 featuring guest appearances from D12 Members Eye-Kyu, Bizarre Kid, Swifty McVay and Eminem. It reached the Top Ten Independent albums in 1997. Da Ruckus opened for Kid Rock in 1998.

In 1999 Da Rukus released their last Ep Bootlegs & B sides The Lost Episode. The album features guest appearances from D12 members Mr. Porter, Eye-Kyu, Kuniva, Swifty McVay, Bizarre Kid, and Detroit rapper Paradime. After Da Ruckus split in early 2000s, Hush released his first solo album There Goes The Neighborhood in 1999 and his sophomore record Roses & Razorblades in 2002.

In spring 2005, Hush released his major single "Hush is Coming" which featured Nate Dogg. The video had appearances by Eminem, Obie Trice, Swifty McVay and Omar Cruz. That same spring, Hush was included on the soundtrack for ×X×: State of the Union with his song "The March". Hush released his third record Bulletproof via Geffen Records on August 23, 2005. It featured a list of star guest appearances including two-thirds of D12 (except Kon Artis and Proof), Nate Dogg and Talib Kweli. Later that fall, a clean version of Hush's song "Fired Up" was featured on the soundtrack for the Need for Speed: Most Wanted video game. The "Fired up" song reached millions of views on YouTube and other internet platforms in connection with the popular video game.

He went independent to release his fourth album The Open Book in 2009, a much more legitimate edgy rap/rock hybrid compared to any of his prior work. Chino XL, Marv Won and Quest M.C.O.D.Y. served as only guest starts on the record. Hush has won nine Detroit Music Awards for Outstanding Hip-Hop Artist/Group and Outstanding Hip-Hop/Rap MC/composer.

His fifth solo album, titled Danny Boy (The Life & Times of a Kid in the D), was released on October 14, 2014, via his own Danny Boy Records label, and features fellow Detroit-based artist such as Dwele, Melanie Rutherford, T3, Marv Won, Cadillac Dale and Monica Blaire.

== Other activities ==
In 2010, Hush was approached by Monica Martino and asked to be a part of her Discovery Channel series "A Dogs Life", which was later shut down by the city. In February 2011, the two founded a group called Detroit Dog Rescue to raise money for animal shelters and to help bring stray dogs off the streets of Detroit. They began to raise funds for Detroit's first no-kill animal shelter, as well as placing abused, unwanted or abandoned dogs. The group also involves and educates the community about the problem of stray dogs in Detroit.

In June 2015, Hush left the group to further pursue his musical career. He stated in a Facebook post: "My time has come to move on from Detroit Dog Rescue and try new things. I had never thought I would have been a part of something so groundbreaking, but for what I was able to accomplish in the 4 years, I am very proud."

== Hush band members line-up ==
- Current members
  - Hush - Vocals, production
- Former members
  - Mike "Seven" Martinez - Vocals
  - Cadillac Dale - Vocals
  - Cyamak Ashtiani - Guitar
  - Kyle Palermino - Guitar
  - Shance Carlisle - Bass
  - David Press - Drums
  - Aaron Berch - Keyboards
  - Wally Filipiak - Guitar
  - Craig "Spider" White - Bass
  - Paul Cramer - Drums
  - DJ Invisible - Turntables

== Discography ==
=== Albums ===
- There Goes The Neighborhood (2000)
- Roses & Razorblades (2002)
- Bulletproof (2005)
- The Open Book (2009)
- Danny Boy: The Life & Times of a Kid in the D (2014)
- Souvenirs & Scraps (2023)

=== Collaborative albums ===
- Quiet As Kept (with Uncle Ill, as Da Ruckus) (1997)
- Episode 1 (EP) (with Uncle Ill, as Da Ruckus) (1998)
- The Collaborations Feat. Cadillac Dale (2017)
- Da Unreleased Episode (with Uncle Ill, as Da Ruckus) (2022)
- 712313 Feat. Bobby J From Rockaway (2022)

=== Singles ===
- "Fired Up" (2005)
- "Put 'Em Down" (2005)
- "Hush Is Coming" (2005)
- "Rise Again" (2009)
- "Forgive Me" (2009)
- "C Me Flowing" (2009)
- "Evil Minds" (2010)
- "Y.O.U." (2017)
- "Let's Get Back 2 Us Feat. T3 of Slum Village" (2018)
- "Batter Up (Who Want It Mix)" (2018)
- "From The Start Feat. Bobby J From Rockaway" (2019)
- "Monsters Are Due On Maple Street Feat. Bobby J From Rockaway" (2020)
- "Fired Up (Plah's Need For Speed Remix)" (2020)
- "People Feat. Bobby J From Rockaway" (2022)
- "Sometimes Feat. Bobby J From Rockaway" (2022)
- "People Feat. Bobby J From Rockaway" (2022)
- "Knuckle Up Feat. Royce Da 5'9"" (2022)
- "Girls Feat. Bobby J From Rockaway & Paradime" (2022)
- "The Truest Feat. Guilty Simpson, Marv Won, Daru Jones, DJ Don Q & Bobby J From Rockaway" (2022)
- "Livin' This Lifetime Feat. Ro Spit, D.L. Jones, & Bobby J From Rockaway" (2022)
- "KOLM Feat. Trick Trick, Goodmoney G 100 & Bobby J From Rockaway" (2022)
- "Pain Feat. Cadillac Dale & Bobby J From Rockaway" (2025)

== Awards and nominations ==
Year	Nominee / work	Award	Result	Ref.
2009	Himself	Detroit Music Award for Outstanding Hip-Hop Artist / Group	Won	
2009	Himself	Detroit Music Award for Outstanding Hip-Hop MC	Won	
2010	Himself	Detroit Music Award for Outstanding Hip-Hop MC	Won	
2012	Himself	Detroit Music Award for Outstanding Hip-Hop Artist/Group	Won	
2012	Himself	Detroit Music Award for Outstanding Hip-Hop MC	Won	
2013	Himself	Detroit Music Award for Outstanding Hip-Hop MC	Won	
2015	Himself	Detroit Music Award for Outstanding Rap MC	Won	
2016	Himself	Detroit Music Award for Outstanding Rap Composer	Won	
2017	Himself	Detroit Music Award for Outstanding Rap MC	Won	
2019	Himself	Detroit Music Award for Outstanding Rap Composer	Nominated	
2019	Himself	Detroit Music Award for Outstanding Rap Producer	Nominated	
