= Searching for Jerry Garcia =

Studio album by Proof
- Released: August 9, 2005
- Recorded: 2002–2005
- Genres: Hip-hop; hardcore hip hop
- Length: 67:37
- Label: Iron Fist
- Producers: David Michery (exec.); B.R. Gunna; B-Real; Dirty Bird; Emile; Eminem; Essman; Fredwreck; Jewels; Mr. Porter; Nick Speed; Salam Wreck; Ski; Witt & Pep; Young RJ

Proof chronology
Grown Man Shit (2005)	Searching for Jerry Garcia (2005)	Hand2Hand: The Official Mixtape Instruction Manual (2006)

Professional ratings
Review scores
Source	Rating
AllMusic	3.5/5 stars
The Situation	4/5 stars
NME	7/10 stars
HipHopDX.com	3.5/5 stars
RapReviews.com	8/10 stars

Searching for Jerry Garcia is the only studio album by Detroit rapper and D12 member Proof. It was released on August 9, 2005, through his own independent label, Iron Fist Records. The album is named after Grateful Dead member Jerry Garcia, with its release date intentionally coinciding with the ten-year anniversary of Garcia's death.

== Background ==
Proof found inspiration in an unlikely person — the late jam rocker Jerry Garcia, saying to Rolling Stone Magazine: "I was watching Searching for Bobby Fischer and Mark Hicks (D12's manager) put in a Jerry Garcia documentary. In this movie, he talked about never doing the same show twice. I did that to D12 sets overseas. Plus, he didn't care about record sales — he just wanted to make fans happy."

"I called his estate, and I couldn't believe they gave me permission [to use the name]!" says the rapper. "They didn't ask for money. So I'm like a disciple, preaching the gospel of Jerry Garcia. The dude is phenomenal."

The album's artwork includes multiple homages to Garcia, one of which is the cover featuring a skeleton, a common motif on Grateful Dead album covers. Another is found in the inner artwork, where one image depicts Proof partly skinned amid roses, drawing inspiration from E. J. Sullivan's 1900 drawing, A Skeleton Amid Roses, which appears on the Grateful Dead's self-titled 1971 album and merchandise.

In addition to Garcia, Proof pays homage to Nirvana's late frontman, Kurt Cobain, on the album's closing track, deliberately titled "Kurt Kobain". The song is a rap in the form of a suicide note, which is also reflected on the album's inner artwork. "The circumstances of Kurt's death are freaky to me. I don't think he killed himself," Proof says. "But I'm not trying to keep Elvis alive, and I'm not saying that Tupac is in Cuba." Proof's thoughts on the conspiracy that Cobain was murdered echo through the songs outro, where, after seemingly shooting himself in the head, Proof repeatedly whispers, "Love killed me", serving as a nod to the popular theory that Cobain's wife, Courtney Love, murdered him. Proof also references the singer's death at the end of the album's opening song, "Clap Wit Me".

Death is a running theme throughout the album. In the interlude "When God Calls," Proof is depicted as being killed, which is followed by the song "Forgive Me," where he confesses his sins to God. Other references on the album involving the death of musicians include numerous references to Bugz, the late former member of D12, joining 2Pac in heaven, the murder of John Lennon, and artwork paying tribute to members of the 27 Club. Less than a year after the album's release, on April 11, 2006, Proof was shot to death in his hometown in Detroit. The album includes his final song with Eminem and D12, "Pimplikeness."

Some songs on the album were recorded as early as 2002, with most being completed in 2004 and 2005. A bonus DVD titled High World was released with the limited-edition version of the album, featuring unreleased footage from D12's 2004 European Tour, a behind-the-scenes look at the making of the song "High Rollers," and cameos from D12, Obie Trice, Busta Rhymes, B-Real, King Gordy, and Method Man."

== Commercial performance ==
It debuted at number 65 on the U.S. Billboard 200 Albums Chart.

== Track listing ==
No.	Title	Writer(s)	Producer(s)	Length
1.	"Knice" (Intro)			1:22
2.	"Clap Wit Me" (featuring Brief Encounter)	DeShaun Holton; Emile Haynie	Emile	2:41
3.	"Biboa's Theme"	Holton; Nicholas Speed	Nick Speed	3:11
4.	"When God Calls..." (Skit)			0:29
5.	"Forgive Me" (featuring 50 Cent)	Holton; Curtis Jackson; C. Conley; L. Louis; Bryan Johnson; Dewitt Moore	Witt & Pep	4:12
6.	"Purple Gang"	Holton; Curtis Cross; T. Farris; L. Fisher; R.J. Rice, Jr.; M. Thomas	B.R. Gunna	3:36
7.	"Nat Morris" (Skit)			0:34
8.	"Gurls Wit' Da Boom"	Holton; Cross; R.J. Rice, Jr.	Young RJ	4:01
9.	"High Rollers" (featuring B-Real and Method Man)	Holton; Louis Freese; Clifford Smith	B-Real	3:40
10.	"Rondell Beene" (Skit)			1:20
11.	"Pimplikeness" (featuring D12)	Holton; Von Carlisle; Ondre Moore; Marshall Mathers; Rufus Johnson; Farid Nassar	Fredwreck	5:10
12.	"Ali" (featuring MC Breed)	Holton; Eric Breed; A. Fiddler; Shelton Rivers	Essman	3:38
13.	"No. T. Lose" (featuring King Gordy)	Holton; Waverly Alford; J. Myers; S. Williams	Jewels	3:30
14.	"Jump Biatch"	Holton; David Willis	Ski	3:34
15.	"M.A.D." (featuring Rude Jude)	Holton; Salam Nassar	Salam Wreck	3:26
16.	"72nd & Central" (featuring Obie Trice and J-Hill)	Holton; Obie Trice; J. Hill; Rivers	Essman	4:53
17.	"Sammy Da Bull" (featuring Nate Dogg and Swifty McVay)	Holton; O. Moore; Nathaniel Hale; B. Parrott	Dirty Bird	4:48
18.	"Black Wrist Bro's" (featuring 1st Born)	Holton; C. Conley; C. Hurd; J. Myers	Jewels	3:22
19.	"Slum Elementz" (featuring T3 of Slum Village and Mudd of 5 Elementz)	Holton; Denaun Porter; R.L. Altman; Reginald Moore	Mr. Porter	3:57
20.	"Kurt Kobain"	Holton; Haynie	Emile	4:50

=== Notes ===
- "Clap Wit Me" contains a sample of "Total Satisfaction" by Brief Encounter. The original version was released in 2003 on a mixtape by DJ Thoro
- Although credited as featuring on "Forgive Me", 50 Cent's vocals are a sample taken from the song "Ghetto Qu'ran (Forgive Me)"
- "High Rollers" contains a sample of "Don't Stop Loving Me Now" by LTD
- The "Rondell Beene" skit is performed by Kuniva of D12
- Mr. Porter is the only member of D12 not to appear on the song "Pimplikeness"
- "Ali" was previously released in 2002, under the name "One, Two", on the vinyl EP Electric Coolaid Acid Testing
- "No. T. Lose" contains a sample of "Snowflake" by Tamita
- "M.A.D." contains a sample of "W.A.S.P." by The Doors. It also references "The Dope Show" by Marilyn Manson
- The original version of "72nd & Central" was available to download for free in 2002, under the title "1x1", on Proof's official site.
- "Black Wrist Bro's" contains a sample taken from the motion picture The Boondock Saints
- "Slum Elementz" contains uncredited vocals from D12's Mr. Porter
- "Kurt Kobain" contains a sample of "Blue Sky and Silver Bird" by Lamont Dozier

=== Personnel ===
- DeShaun Holton – vocals, songwriter
- Brian Gardner – mastering engineer
- Gustavo Gonzalez – engineer (assistant) on tracks 5–6, 11 and 14
- Jeremy Mackenzie – engineer (assistant) on tracks 2, 8, 11 and 19
- Richard Huredia – mixer on tracks 2, 3, 5–6, 8–9 and 11–20
- Brian Berryman – recorder on tracks 2, 6, 8–9, 15 and 17–20
- Jared Gosslin – recorder on tracks 12–13, 16 and 20
- Tony Campana – recorder on tracks 3, 5, 11–13, 15 and 17–18
- Dennis Friel – package art and design
- Mark Riddle – package art and design
- Emile Haynie – producer on tracks 2 and 20
- Nick Speed – producer on track 3
- Curtis Jackson – guest vocals on track 5
- Larry Louis – bass on track 5
- Chaz Conley – keyboards on tracks 5 and 18
- Curtis Cross – producer on track 6 and 8
- Louis Freese – producer and guest vocals on track 9
- Clifford Smith – guest vocals on track 9
- Marshall Mathers – producer and mixer on track 1 and guest vocals on track 11
- Von Carlisle – guest vocals on track 11
- Ondre Moore – guest vocals on tracks 11 and 17
- Rufus Johnson – guest vocals on track 11
- Erik Coomes – guitars and bass on track 11
- Kamasi Washington – saxophone on track 11
- Isaac Smith – trombone on track 11
- Josef Leimberg – trumpet on track 11
- Traci Nelson – additional vocals on track 11
- Farid Nassar – producer on track 11 and keyboards on track 15
- Eric Breed – guest vocals on track 12
- Anthony Fiddler – keyboards and co-producer on track 12
- Shelton Rivers – producer on tracks 12 and 16
- Waverly Alford – guest vocals on track 13
- Shaphan Williams – additional keyboards on track 13
- David Willis – producer on track 14
- Jude Angelini – guest vocals on track 15
- Salam Nassar – producer on track 15 and recorder on track 19
- Obie Trice – guest vocals on track 16
- Jimmy Hill - guest vocals on track 16 and co recorder
- Nathaniel Hale – guest vocals on track 17
- Brandon "Dirty Bird" Parrott – producer on track 17
- Denaun Porter – producer and guest vocals on track 19

== Chart history ==
Chart (2005)	Peak position
US Billboard 200	65
US Independent Albums (Billboard)	8
US Top R&B/Hip-Hop Albums (Billboard)	33
US Top Rap Albums (Billboard)	16
