= I Miss the Hip Hop Shop =

Mixtape by Proof
- Released: June 15, 2004
- Recorded: 2002–2004
- Genre: Underground hip hop
- Length: 58:40
- Label: Iron Fist
- Producers: Cyzer Soset; Witt & Pep; Reef; DJ HouseShoes; DJ Premier; J Dilla; Mr. Porter; Amp Fiddler; Kareem Riggins; Essman; Stacey; Davina

Proof chronology
D12 World (2004)	I Miss the Hip Hop Shop (2004)	Searchin' For Jerry Garcia (2005)

Professional ratings
Review scores
Source	Rating
RapReviews.com	(7/10) link

I Miss the Hip Hop Shop is a mixtape by Detroit rapper Proof, released on June 15, 2004, via Iron Fist Records.

== Diss track ==
One of the most notable tracks is "Ja in a Bra", a diss track to rapper Ja Rule which is a response to Ja Rule dissing Proof in his diss track "The Wrap (Freestyle)" where Ja Rule raps "He's like baby can you give it to me, nah, I'ma give it to you, the same way that we gave it to 'Proof', the same way that we gave it to 'Loose'". Ja Rule had also dissed Proof in his diss track "It's Murda (Freestyle)" where Ja Rule raps "Y'all haven't heard yet that nigga change is 'Loose' and I got 'Proof' get it, I got 'Proof'". The track list was printed wrong on the album, with tracks 8 and 9 being interchanged.

== Track listing ==
No.	Title	Producer(s)	Length
1.	"Intro"		1:05
2.	"E and 1 Equal None"	Kareem Riggins	2:54
3.	"Yzark"	Essman	3:52
4.	"Derty Harry"	Cyzer Soset	3:39
5.	"People Hi for Change"	Amp Fiddler; Greg C. Brown	2:04
6.	"Neil Armstrong"	Cyzer Soset	4:23
7.	"Broken" (featuring Journalist & MU)	House Shoes	4:24
8.	"Shake Dat Donkey"	Cyzer Soset	3:30
9.	"Runnin' Yo! Mouth" (featuring T-Flame & Fatt Father)	Stacey	3:58
10.	"Skit-Dolo Speaks 2"		1:16
11.	"Know Ya! Name" (featuring 1st Born)	Davina	2:45
12.	"Play with Myself"	DJ Premier	2:37
13.	"You Know How 2" (featuring Famous)	Kon Artis	3:29
14.	"It Ain't About Tha"	Sicknotes	2:43
15.	"Cross tha' Line"	Reef	3:00
16.	"Bring It 2 Me" (featuring Killa Khann)	J Dilla	3:10
17.	"Ja in a Bra'"	Sicknotes	3:39
18.	"Nowhere Fast" (featuring Dogmatic)	Sicknotes	3:21
19.	"Love Letters"	DJ DDT-Da Busta	2:56
Total length:			58:40

== Reviews ==
- "Proof :: I Miss the Hip Hop Shop :: Iron Fist Records". www.rapreviews.com.
