= Hannicap Circus =

Studio album by Bizarre
- Released: June 28, 2005
- Recorded: 2004–05
- Studio: Little Big Room Studios (North Hollywood, CA); Area 51 (Detroit and Farmington Hills, MI); 54 Sound (Detroit and Ferndale, MI); Teklab Studios (Cincinnati, OH); FBT Studios (Ferndale, MI); Blakeslee Recording Company (North Hollywood, CA)
- Genre: Hip hop
- Length: 1:06:45
- Label: Sanctuary Urban
- Producer: Bizarre (exec.); Jeremy Geffen (exec.); Max Gousse (exec.); Mathew Knowles (exec.); Eminem; Erick Sermon; Hi-Tek; J Thrill; Jake and the Phatman; Luis Resto; Mike Chav; Mr. Porter; Raphael Saadiq; Ruk; Shea; Sicknotes; Silent Riot; Sol Messiah; TNyce

Bizarre chronology
Attack of the Weirdos (1997)	Hannicap Circus (2005)	Blue Cheese & Coney Island (2007)

Singles from Hannicap Circus
- 1. "Rockstar" Released: June 20, 2005

Hannicap Circus is the debut solo studio album by American rapper Bizarre. It was released on June 28, 2005 via Sanctuary Urban. Production was handled by several record producers, including Hi-Tek, Mr. Porter, Eminem and Erick Sermon. It features guest appearances from D12, Young Miles, Big Boi, Devin the Dude, Dion Jenkins, Fatt Father, King Gordy, Obie Trice, Raphael Saadiq, stic.man, Sindee Syringe, and Torrey Holloway.

Hannicap Circus is a huge reflection of Bizarre's rap persona and stage presence and yet many of the songs carry important subject matter, a bit of Bizarre's past and talking about the state of hip-hop. The album peaked at number 48 on the Billboard 200, selling 21,000 copies for the first week. It spawned only one single: "Rockstar".

== Critical reception ==
Professional ratings
Aggregate scores
Source	Rating
Metacritic	44/100
Review scores
Source	Rating
AllMusic	3/5 stars
The A.V. Club	Unfavorable
The Guardian	2/5 stars
RapReviews	8/10
Rolling Stone	2/5 stars
The Situation	2.5/5 stars
Spin	C−

Hannicap Circus received mixed reviews from music critics who were less than enthusiastic with Bizarre's brand of humor and drama. At Metacritic, which assigns a normalized rating out of 100 reviews from mainstream critics the album received an average score of 44, based on 8 reviews.

AllMusic's David Jeffries praised the album for its beats and lyrical content that were more akin to a better produced Insane Clown Posse, calling it "solid, filthy, fun, and everything else that you'd want from a less nimble Kool Keith". Steve 'Flash' Juon of RapReviews found Bizarre's brand of demented shock humor entertaining and is complemented with appropriate production and a cast of equally game featured artists, concluding that "for fans of D12 and/or Hunter S. Thompson, Hannicap Circus is one crazy trip through the mind of a lunatic".

Usman Sajjid of The Situation felt that the material was hampered by the beats and lyricism lacking energy, concluding that "With a moderate effort from D12’s Bizarre, 'Hannicap Circus' may have just exceeded expectations of rap listeners not expecting a strong album". Dorian Lynskey of The Guardian said that the album had potential to be a competent horrorcore effort but was weighted down by Bizarre wanting it to be both humorous and dramatic with neither side fully delivering, concluding that "Hannicap Circus is the last thing you'd expect from a fat, shower-cap-wearing, nipple-rubbing son of a bitch: boring". Nathan Rabin of The A.V. Club heavily criticized Bizarre for his monotonous delivery over subject matter that fails to gain laughs, saying "anyone who doesn't find the topics of pedophilia, drug abuse, or incest innately hilarious will find Hannicap Circus rough going".

== Soundtrack ==
"Gospel Weed Song" is featured during the credits of Harold & Kumar Escape from Guantanamo Bay.

== Track listing ==
Credits adapted from Discogs.

Hannicap Circus standard edition
No.	Title	Writer(s)	Producer	Length
1.	"Public Service Announcement" (skit) (featuring Jeff Bass)			0:26
2.	"Intro" (featuring Young Miles)	Rufus Johnson; Richard Garcia; Tony Minter	Ruk; TNyce	1:38
3.	"Gospel Weed Song"	R. Johnson	Shea	3:35
4.	"Fuck Your Life" (featuring Sindee Syringe)	R. Johnson; D. Johnson; Denaun Porter; Jacque Spears	Mr. Porter	4:29
5.	"Fat Father" (skit) (featuring Fatt Father)			1:46
6.	"Let the Record Skip" (featuring Young Miles)	R. Johnson; Garcia; Minter	Ruk; TNyce	2:45
7.	"I'm In Love Witchu"	R. Johnson; Tony Cottrell	Hi-Tek	2:44
8.	"Rockstar"	R. Johnson; Marshall Mathers; Luis Resto	Eminem; Luis Resto^{[a]}	3:01
9.	"Ghetto Music" (featuring Swifty McVay, stic.man and King Gordy)	R. Johnson; Clayton Gavin	Sicknotes	4:33
10.	"Life Styles" (skit) (featuring Torrey Holloway)			1:22
11.	"I'm So Cool"	R. Johnson; Michael Chavarria; Timothy Thedford	Mike Chav	4:18
12.	"Porno Bitches" (featuring Devin the Dude and Big Boi)	R. Johnson; Devin Copeland; Antwan Patton; Porter	Mr. Porter	4:38
13.	"Crush on You"	R. Johnson; Ernest Franklin, Jr.	Sol Messiah	2:54
14.	"Bad Day"	R. Johnson; Willie Albert Goodman; Christopher Jasper; Ernie Isley; Harry Ray; Marvin Isley; O'Kelly Isley Jr.; O'Shea Jackson; Ronald Isley; Rudolph Isley; Sylvia Robinson	Erick Sermon	5:08
15.	"I Need a Friend"	R. Johnson; Shaphan Williams	Silent Riot	2:57
16.	"One Chance"	R. Johnson; Brian Armstead; Spears	J Thrill	4:03
17.	"Hip Hop" (featuring Eminem)	R. Johnson; Mathers; Cottrell	Hi-Tek	4:31
18.	"Doctor Doctor" (featuring Obie Trice and Dion)	R. Johnson; Cottrell	Hi-Tek	3:43
19.	"Coming Home" (featuring Kuniva and Raphael Saadiq)	Robert Ozuna*, Jake And The Phatman*, Raphael Saadiq, Taura Jackson*, V. Carlisle*, Yavonne Stinson	Raphael Saadiq; Jake and the Phatman^{[b]}	3:46
20.	"Nuthin' at All" (featuring Swifty McVay, Kuniva, Kon Artis and Proof of D12)	R. Johnson; Porter; Von Carlisle; Ondre Moore; DeShaun Holton	Mr. Porter	4:28
Total length:				1:06:45

Japan bonus track
No.	Title	Length
21.	"Scooby Doo" (featuring Sindee Syringe)	2:42
Total length:		1:09:27

Notes

- ^{^[a]} signifies an additional producer.
- ^{^[b]} signifies a co-producer.
- On the edited version, all skits were cut and it left only 17 tracks. Also all profanity was blanked on the edited version with the exception of "Fuck Your Life", which allegedly contained backmasking.
- Dion provides additional vocals on tracks 7 and 18.
- Mr. Porter provides additional vocals on track 12.
- Shaphan "MAESTRO" Williams provides additional vocals on track 13.

== Charts ==
Chart (2005)	Peak position
Australian Albums (ARIA Charts)	67
French Albums (SNEP)	184
UK Albums (OCC)	43
US Billboard 200	48
US Top R&B/Hip-Hop Albums (Billboard)	26
US Top Rap Albums (Billboard)	12
