= Last American Rock Stars =

Studio album by L.A.R.S.
- Released: February 16, 2018
- Genre: Hip-hop
- Length: 40:03
- Label: Majik Ninja
- Producer: Del; Foul Mouth; Heizenburr; Ereezybeatz; Witt; Rooq; Mr. Porter; Seven

L.A.R.S. chronology
Foul World (2017)	Last American Rock Stars (2018)

Bizarre chronology
Taking Lives (2013)	Last American Rock Stars (2018)	Rufus (2019)

King Gordy chronology
How to Gag a Maggot (2017)	Last American Rock Stars (2018)	The House LP (2020)

Professional ratings
Review scores
Source	Rating
RapReviews	7/10

Last American Rock Stars is the debut studio album by American hip hop duo L.A.R.S., which consists of Detroit-based rappers Bizarre (of D12) and King Gordy (of the Fat Killahz). It was released on February 16, 2018, through Majik Ninja Entertainment. It features guest appearances from Boobie Trapp, Fury, G-Mo Skee, Trizz, Twista, and Twiztid. The album debuted at number six on the Billboard Heatseekers Albums chart in the US.

Music videos for "Suicide" and "Lit" were directed by Nick Margetic.

== Track listing ==
No.	Title	Producer(s)	Length
1.	"Intro"	Seven	0:55
2.	"Stomp"	Heizenburr	3:31
3.	"Just Got Out the County" (featuring Fury)	Ereezybeatz	4:05
4.	"Cocaine in Miami"	Del	3:40
5.	"LARS Spangled Banner"		1:59
6.	"Lit"	Witt	3:27
7.	"California"	Del	2:39
8.	"Rock n Roll" (featuring Twiztid)	FoulMouth	3:39
9.	"Suicide"	FoulMouth	2:22
10.	"Ganja Man" (featuring Boobie Trapp)	Rooq	3:14
11.	"No Lights"	Del	3:35
12.	"Start a War" (featuring G-Mo Skee, Trizz and Twista)	Heizenburr	4:27
13.	"I Believe I Can Fly"	Mr. Porter	2:32
Total length:			40:03

== Charts ==
Chart (2018)	Peak position
US Heatseekers Albums (Billboard)	6
