= Attack of the Weirdos =

EP by Bizarre
- Released: September 1, 1998
- Recorded: 1997–1998
- Genre: Hip hop; hardcore hip hop; underground hip hop
- Length: 28:04
- Label: Federation Records (1998 release); Majik Ninja Entertainment/Federation Records (2018 reissue)
- Producer: DJ Head; Mr. Porter; Hush; J Dilla; Mad Chemist

Bizarre chronology
Attack of the Weirdos (1998)	Hannicap Circus (2005)

Professional ratings
Review scores
Source	Rating
Allmusic	3/5 stars

Attack of the Weirdos is the debut extended play by Detroit rapper and D12 member Bizarre. It was released on September 1, 1998, via Federation Records.

Audio production of the seven track album was handled by local Detroit deejays and producers such as DJ Head, who was D12's deejay at the time, Mad Chemist, Hush of Da Ruckus, and the now acclaimed producers J Dilla of Slum Village and Mr. Porter.

Being a member of hip hop collectives D12 and Outsidaz, Bizarre had some of his bandmates of both crews to appear on this album. The EP earned Bizarre the Inner City Flava Of The Year award in 1998.

On May 11, 2018, it was announced that Majik Ninja Entertainment would be teaming up with Federation to re-release the EP for its 20-year anniversary. It is set to be reissued on July 27, 2018

== Track listing ==
No.	Title	Writer(s)	Producer(s)	Length
1.	"Rap Guys"	Rufus Johnson	Hush	4:07
2.	"What, What" (featuring Da Brigade)	Johnson; Denaun Porter; Von Carlisle	Mr. Porter	3:49
3.	"Trife Thieves" (featuring Eminem and Fuzz Scoota)	Johnson; Marshall Mathers	DJ Head	3:58
4.	"Down Low"	Johnson	Mad Chemist	2:14
5.	"Over React"	Johnson	DJ Head	3:55
6.	"Butterfly"	Johnson	J Dilla	3:24
7.	"Get the Dick (Raw Mix)" (featuring Outsidaz)	Johnson; Jerome Hinds Jr.; Dewayne Battle; Aubrey King; Shakur Nur-al-din Abdullah	DJ Head	6:37
Total length:				28:04

Note

- Track 3 sampled "Prelude in C-Sharp Minor Op.3 No.2" by Sergei Rachmaninoff (1919)

== Personnel ==
Credits adapted from Discogs

- Rufus "Bizarre" Johnson – lead vocals
- Denaun "Kon Artis" Porter – vocals & producer (track 2)
- Von "Kuniva" Carlisle – vocals (track 2)
- Marshall "Eminem" Mathers – vocals (track 3)
- Fuzz Scoota – vocals (track 3)
- Aubrey "Az Izz" King – vocals (track 7)
- Jerome "Pacewon" Hinds – vocals (track 7)
- Shakir Nur-al-din "Yah Yah" Abdullah – vocals (track 7)
- Dewayne "Young Zee" Battle – vocals & engineer (track 7)
- Mad Chemist – additional vocals & producer (track 4)
- ABM Nubian – additional vocals (track 2)
- Dead Day – additional vocals (track 6)
- Kevin "DJ Head" Bell – producer (tracks 3, 5, 7), mixing (track 7)
- Daniel "Hush" Carlisle – producer (track 1)
- James "J Dilla" Yancey – producer (track 6)
- Leonard "Lenn Swann" Adams – scratches (track 5)
- Chaz Martin – engineer (tracks 1–2, 4–6)
- I.V. Duncan – engineer (track 3)
- Rob Fwarthout – mixing
- DeShaun "Proof" Holton – mixing (track 7)
- Marc Kempf – executive producer, art direction, photography (cover & inside)
- Rico Shelton – executive producer
- Darrell Williams – executive producer
- Bob Martus – photography (inside)
