= Bang Belushi =

American rapper

- Also known as: Shim E. Bango; Bang Warhol; Shim-E. Bango
- Born: Rudolph Rinchere; January 10, 1978 (age 48)
- Origin: Detroit, Michigan, U.S.
- Genres: Underground hip hop; battle rap
- Occupations: Rapper; hypeman
- Years active: 2000–present
- Labels: No Tyze Entertainment; Middle Finger Music
- Member of: Fat Killahz
- Website: Twitter

Rudolph Rinchere (born January 10, 1978), better known by his stage name Bang Belushi (previously Shim-E-Bango), is an American underground rapper from Detroit, Michigan. He is a current member of the Fat Killahz and also Obie Trice's hypeman.

Bango studied at Oak Park High School, Oak Park, Michigan.

Due to the Fat Killahz hiatus, Bango collaborated with producer Chanes to release his first solo extended play The Bridgecard EP in 2011 featured guest appearances by Guilty Simpson, Moe Dirdee, Invy Da Truth, F.K., and Miz Korona. In 2016, he collaborated with his fellow Fat Killahz bandmate King Gordy under Bango's new alias Bang Belushi to release Herojuana EP. In the beginning of 2017, he drops his second solo extended play Help Yourself.

It was announced via Twitter that Bango will release his debut full-length studio album The Adventures of Bang Belushi with producer Shane "Foul Mouth" Webb later following Help Yourself in 2017. However, the album was released on December 28, 2018, via Middle Finger Music.

Belushi stated Run-DMC, 2Pac, Notorious B.I.G., N.W.A. as his influence.

== Discography ==
=== Studio albums ===
- 2005 – Guess Who's Coming to Dinner? (with Fatt Father, Marv Won and King Gordy, as the Fat Killahz)
- 2018 – The Adventures of Bang Belushi
- 2021 – Rudy
- 2021 – Belushi on Ghawd (with Wavy Da Ghawd)

=== Extended plays ===
- 2011 - The E.P. (with Fatt Father, Marv Won and King Gordy, as the Fat Killahz)
- 2011 - The Bridgecard
- 2016 - Herojuana (with King Gordy)
- 2017 - help yourself.

=== Mixtapes ===
- 2003 - 2 Fat, 2 Furious (with Fatt Father, Marv Won and King Gordy, as the Fat Killahz)
- 2004 - WFKR 31.3 FKM: FK Radio the Mixtape (with Fatt Father, Marv Won and King Gordy, as the Fat Killahz)

=== Guest appearances ===
- 2001 - "Everybody's Trippin'" by DJ Butter, Slickonez, Dogmatic, B-Boy R.E.G., King Gordy from Shit Happens
- 2001 - "These Dayz" by Lab Animalz from Let the Animalz Out
- 2003 - "Power of the Underground" by SickNotes, 5ela, Promatic, Obie Trice, King Gordy, Supa Emcee, Paradime from The Virus & Sick Note Soldiers
- 2006 - "It's About to Go Down" (prod. Kon Artis) by Salam Wreck from Trouble Soon
- 2006 - "Only Wanna Smoke" & "Place Ya Bets" by Alius Pnukkl & King Gordy from The Unknown Filez
- 2009 - "Get Back" by Marv Won & Fatt Father from Way of the Won
- 2010 - "Amen" by Fatt Father from Fatherly Advice
- 2011 - "14 Emcees" by D12, 3Six, Beez, Calicoe, Chacity, Fatt Father, Kid Vishis, Mae Day, Miz Korona, Moe Dirdee, Redd Bone, Seven the General, Shakia Snow, T. Dot from Return of the Dozen Vol. 2
- 2015 - "The Herb" by Knox Money & Steve O from Going Over
- 2016 - "In the Sky" by Hundred Barz from Solace
- 2018 - "'93 Jerry Ball" & "Bang and the Barfly" by Aztek the Barfly from Line King
