= Bizarre (rapper) =

American rapper (born 1976)

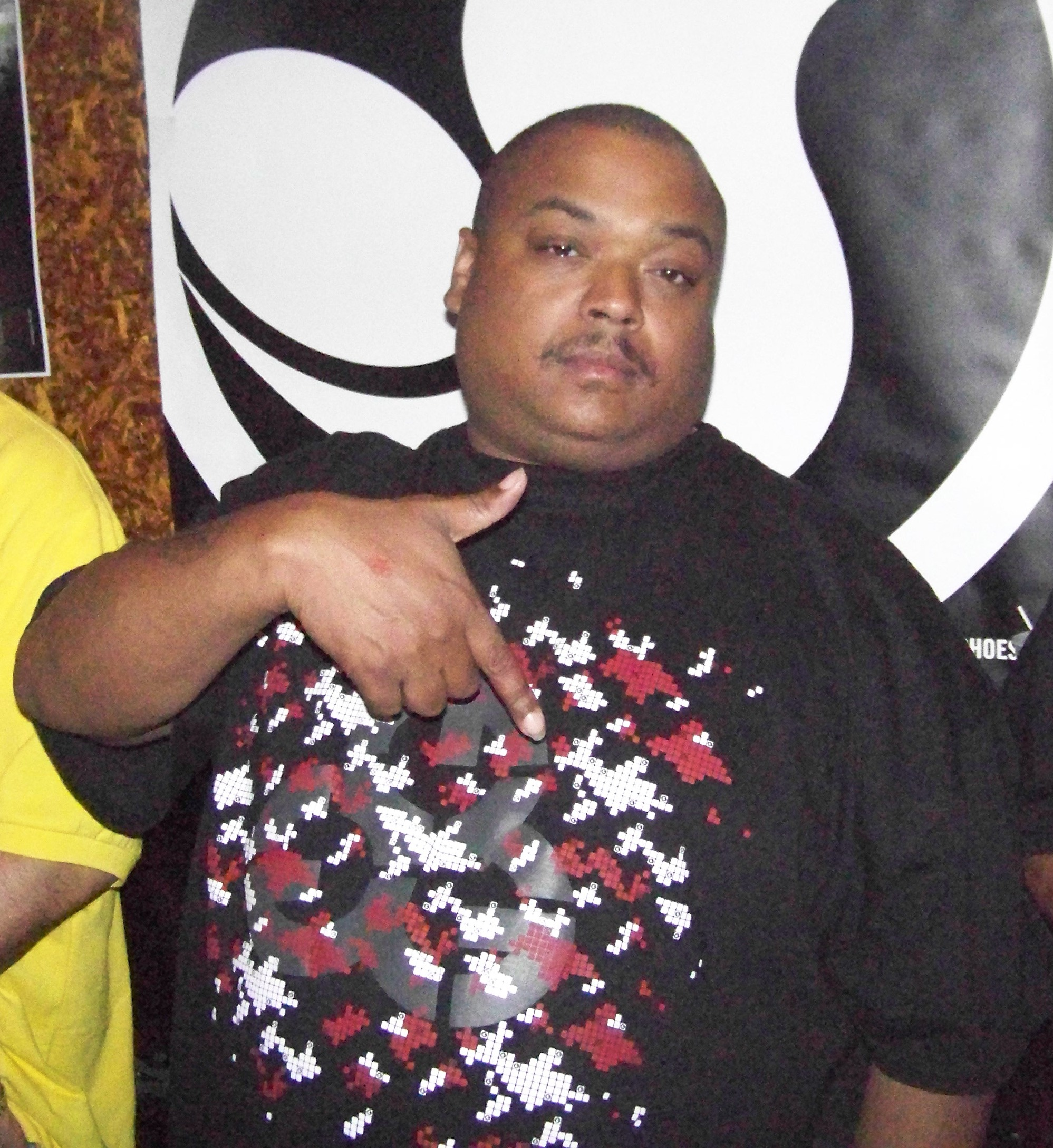
- Bizarre in 2008

Background information
- Born: Rufus Johnson; July 5, 1976 (age 50); Detroit, Michigan, U.S.
- Genres: Midwestern hip-hop; horrorcore; comedy hip-hop
- Occupations: Rapper; songwriter; record producer; actor
- Years active: 1994–present
- Labels: Redhead (current); Majik Ninja; Federation; Koch; Sanctuary; Average Joes; Shady (former)
- Member of: L.A.R.S.
- Formerly of: Outsidaz; Something Awful; D12; The Frst

Rufus Johnson (born July 5, 1976), better known by his stage name Bizarre (formerly Bizarre Kid), is an American rapper, best known as a member of the Detroit-based hip-hop group D12.

== Early life ==
Bizarre was born Rufus Johnson on July 5, 1976, in Detroit. Bizarre grew up living with his single mother. He started rapping when he was in fifth grade. His teacher thought he was talking to himself, and began calling him 'Bizarre Kid', which eventually led to the stage name 'Bizarre'.

== Career ==
=== 1995–2011: D12 and solo career ===
In 1995, Bizarre was invited by Proof to join D12 along with other local Detroit rappers, Kuniva, Kon Artis and Bugz of Da Brigade and former members Fuzz Scoota and Eye Kyu who were all neighborhood friends. He also met Eminem through Proof who was also Eminem’s best friend and hype man. Bizarre used to attend a club on Friday nights called 'The Shelter' in Saint Andrew's Hall, where rap battles were held.

In 1997, Bizarre appeared on D12's debut EP titled The Underground EP which also included a guest appearance from Eminem. Bizarre was named Inner City Entertainment's "Flava of the Week" and went on to release his debut EP, Attack of the Weirdos in 1998. Along with Eminem, he became an honorary member of the Outsidaz.

In May 1999, Bugz was shot a few hours prior to a concert which eventually led to Eminem joining the group after volunteering as Bugz’ replacement and also led to Swifty McVay joining the group as Bugz’ final request before he was murdered.

In 2000, Eminem released his third studio album, The Marshall Mathers LP where Bizarre appeared on the track "Amityville" and he also appeared with D12 on a track called "Under the Influence".

In 2001, D12 released their debut album, Devil's Night which received mixed reviews from critics but was a commercial success, debuting at number one on the US Billboard 200 with 372,000 album sales in its first week. The album featured singles Purple Pills, Fight Music, Ain’t Nuttin’ But Music and Shit on You and had guest appearances from Truth Hurts, Dr. Dre and Obie Trice. It was also recorded in memory of Bugz.

In 2004, D12 their second studio album, D12 World which featured the singles "My Band", "How Come", "Git Up", "U R the One" and "40 Oz". It also included a solo track by Bizarre called "Just Like U".

On June 28, 2005, Bizarre released his debut studio album, Hannicap Circus through his own label Redhead Records, which received mixed reviews. His debut single, "Rockstar" was released a month later which featured guest appearances from Eminem, D12 and a cameo appearance from Terry Crews. Another song off that same album titled "Gospel Weed Song" was played during the credits of Harold & Kumar Escape from Guantanamo Bay.

In 2006, he made an appearance along with D12 member, Kuniva on Shady Records’ first compilation album Eminem Presents: The Re-Up, on the track "Murder". Following the death of D12’s founder Proof in April 2006, he and the rest of the group became inactive for some time.

In 2006, he appeared on the third season of reality TV show Celebrity Fit Club where he lost 31 pounds.

In 2007, Bizarre released his second studio album called Blue Cheese & Coney Island. This included the some of his most famous hits, such as "Fat Boy". In 2008, Bizarre and D12 recorded their first official mixtape titled Return of the Dozen. A sequel titled Return of the Dozen Vol. 2 followed in 2011.

=== 2010–present: Collaborations ===
In 2010, Bizarre released his third studio album on Average Joes Entertainment, titled Friday Night at St. Andrews. The album is more reality-based on actual situations throughout Bizarre's early life and career, thus the album is more conscious than his previous releases. The album features guest appearances from Seven the General, Royce da 5'9", Tech N9ne, Yelawolf, Kuniva, and more.

The first single released was "Believer" with Tech N9ne & Nate Walker. The second official single for the album was "Rap's Finest" featuring Kuniva, Seven the General, Royce da 5'9" & Redman. However, for unexplained reasons, Redman would not appear on the album version of the single or the video.

Bizarre, along with King Gordy, formed a hip hop duo called The Davidians. The Davidians were featured on Esham's mixtape, The Butcher Shop. The duo is currently signed to Majik Ninja Entertainment under the name Last American Rock Stars. Bizarre was featured in Snowgoons's music video with Swifty McVay, King Gordy, Sean Strange and Meth Mouth.

In 2010, Bizarre was featured on the single "Be a Legend" with Russian hip-hop group Red Family MC'z. In 2011, Bizarre was featured on the track "Shock Em" with underground rap group Bankrupt Records for the album Double Vision. In 2012, Bizarre released his fourth mixtape, titled This Guy's a Weirdo.

In 2014, he released a song called "Pray for Me" for his upcoming album. His Lace Blunts 2 mixtape was released in March 2014, with nineteen tracks featuring guest artists such as Fuzz Scoota of their group D12, Rittz, Young Zee, King Gordy, and Big T.

Bizarre was featured on an international collaboration track called "Fuck the DJ" by UK rapper Blacklisted MC also featuring Coolio, Adil Omar (from Pakistan) and Uzimon (from Bermuda) the song was premiered on music website Noisey from ''Vice'' magazine in October 2014.

Later in the year he wrote a verse alongside Detroit artists Mastamind and Jeremiah Ferguson for their song "Whats Right".

In 2014, he was featured on the single "Open Heart Surgery" by rapper Lazarus. It was released under All Def Digital and it won the award for "Song of the Year" at the 12th Underground Music Awards in New York City.

He has also made an appearance on a track titled "In Yo Behind" by Struggle Da Preacher which was released on Struggle's album Ups'n'Downs on June 30, 2014. In July 2015 they shot a video for it in Moscow, Russia. Mike ADHD "Frag Out" featuring Young Dirty Bastard, Baby Eazy E and Bizarre.

In August 2017, The Keepaz of the Krypt (One Man Kru & Kapital Z) single "Diaries of the Whack Emcees" feat. Bizarre of D12 was released on all digital media outlets as well as One Man Kru's bandcamp page. The song garnered over 1 million plays on SoundCloud in its first week of release. The track was released just two weeks before it was announced that Bizarre had signed to Majik Ninja Entertainment.

In May 2018, Bizarre released music video "Cocaine In Miami" directed by Abeni Nazeer. He was also a feature guest on the Song Sadistentreff 2 by German rapper Crystal f, along with Timi Hendrix and King Gordy.

On July 9, 2018, Bizarre announced that he was reviving Redhead Records with Danny Mellz being his first act other than himself

In September 2018, Bizarre featured in the single "Weirdo (feat. Bizarre)" by No Concept on Drumsound and Bassline Smith's label, Technique Recordings.

Also in September 2018, Bizarre made headlines again with Eminem by releasing his own diss track aimed towards Machine Gun Kelly, Jay Electronica and Joe Budden during the MGK and Joe Budden vs. Eminem beef of 2018. Bizarre's diss track titled "Love Tap" was released as a single everywhere on September 18, 2018.

Bizarre also signed a deal for his podcast “The Bizarre World Podcast” with The Digital Soapbox Network/CBS/Entercom

On October 10, 2019, Bizarre released his second Extended Play Rufus. The day after the release of his second extended play, he announced the release of a duo mixtape “Leatherface Mixtape” with Hopsin on October 31, 2019.

Bizarre performs an intro and adlibs on Eminem & Ed Sheeran’s “Those Kinda Nights” released in January 17, 2020.

On May 31, 2020, Bizarre appeared on an album “Tabu“ of a Czech rapper named Schyzo on the song “Lubrikant“.

Bizarre is featured on "Fat Man Swag" by Pacific Northwest rapper Jawbo, released on July 22, 2021.

Bizarre is featured on "Limitless" by Canadian rapper Brax, from album "Leave it to Cleaver" released in late 2021.

On October 31, 2021, Bizarre shared his fifth album "Dumpster Juice" with features from Kidd Kidd, Merkules, and Giggs, among others.

In July 2024, Bizarre made a surprise guest feature on Eminem’s "Antichrist" off his twelfth studio album The Death of Slim Shady (Coup de Grâce).

== Personal life ==
Bizarre currently lives in Detroit, Michigan, where he continues to produce music and social media content. Bizarre previously lived with his ex-wife, Detroit rapper Sindee Syringe, the lead singer of the band by the same name.

== Discography ==
=== Studio albums ===
- Hannicap Circus (2005)
- Blue Cheese & Coney Island (2007)
- Friday Night at St. Andrews (2010)
- Rufus (2019)
- Dumpster Juice (2021)
- Peter (2022)
- He Got a Gun (2022)
- 18159 Stout (2023)
- Don't Cross The Street (2026)

=== Extended plays ===
- Attack of the Weirdos (1998)
- Ratt Poison (2024)

=== Collaborative albums ===
- Devil's Night (with D12) (2001)
- D12 World (with D12) (2004)
- Taking Lives (with Fury as Something Awful) (2013)
- Last American Rock Stars (with King Gordy as L.A.R.S.) (2018)
- All in My Head (with Wack Rac) (2020)
- Drugged Emotions Unleashed (with Freder Seric) (2023)
- HGG2 (with Foul Mouth) (2023)
- Killah Kombo EP (with Dheezy) (2023)
- Ratt Poison (with Foul Mouth) (2024)
- Trigger Treat (with Dope D.O.D.) (2024)
- Fat & Skinny (with Young Zee & Foul Mouth) (2024)
- HGG3: Art Peace (with Foul Mouth) (2024)
- H.G.G.4 (with Foul Mouth) (2024)
- HGG5 Basement Jazz (with Foul Mouth) (2025)

=== Mixtapes ===
- Bizarre's World (2007)
- Hate Music (2008)
- Liquor, Weed & Food Stamps (2009)
- This Guy's a Weirdo (2012)
- Lace Blunts (2013)
- Lace Blunts 2 (2014)
- Dab Life (2015)
- Tweek Sity (2015)
- Tweek Sity 2 (2017)
- Foul World (with King Gordy as L.A.R.S.) (2017)
- Pill God (2018)
- Freestyle Fridays (2025)
- Freestyle Fridays, Vol. 2 (2026)

=== Collaboration singles ===
- "Where da Hoes At?" (with King Killumbia & Project Pat) (2019)
- "All Night" (with King Killumbia & MET G) (2019)
- "Detroit 2 Memphis" (with Kingpin Skinny Pimp & Mexiveli) (2019)
- "Lubrikant" (with Schyzo) (2019)

== Filmography ==
=== Film ===
Year	Film	Role
2005	The Longest Yard	Basketball Convict
