= 1st Down =

American hip-hop duo

- Also known as: First Down
- Origin: Detroit, Michigan, U.S.
- Genre: Hip-hop
- Years active: 1992–2006
- Label: Payday
- Past members: Phat Kat; J Dilla (deceased)

1st Down was an American hip-hop duo from Detroit composed of rapper Phat Kat and DJ/record producer Jay Dee, affiliated with Slum Village.

The pair inked a deal with Payday Records in 1995 and begun recording songs, which led the release of a twelve-inch single "A Day Wit The Homiez" b/w "Front Street". The latter appeared on the label's compilation album Representin' The Streets.... On Payday. Disbanded as a group due to label issues, the two continued to collaborate on many occasions afterwards.

They once again reunited for Phat Kat's 1999 extended play Dedication to the Suckers, which was produced entirely by Jay Dee. Some of their further collaborations can be found on Slum Village's Fan-Tas-Tic (Vol. 1), Jay Dee's Welcome 2 Detroit, and both of Phat Kat's solo albums, The Undeniable LP and Carte Blanche.

On February 10, 2006, Jay Dee died at the age of 32 from a combination of thrombotic thrombocytopenic purpura and lupus.

In 2014, Sergent Records released 250 copies of a 5-track EP entitled Detroit's Finest, composed of original demos recorded in 96-97.

== Discography ==
Singles and extended plays

Title	Album details
No Place to Go	Release date: 1992; Label: —; Format: 12", EP, Cassette
"A Day wit the Homiez"	Release date: 1995; Label: PayDay; Format: 12", CS
Detroit's Finest	Release date: 2014; Label: Sergent; Format: EP

Appearances

- "Fat Cat Song" from Fan-Tas-Tic (Vol. 1) (1997)
- "Dedication to the Suckers" — House Shoes Recordings (1999)
- "Featuring Phat Kat" from Welcome 2 Detroit (2001)
- "Door" from The Undeniable LP (2004)
- "Game Over" from Two/Three (2006)
- "Nasty Ain't It?", "My Old Label", "Cold Steel", "Game Time" and "Don't Nobody Care About Us" from Carte Blanche (2007)
- "Digi Dirt" from Jay Stay Paid (2009)
