= Sunset Blvd. (album) =

Studio album by Yancey Boys
- Released: October 29, 2013
- Recorded: 1995–1998 (beats, instruments); 2012–2013 (vocals, DJ scratches, mixing)
- Genre: Hip hop
- Length: 50:11
- Label: Delicious Vinyl; Yancey Media Group
- Producer: Frank Nitt (exec.); Michael Ross (exec.); J Dilla

Illa J chronology
4 Past Midnite (2010)	Sunset Blvd. (2013)	Illa J (2015)

Frank Nitt chronology
The Smoke Musik EP (2013)	Sunset Blvd. (2013)

Singles from Sunset Blvd.
- 1. "Quicksand" Released: August 27, 2013

Sunset Blvd. is the debut LP by Detroit-based hip hop duo Yancey Boys (Illa J and Frank Nitt), released on October 29, 2013 by Yancey Media Group in conjunction with Delicious Vinyl and distributed through Traffic Entertainment Group. The record is built around a recently unearthed batch of music created by Illa J's late elder brother, James "J Dilla" Yancey. The album features the latter's past collaborators like De La Soul's Posdnuos, Slum Village's T3, Common, The Pharcyde's Slimkid3 and Talib Kweli. Additional guests on Sunset Blvd. include DJs Rhettmatic, C-Minus, and J. Rocc as well as rapper Guilty Simpson and R&B singer Eric Roberson.

== Background ==
John "Illa J" Yancey is J Dilla's younger brother. Frank Nitt, who grew up with Dilla in Detroit, is the Chief Curator of the late producer's music catalog and oversees the official approval of material released by the Yancey Media Group. In the spirit of further paying tribute to the legacy of J Dilla, in 2012, Illa J and Frank Nitt have teamed up to form a new hip hop duo named after Illa J's original Dilla-produced album Yancey Boys (2008). Illa J began making music under the Yancey Boys banner with the guidance of Frank in 2008. "Putting together the first Yancey Boys album was a chance to put Illa J on the map and keep it in the family," says Delicious Vinyl co-founder & CEO Michael Ross. "On Sunset Blvd, Illa [J] and Frank [Nitt] dove deep into these stunning unreleased Dilla beats to make an honest album with all the right collaborations." As Frank Nitt states: "We've created an album that would make Dilla proud. But this isn't a nostalgia trip. Dilla's beats were so future-forward that they're right on time in 2013, and we've assembled the best artists possible to represent that."

== Critical reception ==
Professional ratings
Review scores
Source	Rating
AllMusic	4/5 stars
Exclaim!	(7/10)
Pitchfork Media	(7.3/10)

Upon its release, Sunset Blvd. opened up to generally favorable reviews from music critics. Pitchfork Media's Jonah Bromwich gave the album a 7.3 out of ten, saying: "Sunset Blvd. refuses to let itself be colored by regret. This is the most joyous record that we've seen from Dilla's disciples since the producer's death in 2006. By avoiding the tendency to wallow in the past or to define itself in opposition to contemporary rap, it joins the ranks of albums from Camp Lo and Black Milk, two other former backpack acts who updated their formula successfully this year, breaking free of the cliches that had held them back and making genuinely engaging hip-hop music." Exclaim! reviewer Kevin Jones gave the album a seven out of ten, saying: "Though some of the beats are thought to date back to the producer's Pharcyde period, Sunset Blvd. maintains a general freshness and lingering sense of soothing familiarity, while the energetic vocal contributions make for a complete album that does the Yancey name justice for both Illa J and his legendary older brother." David Jeffries of AllMusic gave the album four out of five stars, saying: "Fans thinking these rare beats should be handled with more respect are missing the point -- and can seek out the instrumentals, which are available as a bonus or separately -- but those who approach this as fond memories on Friday night will find themselves smiling until the sun comes up on Monday. Good times, great rhymes, and excellent beats."

== Singles ==
On August 27, 2013, the lead single, "Quicksand," featuring longtime J Dilla collaborator Common, and Dezi Paige, was released as an EP along with "Fisherman" on the B-side, featuring guest performances from J Rocc of Beat Junkies, Vice and Detroit Serious.

== Track listing ==
All tracks include beats produced by J Dilla.

No.	Title	Length
1.	"Dilltro" (featuring Dank)	1:30
2.	"Fisherman" (featuring J. Rocc, Vice and Detroit Serious)	3:49
3.	"Lovin' U" (featuring Eric Roberson)	4:00
4.	"Go and Ask the DJ" (featuring Guilty Simpson and J. Rocc)	4:01
5.	"Jeep Volume" (featuring T3 and C-Minus)	3:51
6.	"Flowers" (featuring Niko Gray, Talib Kweli and Rhettmatic)	4:36
7.	"Honk Ya Horn" (featuring J. Pinder)	3:56
8.	"Slippin'" (featuring Early Mac)	3:35
9.	"Without Wings"	3:08
10.	"Beautiful" (featuring Posdnuos and Botni Applebum)	3:37
11.	"Quicksand" (featuring Common and Dezi Paige)	4:41
12.	"Rock My World" (featuring Slimkid3 and Niko Gray)	3:19
13.	"The Throwaway"	3:23
14.	"This Evening"	2:45
Total length:		50:11

Notes

- ”The Throwaway” originally appeared on the J Dilla EP ‘The Lost Scrolls Vol. 1’

Sample Credits

- ”Jeep Volume” interpolates the J Dilla song “Reckless Driving”, from his EP ‘Ruff Draft’
- ”The Throwaway” contains lyrics from “The Choice is Yours” performed by Black Sheep

== Personnel ==
Credits for Sunset Blvd. adapted from AllMusic and from the album liner notes.

- Yancey Boys – Primary Artist
- Botni Applebum – Featured Artist
- C-Minus – Featured Artist
- Common – Featured Artist
- Cook and Cover (Straight Up) – Art Design
- Dave Cooley – Mastering
- J Dilla – Producer
- Daddy Kev – Mastering
- Dank – Featured Artist
- Detroit Serious – Featured Artist
- Early Mac – Featured Artist
- Todd Fairall – Mixing Engineer
- Niko Gray – Featured Artist
- Asato Iida – Photography
- Talib Kweli – Featured Artist
- Frank Nitt – Executive Producer, Design Concept
- Dezi Paige – Featured Artist
- J. Pinder – Featured Artist
- Posdnuos – Featured Artist
- Rhettmatic – Featured Artist
- Eric Roberson – Featured Artist
- J. Rocc – Featured Artist
- Michael Ross – Executive Producer
- Geoff Schroer – Mixing Engineer
- Slimkid3 – Featured Artist
- Guilty Simpson – Featured Artist
- T3 – Featured Artist
- Vice Verse – Featured Artist
