= Villa Manifesto =

Studio album by Slum Village
- Released: July 27, 2010
- Recorded: 2009–2010
- Studio: RJ Rice Studios (Farmington Hills, Michigan)
- Genre: Hip hop
- Length: 46:43
- Label: Ne'Astra Music Group; E1
- Producer: Hi-Tek; J Dilla; Khrysis; Mr. Porter; Supa Dave West; Young RJ

Slum Village chronology
Slum Village (2005)	Villa Manifesto (2010)	Evolution (2013)

Singles from Villa Manifesto
- 1. "Faster" Released: June 1, 2010

Professional ratings
Review scores
Source	Rating
AllMusic	3.5/5 stars
The A.V. Club	B
HipHopDX	4/5
Pitchfork	7.1/10
PopMatters	8/10 medals
RapReviews	8/10
Spin	6/10 marks

Villa Manifesto is the sixth studio album by American hip hop group Slum Village. It was released on July 27, 2010, via Ne'Astra Music Group and E1 Entertainment. The recording sessions took place at RJ Rice Studios in Farmington Hills, Michigan. The album was produced by Young RJ, J Dilla, Hi-Tek, Kon Artis, Khrysis and Supa Dave West, with Craig Lane serving as co-producer. It features guest appearances from AB, Colin Munroe, Dwele, Keys, Little Brother, Phife Dawg, Posdnuos and Vice Verse.

In the United States, the album debuted at number 37 on the Top R&B/Hip-Hop Albums, number 21 on the Top Rap Albums and number 31 on the Independent Albums charts.

The album was supported with Villa Manifesto EP, released on December 15, 2009, and the lone single "Faster" b/w "Lock It Down", which was released on June 1, 2010. An accompanying music video for the song "Faster" was released on July 12, 2010. Villa Manifesto Instrumentals was released on October 23, 2012, via Ne'Astra Music.

== Background ==
Founding member Baatin, who reunited with the group in 2008 prior to his death the year after, worked on nearly twenty songs; unreleased vocals from J Dilla are featured on four songs. Villa Manifesto serves as both a reunion and a memorial album. Two late founding members of the group (Baatin and J Dilla) appeared posthumously as main artists of the album alongside T3 and Elzhi. Illa J, J Dilla's younger brother, is also contributed to the album, as well as production from Young RJ, making it the first Slum Village full-length to feature all six members. Founding member T3 stated: "I wanted to pull the whole squad together. The reason why we call it Villa Manifesto is that it was a statement we want to give our people because we had been away for so long. What we're doing, what's going on, how we're feeling and where we're at today". Before the album's release, T3 stated on Twitter that it was their final studio album. However, in a subsequent interview with Billboard, he clarified: "If this album does phenomenal and the supporters just overwhelm me, I wouldn't have a choice but to do another record – and I believe this record could be phenomenal for us".

== Track listing ==
No.	Title	Writer(s)	Producer(s)	Length
1.	"Bare Witness" (featuring DJ Babu)	R.L. Altman III; Titus Glover; Jason Powers; Christopher Tyson; Ralph James Rice Jr.	Khrysis; Young RJ	2:30
2.	"Lock It Down"	Altman III; Glover; Powers; James Yancey	J Dilla	3:03
3.	"Scheming" (featuring Posdnuos, Phife Dawg and Vice Verse)	Altman III; Glover; Yancey; Kevin Perkins; Rice Jr.	Young RJ	4:15
4.	"Earl Flinn"	Altman III; Glover; Powers; Rice Jr.	Young RJ	3:04
5.	"Faster" (featuring Colin Munroe)	Altman III; Glover; Powers; Colin Munroe; Rice Jr.; Craig Lane	Young RJ; Craig Lane (co.)	3:37
6.	"2000 Beyond" (featuring ?uestlove)	Altman III; Powers; Yancey; Rice Jr.	Young RJ	2:53
7.	"Dance" (featuring AB)	Altman III; Glover; Aaron Abernathy; David West	Supa Dave West	2:45
8.	"Don't Fight the Feeling/Daylight" (featuring Dwele)	Altman III; Glover; Denaun Porter; Abernathy	Mr. Porter	7:24
9.	"Um Um" (featuring 6 Keys)	Altman III; Powers; Takiesha Richardson; Rice Jr.	Young RJ	3:33
10.	"The Set Up"	Altman III; Glover; Powers; Tony Cottrell	Hi-Tek	3:51
11.	"The Reunion, Pt. 2"	Altman III; Glover; Yancey; Rice Jr.	Young RJ	3:09
12.	"Where Do We Go from Here" (featuring Little Brother)	Altman III; Thomas Jones; Phonte Coleman; Rice Jr.	Young RJ	2:52
13.	"We'll Show You" (featuring AB)	Altman III; Glover; Yancey; Abernathy; Rice Jr.	J Dilla; Young RJ (co.)	3:47
Total length:				46:43

No.	Title	Writer(s)	Producer(s)	Length
14.	"Stereo"	Altman III; John Yancey; Rice Jr.; Lane	Young RJ; Craig Lane (co.)
15.	"Dope Man"	Altman III; Glover; Rice Jr.; Lane	Young RJ
16.	"Nitro"	Altman III; Powers; Rice Jr.	Young RJ

Notes

- Tracks 2 and 13 used previously unreleased instrumental tracks by J Dilla.
- Tracks 3 and 6 used previously unreleased J Dilla's vocals.
- Although J Dilla is listed as the main artist on the album cover, he is listed as "featured" artist on the track listing.

== Personnel ==
- R.L. "T3" Altman III – vocals, co-executive producer
- Titus "Baatin" Glover – vocals
- Jason "eLZhi" Powers – vocals
- James "J Dilla" Yancey – vocals (tracks: 3, 6), producer (tracks: 2, 13)
- John "Illa J" Yancey – vocals
- Ralph James "Young RJ" Rice Jr. – vocals, producer (tracks: 1, 3–6, 9, 11, 12, 14–16), co-producer (track 13), recording, mixing, executive producer
- Kelvin "Posdnuos" Mercer – vocals (track 3)
- Malik "Phife Dawg" Taylor – vocals (track 3)
- Kevin "Vice Verse" Perkins – vocals (track 3)
- Colin Munroe – vocals (track 5)
- Aaron "AB" Abernathy – vocals (tracks: 7, 13)
- Andwele "Dwele" Gardner – vocals (track 8)
- Takiesha "6 Keys" Richardson – vocals (track 9)
- Thomas "Big Pooh" Jones – vocals (track 12)
- Phonte Coleman – vocals (track 12)
- Chris "DJ Babu" Oroc – scratches (track 1)
- Sam Beaubien – horns arrangement (track 1), string arrangement (track 12)
- Lauren "L-Boogie" Johnson – percussion (tracks: 3, 5, 9)
- Craig Lane – additional keyboards (tracks: 3, 6, 7, 9), keyboards (tracks: 5, 12), co-producer (tracks: 5, 14)
- Ahmir "Questlove" Thompson – live drums (track 6)
- Michael Mindingall – additional keyboards (track 7)
- DJ Dez – scratches (track 12)
- Vernon D. Hill – additional keyboards (track 13)
- Christopher "Khrysis" Tyson – producer (track 1)
- Supa Dave West – producer (track 7)
- Denaun "Kon Artis" Porter – producer (track 8)
- Tony "Hi-Tek" Cottrell – producer (track 10)
- Paris "Peezy" Johnson – recording, mixing
- Jeff Campo – mastering
- Jay Franco – mastering
- Mario "Khalif" Butterfield – art direction
- DJ Scrap Dirty – A&R
- Timothy Maynor – management

== Charts ==
Chart (2010)	Peak position
US Top R&B/Hip-Hop Albums (Billboard)	37
US Top Rap Albums (Billboard)	21
US Independent Albums (Billboard)	31
