= Big Herk =

American rapper from Detroit, Michigan

- Born: Amery Dennard
- Origin: Detroit, Michigan, U.S.
- Genres: Rap, underground hip hop
- Occupation: Rapper
- Years active: 1997-present
- Label: Rock Bottom Entertainment
- Website: YouTube

Big Herk is an American rapper from Detroit, Michigan.

He started with the Detroit-based rap group Rock Bottom. He left in 2003 and released his debut Guilty As Charged. He was later featured in the movie Project 313. He is featured on Slum Village's Detroit Deli: A Taste of Detroit album featuring MC Breed titled It's On, and Obie Trice's Second Round's on Me album featuring Eminem and Trick-Trick title "There They Go". He was expected to release his first full-length album titled Over Dose in 2013.

Big Herk is a playable character in the video game Def Jam: Icon.

== Discography ==
=== Albums ===
- From The Bottom Up (1997) (with Rock Bottom)
- Alligator City (2000) (with Rock Bottom)
- Who Is Rock Bottom? (2002) (with Rock Bottom)
- Guilty As Charged (2003)
- Over Dose (2013)
- The Bloodline (2016) (With Young Herk)

=== Mixtapes ===
- Still Guilty: Da Undaground LP & DVD (2004)
- Got 'cha Back Ent. Presents... Play Time's Over (2007)

=== Singles ===
- 2003 "Gangsta's Only" Ft. J Nutty
- 2003 "Ima Boss"
- 2003 "M.O.T.O.W.N." Ft. K.D. & J-Nutty
- 2004 "Living Da Life"
- 2004 "Do What U Do"
- 2007 "Playin' 4 Keeps" Ft. Solo & Devious
- 2012 "Trap Goin' Ham"
- 2013 "U Know Da Deal" ft. Young Herk
- 2016 "D thang" ft. Young Herk

=== Appearances ===
- 2002 "Thugology" (Connected Ent. Vol. 1)
- 2002 "All I Know" featuring Fatal, Helluva, & Slimmie Hauffa
- 2003 "Murder City" by Cash Kola featuring MVP
- 2004 "It's On" by Slum Village featuring MC Breed.
- 2005 "Dead Beat Dad (Remix) 5150 featuring Bugz
- 2005 "Spot Life" 5150 featuring Rock Bottom
- 2005 "Rule #1" 5150 featuring Tuff Tone
- 2005 "Ride" by Royce Da 5'9" featuring Juan.
- 2005 "Everywhere We Go" by Tone & Peleboy
- 2006 "There They Go" by Obie Trice featuring Eminem & Trick Trick.
- 2006 "Detroit Stand Up (Remix)" by Esham featuring BO$$, Poe Whosaine, Malik, Al Nuke & Proof (rapper)
- 2008 "Temptation" by Lil Skeeter featuring Dwele.
- 2008 "Can't Hold Me Back" by Awesome Dre featuring Esham, Merciless Amir, Shaggy 2 Dope, & BO$$
- 2008 "Run With Us D-Boyz" by Johnny Saxx featuring Stretch Money & K Deezy
- 2009 "In The Hood" by Mann featuring Truth
- 2010 "Block Niggas" by Nefu Da Boss featuring Lady J
- 2012 "Don't Blow My High" by CityBoyWizzle & Foggs
- 2012 "They Dont Know" by CityBoyWizzle
- 2014 "Detroit Vs. Everybody" (remix) by Eminem, Big Sean, Royce da 5'9, Guilty Simpson, Boldy James, Trick-Trick, Dej Loaf, Danny Brown, and various other artists
- 2020 "Bag Money" by Mr. Way-Better
