= Best Kept Secret (Slum Village album) =

EP by J-88
- Released: July 31, 2000
- Recorded: 1996–2000
- Genre: Hip hop
- Length: 29:11
- Label: Groove Attack
- Producer: Jay Dee; Madlib; IG Culture

J-88 chronology
Fantastic, Vol. 2 (2000)	Best Kept Secret (2000)	Trinity (Past, Present and Future) (2002)

Professional ratings
Review scores
Source	Rating
AllMusic	3/5 stars

Best Kept Secret is an EP by J-88 (an alias for Slum Village). Released prior to Jay Dee's departure from Slum Village, the album has been described as the missing link between the acclaimed Fantastic 1 and Fantastic 2, and also includes a few exclusive remixes by producers Madlib, and IG Culture. Although much of the material was previously unreleased, two of the tracks, "The Look Of Love Pt. 1" and "Keep It On", remain virtually unchanged from the versions found on Fan-Tas-Tic (Vol. 1). Fan-Tas-Tic (Vol. 1) had only been released in very limited quantities at the time and was not available to the larger public.

== Track listing ==
1. From Detroit With Love (Intro) – 0:48
2. The Look Of Love Pt. 1 – 3:38
3. Get It Together – 2:59
4. Stupid Lies – 2:36
5. The Things You Do – 2:38
6. Keep It On – 3:05
7. The Look Of Love Pt. 2 – 3:14
8. Get It Together (Madlib Remix) – 2:47
9. The Things You Do (Madlib Remix) – 3:53
10. Get It Together (IG Culture Basement Jerks Mix) – 4:01
