= Slum Village (album) =

Studio album by Slum Village
- Released: October 25, 2005
- Recorded: RJ Rice (Southfield, MI)
- Genre: Hip-hop
- Length: 47:46
- Label: Barak
- Producer: B.R. Gunna; MoSS; T3

Slum Village chronology
Detroit Deli (A Taste of Detroit) (2004)	Slum Village (2005)	Villa Manifesto EP (2009)

Professional ratings
Review scores
Source	Rating
AllMusic	4/5 stars
HipHopDX	3/5
Now	2/5 Ns
RapReviews	6.5/10

Slum Village is the fifth studio album by American hip-hop group Slum Village. It was released on October 25, 2005, via Barak Records. The recording sessions took place at R.J. Rice Studios in Southfield, Michigan. The album was produced by B.R. Gunna, MoSS, and T3. It features guest appearances from Black Milk, Dwele, J Isaac, Melanie Rutherford, Phat Kat, and Que D.

The release includes a bonus DVD which includes footage on the making of the album as well as an interview with T3 and Elzhi on the group's history. The DVD also features Slum Village's first two music videos "Climax (Girl Shit)" and "Raise It Up" from the album Fantastic, Vol. 2.

The first single from the album was "EZ Up". The song was notable for appearing in a commercial to promote the 2006 Chevrolet HHR and 2006 Chevrolet Impala, albeit with different lyrics.

== Track listing ==
No.	Title	Writer(s)	Length
1.	"Giant"	R.L. Altman III; Jason Powers; Ralph James Rice Jr.; Carl Andrew Broaden	3:17
2.	"Set It"	Altman III; Powers; Curtis Eugene Cross	2:49
3.	"Can I Be Me"	Altman III; Powers; Rice Jr.; Cross	3:34
4.	"Call Me" (featuring Dwele)	Altman III; Powers; Andwele Gardner; Rice Jr.; Cross; Ernest Isley; Marvin Isley; O'Kelly Isley; Ronald Isley; Rudolph Bernard Isley; Christopher H. Jasper	3:51
5.	"05"	Altman III; Powers; Rice Jr.	6:22
6.	"1, 2"	Altman III; Powers; Jason Connoy; Broaden; Rice Jr.	3:57
7.	"Multiply" (featuring Melanie Rutherford)	Altman III; Powers; Melanie Rutherford; Rice Jr.; Raymone Boggues; Ian McDonald; Peter Sinfield; Greg Lake; Michael Giles; Robert Fripp	3:29
8.	"1-800-S-L-U-M"	Altman III; Powers; Rice Jr.	1:55
9.	"Hear This" (featuring Black Milk and Phat Kat)	Altman III; Powers; Cross; Ron Watts	3:29
10.	"Def Do Us"	Altman III; Powers; Rice Jr.	3:46
11.	"Hell Naw!" (featuring Black Milk and Que D.)	Altman III; Powers; Cross; Ernest Toney	3:14
12.	"Ez Up" (featuring J. Isaac)	Altman III; Powers; Rice Jr.; Cross; Gardner	3:32
13.	"Fantastic"	Altman III; Powers; Rice Jr.; Broaden; Titus Printice Glover; James Dewitt Yancey	4:31
Total length:			47:46

Sample credits

- Track 4 contains a sample of "Footsteps in the Dark" as performed by the Isley Brothers.
- Track 7 contains a sample of "I Talk to the Wind" as performed by King Crimson.

== Personnel ==
- R.L. "T3" Altman III – vocals, producer
- Jason "eLZhi" Powers – vocals
- Samiyyah Dixon – background vocals (track 1)
- Andwele "Dwele" Gardner – vocals (track 4)
- Melanie Rutherford – background vocals (track 7)
- Curtis "Black Milk" Cross – vocals (tracks: 9, 11), producer
- Ron "Phat Kat" Watts – vocals (track 9)
- Ernest "Que D." Toney – vocals (track 11)
- J. Isaac Moore – vocals (track 12)
- Carl Broaden – keyboards, co-producer
- Alvin Moore – keyboards
- Tony Womack – horns
- DJ Dez – drums, turntables
- Ralph J. "Young RJ" Rice Jr. – producer, recording, mixing, executive producer
- Jason "MoSS" Connoy – producer
- Sterling Sound – mastering
- Jesper Skou Boelling – photography
- Motorcity – art direction, design

== Charts ==
Chart (2005)	Peak position
US Top R&B/Hip-Hop Albums (Billboard)	80
US Independent Albums (Billboard)	33
