= Subject (album) =

Studio album by Dwele
- Released: May 20, 2003
- Studio: Various: Loft, Studio A Dearborn, Michigan; Music Box Studios, The Global Group Studios, Detroit, Michigan; 916 Music Studios, The Outpost Recording Studio, Van Nuys, California; Blakeslee Recording Company, KOA Recording, Hollywood, California; Sony Music Studios, New York City, New York; A Touch Of Jazz Studios, Philadelphia, Pennsylvania
- Genres: R&B; neo soul
- Length: 1:00:26
- Label: Virgin
- Producers: Ronald "Ron E." Estill; Dwayne Bastiany; Dwele; G-One; Jake and the Phatman; Pete Kuzma; Joint Custody; Eric Roberson (vocal); Kelvin Wooten (co.)

Dwele chronology
Rize (2000)	Subject (2003)	Some Kinda... (2005)

Professional ratings
Review scores
Source	Rating
AllMusic	4/5 stars
Rolling Stone	2/5 stars

Subject is the debut studio album by American musician Dwele. It was released on May 20, 2003 via Virgin Records. Production was mainly handled by Dwele himself, in addition to G-1, Dwayne Bastiany, Jake and the Phatman, Pete Kuzma, Joint Custody, and Ronald "Ron E." Estill, who also served as executive producer together with Timothy Maynor. It features guest appearances from Slum Village and Kanye West. The album peaked at number 108 on the Billboard 200 and number 20 on the Top R&B/Hip-Hop Albums.

== Critical reception ==
Jack Smith of the BBC claimed "Although the tempos never rise above head-nodding, Dwele displays the versatility and scope to his voice (infusing classical jazz and love poetry in the form of an old school balladeer) that few newcomers can match, displaying a crooning style that is far more seasoned and seductive than an army of singers twice his age."

John Bush of AllMusic noted "Mostly self-produced and recorded at his home in Detroit, Subject favors the gauzy beats-and-bliss production style of Slum Village auteur Jay Dee. Though it's a familiar format, it's one that works well as a bed for his vocal style, which uses odd cadences, extended phrasing, multiple layers of vocals, and often his own whispered responses to his main lines."

Del F. Cowie of Exclaim! remarked "Dwele's sound is organically soulful, couched in watery layers of Fender Rhodes keyboards and topped off by the smooth ambience of his spoken word cum rap vocal style. While that first EP entitled Rize, featured musical nuggets that sometimes only lasted a minute and veered into unexpected yet undeniably dope sonic directions, Subject finds Dwele's songwriting adhering closer to traditional song structure."

Christopher Sanders of the Miami New Times wrote "Singer/producer Dwele's debut album, Subject, is an exploration of the many idiosyncrasies that exist between lovers, set to a lush backdrop that is neither annoyingly contrived nor forcefully retro. His subtle, smooth numbers utilize an array of sounds and instruments."

PopMatters found "If there is anything transcendent about Dwele, like D’Angelo or any of his new soul predecessors, it’s that he is genuinely talented and, above all, refreshing. Subject, like Brown Sugar, is the type of album that can and probably will be played on repeat without wearing on any music listener’s nerves — if anything, it’s inspiring during each rotation."

== Track listing ==
No.	Title	Writer(s)	Producer(s)	Length
1.	"Poppa Yo (Intro)"	Andwele Gardner	Dwele	2:37
2.	"Truth"	Gardner	Dwele	3:56
3.	"Find a Way"	Gardner; George Archie	G-One	4:09
4.	"Twuneanunda"	Gardner	Dwele	3:21
5.	"A.N.G.E.L. (Interlude)"	Gardner	Dwele	2:19
6.	"Day at a Time"	Gardner	Dwele	4:35
7.	"Subject"	Gardner	Dwele	4:01
8.	"Sho Ya Right"	Gardner; Bobby Ozuna; Glenn Standridge; Kelvin Wooten	Jake and the Phatman; Kelvin Wooten (co.)	4:17
9.	"Money Don't Mean a Thing"	Gardner; Alfonzo Hunter; Ron Estill	Ronald "Ron E." Estill	3:30
10.	"Hold On"	Gardner; Dwayne Bastiany; Eric Roberson	Dwayne Bastiany; Eric Roberson (voc.)	3:42
11.	"Kick Out of You"	Gardner	Dwele	4:07
12.	"Without You"	Gardner; Pete Kuzma	Dwele; Pete Kuzma	4:07
13.	"Whoomp (Interlude)"	Gardner	Dwele	3:36
14.	"Lady at Mahogany"	Gardner	Dwele	4:07
15.	"A.N.G.E.L. (Reprise)" (featuring Slum Village)	Gardner; R.L. Altman III; Titus Glover	Dwele	3:50
16.	"Let Your Hair Down"	Gardner; Mischke Butler; Anthony Nance; A. VanDerVeer	Joint Custody	4:12
17.	"Hold On (Remix) (featuring Kanye West)"	Gardner; Dwayne Bastiany; West; Eric Roberson	Dwayne Bastiany; Eric Roberson (voc.)	4:34
Total length:				1:05:10

== Personnel ==
- Dwele: lead and background vocals, drum programming, bass, guitar, keyboards, Fender Rhodes, trumpet, flugelhorn
- Jake and the Phatman: drum programming, turntables, percussion
- George "G-One" Archie: drum programming, synthesizers, Fender Rhodes
- Dave Foreman: guitar
- Kelvin Wooten: bass, guitar
- Todd Fairall, Chris Puram, Michelle Romero, Eric Roberson, Nikki Holliwood: Recording engineer
- Ronald Estill, Serban Ghenea, Kirk Yano, Dylan Koski-Budabin, Jean-Marie Horvat: mixing
- Tom Coyne: mastering
- Ronald Estill, Timothy Maynor: Executive producer
- Amanda Friedman, Andrew Dosunmu: Photography
- Bento Design: Art direction & design

== Charts ==
=== Weekly charts ===
Chart (2003)	Peak position
US Billboard 200	108
US Top R&B/Hip-Hop Albums (Billboard)	20
UK R&B Albums (Official Charts)	22

=== Year-end charts ===
Chart (2003)	Position
US Top R&B/Hip-Hop Albums (Billboard)	93
