= Trinity (Past, Present and Future) =

Studio album by Slum Village
- Released: August 13, 2002
- Recorded: 2001–2002
- Studio: RJ Rice Studios (Farmington Hills, MI); Studio A (Dearborn Heights, MI); The Studio (Philadelphia, PA)
- Genre: Hip hop
- Length: 1:08:32
- Label: Capitol
- Producer: Black Milk; Ess Man; Hi-Tek; J Dilla; Karriem Riggins; Scott Storch; T3; Waajeed; Young R.J.

Slum Village chronology
Best Kept Secret (2000)	Trinity (Past, Present and Future) (2002)	Detroit Deli (A Taste of Detroit) (2004)

Singles from Trinity (Past, Present and Future)
- 1. "Tainted" Released: July 2, 2002; 2. "Disco" Released: November 5, 2002

Trinity (Past, Present and Future) is the third studio album by American hip hop group Slum Village. It was released on August 13, 2002, via Capitol Records. The recording sessions took place at RJ Rice Studios in Farmington Hills, Studio A in Dearborn Heights, and The Studio in Philadelphia. The album was produced by T3, Waajeed, J Dilla, Karriem Riggins, Young RJ, Black Milk, Ess Man, Hi-Tek, and Scott Storch.

The album peaked at number 20 on the Billboard 200 and number 5 on the Top R&B/Hip-Hop Albums in the United States. Its lead single, Dwele-assisted "Tainted", made it to number 87 on the US Billboard Hot 100.

== Overview ==
Trinity marked the group's first shift away from its original lineup, due to J Dilla's departure following Fantastic, Vol. 2, to pursue a solo career. Longtime affiliate Elzhi, joined the remaining members; a move which was initially disapproved by hardcore fans, but with time has been accepted, and even praised.

Another major change was Slum Village's new recording home, Capitol Records, which would subsequently cause problems for the group. Although the first single "Tainted" was a respectable success, the album received poor promotion thereafter.

With the production element of Fantastic, Vol. 2 receiving the most acclaim the last time around, filling Dilla's shoes was always going to be a hard task for even the most competent trackmaster, but the team assorted for Trinity (including Dilla himself) didn't stray too far from the feel of the previous album. The beats are, perhaps, less jazzy and subtle but even further left of field on tracks like the aptly titled "Insane", and the first of three Dilla contributions, "One". The group's chemistry, while not as freeflowing and snappy as before, remained intact, and there seemed to be a more concentrated effort by each member to match each other's flows and subjects on the same songs.

While on tour to support the album, Baatin began to experience health problems, which led to a diagnosis of schizophrenia. He was soon kicked out of the group while still in the hospital, which greatly upset him. The dispute was later resolved, and Baatin reunited with T3 and Elzhi in 2008, before dying of a suspected drug overdose in 2009.

== Critical reaction ==
Professional ratings
Aggregate scores
Source	Rating
Metacritic	59/100
Review scores
Source	Rating
AllMusic	3.5/5 stars
Alternative Press	2/5 stars
HipHopDX	3.5/5
Pitchfork	4.5/10
RapReviews	5/10
Q	2/5 stars
Rolling Stone	3/5 stars
The Village Voice	(dud)

Fans were split between those welcoming the addition of Elzhi and those who were against it and felt that J Dilla was too instrumental in the group's previously established identity to be replaced.

Trinity (Past, Present and Future) was met with mixed or average reviews from music critics. At Metacritic, which assigns a normalized rating out of 100 to reviews from mainstream publications, the album received an average score of 59, based on twelve reviews. A few critics, however, wrote favorable reviews and gave praise for the group's original song concepts as well as Elzhi's lyrical abilities.

== Track listing ==
No.	Title	Writer(s)	Producer(s)	Length
1.	"Intro 1"		T3	0:32
2.	"Intro 2"	Jason Powers; Titus Glover; RL Altman III; Robert O'Bryant	Waajeed	2:26
3.	"Insane"	Powers; Glover; O'Bryant	Waajeed	2:37
4.	"What Is This"	Powers; Glover; Altman III; Curtis Cross; Dani Siciliano; Matthew Herbert	Black Milk; T3^{[c]}; Young RJ^{[c]}	2:25
5.	"Tainted" (featuring Dwele)	Powers; Glover; Altman III; Andwele Gardner; Karriem Riggins	Karriem Riggins	4:26
6.	"La La"	Powers; Glover; Altman III; O'Bryant; Ralph J. Rice Jr.; Vernon D. Hill; Michel Colombier	Waajeed; T3^{[c]}; Young RJ^{[c]}; Vernon D. Hill^{[c]}	4:52
7.	"All-Ta-Ment"	Powers; Glover; Altman III; Rice Jr.; Marvin Gaye	T3; Young RJ^{[c]}	3:42
8.	"Disco"	Powers; Altman III; Ernest "Que D" Toney	T3; Young RJ^{[c]}; Vernon D. Hill^{[c]}	3:05
9.	"Trinity (Interlude)"	Powers; Glover; Altman III	Black Milk	2:09
10.	"One"	Powers; Glover; Altman III; James Yancey	Jay Dee	3:50
11.	"Hoes"	Glover; Altman III; Yancey	Jay Dee	3:28
12.	"Star (Interlude)" (featuring T. Banks)	Altman III; O'Bryant	T3	0:22
13.	"Star" (featuring Dwele)	Powers; Glover; Altman III; O'Bryant	Waajeed	3:20
14.	"Slumber"	Powers; Glover; Altman III; Tony Cottrell	Hi-Tek	4:10
15.	"Let's"	Powers; Glover; Altman III; Yancey	Jay Dee	5:18
16.	"S.O.U.L."	Powers; Glover; Altman III; Riggins	Karriem Riggins	3:25
17.	"80's Skit"	Powers; Glover; Altman III	Slum Village	1:48
18.	"Unisex"	Altman III; Rice Jr.	T3; Young RJ	1:49
19.	"Love U Hate"	Powers; Glover; Altman III; Shelton Rivers; Claude Bolling	Ess Man	3:38
20.	"Get Live"	Powers; Glover; Altman III; Scott Storch	Scott Storch	4:43
21.	"Harmony"	Powers; Glover; Altman III; Riggins; Hen Elliott	Karriem Riggins	3:28
22.	"Who Are We (Interlude)"	Powers; Glover; Altman III; O'Bryant	T3	1:05
23.	Untitled			0:04
24.	Untitled			0:04
25.	Untitled			0:04
26.	Untitled			0:07
27.	"Fall in Love" (featuring Samiyyah)	Samiyyah Dixon; Alice Cooper; Dennis Dunaway; Glen Buxton; Michael Bruce; Neal Smith	Jay Dee^{[o]}; T3^{[r]}; Ess Band^{[r]}	1:35
Total length:				1:08:32

Notes

- ^{^[c]} signifies a co-producer.
- ^{^[o]} signifies an original producer.
- ^{^[r]} signifies a remix producer.
- Tracks 23 to 26 are a few seconds of silence.
- Track 27 is a bonus track often listed as track 23.
- In the liner notes, Black Milk was originally credited under the name Curtis "Nottyhead" Cross.

== Charts ==
Chart (2002)	Peak position
US Billboard 200	20
US Top R&B/Hip-Hop Albums (Billboard)	5
