= Tainted (song) =

2002 single by Slum Village featuring Dwele

Single by Slum Village featuring Dwele

from the album Trinity (Past, Present and Future)
- Released: July 2, 2002
- Genre: Hip hop
- Length: 4:27
- Label: Capitol
- Songwriter(s): Jason Powers; Titus Glover; R.L. Altman III; Andwele Gardner; Karriem Riggins
- Producer(s): Riggins

Slum Village singles chronology
"Players" (2000)	"Tainted" (2002)	"Disco" (2002)

Dwele singles chronology
"Tainted" (2002)	"Find a Way" (2003)

Music video
- "Tainted" on YouTube

"Tainted" is a song by American hip hop group Slum Village, released on July 2, 2002 as the lead single from their third studio album Trinity (Past, Present and Future) (2002). It features American singer Dwele. Produced by Karriem Riggins, the song contains a sample of "The Jam" by Graham Central Station.

== Background ==
T3 of Slum Village said that the song is about "good and bad relationships — tainted and untainted. My verse is about my girl and I. Baatin's [verse] is about the industry and the stuff we went through. When you put all those together, that's basically the concept of 'Tainted'." He stated that Slum Village chose the song for the lead single of Trinity (Past, Present and Future) because they "wanted to start off from where we left", describing the song as "like the old, feel-good Slum soul-type joint. We wanted to start from that base before we take you to another plateau."

== Composition and critical reception ==
Steve 'Flash' Juon of RapReviews described the song "sounds like a laid back groove by The Roots being mixed with the smooth but slightly hardcore vibes of 'Midnight Marauders'." Pitchfork wrote of the song, "With a chill vibe and harmonious R&B; crooning, it's more than a little reminiscent of Fantastic's "Players". The lyrics are clichéd but forgivable, and although the emcees' flows are nothing memorable, they aren't obtrusive, either. Off the relative strength of that single, one might suppose that Slum Village has managed to survive the departure of their most talented member." Reviewing the album for AllMusic, John Bush called the song "one of the best on tap here".

== Charts ==
Chart (2002)	Peak position
US Billboard Hot 100	87
US Hot R&B/Hip-Hop Songs (Billboard)	31
US Hot Rap Songs (Billboard)	20
