= Wayne Fontes Music =

Studio album by Marv Won
- Released: January 1, 2010
- Genre: Underground hip hop
- Length: 45:01
- Label: Runyon Ave.
- Producer: Mr. Porter; House Shoes; Nameless

Marv Won chronology
Way of the Won (2009)	Wayne Fontes Music (2010)	Heavy Is the Head... (2012)

Wayne Fontes Music is a studio album by American underground rapper and producer Marv Won, released January 1, 2010, a month after his previous work Way Of The Won. The album was named after Detroit Lions head coach Wayne Fontes the way Marv spits lyrics on it.

In 2009, Marv released music video for DJ Houseshoes produced track "Stomp", directed by Mario Butterfield, with cameo appearances by The Fat Killahz, Tre Little, T3 (of Slum Village), Quest MCody, Danny Brown, Mike Luke and Big Proof (by added footage).

In 2010, Marv and Rio Data released another video from the album, for Nathaniel Hall and Che Patterson produced "Totally Awesome" (named after the gem of a Tracy Morgan sample from a movie of the same name that kicks off the track), directed by Scrill Gates and Mario "Khalif" Butterfield, features cameos by Fatt Father, Miz Korona, Guilty Simpson, Kat, DJ Bet, Big Tone, Jimi Moto, Mike Luke, Supa Emcee, Lovjoy, Ron Dance, Darren Brown, Chips, Moe Dirdee, Burn Rubber Rick, Ro Spit, Magnetic among others

== Track listing ==
No.	Title	Length
1.	"Intro"	2:06
2.	"Feel It"	3:00
3.	"Get It In"	2:43
4.	"What I'm On"	3:20
5.	"Lay It On The Line" (featuring Dwele)	3:13
6.	"Stomp"	2:35
7.	"You Ain't A Soldier"	2:54
8.	"Mad At Me" (featuring Dwele)	3:22
9.	"Do My Thang"	3:31
10.	"Totally Awesome" (featuring Rio Data)	3:17
11.	"Be Careful"	3:04
12.	"Lay Down" (featuring Shim-E-Bango and Fatt Father)	3:40
13.	"Rock -A- Bye"	3:49
14.	"Ways To Go"	3:27
Total length:		45:01
