= Find a Way (Dwele song) =

2003 single by Dwele

Single by Dwele

from the album Subject
- B-side: "Truth"
- Released: April 2003
- Genre: R&B
- Length: 4:09
- Label: Virgin
- Songwriters: Andwele Gardner; George Archie
- Producer: G-One

Dwele singles chronology
"Tainted" (2002)	"Find a Way" (2003)	"Money Don't Mean a Thing" (2003)

Music video
- "Find a Way" on YouTube

"Find a Way" is a song by American singer Dwele and the lead single from his debut studio album Subject (2003). It was produced by G-One.

== Background ==
In a 2012 interview with YouKnowIGotSoul.com, Dwele recalled his original ideas for the song and the process of composing it:

I was in L.A. working with G-One and I remember I had a portable CD player and I had burnt a song in the studio and had it in my portable CD player in my headphones on the balcony of my hotel room under palm trees. I had to write this song, this was the jump off song. I just kinda reflected on something that I was going through at the time. I had got a phone call from a girl that I hadn't talked to in a minute and that was fresh in my brain. I wrote that actually in L.A. under palm trees, beautiful weather, and went in and cut the song the next day. In the process of recording the song, I remember saying to G-One and he always brings it up, I stopped the track and said "Man, I don't even wanna be a singer man, I want to be a rapper!" He was like "What! D man you're crazy man, D man if you sing, you're going to have all of the ladies!" I didn't even want to do it and I fought with him and it took us a long time to even finish that song. I was fighting but everything worked out and I'm glad I'm still singing now because I love ladies!

== Content ==
The song finds Dwele singing about one trying to restore the love that he and his romantic partner once had for each other.

== Critical reception ==
In his review of Subject, John Bush of AllMusic described "Find a Way" and "Money Don't Mean a Thing" as "intelligent, sensitive jams, but they make it clear that Dwele's talents don't tend to the anthemic." Lynzee Mychael of Michigan Chronicle called the song "a tune that embodied the essence of Detroit's ballroom culture while oozing a sense of sophistication and allure."

== Charts ==
Chart (2003)	Peak position
US Billboard Hot 100	93
US Hot R&B/Hip-Hop Songs (Billboard)	42
