= Detroit Deli (A Taste of Detroit) =

Studio album by Slum Village
- Released: June 29, 2004
- Studio: RJ Rice Studios (Southfield, MI); McNasty Studios (Canton, MI); Larrabee Studios North (Los Angeles, CA)
- Genre: Hip hop
- Length: 45:41
- Label: Capitol
- Producer: B.R. Gunna; J Dilla; Kanye West; T3

Slum Village chronology
Trinity (Past, Present and Future) (2002)	Detroit Deli (A Taste of Detroit) (2004)	Slum Village (2005)

Singles from Detroit Deli (A Taste of Detroit)
- 1. "Selfish" Released: March 16, 2004

Detroit Deli (A Taste of Detroit) is the fourth studio album by American hip hop group Slum Village. It was released on June 29, 2004, through Capitol Records, making it their second and final album for the label. The album was produced by B.R. Gunna, T3, J Dilla, and Kanye West. It features guest appearances from Dwele, MC Breed, Melanie Rutherford, Big Herk, John Legend, Kanye West, Ol' Dirty Bastard, Phat Kat, and former member J Dilla. Member Baatin parted ways with the group in 2003 due to health complications.

The album peaked at number 37 on the Billboard 200, number 6 on the Top R&B/Hip-Hop Albums and number 4 on the Top Rap Albums in the United States. Its only single, "Selfish", made it to number 55 on the US Billboard Hot 100.

== Overview ==
After Baatin's departure from Slum Village, there was a lot of pressure upon the group to deliver a solid follow-up to their previous album, Trinity. The lead single from Detroit Deli was "Selfish", produced by and featuring Kanye West, with John Legend providing vocals during the chorus. The song was a moderate hit and the group's highest-charting single, partly as a result of Kanye West's mainstream popularity. The album received a fairly solid reception, but further promotion from Capitol Records stopped short of a second single or music video. Some of their longtime fans viewed the collaboration with West as a ploy for mainstream attention. The group would acknowledge this somewhat, on their following album, 2005's Slum Village.

The song "Reunion", was originally supposed to feature all four members of Slum Village, but Baatin was absent from the final version.

A lot of people think that's a Dilla track, but it was produced by Black Milk, Dilla is just rapping on it. Basically what happened was me and [producer] Young RJ went over Dilla's house, playing joints for him off the album 'cause we wanted to work with him on it. We played a couple joints and he picked to rap on that one. Originally it was supposed to be me, him, Baatin and Elzhi, but Baatin at the time wasn't feeling doing anything Slum Village.

Me and Elzhi already had our verses, then Dilla put his "rep mo' D than 12 Eminems" verse down, then Elzhi said, "You know what, I'ma keep it real. I'ma tell people what really happened with Baatin cause they lookin at us like, 'T3 kicked Baatin out'". I didn't kick him out, he left the group. Elzhi wanted to tell the truth and he did it. That's when he put his "unlawful demons" verse down. He called Baatin up maybe like a week after he did it and was still asking him to get on the song, but Baatin never did.

It was supposed to be four of us but Baatin was going through his whole struggle. I'm kind of mad that we never got to make a reunion LP, 'cause me and Dilla always talked about doing it. It's kind of upsetting that we didn't get to close the Slum Village chapter like that. Now it's at a point like, where do we go from here?

— T3

== Critical reception ==
Professional ratings
Aggregate scores
Source	Rating
Metacritic	67/100
Review scores
Source	Rating
AllMusic	3.5/5 stars
Now	3/5 Ns
Pitchfork	6.1/10
RapReviews	7.5/10
Rolling Stone	2/5 stars

Detroit Deli (A Taste of Detroit) was met with generally favourable reviews from music critics. At Metacritic, which assigns a normalized rating out of 100 to reviews from mainstream publications, the album received an average score of 67, based on six reviews.

AllMusic's John Bush called the album "a parade of digital R&B jams that skillfully navigate the divide between cutting-edge headphone productions and bumping club tracks". Nathan Rabin of The A.V. Club called it "a surprisingly solid disc characterized by the top-notch production that has always been the group's saving grace". Raymond Fiore of Entertainment Weekly found the album "impresses most with production prowess", adding "...if only rappers T3 and Elzhi had the personality to match the enticing soundscapes". In his mixed review for Rolling Stone, Christian Hoard resumed: "long on verbosity but short on personality".

== Track listing ==
No.	Title	Writer(s)	Producer(s)	Length
1.	"Zoom" (featuring Phat Kat)	R.L. Altman III; Jason Powers; Ron Watts; Curtis Eugene Cross; Ralph J. Rice Jr.	B.R. Gunna	2:54
2.	"Do You" (featuring MC Breed)	Altman III; Powers; Eric Breed; James Dewitt Yancey; Roger Troutman	J Dilla	3:36
3.	"Dirty" (featuring Ol' Dirty Bastard)	Altman III; Powers; Russell Jones; Cross; Rice Jr.	B.R. Gunna	3:37
4.	"Late 80's Skit"	Altman III; Ernest Toney; Cross; Rice Jr.	B.R. Gunna	1:09
5.	"Selfish" (featuring Kanye West and John Legend)	Altman III; Powers; Kanye West; Aretha Franklin	Kanye West	3:45
6.	"Closer" (featuring Dwele)	Altman III; Powers; Andwele Gardner; Rice Jr.; Ernest Isley; Marvin Isley; O'Kelly Isley; Ronald Isley; Rudolph Bernard Isley; Christopher H. Jasper	T3; Young RJ	5:00
7.	"Old Girl/Shining Star" (featuring Melanie Rutherford)	Altman III; Powers; Melanie Rutherford; Cross; Rice Jr.	B.R. Gunna	3:55
8.	"Keep Holding On" (featuring Melanie Rutherford)	Altman III; Powers; Rutherford; Cross; Rice Jr.	B.R. Gunna	3:39
9.	"It's On" (featuring MC Breed and Big Herk)	Altman III; Powers; Breed; Amery Dennard; Cross; Rice Jr.	B.R. Gunna	3:44
10.	"The Hours"	Altman III; Powers; Cross; Rice Jr.	B.R. Gunna	2:24
11.	"Things We Do"	Altman III; Powers; Cross; Rice Jr.	B.R. Gunna	3:22
12.	"Count the Ways" (featuring Dwele)	Altman III; Powers; Rice Jr.	T3; Young RJ	4:33
13.	"Reunion"	Altman III; Powers; Yancey; Cross; Rice Jr.	B.R. Gunna	4:03
Total length:				45:41

Notes

- Ol' Dirty Bastard is credited as 'Dirt McGirt' on track 3.

== Personnel ==
- R.L. "T3" Altman III – vocals, producer (tracks: 6, 12)
- Jason "eLZhi" Powers – vocals
- James "J Dilla" Yancey – vocals (track 13), producer (track 2)
- Ron "Phat Kat" Watts – vocals (track 1)
- Eric Breed – vocals (tracks: 2, 9)
- Russell "Ol' Dirty Bastard" Jones – vocals (track 3)
- Kanye West – vocals & producer (track 5)
- John Roger Stephens – vocals (track 5)
- Andwele "Dwele" Gardner – vocals (tracks: 6, 12)
- Melanie Rutherford – vocals (tracks: 7, 8, 10)
- Amery "Big Herk" Dennard – vocals (track 9)
- Curtis "Black Milk" Cross – additional vocals (tracks: 1, 10, 13), producer (tracks: 1, 3, 4, 7–11, 13)
- Ernest "Que D." Toney – additional vocals (track 8), backing vocals (track 10)
- Pook Bear – additional vocals (track 8)
- Vernon D. Hill – keyboards (tracks: 6, 11)
- Lorenzo Ferguson – keyboards (track 6)
- La France – guitar (track 8)
- Andrew Mayer "DJ Haircut" Cohen – scratches (track 11)
- Valdez – keyboards (track 12)
- Alvin Moore – keyboards (track 13)
- Ralph James "Young R.J." Rice Jr. – producer (tracks: 1, 3, 4, 6–13), executive producer
- Wendy Goldstein – A&R

== Charts ==
Chart (2004)	Peak position
French Albums (SNEP)	199
US Billboard 200	37
US Top R&B/Hip-Hop Albums (Billboard)	6
US Top Rap Albums (Billboard)	4
