= Yes! (Slum Village album) =

Studio album by Slum Village
- Released: June 16, 2015
- Studio: RJ Rice Studios (Farmington Hills, MI)
- Genre: Hip hop
- Length: 42:15
- Label: Ne'Astra Music Group
- Producers: J Dilla; Young RJ

Slum Village chronology
Evolution (2013)	Yes! (2015)	F.U.N. (2024)

Singles from Yes!
- 1. "Yes Yes" Released: February 18, 2014; 2. "Push It Along" Released: May 6, 2015

Professional ratings
Review scores
Source	Rating
AllHipHop	8/10
AllMusic	3/5 stars
Exclaim!	8/10
HipHopDX	3.5/5
RapReviews	7/10

Yes! is the eighth studio album by studio album by American hip hop group Slum Village. It was released on June 16, 2015, via Yancey Media and Ne'Astra Music Group. Recording sessions took place at RJ Rice Studios in Farmington Hills. Production was handled by members Jay Dee and Young RJ. It features guest appearances from Bilal, BJ the Chicago Kid, De La Soul, Jon Connor, J. Ivy and Phife Dawg.

== Background ==
The 12-track LP features nine songs produced or co-produced posthumously by the late member J Dilla. Vocals of late members J Dilla and Baatin were also placed on the album. Yes! also features appearances from De La Soul, Phife, Black Milk, Frank Nitt, Bilal and J Dilla's younger brother Illa J.

== Track listing ==
No.	Title	Writer(s)	Producer(s)	Length
1.	"Intro"	James Yancey	Jay Dee	0:37
2.	"Love Is" (featuring Bilal)	James Yancey; R.L. Altman III; John Yancey; Ralph Rice II	Illa J; Young RJ	3:38
3.	"Tear It Down" (featuring Jon Connor)	James Yancey; Altman III; Jon Kevin Freeman Jr.; Rice II	Jay Dee; Young RJ	3:47
4.	"Bonafide"			2:43
5.	"Expressive" (featuring BJ the Chicago Kid)	James Yancey; Altman III; John Yancey; Bryan Sledge; Rice II	Jay Dee; Young RJ	3:29
6.	"Push It Along" (featuring Phife Dawg)	Altman III; Rice II	Young RJ	3:03
7.	"Windows" (featuring J. Ivy)	James Yancey; Altman III; Rice II		3:46
8.	"Yes Yes"	James Yancey	Jay Dee	3:51
9.	"Right Back" (featuring De La Soul)	James Yancey; Altman III; Kelvin Mercer; Rice II	Jay Dee; Young RJ	2:30
10.	"Where We Come From"	Altman III; Rice II	Young RJ	4:07
11.	"Big City"			3:23
12.	"What We Have"	James Yancey; Altman III; John Yancey; Kameron Corvet; Rice II	Illa J; Jay Dee; Young RJ	4:16
13.	"Just Like a Test"			3:05
Total length:				42:15

Notes

- J Dilla's vocals and instrumental beats and Baatin's vocals recorded in 1994–1995.

Sample credits

- "Expressive" contains a sample of "Tom's Diner", by Suzanne Vega.
- "Push It Along" contains a sample of "Push It Along", by A Tribe Called Quest.
