= Greater Than One (album) =

Studio album by Dwele
- Released: August 28, 2012
- Genre: R&B
- Length: 48:19
- Label: RT; eOne
- Producer: Dwele; G-One; Mike City; Prince "BikMagic" Damons; Rek

Dwele chronology
W.ants W.orld W.omen (2010)	Greater Than One (2012)

Professional ratings
Review scores
Source	Rating
AllMusic	3.5/5 stars
Exclaim!	8/10
PopMatters	6/10

Greater Than One is the fifth studio album by American musician Dwele. It was released on August 28, 2012, via RT Music Group/eOne Music. Production was mainly handled by Dwele himself, in addition to Mike City, G-1, Prince "BikMagic" Damons and Rek. It features guest appearances from Monica Blaire, Black Milk, J. Tait, L'Renee and Raheem DeVaughn. The album peaked at number 30 on the Billboard 200 and number 9 on the Top R&B/Hip-Hop Albums, selling 11,000 copies in its first week of sales.

== Track listing ==
No.	Title	Writer(s)	Producer(s)	Length
1.	"Greater Than One Less Than Three"	Andwele Gardner	Dwele	1:12
2.	"Going Leaving"	Gardner	Dwele	3:54
3.	"Takes 2 2 Tango"	Gardner	Dwele	3:58
4.	"What You Gotta Do" (featuring Raheem DeVaughn)	Gardner	Dwele	4:43
5.	"What Profit"	Michael Flowers	Mike City	3:31
6.	"Obey"	Gardner	Dwele	5:23
7.	"This Love"	Prince Damons	BikMagic	3:19
8.	"Must Be" (featuring Black Milk, J. Tait and L'Renee)	Gardner	Dwele	4:14
9.	"Swank" (featuring Monica Blaire)	Gardner	Dwele	3:54
10.	"Patrick Ronald" (featuring Monica Blaire)	Gardner	Dwele	3:57
11.	"Special"	Flowers	Mike City	3:39
12.	"Love Triangle"	Gardner	G-One; Rek	3:22
13.	"Frankly My Dear (I'm Bennett I Ain't Innit)"	Gardner	Dwele	3:13
Total length:				48:19

== Personnel ==
- Andwele "Dwele" Gardner – vocals, producer (tracks: 1–4, 6, 8–10, 13)
- Raheem DeVaughn – vocals (track 4)
- Curtis "Black Milk" Cross – vocals (track 8)
- James Tait – vocals (track 8)
- L'Renee – vocals (track 8)
- Blaire White – vocals (tracks: 9, 10)
- Michael "Mike City" Flowers – producer & arranger (tracks: 5, 11)
- Prince "BikMagic" Damons – producer (track 7)
- George "G-One" Archie – producer (track 12)
- Rek – producer (track 12)
- Todd Fairall – mixing
- Ronald "Ron E." Estill – mixing
- Eric Morgeson – mastering

== Charts ==
Chart performance for Greater Than One
Chart (2012)	Peak position
US Billboard 200	30
US Top R&B/Hip-Hop Albums (Billboard)	9
US Independent Albums (Billboard)	6
