= Some Kinda... =

Studio album by Dwele
- Released: October 4, 2005
- Recorded: 2004–2005
- Studio: Modat Studios (Detroit, MI); Studio A (Dearborn Heights, MI); Waynee Boy Studios (Royal Oak, MI); Planet 2 Planet Studios (New York, NY); 916 Music Studios (Hollywood, CA); Unsung Studios (Sherman Oaks, CA)
- Genre: R&B; neo soul
- Length: 59:15
- Label: Virgin Records
- Producer: Ronald "Ron E." Estill (exec.); Timothy Maynor (exec.); Dwele; G-One; J Dilla; Mike City

Dwele chronology
Subject (2003)	Some Kinda... (2005)	...Sketches of a Man (2008)

Professional ratings
Review scores
Source	Rating
AllMusic	4/5 stars
Now	NN/NNNNN
PopMatters	7/10
Vibe	3/5 stars

Some Kinda... is the second studio album by American musician Dwele. It was released on October 4, 2005 via Virgin Records. Recording sessions took place at Modat Studios in Detroit, Studio A in Dearborn Heights, Waynee Boy Studios in Royal Oak, Planet 2 Planet Studios in New York, 916 Music Studios in Hollywood, and Unsung Studios in Sherman Oaks. Production was mainly handled by Dwele himself, in addition to G-1, J Dilla and Mike City. It features guest appearances from Antwan Gardner, Boney James, Poppa Yo and Slum Village. The album peaked at number 54 on the Billboard 200 and number 10 on the Top R&B/Hip-Hop Albums.

== Track listing ==
No.	Title	Writer(s)	Producer(s)	Length
1.	"Continued/Holla"	Andwele Gardner	Dwele	5:10
2.	"A Pimp's Dream"	Gardner	Dwele	4:34
3.	"Know Your Name"	Gardner; George Archie	G-One	4:17
4.	"My Lova/Movement"	Gardner	Dwele	6:25
5.	"Flapjacks"	Gardner	Dwele	3:36
6.	"Caught Up"	Gardner	Dwele	1:13
7.	"Weekend Love"	Gardner	Dwele	3:44
8.	"Lay It Down"	Gardner	Dwele	4:41
9.	"I Think I Love U"	Michael Flowers	Mike City	3:41
10.	"Continuation"	Gardner	Dwele	0:43
11.	"Keep On" (featuring Slum Village)	Gardner; Jason Powers; R.L. Altman III; James Yancey; Lonnie Lynn	J Dilla	3:37
12.	"Some Kinda Prelude (...and So It Is)" (featuring Poppa Yo)	Gardner	Dwele	1:09
13.	"Some Kinda" (featuring Antwan Gardner)	Gardner	Dwele	5:14
14.	"Wake the Baby" (featuring Boney James)	Gardner; James Oppenheim	Dwele	3:57
15.	"Old Lovas"	Gardner	Dwele	7:14
Total length:				59:15

== Charts ==
Chart performance for Some Kinda...
Chart (2005)	Peak position
US Billboard 200	54
US Top R&B/Hip-Hop Albums (Billboard)	10
