= W.ants W.orld W.omen =

Studio album by Dwele
- Released: June 29, 2010
- Recorded: 2009–10
- Studio: The Loft (Detroit, MI); Durt Factory (Norfolk, VA); 916 Studios (Universal City, CA); Unsung Studios (Sherman Oaks, CA)
- Genre: R&B
- Length: 55:30
- Label: RT; E1
- Producer: Ronald "Ron E." Estill (exec.); Timothy Maynor (exec.); Dwele; G-One; Mike City; Nottz

Dwele chronology
The Dresden Soul Symphony (2008)	W.ants W.orld W.omen (2010)	Greater Than One (2012)

Singles from W.ants W.orld W.omen
- 1. "What's Not To Love" Released: 2010; 2. "I Wanna" Released: July 22, 2010

Professional ratings
Review scores
Source	Rating
AllMusic	3.5/5 stars
Billboard	4.5/5 stars

W.ants W.orld W.omen is the fourth studio album by American musician Dwele. It was released on June 29, 2010 via RT Music Groupp/E1 Music. Recording sessions took place at the Loft in Detroit, at the Durt Factory in Norfolk, at 916 Studios in Universal City, and at Unsung Studios in Sherman Oaks. Production was mainly handled by Dwele himself, in addition to G-1, Mike City and Nottz. It features guest appearances from David Banner, DJ Quik, Lloyd Dwayne, Kindra Parker, Monica Blaire, Raheem DeVaughn and Slum Village. The album peaked at number 28 on the Billboard 200 and number 9 on the Top R&B/Hip-Hop Albums.

== Track listing ==
No.	Title	Writer(s)	Producer(s)	Length
1.	"Wants (Intro)" (featuring Kindra Parker)	Andwele Gardner	Dwele	1:20
2.	"I Wish"	Gardner; Dominick Lamb	Nottz	3:07
3.	"Grown"	Gardner; George Archie	G-One	3:48
4.	"Dodgin' Your Phone / Smoke Up the Back (Interlude)" (featuring David Banner, Raheem DeVaughn and Nina313)	Gardner; Lavell Crump	Dwele	5:39
5.	"Dim the Lights" (featuring Raheem DeVaughn)	Gardner	Dwele	4:32
6.	"World (Intro)" (featuring Kindra Parker)	Gardner	Dwele	1:07
7.	"How I Deal" (featuring Slum Village)	Gardner; Jason Powers; R.L. Altman III	Dwele	3:42
8.	"Hangover"	Gardner	Dwele	3:06
9.	"My People"	Gardner	Dwele	4:27
10.	"Detroit Sunrise" (featuring Monica Blaire and Lloyd Dwayne)	Gardner; Blaire White	Dwele	3:36
11.	"Women (Intro)" (featuring Kindra Parker)	Gardner	Dwele	0:40
12.	"I Understand"	Gardner	Dwele	4:34
13.	"Love You Right"	Michael Flowers	Mike City	3:49
14.	""More Than A" (Interlude)"		Dwele; Mike City	0:45
15.	"What's Not to Love"	Flowers	Mike City	3:25
16.	"Give Me a Chance"	Gardner; Lamb	Nottz	3:37
17.	"I Wanna" (featuring DJ Quik)	Gardner; David Blake; Archie	G-One	4:16
Total length:				55:30

iTunes Bonus Track
No.	Title	Length
18.	"Motivate"	3:27

Japanese and Best Buy editions
No.	Title	Producer(s)	Length
1.	"Wants (Intro)"	Dwele	1:20
2.	"I Wish"	Nottz	3:07
3.	"She A Star"		3:24
4.	"Grown"	G-One	3:48
5.	"Dodgin' Your Phone" (featuring David Banner)	Dwele	5:39
6.	"Dim The Lights" (featuring Raheem DeVaughn)	Dwele	4:32
7.	"World" (Intro)	Dwele	1:07
8.	"How I Deal" (featuring Slum Village)	Dwele	3:42
9.	"Hangover"	Dwele	4:27
10.	"My People"	Dwele	4:27
11.	"Detroit Sunrise" (featuring Monica Blaire & Lloyd Dwayne)	Dwele	3:36
12.	"Women (Intro)" (featuring Kindra Parker)	Dwele	0:40
13.	"I Understand"	Dwele	4:34
14.	"Love You Right"	Mike City	3:49
15.	"Kissing Game"		3:22
16.	""More Than A" (Interlude)"	Dwele; Mike City	0:45
17.	"What's Not To Love"	Mike City	3:25
18.	"Give Me A Chance"	Nottz	3:38
19.	"You Don't Love Me"		3:19
20.	"I Wanna" (featuring DJ Quik)	G-One	4:16

== Charts ==
Chart performance for W.ants W.orld W.omen
Chart (2010)	Peak position
US Billboard 200	28
US Top R&B/Hip-Hop Albums (Billboard)	9
US Independent Albums (Billboard)	3
