= Illa J =

American rapper (born 1986)

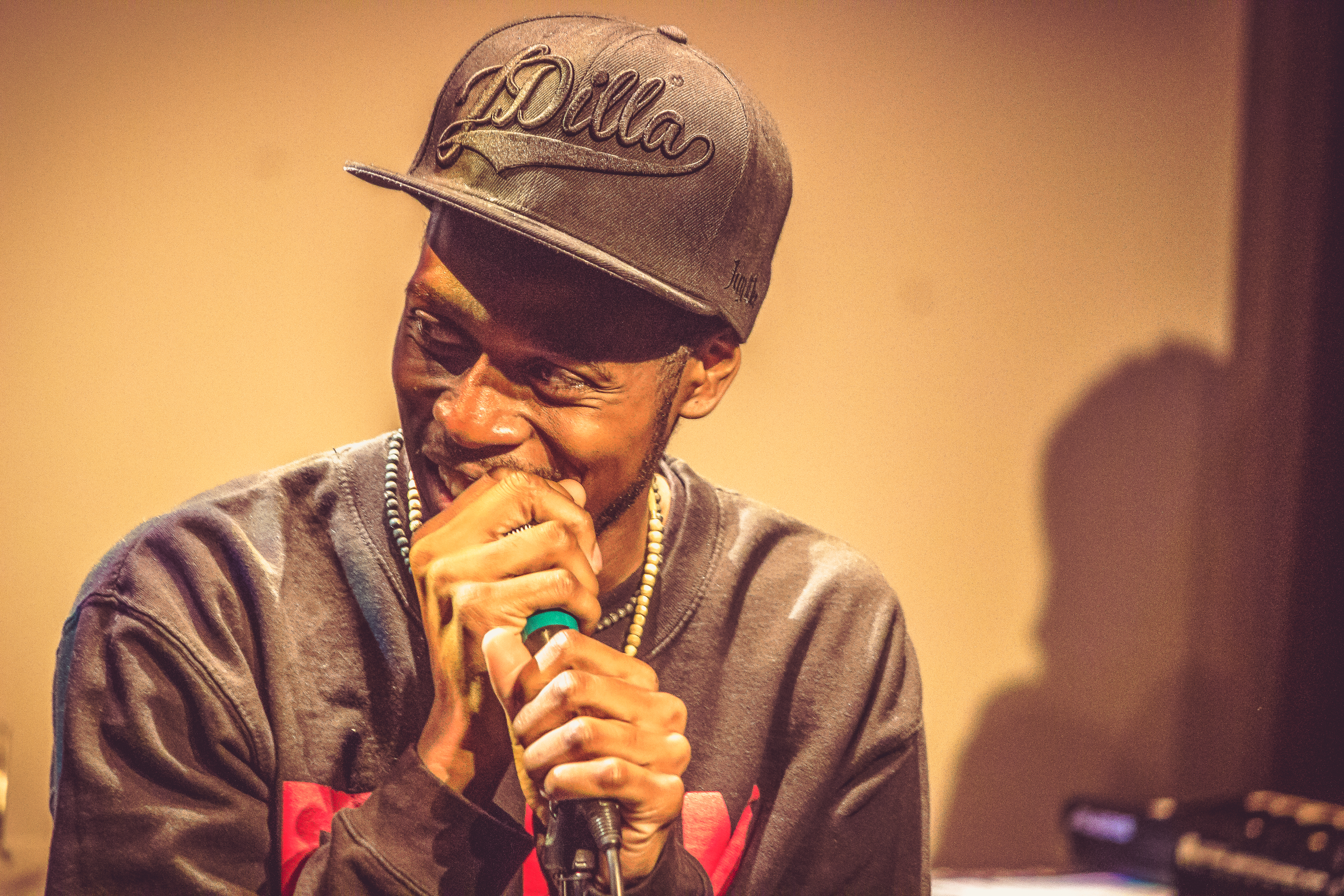
- Illa J Performing at Hip Hop You Don't Stop in Montreal in September 2015

Background information
- Born: John Derek Yancey; October 13, 1986 (age 39); Detroit, Michigan, U.S.
- Genre: Hip-hop
- Occupations: Rapper; singer; record producer; songwriter
- Instruments: Turntables; MPC3000; sampler; drum machine; keyboards; synthesizer; drums; vocals; bass
- Years active: 2004–present
- Labels: Bastard Jazz Recordings; Delicious Vinyl; Yancey Media Group
- Formerly of: Slum Village; Yancey Boys

John Derek Yancey (born October 13, 1986), better known by his stage name Illa J, is an American rapper, singer, record producer and songwriter from Detroit, Michigan who has released two albums on Delicious Vinyl Records. He is the younger brother of the late hip hop producer, and rapper J Dilla, and a former member of hip hop group Slum Village. He also released a collaborative album as Yancey Boys along with Frank Nitt. Illa J's second solo album ILLA J came out via the Brooklyn-based record label, Bastard Jazz.

== Early life ==
Illa J grew up in a musical family. He is the younger brother of J Dilla, and is the son of Maureen Yancey, a former opera singer, and Beverly Dewitt Yancey, a jazz bassist. John Yancey was the youngest of four children including a sister (Martha) and two brothers (Earl and James). The family lived in a house near McDougall and Nevada, on the east side of Detroit. According to Slum Village founding member T3, before getting into music Illa J's main focus was basketball. In 2006, after the death of his brother, he decided to drop out of Central Michigan University, and continue the family's involvement with music.

== Career ==
In 2008, he released his debut album, Yancey Boys on Delicious Vinyl Records. It is produced entirely by previously unused beats that were made by J Dilla and were left sitting at the offices of Delicious Vinyl over several years. Stones Throw Records released a digital instrumental version of the album in 2009. In the following year (2010), he quietly released a second EP entitled, 4 Past Midnite. In the year 2013, he followed with the album Evolution as Slum Village along with rapper T3 and producer Young RJ, and a collaborative album with Frank Nitt, entitled Sunset Blvd. In 2015, he released ILLA J on Bastard Jazz Records, which was produced by Potatohead People. Also in 2015, he joined the collective Torchlight Commission with A-Ro, Ishkan, Jeff Spec, Jon Rogers, Jules Chaz, LMNO, Moka Only, Mosaic, Mr. Brady, and Potatohead People.

== Discography ==
=== Studio albums ===
- 2008: Yancey Boys
- 2015: ILLA J (produced by Potatohead People)
- 2017: Home
- 2018: John Yancey

=== Collaborative albums ===
- 2013: Evolution (with T3 & Young RJ as Slum Village)
- 2013: Sunset Blvd. (with Frank Nitt as Yancey Boys)
- 2015: YES (with T3 & Young RJ as Slum Village)

=== EPs ===
- 2007: Illa J EP
- 2010: 4 Past Midnite
- 2026: Phone Home

=== Mixtapes ===
- 2012: Dirty Slums (with T3 & Young RJ as Slum Village)
- 2013: Dirty Slums 2 (with T3 & Young RJ as Slum Village)

=== Singles ===
- 2008: "We Here"
- 2009: "Sound Like Love" (featuring Debi Nova)
- 2010: "Affair"
- 2012: "The Throwaway" (featuring Frank Nitt)
- 2013: "Quicksand" (Yancey Boys featuring Common and Dezi Paige)
- 2015: "Strippers"
- 2015: "Universe"
- 2015: "All Good Pt. 2" (featuring Moka Only & Ivan Ave)
- 2018: Enjoy the Ride

=== Guest appearances ===
- Bishop Lamont & Black Milk – "Spectacular" from Caltroit (2007)
- J Dilla – "See That Boy Fly" from Jay Stay Paid (2009)
- Focus... – "Homage to Dilla" from Pay Homage series (2009)
- Grynch – "You Know Me (Remix)" from Chemistry 1.5 (2009)
- Roc C – "Turn It Up" (2010)
- Slum Village – "The Reunion, Pt. 2" from Villa Manifesto (2010)
- Cris Prolific – "Voyage" from Art/Money Vol. 1 (2011)
- Jonti – "The Days Have Turned" (2011)
- J Dilla – "Do It for Dilla Dawg" from Rebirth of Detroit (2012)
- Slum Village – "Greatness", "Nightmares (No Mas)", "Look at Yo Face", "How It Feel", "What You Want", "Un Fuc Witable" from Dirty Slums 2 (2013)
- Jonti – "Home" (2013)
- Moka Only – “Commission Boogie” from Martian XMAS 2014 (2014)
- Potatohead People – "Explosives" and "Seeds" from Big Luxury (2015)
- Debi Nova – Este Amores (2017)
- Potatohead People – "What It Feels Like" from Mellow Fantasy (2020)
- Phife Dawg – "French Kiss Trois" from Forever (2022)
