= Seven Times Down Eight Times Up =

Studio album by eLZhi
- Released: September 25, 2020
- Genre: Hip hop
- Label: Glow365
- Producer: JR Swiftz

ELZhi chronology
Lead Poison (2016)	Seven Times Down Eight Times Up (2020)

Seven Times Down Eight Times Up is the third studio album by rapper eLZhi. It was released in 2020, four years after his sophomore effort, Lead Poison. The entire album was produced by JR Swiftz, and featured fellow Detroit-based artists Monica Blaire and Fes Roc as the only guests.

== Rankings and ratings ==
Professional ratings
Review scores
Source	Rating
Rap Reviews	9/10

Seven Times Down Eight Times Up appeared in lists compiled by several reputed publications such as Hip Hop Golden Age and The Boston Globe.

Rankings
Source	Category	Rank
Hip Hop Golden Age	The Best Hip Hop Albums Of 2020	8
Glide	Quarantine Hits: Notable Hip Hop Albums of 2020	-
PopMatters	The 15 Best Hip-Hop Albums of 2020	11
The Boston Globe	Top 10 hip-hop albums of 2020	-

== Track listing ==
- All tracks produced by JR Swiftz.

No.	Title	Length
1.	"Foolish Intro"	1:42
2.	"Smoke & Mirrors" (featuring Monica Blaire)	3:56
3.	"EarlyBird Nightowl"	4:29
4.	"Hot Winter Cold Summer"	4:30
5.	"Light One Write One"	4:47
6.	"Ferndale"	3:42
7.	"Grindhouse Double Feature Presents Guns & Boats" (performed by Fes Roc)	2:11
8.	"Grindhouse Double Feature Presents THUGGed Out Zombies"	2:59
9.	"Potential"	4:51
10.	"G.O.D." (featuring Monica Blaire)	4:10
11.	"Master Class"	4:11
12.	"JASON"	4:47
Total length:		46:40
