= Evolution (Slum Village album) =

Studio album by Slum Village
- Released: June 25, 2013
- Recorded: 2011–2013
- Studio: RJ Rice Studios (Southfield, MI)
- Genre: Hip hop
- Label: Ne'Astra Music Group; Traffic Entertainment Group
- Producer: Earlly Mac; Focus...; T3; Young RJ

Slum Village chronology
Villa Manifesto (2010)	Evolution (2013)	Yes! (2015)

Evolution is the seventh studio album by American hip hop trio Slum Village. It was released on June 25, 2013, via Ne'Astra Music and Traffic Entertainment Group. Recording sessions took place at RJ Rice Studios in Southfield, Michigan. Production was handled by Young RJ, Focus..., Earlly Macmillion and T3. It features guest appearances from Big Pooh, Focus..., Vice Verse, Blu, Earlly Macmillion, Havoc, J. Ivy, Joe Scudda, Joteka and DJ Jazzy Jeff.

== Critical reception ==
Professional ratings
Aggregate scores
Source	Rating
Metacritic	60/100
Review scores
Source	Rating
Exclaim!	7/10
Pitchfork	5.5/10
RapReviews	7/10

Evolution was met with average reviews from music critics. At Metacritic, which assigns a normalized rating out of 100 to reviews from mainstream publications, the album received an average score of 60, based on four reviews.

Kevin Jones of Exclaim! stated: "while not every track bangs, the three managed to create a fairly strong record". Steve Juon of RapReviews wrote: "Evolution may not be a cutting edge advancement of hip-hop, but it's no embarrassment to Baatin and Dilla's legacy either. It's a solid album you wouldn't be ashamed to pledge a few dollars toward for a copy".

In his mixed review for Pitchfork, Mike Madden claimed: "Slum Village has little to say lyrically".

== Track listing ==
No.	Title	Producer(s)	Length
1.	"Braveheart" (featuring Havoc)	Young RJ	4:22
2.	"Rock Rock" (featuring Rapper Big Pooh and DJ Jazzy Jeff)	Young RJ	3:18
3.	"Let It Go" (featuring Blu)	Young RJ	3:35
4.	"Forever"	Young RJ; T3	2:56
5.	"Scared Money" (featuring Earlly Mac)	Young RJ; Earlly Mac	3:34
6.	"Summer Breeze"	Focus...	4:09
7.	"The Line" (featuring Focus...)	Young RJ	4:00
8.	"Hustle" (featuring Vice and J. Ivy)	Young RJ	4:03
9.	"Bout Dat" (featuring Focus...)	Young RJ	3:15
10.	"1 Nite" (featuring Vice)	Focus...	3:54
11.	"Greatness" (featuring Joteka)	Young RJ	3:44
12.	"Riot" (featuring Rapper Big Pooh and Joe Scudda)	Young RJ	3:03

== Personnel ==
- R.L. "T3" Altman III – vocals, producer (track 4)
- John "Illa J" Yancey – vocals
- Ralph J. "Young RJ" Rice Jr. – producer & mixing (tracks: 1–5, 7–9, 11, 12)
- Kejuan "Havoc" Muchita – featured artist (track 1)
- Kameron Corvet – backing vocals (tracks: 1, 6, 10, 12)
- Larry Tucker – drum fills (track 1)
- Thomas Louis "Big Pooh" Jones III – featured artist (tracks: 2, 12)
- Jeffrey A. "DJ Jazzy Jeff" Townes – featured artist (track 2)
- Bernard "Focus..." Edwards Jr. – keyboards (tracks: 2, 3, 11), backing vocals (track 3), featured artist (tracks: 7, 9), producer & mixing (tracks: 6, 10)
- Johnson "Blu" Barnes III – featured artist (track 3)
- Earl Patrick "Earlly Macmillion" Taylor – featured artist & producer (track 5)
- Lewis Andrew "Drey Skonie" Jackson Jr. – backing vocals (track 5)
- Kevin "Vice Verse" Perkins – featured artist (tracks: 8, 10)
- James "J. Ivy" Richardson II – featured artist (track 8)
- Ken – guitar (track 9)
- Jyotika "Joteka" Simmons – featured artist (track 11)
- Joseph "Joe Scudda" Griffen – featured artist (track 12)
