= Carte Blanche (Phat Kat album) =

Studio album by Phat Kat
- Released: April 3, 2007
- Recorded: 2005–06
- Genre: Hip hop
- Length: 45:44
- Label: Look Records
- Producer: Phat Kat (exec.); Black Milk; J Dilla; Nick Speed; Young RJ

Phat Kat chronology
| The Undeniable LP (2004) | Carte Blanche (2007) | The S.O.S. Project (2017) |

Carte Blanche is the second studio album by American Detroit-based rapper Phat Kat. It was released on April 3, 2007, via Look Records. Production was handled by J Dilla, Black Milk, Young RJ and Nick Speed. It features guest appearances from Black Milk, Elzhi, Fat Ray, Guilty Simpson, House Shoes, Lo Louis, Melanie Rutherford, T3 and Truth Hurts.

== Critical reception ==
Professional ratings
Review scores
| Source | Rating |
|---|---|
| AllMusic | 3.5/5 stars |
| HipHopDX | 3.5/5 |
| Plug One | 3.5/5 stars |
| RapReviews | 7.5/10 |
| Stylus Magazine | B |

Rowald Pruyn of RapReviews praised Phat Kat for improving his "aggressive, simple bar structure" and the production from J Dilla and the other local producers for crafting "a consistent Motown-meets-MPC sound," concluding that "Carte Blanche is Phat Kat's record industry redemption album. It is also proof of a new generation of upcoming Detroit producers honouring the legacy of the old master." Bret Love of HipHopDX wrote, "while not every track here is a winner, there is more than enough evidence to prove that Phat Kat is an emcee worth watching." AllMusic's Marisa Brown wrote, "His delivery is consistent, his rhymes are clever, and Carte Blanche is yet another excellent addition to the growing collection of Detroit hip-hop." Mosi Reeves of Plug One critiqued that Phat Kat's "single-minded focus" of "incessant braggadocio" would rely on quality beats, saying the first half of the record is more stronger than the second half.

== Track listing ==
| No. | Title | Producer(s) | Length |
|---|---|---|---|
| 1. | "Nasty Ain't It?" | J Dilla | 2:39 |
| 2. | "Get It Started" | Young RJ | 2:05 |
| 3. | "My Old Label" | J Dilla | 2:29 |
| 4. | "Cold Steel" (featuring Elzhi) | J Dilla | 3:46 |
| 5. | "Danger" (featuring Black Milk and T3) | Black Milk | 3:35 |
| 6. | "Vessels" (featuring Truth Hurts) | Nick Speed | 4:36 |
| 7. | "Lovely" (featuring Melanie Rutherford) | Young RJ | 3:14 |
| 8. | "Cash Em Out" (featuring Loe Louis) | Black Milk | 2:20 |
| 9. | "Game Time" | J Dilla | 3:38 |
| 10. | "Survival Kit" | Black Milk | 2:31 |
| 11. | "Nightmare" (featuring Guilty Simpson) | Nick Speed | 3:08 |
| 12. | "Hard Enuff" (featuring Fat Ray) | Black Milk | 3:13 |
| 13. | "True Story Pt. 2" (featuring House Shoes) | Young RJ | 4:04 |
| 14. | "Don't Nobody Care About Us" | J Dilla | 4:27 |
| Total length: | | | 45:44 |

Bonus tracks
| No. | Title | Producer(s) | Length |
|---|---|---|---|
| 15. | "World Premier" | J Dilla | 2:47 |
| 16. | "It Don't Get No Liver Than This" (featuring La Peace) | J Dilla | 4:07 |
| Total length: | | | 52:38 |

== Personnel ==
- Ron "Phat Kat" Watts – main artist, mixing (track 14), executive producer
- Jason "Elzhi" Powers – featured artist (track 4)
- R.L. "T3" Altman III – featured artist (track 5)
- Curtis "Black Milk" Cross – featured artist (track 5), producer (tracks: 5, 8, 10, 12)
- Shari "Truth Hurts" Watson – featured artist (track 6)
- Melanie Rutherford – featured artist (track 7)
- Lionel "Lo Louis" Houie – featured artist (tracks: 8, 13)
- Byron Simpson – featured artist (track 11)
- "Fat Ray" Boggues II – featured artist (track 12)
- Michael "House Shoes" Buchanan – featured artist (track 13)
- DJ Dez – scratches
- James "J Dilla" Yancey – producer (tracks: 1, 3, 4, 9, 14)
- Ralph "Young RJ" Rice – producer (tracks: 2, 7, 13)
- Nicholas Speed – producer (tracks: 6, 11)
- Dave Cooley – mixing (tracks: 1–13), mastering
- Jeff Jank – design
- Charles "Ques" Munka – design
- Peter Jones – photography
