= Rize (album) =

Demo album by Dwele
- Released: September 2, 2000
- Genres: R&B; soul
- Length: 45:34
- Label: Self-released
- Producer: Dwele

Dwele chronology
| Rize (2000) | Subject (2003) |

Rize is R&B singer Dwele's 2000 self-released demo.

== Track listing ==
All tracks are written by Dwele.

Rize track listing
| No. | Title | Length |
|---|---|---|
| 1. | "Intro" | 2:31 |
| 2. | "Jimmy Down" | 5:28 |
| 3. | "Imagine" | 3:23 |
| 4. | "Flywun" | 2:15 |
| 5. | "Whoomp" | 2:52 |
| 6. | "Angel" (Original) | 2:29 |
| 7. | "Dime For Your Thoughts" | 2:42 |
| 8. | "Lady @ Mahogany" | 3:07 |
| 9. | "Timeless" | 1:48 |
| 10. | "Twuneanunda" | 3:46 |
| 11. | "Early Morning" | 4:51 |
| 12. | "Groove" (Live Jazzy Ish) | 2:16 |
| 13. | "Blaze Up a Square" | 1:53 |
| 14. | "Ready For Love" (Interlude) | 1:27 |
| 15. | "Remedy" | 2:08 |
| 16. | "Slide Out" | 2:38 |
| Total length: | | 51:03 |
