= Selfish (Slum Village song) =

2004 single by Slum Village featuring Kanye West and John Legend

Single by Slum Village featuring Kanye West and John Legend

from the album Detroit Deli (A Taste of Detroit)
- Released: March 16, 2004
- Genre: Hip-hop
- Length: 3:45
- Label: Capitol
- Songwriters: R.L. Altman III; Jason Powers; Kanye West; Aretha Franklin
- Producer: Kanye West

Slum Village singles chronology
"Disco" (2002)	"Selfish" (2004)	"Do You" (2004)

Kanye West singles chronology
"All Falls Down" (2004)	"Selfish" (2004)	"Talk About Our Love" (2004)

John Legend singles chronology
"Selfish" (2004)	"Used to Love U" (2004)

Music video
- "Selfish" on YouTube

"Selfish" is a song by American hip-hop group Slum Village, released on March 16, 2004, as the lead single from their fourth studio album, Detroit Deli (A Taste of Detroit) (2004). It features American rapper Kanye West, who also produced the song, and American singer John Legend. The song contains a sample of "Call Me" by Aretha Franklin.

== Background ==
In an interview with The Source in February 2024, Slum Village revealed that Kanye West charged $90,000 ($152,024.25 in 2025 dollars) for his feature and beat in the song because he was turned down by a certain A&R when looking for a record deal. The group met with West and then-unknown singer John Legend in the studio, where West played them the beat. Young RJ encouraged West to rap on it, and West immediately recorded a verse. T3 recorded half of his verse before deciding to write his verse at home and recorded his entire verse at the studio the next day. Elzhi could not come up with anything at the time, so they had to wait one more day before mixing the song.

Slum Village recalled there were many women at the shoot for the music video. J Dilla arrived later than the other artists for the filming, as he was leaving a hospital. At the shoot, he was taunted by someone for seemingly being upstaged by Kanye West.

== Composition ==
The song features piano in the production and an R&B-esque chorus sung by John Legend. The lyrics focus on the rappers' attitudes and fondness toward various types of women, especially regarding sexual matters.

== Critical reception ==
Steve 'Flash' Juon of RapReviews wrote of Kanye West, "Though he's the hot MC and music man of the minute, it's to his credit that he doesn't steal SV's spotlight. T3 seems to have grown into his mic duties nicely, and deserves his shine". Juon further stated, "John Legend gets his propers too, for singing a smooth hook that goes extra nice with Kanye's relaxed and refreshing piano backdrop." Jamin Warren of Pitchfork considered the song among the "few brilliant moments" from Detroit Deli (A Taste of Detroit) and commented that Legend helps "create a simply ephemeral R&B; cut (although I wonder if Kanye's knack for homonyms on his verses is wearing thin)." Reviewing the album for Rolling Stone, Christian Hoard wrote the tracks "Selfish" and "Keep Holding On" find T3 and Elzhi "matching quick-tongued, booty-obsessed verses with smart, sturdy beats, but Slum Village need to refine their strategy before poking their heads above ground again."

== Charts ==
Chart (2004)	Peak position
US Billboard Hot 100	55
US Hot R&B/Hip-Hop Songs (Billboard)	20
US Hot Rap Songs (Billboard)	15
