= Heavy Is the Head (EP) =

Heavy is the Head...

EP by Marv Won
- Released: October 16, 2012
- Genre: Hip hop
- Length: 28:59
- Label: My Own Planet
- Producer: Mr. Porter; Marvwon; Young ROC; Trox; Jay Oliver; Peace Of Mind; Silent Riot; Mags

Marvwon chronology
| Wayne Fontes Music (2010) | Heavy Is The Head... (2012) | Soundtrack Of Autumn (2016) |

Heavy Is The Head... is the first solo extended play by American rapper and producer MarvWon, released October 16, 2012, following up from his 2010 album Wayne Fontes Music. Signed under Mr. Porter's My Own Planet imprint, this nine-track record featured Detroit-based artists Royce Da 5'9" (of Slaughterhouse), Fat Killahz and Kon Artis (of D12), whose production is primarily presented, along with Jay Oliver, Young Roc, Pzuvmynd, and Trox.

In 2013, Marv dropped a single for "Talk Cash Shit" and a video directed by Mario "Khalif" Butterfield. In 2014, he shot another video for "What Up".

A free digital version of the Heavy Is The Head... project is available to download on the Internet.

== Track listing ==
| No. | Title | Producer(s) | Length |
|---|---|---|---|
| 1. | "The King's Speech" | MarvWon; Mags; Silent Riot | 0:43 |
| 2. | "What Up" | Jay Oliver | 3:54 |
| 3. | "Talk Ca$h Shit" | Young Roc | 3:12 |
| 4. | "Winner's Circle" (featuring Royce Da 5'9") | Kon Artis | 4:12 |
| 5. | "Power" (featuring F.E.R.G.) | Young Roc | 3:09 |
| 6. | "Got To Go" (featuring Kon Artis) | Kon Artis | 3:04 |
| 7. | "Goose Down" (featuring Kon Artis) | Kon Artis | 3:03 |
| 8. | "Still The Same" (featuring Young Roc) | Trox; Kon Artis (co.) | 4:09 |
| 9. | "FK 4 Life" (featuring The Fat Killahz) | Pzyvmynd | 3:33 |
| Total length: | | | 28:59 |

- †The song "Winner's Circle" contains samples from Chanson D'Un Jour D'Hiver by Cortex (1975)

== Additional personnel ==
Mario Butterfield - cover art & design
