= Sketches of a Man =

...Sketches of a Man

Studio album by Dwele
- Released: June 24, 2008
- Studio: The Loft (Detroit, Michigan); Durt Factory (Norfolk, Virginia); 916 (Universal City, California); The Chop Shop (Brooklyn, New York)
- Genre: R&B
- Length: 1:00:42
- Label: Koch
- Producer: Dwele; G-One; Mr. Lee; Nottz

Dwele chronology
Some Kinda... (2005)	...Sketches of a Man (2008)	The Dresden Soul Symphony (2008)

Professional ratings
Review scores
Source	Rating
AllMusic	3/5 stars
HipHopDX	3/5
Robert Christgau	(dud)

...Sketches of a Man is the third studio album by American musician Dwele. It was released on June 24, 2008 via Koch Records. Recording sessions took place at the Loft in Detroit, at Durt Factory in Norfolk, at 916 Studios in Universal City, and at the Chop Shop in Brooklyn. Production was mainly handled by Dwele himself, in addition to G-1, Mr. Lee, Nottz and Joe Archie. It features guest appearances from J. Tait, Lloyd Dwayne and Slum Village.

The music video for the song "I'm Cheatin'" features an appearance from Detroit-bred model and Playboy cybergirl Erika Mayshawn.

== Track listing ==
No.	Title	Writer(s)	Producer(s)	Length
1.	"Sketches Of A Man (Intro)"	Andwele Gardner	Dwele	1:40
2.	"Free As A Bird"	Gardner	Dwele	3:26
3.	"Feels So Good"	Gardner	Dwele	3:20
4.	"Blow Your Mind"	Gardner	Dwele	1:23
5.	"A Few Reasons (Truth Pt. 2)"	Gardner; Dominick Lamb	Nottz	3:48
6.	"Open Your Eyes"	Norman Harris; Bruce Malament; Robert Hunter Caldwell	Dwele	3:21
7.	"Workin' On It"	Gardner	Dwele	1:17
8.	"Brandi" (featuring Slum Village)	Gardner; Jason Powers; R.L. Altman III	Dwele	3:24
9.	"5 Dolla Mic"	Gardner	Dwele; G-One	1:57
10.	"I'm Cheatin'"	Gardner; George Archie; Joe Archie	G-One; Joe Archie (assoc.)	3:42
11.	"You Won't Be Lonely"	Gardner	Dwele	0:59
12.	"Love Ultra"	Gardner	Dwele	3:51
13.	"Travelin' Girl"	Gardner	Dwele	4:29
14.	"If You Want To" (featuring Lloyd Dwayne & J. Tait)	Gardner	Dwele	4:00
15.	"Shady"	Gardner	Dwele	4:29
16.	"70's"	Gardner	Dwele	1:48
17.	"Vain"	Gardner	Dwele	4:52
18.	"Spiritual"	Gardner	Dwele	2:00
19.	"I'm Sorry (Wake The Musical Baby)"	Gardner	Dwele	3:47
20.	"Body Rock"	Gardner; Leroy Williams; Stokley Williams; Ricky Kinchen; Homer O'Dell; Lawrence Waddell; Jeffrey Allen; Keri Lewis	Mr. Lee	3:09
Total length:				1:00:42

== Personnel ==
- Andwele "Dwele" Gardner – vocals, producer, arranger
- Jason "Elzhi" Powers – vocals
- R.L. "T3" Altman III – vocals
- Lloyd Dwayne – vocals
- James Tait – vocals
- Carmelita Wingate – additional vocals
- Kendra Parker – additional vocals
- Raynee Crowe – additional vocals
- Darren Brown – additional vocals
- Mario "Khalif" Butterfield – additional vocals, photography
- DeSabata Robinson – lead guitar
- Dominick "Nottz" Lamb – producer, recording
- George "G-One" Archie – producer, programming, recording
- Joe Archie – associate producer, additional programming
- Leroy "Mr. Lee" Williams – producer
- Darryl Sloan – recording
- Todd Fairall – mixing
- Kirk Yano – mixing
- Arnold Mischkulnig – mixing, mastering
- David "DJ Quik" Blake – mixing
- Shane "West Coast" McClain – engineering
- Quran Hill – engineering, assistant mixing
- Chris Athens – mastering
- Ronald "Ron E." Estill – executive producer
- Timothy Maynor – executive producer
- Tilmon Welch – associate executive producer

== Charts ==
Chart performance for ...Sketches of a Man
Chart (2008)	Peak position
US Billboard 200	35
US Top R&B/Hip-Hop Albums (Billboard)	7
US Independent Albums (Billboard)	4
