= Villa Manifesto EP =

EP by Slum Village
- Released: December 15, 2009
- Recorded: 2009
- Genre: Hip hop
- Length: 19:45
- Label: Barak Records
- Producer: Young RJ; Madlib; Focus

Slum Village chronology
Slum Village (2005)	Villa Manifesto EP (2009)	Villa Manifesto (2010)

Singles from Villa Manifesto EP
- 1. "Cloud 9" Released: May 12, 2009; 2. "Dope Man" Released: November 12, 2009

Professional ratings
Review scores
Source	Rating
HipHopDX	(favorable)

Villa Manifesto EP is an EP by Detroit hip hop group Slum Village, released on December 15, 2009 under Barak Records. The EP leads up to their full-length studio album, Villa Manifesto (2010). The EP was preceded by two singles – "Cloud 9" featuring Marsha Ambrosius, and "Dope Man."

== Background ==
Four years after the release of their self-titled fifth album, the Detroit trio (T3, Baatin, Elzhi) decided to work on another album. After the group's disputes were resolved in 2008, late founding member Baatin reunited with the other group members and worked on the group's long-awaited sixth LP Villa Manifesto before his death in 2009. The EP A&R by DJ Scrap Dirty (Violator Allstar DJs) serves as a prelude to the album which was released on July 27, 2010.

== Track listing ==
No.	Title	Producer(s)	Length
1.	"Starter"	Young RJ	1:26
2.	"Nitro" (featuring Young RJ)	Young RJ	3:11
3.	"Da Night"	Young RJ	3:55
4.	"Money Right"	Madlib	4:06
5.	"Dope Man"	Young RJ	2:49
6.	"Cloud 9" (featuring Marsha Ambrosius)	Focus	4:19
Total length:			19:45
