= The Undeniable LP =

Studio album by Phat Kat
- Released: June 22, 2004
- Recorded: 2002 – 2003
- Genre: Hip hop
- Label: Barak Records
- Producer: B.R. Gunna, J Dilla, Jake One, Fat Ray

Phat Kat chronology
The Undeniable LP (2004)	Carte Blanche (2007)

The Undeniable LP is the debut album by Detroit rapper and close Slum Village affiliate Phat Kat.

It was released twice, both on Barak Records. The Detroit Edition omits the three tracks produced by Fat Ray as well as "Rainy Dayz," produced by Jake One.

== Track listing ==
1. "Intro"
2. "Door" featuring J Dilla & Black Milk
3. "Dedication 2004"
4. "It'z a Rap" featuring Big Tone
5. "Shake, Shake" featuring MC Breed
6. "VIP In"
7. "Polo Shit"
8. "True Story"
9. "Destiny" featuring Melanie Rutherford
10. "Rainy Dayz" featuring Dwele
11. "Big Booties"
12. "Red Alert" featuring Fat Ray
13. "Wolfz" featuring Slum Village & Black Milk
14. "Club Banger"
15. "1000 Niggaz" featuring La Peace, Obie Trice, Loe Louis & Killa Ghanz

The Detroit Edition bonus tracks

1. "All Y'all"
2. "Get Right"
3. "Who, What, Where" featuring DJ Dez
