= Yancey Boys =

Studio album by Illa J
- Released: November 4, 2008
- Recorded: 1995–1998 (Beats, instruments); 2008 (Vocals, scratches, additional bass, mix) at Yancey Boys Studio (Los Angeles, California)
- Genres: Hip hop; R&B; soul
- Length: 47:58
- Label: Delicious Vinyl
- Producers: Michael "Mike Floss" Ross (exec.); Stacey Kim (co-exec.); Jay Dee

Illa J chronology
Yancey Boys (2008)	4 Past Midnite (2010)

Singles from Yancey Boys
- 1. "We Here" Released: August 26, 2008; 2. "Sounds Like Love" Released: May 26, 2009

Yancey Boys is the debut studio album by Detroit-based rapper/singer Illa J, featuring instrumental production from his late brother Jay Dee, also known as J Dilla. The album was released on November 4, 2008, under Delicious Vinyl. The beats were created from 1995 to 1998 during Jay Dee's tenure with Delicious Vinyl. The album's release was supported by two singles – "We Here" and "Sounds Like Love" featuring Debi Nova. Recording sessions for the album took place at Yancey Boys Studio in Los Angeles in 2008. Stones Throw Records released a digital instrumental version of the album in 2009.

== Background ==
The album's title is a tribute to the family name, and also because the album overall was produced by instrumentals composed by the older brother, while the vocals where provided by the younger brother. In the wake of Dilla's death, the unused tracks were given to Illa J by Delicious Vinyl's founder, Michael "Mike Floss" Ross. "From '95 through '98 Jay Dee was my go-to guy for hot beats and remixes. He was always making beats, always. So there was a select amount of tracks that he composed for me during that time, only they never got used. When I finally met Illa J [in 2007], I gave him a CD containing those unreleased beats," said Michael Ross.

== Critical reception ==
Professional ratings
Review scores
Source	Rating
AllMusic	3/5 stars
The Austin Chronicle	2.5/5 stars
HipHopDX	3/5 stars
Kevin Nottingham	(75/100)
Pitchfork	(6.3/10)
PopMatters	7/10 stars
Sonink Music	3.583/5 stars
XLR8R	(7/10)

Upon its release, Yancey Boys was met with generally favorable reviews from music critics. AllMusic's David Jeffries gave the album three out of five stars, saying: "To his credit, his heavy workload includes putting the finishing touches on these lost tracks and figuring out how to pay tribute to his older brother while pimping his own potential. His solution is so understated and mellow that Yancey Boys ends up an interesting release for the Dilla faithful instead of Illa J's grand entrance." Adam Thomas of HipHopDX also gave the album a three out of five, saying: "Yancey Boys is no classic. However, it's an enjoyable ride that is filled with some great J Dilla production. Illa isn't the most talented, but he does show glimpses of potential in and around the album, which was truly been billed more around his brother than him from the start. The only problem is that in the future, he won't have his older brother to have his back in times of musical trouble. Even so, it's an earnest and sincere attempt from Illa to pay respect to his brother through one of the things that connected them, and in these times, that should mean enough."

Pitchfork Media reviewer Tom Breihan gave the album 6.3 out of ten, saying: "Thanks to his brother's beyond-the-grave contributions, he himself is the most disposable part of his own debut album. Luckily for him, it probably won't be too hard to find another hour's worth of unused Dilla tracks when it comes time to record the follow-up." Dave Heaton of PopMatters gave the album a seven out of ten, saying: "Dilla's music has that elemental quality, like it's air or water, a manifestation of nature. That's true whether it's an instrumental project like Donuts or a supporting track for a rapper. Illa J seems to understand that about Dilla's music. He keeps Yancey Boys in that same natural/mystical space, carrying on his brother's spirit while making a strong, if not explosive, mark as his own artist." XLR8R's Eric K. Arnold gave the album a seven out of ten, saying: "Yancey Boys isn't overly inundated with features, making it a true family affair as well as a delight for head-nodders." KevinNottingham.com gave the album a 75 out of 100, saying: "Whether it was on purpose or not, Illa J's presence takes the backseat on this album, and Dilla's legacy of work shines through. The periodic off-beat bars and the mediocre rhymes proves that Illa J is far from a polished lyricist, however, Illa understands how to complement Dilla's work in such a way that it highlights every beat, break and soulfulness within the production. Whether Yancey Boys purpose is to engage the listener to the sounds of neo-soul or to highlight J Dilla's endless talent, this release is an effortless listen, and ultimately an album worth giving a chance."

== Track listing ==
All tracks produced by Jay Dee (aka J Dilla) except "Mr. Shakes", which is a skit performed by Affion Crockett; all tracks co-produced by Illa J and Mike Floss.

No.	Title	Writer(s)	Length
1.	"Timeless"	John Yancey; James Yancey	3:11
2.	"We Here"	John Yancey; James Yancey	4:09
3.	"R U Listening?" (featuring Guilty Simpson)	John Yancey; James Yancey; Byron Simpson	4:19
4.	"Alien Family" (by Frank Nitt)	James Yancey; Frank Bush	2:17
5.	"Strugglin'"	John Yancey; James Yancey	3:23
6.	"Showtime"	John Yancey; James Yancey	3:45
7.	"Swagger"	John Yancey; James Yancey	3:33
8.	"Mr. Shakes (Skit)" (aka Affion Crockett)	Affion Crockett	0:44
9.	"DFTF" (featuring Affion Crockett)	John Yancey; James Yancey; Affion Crockett	4:23
10.	"All Good"	John Yancey; James Yancey	3:05
11.	"Sounds Like Love" (featuring Debi Nova)	John Yancey; James Yancey; Deborah Kader	3:25
12.	"Everytime"	John Yancey; James Yancey	4:32
13.	"Illasoul"	John Yancey; James Yancey	3:47
14.	"Air Signs"	John Yancey; James Yancey	3:25
Total length:			47:58

Sample credits

- "Timeless" contains a sample of "Healing Force" by Don Pullen.
- "We Here" contains samples of "Silhouette" by L.A. Express; "Trans Europe Express" and "Metal on Metal" by Kraftwerk.
- "R U Listening?" contains samples of "North Beach" by George Duke and "Much More" by De La Soul & Yummy Bingham.
- "Alien Family" contains a sample of "Windy C" by 100% Pure Poison.
- "Showtime" contains a sample of "Aquarius" by Sérgio Mendes.
- "Mr. Shakes (Skit)" contains a sample of "Für Elise" by Ludwig van Beethoven.
- "DFTF" contains samples of "The Colorado Trail" by Dave Grusin; "You're Gettin' a Little Too Smart" by Detroit Emeralds; "Passin' Me By" by The Pharcyde.
- "All Good" contains a sample of "The Look of Love" by Ray "Funky Trumpet" Davis.
- "Sounds Like Love" contains a sample of "See You Later" by Flip Nunez.
- "Everytime" contains a sample of "Is This What Feeling Gets?" by Diana Ross.

== Personnel ==
Credits for Yancey Boys adapted from AllMusic and from the album liner notes.

Musical personnel

- John "Illa J" Yancey – primary artist, vocals (tracks 1–3, 5–7, 9–14)
- Frank "Frank Nitt" Bush – guest vocals (track 4)
- Affion Crockett – guest vocals (track 9)
- Jason "J. Rocc" Jackson – scratching (3, 9)
- Deborah "Debi Nova" Kader – guest vocals (track 11)
- Paul Powell – bass played by (track 11)
- Byron "Guilty Simpson" Simpson – guest vocals (track 3)
- James "Jay Dee" Yancey – beats, instruments (tracks 1–7, 9–14)

Additional personnel

- Pete Ambrose – photography
- B.I.G.Dan – artwork [additional layout]
- Alfred Hawkins – artwork [Illa J logo design]
- Stacey Kim – co-executive producer, management
- Dina Juntila – artwork [art direction and graphic design]
- Ari Raskin – mastering
- Michael "Mike Floss" Ross – executive producer, mixing
- Geoff Schroer – engineer, mixing
