= Fan-Tas-Tic (Vol. 1) =

1997 studio album by Slum Village

Studio album by Slum Village
- Released: July 11, 1997 (bootleg release); February 28, 2006 (official release)
- Recorded: 1996–1997
- Genre: Hip hop
- Length: 53:32
- Label: Counterflow; Donut Boy Recordings
- Producer: Jay Dee

Slum Village chronology
Fan-Tas-Tic (Vol. 1) (00000005)	Fantastic, Vol. 2 (2000)

Professional ratings
Review scores
Source	Rating
AllMusic	4/5 stars
Pitchfork	8.5/10

Fan-Tas-Tic (Vol. 1) (sometimes spelled as Fantastic, Vol. 1), is the unofficial debut studio album by American hip hop group Slum Village. It comprises songs from their demo album, which was recorded in 1996 and 1997, but not officially released until 8 years later. It was nonetheless leaked onto the underground circuit and caused "quite a stir" in 1997. The whole album was produced by J Dilla. Many of the songs would later be revamped or re-conceived for their follow up album, Fantastic, Vol. 2 in 2000.

== Overview ==
The album was recorded in 1996 and 1997 in J Dilla's home studio. Fan-Tas-Tic (Vol. 1) quickly became popular with fans of Detroit hip hop, when copies of the cassette were sold by the group at concerts, and also made available at Record Time on Gratiot. The record became highly sought after, with copies costing up to $50 at one point.

Although, at the time Slum Village were hailed as successors to A Tribe Called Quest, Fan-Tas-Tic shares little in common with Tribe's earthy, cerebral brand of Hip hop. The lyrical content of the album, which dealt with acquiring wealth and the attention of women, later became commonplace among mainstream hip-hop artists.

Slum Village is a contradiction, a paradox. We break rules, we do things other people wouldn't do. Places other people wouldn't go, we go there, talking about things. That's why it's really difficult to compare us to A Tribe Called Quest, because they were more tribal, peaceful type people. We're nothing like that. - Baatin

The group received much praise for their seemingly freestyled approach (which they later admitted to), and also for the production style of the then-upcoming producer Jay Dee, who subtly used low end frequencies, intricate basslines, and offbeat drums, behind the "tag-team" rhyming of his partners, T3 and Baatin.

== Track listing ==
1. "Fantastic" – 1:28
2. "Keep It On (This Beat)" – 3:09
3. "I Don't Know" – 1:01
4. "How We Bullshit" – 1:16
5. "Fat Cat Song" (feat. Phat Kat) – 2:53
6. "The Look of Love" – 4:17
7. "Estimate" – 1:24
8. "Hoc N Pucky" – 1:38 (This track is not the original version, vocals from the original track have been stripped from and for the final version.)
9. "Beej N Dem" – 2:15
10. "Pregnant (T3)" – 1:17
11. "Forth & Back (Rock Music)" – 3:36
12. "Fantastic 2" – 0:50
13. "Fantastic 3" – 1:35
14. "This Beat (Keep It On) (Remix)" – 2:59
15. "5 Ela (Remix)" (feat. 5 Elementz) – 3:00
16. "Give This Nigga" – 1:35
17. "Players" – 2:59
18. "Look of Love (Remix)" – 2:46
19. "Pregnant (Baatin)" – 1:01
20. "Things U Do (Remix) / Uh-Ah-Wu-Ah" – 3:27
21. "Fat Cat (Remix)" – 2:44
22. "Fantastic 4" – 1:20
23. "What's Love Gotta Do with It (Look of Love Remix)" – 3:26 (2005 bonus track)
24. "2U4U" (instrumental) – 2:11 (2005 bonus track)

== Samples Used ==
- "Fantastic" contains a sample of "You'll Know When You Get There" by Herbie Hancock.
- "Keep It On" contains samples of "Snowflake Bop" by Gil Evans and "Risin' to the Top" by Keni Burke."Ain't No Half Steppin'" by Heatwave
- "I Don't Know" contains samples of "Sex Machine", "Make It Funky" and "My Thang" by James Brown.
- "Fat Cat Song" contains a sample of "Turn off the Lights" by Larry Young.
- "The Look of Love" contains samples of "The Look of Love" by Barney Kessel and "Inside My Love" by Trina Broussard.
- "Estimate" contains a sample of "You Call It Madness" by Clare Fischer.
- "Hoc N Pucky" contains a sample of "T.T.T. (Twelve Tone Tune)" by Bill Evans.
- "Beej N Dem" contains samples of "Atomic Dog" by George Clinton and "Friday The 13th" by Gil Evans.
- "Forth & Back (Rock Music)" contains samples of "Funkin 4 Jamaica" by Tom Browne, "I Thought It Was You" by Herbie Hancock & "Love Poem" by Tom Scott and The L.A. Express.
- "Fantastic 3" contains a sample of "Age of Aquarius” by the Moog Machine from the album Switched-On Rock.
- "5 Ela (Remix)" contains samples of "Yearning for Your Love" by The Gap Band and "Remind Me" by Patrice Rushen.
- "Give This Nigga" contains a sample of "Heartbreaker" by Zapp.
- "Players" contains a sample of "Clair" by Singers Unlimited.
- "Look of Love (Remix)" contains a sample of "Inside My Love" by Minnie Ripperton.
- "Pregnant (Baatin)" contains a sample of "A Chunk of Sugar" by Roger Troutman.
- "Things U Do (Remix)" contains a sample of "Sing Me Softly of the Blues" by Gary Burton Quartet.
- "2U4U (Instrumental)" contains a sample of "Jonz In My Bonz" by D'Angelo.
