= Dwele =

American singer

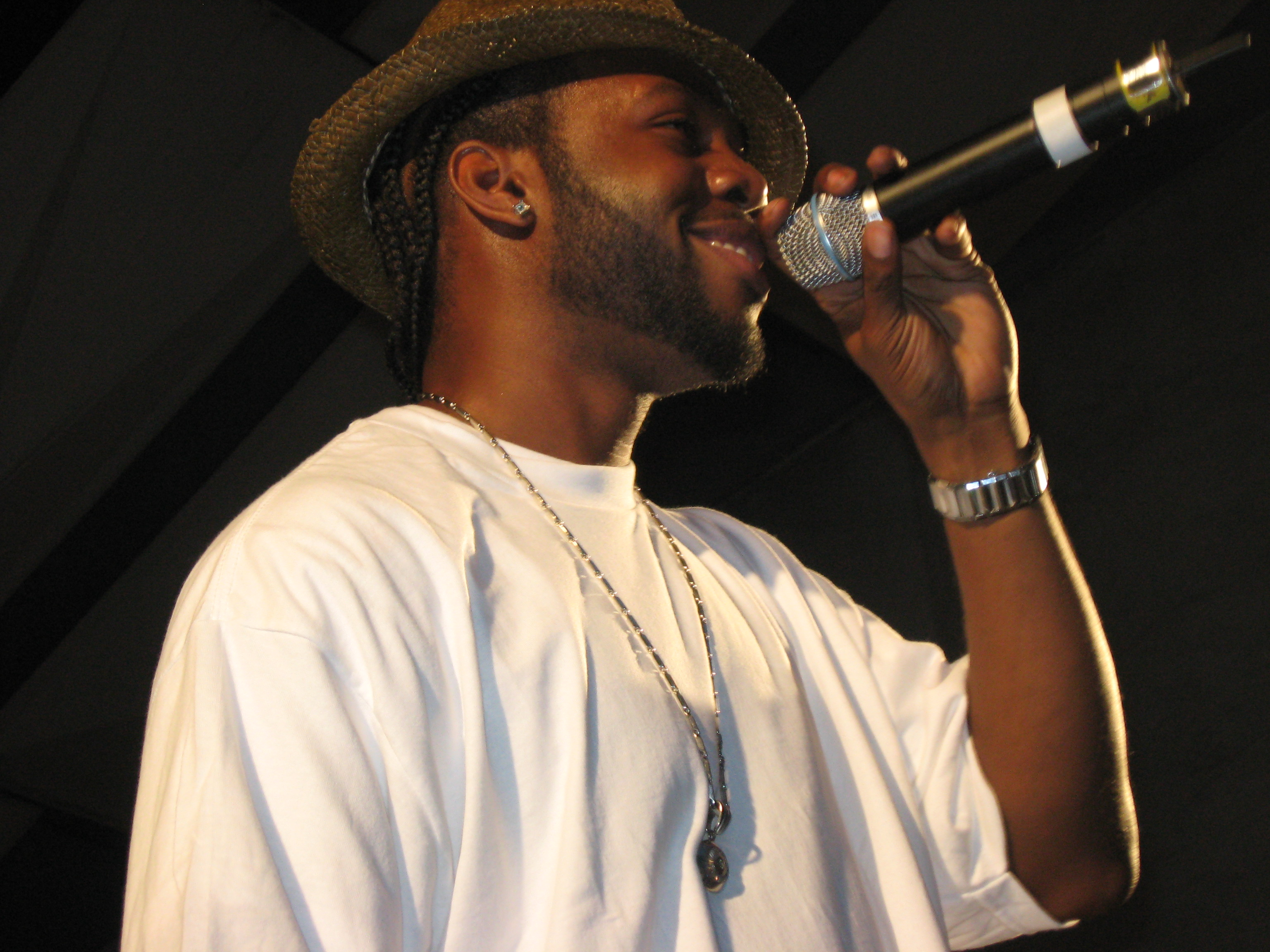
- Dwele in 2006

Background information
- Also known as: Dwele G, Elleuud
- Born: Andwele Gardner; February 14, 1978 (age 48); Detroit, Michigan, U.S.
- Genres: R&B; progressive soul
- Occupations: Singer; rapper; songwriter; record producer
- Years active: 1998–present
- Labels: E1; Koch; Virgin; Ubiquity
- Formerly of: The Dresden Soul Symphony
- Website: dwele.com

Andwele Gardner (born February 14, 1978), known professionally as Dwele (/ˈdwɛleɪ/ DWEH-lay), is an American R&B singer, rapper, songwriter and record producer from Detroit, Michigan. He is best known for his guest appearance on Kanye West's 2007 single "Flashing Lights" as well as his often-uncredited performance on West's 2010 single "Power", both of which peaked within the top 30 of the Billboard Hot 100. Gardner's 2003 debut solo single "Find a Way" narrowly entered the chart and led his debut studio album, Subject (2003), released by Virgin Records.

== Biography ==
Gardner was raised on the west side of Detroit in a musical family. He played piano from the age of six, later taking up trumpet, bass and guitar. He was deeply affected by the fatal shooting of his father outside his home when he was age ten, later stating "I learned to put my emotions into music; it was my therapy." He cites Stevie Wonder, Donny Hathaway, Roy Ayers, Miles Davis, and Freddie Hubbard as favorite artists, and took inspiration from hip hop group A Tribe Called Quest, becoming an MC, and working with Slum Village.

Gardner recorded a demo in his bedroom, called, The Rize, and sold it out of the trunk of his car. He had about 100 copies, which sold out within a week. He caught the ears of local hip hop group Slum Village and their producer J Dilla. Slum Village invited Dwele to sing the hook of the song "Tainted" for their album Trinity (Past, Present and Future). It was successful and led to more high-profile work with rapper Bahamadia, the group Lucy Pearl and London's New Sector Movement. Dwele signed to Virgin Records in 2001, and the label released his debut album, Subject in spring 2003, which mixed neo soul and hip hop.

In a 2005 review in The Independent, his style was summed up: "Dwele's rooted in vintage soul but isn't stuck in the past, overly reverential or an exercise in pastiche - there's a major hip-hop edge which betrays his original incarnation as a rapper." A second album, Some Kinda..., followed in 2005. He then later signed with RT Music Group and KOCH records in March, 2008. He released his fourth album titled, W.ants W.orld W.omen, on June 29, 2010.

Dwele was featured on the first single from Ye's fifth studio album, My Beautiful Dark Twisted Fantasy. The song is entitled "Power". He is also featured on "Flashing Lights" from West's 2007 album Graduation.

Dwele released the first single, "What Profit", from his fifth studio album Greater Than One. The song was written and produced by Mike City, the same producer behind his other singles "I Think I Love U" and "What's Not to Love". The song was sent to radio on May 22, 2012.

== Discography ==
=== Albums ===
Year	Album	Chart positions		
Year	Album	US	US Ind	US R&B
2000	Rize (self-released)	—	—	—
2003	Subject	108	—	20
2005	Some Kinda...	54	—	10
2008	Sketches of a Man	35	4	7
2010	W.ants W.orld W.omen	28	3	9
2012	Greater Than One	30	6	9
"—" denotes releases that did not chart.

=== Singles ===
Year	Title	Chart positions		Album
Year	Title	US	US R&B	Album
2003	"Find a Way"	93	42	Subject
2004	"Hold On"	—	53	Subject
2005	"I Think I Love U"	—	53	Some Kinda...
2006	"Weekend Love"	—	116	Some Kinda...
2007	"The People" (with Common)	111	56	Finding Forever
2007	"Flashing Lights" (with Kanye West)	29	12	Graduation
2008	"I'm Cheatin"	—	29	Sketches of a Man
2008	"A Few Reasons (Truth Pt.2)"	—	75	Sketches of a Man
2010	"What's Not to Love"	—	43	W.ants W.orld W.omen
2012	"What Profit"	—	38	Greater Than One
2013	"Drive the Future"	—	—	—N/a
2017	"Wanna Dance" (feat. Phife Dawg and Mike City)	—	—	—N/a
"—" denotes releases that did not chart or were not released in that territory.

=== Featured on ===
Year	Information
2000	BB Queen (Bahamadia)
2002	Trinity (Past, Present and Future) (Slum Village)
2003	New Awakening (DJ MITSU The Beats)
2004	Pure (Boney James)
2004	Detroit Deli (Slum Village)
2004	The Undeniable (Phat Kat)
2006	Shine (Boney James)
2006	SOULidified (Hil St. Soul)
2006	The Shining (J Dilla) "Dime Piece (Remix)"
2006	Dirty District Vol.3 (Brucie B.)
2006	Witness My Growth (Elzhi)
2007	Desire (Pharoahe Monch album)
2007	Nu-Mixx Klazzics Vol. 2 (2Pac) "Straight Through My Rear View"
2007	Interpretations: Celebrating the Music of Earth, Wind & Fire
2007	"The People" (with Common) from Finding Forever
2007	"Flashing Lights" (with Ye) from Graduation
2007	"Who'd of Thought" (with BrassMunk) from FEWturistic
2008	Brooklyn's Don Diva (Foxy Brown) "Never Heard This Before"
2008	Of All the Things (Jazzanova)
2008	The Dresden Soul Symphony
2008	Tronic (Black Milk) "Long Story Short" (flugelhorn solo)
2008	Man vs. Many (Nefew)
2009	Death of a Man Rebirth of a King (Pryslezz)
2010	"Lay It on the Line" & "Mad at Me" (with Marv Won) from Wayne Fontes Music
2010	"Power" (with Ye) from My Beautiful Dark Twisted Fantasy
2011	"Flower Girl" (with Maysa) from Motions of Love
2011	"Celebrity" (with Big Sean) from Finally Famous
2011	"Time Stands Still" (with DJ Quik) from The Book of David
2011	"All I Know" (with Ro Spit) from The Glass Ceiling Project
2013	"Worries" (with Robert Glasper) from Black Radio 2
2014	"Bad Boys" (with Hush) from Danny Boy: The Life & Times of a Kid in the D
2018	"2 Would Try" (with Black Milk) from Fever
2020	"Everything That's Missing" (with Big Sean) from Detroit 2
2022	"God Send" (with Phife Dawg) from Forever
