= Fantastic, Vol. 2 =

Album by Slum Village

Studio album by Slum Village
- Released: June 13, 2000
- Recorded: 1997−1998
- Genre: Hip-hop; neo soul
- Length: 74:52 (US); 67:51 (UK)
- Label: GoodVibe
- Producer: Jay Dee; Pete Rock; D'Angelo

Slum Village chronology
Fan-Tas-Tic (Vol. 1) (1997)	Fantastic, Vol. 2 (2000)	Best Kept Secret (2000)

Singles from Fantastic, Vol. 2
- 1. "Get Dis Money" Released: March 23, 1999; 2. "I Don't Know / Eyes Up" Released: August 22, 2000; 3. "Climax (Girl Shit) / CB4" Released: August 22, 2000; 4. "Raise It Up / Fall In Love (Jay Dee Remix)" Released: July 16, 2001

Fantastic, Vol. 2 (also referred to as Fantastic Volume II) is the second album by American hip-hop group Slum Village, released on June 13, 2000. During the time of its release, the group was still composed of its earliest members, T3, Baatin, and J Dilla.

== Overview ==
The album was initially completed in 1998 for A&M Records shortly before the label became obsolete, leaving Slum Village in limbo for over a year. During this period, however, the group's producer Jay Dee greatly increased his profile through work with artists such as Common, Busta Rhymes, Erykah Badu and A Tribe Called Quest. At the same time, tremendous acclaim from notables such as Questlove of The Roots and Q-Tip built up anticipation for the long-delayed LP.

Slum Village eventually found an outlet with Goodvibe Recordings & Barak Records, and released Fantastic, Vol. 2 in spring 2000. Although sales were slow (due to heavy bootlegging) the group nevertheless had a huge impact on the underground circuit and were proclaimed torch-bearers for the departing A Tribe Called Quest.

In particular, Jay Dee's much lauded production work, full of subtle grooves and soul claps, was a blueprint for the direction that neo soul would take in the coming years. The album was re-released minus the original version of "Fall-N-Love", which was replaced by the remix due to sample clearance issues, as well as their collaboration with Common, "Thelonius" (which originally appeared on Common's Like Water for Chocolate). "Raise It Up" uses a sample from the song "Extra Dry" by Thomas Bangalter of Daft Punk. It was initially used without permission, as producer J Dilla obtained a copy of the song from a bootleg recording, and assumed that the artist was an obscure producer who was unlikely to notice. Bangalter and Guy-Manuel de Homem-Christo however happened to be fans of Slum Village, and rather than demand a payment for the sample, instead asked the group to remix one of their own tracks; this ended up becoming Slum Village's remix of the song "Aerodynamic".

The album's cover was designed by Waajeed (of the group Platinum Pied Pipers).

== Critical reception and aftermath ==
Professional ratings
Review scores
Source	Rating
AllMusic	4/5 stars
Alternative Press	4/5
Entertainment Weekly	B+
The Independent	4/5 stars
Muzik	5/5 stars
NME	6/10
Pitchfork	8.5/10
Rolling Stone	3.5/5 stars
The Source	3.5/5 stars
Spin	5/10

The album received highly positive reviews and acclaim upon its release. SF Weekly commented that "(Jay Dee's) production style has been subtly influencing better-recognized producers for years" and even went as far as to claim that "Slum Village is going to single-handedly save rap music". The group themselves have since acknowledged the impact this record had, and while they benefited greatly from it, it has also overshadowed their later, though more commercially successful work.

The twelfth track "Get Dis Money" was originally featured on the soundtrack to the 1999 Mike Judge cult film Office Space. The second track "Conant Gardens" was featured in the 2002 Frankie Muniz film Big Fat Liar as well as the 2003 Steve Martin film Cheaper by the Dozen.

On February 2, 2010, the album was re-released as the two-disc Fantastic Vol. 2.10, commemorating the 10th anniversary of the original album. This Barak Records release features additional tracks, alternative versions of a few songs, instrumentals, and a different intro from the original release. It is notable for including many small skits that appear between songs that never appeared on earlier presses.

== Track listing ==
All tracks written by James Yancey, Titus Glover and R. L. Altman III, and produced by Jay Dee, except where noted.

Original pressing
No.	Title	Writer(s)	Producer(s)	Length
1.	"Intro"			1:25
2.	"Conant Gardens"			3:04
3.	"I Don't Know" (featuring DJ Jazzy Jeff)	Yancey; Glover; Altman; Charles Bobbit; James Brown		2:25
4.	"Jealousy"			4:05
5.	"Climax (Girl Shit)"			3:31
6.	"Hold Tight" (featuring Q-Tip)	Yancey; Glover; Altman; Kamaal Fareed		3:12
7.	"Tell Me" (featuring D'Angelo)	Yancey; Glover; Altman; Michael Archer	D'Angelo; Jay Dee (co.)	4:37
8.	"What's It All About" (featuring Busta Rhymes)	Yancey; Glover; Altman; Trevor Smith; Kevin McCoy		3:36
9.	"Forth and Back" (featuring Kurupt)	Yancey; Glover; Altman; Ricardo Brown Jr.		4:26
10.	"Untitled / Fantastic"			3:54
11.	"Fall in Love"			3:47
12.	"Get Dis Money"	Yancey; Glover; Altman; Allee Willis; Herbie Hancock		3:31
13.	"Raise It Up"			4:27
14.	"Once Upon a Time" (featuring Pete Rock)	Yancey; Glover; Altman; Peter Phillips	Pete Rock; Jay Dee	5:54
15.	"Players"			2:26
16.	"Eyes Up"			4:22
17.	"2U4U"			3:08
18.	"CB4"			3:45
19.	"Go Ladies"			4:43
20.	"Thelonious (featuring Common)" (hidden track)	Yancey; Glover; Altman; Lonnie Lynn		4:29
Total length:				74:52

=== 2010 re-release ===
Disc 1
No.	Title	Length
1.	"Intro"	0:21
2.	"Conant Gardens"	3:04
3.	"I Don't Know" (featuring DJ Jazzy Jeff)	2:49
4.	"Jealousy"	4:17
5.	"Climax (Girl Shit)"	3:38
6.	"Hold Tight (Jay Dee Remix)" (featuring Q-Tip)	3:01
7.	"Tell Me" (featuring D'Angelo)	4:32
8.	"What's It All About" (featuring Busta Rhymes)	4:20
9.	"Forth and Back" (featuring Kurupt)	4:19
10.	"Untitled / Fantastic"	3:53
11.	"Fall in Love"	3:55
12.	"Get Dis Money"	3:29
13.	"CB4"	3:47
14.	"Once Upon a Time (Remix)" (featuring Pete Rock)	5:19
15.	"Players"	3:03
16.	"Eyes Up"	4:23
17.	"2U4U"	3:11
18.	"The Hustle" (featuring Busta Rhymes)	3:29
19.	"Go Ladies"	4:27
20.	"We Be Dim Part. 1"	1:53
21.	"We Be Dim Part. 2"	1:49
22.	"Get It Together"	2:55

Disc 2
No.	Title	Length
1.	"Conant Gardens (Instrumental)"	2:57
2.	"I Don't Know (Instrumental)"	2:29
3.	"Climax (Instrumental)"	3:22
4.	"Hold Tight (Remix Instrumental)"	3:06
5.	"Tell Me (Instrumental)"	3:57
6.	"Untitled / Fantastic (Instrumental)"	3:11
7.	"Fall in Love (Instrumental)"	3:07
8.	"Get Dis Money (Instrumental)"	3:32
9.	"CB4 (Instrumental)"	3:26
10.	"Players (Instrumental)"	3:08
11.	"Eyes Up (Instrumental)"	4:25
12.	"2U4U (Instrumental)"	2:38
13.	"The Hustle (Instrumental)"	3:12
14.	"Go Ladies (Instrumental)"	4:03

== Outtakes ==
- "Once Upon A Time" - was originally titled "On A Mission", and was on a white label before the album's release. This version is also produced by Pete Rock, but without Jay Dee's added touches.
- "Get Dis Money" - a version with an alternative verse from Baatin.
- "The Hustle" (Ft. Busta Rhymes) - white label.
- "Beej N Dem" - one of the many tracks from Slum's demo debut "Fantastic" that was re-recorded for Volume 2, this was the last and most high-end cut of this song that was released.
- "Forth & Back" - the second of three recordings for "Forth & Back", another song concept from "Fantastic", this version uses a more radio-friendly beat, sampling Tom Browne's "Funkin' for Jamaica (N.Y.)". The order of verses remains intact, including the feature from Kurupt, except Jay, T3, and Baatin's verses are all older vocal takes with completely different lyrics.
- "2U4U" - a version with drums by Jay Dee & Karriem Riggins.

All of these outtakes are on the re-release of the album.
