= Slum Village =

American hip-hop group

- First incarnation of Slum Village, c. 1997; Left to right: Jay Dee, T3, and Baatin

Background information
- Also known as: J-88
- Origin: Detroit, Michigan, U.S.
- Genres: Hip-hop; jazz rap
- Years active: 1994–present
- Labels: Counterflow; Donut Boy; GoodVibe; Groove Attack; Capitol; Barak; Ne'Astra Music Group; E1; Traffic Entertainment Group
- Members: T3; Young RJ
- Past members: Jay Dee (deceased); Baatin (deceased); Elzhi; Illa J

Slum Village is an American hip-hop group from Detroit, Michigan. The group was formerly composed of the rappers Baatin (1974–2009), T3, and rapper / producer J Dilla (1974–2006). J Dilla left in 2001 to pursue a solo career with MCA Records. Elzhi joined in his absence, after which Baatin also left due to health complications.

Following J Dilla's death in 2006 and Baatin's death in 2009, T3 remains the sole surviving member of the original lineup. Over its history the group has been through several line-up changes, which once included J Dilla's younger brother Illa J, but now the group exists as a duo of T3 and producer Young RJ.

== Formation and early years ==
Rappers Baatin, T3 and producer Jay Dee grew up together in the Conant Gardens neighborhood of Detroit and attended Pershing High School together. Slum Village was founded by Baatin, T3 and Jay Dee.

From 1996 to 1997 the group recorded their first album Fantastic (Vol. 1), however it was not officially released until 2006, 9 years after original recording.

Slum Village signed their first record deal in 1998 with the now defunct Barak/A&M records. Due to internal politics with the label, the group was forced to release their 2000 album Best Kept Secret under the alias "J-88". Best Kept Secret featured remixes and leftover material from the heavily boot-legged Fantastic, Vol. 1. That same year Fantastic, Vol. 2 was released on GoodVibe Recordings, which featured appearances from Busta Rhymes, Common, D'Angelo, DJ Jazzy Jeff, Pete Rock, Kurupt, and Q-Tip.

== J Dilla era ==
Fresh out of high school, the group steadily became popular in Detroit's underground hip-hop scene. However, by the mid-1990s J Dilla was already a well known hip-hop prospect, with a string of singles and remixes to his name, working on projects with Janet Jackson, Pharcyde, De La Soul, Busta Rhymes, and Q-Tip among others. In 1995 he was invited to become a member of a production team known as The Ummah, which produced the fourth and fifth A Tribe Called Quest studio albums, as well as hits for a number of R&B and hip-hop musicians. In 1998, Slum Village opened for A Tribe Called Quest, on their farewell tour. In 2001, J Dilla left Slum Village to pursue a solo career.

J Dilla died on February 10, 2006, after being diagnosed with TTP and Lupus. In light of his game-changing impact in the world of music production, many high-profile artists mourned and paid tribute to him following his death.

Slum Village's 2015 album YES! features songs that were produced by Dilla before his 2006 death.

== Baatin era ==
Titus Glover (March 8, 1974 – July 31, 2009), also known as Baatin, was an American rapper who emerged from the mid-1990s underground hip-hop scene in Detroit, Michigan part of the rap group Slum Village. Baatin started rapping as a student at Pershing High School in Detroit where he went by the names Scandalous-T, and Eazy-T among others.

In the early 1990s Glover adopted the name Baatin. He claimed the name (which is Arabic for 'hidden') was chosen to reflect a newfound spirituality.

Baatin remained as an active member of the group until the early 2000s. In 2002, shortly after the release of the group's third album, Baatin began to experience health problems, which interfered with the group's music and touring performances. In regard to his health problems, he said:

The confusion started verbally. I would be angry and lash out and go crazy. I was like: Do I got demons? I couldn't control it. It was a learning experience. They said I have depression, schizophrenia with bipolar tendencies. It was bipolar when I was responding to 12 different impulses. I didn't hurt nobody.

Suffering from mental illness and a drug problem, Baatin left the group in 2003. He was later diagnosed with schizophrenia, bipolar disorder and depression. Baatin stated that he was "kicked out while in hospital", receiving a termination letter during his stay. After leaving the group, he began recording as a solo artist. During this period, he went by the name "Baatin the Slumlord." In 2008, the dispute was resolved and Baatin reunited with T3 and Elzhi, and worked on the group's sixth album Villa Manifesto.

Baatin died on July 31, 2009, at the age of 35. He was found in his home on Anglin Street in northeast Detroit. Following a homicide investigation, reports released by the Wayne County Medical Examiner's Office, state the cause of his death was cocaine abuse and the manner of death was listed as accidental.

Baatin was survived by a son, Michael Majesty Ellis, a daughter, Aura Grace Glover, and a sister, Tina, all of Detroit.

In 2010, members Baatin and Illa J were featured alongside many former collaborators of J Dilla (such as Black Milk, Phat Kat and M.E.D.) on French producer Cris Prolific's album Art / Money Volume 1 (on the tracks Foundations and Voyage respectively). J Dilla himself was slated to make a vocal appearance on the track Innovators but died before recording.

In 2018, a 7-inch posthumous single of Baatin, "Don't Stop", was released. A music video for the OG version was released the same day.

== Elzhi era ==
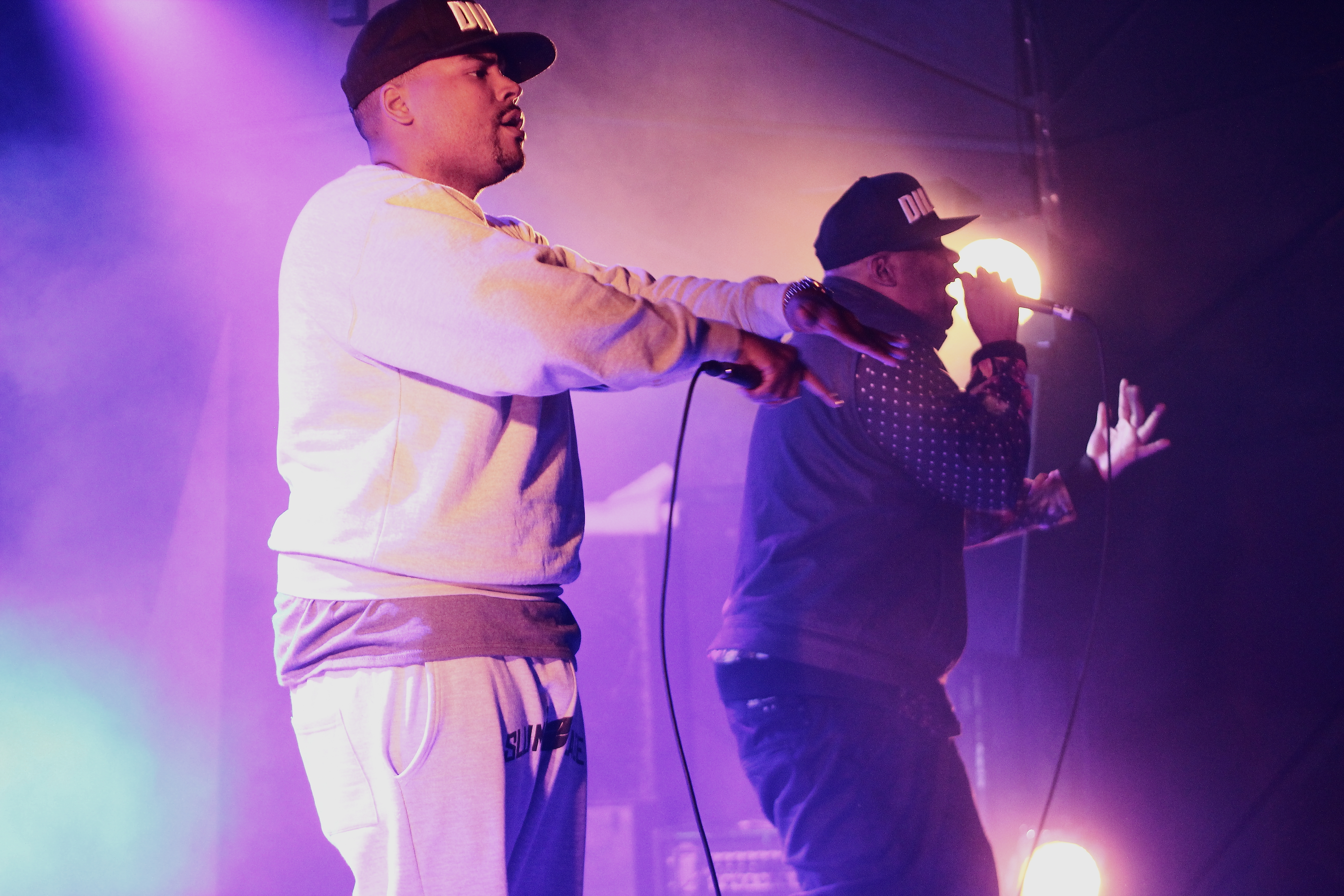
Slum Village (Young RJ & T3) performing at the Nouveau Casino in Paris in 2014

For the 2002 release Trinity (Past, Present and Future) on Barak/Capitol Records, T3 brought in Elzhi to join the group as J Dilla left to focus on his solo career. The album was a moderate success and contained the single "Tainted", produced by Karriem Riggins and featuring Dwele. Also in 2002, Dirty District, a compilation of songs by Detroit rappers largely produced by T3 and Young RJ Rice was released. The group then became a duo consisting T3 and Elzhi, when Baatin became sick while touring in France shortly before the release their 2004 album, Detroit Deli (A Taste of Detroit) and departed to seek treatment. The album included the hit single, "Selfish", produced by Kanye West and featuring John Legend. The song samples a part of the intro to the hit song "Call Me" by Aretha Franklin. After parting ways with Capitol Records in 2005, they released Prequel to a Classic a mixtape mostly previously unreleased material, followed by Slum Village "Self-Titled" release in October the same year.

In a 2008 interview, T3 announced that Slum Village had reunited with Baatin and had added Illa J to bring a "Dilla effect":

I'm incorporating Baatin, and I'm putting Illa J in — not to take Dilla's place, but just to have that Dilla essence on this new project. I'm pulling together all the producers that we've used before — Young RJ, Waajeed Karriem Riggins, Pete Rock and all the people who have been down with SV from day one.

Villa Manifesto was released under Koch Records on July 27, 2010, featuring Baatin.

In July 2010, Elzhi decided to pursue his solo career and left the group. In recent interviews, T3 stated that he had not talked to Elzhi since he departed the group. Slum Village released YES! on June 16, 2015, an album made with unused J Dilla beats, produced mostly by "Young RJRice.!

== Discography ==
=== Studio albums ===
| Year | Album | Peak chart positions | | |
| Year | Album | US | US R&B | US Ind |
|---|---|---|---|---|
| 1997 | Fan-Tas-Tic (Vol. 1): Released: July 11, 1997; Label: Counterflow; Format: CD, digital download | — | — | — |
| 2000 | Fantastic, Vol. 2: Released: June 13, 2000; Label: GoodVibe; Format: CD, digital download | 180 | 44 | — |
| 2002 | Trinity (Past, Present and Future): Released: August 13, 2002; Label: Barak, Capitol Records; Format: CD, digital download | 20 | 5 | — |
| 2004 | Detroit Deli (A Taste of Detroit): Released: June 29, 2004; Label: Capitol Records; Format: CD, digital download | 37 | 6 | — |
| 2005 | Slum Village: Released: October 25, 2005; Label: Barak Records; Format: CD, digital download | — | 80 | 33 |
| 2010 | Villa Manifesto: Released: July 27, 2010; Label: E1 Records; Format: CD, digital download | — | 37 | — |
| 2013 | Evolution: Released: June 25, 2013; Label: Ne'Astra Music; Format: CD, digital download | — | — | — |
| 2015 | Yes!: Released: June 16, 2015; Label: Ne'Astra Music; Format: CD, digital download | — | — | — |
| 2016 | Vol. 0: Released: November 15, 2016; Label: Ne'Astra Music; Format: CD, digital download | — | — | — |
| 2024 | F.U.N: Released: May 3, 2024; Label: FMG Music; Format: Digital download | — | — | — |

=== Mixtapes ===
List of mixtapes, with year released
| Title | Album details |
|---|---|
| Dirty Slums (with Mick Boogie) | Released: March 27, 2012; Label: Synchronization; Format: Digital download |
| Dirty Slums 2 (with Mick Boogie) | Released: January 29, 2013; Label: Synchronization; Format: Digital download |

=== EPs ===
| Year | EP details |
|---|---|
| 2009 | Villa Manifesto EP: Released: December 15, 2009; Label: Barak; Format: CD, digital download |
| 2014 | Vintage EP: Released: July 1, 2014; Label: Ne'Astra Music Group; Format: Vinyl |

=== Compilations ===
| Year | Album | Peak chart positions | | |
| Year | Album | US | US R&B | US Ind |
|---|---|---|---|---|
| 2000 | Best Kept Secret (under the alias J-88): Released: July 31, 2000; Label: Groove Attack; Format: CD, digital download | — | — | — |
| 2002 | Dirty District: Released: June 25, 2002; Label: Sequence Records; Format: CD, digital download | — | 78 | 25 |
| 2005 | Prequel to a Classic: Released: July 12, 2005; Label: Barak Records; Format: CD, digital download | — | — | — |

=== Singles ===
| Year | Song | Chart positions | | | Album |
| Year | Song | US | US R&B | US Rap | Album |
|---|---|---|---|---|---|
| 1999 | "Get Dis Money" | — | — | — | Fantastic, Vol. 2 |
| 2000 | "I Don't Know" | — | — | — | Fantastic, Vol. 2 |
| 2000 | "Players" | — | — | 32 | Fantastic, Vol. 2 |
| 2000 | "Climax" | — | — | — | Fantastic, Vol. 2 |
| 2001 | "Raise It Up" | — | — | — | Fantastic, Vol. 2 |
| 2002 | "Tainted" (featuring Dwele) | 87 | 31 | 20 | Trinity (Past, Present and Future) |
| 2002 | "Disco" | — | 93 | — | Trinity (Past, Present and Future) |
| 2004 | "Selfish" (featuring Kanye West and John Legend) | 55 | 20 | 15 | Detroit Deli (A Taste of Detroit) |
| 2004 | "Do You" | — | — | — | Detroit Deli (A Taste of Detroit) |
| 2005 | "EZ Up" | — | — | — | Slum Village |
| 2009 | "Dope Man" | — | — | — | Villa Manifesto EP |
| 2009 | "Cloud 9" | — | — | — | Villa Manifesto EP |
| 2009 | "Actin' Normal" | — | — | — | |
| 2010 | "Faster" (featuring Colin Munroe) | — | — | — | Villa Manifesto |

=== Appearances ===
- 2000: "One-4-Teen (Funky For You)" (from the Bahamadia album BB Queen)
- 2000: "Thelonius" (from the Common album Like Water for Chocolate)
- 2001: "LTAH" (from the Hi-Tek album Hi-Teknology)
- 2002: "Are U Ready?" (from the Jazzy Jeff EP The Magnificent EP/ For the Love of da Game)
- 2003: "Wolves" (from the Phat Kat album The Undeniable LP)
- 2004: "Say How I Feel (SV Mix)" (from the Rhian Benson mix single)
- 2004: "Da Villa" (from the Pete Rock album Soul Survivor II)
- 2004: "Aerodynamic (Slum Village Remix)" (from the Daft Punk Album Daft Club)
- 2005: "Keep On" (from the Dwele album Some Kinda...)
- 2006: "Time Has Come" (from the Exile album Dirty Science)
- 2007: "Cuz I'm Jazzy" (from the Guru album Jazzmatazz, Vol. 4)
- 2007: "Action" (from the Black Milk album Popular Demand)
- 2007: "Gangsta Boogie" (from the Pete Rock album NY's Finest)
- 2007: "Got Me Goin' (Hip Hop)" (from the Statik Selektah album Spell My Name Right: The Album)
- 2008: "Brandy" (from the Dwele album Sketches of a Man)
- 2008: "To Be Determined" (from the Evidence album The Layover EP)
- 2008: "Get Live" (from the DJ Wich album The Golden Touch)
- 2010: "How I Deal" (from the Dwele album W.ants W.orld W.omen)
- 2010: "We Do It" (from the KVBeats album The Résumé)
- 2013: "Cash Flow" (by Havoc)
- 2019: "All Day" (from Apollo Brown album Sincerely Detroit)
- 2023: "Orange Village" (from the Larry June/Alchemist album The Great Escape)
