= Eminem production discography =

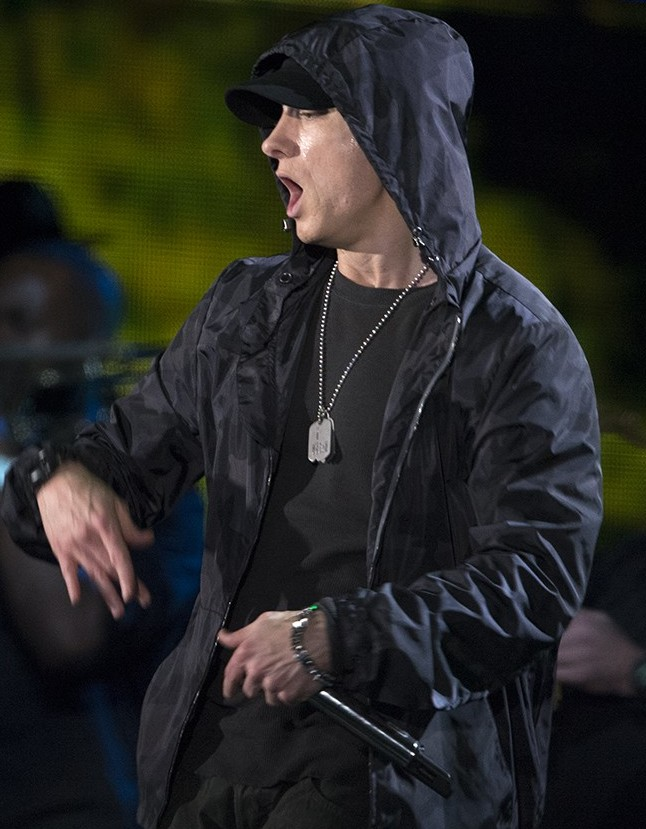
Eminem in 2014

American rapper Eminem has produced many songs by various artists/musicians, including himself.

== Singles produced ==
Song	Year	Artist	Album
"Just Don't Give a Fuck"	1999	Eminem	The Slim Shady LP
"Guilty Conscience"	1999	Eminem	The Slim Shady LP
"The Way I Am"	2000	Eminem	The Marshall Mathers LP
"Stan"	2000	Eminem	The Marshall Mathers LP
"Purple Pills"	2001	D12	Devil's Night
"Without Me"	2002	Eminem	The Eminem Show
"Cleanin' Out My Closet"	2002	Eminem	The Eminem Show
"Lose Yourself"	2002	Eminem	8 Mile: Music from and Inspired by the Motion Picture
"Superman"	2002	Eminem	The Eminem Show
"Sing for the Moment"	2002	Eminem	The Eminem Show
"My Name"	2002	Xzibit	Man vs. Machine
"One Day at a Time (Em's Version)"	2003	2Pac	Tupac: Resurrection
"Runnin' (Dying to Live)"	2003	2Pac	Tupac: Resurrection
"My Buddy"	2003	G-Unit	Beg for Mercy
"Got Some Teeth"	2003	Obie Trice	Cheers
"Shit Hits the Fan"	2003	Obie Trice	Cheers
"Don't Come Down"	2003	Obie Trice	Cheers
"Wanksta (Em's Version)"	2003	Eminem	The Singles
"On Fire"	2004	Lloyd Banks	The Hunger for More
"My Band"	2004	D12	D12 World
"Thugs Get Lonely Too"	2004	2Pac	Loyal to the Game
"Ghetto Gospel"	2004	2Pac	Loyal to the Game
"Like Toy Soldiers"	2004	Eminem	Encore
"Mockingbird"	2004	Eminem	Encore
"Rockstar"	2005	Bizarre	Hannicap Circus
"Welcome 2 Detroit"	2005	Trick-Trick	The People vs.
"When I'm Gone"	2005	Eminem	Curtain Call: The Hits
"Shake That"	2005	Eminem	Curtain Call: The Hits
"Jamaican Girl"	2006	Obie Trice	Second Round's on Me
"Smack That"	2006	Akon	Konvicted
"Hands Up"	2006	Lloyd Banks	Rotten Apple
"You Don't Know"	2006	Eminem	Eminem Presents: The Re-Up
"Jimmy Crack Corn"	2006	Eminem	Eminem Presents: The Re-Up
"'Lac Motion"	2007	Cashis	The County Hound EP
"Who Want It"	2008	Trick-Trick	The Villain
"We Made You"	2009	Eminem	Relapse
"Beautiful"	2009	Eminem	Relapse
"Elevator"	2009	Eminem	Relapse
"Not Afraid"	2010	Eminem	Recovery
"Fast Lane"	2011	Bad Meets Evil	Hell: The Sequel
"Lighters"	2011	Bad Meets Evil	Hell: The Sequel
"Legendary"	2011	Royce da 5'9"	Success Is Certain
"Let's Roll"	2011	Yelawolf	Radioactive
"Hammer Dance"	2012	Slaughterhouse	Welcome to: Our House
"My Life"	2012	Slaughterhouse	Welcome to: Our House
"Throw It Away"	2012	Slaughterhouse	Welcome to: Our House
"Goodbye"	2012	Slaughterhouse	Welcome to: Our House
"Throw That"	2012	Slaughterhouse	Welcome to: Our House
"Layin In The Cut"	2013	Cashis	The County Hound 2
"Guts Over Fear"	2014	Eminem	Shady XV
"Detroit Vs. Everybody"	2014	Eminem, Royce da 5'9", Big Sean, Danny Brown, DeJ Loaf and Trick-Trick	Shady XV
"American You"	2015	Yelawolf	Love Story
"Best Friend"	2015	Yelawolf	Love Story
"Phenomenal"	2015	Eminem	Southpaw (Music from and Inspired By the Motion Picture)
"Kings Never Die"	2015	Eminem	Southpaw (Music from and Inspired By the Motion Picture)
"Fall"	2018	Eminem	Kamikaze
"Venom"	2018	Eminem	Kamikaze
"Lucky You"	2018	Eminem, Joyner Lucas	Kamikaze
"Bang"		Conway the Machine, Eminem	Non-album single
"Darkness"	2020	Eminem	Music to Be Murdered By
"Godzilla"	2020	Eminem, Juice Wrld	Music to Be Murdered By
"The Adventures of Moon Man & Slim Shady"^{[a]}	2020	Kid Cudi, Eminem	Non-album single
"From the D 2 the LBC"	2022	Eminem, Snoop Dogg	Curtain Call 2

== Full production list ==
List of songs produced by Eminem, with performing artists, showing year released and album name
Title	Year	Performer(s)	Album	
"Maxine"^{[a]}	1996	Eminem, Mr. Porter, Three	Infinite	
"Jealousy Woes II"^{[a]}	1996	Eminem	Infinite	
"Intro (Slim Shady)"	1997	Eminem	Slim Shady EP	
"Low Down, Dirty"	1997	Eminem	Slim Shady EP	
"Just the Two of Us"^{[a]}	1997	Eminem	Slim Shady EP	
"Guilty Conscience"^{[a]}	1999	Eminem, Dr. Dre	The Slim Shady LP	
"Brain Damage"^{[a]}	1999	Eminem	The Slim Shady LP	
"If I Had"^{[a]}	1999	Eminem	The Slim Shady LP	
"'97 Bonnie & Clyde"^{[a]}	1999	Eminem	The Slim Shady LP	
"My Fault"^{[a]}	1999	Eminem	The Slim Shady LP	
"Cum On Everybody"^{[a]}	1999	Eminem, Dina Rae	The Slim Shady LP	
"Just Don't Give a Fuck"^{[a]}	1999	Eminem	The Slim Shady LP	
"As the World Turns"^{[a]}	1999	Eminem	The Slim Shady LP	
"I'm Shady"^{[a]}	1999	Eminem	The Slim Shady LP	
"Bad Meets Evil"^{[a]}	1999	Eminem, Royce da 5'9"	The Slim Shady LP	
"Still Don't Give a Fuck"^{[a]}	1999	Eminem	The Slim Shady LP	
"Stan"^{[a]}	2000	Eminem, Dido	The Marshall Mathers LP	
"The Way I Am"	2000	Eminem	The Marshall Mathers LP	
"Marshall Mathers"^{[a]}	2000	Eminem	The Marshall Mathers LP	
"Drug Ballad"^{[a]}	2000	Eminem, Dina Rae	The Marshall Mathers LP	
"Amityville"^{[a]}	2000	Eminem, Bizarre	The Marshall Mathers LP	
"Under the Influence"^{[a]}	2000	D12	The Marshall Mathers LP	
"Criminal"^{[a]}	2000	Eminem	The Marshall Mathers LP	
"The Kids"^{[a]}	2000	Eminem	The Marshall Mathers LP	
"Don't Approach Me"	2000	Xzibit, Eminem	Restless	
"Renegade"	2001	Jaÿ-Z, Eminem	The Blueprint	
"Pistol Pistol"	2001	D12	Devil's Night	
"American Psycho"	2001	D12	Devil's Night	
"That's How..."^{[a]}	2001	D12	Devil's Night	
"Purple Pills"	2001	D12	Devil's Night	
"Instigator"^{[a]}	2001	D12	Devil's Night	
"Pimp Like Me"	2001	D12, Dina Rae	Devil's Night	
"Blow My Buzz"^{[a]}	2001	D12	Devil's Night / The Wash: The Original Motion Picture Soundtrack	
"Devil's Night"^{[a]}	2001	D12	Devil's Night	
"Girls"	2001	D12	Devil's Night	
"Shit on You"^{[a]}	2001	D12	Devil's Night	
"Words Are Weapons"^{[a]}	2001	D12	Devil's Night / The Mix Tape, Vol. IV	
"These Drugs"^{[a]}	2001	D12	Devil's Night / Bones: Original Motion Picture Soundtrack	
"The Cross"	2002	Nas	God's Son	
"Curtains Up (skit)"	2002	Eminem	The Eminem Show	
"White America"^{[a]}	2002	Eminem	The Eminem Show	
"Cleanin' Out My Closet"^{[a]}	2002	Eminem	The Eminem Show	
"Square Dance"	2002	Eminem	The Eminem Show	
"The Kiss"	2002	Eminem	The Eminem Show	
"Soldier"	2002	Eminem	The Eminem Show	
"Say Goodbye to Hollywood"	2002	Eminem	The Eminem Show	
"Drips"^{[a]}	2002	Eminem, Obie Trice	The Eminem Show	
"Without Me"^{[a]}	2002	Eminem	The Eminem Show	
"Sing for the Moment"	2002	Eminem	The Eminem Show	
"Superman"	2002	Eminem, Dina Rae	The Eminem Show	
"Hailie's Song"	2002	Eminem	The Eminem Show	
"When the Music Stops"	2002	D12	The Eminem Show	
"'Till I Collapse"	2002	Eminem, Nate Dogg	The Eminem Show	
"My Name"^{[a]}	2002	Xzibit, Eminem, Nate Dogg	Man vs. Machine	
"Lose Yourself"^{[a]}	2002	Eminem	8 Mile: Music from and Inspired by the Motion Picture	
"Love Me"	2002	Obie Trice, Eminem, 50 Cent	8 Mile: Music from and Inspired by the Motion Picture	
"8 Mile"	2002	Eminem	8 Mile: Music from and Inspired by the Motion Picture	
"Places to Go"	2002	50 Cent	8 Mile: Music from and Inspired by the Motion Picture	
"Rap Game"^{[a]}	2002	D12, 50 Cent	8 Mile: Music from and Inspired by the Motion Picture	
"8 Miles and Runnin'"	2002	Jaÿ-Z, Freeway	8 Mile: Music from and Inspired by the Motion Picture	
"Rabbit Run"	2002	Eminem	8 Mile: Music from and Inspired by the Motion Picture	
"Rap Name"	2002	Obie Trice	8 Mile: Music from and Inspired by the Motion Picture	
"Stimulate"	2002	Eminem	8 Mile: Music from and Inspired by the Motion Picture	
"'Till I Collapse" (Remix)	2002	50 Cent	8 Mile: Music from and Inspired by the Motion Picture	
"Many Men (Wish Death)"^{[b]}	2003	50 Cent	Get Rich or Die Tryin'	
"High All the Time"^{[a]}	2003	50 Cent	Get Rich or Die Tryin'	
"Poor 'Lil Rich"^{[b]}	2003	50 Cent	Get Rich or Die Tryin'	
"Patiently Waiting"	2003	50 Cent, Eminem	Get Rich or Die Tryin'	
"Don't Push Me"	2003	50 Cent, Lloyd Banks, Eminem	Get Rich or Die Tryin'	
"Go to Sleep"	2003	Eminem, Obie Trice, DMX	Cradle 2 the Grave (soundtrack)	
"Moment of Clarity"	2003	Jay-Z	The Black Album	
"Freestyle"	2003	DJ Kay Slay, Eminem	The Streetsweeper	
"Ghost"	2003	2Pac	Tupac: Resurrection (soundtrack)	
"One Day at a Time (Em's Version)"	2003	2Pac, Eminem, Outlawz	Tupac: Resurrection (soundtrack)	
"Runnin' (Dying to Live)"	2003	2Pac, The Notorious B.I.G.	Tupac: Resurrection (soundtrack)	
"We As Americans"^{[a]}	2003	Eminem	Straight from the Lab	
"Love You More"^{[a]}	2003	Eminem	Straight from the Lab	
"Bully"	2003	Eminem	Straight from the Lab	
"Come on In"^{[a]}	2003	D12	Straight from the Lab	
"Nightmares"^{[b]}	2003	King Gordy	The Entity	
"The Pain"^{[b]}	2003	King Gordy	The Entity	
"When Darkness Falls"^{[b]}	2003	King Gordy	The Entity	
"Pass Me a Lighter"^{[b]}	2003	King Gordy	The Entity	
"My Buddy"^{[a]}	2003	G-Unit	Beg for Mercy	
"I'm So Hood"^{[a]}	2003	G-Unit	Beg for Mercy	
"Average Man"	2003	Obie Trice	Cheers	
"Cheers"	2003	Obie Trice	Cheers	
"Got Some Teeth"	2003	Obie Trice	Cheers	
"Lady"	2003	Obie Trice, Eminem	Cheers	
"Don't Come Down"^{[a]}	2003	Obie Trice	Cheers	
"Follow My Life"^{[a]}	2003	Obie Trice	Cheers	
"We All Die One Day"	2003	Obie Trice, Lloyd Banks, Eminem, 50 Cent	Cheers	
"Hands on You"	2003	Obie Trice, Eminem	Cheers	
"Hoodrats"^{[a]}	2003	Obie Trice	Cheers	
"Never Forget Ya"^{[a]}	2003	Obie Trice	Cheers	
"Outro"	2003	Obie Trice, D12	Cheers	
"911"	2003	Boo-Yaa T.R.I.B.E., Eminem, B-Real	West Koastra Nostra	
"Nail in the Coffin"^{[a]}	2003	Eminem	—N/a	
"The Sauce"	2003	Eminem	—N/a	
"Bump Heads"^{[a]}	2003	Eminem, G-Unit	—N/a	
"On Fire"^{[a]}	2004	Lloyd Banks	—N/a	The Hunger For More
"Warrior Part 2"	2004	Eminem, Lloyd Banks, 50 Cent, Nate Dogg		The Hunger For More
"Til the End"	2004	Lloyd Banks		The Hunger For More
"Welcome to D-Block"	2004	Eminem, Jadakiss, Styles P, Sheek Louch	Kiss of Death	
"I'm Gone" {additional production by Luis Resto}	2004	DJ Kay Slay, Eminem, Obie Trice	The Streetsweeper, Vol. 2	
"Git Up"	2004	D12	D12 World	
"Loyalty"	2004	D12, Obie Trice	D12 World	
"Just Like U"^{[b]}	2004	D12	D12 World	
"I'll Be Damned"^{[b]}	2004	D12	D12 World	
"Dude (skit)"	2004	D12	D12 World	
"My Band"	2004	D12	D12 World	
"Leave Dat Boy Alone"^{[b]}	2004	D12	D12 World	
"Get My Gun"	2004	D12	D12 World	
"Bizarre (skit)"	2004	D12	D12 World	
"Bitch"	2004	D12, Dina Rae	D12 World	
"Steve's Coffee House (skit)"	2004	D12	D12 World	
"Bugz '97 (skit)"	2004	D12	D12 World	
"Keep Talkin'"^{[b]}	2004	D12	D12 World	
"Slow Your Roll"	2004	D12	D12 World	
"Yellow Brick Road"	2004	Eminem	Encore	
"Like Toy Soldiers"	2004	Eminem	Encore	
"Puke"	2004	Eminem	Encore	
"My 1st Single"	2004	Eminem	Encore	
"Spend Some Time"	2004	Obie Trice, Eminem, Stat Quo, 50 Cent	Encore	
"Mockingbird"	2004	Eminem	Encore	
"Crazy In Love"	2004	Eminem	Encore	
"One Shot 2 Shot"	2004	D12	Encore	
"Ricky Ticky Toc"	2004	Eminem	Encore	
"Soldier Like Me (Return of the Soulja)"	2004	2Pac, Eminem	Loyal to the Game	
"The Uppercut"	2004	2Pac, E.D.I. Mean, Young Noble	Loyal to the Game	
"Out on Bail"	2004	2Pac	Loyal to the Game	
"Ghetto Gospel"	2004	2Pac	Loyal to the Game	
"Black Cotton"	2004	2Pac, Outlawz, Eminem	Loyal to the Game	
"Loyal to the Game"	2004	2Pac, G-Unit	Loyal to the Game	
"Thugs Get Lonely Too"	2004	2Pac, Nate Dogg	Loyal to the Game	
"N.I.G.G.A. (Never Ignorant Getting Goals Accomplished)"	2004	2Pac, Jadakiss	Loyal to the Game	
"Who Do You Love?"	2004	2Pac	Loyal to the Game	
"Crooked Nigga Too"	2004	2Pac	Loyal to the Game	
"Don't You Trust Me"	2004	2Pac, Dido	Loyal to the Game	
"Hennessey"	2004	2Pac, Obie Trice	Loyal to the Game	
"Thug 4 Life"	2004	2Pac	Loyal to the Game	
"I See Dead People"	2004	Redman, 2Pac, The Notorious B.I.G., Big L, Big Pun	Ill At Will, Vol. 1	
"Pale Moonlight"	2005	Strike, Eminem, Dina Rae	The Free World	
"Intro"	2005	50 Cent	The Massacre	
"In My Hood"^{[b]}	2005	50 Cent	The Massacre	
"I'm Supposed to Die Tonight"	2005	50 Cent	The Massacre	
"Gatman and Robbin'"	2005	50 Cent, Eminem	The Massacre	
"Ski Mask Way"^{[b]}	2005	50 Cent	The Massacre	
"My Toy Soldier"	2005	50 Cent, Tony Yayo	The Massacre	
"Anger Management"	2005	Eminem	Anger Management 3	
"Fubba U Cubba Cubba"	2005	Eminem	Anger Management 3	
"Dirty Steve" {skit}	2005	Eminem	Anger Management 3	
"Emulate"	2005	Obie Trice, Eminem	Anger Management 3	
"2nd Round Freestyle"	2005	Obie Trice	Anger Management 3	
"Like Dat"	2005	Stat Quo	NBA Live 06	
"We Ain't"	2005	The Game, Eminem	The Documentary	
"My Ballz"	2005	D12	The Longest Yard (soundtrack)	
"Rockstar"	2005	Bizarre	Hannicap Circus	
"Welcome 2 Detroit"	2005	Trick-Trick, Eminem	The People vs.	
"No More to Say"	2005	Trick-Trick, Proof, Eminem	The People vs.	
"Hush Is Coming"	2005	Hush, Nate Dogg	Bulletproof	
"Off to Tijuana"	2005	Hush, D12	Bulletproof	
"It Has Been Said"	2005	The Notorious B.I.G., Diddy, Eminem, Obie Trice	Duets: The Final Chapter	
"It Is What It Is"^{[b]}	2005	Tony Yayo, Spider Loc	Thoughts of a Predicate Felon	
"Drama Setter"	2005	Tony Yayo, Eminem, Obie Trice	Thoughts of a Predicate Felon	
"Pray for Me"^{[b]}	2005	Proof	Grown Man Shit	
"Ou, Ouuuuuuuuuu"^{[b]}	2005	Proof	Grown Man Shit	
"Wot's Up"^{[b]}	2005	Proof, Horny Mac	Grown Man Shit	
"Oil Can Harry"^{[b]}	2005	Proof, Eminem	Grown Man Shit	
"Without My Glock"	2005	Lloyd Banks	The Big Withdrawal	
"Intro"	2005	Eminem	Curtain Call: The Hits	
"Fack"	2005	Eminem	Curtain Call: The Hits	
"Shake That"	2005	Eminem, Nate Dogg	Curtain Call: The Hits	
"When I'm Gone"	2005	Eminem	Curtain Call: The Hits	
"They Wanna Kill Me"	2006	Obie Trice	Bar Shots	
"Wake Up"	2006	Obie Trice	Second Round's on Me	
"Violent"	2006	Obie Trice	Second Round's on Me	
"Lay Down"	2006	Obie Trice	Second Round's on Me	
"Ballad of Obie Trice"	2006	Obie Trice	Second Round's on Me	
"Jamaican Girl"	2006	Obie Trice, Brick & Lace	Second Round's on Me	
"Kill Me a Mutha"	2006	Obie Trice	Second Round's on Me	
"Out of State"^{[b]}	2006	Obie Trice	Second Round's on Me	
"All of My Life"^{[b]}	2006	Obie Trice, Nate Dogg	Second Round's on Me	
"There They Go"	2006	Obie Trice, Big Herk, Eminem, Trick-Trick	Second Round's on Me	
"Everywhere I Go"	2006	Obie Trice, 50 Cent	Second Round's on Me	
"Smack That"	2006	Akon, Eminem	Konvicted	
"Hands Up"^{[a]}	2006	Lloyd Banks, 50 Cent	Rotten Apple	
"NY NY"	2006	Lloyd Banks, Tony Yayo	Rotten Apple	
"Lord Have Mercy"	2006	Lil Scrappy	Bred 2 Die Born 2 Live	
"Shady Narcotics"	2006	Eminem	The Re-Up	
"We're Back"	2006	Eminem, Obie Trice, Stat Quo, Bobby Creekwater, Cashis	The Re-Up	
"Pistol Pistol (Remix)"	2006	Obie Trice	The Re-Up	
"Murder"	2006	Bizarre, Kuniva	The Re-Up	
"The Re-Up"	2006	Eminem, 50 Cent	The Re-Up	
"You Don't Know"	2006	50 Cent, Eminem, Cashis, Lloyd Banks	The Re-Up	
"Jimmy Crack Corn"	2006	Eminem, 50 Cent	The Re-Up	
"Trapped"	2006	Proof, Eminem	The Re-Up	
"Public Enemy #1"	2006	Eminem	The Re-Up	
"Ski Mask Way (Eminem Remix)"^{[b]}	2006	50 Cent, Eminem	The Re-Up	
"Shake That (Remix)"	2006	Bobby Creekwater, Obie Trice, Nate Dogg	The Re-Up	
"No Apologies"	2006	Eminem	The Re-Up	
"County Hound"	2007	Cashis	The County Hound EP	
"That Nigga a Gangsta"^{[b]}	2007	Cashis	The County Hound EP	
"Gun Rule"	2007	Cashis	The County Hound EP	
"Ms. Jenkins"^{[a]}	2007	Cashis	The County Hound EP	
"Thoughts of a Suicide"^{[b]}	2007	Cashis	The County Hound EP	
"Lac Motion"	2007	Cashis	The County Hound EP	
"Pistol Poppin'"^{[a]}	2007	Cashis, Eminem	The County Hound EP	
"Peep Show"	2007	50 Cent, Eminem	Curtis	
"Lose My Mind"	2007	Young Buck	Buck the World	
"Touchdown"^{[a]}	2007	T.I., Eminem	T.I. vs. T.I.P.	
"Baby Girl"	2007	Bizarre, Eminem	Hate Music	
"Drugz"	2007	Bizarre, Obie Trice	Hate Music	
"Who Want It"	2008	Trick-Trick, Eminem	The Villain	
"Follow Me"	2008	Trick-Trick	The Villain	
"Crazy"	2008	Trick-Trick, Throatslash	The Villain	
"Dr. West (skit)"	2009	Eminem	Relapse	
"Tonya (skit)"	2009	Eminem	Relapse	
"We Made You"^{[a]}	2009	Eminem	Relapse	
"Mr. Mathers (skit)"	2009	Eminem	Relapse	
"Beautiful"	2009	Eminem	Relapse	
"Steve Berman (skit)"	2009	Eminem	Relapse	
"My Darling"	2009	Eminem	Relapse	
"Careful What You Wish For"	2009	Eminem	Relapse	
"Elevator"	2009	Eminem	Refill	
"Airplanes Part II"^{[b]}	2010	B.o.B, Eminem, Hayley Williams	The Adventures of Bobby Ray	
"W.T.P."^{[b]}	2010	Eminem	Recovery	
"Not Afraid"^{[b]}	2010	Eminem	Recovery	
"Fast Lane"^{[a]}	2011	Bad Meets Evil, Sly Jordan	Hell: The Sequel	
"The Reunion"^{[a]}	2011	Bad Meets Evil	Hell: The Sequel	
"Lighters"^{[a]}	2011	Bad Meets Evil, Bruno Mars	Hell: The Sequel	
"Loud Noises"^{[b]}	2011	Bad Meets Evil, Slaughterhouse	Hell: The Sequel	
"Legendary"^{[a]}	2011	Royce Da 5'9", Travis Barker	Success Is Certain	
"Let's Roll"^{[a]}	2011	Yelawolf, Kid Rock	Radioactive	
"Throw It Up"^{[b]}	2011	Yelawolf, Gangsta Boo, Eminem	Radioactive	
"Everything I Love the Most"^{[b]}	2011	Yelawolf	Radioactive	
"In This World"^{[a]}	2011	Yelawolf	Radioactive	
"I Don't Care"^{[a]}	2012	Charles Hamilton	—N/a	
"Going No Where"	2012	Obie Trice	Bottoms Up	
"You Think I'm Crazy"	2012	Cashis	The Art of Dying	
"The Slaughter (Intro)"	2012	Slaughterhouse	Welcome to: Our House	
"Coffin"^{[a]}	2012	Slaughterhouse, Busta Rhymes	Welcome to: Our House	
"Throw That"^{[a]}	2012	Slaughterhouse, Eminem	Welcome to: Our House	
"Hammer Dance"^{[b]}	2012	Slaughterhouse	Welcome to: Our House	
"Get Up"^{[b]}	2012	Slaughterhouse	Welcome to: Our House	
"My Life"^{[a]}	2012	Slaughterhouse, Cee-Lo Green	Welcome to: Our House	
"We Did It (skit)"	2012	Slaughterhouse	Welcome to: Our House	
"Flip a Bird"^{[a]}	2012	Slaughterhouse	Welcome to: Our House	
"Throw It Away"^{[b]}	2012	Slaughterhouse, Swizz Beatz	Welcome to: Our House	
"Frat House"^{[a]}	2012	Slaughterhouse	Welcome to: Our House	
"Goodbye"^{[a]}	2012	Slaughterhouse	Welcome to: Our House	
"Park It Sideways"^{[b]}	2012	Slaughterhouse	Welcome to: Our House	
"Our Way (Outro)"^{[b]}	2012	Slaughterhouse	Welcome to: Our House	
"Asylum"	2012	Slaughterhouse, Eminem	Welcome to: Our House	
"Walk of Shame"^{[a]}	2012	Slaughterhouse	Welcome to: Our House	
"Place to Be"^{[a]}	2012	Slaughterhouse, B.o.B	Welcome to: Our House	
"Symphony In H"	2013	Tony Touch, Eminem	The Piece Maker 3: Return of the 50 MC's	
"Layin' In the Cut"^{[a]}	2013	Cashis	The County Hound 2	
"Thru the Glass"^{[a]}	2013	Cashis	The County Hound 2	
"Ask About Me"	2013	Cashis	The County Hound 2	
"Cigarello"^{[a]}	2013	Cashis	The County Hound 2	
"Parking Lot (skit)"	2013	Eminem	The Marshall Mathers LP 2	
"Rhyme or Reason"	2013	Eminem	The Marshall Mathers LP 2	
"So Much Better"	2013	Eminem	The Marshall Mathers LP 2	
"Asshole"^{[b]}	2013	Eminem, Skylar Grey	The Marshall Mathers LP 2	
"Brainless"	2013	Eminem	The Marshall Mathers LP 2	
"Stronger Than I Was"	2013	Eminem	The Marshall Mathers LP 2	
"Headlights"^{[b]}	2013	Eminem, Nate Ruess	The Marshall Mathers LP 2	
"Evil Twin"^{[b]}	2013	Eminem	The Marshall Mathers LP 2	
"Baby"	2013	Eminem	The Marshall Mathers LP 2	
"Groundhog Day"^{[a]}	2013	Eminem	The Marshall Mathers LP 2	
"Beautiful Pain"^{[a]}	2013	Eminem, Sia	The Marshall Mathers LP 2	
"Calm Down"	2014	Busta Rhymes, Eminem	Extinction Level Event 2: The Wrath of God	
"Shady XV"	2014	Eminem	Shady XV	
"Die Alone"	2014	Eminem, Kobe	Shady XV	
"Vegas"	2014	Bad Meets Evil	Shady XV	
"Guts Over Fear"^{[a]}	2014	Eminem, Sia	Shady XV	
"Fine Line"	2014	Eminem	Shady XV	
"Twisted"	2014	Skylar Grey, Eminem, Yelawolf	Shady XV	
"Right for Me"	2014	Eminem	Shady XV	
"Detroit Vs. Everybody"^{[a]}	2014	Eminem, Royce da 5'9", Big Sean, Danny Brown, Dej Loaf, Trick-Trick	Shady XV	
"Thug Boy"	2015	Cashis	The County Hound 3	
"American You"^{[a]}	2015	Yelawolf	Love Story	
"Best Friend"^{[a]}	2015	Yelawolf, Eminem	Love Story	
"Heartbreak"	2015	Yelawolf	Love Story	
"Kings Never Die"^{[b]}	2015	Eminem, Gwen Stefani	Southpaw (Music from and Inspired By the Motion Picture)	
"This Corner"	2015	Denaun	Southpaw (Music from and Inspired By the Motion Picture)	
"All I Think About"	2015	Bad Meets Evil	Southpaw (Music from and Inspired By the Motion Picture)	
"Phenomenal"	2015	Eminem	Southpaw (Music from and Inspired By the Motion Picture)	
"I Do This"	2016	Cashis	Shady Capo	
"Kill for You"	2016	Skylar Grey, Eminem	Natural Causes	
"Come Up for Air"	2016	Skylar Grey	Natural Causes	
"Believe"	2017	Eminem	Revival	
"Untouchable"	2017	Eminem	Revival	
"Like Home"^{[a]}	2017	Eminem, Alicia Keys	Revival	
"Bad Husband"^{[a]}	2017	Eminem, X Ambassadors	Revival	
"Framed"^{[a]}	2017	Eminem	Revival	
"Offended"^{[a]}	2017	Eminem	Revival	
"Majesty"^{[a]}	2018	Nicki Minaj, Eminem, Labrinth	Queen	
"The Ringer"^{[a]}	2018	Eminem	Kamikaze	
"Lucky You"	2018	Eminem, Joyner Lucas	Kamikaze	
"Stepping Stone"	2018	Eminem	Kamikaze	
"Not Alike"	2018	Eminem, Royce da 5'9	Kamikaze	
"Kamikaze"	2018	Eminem	Kamikaze	
"Fall"	2018	Eminem	Kamikaze	
"Nice Guy"	2018	Eminem, Jessie Reyez	Kamikaze	
"Good Guy"	2018	Eminem, Jessie Reyez	Kamikaze	
"Venom (from the Motion Picture)"	2018	Eminem	Kamikaze	
"Bang"^{[a]}	2019	Conway the Machine, Eminem	WWCD	
"Premonition (Intro)"	2020	Eminem	Music to Be Murdered By	
"Unaccommodating"	2020	Eminem, Young M.A	Music to Be Murdered By	
"You Gon' Learn"	2020	Eminem, Royce da 5'9", White Gold	Music to Be Murdered By	
"Those Kinda Nights"	2020	Eminem, Ed Sheeran	Music to Be Murdered By	
"In Too Deep"	2020	Eminem	Music to Be Murdered By	
"Godzilla"	2020	Eminem, Juice Wrld	Music to Be Murdered By	
"Darkness"	2020	Eminem	Music to Be Murdered By	
"Leaving Heaven"	2020	Eminem, Skylar Grey	Music to Be Murdered By	
"Stepdad"	2020	Eminem	Music to Be Murdered By	
"Marsh"	2020	Eminem	Music to Be Murdered By	
"Never Love Again"	2020	Eminem	Music to Be Murdered By	
"Farewell"	2020	Eminem	Music to Be Murdered By	
"No Regrets"	2020	Eminem, Don Toliver	Music to Be Murdered By	
"I Will"	2020	Eminem, Crooked I, Royce da 5'9", Joell Ortiz	Music to Be Murdered By	
"Coffin"^{[b]}	2020	Jessie Reyez, Eminem	Before Love Came to Kill Us	
"The Adventures of Moon Man & Slim Shady"^{[a]}	2020	Kid Cudi, Eminem	—N/a	
"Alfred (intro)"	2020	Eminem	Music to Be Murdered By: Side B	
"Black Magic"^{[b]}	2020	Eminem, Skylar Grey	Music to Be Murdered By: Side B	
"Alfred's Theme"	2020	Eminem	Music to Be Murdered By: Side B	
"Tone Deaf"^{[b]}	2020	Eminem	Music to Be Murdered By: Side B	
"Book of Rhymes"^{[b]}	2020	Eminem, DJ Premier	Music to Be Murdered By: Side B	
"Favorite Bitch"^{[a]}	2020	Eminem, Ty Dolla Sign	Music to Be Murdered By: Side B	
"Guns Blazing"^{[a]}	2020	Eminem, Dr. Dre, Sly Pyper	Music to Be Murdered By: Side B	
"Higher"	2020	Eminem	Music to Be Murdered By: Side B	
"These Demons"	2020	Eminem, MAJ	Music to Be Murdered By: Side B	
"Key (skit)"	2020	Eminem	Music to Be Murdered By: Side B	
"She Loves Me"^{[b]}	2020	Eminem	Music to Be Murdered By: Side B	
"Zeus"^{[b]}	2020	Eminem, White Gold	Music to Be Murdered By: Side B	
"Thus Far (interlude)"	2020	Eminem	Music to Be Murdered By: Side B	
"From the D 2 the LBC"	2022	Snoop Dogg, Eminem	Curtain Call 2	
"Renaissance"	2024	Eminem	The Death of Slim Shady (Coup de Grâce)	
"Habits"^{[a]}	2024	Eminem, White Gold	The Death of Slim Shady (Coup de Grâce)	
"Brand New Dance"	2024	Eminem	The Death of Slim Shady (Coup de Grâce)	
"Evil"^{[a]}	2024	Eminem	The Death of Slim Shady (Coup de Grâce)	
"All You Got (skit)"	2024	Eminem	The Death of Slim Shady (Coup de Grâce)	
"Lucifer"^{[a]}	2024	Eminem, Sly Pyper	The Death of Slim Shady (Coup de Grâce)	
"Antichrist""	2024	Eminem	The Death of Slim Shady (Coup de Grâce)	
"Fuel""^{[b]}	2024	Eminem, JID	The Death of Slim Shady (Coup de Grâce)	
"Road Rage"^{[b]}	2024	Eminem, Dem Jointz, Sly Pyper	The Death of Slim Shady (Coup de Grâce)	
"Houdini"	2024	Eminem	The Death of Slim Shady (Coup de Grâce)	
"Breaking News (skit)"	2024	Eminem	The Death of Slim Shady (Coup de Grâce)	
"Guilty Conscience 2"	2024	Eminem	The Death of Slim Shady (Coup de Grâce)	
"Head Honcho"	2024	Eminem, Ez Mil	The Death of Slim Shady (Coup de Grâce)	
"Temporary"^{[a]}	2024	Eminem, Skylar Grey	The Death of Slim Shady (Coup de Grâce)	
"Bad One"	2024	Eminem, White Gold	The Death of Slim Shady (Coup de Grâce)	
"Tobey"^{[b]}	2024	Eminem, BabyTron, Big Sean	The Death of Slim Shady (Coup de Grâce)	
"Guess Who's Back (skit)"	2024	Eminem	The Death of Slim Shady (Coup de Grâce)	
"Somebody Save Me"^{[b]}	2024	Eminem, Jelly Roll	The Death of Slim Shady (Coup de Grâce)	
"Steve Berman (skit)"	2024	Eminem	The Death of Slim Shady (Coup de Grâce) Expanded Mourner's Edition	
"Fuel (Shady Edition)"	2024	Eminem, Westside Boogie, Grip	The Death of Slim Shady (Coup de Grâce) Expanded Mourner's Edition	
"Like My Shit"	2024	Eminem	The Death of Slim Shady (Coup de Grâce) Expanded Mourner's Edition	
"Kyrie & Luka"	2024	Eminem, 2 Chainz	The Death of Slim Shady (Coup de Grâce) Expanded Mourner's Edition	

=== Notes ===
- ^{^[a]} signifies as co-producer.
- ^{^[b]} signifies as additional producer.

== See also ==
- Eminem albums discography
- Eminem singles discography
- Eminem videography
- Bad Meets Evil discography
- D12 discography
