= Brand New Dance =

Brand New Dance may refer to:

- Brand New Dance (album), 1990 album by Emmylou Harris
- "Brand New Dance" (song), 2024 song by Eminem
