= Tobey (song) =

2024 single by Eminem, Big Sean, and BabyTron

Single by Eminem, Big Sean, and BabyTron

from the album The Death of Slim Shady (Coup de Grâce)
- Released: July 2, 2024
- Studio: Effigy Studios (Detroit, MI); The Hip Hop Lab Studios (Warren, MI); Don Life Studios
- Genre: Hip-hop
- Length: 4:44
- Label: Shady; Aftermath; Interscope
- Songwriters: Marshall Mathers; Sean Anderson; James Johnson; Luis Resto; Cole Bennett; John Nocito; Daniyel Weissmann; Marvin Jordan; Carlton McDowell
- Producers: Marvy Ayy; John Nocito; Daniyel; Carlton McDowell; Cole Bennett; Eminem (add.)

Eminem singles chronology
"Houdini" (2024)	"Tobey" (2024)	"Somebody Save Me" (2024)

Big Sean singles chronology
"Shut Up" (2024)	"Tobey" (2024)	"Yes" (2024)

BabyTron singles chronology
"Drank Wars" (2024)	"Tobey" (2024)

Music video
- "Tobey" on YouTube

"Tobey" is a song by American rappers Eminem, Big Sean, and BabyTron. It was released on July 2, 2024, through Shady Records, Aftermath Entertainment, and Interscope Records as the second single from Eminem's twelfth studio album The Death of Slim Shady (Coup de Grâce). The song serves as the fourth collaboration between Eminem and Big Sean, and makes numerous references to Star Wars and Spider-Man, the latter of which has been portrayed by the song's namesake, Tobey Maguire. In Eminem's verse, he criticizes his fifth-place ranking on Billboard and Vibe's "50 Greatest Rappers of All Time" list and Melle Mel's questioning on the former's high ranking.

In promotion of the single, Eminem posted a horror-themed trailer titled "Tobey" on his social media accounts, featuring himself, Big Sean, and BabyTron. He additionally announced its release date and the Cole Bennett-directed music video. Initially set to release on July 5, it was delayed three days later due to it being considered unfinished.

"Tobey" received mixed reviews from Stereogum and music critic Anthony Fantano. The former saw it as an improvement over "Houdini" and credited the song for its standard rap performance, though he considered the concept "a little goofy". The latter criticized the instrumental, but complimented the concept and lyrics, and following its album's release, was confused by the cohesion of its placement with "Guilty Conscience 2". Commercially, "Tobey" charted at the top 30 on the Billboard Hot 100, UK Singles, and Australia singles charts, but peaked at number seven on all of their hip-hop singles charts. The song also charted in multiple countries.

== Background ==
On March 19, 2024, long-time producer and collaborator Dr. Dre revealed on Jimmy Kimmel Live! that Eminem was working on his next studio album, The Death of Slim Shady (Coup de Grâce), and that it would be releasing in 2024. During the 2024 NFL draft event in his hometown Detroit on April 26, he shared a video in the style of real crime show, Unsolved Mysteries, posed as a question of "Who killed Slim Shady?" On May 13, the album was further promoted with a fake obituary on the Detroit Free Press.

On May 21, Eminem made a cryptic post to his social media accounts, containing an iMessage chat-style video with the message "...and for my last trick!" Eminem changed his social media profile pictures to match the rabbit-in-a-top-hat emoji used in the post. On May 28, the rapper teased the album's first single, "Houdini", by posting a joint video call between himself and magician David Blaine, in which the former asked Blaine for help and a magic trick, in which he states that for his "last trick", he was going to make his career "disappear". The rapper then previewed "Houdini" by playing a short instrumental snippet, with the song title and release date revealed. On May 31, "Houdini" was released with an accompanying music video. The song later received commercial success, including its debut at number two on the Billboard Hot 100.

== Composition ==
"Tobey"
Beginning with a reference based on Tobey Maguire as Spider-Man, Eminem uses his verse to criticize his fifth place ranking on Billboard and Vibe's 50 Greatest Rappers of All Time list.

"Tobey" is a hip-hop song at a running time of four minutes and forty-four seconds. It serves as a collaborative effort from Michigan natives Eminem, Big Sean, and BabyTron. The song was produced by Eminem, Cole Bennett, Car!ton, Daniyel, Marvy Ayy, and John Nocito. "Tobey" is the fourth collaboration between Eminem and Big Sean, following "Detroit vs. Everybody" (2014), "No Favors" (2017), and "Friday Night Cypher" (2020).

Over a beat including bells and a hard rock guitar riff, BabyTron uses his hook to reference Princess Leia telling Obi-Wan Kenobi that he was her only hope in the 1977 film Star Wars and The Iron Giant's consumption of scrap metal, and Big Sean references Yoda and Wes Craven. Eminem uses his verse to criticize his fifth-place ranking on Billboard and Vibe's "50 Greatest Rappers of All Time" list and Melle Mel for questioning his high ranking; upon release, many fans interpreted some of his verse as taking shots at Jay-Z, prompting Royce da 5′9″ to opine otherwise.

== Promotion and release ==
On June 28, 2024, Eminem posted a horror-themed trailer for "Tobey" on his social media accounts, containing himself, Big Sean, and BabyTron, announcing that it would be released on July 2. Its music video, directed by Cole Bennett, was set to premiere on July 5. The trailer featured Eminem in a Jason Voorhees mask carving into a bleeding figure with a chainsaw, intended to represent Eminem's alter ego Slim Shady, followed by BabyTron rapping "Tobey Maguire got bit by a spider, but see, me, it was a goat". The video was delayed by three days after it became apparent that it was not ready, with Eminem instead releasing a short snippet in which he rapped outside his house. On July 2, "Tobey" was released through Shady Records, Aftermath Entertainment, and Interscope Records, and the second single from Eminem's twelfth studio album The Death of Slim Shady (Coup De Grâce) following "Houdini". "Tobey" marks BabyTron's first entry on the US Billboard Hot 100.

=== Cover art ===
The single cover is a reference to an Internet meme in which three Spider-Men point at each other, derived from episode nineteen of the 1967 Spider-Man television series, and the song was titled in reference to American actor Tobey Maguire, who played Spider-Man in Sam Raimi's Spider-Man film trilogy (2002–2007) and the Marvel Cinematic Universe film Spider-Man: No Way Home (2021); Eminem had previously referenced Spider-Man characters in his songs "Rap God" (2013) and "These Demons" (2020), while BabyTron had referenced the title character in his earlier single "Spidey Senses" (2023). Eminem also produced the songs "Venom" and "Last One Standing" for the Spider-Man spin-off films Venom (2018) and Venom: Let There Be Carnage (2021), respectively.

=== Music video ===
The music video for "Tobey" was directed by Cole Bennett, who previously directed Eminem's videos for "Godzilla" (2020), "Gnat" (2020), and "Doomsday Pt. 2" (2024), and was released on July 8, 2024. The video features multiple copies of each rapper delivering their verses, and contains scenes of Eminem rapping outside his childhood house and portraying his alter ego Slim Shady.

== Reception ==
Tom Breihan of Stereogum, who had previously panned "Houdini", expressed that "Tobey" was "more like it," describing the latter as "rap for rap's sake, without headline-chasing edgy jokes or forced, rushed cadences." He also opined that the song's central concept was "a little goofy," but felt that it worked. Upon release, Anthony Fantano criticized the instrumental, but admired the concept and lyrics and felt that the track was a "big Detroit deal" on the grounds that the track comprised "three generations of Detroit artists". Upon reviewing The Death of Slim Shady (Coup de Grâce), however, he felt that Eminem's lyrics made its narrative "a little confusing" due to the conflicting messages he was getting from "Tobey" and the album's "Guilty Conscience 2".

Upon the release of "Tobey", the song debuted in multiple countries. "Tobey" peaked at number 24 on the Billboard Hot 100 and number seven on the Hot R&B/Hip-Hop Songs chart. Additionally, it peaked at number 23 on the Global 200. In both the UK and Australia, it peaked at number 29 on their singles charts and number seven on their hip-hop singles charts. Elsewhere, "Tobey" charted in Canada, New Zealand, Switzerland, Greece, Ireland, Finland, Austria, Germany, Slovakia, Sweden, Lithuania, the Netherlands, the Czech Republic, and Portugal. By the end of 2024, "Tobey" ranked at number 86 on the Hot R&B/Hip-Hop Songs year-end chart. In terms of music certification, the song is certified as Gold by both Music Canada and Pro-Música Brasil for exceeding 40,000 and 20,000 units, respectively.

== Personnel ==
Credits were adapted from Tidal and the liner notes of The Death of Slim Shady (Coup de Grâce).

Locations

- Recorded at Effigy Studios, Detroit, Michigan
- Recorded at The Hip Hop Lab Studios, Warren, Michigan
- Recorded at Don Life Studios

Musicians

- Eminem – primary artist, vocals, songwriter, additional producer
- Big Sean – primary artist, vocals, songwriter
- BabyTron – primary artist, vocals, songwriter
- Luis Resto – keyboards, songwriter
- Cole Bennett – producer, songwriter
- Carlton McDowell – producer, songwriter
- Daniyel – producer, songwriter
- John Nocito – producer, songwriter
- Marvy Ayy – producer, songwriter

Technical

- Mike Strange – recording engineer, mixing engineer
- Tony Campana – recording engineer
- Tom Kahre – recording engineer
- Milan Becker – recording engineer
- Brian Gardner – mastering engineer
- James Johnson – recording engineer

== Charts ==
=== Weekly charts ===
Weekly chart performance for "Tobey"
Chart (2024)	Peak position
Australia (ARIA)	29
Australia Hip Hop/R&B (ARIA)	7
Austria (Ö3 Austria Top 40)	58
Canada Hot 100 (Billboard)	21
Czech Republic Singles Digital (ČNS IFPI)	97
Finland (Suomen virallinen lista)	48
Germany (GfK)	65
Global 200 (Billboard)	23
Greece International (IFPI)	38
Ireland (IRMA)	43
Lithuania (AGATA)	84
Netherlands (Single Top 100)	86
New Zealand (Recorded Music NZ)	25
Portugal (AFP)	99
Slovakia Singles Digital (ČNS IFPI)	69
Sweden (Sverigetopplistan)	74
Switzerland (Schweizer Hitparade)	31
UK Singles (Official Charts)	29
UK Hip Hop/R&B (Official Charts)	7
US Billboard Hot 100	24
US Hot R&B/Hip-Hop Songs (Billboard)	7

=== Year-end charts ===
2024 year-end chart performance for "Tobey"
Chart (2024)	Position
US Hot R&B/Hip-Hop Songs (Billboard)	86

== Certifications ==
Certifications for "Tobey"
Region	Certification	Certified units/sales
Brazil (Pro-Música Brasil)	Gold	20,000^{‡}
Canada (Music Canada)	Gold	40,000^{‡}
^{‡} Sales+streaming figures based on certification alone.
