= Evil (Eminem song) =

2024 song by Eminem

Song by Eminem

from the album The Death of Slim Shady (Coup de Grâce)
- Released: July 12, 2024
- Genre: Hip hop
- Length: 3:50
- Label: Shady; Aftermath; Interscope
- Songwriters: Marshall Mathers III; Luis Resto; Donald Cannon; Tim Gomringer; Kevin Gomringer
- Producers: Don Cannon; Cubeatz; Eminem

"Evil" is a song by American rapper Eminem from his twelfth studio album The Death of Slim Shady (Coup de Grâce) (2024). It was produced by Don Cannon, Cubeatz and Eminem himself.

== Composition ==
The song finds Eminem rapping with the purpose of sparking controversy, such as referring to "the good kind of gay" as "two men [who] fuck each other".

== Critical reception ==
Karan Singh of HipHopDX wrote in a review of The Death of Slim Shady (Coup de Grâce) that "Eminem repeatedly feels the need to spoon-feed the implications of his lyrics to clarify where he's coming from. Scattered between the countless provocations are explanations designed to make dim people feel smart and slow ones feel quick-witted as he seems to be under the impression that his childish bars might fly over his listeners' heads", mentioning the song's lyrics concerning the meaning of the word "gay" as an example. Dash Lewis of Pitchfork commented "He's still good for a dumb laugh, even if it's a bit of a walk: 'Call this sex ed with a splash of necrophilia / 'Cause when I say that I'm really the evilest, I'm fucking deadass' from the otherwise bloodless 'Evil.'"

== Charts ==
Chart performance for "Evil"
Chart (2024)	Peak position
Australia (ARIA)	32
Canada Hot 100 (Billboard)	25
Global 200 (Billboard)	30
New Zealand (Recorded Music NZ)	22
Portugal (AFP)	105
Sweden Heatseeker (Sverigetopplistan)	3
UK Hip Hop/R&B (OCC)	6
US Billboard Hot 100	30
US Hot R&B/Hip-Hop Songs (Billboard)	11
