= Somebody Save Me (Eminem song) =

Single by Eminem featuring Jelly Roll

from the album The Death of Slim Shady (Coup de Grâce)
- Released: July 19, 2024
- Genre: Country hip-hop; conscious hip-hop
- Length: 3:50
- Label: Shady; Aftermath; Interscope
- Songwriters: Marshall Mathers III; Luis Resto; Emile Haynie; Benjamin Levin; David Ray Stevens; Jason DeFord
- Producers: Benny Blanco; Emile; Eminem

Eminem singles chronology
"Tobey" (2024)	"Somebody Save Me" (2024)	"Murdergram Deux" (2024)

Jelly Roll singles chronology
"I Am Not Okay" (2024)	"Somebody Save Me" (2024)	"Lonely Road" (2024)

Music video
- "Somebody Save Me" on YouTube

"Somebody Save Me" is a song by American rapper Eminem featuring fellow American musician Jelly Roll, originally released on July 12, 2024, as a track from the former's twelfth studio album The Death of Slim Shady (Coup de Grâce), before later being released as the album's third and final single a week later on July 19, 2024.

A music video for the song was released August 21, 2024.

== Background and release ==
In January 2020, Eminem released his eleventh studio album, Music to Be Murdered By. The album was critically and commercially successful, producing singles such as "Godzilla", which peaked at number 3 on the Billboard Hot 100. After the success of the album, he began working on his twelfth studio album in collaboration with Dr. Dre, with the album's production being confirmed on Jimmy Kimmel Live! on March 19, 2024. The album, named The Death of Slim Shady (Coup de Grâce), was formally announced on April 26 after the 2024 NFL draft through a trailer depicting a news story about the death of Eminem's alter ego, Slim Shady. The album was released on July 12, 2024; "Somebody Save Me" is the nineteenth and final song on the standard track list. On July 19, 2024, the song was released as a single.

On September 11, 2024, Eminem performed "Somebody Save Me", along with "Houdini", live at the MTV Video Music Awards.

== Composition and lyrics ==
"Somebody Save Me" is a country hip-hop song performed primarily by Eminem, with parts of the song being sampled from Jelly Roll's 2020 single "Save Me". Additional producers for the song include Emile Haynie, Benny Blanco, Luis Resto, and David Ray.

The lyrics of "Somebody Save Me" are about Eminem's relationship with his family during his past drug addiction, and are written from the perspective of an alternate reality where he died before his daughter Hailie's graduation. The song opens up with a recording of one of his children, Alaina, begging him to eat dinner which he denies. All three verses of the song is dedicated to one of his kids, namely Alaina, Hailie, and Stevie, apologizing for his addiction disrupting the family. He openly regrets not being able to be a proper father, saying he "[doesn't] even deserve the father title." After the songs intro and in between each verse, a snippet of Jelly Roll's "Save Me" plays, where he says "somebody save me, me from myself" among other parts of the original song after each verse.

== Critical reception ==
In a ranking of every song from The Death of Slim Shady, Billboard's Michael Saponara considered "Somebody Save Me" to be the album's best song, describing it as a "teary-eyed" ending. A staff writer of Sputnikmusic wrote that "Somebody Save Me" alongside "Temporary" and "Bad One" were songs that retained issues that he believed Eminem's songs had in recent years, but were still a "massive improvement".

Louder's Merlin Alderslade stated that the song was a poor ending to the album, describing Jelly Roll's chorus as "schmaltzy and irritating".

== Music video ==
The music video for "Somebody Save Me" directed by Emil Nava, was released on August 21, 2024. The video includes snippets of home footage and clips from Hailie Jade's "Just a Little Shady" podcast, alongside scenes of Eminem reflecting on his past. The rapper is depicted watching memories unfold behind a one-way mirror. The video also features Jelly Roll, who appears in an empty room with flickering lights, performing the chorus.

== Charts ==
Chart performance for "Somebody Save Me"
Chart (2024)	Peak position
Australia (ARIA)	48
Australia Hip Hop/R&B (ARIA)	18
Canada Hot 100 (Billboard)	22
Global 200 (Billboard)	31
Ireland (IRMA)	60
New Zealand (Recorded Music NZ)	31
San Marino (SMRRTV Top 50)	18
Sweden Heatseeker (Sverigetopplistan)	6
South Africa (TOSAC)	97
Switzerland (Schweizer Hitparade)	94
UK Singles Downloads (Official Charts)	32
UK Singles Sales (OCC)	35
UK Hip Hop/R&B (Official Charts)	10
US Billboard Hot 100	27

== Certifications ==
Region	Certification	Certified units/sales
Brazil (Pro-Música Brasil)	Gold	20,000^{‡}
Canada (Music Canada)	Gold	40,000^{‡}
New Zealand (RMNZ)	Gold	15,000^{‡}
United Kingdom (BPI)	Silver	200,000^{‡}
^{‡} Sales+streaming figures based on certification alone.
