= Houdini (Eminem song) =

Single by Eminem

from the album The Death of Slim Shady (Coup de Grâce)
- Released: May 31, 2024
- Genre: Hip-hop
- Length: 3:47
- Label: Shady; Aftermath; Interscope
- Songwriters: Marshall Mathers III; Jeff Bass; Anne Dudley; Steve Miller; Trevor Horn; Kevin Bell; Malcolm McLaren
- Producers: Eminem; Luis Resto

Eminem singles chronology
"Lace It" (2023)	"Houdini" (2024)	"Tobey" (2024)

Music video
- "Houdini" on YouTube

"Houdini" is a song by American rapper Eminem, and is the lead single from his twelfth studio album, The Death of Slim Shady (Coup de Grâce). The song was produced by Eminem and Luis Resto, and was released through Shady Records, Aftermath Entertainment, and Interscope Records on May 31, 2024. It interpolates multiple previous Eminem works, as well as "Abracadabra" by the Steve Miller Band; Jeff Bass, Anne Dudley, Steve Miller, Trevor Horn, DJ Head, and Malcolm McLaren are credited as songwriters due to the interpolations.

Released alongside an accompanying music video, "Houdini" debuted at the top of the Billboard Global 200. It also topped the charts in Australia, Austria, Canada, Iceland, Latvia, Luxembourg, Morocco, New Zealand, Norway, South Africa, Switzerland, and the United Kingdom, and has reached the top ten of the charts in Belgium, Czechia, Finland, Germany, Hungary, India, Ireland, Israel, Lithuania, the Netherlands, Portugal, Romania, Slovakia, Sweden, and the United States.

== Release and composition ==
In April 2024, Eminem announced his twelfth studio album, The Death of Slim Shady (Coup de Grâce), to be released in mid-2024. Three weeks later, he shared an iMessage screenshot with a cryptic message that says "...and for my last trick!", sent to all of his contacts. The date for the message read May 31, hinting at an upcoming release. On May 28, the rapper posted a joint video call between himself and magician David Blaine, in which the former asked Blaine for help and a magic trick to which the latter responds by drinking a glass of wine and then eating it; Eminem then states that for his "last trick", he was going to make his career "disappear". The rapper then previews the track by playing a short instrumental snippet. At the end of the clip, the song title and release date are revealed.

"Houdini" was released on May 31, 2024. A hip-hop song, "Houdini" interpolates Eminem's "Without Me", "My Name Is", and "Just Lose It", as well as the 1982 song "Abracadabra" by the Steve Miller Band. The day after release, Steve Miller praised Eminem as "one of those timeless originators building something new on a long musical legacy of original artists".

The lyrics reference Harry Houdini, after whom the song is named, as well as the Sherri Papini kidnapping hoax, RuPaul's testicles, and the Black Eyed Peas in a pun on R. Kelly's urolagnia. They also reference Eminem's controversy over homophobic lyrics in his earlier career, and imply that the "old" Eminem would consider "the way shit is today" to be "gay". Eminem also calls his manager Paul Rosenberg a "male cross-dresser" and a "fake ass bitch", before saying "fuck" those giving him "shit" for that, Dr. Dre, Jimmy Iovine, himself, the listener, and Eminem's own children. The song's lyrics also inquire as to whether a collaboration with Megan Thee Stallion would give Eminem "a shot at a feat", a reference to her being shot in the foot by Tory Lanez, fantasize about hitting an eight-year-old child in the face with a participation trophy, and assert that Eminem's "transgender cat" is Siamese, "identifies as black", and "acts Chinese".

== Music video ==
The music video for "Houdini", directed by Rich Lee, who previously directed Eminem's videos for "Not Afraid", "Rap God", "The Monster", "Phenomenal", "Walk on Water" and "Venom", was released alongside the single on May 31, 2024. The video's AI-generated recreation of Eminem's late-1990s Slim Shady persona was produced by Metaphysic, whose models were trained on footage from that period. The music video is set in a Gotham City-esque city. Eminem, who is in bed, receives a message from Dr. Dre that his alter ego Slim Shady, time traveled through a portal from 2002 to the events of the music video. He turns into his "Rap Boy" persona from "Without Me" (The Eminem Show, 2002) and joins Dre in a yellow sports car. The two drive around the city while tracking down Shady, who takes a shortcut through the city stadium and interrupts a junior sports competition. He then hurries over to the communications tower, attempting to cancel Eminem and Dre. Eminem climbs the tower and confronts his alter ego. It results in Eminem and Shady combining into one person. The news is sent worldwide via satellite. When he gets back in the car, Dr. Dre leaves and another Eminem/Shady character enters the driver's seat before the two drive away into the night.

The music video features cameo appearances from fellow rappers 50 Cent, Snoop Dogg, Royce da 5′9″, Denaun Porter, along with Westside Boogie, Grip, and Ez Mil, signed at the time to Eminem's record label Shady Records, record producer the Alchemist, comedians Shane Gillis and Pete Davidson, adult film actresses Samantha Mack and Ryan Keely, Eminem's manager Paul Rosenberg, Interscope Records co-founder and executive Jimmy Iovine, and Eminem's own children.

== Reception ==
Andrew R. Chow of Time stated that the song was "revolting his critics". Stereogum's Tom Breihan was not impressed with "Houdini", writing that it was "truly amazing" that Eminem had continued "to find new ways to get even shittier" and opined that he and Luis Resto had managed to make "Abracadabra" "sound even more like circus music". He also described the lyrics as "full of hack-ass jokes about how everything is too woke now" and Eminem's cadences as "cluttered and unpleasant", and wrote that listeners could "make a fucking bingo card" out of the song. Eddie Fu of Consequence wrote that Eminem "sounds like ass" on the track, opined that his customary potshots at celebrities were "more predictable and boring than shocking and clever", and stated that his publication "could also do without his complaining about being 'targeted' by the TikTok backlash" given that "leaning into controversy" had been his strategy throughout his entire career.

A more positive review came from Brian McCollum of the Detroit Free Press, who praised the song as a "catchy throwback" with "clever, multilayered wordplay". Robin Murray of Clash described the song as a "perfectly timed dose of cartoonish fan service, a colorful, occasionally shocking (and occasionally boring) dose of ultra-colorful chart rap", though felt the use of "gay" as a slur rankled and that the verse about Eminem's "transgender cat" was "corny as hell", and wrote that "Houdini" failed to "escape the lingering stench of the era it embodies". In addition, Lindsay Zoladz of The New York Times felt that the track's "garish, carnivalesque beat", over which Eminem "surveys the current cultural moment and strings together some stiltedly rapped jokes [while] desperate to offend at every turn", was "exhausting". The video won Best Visual Effects at the 2024 MTV Video Music Awards, credited to Metaphysic, production company Synapse, and director Rich Lee.

== Commercial performance ==
"Houdini" debuted at number two on the US Billboard Hot 100 on the chart dated June 15, 2024, with 48.8 million streams and 49,000 copies sold. It became his 23rd top ten song in his native country and his highest-charting single since "The Monster" a decade earlier. "Houdini" also received significant airplay on Alternative Radio, and debuted at No. 35 on the US Alternative Airplay chart dated July 7, 2024, making it his first song in nearly 22 years to enter the chart since "Lose Yourself" in 2002, and his fifth overall song on the chart.

In Canada, "Houdini" entered the Canadian Hot 100 at number one, and is his sixth track to reach the summit.

In the United Kingdom, "Houdini" debuted at the top of the UK Singles Chart on June 7, 2024 – for the week ending date June 13, 2024 – with 104,800 chart units including 13.3 million streams. It became Eminem's 11th chart-topping song in Britain, his first since "Godzilla" with Juice Wrld in January 2020, and his first without a feature since "Like Toy Soldiers" in February 2005. This was Eminem's best first-week performance on the UK Singles Chart since "Without Me" in May 2002. It remained at the top of the chart for two weeks, becoming his first song to hold the summit of the UK Singles Chart for more than one week.

The song also topped the ARIA Singles Chart in Australia, where it became the first Eminem song to feature on the charts since "The Monster" (featuring Rihanna) in 2013, and the first without a feature since "We Made You" in 2009. "Houdini" became the eighth Eminem song to reach number one in Australia.

== Live performance ==
On September 11, 2024, Eminem performed "Houdini", along with "Somebody Save Me", live at the 2024 MTV Video Music Awards.

== Accolades ==
Awards and nominations for "Houdini"
Organization	Year	Category	Result	Ref.
MTV Europe Music Awards	2024	Best Video	Nominated	
MTV Video Music Awards	2024	Video of the Year	Nominated	
MTV Video Music Awards	2024	Best Hip-Hop	Won	
MTV Video Music Awards	2024	Best Direction	Nominated	
MTV Video Music Awards	2024	Best Editing	Nominated	
MTV Video Music Awards	2024	Best Visual Effects	Won	
MTV Video Music Awards	2024	Song of Summer	Nominated	
Grammy Awards	2025	Best Rap Performance	Nominated	
Grammy Awards	2025	Best Music Video	Nominated	

== Charts ==
=== Weekly charts ===
Weekly chart performance for "Houdini"
Chart (2024–2025)	Peak position
Argentina Airplay (Monitor Latino)	11
Australia (ARIA)	1
Australia Hip Hop/R&B (ARIA)	1
Austria (Ö3 Austria Top 40)	1
Belarus Airplay (TopHit)	48
Belgium (Ultratop 50 Flanders)	7
Belgium (Ultratop 50 Wallonia)	9
Bolivia Airplay (Monitor Latino)	15
Bulgaria Airplay (PROPHON)	1
Canada Hot 100 (Billboard)	1
Canada CHR/Top 40 (Billboard)	34
Canada Hot AC (Billboard)	40
Central America Airplay (Monitor Latino)	17
Chile Anglo Airplay (Monitor Latino)	11
Colombia Anglo Airplay (Monitor Latino)	5
CIS Airplay (TopHit)	31
Costa Rica Airplay (Monitor Latino)	14
Croatia International Airplay (Top lista)	3
Croatia Streaming (Billboard)	5
Czech Republic Airplay (ČNS IFPI)	14
Czech Republic Singles Digital (ČNS IFPI)	5
Denmark (Tracklisten)	5
Dominican Republic Anglo Airplay (Monitor Latino)	7
Ecuador Airplay (Monitor Latino)	18
Estonia Airplay (TopHit)	6
El Salvador Airplay (Monitor Latino)	9
Finland (Suomen virallinen lista)	4
France (SNEP)	37
Germany (GfK)	3
Greece International Streaming (IFPI)	2
Guatemala Anglo Airplay (Monitor Latino)	1
Global 200 (Billboard)	1
Hungary (Editors' Choice Top 40)	1
Hungary (Single Top 40)	3
Honduras Airplay (Monitor Latino)	9
Iceland (Tónlistinn)	1
India International Streaming (IMI)	7
Israel (Mako Hitlist)	20
Ireland (IRMA)	2
Italy (FIMI)	43
Japan Hot Overseas (Billboard Japan)	5
Latin America Anglo Airplay (Monitor Latino)	1
Kazakhstan Airplay (TopHit)	91
Latvia Airplay (LaIPA)	1
Latvia Streaming (LaIPA)	1
Lebanon (Lebanese Top 20)	14
Lithuania (AGATA)	5
Lithuania Airplay (TopHit)	1
Luxembourg (Billboard)	1
Malaysia (Billboard)	23
Malaysia International Streaming (RIM)	16
Mexico Anglo Airplay (Monitor Latino)	5
Middle East and North Africa (IFPI)	1
Netherlands (Dutch Top 40)	6
Netherlands (Single Top 100)	8
New Zealand (Recorded Music NZ)	1
Nicaragua Anglo Airplay (Monitor Latino)	2
Nigeria (TurnTable Top 100)	86
North Africa (IFPI)	15
Norway (VG-lista)	1
Panama Anglo Airplay (Monitor Latino)	7
Paraguay Airplay (Monitor Latino)	8
Peru Anglo Airplay (Monitor Latino)	5
Poland (Polish Airplay Top 100)	5
Poland (Polish Streaming Top 100)	10
Portugal (AFP)	3
Puerto Rico Anglo Airplay (Monitor Latino)	2
Romania Streaming (Billboard)	4
Romania Airplay (Media Forest)	1
Russia Airplay (TopHit)	128
San Marino Airplay (SMRTV Top 50)	10
Saudi Arabia (IFPI)	2
Singapore (RIAS)	11
Slovakia Airplay (ČNS IFPI)	1
Slovakia Singles Digital (ČNS IFPI)	3
South Africa Streaming (TOSAC)	1
South Korea BGM (Circle)	84
South Korea Download (Circle)	80
Spain (Promusicae)	73
Sweden (Sverigetopplistan)	3
Switzerland (Schweizer Hitparade)	1
Turkey International Airplay (Radiomonitor Türkiye)	4
Ukraine Airplay (TopHit)	70
United Arab Emirates (IFPI)	2
UK Singles (Official Charts)	1
UK Hip Hop/R&B (Official Charts)	1
Uruguay Anglo Airplay (Monitor Latino)	6
US Billboard Hot 100	2
US Adult Pop Airplay (Billboard)	14
US Hot R&B/Hip-Hop Songs (Billboard)	1
US Pop Airplay (Billboard)	10
US Rhythmic Airplay (Billboard)	2
US Rock & Alternative Airplay (Billboard)	29
Venezuela Airplay (Record Report)	59

=== Monthly charts ===
Monthly chart performance for "Houdini"
Chart (2024)	Peak position
Belarus Airplay (TopHit)	68
CIS Airplay (TopHit)	34
Estonia Airplay (TopHit)	9
Latvia Airplay (TopHit)	6
Lithuania Airplay (TopHit)	4
Romania Airplay (TopHit)	41
Slovakia (Rádio – Top 100)	2
Ukraine Airplay (TopHit)	79

=== Year-end charts ===
Year-end chart performance for "Houdini"
Chart (2024)	Position
Australia (ARIA)	32
Australia Hip Hop/R&B (ARIA)	4
Austria (Ö3 Austria Top 40)	24
Belgium (Ultratop 50 Flanders)	45
Belgium (Ultratop 50 Wallonia)	40
Canada (Canadian Hot 100)	21
CIS Airplay (TopHit)	143
Denmark (Tracklisten)	86
Estonia Airplay (TopHit)	21
Germany (GfK)	30
Global 200 (Billboard)	72
Iceland (Tónlistinn)	39
Netherlands (Dutch Top 40)	45
Netherlands (Single Top 100)	73
New Zealand (Recorded Music NZ)	31
Poland (Polish Airplay Top 100)	41
Sweden (Sverigetopplistan)	82
Switzerland (Schweizer Hitparade)	27
UK Singles (OCC)	26
US Billboard Hot 100	39
US Hot R&B/Hip-Hop Songs (Billboard)	13
US Mainstream Top 40 (Billboard)	38
US Rhythmic (Billboard)	32

Year-end chart performance for "Houdini"
Chart (2025)	Position
Belgium (Ultratop 50 Wallonia)	179

== Certifications ==
Certifications for "Houdini"
Region	Certification	Certified units/sales
Austria (IFPI Austria)	Platinum	30,000^{‡}
Belgium (BRMA)	Platinum	40,000^{‡}
Brazil (Pro-Música Brasil)	3× Platinum	120,000^{‡}
Canada (Music Canada)	3× Platinum	240,000^{‡}
Denmark (IFPI Danmark)	Gold	45,000^{‡}
France (SNEP)	Gold	100,000^{‡}
Germany (BVMI)	Gold	300,000^{‡}
Italy (FIMI)	Gold	50,000^{‡}
New Zealand (RMNZ)	2× Platinum	60,000^{‡}
Poland (ZPAV)	2× Platinum	100,000^{‡}
Portugal (AFP)	Gold	5,000^{‡}
Switzerland (IFPI Switzerland)	Platinum	30,000^{‡}
United Kingdom (BPI)	Platinum	600,000^{‡}
Streaming
Greece (IFPI Greece)	Gold	1,000,000^{†}
^{‡} Sales+streaming figures based on certification alone.^{†} Streaming-only figures based on certification alone.

== See also ==
- List of Billboard Hot R&B/Hip-Hop Songs number ones of 2024
- List of Canadian Hot 100 number-one singles of 2024
- List of number-one singles of 2024 (Australia)
- List of number-one singles of the 2020s (Norway)
- List of UK singles chart number ones of the 2020s
