= Guilty Conscience (song) =

1999 single by Eminem

Single by Eminem featuring Dr. Dre

from the album The Slim Shady LP
- Released: June 8, 1999
- Recorded: March–May 1998
- Genre: Comedy hip hop; horrorcore
- Length: 3:19
- Label: Aftermath; Interscope; Web
- Songwriters: Marshall Mathers; Andre Young
- Producers: Dr. Dre; Eminem (co.)

Eminem singles chronology
"Role Model" (1999)	"Guilty Conscience" (1999)	"Dead Wrong" (1999)

Dr. Dre singles chronology
"Zoom" (1998)	"Guilty Conscience" (1999)	"Still D.R.E." (1999)

Music video
- "Guilty Conscience" on YouTube

"Guilty Conscience" is a song written, produced, and performed by American rapper Eminem featuring fellow American rapper Dr. Dre. It was released as the third and final single from the former's The Slim Shady LP (1999). It was also released on his 2005 greatest hits album Curtain Call: The Hits.

Eminem's 2024 album The Death of Slim Shady (Coup de Grâce) features a sequel to the song called "Guilty Conscience 2". Unlike the original song, the sequel is a solo track and does not feature Dr. Dre, instead involving a battle between Eminem and his alter ego Slim Shady.

== Background ==
The concept for "Guilty Conscience" first arose whilst Dr. Dre and Eminem were at the gym together and discussing potential song ideas. Dr. Dre proposed a collaboration between the two called "Night 'n' Day", in which Dr. Dre would state various lyrics and Eminem would respond with the exact opposite sentiments. Eminem began writing the song upon returning home that evening. Mark Avery, an announcer from a talent agency, was hired to voice the narrator; after Eminem explained to Avery what he wanted him to say, the rest of the song was constructed around his parts.

The song contains a humorous reference to an occasion in which Dr. Dre assaulted Dee Barnes. Having only known Dr. Dre for a few days, Eminem was anxious about how he would react to such a line, and to his relief, Dr. Dre "fell out of his chair laughing" upon hearing the lyric.

The song contains a sample from the Ronald Stein song "Pigs Go Home" from the soundtrack to the film Getting Straight.

Eminem would later bring up the song in "The Way I Am", in which he raps: "And, 'Oh, it's his lyrical content / The song 'Guilty Conscience' has gotten such rotten responses".

== Critical reception ==
AllMusic highlighted this song on LP. Writing for Entertainment Weekly, David Browne noted that Eminem's "coldly-calculated-to-offend alter ego considers date rape".

== Music video ==
The video for "Guilty Conscience" has a nonstop back-beat with a chorus, unlike the album version, and a different narrator, played by actor Robert Culp. The lyrics in the chorus samples the song "I Will Follow Him" by Little Peggy March ("These voices, I hear them. And, when they talk, I'll follow"). The version that aired on MTV eliminated the murder at the end of the song and converted it into an escalating argument between Eminem and Dre with no resolution. In the Director's Cut, the part where the gunshots were heard is included.

The music video is produced using the bullet time technique, depicting Eminem and Dr. Dre rapping to the song's protagonists on how to deal with their conflicting situations: including a man's temptation to robbing a liquor store, a college student's urge to have sex with an underage girl at a frat party, and the urge of a construction worker to murder his wife after he catches her cheating with another man. Dr. Dre poses as the "good conscience" and wins the first arguments (Eddie) while Eminem poses as the "evil conscience" and wins the second (Stan). However, in the third argument, which is over the actions Grady (the construction worker) should take when he catches his wife cheating with another man, Eminem's taunting and accusations of hypocrisy coaxes Dr. Dre into agreeing with him that Grady should kill them both and subsequently Dre suggests that Grady should get his gun and murder his wife and her lover.

The nonstop back-beat and chorus from the music video were only used in the edited version of the song, but the narrator was not changed. The video won the "Hottest Music Video" award at the Online Hip-Hop Awards in 2000. The video was listed on MuchMusic's 50 Most Controversial Videos at No. 38 for its promotion on how people get crossed with their consciences.

== Lawsuit ==
In September 2003, 70-year-old widow Harlene Stein filed suit against Eminem and Dr. Dre on the grounds that "Guilty Conscience" contains an unauthorized sample of "Pigs Go Home" written for the film Getting Straight by her husband Ronald Stein, who died in 1988. Although the album's liner notes state that the song contains an interpolation of "Pigs Go Home", Stein is not credited as a co-writer and his wife was not paid royalties for use of the song. The lawsuit requested 5 percent of the retail list price of 90 percent of all copies of the album sold in America, and 2.5 percent of the retail price of 90 percent of all copies of the album sold internationally. The suit was dismissed in June 2004 for lack of subject matter jurisdiction.

== Awards and nominations ==
Year	Ceremony	Award	Result
1999	MTV Video Music Awards	Breakthrough Video	Nominated
2000	Grammy Awards	Best Rap Performance by a Duo or Group	Nominated

== Track listing ==
UK CD1

No.	Title	Writer(s)	Producer(s)	Length
1.	"Guilty Conscience" (radio edit) (extra clean with new hook)	Marshall Mathers; Andre Young	Dr. Dre; Eminem^{[a]}	3:16
2.	"Guilty Conscience" (album version) (with new hook)	Mathers; Young	Dr. Dre; Eminem^{[a]}	3:19
3.	"'97 Bonnie & Clyde"	Mathers; Jeffrey Bass; Mark Bass	Bass Brothers; Eminem^{[a]}	5:03
4.	"Guilty Conscience" (video)			3:19
Total length:				14:57

UK CD2

No.	Title	Writer(s)	Producer(s)	Length
1.	"Guilty Conscience" (radio edit) (extra clean with new hook)	Marshall Mathers; Andre Young	Dr. Dre; Eminem^{[a]}	3:16
2.	"Guilty Conscience" (instrumental)	Mathers; Young	Dr. Dre; Eminem^{[a]}	3:19
3.	"My Name Is" (clean version)	Mathers; Young; Labi Siffre	Dr. Dre	4:30
4.	"My Name Is" (video)			4:28
Total length:				15:33

UK Cassette

No.	Title	Writer(s)	Producer(s)	Length
1.	"Guilty Conscience" (radio edit) (extra clean with new hook)	Marshall Mathers; Andre Young	Dr. Dre; Eminem^{[a]}	3:16
2.	"Guilty Conscience" (instrumental)	Mathers; Young	Dr. Dre; Eminem^{[a]}	4:27
Total length:				6:35

German CD single

No.	Title	Writer(s)	Producer(s)	Length
1.	"Guilty Conscience" (radio edit) (extra clean with new hook)	Marshall Mathers; Andre Young	Dr. Dre; Eminem^{[a]}	3:16
2.	"Guilty Conscience" (instrumental)	Mathers; Young	Dr. Dre; Eminem^{[a]}	3:19
3.	"'97 Bonnie & Clyde"	Mathers; Jeffrey Bass; Mark Bass	Bass Brothers; Eminem^{[a]}	5:03
4.	"My Name Is" (clean version)	Mathers; Young; Labi Siffre	Dr. Dre	4:30
5.	"My Name Is" (video)			4:28
Total length:				20:36

Notes

- ^{^[a]} signifies a co-producer.

== Charts ==
=== Weekly charts ===
Weekly chart performance for "Guilty Conscience"
Chart (1999)	Peak position
Belgium (Ultratip Bubbling Under Flanders)	17
France (SNEP)	97
Germany (Media Control Charts)	40
Ireland (IRMA)	12
Netherlands (Dutch Top 40)	21
Netherlands (Single Top 100)	22
Sweden (Sverigetopplistan)	25
UK Singles (Official Charts)	5
UK Hip Hop/R&B (Official Charts)	1
US Hot R&B/Hip-Hop Songs (Billboard)	56

=== Year-end charts ===
1999 year-end chart performance for "Guilty Conscience"
Chart (1999)	Position
Netherlands (Dutch Top 40)	139
UK Singles (OCC)	119

== Certifications ==
Certifications and sales for "Guilty Conscience"
Region	Certification	Certified units/sales
Australia (ARIA)	Platinum	70,000^{‡}
New Zealand (RMNZ)	Gold	15,000^{‡}
United Kingdom (BPI)	Platinum	600,000^{‡}
United States (RIAA)	Platinum	1,000,000^{‡}
^{‡} Sales+streaming figures based on certification alone.
