= Trouble (Eminem song) =

2024 song by Eminem

Song by Eminem

from the album The Death of Slim Shady (Coup de Grâce)
- Released: July 12, 2024
- Genre: Hip hop
- Length: 0:41
- Label: Shady; Aftermath; Interscope
- Songwriters: Marshall Mathers III; Dwayne Abernathy Jr.; Farid Nassar
- Producers: Dem Jointz; Fredwreck

"Trouble" is a song by American rapper Eminem from his twelfth studio album The Death of Slim Shady (Coup de Grâce) (2024). It was produced by Dem Jointz and Fredwreck, the only song in the album not produced by Eminem.

== Composition ==
The song features a "wailing horror movie synth". Eminem, as his alter ego Slim Shady, opens his verse with the line "Fuck blind people" and takes shots at Generation Z.

== Critical reception ==
In his review of The Death of Slim Shady (Coup de Grâce), Simon K. of Sputnikmusic considered "Trouble" among the tracks that "ground the record where needed by stripping down to hard-hitting hip-hop simplicity."

== Charts ==
Chart performance for "Trouble"
| Chart (2024) | Peak position |
|---|---|
| Australia (ARIA) | 35 |
| Canada Hot 100 (Billboard) | 26 |
| Global 200 (Billboard) | 32 |
| New Zealand (Recorded Music NZ) | 23 |
| Portugal (AFP) | 114 |
| Sweden Heatseeker (Sverigetopplistan) | 2 |
| UK Hip Hop/R&B (Official Charts) | 7 |
| US Billboard Hot 100 | 31 |
| US Hot R&B/Hip-Hop Songs (Billboard) | 12 |
