= Habits (Eminem song) =

2024 song by Eminem

Song by Eminem featuring White Gold

from the album The Death of Slim Shady (Coup de Grâce)
- Released: July 12, 2024
- Genre: Hip hop
- Length: 4:58
- Label: Shady; Aftermath; Interscope
- Songwriters: Marshall Mathers III; Luis Resto; Bobby Yewah; L. Kråkm
- Producers: White Gold; Eminem; Narza

"Habits" is a song by American rapper Eminem from his twelfth studio album The Death of Slim Shady (Coup de Grâce) (2024). It features American singer White Gold and was produced by the performing artists along with Narza.

== Composition and lyrics ==
Over a beat with piano, the song revolves around Eminem battling the negative influence of his alter ego Slim Shady, referring to his impulses to treat dark and serious matters with humor in his lyrical content. It starts with a conversation between Eminem and Shady, in which the latter forces the former to take half of an Ativan. In the lyrics, Eminem attacks the current climate of political correctness and mentions Caitlyn Jenner before alluding to the people whom he has offended and related topics, such as both cisgender and transgender women, pronouns, "genderists", little people, "gingers" and censors. In addition, Eminem declares himself as "mom-shaming, dad-shaming, fat-shaming, mansplaining" and says that critics are "mad because they can't tame me". In the chorus, White Gold sings from the perspective of Shady, describing him as a drug that Eminem is addicted to.

== Critical reception ==
The song was met with generally positive reviews. Robin Murray of Clash wrote, "'Habits' deals with addiction, but it's all surface level; after a sombre opening it then switches into full Shady mode, taking down 'cry babies' and even – oddly – 'gingers'." Merlin Alderslade of Louder praised the production, stating it "create[s] a fraught and brooding atmosphere for Eminem to spit his frenetic bars over". Gabriel Bras Nevares of HotNewHipHop cited the "percussive speed-up" on the song as one of the particular highlights of the album. Fred Thomas of AllMusic commented the song "has the pop sparkle that took him from the underground to the radio".

== Charts ==
Chart performance for "Habits"
Chart (2024)	Peak position
Australia (ARIA)	17
Austria (Ö3 Austria Top 40)	59
Canada Hot 100 (Billboard)	13
Global 200 (Billboard)	16
Ireland (IRMA)	17
Netherlands (Single Top 100)	54
New Zealand (Recorded Music NZ)	14
Portugal (AFP)	61
South Africa (TOSAC)	20
Sweden (Sverigetopplistan)	68
Switzerland (Schweizer Hitparade)	24
UK Singles (OCC)	11
US Billboard Hot 100	19
US Hot R&B/Hip-Hop Songs (Billboard)	5

== Certifications ==
Region	Certification	Certified units/sales
Canada (Music Canada)	Gold	40,000^{‡}
^{‡} Sales+streaming figures based on certification alone.
