= Renaissance (Eminem song) =

2024 song by Eminem

Song by Eminem

from the album The Death of Slim Shady (Coup de Grâce)
- Released: July 12, 2024
- Recorded: 2005 & 2024
- Genre: Hip hop
- Length: 1:38
- Label: Shady; Aftermath; Interscope
- Songwriters: Marshall Mathers III; Luis Resto
- Producers: Eminem; Resto

"Renaissance" is a song by American rapper Eminem and the opening track from his twelfth studio album The Death of Slim Shady (Coup de Grâce) (2024). It was produced by Eminem himself and Luis Resto.

== Composition ==
The intro finds the sound of Eminem spitting (presumably) on a grave and has been open to interpretation among music critics regarding its meaning. Some critics believe it to be a reference to the Hawk Tuah Girl, while Dash Lewis of Pitchfork suggested "It could be Marshall Mathers trying to rid himself of the taste Slim Shady's words leave in his mouth. Or it could just be a warning shot: This is gonna be gross."

Lyrically, Eminem explores the minds of and condemns people who unfairly criticize the music of critically acclaimed rappers such as Kendrick Lamar and J. Cole on the internet. At one point, he compares himself to rapper Big Daddy Kane. The song also has Eminem's vocals heavily edited and tuned to make it sound like the rapper's voice from the 2000s. The first part of the verse was presumably a verse on the 2005 version of "Antichrist".

== Critical reception ==
The song received generally positive reviews. In a review of The Death of Slim Shady (Coup de Grâce), Robin Murray of Clash commented on the song, "The muscular flow and curious word play – 'shindigs' followed by 'gansta shit' anyone? – entertain, and it sets up the album well." Likewise, Consequence's Wren Graves stated the song "sets high expectations (soon disappointed), reflecting on the difficulty of making art." Steven J. Horowitz of Variety wrote the song "expertly toys with homophone in a critical tongue-lashing". Gabriel Bras Nevares of HotNewHipHop cited the "peppy and gritty beat" on the song as one of the particular highlights of the album. Dash Lewis remarked the song "functions mainly as a list of Eminem's bona fides" and praised it for using "lightly chuckle-worthy double entendres" such as "Soon as I quit giving a fuck I started to sell a bit", but wrote that "Near the end it devolves from a brash pen exercise to an attempt to shield himself from the criticism he can already feel coming." Paul Attard of Slant Magazine criticized the song for the reason that Eminem "treats his detractors in a similarly straw-man fashion, characterizing them as nebbish nitpickers who can't appreciate true art. 'You nerdy pricks would find somethin' wrong with 36 Chambers,' he sneers on 'Renaissance,' implying an objective standard for greatness that shouldn't be questioned."

== Charts ==
Chart performance for "Renaissance"
Chart (2024)	Peak position
Australia (ARIA)	18
Canada Hot 100 (Billboard)	14
Global 200 (Billboard)	18
Ireland (IRMA)	18
Netherlands (Single Top 100)	56
New Zealand (Recorded Music NZ)	15
Portugal (AFP)	70
South Africa (TOSAC)	25
Sweden (Sverigetopplistan)	72
Switzerland (Schweizer Hitparade)	23
UK Singles (OCC)	13
US Billboard Hot 100	20
US Hot R&B/Hip-Hop Songs (Billboard)	6

== Certifications ==
Region	Certification	Certified units/sales
Canada (Music Canada)	Gold	40,000^{‡}
^{‡} Sales+streaming figures based on certification alone.
