= Westside Boogie =

American rapper (born 1989)

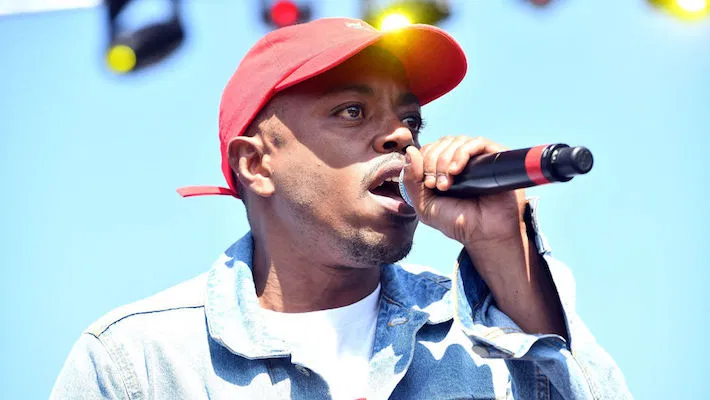
- Dixson in 2019

Background information
- Born: Anthony Tremaine Dixson; August 30, 1989 (age 37); Compton, California, U.S.
- Genre: Hip hop
- Occupations: Rapper; songwriter
- Instrument: Vocals
- Years active: 2013–present
- Labels: Shady; Interscope; LVRN
- Children: 1
- Website: www.westsideboogie.com

Anthony Tremaine Dixson (born August 30, 1989), known professionally as Westside Boogie (stylized in all capitals; formerly known as Boogie), is an American rapper. His debut mixtape, Thirst 48, was released on June 24, 2014, followed by his second, The Reach a year later. He signed a recording contract with Interscope Records in 2015, which entered a joint venture with Eminem's Shady Records two years later. His debut studio album, Everythings for Sale, was released on January 25, 2019. His second album, More Black Superheroes was released on June 17, 2022.

== Early life ==
Anthony Tremaine Dixson was born on August 30, 1989, in Compton, California, where he was also raised. He sang in his local church choir during his youth. Dixson became a father on June 24, 2009, with the birth of his son, Darius, which he has described as a turning point that motivated him to pursue music more seriously. In 2010, he enrolled in recording courses at Long Beach City College and used financial aid to purchase recording equipment. As a single father, he worked various part-time jobs before transitioning to music as a full-time career.

== Musical career ==
=== 2014–2016: Thirst 48, The Reach and Thirst 48, Pt. II ===
Boogie's musical career started when he joined the First Evergreen Missionary Baptist Church choir in 8th grade under the guidance of his mother. While a member of the choir, he was introduced to gangbanging and slowly began to make the transition from gospel to rap. On June 24, 2013, he released his debut mixtape Thirst 48, which chronicled his life and struggles. A year later, his debut was followed by his breakthrough mixtape The Reach, was released on June 24. He signed a deal with Interscope Records in 2015.

His break out single, "Oh My" was released in 2015 and produced by Jahlil Beats. In 2016, Boogie released Thirst 48, Pt. II via Interscope Records, a continuation of his debut mixtape from 2014 that also deals with new themes such as Millennial reliance on social media.

=== 2017–present: Everythings for Sale ===
In October 2017, Boogie signed to Shady Records. He appeared in the digital 2017 BET Hip-Hop Awards Detroit Cypher and featured behind Eminem during his solo freestyle.

His first release under Shady Records was the single "Violence", a collaboration with Masego, released in December 2017. In 2018, he released two additional singles: "Self Destruction" in May and "Deja Vu" in August.

Boogie has received praise from artists such as Rihanna, Eminem, and Kendrick Lamar.

He is managed by Love Renaissance (LVRN) and joined 6lack and Tierra Whack on 6lack's world tour in 2018.

Boogie's debut studio album, Everythings for Sale, was released on January 25, 2019. The project features the singles "Rainy Days", "Silent Ride", and "Self Destruction", and includes guest appearances from Eminem, 6lack, and JID, among others.

== Discography ==
=== Studio albums ===
Title	Album details	Peak chart positions			
Title	Album details	US	US R&B/HH	US Rap	CAN
Everythings for Sale	Released: January 25, 2019; Label: Shady, Interscope; Format: CD, LP, digital download, streaming	28	18	18	61
More Black Superheroes	Released: June 17, 2022; Label: Shady, Interscope; Format: CD, LP, digital download, streaming	—	—	—	—

=== Mixtapes ===
Title	Album details
Thirst 48	Released: June 24, 2014; Format: Digital download
The Reach	Released: June 24, 2015; Format: Digital download
Thirst 48, Pt. II	Released: October 14, 2016; Format: Digital download

=== Singles ===
List of singles as lead artist, with showing year released and album name
Title	Year	Album
"Bitter Raps"	2014	Thirst 48
"Oh My"	2015	The Reach
"No Way"	2016	Thirst 48, Pt. II
"Nigga Needs"	2016	Thirst 48, Pt. II
"Sunroof"	2017	Thirst 48, Pt. II
"Violence"	2017	Non-album singles
"Came Up"	2017	Non-album singles
"Deja Vu"	2018	Non-album singles
"Self Destruction"	2018	Everythings for Sale
"Silent Ride"	2019	Everythings for Sale
"Outside" (with Joey Badass)	2020	TBA
"Tripping" (with Malz Monday)	2021	Non-album singles
"Float" (featuring Mamii)	2021	Non-album singles
"Luxury" (with xBValentine)	2021	Non-album singles
"Aight" (with Shelley FKA DRAM)	2022	More Black Superheroes
"Stuck"	2022	More Black Superheroes

=== Guest appearances ===
List of non-single guest appearances, with other performing artists, showing year released and album name
Title	Year	Other artist(s)	Album
"City of God"	2016	Cozz	Nothin Personal
"Roped Off"	2016	The Game, Problem	Streets of Compton
"Today"	2016	Denzel Curry, Allan Kingdom	—N/a
"Monster 2.0"	2016	Jacob Banks	—N/a
"California (Remix)"	2017	Niia	I
"4 The Record"	2017	Buddy	Magnolia
"Bad Azz"	2017	DJ Quik, Problem, Dom Kennedy, Bad Lucc	Rosecrans: The Album
"Dumb"	2018	Royce da 5'9"	Book of Ryan
"When You Been"	2018	Cosmo's Midnight	What Comes Next
"I Was on the Block"	2019	YG, Valee	4Real 4Real
"Cliché"	2019	Wale, Ari Lennox	Wow... That's Crazy
"Bellin"	2020	Jay Worthy	—N/a
"Trapped In"	2020	Reason, Ab-Soul	—N/a
"Rapper Weed"	2020	Sir	—N/a
"Hairless Horsemen"	2020	Guapdad 4000	Platinum Falcon Returns
"Thoughts"	2020	Cassper Nyovest	A.M.N (Any Minute Now)
"Cue The Sun"	2020	Alycia Bella	—N/a
"Boxed In"	2020	Sainvil	2020 Was Hijacked
"Reign on Me"	2021	Curci	—N/a
"Flossin'"	2021	Lute	Gold Mouf
"Instincts"	2024	Erick the Architect	I've Never Been Here Before
"Fuel (Shady Edition)"	2024	Eminem, Grip	The Death of Slim Shady (Coup de Grâce): Expanded Mourner's Edition
"No Sleep"	2024	David Biga	—N/a
"Squish"	2026	The Frst, Devin Swank	—N/a
