= Stepping Stone (Eminem song) =

2018 song by Eminem

Song by Eminem

from the album Kamikaze
- Released: August 31, 2018
- Recorded: 2014–2018
- Genre: Hip hop
- Length: 5:09
- Label: Shady; Aftermath; Interscope
- Songwriters: Marshall Mathers; Luis Resto; Mario Resto
- Producers: Luis Resto; Eminem

"Stepping Stone" is a song by American rapper Eminem from his album Kamikaze (2018). It charted in Australia, Canada, Sweden, and the US.

== Background ==
"Stepping Stone" describes the fallout of D12, a rap group of which Eminem was formerly a member. He also uses the song to confirm his retirement from the group after many years of inactive membership following the death of fellow member Proof in 2006.

== Critical reception ==
In a review of Kamikaze for The Guardian, Alexis Petridis referred to "Stepping Stone" as "a thoughtful examination of the collapse of [Eminem's] group D12". Trent Clark of HipHopDX likewise noted "ruminative wordplay". Reviewing the album for Pitchfork, Marc Hogan deemed the song "a maudlin tribute to [Eminem's] former group D12".

== Personnel ==
- Eminem – lead vocals, production
- Luis Resto – additional production, keyboards
- Mario Resto – additional vocals

== Charts ==
Chart (2018)	Peak position
Australia (ARIA)	34
Canada Hot 100 (Billboard)	30
Sweden (Sverigetopplistan)	52
US Billboard Hot 100	42

== Certifications ==
Certifications for "Stepping Stone"
Region	Certification	Certified units/sales
Australia (ARIA)	Gold	35,000^{‡}
^{‡} Sales+streaming figures based on certification alone.
