= Fuel (JID and Eminem song) =

2024 song by Eminem and JID

- 7-inch vinyl artwork

Song by Eminem and JID

from the album The Death of Slim Shady (Coup de Grâce)
- Released: July 12, 2024
- Recorded: 2021–2024
- Genre: Hip-hop; trap
- Length: 3:33
- Label: Shady; Aftermath; Interscope
- Songwriters: Marshall Mathers III; Luis Resto; Denaun Porter; Harrison Le Mon Bey; Thomas Forbes; Destin Route
- Producers: Mr. Porter; Eminem

Lyric video
- "Fuel" on YouTube

"Fuel (Shady Edition)"

Promotional single by Eminem, Westside Boogie and Grip

from the album The Death of Slim Shady (Coup de Grâce): Expanded Mourner's Edition
- Released: September 13, 2024
- Genre: Hip-hop; trap
- Length: 4:51
- Label: Shady; Aftermath; Interscope
- Songwriters: Marshall Mathers III; Destin Route; Denaun Porter; Luis Resto; Thomas Forbes; Harrison Le Mon Bey; Anthony Dixson; Kyle Clow
- Producers: Mr. Porter; Eminem

"Fuel" is a song by American rappers Eminem and JID, released as a track from the former's twelfth studio album The Death of Slim Shady (Coup de Grâce) on July 12, 2024. It was produced by Eminem alongside Mr. Porter. The official lyric video was released on November 18.

A remix of the song, featuring fellow American rappers and Shady Records signees Westside Boogie and Grip, as well as a new verse from Eminem, was released on September 13, 2024, as part of the album's Expanded Mourner's deluxe edition. The remix, subtitled "Shady Edition", was later released as a promotional single.

It was released as a vinyl single on May 22, 2025, by Interscope, after being delayed from February 7, containing both the original song and the Shady Edition remix.

== Composition and lyrics ==
The song contains trap production with 808s and piano, over which the rappers perform in rapid-fire delivery. Eminem takes aim at rapper P. Diddy in the lyrics, referring to his sexual assault allegations ("I'm like a R-A-P-E-R (Yeah) / Got so many Ese’s (Ese’s), S-As (Huh) / Wait, he didn't just spell the word, 'Rapper' and leave out a P, did he? (Yep)") and alleged involvement in the murders of rappers The Notorious B.I.G. and Tupac Shakur. In addition, he references Kyle Rittenhouse by name and the related Kenosha unrest shooting as well as actor Alec Baldwin fatally shooting cinematographer Halyna Hutchins by accident on the set of the film Rust.

== Critical reception ==
The song received generally positive reviews. Zachary Horvath of HotNewHipHop wrote "It seems the hate gives Eminem extra juice to unleash on any competitor that tries to step to him, and its why naming this song 'Fuel' is such a W. However, what also makes this track fun is that Eminem is playing the role of the instigator. He is coming for Diddy's neck and does so in a clever manner." He additionally noted the song "combines wit and humor to the nth degree". Louder's Merlin Alderslade praised the production, stating it "create[s] a fraught and brooding atmosphere for Eminem to spit his frenetic bars over". Jordan Bassett of NME commented the song's "Diddy gag should take its place in the pantheon of his greatest disses." HotNewHipHop's Gabriel Bras Nevares considered it the best song from The Death of Slim Shady (Coup de Grâce), "thanks to two killer verses from Eminem and JID."

Karan Singh of HipHopDX responded negatively to the song for the reason that Eminem "acts on his decades-old urge to make light of rape while literally spelling out how clever he thinks he is". Some critics were more favorable toward JID's performance than that of Eminem; Rob Sheffield of Rolling Stone commented "JID excels on the otherwise flaccid 'Fuel'", and Dash Lewis of Pitchfork wrote "Though he deflates 'Fuel' with an overlong, technique-heavy tirade, Em enlists JID, one of his stylistic descendants, for a breathtaking verse."

== Track listing ==
7" vinyl

Side A
| No. | Title | Writer(s) | Producer(s) | Length |
|---|---|---|---|---|
| 1. | "Fuel" (with JID) | Marshall Mathers III; Luis Resto; Denaun Porter; Harrison Le Mon Bey; Thomas Forbes; Destin Route | Mr. Porter; Eminem^{[a]} | 3:33 |

Side B
| No. | Title | Writer(s) | Producer(s) | Length |
|---|---|---|---|---|
| 1. | "Fuel (Shady Edition)" (with Westside Boogie and Grip) | Mathers; Route; Porter; Resto; Forbes; Le Mon Bey; Anthony Dixson; Kyle Clow | Mr. Porter; Eminem^{[a]} | 4:53 |

- ^{^[a]} signifies an additional producer

== Charts ==
=== Weekly charts ===
Weekly chart performance for "Fuel"
| Chart (2024) | Peak position |
|---|---|
| Australia (ARIA) | 28 |
| Canada Hot 100 (Billboard) | 24 |
| Global 200 (Billboard) | 26 |
| New Zealand (Recorded Music NZ) | 19 |
| Portugal (AFP) | 106 |
| Sweden Heatseeker (Sverigetopplistan) | 7 |
| UK Singles (Official Charts) | 78 |
| UK Hip Hop/R&B (Official Charts) | 11 |
| US Billboard Hot 100 | 21 |
| US Hot R&B/Hip-Hop Songs (Billboard) | 7 |

=== Year-end charts ===
2024 year-end chart performance for "Fuel"
| Chart (2024) | Position |
|---|---|
| US Hot R&B/Hip-Hop Songs (Billboard) | 91 |

== Certifications ==
| Region | Certification | Certified units/sales |
|---|---|---|
| New Zealand (RMNZ) | Gold | 15,000^{‡} |
^{‡} Sales+streaming figures based on certification alone.
