= Brand New Dance (song) =

Song by Eminem

from the album The Death of Slim Shady (Coup de Grâce)
- Released: July 12, 2024
- Recorded: July 2004; 2024
- Genre: Comedy hip hop
- Length: 3:26
- Songwriters: Marshall Mathers III; Luis Resto
- Producers: Eminem; Luis Resto

"Brand New Dance" is a song by American rapper Eminem. It was released through Shady Records, Aftermath Entertainment, and Interscope Records as the fourth track from his twelfth studio album, The Death of Slim Shady (Coup de Grâce), on July 12, 2024. The song was written and produced by Eminem himself, with co-production credited to Luis Resto. The song, originally titled "Christopher Reeves", and incorrectly named after the Superman actor Christopher Reeve, was intended to feature on Eminem's fifth studio album, Encore, in 2004, but was shelved due to Reeve's recent death. In January 2025, the original "Christopher Reeves" version leaked online, alongside several other unreleased Eminem songs. Together, these songs were packaged as the third installment of the bootleg series, Straight from the Lab.

== Background ==
Originally, the song was recorded to be as the seventh track off Eminem's fifth studio album, Encore, under the name "Christopher Reeves". However, the song was cut after its main subject, film actor Christopher Reeve, died on October 10, 2004, from heart failure, a month before the album's release. This was revealed on Eminem's song "Guilty Conscience 2", with the lyrics "And I know that Chris Reeves song was recorded in 2004 for Encore / Fuck'd you take it off for? / 'Cause he died / Man, that motherfucker did that bullshit on purpose to ruin the song for us."

On July 12, 2024, the song was released on Eminem's twelfth studio album The Death of Slim Shady (Coup de Grâce), under the name "Brand New Dance". The bridge, outro and names Kim Jong-Un and Caitlyn Jenner (replacing Saddam and Brittany Murphy) was recorded during the making of the album.

In a comedic interview titled "Slim Shady vs. Marshall Mathers: THE FACE-OFF" which released on July 30, 2024, Mathers asks his alter-ego "Also, what's your fucking weird obsession with Christopher Reeve?" Slim Shady responds "Christopher Reeves was Superman, what are you talking about? I'm tryna pay homage. It's funny, 'cause he was fucking Superman, he fell off a horse."

== Critical reception ==
The song was met with generally negative reviews from critics. Ben Devlin of MusicOMH wrote "It certainly sounds like a reject from one of Eminem's worst albums [Encore], emphasizing the backward-looking, tedious approach of this record, and the song has no cultural relevance decades after Reeve's life-changing accident." Jordan Bassett of NME wrote in a review of The Death of Slim Shady (Coup de Grâce), "The production is appealingly cartoonish and rubbery, from the elastic bassline that twangs through 'Brand New Dance'..." Rob Sheffield of Rolling Stone wrote, "But it's fair to say that nobody, not even his worst enemies, would have predicted that two decades later, he'd still be making Christopher Reeve jokes—in fact, he'd devote an entire song to repeating the same joke that once took him three seconds. "Brand New Dance" is sad enough in itself..."

Dash Lewis of Pitchfork praised the song, writing "Despite its dated, unnecessary content, "Brand New Dance" might be the best song on [The Death of Slim Shady (Coup de Grâce)]."

== Charts ==
Chart performance for "Brand New Dance"
Chart (2024)	Peak position
Australia (ARIA)	21
Canada Hot 100 (Billboard)	17
Global 200 (Billboard)	24
Ireland (IRMA)	61
New Zealand (Recorded Music NZ)	18
Portugal (AFP)	85
Sweden (Sverigetopplistan)	92
UK Hip Hop/R&B (OCC)	5
US Billboard Hot 100	25
US Hot R&B/Hip-Hop Songs (Billboard)	10

== Certifications ==
Region	Certification	Certified units/sales
Canada (Music Canada)	Gold	40,000^{‡}
^{‡} Sales+streaming figures based on certification alone.
