= Antichrist (song) =

2024 song by Eminem

Song by Eminem

from the album The Death of Slim Shady (Coup de Grâce)
- Released: July 12, 2024
- Genre: Hip-hop
- Length: 5:14
- Label: Shady; Aftermath; Interscope
- Songwriters: Marshall Mathers III; Rufus Johnson; Luis Resto; Shane Webb
- Producers: Eminem; Resto; Foulmouth

"Antichrist" is a song by American rapper Eminem from his twelfth studio album The Death of Slim Shady (Coup de Grâce) (2024). It was produced Eminem himself, Luis Resto and Foulmouth. The song features additional vocals by fellow Detroit rapper Bizarre, a former member of Eminem's former rap group, D12.

== Content ==
Overall, the song finds Eminem's alter ego, Slim Shady, lambasting political correctness, particularly attacking Generation Z and the surrounding "woke" cultural climate, saying he wishes for society to return to its ways in 2003. He also addresses the controversies related to his music ("Who else is as pitiless, actually witty and crass / Hideous, ghastly and insidious as me?"). In the second verse, he references the video of Diddy physically assaulting his former partner Cassie Ventura in a hotel hallway in 2016 (although censoring Cassie's name), threatening to hurt his critics in the same manner.

In 2025, an earlier version of "Antichrist" leaked online, which features alternate lyrics targeting Michael Jackson. This version is included as the third part of Straight from the Lab.

== Critical reception ==
The song received generally positive reviews from critics, with Eminem's wordplay, humor and use of homophones in particular being praised.

Karan Singh of HipHopDX deemed the lyrics that refer to Diddy to be one of the "celebrity references made in poor taste" on The Death of Slim Shady (Coup de Grâce). Gabriel Bras Nevares of HotNewHipHop described the rhyme schemes on the song as among the "Comically crude, wildly impressive, and deep moments" in the album. Sy Shackleford of RapReviews commented the song "has a playful beat and shows Em's mastery of wordplay, homophones, and flow, particularly on the third verse".

== Charts ==
Chart performance for "Antichrist"
Chart (2024)	Peak position
Australia (ARIA)	38
Canada Hot 100 (Billboard)	30
Global 200 (Billboard)	43
New Zealand (Recorded Music NZ)	26
Portugal (AFP)	148
Sweden Heatseeker (Sverigetopplistan)	17
UK Hip Hop/R&B (Official Charts)	13
US Billboard Hot 100	39
US Hot R&B/Hip-Hop Songs (Billboard)	15
