= Lucifer (Eminem and Sly Pyper song) =

2024 song by Eminem and Sly Pyper

Song by Eminem and Sly Pyper

from the album The Death of Slim Shady (Coup de Grâce)
- Released: July 12, 2024
- Recorded: 2020 or 2021-2024
- Genre: Hip hop
- Length: 4:21
- Label: Shady; Aftermath; Interscope
- Songwriters: Marshall Mathers III; Sly Jordan; Thomas Cheval; Andre Young; Andres Holten; Hans van Hemert; Luis Resto
- Producers: Callus; Dr. Dre; Eminem

"Lucifer" is a song by American rapper Eminem and American singer Sly Pyper from the former's twelfth studio album The Death of Slim Shady (Coup de Grâce) (2024). It was produced by Callus, Dr. Dre and Eminem himself.

== Background ==
Between 2020 and 2021, around after his brain aneurysm, Dr. Dre recorded this song called “Bye Bye” (later retitled as “Lucifer”) which was about his ex wife (Nicole) on the GTA Online studio session alongside with “Greedy Bitch”, both about the divorce. Which didn’t make it in GTA Online.

== Composition ==
The song uses a sample of the song "Land of Milk and Honey" which is on the B-side of the single How Do You Do by the Dutch band Mouth and MacNeal.

"Lucifer" opens with a spoken word sample, in which a voice is heard saying "The 'coup de grâce' is the final shot right between the eyes." Over a bouzouki-sampling, "stark and Wild Wild West-esque" beat, Eminem details his family upbringing, addresses the hypocrisies of Candace Owens and much of the criticism aimed at him, and references the Columbine High School massacre and the Depp v. Heard trial. Furthermore, he suggests that people would be in a more advantageous position if they feuded with rapper Kendrick Lamar instead of him (alluding to Lamar's feud with fellow rapper Drake) and criticizes the undesirable effects of political correctness in the current generation on his music. The song also features a "soulful and slightly bluesy" chorus sung by Sly Pyper.

== Critical reception ==
The song was well-received by music critics. In a review of The Death of Slim Shady (Coup de Grâce), Alexis Petridis of The Guardian believed the song "has a strong claim to be the album's strongest track." Simon K. of Sputnikmusic stated the song "has this devil-may-care vibe to it, with a sashaying rhythm, jangly guitar part and this gospel undertone which adds flavour". Clash's Robin Murray considered the song one of the "few truly effective haymakers" from the album, writing that the "eerie throw-back production" and intro "recalls Wu-Tang at their most ferocious". Variety's Steven J. Horowitz commented "You can marvel at the lyrical aptitude conveyed on the Dr. Dre co-produced 'Lucifer,' one of the record's best, or bristle at its dated reference to Amber Heard and Johnny Depp's relationship. Or both." Gabriel Bras Nevares of HotNewHipHop cited the "can of Coke" line, the rhyme scheme used in the lyrics targeting Candace Owens and the lyrics concerning Kendrick Lamar to be among the "hilarious, impressive, or exciting moments" of the song. Peter A. Berry of Spin remarked "His 'Candace O' jabs on 'Lucifer' are nearly as quippy and flawlessly rhymed as the bars he traded with Jay-Z back on 'Renegade.'"

In a ranking of every song on the album excluding skits, Billboard magazine's Michael Saponara placed Lucifer last, comparing its intro to that of "Square Dance" from The Eminem Show and highlighting the lyrics responding to Candace Owens, as well writing: "Dr. Dre is here and his Midas touch is noticeable on the crisp jingle."

== Charts ==
Chart performance for "Lucifer"
Chart (2024)	Peak position
Australia (ARIA)	36
Canada Hot 100 (Billboard)	29
Global 200 (Billboard)	40
New Zealand (Recorded Music NZ)	20
Portugal (AFP)	131
Sweden Heatseeker (Sverigetopplistan)	8
UK Hip Hop/R&B (OCC)	9
US Billboard Hot 100	37
US Hot R&B/Hip-Hop Songs (Billboard)	14
