= Temporary (song) =

2024 song by Eminem and Skylar Grey

Song by Eminem featuring Skylar Grey

from the album The Death of Slim Shady (Coup de Grâce)
- Released: July 12, 2024
- Genre: Conscious hip hop
- Length: 4:57
- Label: Shady; Aftermath; Interscope
- Songwriters: Marshall Mathers III; Holly Hafermann; Luis Resto
- Producers: Skylar Grey; Eminem

Music video
- "Temporary" on YouTube

"Temporary" is a song by American rapper Eminem featuring American singer Skylar Grey from the former's twelfth studio album The Death of Slim Shady (Coup de Grâce) (2024). It was produced by the lead artists. A music video for the track was released on October 3, 2024.

== Composition ==
"Temporary" is an ode to Eminem's daughter Hailie. It also features archival audio of her as a baby. Over a piano-driven instrumental, Eminem says the song is intended for Hailie to listen to when he dies and remember his love for her, before telling her to look after her siblings and uncle after his death. He also admits the song is "the hardest thing I ever wrote". The chorus, as well as the first verse, are sung by Skylar Grey.

== Music video ==
On October 3, 2024, a music video promoting Temporary was released on Eminem's official YouTube channel. The music video alternates between old late-1990s to early-2000s home video footage of Hailie and her father Eminem, and new video footage from more recent years when Hailie tells him about her pregnancy.

Like "Framed", a track song from Revival (2017), the song was never considered a single, but has received a music video.

== Critical reception ==
Steven J. Horowitz of Variety described the song as "Eminem at his best", while Jordan Bassett of NME called it "a genuinely moving ode to his daughter, Hailie, which proves Marshall Mathers can say something that matters when he wants to." Merlin Alderslade of Louder commented the song "is heartfelt and well executed but feels out of place." Simon K. of Sputnikmusic named it as one of the particular songs from The Death of Slim Shady (Coup de Grâce) whose "instrumentals retain issues I've had with Eminem's works for decades now". Stevie Chick of The Independent described the song as having a "gloomy, somewhat mawkish thread". Paul Attard of Slant Magazine regarded the song to be among the album's "overblown ballads dedicated to his family".

== Charts ==
Chart performance for "Temporary"
Chart (2024)	Peak position
Australia (ARIA)	49
Canada Hot 100 (Billboard)	36
Global 200 (Billboard)	67
New Zealand (Recorded Music NZ)	33
UK Singles Downloads (Official Charts)	41
US Billboard Hot 100	56
