= The Death of Slim Shady (Coup de Grâce) =

2024 album by Eminem

- Standard edition artwork

Studio album by Eminem
- Released: July 12, 2024
- Recorded: 2004–2005 (Note: The album's fourth track, "Brand New Dance", was recorded in 2004, and was originally meant to be released on Encore.); 2021–2024
- Genre: Hip-hop
- Length: 64:39
- Labels: Shady; Goliath; Aftermath; Interscope
- Producers: Cole Bennett; Benny Blanco; Callus; Car!ton; Don Cannon; Cubeatz; Daniyel; Dem Jointz; Dr. Dre; Emile; Eminem; Foul Mouth; Fredwreck; Jameil Aossey; Marvy Ayy; John Nocito; Mr. Porter; Luis Resto; Skylar Grey; White Gold

Eminem chronology
Curtain Call 2 (2022)	The Death of Slim Shady (Coup de Grâce) (2024)	Stans: The Official Soundtrack (2025)

Alternative cover
- Expanded Mourner's edition artwork

Singles from The Death of Slim Shady (Coup de Grâce)
- 1. "Houdini" Released: May 31, 2024; 2. "Tobey" Released: July 2, 2024; 3. "Somebody Save Me" Released: July 19, 2024

The Death of Slim Shady (Coup de Grâce) (Note: Coup de grâce (/kuː də ɡrɑːs/) is a French-originated term translating to "blow of mercy"; a death blow to a severely wounded being.) is the twelfth studio album by the American rapper Eminem. It was released through Shady Records, Goliath Artists, Aftermath Entertainment, and Interscope Records on July 12, 2024. The concept album centers around a battle between Eminem himself and his Slim Shady alter ego. The album incorporates hardcore hip-hop, satirical hip-hop, and conscious hip-hop. The album features guest appearances from White Gold, Sly Pyper, Bizarre, JID, Dem Jointz, Ez Mil, Skylar Grey, Big Sean, BabyTron, and Jelly Roll; the Expanded Mourner's Edition additionally features 2 Chainz, Westside Boogie, and Grip.

Production on the album was primarily handled by Eminem, alongside Dem Jointz, Fredwreck, Cubeatz, and Cole Bennett, as well as frequent collaborators Dr. Dre, Mr. Porter, and Luis Resto, among others. It follows his 2020 album, Music to Be Murdered By. The album was promoted by three singles: "Houdini", "Tobey", and "Somebody Save Me"; an additional music video was made for "Temporary", as well as a lyric video for "Fuel".

The Death of Slim Shady topped the charts in numerous countries, including the United Kingdom and the United States. The album was met with generally mixed reviews from critics, though praise was directed towards Eminem's rapping techniques. It became Eminem's eighth nomination for the Grammy Award for Best Rap Album and won Favorite Hip Hop Album at the 2025 American Music Awards.

== Background ==
Eminem referenced his alter ego, Slim Shady, in songs like "My Name Is" (1999) and "The Real Slim Shady" (2000). The image of Slim Shady is synonymous with how Eminem appeared as a young man on stage and in videos, including his bleached blonde hair. The provocative persona was described by Time as a "nightmare projection" and "raging fantasy id" in 2002. On March 19, 2024, long-time producer and collaborator Dr. Dre revealed on Jimmy Kimmel Live! that Eminem was working on his next studio album and that it would be releasing in 2024. During the 2024's NFL draft event in his hometown Detroit on April 26, he shared a video in the style of real crime show, Unsolved Mysteries, posed as a question of "Who killed Slim Shady?" A reporter dressed in a trenchcoat lists the enemies Shady has made over the years, with rapper 50 Cent commenting on the persona. The teaser also incorporated clips of "My Name Is", "The Real Slim Shady", and "Without Me" (2002). The album and tentative release date were announced at the end of the 56-second long video, along with the opportunity to pre-save the record. The fake obituary for Slim Shady appeared in the May 13 issue of the Detroit Free Press newspaper as promotion for the album. Eminem is pictured in overalls and a hockey mask as his Slim Shady persona, while the obituary reads, "Ultimately, the very things that seemed to be the tools he used became calling cards that defined an existence that could only come to a sudden and horrific end. His complex and tortured existence has come to a close, and the legacy he leaves behind is no closer to resolution than the manner in which this character departed this world."

On May 21, Eminem made a cryptic post to his social media, containing a video with an iMessage chat addressed to "All Contacts" with the message "...and for my last trick!" Eminem changed his social media profile pictures to match the rabbit-in-a-top-hat emoji used in the post. Following the post, fans took to social media to express their concerns and theories about Eminem's potential retirement. On July 9, Eminem revealed the album cover on his social media pages before releasing the album three days later. On July 11, Eminem posted a "public service announcement" on Twitter that the album is "conceptual", and advised fans to listen to the songs in order.

On September 10, Eminem posted a teaser trailer on social media for a deluxe edition of the album, titled Expanded Mourner's Edition, released on Friday the 13th of the same month. The expanded edition contains three tracks that were previously released as bonuses for pre-ordering exclusive digital versions of the album, as well as a fourth unheard track titled "Fuel (Shady Edition)" - a remix of "Fuel" featuring Shady Records signees Westside Boogie and Grip, bringing the version of the album to a total of 23 tracks.

== Singles ==
On May 28, 2024, Eminem posted a joint video with magician David Blaine. The video shows a FaceTime between Eminem and Blaine, with the former asking for help and a magic trick to which the latter responds by eating a glass of wine. He then previews the track, called "Houdini", by playing a short instrumental snippet. At the end of the clip, the song title and release date are revealed. It was released as the lead single on May 31, along with an accompanying music video. The single was a commercial success, reaching the number one spot in twelve countries and on the Global 200.

On June 28, Eminem posted a teaser for the album's second single, titled "Tobey", a collaboration with fellow American rappers Big Sean and BabyTron. The short black-and-white clip depicts Eminem wearing a Jason mask and wielding a chainsaw, while standing next to the featured artists, with an instrumental snippet playing in the background. The song was released on July 2. A Lyrical Lemonade music video for the track was released on July 8, following a 3-day delay due to its unfinished production.

On July 19, a week after the album was released, "Somebody Save Me", a collaboration with American singer Jelly Roll, was released on streaming services as the third single. An accompanying music video was released on August 21.

== Critical reception ==
Professional ratings
Aggregate scores
Source	Rating
AnyDecentMusic?	4.8/10
Metacritic	46/100
Review scores
Source	Rating
AllMusic	1.5/5 stars
And It Don't Stop	A
The Daily Telegraph	4/5 stars
The Guardian	3/5 stars
The Independent	2/5 stars
Louder	2.5/5 stars
NME	3/5 stars
Pitchfork	4.8/10
Rolling Stone	2/5 stars
Sputnikmusic	3.7/5

According to the review aggregator Metacritic, The Death of Slim Shady (Coup de Grâce) received "mixed or average reviews" based on a weighted average score of 46 out of 100 from 16 critic scores.

Detroit Free Press gave the album a positive review by saying "The production is tight, the wordplay dependably clever, the vocal flow confident and versatile." At the same time adding that the album is in the same league as his previous albums The Eminem Show, and Encore, the latter being literally as the track "Brand New Dance" was largely recorded in 2004. Complex stated that the album was "just vintage Slim Shady shit". Billboard stated that the best track on the album was "Somebody Save Me", calling it a "teary-eyed end to the Slim Shady journey".

Clash stated that "The Death of Slim Shady (Coup de Grace) doesn't quite feel like an ending, but neither does it feel like a continuation", and later stated that it features some of Eminem's best rapping in decades. Meanwhile, The Independent gave the album two out of five stars, stating that "if [it] was conceived to let Mathers have his cake and eat it – to indulge his earlier, purposefully offensive wordplay under the guise of struggling against the Shady persona within – the reality is the worst of both worlds."

In a review for Cult MTL, Mr. Wavvy called The Death of Slim Shady (Coup de Grace) Eminem's "strongest album in over a decade, which may say more about his abundance of misfires since The Marshall Mathers LP2 than it does about the quality of this body of songs." Writing for The Daily Telegraph, Neil McCormick described the album as "funny, shocking, contradictory, utterly outrageous, offensive, sentimental, clever, dumb and occasionally even (whisper it) wise". Rolling Stone concluded "He's still young—barely into his fifties—but he takes a bizarre amount of pride in clinging to opinions he formed in his teens, and making those his whole point. Still blaming his problems on women, scared of trans folks, enraged by the idea of weird people doing weird shit, still moaning about his mom? He begs to get canceled by audiences who don't think about him and have no idea he thinks about them."

In a July 2024 ranking of Eminem's 12 studio albums, Damien Scott of Billboard magazine placed The Death of Slim Shady (Coup de Grace) sixth, referring to the project as "the most Slim Shady album since Relapse". Scott highlighted the tracks "Houdini", "Brand New Dance", and "Guilty Conscience 2", as well as Eminem's collaborations with JID, Big Sean, and BabyTron, concluding: "The Death of Slim Shady feels like the album Eminem's been trying to make since Recovery. Now that he's finally knocked it out, it's exciting to think about what he does next."

== Commercial performance ==
In the United States, the album debuted at number one on the Billboard 200 chart, accumulating 281,000 album equivalent units which consisted of 114,000 downloads and 164,500 streaming-equivalent units. This gave Eminem his eleventh album to top the chart, tying him with Barbra Streisand, Kanye West, and Bruce Springsteen for the fifth highest number of albums to reach the summit. The Death of Slim Shady (Coup de Grâce) is the fastest selling rap album of 2024, and has the second-highest digital sales week behind Taylor Swift's The Tortured Poets Department. It would also unseat The Tortured Poets Department, which had held the chart's top spot for twelve weeks.

Following the release of physical copies and the Expanded Mourner's deluxe edition of the album, it bounced back from number forty-two to number seven on Billboard 200, selling over 48,000 units including 24,000 pure sales. On the week of November 9, 2024, the album surged from number forty-four to number six after its vinyl release, selling over 49,000 units with 31,000 being pure sales, becoming Eminem's best week ever on vinyl. According to the Hits daily double magazine, The album has moved a total of 999,000 album-equivalent units by the end of 2024, including 236,000 pure album sales, 190,000 song sales, 927 million audio-on-demand streams, and 108 million video-on-demand streams.

The Death of Slim Shady (Coup de Grâce) also opened atop the UK Albums Chart with 45,000 chart units and became his eleventh album to take the number one spot. It stayed at the top for three consecutive weeks. The album debuted at number one in an additional fourteen countries, including Australia, New Zealand, the Netherlands and Switzerland.

== Track listing ==
Standard edition
No.	Title	Writer(s)	Producer(s)	Length
1.	"Renaissance"	Marshall Mathers III; Luis Resto	Eminem; Resto^{[a]}	1:38
2.	"Habits" (featuring White Gold)	Mathers; Bobby Yewah; Resto; L. Kråkm	White Gold; Eminem^{[a]}; Narza^{[b]}	4:58
3.	"Trouble"	Mathers; Dwayne Abernathy, Jr.; Farid Nassar	Dem Jointz; Fredwreck	0:41
4.	"Brand New Dance"	Mathers; Resto	Eminem; Resto^{[a]}	3:26
5.	"Evil"	Mathers; Donald Cannon; Tim Gomringer; Kevin Gomringer; Resto	Don Cannon; Cubeatz; Eminem^{[a]}	3:50
6.	"All You Got" (skit)	Mathers; Resto	Eminem	0:24
7.	"Lucifer" (featuring Sly Pyper)	Mathers; Sly Jordan; Thomas Cheval; Andre Young; Andres Holten; Hans van Hemert; Resto	Callus; Dr. Dre; Eminem^{[a]}	4:21
8.	"Antichrist"	Mathers; Resto; Shane Webb; Rufus Johnson	Eminem; Resto^{[a]}; Foul Mouth^{[b]}	5:14
9.	"Fuel" (featuring JID)	Mathers; Destin Route; Denaun Porter; Resto; Thomas Forbes; Harrison Le Mon Bey	Mr. Porter; Eminem^{[b]}	3:33
10.	"Road Rage" (featuring Dem Jointz and Sly Pyper)	Mathers; Abernathy, Jr.; S. Jordan; Young; Resto; Terius Gray; Byron Thomas	Dem Jointz; Dr. Dre; Eminem^{[b]}	3:37
11.	"Houdini"	Mathers; Resto; Steve Miller; Jeff Bass; Kevin Bell; Anne Dudley; Trevor Horn; Malcolm McLaren	Eminem; Resto^{[b]}	3:47
12.	"Breaking News" (skit)	Mathers; Resto	Eminem	0:37
13.	"Guilty Conscience 2"	Mathers; Abernathy, Jr.; Nassar; Resto	Eminem; Dem Jointz; Fredwreck	5:25
14.	"Head Honcho" (featuring Ez Mil)	Mathers; Jameil Aossey; Ezekiel Miller; Resto	Eminem; Ez Mil^{[b]}; Jameil Aossey^{[b]}; Resto^{[b]}	3:54
15.	"Temporary" (featuring Skylar Grey)	Mathers; Holly Hafermann; Resto	Skylar Grey; Eminem^{[a]}	4:57
16.	"Bad One" (featuring White Gold)	Mathers; Yewah; Resto	Eminem; Resto^{[b]}	4:30
17.	"Tobey" (featuring BabyTron and Big Sean)	Mathers; James Johnson IV; Sean Anderson; Cole Bennett; Carlton McDowell; Daniyel Weissmann; John Nocito; Marvin Jordan; Julian Harris; Tom Kahre; Resto	Bennett; Carlton; Daniyel; Nocito; Marvy Ayy; Eminem^{[b]}	4:44
18.	"Guess Who's Back" (skit)	Mathers	Eminem	1:02
19.	"Somebody Save Me" (featuring Jelly Roll)	Mathers; Jason DeFord; Benjamin Levin; Emile Haynie; Resto; David Stevens	Benny Blanco; Emile; Eminem^{[b]}	3:50
Total length:				64:39

Expanded Mourner's edition
No.	Title	Writer(s)	Producer(s)	Length
20.	"Steve Berman" (skit)	Mathers	Eminem	0:25
21.	"Fuel (Shady Edition)" (featuring Westside Boogie and Grip)	Mathers; Route; Porter; Resto; Forbes; Le Mon Bey; Anthony Dixson; Kyle Clow	Mr. Porter; Eminem^{[b]}	4:53
22.	"Like My Shit"	Mathers; Andre Powell; David Doman	Eminem; D.A. Got That Dope	3:49
23.	"Kyrie & Luka" (featuring 2 Chainz)	Mathers; Resto; Tauheed Epps; Louis Barrier; William Griffin	2 Chainz; Eminem	4:13
Total length:				77:48

=== Notes ===
- ^{^[a]} signifies a co-producer
- ^{^[b]} signifies an additional producer

=== Sample credits ===
- "Habits" contains excerpts from the South Park episode "Safe Space", spoken by Alex Ruiz.
- "Lucifer" contains a sample from "Land of Milk and Honey", written by Andres Holten and Hans van Hemert, as performed by Mouth and MacNeal.
- "Road Rage" contains interpolations from "Ha", written by Terius Gray and Byron Thomas, as performed by Juvenile.
- "Houdini" contains a sample from "Abracadabra", written by Steve Miller, as performed by the Steve Miller Band, and an interpolation from "Without Me", written by Jeff Bass, Kevin Bell, Anne Dudley, Trevor Horn, Marshall Mathers, and Malcolm McLaren, as performed by Eminem.
- "Somebody Save Me" contains a sample from "Save Me", written by David Ray Stevens and Jason DeFord, as performed by Jelly Roll.
- "Kyrie & Luka" contains a sample from "Move the Crowd", written and performed by Eric B. & Rakim.

== Personnel ==
Musicians

- Eminem – vocals
- Luis Resto – keyboards (tracks 1, 2, 4–13, 15–17, 19)
- Sly Pyper – additional vocals (track 2)
- Dem Jointz – guitar, keyboards (track 3)
- Steve King – guitar (track 4)
- Curt Chambers – bass, guitar (track 7)
- Jameil Aossey – synth, fx, drums (track 14)
- R Palmer – spoken word (track 7)
- Bizarre – additional vocals (track 8)
- Traci Nelson – additional vocals (track 8)
- Teeba – bass (track 9)
- JRGotTheHits – drums (track 9)
- Cocoa Sarai – additional vocals (track 10)
- David "Preach" Balfour – keyboards (track 10)
- Steve Miller – additional vocals (track 11)
- Devin Scillian – newsreader (track 12)
- Kimberly Gill – newsreader (track 12)
- Fifteenafter – additional vocals (track 22)

Technical

- Brian "Big Bass" Gardner – mastering
- Mike Strange – mixing (1–6, 8, 9, 12–17), engineering (all tracks)
- Steve King – mixing (track 4)
- Dr. Dre – mixing (tracks 7, 10, 11)
- Tony Campana – engineering
- D.A. Got That Dope – engineering (track 22)
- Dem Jointz – engineering (track 3)
- Don Cannon – engineering (track 5)
- Quentin "Q" Gilkey – engineering (tracks 7, 11)
- Fredwreck – engineering (tracks 7, 11)
- Lola Romero – engineering (tracks 7, 11)
- BabyTron – engineering (track 17)
- Milan Becker – engineering (track 17)
- Tom Kahre – engineering (track 17)
- Jeffery "Champ" Massey – engineering assistance (tracks 7, 11)
- Jeremy Zumo Kollie – engineering assistance (tracks 7, 11)
- Vic Luevanos – engineering assistance (tracks 7, 11)

== Charts ==
=== Weekly charts ===
Weekly chart performance
Chart (2024–2025)	Peak position
Australian Albums (ARIA)	1
Australian Hip Hop/R&B Albums (ARIA)	1
Austrian Albums (Ö3 Austria)	1
Belgian Albums (Ultratop Flanders)	1
Belgian Albums (Ultratop Wallonia)	1
Canadian Albums (Billboard)	1
Croatian International Albums (HDU)	9
Czech Albums (ČNS IFPI)	1
Danish Albums (Hitlisten)	2
Dutch Albums (Album Top 100)	1
Finnish Albums (Suomen virallinen lista)	1
French Albums (SNEP)	2
German Albums (Offizielle Top 100)	2
Greek Albums (IFPI)	45
Hungarian Albums (MAHASZ)	1
Icelandic Albums (Tónlistinn)	3
Irish Albums (Official Charts)	1
Italian Albums (FIMI)	8
Japanese Digital Albums (Oricon)	6
Japanese Hot Albums (Billboard Japan)	39
Lithuanian Albums (AGATA)	4
New Zealand Albums (RMNZ)	1
Norwegian Albums (VG-lista)	1
Polish Albums (ZPAV)	5
Portuguese Albums (AFP)	2
Scottish Albums (Official Charts)	3
Slovak Albums (ČNS IFPI)	1
Spanish Albums (Promusicae)	16
Swedish Albums (Sverigetopplistan)	1
Swiss Albums (Schweizer Hitparade)	1
UK Albums (Official Charts)	1
UK R&B Albums (Official Charts)	1
US Billboard 200	1
US Top R&B/Hip-Hop Albums (Billboard)	1

=== Year-end charts ===
Year-end chart performance
Chart (2024)	Position
Australian Albums (ARIA)	37
Australian Hip Hop/R&B Albums (ARIA)	7
Austrian Albums (Ö3 Austria)	40
Belgian Albums (Ultratop Flanders)	56
Belgian Albums (Ultratop Wallonia)	123
Canadian Albums (Billboard)	37
Dutch Albums (Album Top 100)	57
French Albums (SNEP)	133
German Albums (Offizielle Top 100)	48
New Zealand Albums (RMNZ)	21
Swiss Albums (Schweizer Hitparade)	8
UK Albums (OCC)	32
US Billboard 200	69
US Top R&B/Hip Hop Albums (Billboard)	23

Chart (2025)	Position
US Billboard 200	191
US Top R&B/Hip-Hop Albums (Billboard)	63

== Certifications ==
Certifications
Region	Certification	Certified units/sales
Australia (ARIA)	Gold	35,000^{‡}
Belgium (BRMA)	Gold	10,000^{‡}
Brazil (Pro-Música Brasil)	Gold	20,000^{‡}
Brazil (Pro-Música Brasil) Expanded Mourner's Edition	Gold	20,000^{‡}
Canada (Music Canada)	Platinum	80,000^{‡}
Denmark (IFPI Danmark)	Gold	10,000^{‡}
France (SNEP)	Gold	50,000^{‡}
New Zealand (RMNZ)	Platinum	15,000^{‡}
Poland (ZPAV)	Gold	10,000^{‡}
United Kingdom (BPI)	Gold	100,000^{‡}
^{‡} Sales+streaming figures based on certification alone.
