= Guilty Conscience 2 =

2024 song by Eminem

Song by Eminem

from the album The Death of Slim Shady (Coup de Grâce)
- Released: July 12, 2024
- Genre: Hip hop
- Length: 5:25
- Label: Shady; Aftermath; Interscope
- Songwriters: Marshall Mathers III; Luis Resto; Dwayne Abernathy Jr.; Farid Nassar
- Producers: Eminem; Dem Jointz; Fredwreck

Audio video
- "Guilty Conscience 2" on YouTube

"Guilty Conscience 2" is a song by American rapper Eminem from his twelfth studio album The Death of Slim Shady (Coup de Grâce) (2024). The sequel to his 1999 song "Guilty Conscience", it was produced by Eminem himself, Dem Jointz and Fredwreck.

== Composition ==
The song revolves around two characters attempting to take control of Eminem's conscience: Eminem himself and his alter ego Slim Shady. Over an instrumental of moody bass and piano keys, Eminem raps in a slightly distorted voice to represent Shady and his normal voice to represent himself. The notion of the song also references Eminem's song "My Darling" from his album Relapse, which also finds Eminem battling Shady for his soul. Eminem is depicted as being addicted to the controversies that Slim Shady has brought about and confronts Shady over the damaging impact on his career and artistry, although acknowledging it has allowed him to become successful and wealthy. He berates Shady for hypocritically portraying himself as being ill-treated while sinking to the level of his bullies and constantly "punching down" on others, deeming this behavior as "not cool". Eminem also calls Slim as "mentally 13" and "thirsty for some controversy", additionally comparing his embarrassing antics to actor David Carradine's accidental death by autoerotic asphyxiation. Slim claims they are a "team" and rationalizes his actions by discussing how they have also benefited Eminem's career in some ways.

After much arguing, the voices of Eminem and Slim Shady combine into one, but the former eventually gains the upper hand. The conflict culminates in Eminem shooting and killing Shady. It is revealed afterward that the battle only happened in a dream, as Eminem wakes up to his song "When I'm Gone" (a song where he also kills Shady) faintly playing in the background. He then calls his manager Paul Rosenberg and tells him about his nightmare.

== Critical reception ==
The song received generally positive reviews. In a review of The Death of Slim Shady (Coup de Grâce) for Sputnikmusic, Simon K. considered it among the tracks that "ground the record where needed by stripping down to hard-hitting hip-hop simplicity." Wren Graves of Consequence wrote the song "pits him at war with himself, to mixed, though enlightening results". Sy Shackleford of RapReviews regarded the production as "the right soundscape for Eminem to essentially roast himself." Writing for The Guardian, Alexis Petridis commented the song "gradually and effectively ratchets up a sense of tension." Jordan Bassett of NME remarked "The provocation is leavened by a device that sees Eminem repeatedly chastise Slim, like Dr. Frankenstein wrestling with his monstrous creation. At times, it's an effective dynamic; however distasteful you might find the jokes on 'Guilty Conscience 2' (the gag about deaf people is stunning in its cruelty), they are delivered in the context of an appalled Em insisting that what Slim's said is unacceptable." Spin's Peter A. Berry described the song as "a self-interrogative 'me versus myself' track with decent execution." Gabriel Bras Nevares of HotNewHipHop wrote, "Eminem -- or Slim Shady, rather -- tries so hard to offend that it comes off just as performative as how he characterizes the 'cancelation' he rallies against. Regardless of how much anyone tries to reiterate that 'that's the point,' this causes even more whiplash between his typical toilet humor and linguistic creativity. Still, The Death Of Slim Shady's saving grace, 'Guilty Conscience 2,' contextualizes these aspects compellingly".

Some critics had more mixed feelings relating to the song. Karan Singh of HipHopDX stated the "nostalgia evoked" by the song "fails to pair well with" the style of certain other tracks on the album. Louder's Merlin Alderslade wrote of the song, "It'd make for a fascinating piece of introspective rap if it wasn't for the fact that it comes after almost 40 minutes of Eminem endlessly wanging on about 'woke' culture, 'the PC police' and being 'cancelled', all layered under what seems to be a concerted attempt to offend as many people as possible." Paul Attard of Slant Magazine commented "Eminem's shortcomings as a 'serious' thinker are most evident on 'Guilty Conscience 2'", which he also believed was "overly theatrical", "But this moment seems to signal growth on an album that includes lines like 'They want me to bounce like a fabric softener.'" Pitchfork's Alphonse Pierre gave a negative review, writing "The two characters argue like drunken reality show contestants, scrunching their noses and waving a middle finger" and describing the lyrics mentioning David Carradine as "immediately decimating his own point" and "needless". Regarding the combination of the two voices, Pierre wrote "It's probably supposed to be a moment of absolution, but reads more like an admission of guilt."

== Charts ==
Chart performance for "Guilty Conscience 2"
| Chart (2024) | Peak position |
|---|---|
| Australia (ARIA) | 46 |
| Canada Hot 100 (Billboard) | 31 |
| Global 200 (Billboard) | 51 |
| New Zealand (Recorded Music NZ) | 32 |
| Portugal (AFP) | 172 |
| UK Hip Hop/R&B (Official Charts) | 14 |
| US Billboard Hot 100 | 45 |
| US Hot R&B/Hip-Hop Songs (Billboard) | 16 |
