= Luis Resto (musician) =

American producer and songwriter (born 1961)

- Born: Luis Edgardo Resto; July 22, 1961 (age 64); Ann Arbor, Michigan, U.S.
- Origin: Detroit, Michigan, U.S.
- Genres: Hip-hop
- Occupations: Musician; songwriter; record producer
- Instrument: keyboards
- Years active: 1981–present
- Labels: Shady; Resto World
- Website: luisresto.com

Luis Edgardo Resto (born July 22, 1961) is an American musician, songwriter, record producer, and keyboardist who has worked closely with rapper Eminem since his third major-label album The Eminem Show. He is of Puerto Rican descent and was raised in Garden City, Michigan, a suburb of Detroit.

== Career ==
Resto's career in recorded music began in the early 1980s in Detroit, with Michael Henderson and Was (Not Was). He continued playing keyboards and co-writing songs for a wide variety of artists (including many produced by Don Was), ranging from Anita Baker to Patti Smith to the Highwaymen to Vertical Horizon to Fuel, before beginning a lengthy collaboration with Eminem in 2001. He has played the keyboards for several Eminem-produced tracks and is credited for additional production on most Eminem-produced tracks on Encore. Resto released his own solo album titled Combo De Momento which was released under his own imprint Resto World Music on May 18, 2010. He co-produced the Oscar-winning song, "Lose Yourself", featured in the movie 8 Mile with Jeff Bass and Eminem.

== Discography ==
- Combo De Momento (2010)
- One Small Light (2013)

== Music credits ==
=== 1999 ===
- Vertical Horizon – Everything You Want (Studio album released June 15, 1999) (as Keyboardist)

=== 2001 ===
- D12 – Devil's Night (Studio album released June 19, 2001)

19. "Girls" (Limp Bizkit diss) (performed by Eminem) (hidden track)

- Jay-Z – The Blueprint (Studio album released September 11, 2001)

12. "Renegade" (featuring Eminem)

=== 2002 ===
- Eminem – The Eminem Show (Studio album released May 26, 2002)

02. "White America"
05. "Square Dance"
07. "Soldier"
08. "Say Goodbye Hollywood"
14. "Hailie's Song"
18. "'Til I Collapse" (Featuring Nate Dogg)

- Xzibit – Man vs. Machine (Studio album released October 1, 2002)

11. "My Name" (featuring Eminem and Nate Dogg)

- Various Artists – 8 Mile (Soundtrack) (Studio album released October 29, 2002)

01. "Lose Yourself" (Eminem)
02. "Love Me" (Eminem, Obie Trice and 50 Cent)
03. "8 Mile" (Eminem)
05. "Places To Go" (50 Cent)
06. "Rap Game" (D12 featuring 50 Cent)
07. "8 Miles and Runnin'" (Jay-Z featuring Freeway)
08. "Spit Shine" (Xzibit)
16. "Rabbit Run" (Eminem)

=== 2003 ===
- 50 Cent – Get Rich or Die Tryin' (Studio album released February 18, 2003)

03. "Patiently Waiting" (featuring Eminem)
04. "Many Men (Wish Death)"
06. "High All the Time"
15. "Don't Push Me" (featuring Lloyd Banks and Eminem)

- Various Artists – Cradle 2 the Grave (Studio album released February 18, 2003)

02. "Go to Sleep" (Eminem featuring Obie Trice and DMX)

- King Gordy – The Entity (Studio album released June 24, 2003)

02. "Nightmares"
03. "The Pain"
10. "Pass Me A Lighter"
16. "Nobody Hates Nothin'"

- Obie Trice – Cheers (Studio album released September 23, 2003)

01. "Average Man"
02. "Cheers"
03. "Got Some Teeth"
04. "Lady" (featuring Eminem)
05. "Don't Come Down"
09. "Follow My Life"
13. "Hands on You" (featuring Eminem)
14. "Hoodrats"
16. "Never Forget Ya"
17. "Outro" (featuring D12)

- Jay-Z – The Black Album (Studio album released November 14, 2003)

09. "Moment Of Clarity"

- G-Unit – Beg for Mercy (Studio album released November 14, 2003)

03. "My Buddy"
04. "I'm So Hood"

=== 2004 ===
- DJ Kay Slay – The Streetsweeper, Vol. 2 (Studio album released March 30, 2004)

05. "I'm Gone" (featuring Eminem and Obie Trice)

- D12 – D12 World (Studio album released April 27, 2004)

01. "Git Up"
02. "Loyalty" (featuring Obie Trice)
03. "Just Like U"
04. "I'll Be Damned"
06. "My Band"
08. "6 in the Morning (Come On In)"
10. "Leave Dat Boy Alone"
11. "Get My Gun"
13. "Bitch" (featuring Dina Rae)
21. "Keep Talkin'" (bonus track)
Special Edition Bonus Disc
02. "Slow Your Roll"

- Jadakiss – Kiss of Death (Studio album released June 22, 2004)

16. "Welcome to D-Block" (performed by The L.O.X. featuring Eminem)

- Lloyd Banks – The Hunger for More (Studio album released June 29, 2004)

04. "On Fire" (featuring 50 Cent)

- Eminem – Encore (Studio album released November 12, 2004)

02. "Evil Deeds"
04. "Yellow Brick Road"
05. "Like Toy Soldiers"
07. "Puke"
08. "My 1st Single"
15. "Spend Some Time" (featuring Obie Trice, Stat Quo and 50 Cent)
16. "Mockingbird"
17. "Crazy In Love"
18. "One Shot 2 Shot" (featuring D12)
20. "Encore/Curtains Down"

- Eminem – Encore (Bonus CD released November 12, 2004)

01. "We As Americans"
02. "Love You More"
03. "Ricky Ticky Toc"

- 2Pac – Loyal to the Game (Studio album released December 14, 2004)

01. "Soldier Like Me (Return of the Soulja)" (featuring Eminem)
02. "The Uppercut" (featuring E.D.I. Mean and Young Noble)
03. "Out on Bail"
04. "Ghetto Gospel"
05. "Black Cotton" (featuring Eminem, Kastro and Young Noble)
06. "Loyal to the Game" (featuring G-Unit)
07. "Thugs Get Lonely Too" (featuring Nate Dogg)
08. "N.I.G.G.A. (Never Ignorant about Getting Goals Accomplished)" (featuring Jadakiss)
09. "Who Do You Love?"
10. "Crooked Nigga Too"
11. "Don't You Trust Me?" (featuring Dido)
12. "Hennessy" (featuring Obie Trice)
13. "Thug 4 Life"

=== 2005 ===
- The Game – The Documentary (Studio album released January 18, 2005)

14. "We Ain't" (featuring Eminem)

- 50 Cent – The Massacre (Studio album released March 3, 2005)

02. "In My Hood"
04. "I'm Supposed To Die Tonight"
10. "Ski Mask Way"
16. "My Toy Soldier" (featuring Tony Yayo)

- Bizarre – Hannicap Circus (Studio album released June 28, 2005)

08. "Rockstar"

- Tony Yayo – Thoughts of a Predicate Felon (Studio album released August 30, 2005)

03. "It Is What It Is" (featuring Spider Loc)
07. "Drama Setter" (featuring Eminem and Obie Trice)

- Eminem – Curtain Call: The Hits (Greatest hits album released December 6, 2005; contains three new songs)

02. "Fack"
07. "Shake That" (featuring Nate Dogg)
16. "When I'm Gone"

- Trick-Trick – The People vs. (Studio album released December 27, 2005)

03. "Welcome 2 Detroit" (featuring Eminem)
07. "No More to Say" (featuring Proof and Eminem)

=== 2006 ===
- Obie Trice – Second Round's on Me (Studio album released August 15, 2006)

02. "Wake Up"
03. "Violent"
05. "Lay Down"
06. "Snitch" (featuring Akon)
08. "Ballad Of Obie Trice"
09. "Jamaican Girl" (featuring Brick & Lace)
10. "Kill Me a Mutha"
12. "All of My Life" (featuring Nate Dogg)
13. "Ghetto" (featuring Trey Songz)
14. "There They Go" (featuring Big Herk, Eminem and Trick-Trick)
17. "Everywhere I Go" (featuring 50 Cent)
18. "Obie Story"

- Lloyd Banks – Rotten Apple (Studio album released October 10, 2006)

06. "Hands Up" (featuring 50 Cent)

- Akon – Konvicted (Studio album released November 14, 2006)

03. "Smack That" (featuring Eminem)

- Lil Scrappy – Bred 2 Die, Born 2 Live (Studio album released December 5, 2006)

19. "Lord Have Mercy"

- Eminem Presents: The Re-Up (Studio album released December 5, 2006)

01. "Shady Narcotics (Intro)" (Eminem)
02. "We're Back" (Eminem, Obie Trice, Stat Quo, Bobby Creekwater and Ca$his)
04. "Murder" (Bizarre and Kuniva)
06. "The Re-Up" (Eminem and 50 Cent)
07. "You Don't Know" (Eminem, 50 Cent, Lloyd Banks and Ca$his)
08. "Jimmy Crack Corn" (Eminem and 50 Cent)
09. "Trapped" (Proof)
11. "Talkin' All That" (Ca$his)
16. "Smack That (Remix)" (Akon featuring Stat Quo and Bobby Creekwater)
17. "Public Enemy #1" (Eminem)
19. "Ski Mask Way (Eminem Remix)" (50 Cent)
20. "Shake That (Remix)" (Eminem, Nate Dogg, Obie Trice and Bobby Creekwater)
22. "No Apologies" (Eminem)

=== 2007 ===
- Young Buck – Buck the World (Studio album released March 27, 2007)

17. "Lose My Mind"

- Cashis – County Hound EP (Studio album released May 22, 2007)

06. "Pistol Poppin'" (featuring Eminem)

=== 2009 ===
- Eminem – Relapse (Studio album released May 15, 2009)

17. "Beautiful"

Deluxe version
21. "My Darling"
22. "Careful What You Wish For"

- Eminem – Relapse: Refill (Studio album released December 21, 2009)

04. "Elevator"

=== 2010 ===
- Lil Wayne – Rebirth (Studio album released February 2, 2010)

08. "Drop the World" (featuring Eminem)

- B.o.B – B.o.B Presents: The Adventures of Bobby Ray (Studio album released April 27, 2010)

12. "Airplanes, Part II" (featuring Eminem and Hayley Williams of Paramore)

- Eminem – Recovery (Studio album released June 18, 2010)

05. "W.T.P."
07. "Not Afraid"

- Lloyd Banks – The Hunger for More 2 (Studio album released November 22, 2010)

17. "Where I'm At" (featuring Eminem)

=== 2011 ===
- Bad Meets Evil – Hell: The Sequel (EP released June 13, 2011)

01. "Welcome 2 Hell"
02. "Fast Lane"
03. "The Reunion"
04. "Above the Law"
06. "A Kiss"
07. "Lighters" (featuring Bruno Mars)
09. "Loud Noises" (featuring Slaughterhouse)

- Royce da 5'9" – Success Is Certain (Studio album released June 13, 2011)

01. "Legendary" (featuring Travis Barker)

=== 2012 ===
- Slaughterhouse – Welcome to: Our House (Studio album released August 28, 2012)

01. "The Slaughter" (Intro)
02. "Our House" (featuring Eminem and Skylar Grey)
03. "Coffin" (featuring Busta Rhymes)
04. "Throw That" (featuring Eminem)
05. "Hammer Dance"
06. "Get Up"
07. "My Life" (featuring Cee Lo Green)
08. "We Did It" (Skit)
09. "Flip a Bird"
10. "Throw It Away" (featuring Swizz Beatz)
11. "Rescue Me" (featuring Skylar Grey)
12. "Frat House"
13. "Goodbye"
14. "Park It Sideways"
15. "Die"
16. "Our Way" (Outro)
Deluxe version
17. "Asylum" (featuring Eminem)
18. "Walk of Shame"
20. "Place to Be" (featuring B.o.B)

=== 2013 ===
- Eminem – The Marshall Mathers LP 2 (Studio album released November 5, 2013)

04. "So Much Better"
10. "Brainless"
11. "Stronger Than I Was"
15. "Headlights" (featuring Nate Ruess)

=== 2014 ===
- Various Artists – Shady XV (Studio album released November 24, 2014)

01. "Shady XV" (Eminem)
02. "Psychopath Killer" (Slaughterhouse featuring Eminem and Yelawolf)
03. "Die Alone" (Eminem featuring Kobe)
04. "Vegas" (Bad Meets Evil)
06. "Guts Over Fear" (Eminem featuring Sia)
09. "Fine Line" (Eminem)
10. "Twisted" (Skylar Grey, Eminem and Yelawolf)
11. "Right for Me" (Eminem)

=== 2015 ===
- Yelawolf – Love Story (Studio album released April 21, 2015)

03. "American You"

- Various Artists – Southpaw (soundtrack) (Studio album released July 24, 2015)

02. "Kings Never Die" (Eminem featuring Gwen Stefani)
04. "This Corner" (Denaun)
09. "All I Think About" (Bad Meets Evil)
13. "Phenomenal" (Eminem)

=== 2017 ===
- Eminem – Revival (Studio album released December 15, 2017)

02. "Believe"

=== 2018 ===
- Nicki Minaj – Queen (Studio album released August 10, 2018)

02. "Majesty" (with Labrinth, featuring Eminem)

- Eminem – Kamikaze (Studio album released August 31, 2018)

07. "Stepping Stone"
13. "Venom" (Music from the Motion Picture)

=== 2020 ===
- Eminem – Music to Be Murdered By (Studio album released January 17, 2020)

01. "Premonition (Intro)"
03. "You Gon' Learn" (featuring Royce da 5'9" and White Gold)
08. "Darkness"
12. "Stepdad"
13. "Marsh"
19. "I Will" (featuring Joell Ortiz, Royce da 5'9" and Kxng Crooked)

- Eminem – Music to Be Murdered By – Side B (Studio album released December 18, 2020)

04. "Tone Deaf"
05. "Book of Rhymes" (featuring DJ Premier)

=== 2024 ===
- Eminem – The Death of Slim Shady (Coup de Grâce) (Studio album released July 12, 2024)

01. "Renaissance" (Produced with Eminem)
04. "Brand New Dance" (Produced with Eminem)
06. "All You Got - skit" (Produced with Eminem)
07. "Lucifer" (Produced with Dr. Dre and Callus)
08. "Antichrist" (Produced with Eminem)
09. "Fuel" (Produced with Denaun Porter, Teeba and Eminem)
10. "Road Rage" (Produced with Dem Jointz and Dr. Dre)
11. "Houdini" (Produced with Eminem)
12. "Breaking News - skit" (Produced with Eminem)
13. "Guilty Conscience 2" (Produced with FredWreck, Dem Jointz, Dr. Dre and Eminem)
14. "Head Honcho" (Produced with Jameil Aossey and Eminem)
16. "Bad One" (Produced with Eminem)
19. "Somebody Save Me" (Produced with Emile Haynie, Benny Blanco and David Ray)

== Awards and nominations ==
Year	Nominee / work	Award	Result	Ref.
2002	"Lose Yourself"	Academy Award for Best Original Song	Won	
2003	"Lose Yourself"	Grammy Award for Best Song Written for Visual Media	Nominated	
2003	"Lose Yourself"	Grammy Award for Song of the Year	Nominated	
2003	"Lose Yourself"	Grammy Award for Best Rap Song	Won	
2010	"Not Afraid"	Grammy Award for Best Rap Song	Nominated	
