= Eminem singles discography =

Singles recorded by Eminem

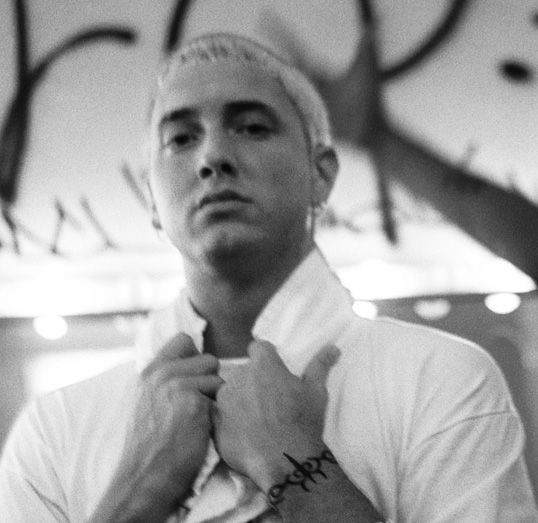
- Eminem in 1999
- As lead artist: 62
- As featured artist: 22
- Promotional singles: 19

American rapper Eminem has released 63 singles as a lead artist and 19 promotional singles. He has also featured in 21 singles as a guest artist, while entering the charts with over 125 additional songs.

Eminem's debut single, "Just Don't Give a Fuck", was released in 1998 and was included in Slim Shady EP, as well as in his second studio album, The Slim Shady LP, which featured a re-worked version of the song. Eminem's first ever song to enter the Billboard Hot 100 was "My Name Is", which was released in 1999 and became the most successful single from The Slim Shady LP. Along with "Guilty Conscience", it reached the top 5 in the UK.

The lead single from Eminem's third studio album, The Marshall Mathers LP, was the song "The Real Slim Shady", which became his first entry in the top ten of the Billboard Hot 100. The third single from the album, "Stan", featured vocals from British singer Dido, sampled from her song "Thank You". "Stan" was the album's most successful single outside of the United States, while it failed to reach the top 50 in Eminem's home country.

In 2002, Eminem released the singles "Without Me" and "Cleanin' Out My Closet" from his album The Eminem Show, as well as the single "Lose Yourself" from the 8 Mile soundtrack, which became his first number one song on the Hot 100 and remained on the top for 12 weeks. The song also reached the top of various national charts worldwide.

In 2009, the song "Crack a Bottle", a collaboration with label-mates Dr. Dre and 50 Cent, became Eminem's second number one on the Hot 100 and broke the record for opening week download sales in the US, with 418,000 copies sold in the first week.

Recovery's singles "Not Afraid" and "Love the Way You Lie" featuring Rihanna, both released in 2010, became Eminem's third and fourth number one songs on the Hot 100; the latter also reached the top of various national charts worldwide. In June 2014, his song "Not Afraid" was diamond certified by the RIAA, thus making Eminem the first artist with two digital diamond awards by RIAA.

In August 2013, Eminem released the single "Berzerk" which debuted number 3 on the Billboard Hot 100 and preceded his eighth studio album The Marshall Mathers LP 2. The album spawned the singles "Survival", which was showcased during the Call of Duty: Ghosts reveal trailer, "Rap God", and "The Monster" featuring Rihanna. "The Monster" became Eminem's fifth number 1 single on the Hot 100, tying him with rappers Ludacris and P. Diddy for rappers with the most number 1 singles in the US. In May 2014, Eminem was announced as the most-streamed artist of all time on Spotify.

From 2017 to 2020, Eminem released various hit singles, including "River" featuring Ed Sheeran, "Lucky You" featuring Joyner Lucas, "Killshot", and "Godzilla" featuring Juice Wrld. The latter two debuted at number 3 on the Billboard Hot 100. In 2024, Eminem released "Houdini" as the lead single to his twelfth studio album The Death of Slim Shady (Coup de Grâce). It topped the charts in many countries, as well as debuting at number 1 on the Billboard Global 200 and number 2 on the Hot 100.

== As lead artist ==
=== 1990s ===
Title	Year	Peak chart positions										Certifications	Album
Title	Year	US	AUS	BEL (FL)	CAN	GER	IRL	NZ	SWE	SWI	UK	Certifications	Album
"Just Don't Give a Fuck"	1998	— (Note: "Just Don't Give a Fuck" did not enter the Billboard Hot 100, but peaked at number 14 on the Bubbling Under Hot 100 Singles chart.)	—	—	—	—	—	—	—	—	—	ARIA: Gold; RMNZ: Gold	The Slim Shady LP
"My Name Is"	1999	36	13	33	38	37	4	4	16	29	2	RIAA: 3× Platinum; ARIA: 4× Platinum; BPI: 2× Platinum; RMNZ: 2× Platinum	The Slim Shady LP
"Role Model"	1999	— (Note: "Role Model" did not enter the Billboard Hot 100, but peaked at number 11 on the Bubbling Under R&B/Hip-Hop Singles chart.)	—	—	—	—	—	—	—	—	—	RIAA: Gold; ARIA: Platinum; BPI: Silver; RMNZ: Gold	The Slim Shady LP
"Guilty Conscience" (featuring Dr. Dre)	1999	—	—	— (Note: "Guilty Conscience" did not enter the Flanders Ultratop 50, but peaked at number 17 on the Ultratip chart.)	—	40	12	—	25	—	5	RIAA: Platinum; ARIA: Platinum; BPI: Platinum; RMNZ: Platinum	The Slim Shady LP
"—" denotes a recording that did not chart or was not released in that territory.

=== 2000s ===
Title	Year	Peak chart positions										Certifications	Album
Title	Year	US	AUS	BEL (FL)	CAN	GER	IRL	NZ	SWE	SWI	UK	Certifications	Album
"The Real Slim Shady"	2000	4	11	2	6	7	1	15	3	2	1	RIAA: 7× Platinum; ARIA: 11× Platinum; BPI: 5× Platinum; BRMA: Platinum; BVMI: 3× Gold; GLF: Platinum; IFPI SWI: Gold; MC: 2× Platinum; RMNZ: 7× Platinum	The Marshall Mathers LP
"The Way I Am"	2000	58	34	9	40	19	4	—	6	19	8	RIAA: 2× Platinum; ARIA: 3× Platinum; BPI: Platinum; GLF: Gold; RMNZ: 2× Platinum	The Marshall Mathers LP
"Stan" (featuring Dido)	2000	51	1	2	—	1	1	14	3	1	1	RIAA: 4× Platinum; ARIA: 9× Platinum; BPI: 5× Platinum; BRMA: Platinum; BVMI: 3× Gold; IFPI SWI: Gold; RMNZ: 5× Platinum	The Marshall Mathers LP
"I'm Back"	2001	—	—	— (Note: "I'm Back" did not enter the Flanders Ultratop 50, but peaked at number five on the Ultratip chart.)	—	—	—	—	—	—	—		The Marshall Mathers LP
"Hellbound" (with J-Black and Masta Ace) {verse from "Hustlers & Hardcore"}	2002	—	—	— (Note: "Hellbound" did not enter the Flanders Ultratop 50, but peaked at number 10 on the Ultratip chart.)	—	—	—	—	—	85	183		Game Over
"Without Me"	2002	2	1	1	4	1	1	1	1	1	1	RIAA: 7× Platinum; ARIA: 17× Platinum; BPI: 5× Platinum; BRMA: Platinum; BVMI: 3× Platinum; GLF: Platinum; IFPI SWI: Platinum; RMNZ: 8× Platinum	The Eminem Show
"Cleanin' Out My Closet"	2002	4	3	6	—	4	3	5	3	5	4	RIAA: 3× Platinum; ARIA: 5× Platinum; BPI: Platinum; BRMA: Gold; BVMI: Gold; GLF: Gold; RMNZ: 2× Platinum	The Eminem Show
"Lose Yourself"	2002	1	1	1	1	2	1	1	1	1	1	RIAA: 13× Platinum (Diamond); ARIA: 20× Platinum; BPI: 6× Platinum; BRMA: Platinum; BVMI: 3× Platinum; GLF: Platinum; IFPI SWI: Platinum; MC: 6× Platinum; RMNZ: 9× Platinum	8 Mile: Music from and Inspired by the Motion Picture
"Superman" (featuring Dina Rae)	2003	15	—	—	—	—	—	42	—	—	—	RIAA: 2× Platinum; ARIA: 5× Platinum; BPI: 2× Platinum; BVMI: Gold; RMNZ: 4× Platinum	The Eminem Show
"Sing for the Moment"	2003	14	5	6	2	5	3	5	11	8	6	RIAA: 2× Platinum; ARIA: 4× Platinum; BPI: Platinum; BVMI: Gold; RMNZ: 2× Platinum	The Eminem Show
"Business"	2003	—	4	28	—	15	7	14	—	—	6	RIAA: Gold; ARIA: 2× Platinum; BPI: Gold; RMNZ: Platinum	The Eminem Show
"Just Lose It"	2004	6	1	6	—	2	2	1	12	1	1	RIAA: 2× Platinum; ARIA: 4× Platinum; BPI: Platinum; BVMI: Gold; RMNZ: Platinum	Encore
"Encore" (featuring Dr. Dre and 50 Cent)	2004	25	—	—	—	—	—	—	—	—	116		Encore
"Like Toy Soldiers"	2005	34	4	11	21	8	3	2	14	3	1	RIAA: 3× Platinum; ARIA: 4× Platinum; BPI: Platinum; BVMI: Gold; RMNZ: Platinum	Encore
"Mockingbird"	2005	11	9	30	—	5	7	8	17	5	4	RIAA: 5× Platinum; ARIA: 9× Platinum; BPI: 4× Platinum; BRMA: Gold; BVMI: 5× Gold; RMNZ: 6× Platinum	Encore
"Ass Like That"	2005	60	10	20	—	31	4	9	—	25	4	RIAA: Platinum; ARIA: 3× Platinum; BPI: Gold; RMNZ: Platinum	Encore
"When I'm Gone"	2005	8	1	8	16	6	5	2	5	7	4	RIAA: 5× Platinum; ARIA: 6× Platinum; BPI: Platinum; BVMI: Gold; RMNZ: 2× Platinum	Curtain Call: The Hits
"Shake That" (featuring Nate Dogg)	2006	6	—	— (Note: "Shake That" did not enter the Flanders Ultratop 50, but peaked at number two on the Ultratip chart.)	—	—	64	—	59	—	90	RIAA: 4× Platinum; ARIA: 7× Platinum; BPI: Platinum; BVMI: Gold; GLF: Gold; RMNZ: 5× Platinum	Curtain Call: The Hits
"You Don't Know" (featuring 50 Cent, Lloyd Banks and Cashis)	2006	12	—	— (Note: "You Don't Know" did not enter the Flanders Ultratop 50, but peaked at number seven on the Ultratip chart.)	—	—	5	—	—	—	32	RIAA: Platinum; ARIA: Gold; BPI: Gold; RMNZ: Platinum	Eminem Presents: The Re-Up
"Jimmy Crack Corn" (with 50 Cent)	2007	— (Note: "Jimmy Crack Corn" did not enter the Billboard Hot 100, but peaked at number one on the Bubbling Under Hot 100 Singles chart.)	—	—	—	—	—	—	—	—	—		Eminem Presents: The Re-Up
"Crack a Bottle" (with Dr. Dre and 50 Cent)	2009	1	18	39	1	—	6	6	9	4	4	RIAA: 3× Platinum; ARIA: 2× Platinum; BPI: Platinum; RMNZ: Platinum	Relapse
"We Made You"	2009	9	1	12	6	9	1	1	11	4	4	RIAA: 2× Platinum; ARIA: 4× Platinum; BPI: Platinum; RMNZ: Platinum	Relapse
"3 a.m."	2009	32	38	—	24	—	—	—	—	—	56	RIAA: Gold; ARIA: Gold	Relapse
"Old Time's Sake" (featuring Dr. Dre)	2009	25	76	—	14	—	49	—	—	—	61		Relapse
"Beautiful"	2009	17	33	— (Note: "Beautiful" did not enter the Flanders Ultratop 50, but peaked at number 16 on the Ultratip chart.)	8	39	22	4	47	8	12	RIAA: 3× Platinum; ARIA: 3× Platinum; BPI: Platinum; RMNZ: 2× Platinum	Relapse
"Forever" (with Drake, Kanye West and Lil Wayne) (Note: "Forever" is also included on Music Inspired by More than a Game.)	2009	8	99	—	26	—	41	—	—	68	42	RIAA: 6× Platinum; ARIA: 2× Platinum; BPI: Platinum; RMNZ: Platinum	Relapse: Refill
"—" denotes a recording that did not chart or was not released in that territory.

=== 2010s ===
Title	Year	Peak chart positions										Certifications	Album
Title	Year	US	AUS	BEL (FL)	CAN	GER	IRL	NZ	SWE	SWI	UK	Certifications	Album
"Not Afraid"	2010	1	4	13	1	9	3	8	5	2	5	RIAA: 11× Platinum (Diamond); ARIA: 11× Platinum; BPI: 3× Platinum; BVMI: 3× Gold; IFPI SWI: Platinum; RMNZ: 4× Platinum	Recovery
"Love the Way You Lie" (featuring Rihanna)	2010	1	1	1	1	1	1	1	1	1	2	RIAA: 13× Platinum (Diamond); ARIA: 18× Platinum; BPI: 6× Platinum; BRMA: Gold; BVMI: 3× Gold; IFPI SWI: 3× Platinum; RMNZ: 6× Platinum	Recovery
"No Love" (featuring Lil Wayne)	2010	23	21	— (Note: "No Love" did not enter the Flanders Ultratop 50, but peaked at number four on the Ultratip chart.)	24	17	33	22	—	39	33	RIAA: 5× Platinum; ARIA: 3× Platinum; BPI: Platinum; BVMI: Gold; RMNZ: Platinum	Recovery
"Space Bound"	2011	— (Note: "Space Bound" did not enter the Billboard Hot 100, but peaked at number 19 on the Bubbling Under Hot 100 Singles chart.)	51	— (Note: "Space Bound" did not enter the Flanders Ultratop 50, but peaked at number 17 on the Ultratip chart.)	—	—	31	—	—	—	34	RIAA: 2× Platinum; ARIA: 2× Platinum; BPI: Platinum; RMNZ: Platinum	Recovery
"Berzerk"	2013	3	5	44	2	10	16	12	56	9	2	RIAA: 4× Platinum; ARIA: 3× Platinum; BPI: Platinum; BVMI: Gold; GLF: Gold; MC: 2× Platinum; RMNZ: Platinum	The Marshall Mathers LP 2
"Survival"	2013	16	18	49	6	20	22	13	26	13	22	RIAA: 2× Platinum; ARIA: Platinum; BPI: Gold; BVMI: Gold; GLF: Gold; RMNZ: Gold	The Marshall Mathers LP 2
"Rap God"	2013	7	15	— (Note: "Rap God" did not enter the Flanders Ultratop 50, but peaked at number 65 on the Ultratip chart.)	5	33	16	4	46	31	5	RIAA: 7× Platinum; ARIA: 6× Platinum; BPI: 2× Platinum; BVMI: Gold; GLF: Gold; MC: Platinum; RMNZ: 3× Platinum	The Marshall Mathers LP 2
"The Monster" (featuring Rihanna)	2013	1	1	2	1	3	1	1	1	1	1	RIAA: 8× Platinum; ARIA: 11× Platinum; BPI: 3× Platinum; BRMA: Gold; BVMI: 3× Gold; GLF: 5× Platinum; IFPI SWI: Platinum; MC: 2× Platinum; RMNZ: 5× Platinum	The Marshall Mathers LP 2
"Headlights" (featuring Nate Ruess)	2014	45	21	— (Note: "Headlights" did not enter the Flanders Ultratop 50, but peaked at number 49 on the Ultratip chart.)	54	—	60	—	—	—	63	RIAA: Platinum; ARIA: 2× Platinum; BPI: Silver; RMNZ: Gold	The Marshall Mathers LP 2
"Guts Over Fear" (featuring Sia)	2014	22	22	— (Note: "Guts Over Fear" did not enter the Flanders Ultratop 50, but peaked at number 15 on the Ultratip chart.)	9	35	48	22	40	30	10	RIAA: Platinum; ARIA: Platinum; BPI: Silver; RMNZ: Gold	Shady XV
"Detroit vs. Everybody" (with Royce da 5'9", Big Sean, Danny Brown, DeJ Loaf and Trick-Trick)	2014	— (Note: "Detroit vs. Everybody" did not enter the Billboard Hot 100, but peaked at number eight on the Bubbling Under Hot 100 Singles chart.)	86	—	87	—	—	—	—	—	—		Shady XV
"Phenomenal"	2015	47	81	—	61	—	—	—	—	—	57	RIAA: Gold; ARIA: Gold	Southpaw: Music from and Inspired by the Motion Picture
"Kings Never Die" (featuring Gwen Stefani)	2015	80	62	—	51	—	—	—	—	—	82	RIAA: Gold; ARIA: Gold; BPI: Silver; RMNZ: Gold	Southpaw: Music from and Inspired by the Motion Picture
"Walk on Water" (featuring Beyoncé)	2017	14	10	32	22	16	8	18	7	5	7	RIAA: Gold; ARIA: Platinum; BPI: Silver; GLF: Gold; MC: Platinum; RMNZ: Gold	Revival
"River" (featuring Ed Sheeran)	2017	11	2	3	3	2	2	3	1	2	1	ARIA: 7× Platinum; BPI: 3× Platinum; BRMA: Platinum; BVMI: Gold; GLF: 2× Platinum; MC: Platinum; RMNZ: 4× Platinum	Revival
"Nowhere Fast" (featuring Kehlani)	2018	—	76	—	81	98	59	—	96	—	—	ARIA: Gold; RMNZ: Gold	Revival
"Remind Me"	2018	— (Note: "Remind Me" did not enter the Billboard Hot 100, but peaked at number 21 on the Bubbling Under Hot 100 Singles chart.)	83	—	72	51	40	—	67	24	—		Revival
"Fall"	2018	12	22	— (Note: "Fall" did not enter the Flanders Ultratop 50, but peaked at number 16 on the Ultratip chart.)	4	37	15	9	23	7	8	RIAA: Platinum; ARIA: 2× Platinum; BPI: Gold; MC: Gold; RMNZ: Platinum	Kamikaze
"Killshot"	2018	3	11	— (Note: "Killshot" did not enter the Flanders Ultratop 50, but peaked at number 29 on the Ultratip chart.)	1	81	17	6	23	30	13	ARIA: 2× Platinum; BPI: Gold; RMNZ: 2× Platinum	Non-album single
"Venom"	2018	43	25	—	15	77	24	32	64	47	16	RIAA: 2× Platinum; ARIA: 4× Platinum; BPI: Platinum; BVMI: Gold; RMNZ: 2× Platinum	Kamikaze
"Lucky You" (featuring Joyner Lucas)	2018	6	4	46	3	19	7	2	3	2	6	RIAA: 3× Platinum; ARIA: 4× Platinum; BPI: Platinum; MC: Platinum; RMNZ: 2× Platinum	Kamikaze
"—" denotes a recording that did not chart or was not released in that territory.

=== 2020s ===
Title	Year	Peak chart positions										Certifications	Album
Title	Year	US	AUS	CAN	GER	IRL	NZ	SWE	SWI	UK	WW	Certifications	Album
"Darkness"	2020	28	32	10	47	22	35	58	13	17	—	RIAA: Gold; ARIA: Gold; BPI: Silver; RMNZ: Gold	Music to Be Murdered By
"Godzilla" (featuring Juice Wrld)	2020	3	3	3	16	1	2	7	4	1	124	RIAA: 3× Platinum; ARIA: 6× Platinum; BPI: 3× Platinum; BVMI: Platinum; MC: 2× Platinum; RMNZ: 4× Platinum	Music to Be Murdered By
"The Adventures of Moon Man & Slim Shady" (with Kid Cudi)	2020	22	90	20	—	30	— (Note: "The Adventures of Moon Man & Slim Shady" did not chart on the NZ Top 40 Singles chart, but did chart at number five on the NZ Hot Singles chart.)	—	—	44	—		Non-album single
"Gnat"	2020	60	—	34	—	65	— (Note: "Gnat" did not enter the NZ Top 40 Singles Chart, but peaked at number six on the NZ Hot Singles Chart.)	—	—	65	69	ARIA: Gold; BPI: Silver	Music to Be Murdered By – Side B
"Killer" (solo or featuring Jack Harlow and Cordae)	2021	62	92	37	—	64	— (Note: "Killer" did not enter the NZ Top 40 Singles Chart, but peaked at number two on the NZ Hot Singles Chart.)	— (Note: "Killer" did not enter the Swedish Singles Chart, but peaked at number seven on the Swedish Heatseekers chart.)	—	77	67	RIAA: Platinum; ARIA: Gold; RMNZ: Gold	Music to Be Murdered By – Side B
"The King and I" (featuring CeeLo Green) (Note: "The King and I" is also included on Elvis: Original Motion Picture Soundtrack.)	2022	—	—	—	—	97	— (Note: "The King and I" did not enter the NZ Top 40 Singles Chart, but peaked at number 15 on the NZ Hot Singles Chart.)	—	—	86	—		Curtain Call 2
"From the D 2 the LBC" (with Snoop Dogg)	2022	72	64	35	—	48	— (Note: "From the D 2 the LBC" did not enter the NZ Top 40 Singles Chart, but peaked at number seven on the NZ Hot Singles Chart.)	—	66	51	54		Curtain Call 2
"Houdini"	2024	2	1	1	3	2	1	3	1	1	1	BPI: Platinum; BRMA: Platinum; BVMI: Gold; IFPI SWI: Platinum; MC: 3× Platinum; RMNZ: 2× Platinum	The Death of Slim Shady (Coup de Grâce)
"Tobey" (with Big Sean and BabyTron)	2024	24	29	21	65	43	25	74	31	29	23	MC: Gold	The Death of Slim Shady (Coup de Grâce)
"Somebody Save Me" (featuring Jelly Roll)	2024	27	48	22	—	60	31	— (Note: "Somebody Save Me" did not enter the Swedish Singellista Chart, but peaked at number six on the Swedish Heatseeker Chart.)	—	— (Note: "Somebody Save Me" did not enter the UK Singles Chart, but peaked at number 32 on the UK Singles Downloads Chart, and number 10 on the UK Hip Hop and R&B Singles Chart.)	31	BPI: Silver; MC: Gold; RMNZ: Gold	The Death of Slim Shady (Coup de Grâce)
"—" denotes a recording that did not chart or was not released in that territory.

== As featured artist ==
List of singles as featured artist, with selected chart positions and certifications, showing year released and album name
Title	Year	Peak chart positions										Certifications	Album
Title	Year	US	AUS	BEL (FL)	CAN	GER	IRL	NZ	SWE	SWI	UK	Certifications	Album
"The Anthem" (Sway & King Tech featuring Eminem, RZA, Tech N9ne, Xzibit, Pharoahe Monch, Kool G Rap, Jayo Felony, Chino XL, KRS-One)	1999	—	—	—	—	—	—	—	—	—	—		This or That
"Dead Wrong" (The Notorious B.I.G. featuring Eminem)	1999	— (Note: "Dead Wrong" did not enter the Billboard Hot 100, but peaked at number 15 on the Bubbling Under Hot 100 Singles chart.)	—	—	—	—	—	—	—	—	—		Born Again
"Forgot About Dre" (Dr. Dre featuring Eminem)	2000	25	—	—	48	41	20	26	29	37	7	BPI: 3× Platinum; BVMI: Gold; RMNZ: 6× Platinum	2001
"Rock City" (Royce da 5'9" featuring Eminem)	2002	—	—	45	—	30	—	—	—	37	—		Rock City (Version 2.0)
"Welcome 2 Detroit" (Trick-Trick featuring Eminem)	2005	100	—	—	—	20	—	—	—	—	—	RIAA: Gold	The People vs.
"Smack That" (Akon featuring Eminem)	2006	2	2	1	4	5	1	1	3	3	1	RIAA: Diamond; ARIA: 7× Platinum; BPI: 3× Platinum; BRMA: Gold; BVMI: 3× Gold; GLF: Platinum; RMNZ: 6× Platinum	Konvicted
"Drop the World" (Lil Wayne featuring Eminem)	2009	18	56	—	24	—	43	—	—	—	51	RIAA: 5× Platinum; ARIA: Platinum; BPI: Gold; RMNZ: Gold	Rebirth
"That's All She Wrote" (T.I. featuring Eminem)	2010	18	—	—	46	—	—	—	—	—	158	BPI: Silver; RMNZ: Platinum	No Mercy
"I Need a Doctor" (Dr. Dre featuring Eminem and Skylar Grey)	2011	4	12	— (Note: "I Need a Doctor" did not enter the Flanders Ultratop 50, but peaked at number three on the Ultratip chart.)	8	25	14	23	56	33	8	RIAA: 2× Platinum; ARIA: 4× Platinum; BPI: Platinum; BVMI: Gold; RMNZ: Platinum	Non-album single
"Writer's Block" (Royce da 5'9" featuring Eminem)	2011	—	—	—	—	—	—	—	—	—	199		Success Is Certain
"Throw That" (Slaughterhouse featuring Eminem)	2012	98	—	—	69	—	—	—	—	—	—		Welcome to: Our House
"My Life" (50 Cent featuring Eminem and Adam Levine)	2012	27	28	— (Note: "My Life" did not enter the Flanders Ultratop 50, but peaked at number two on the Ultratip chart.)	14	52	6	34	—	68	2	RIAA: Gold; ARIA: Platinum; BPI: Silver; RMNZ: Gold	Non-album single
"C'mon Let Me Ride" (Skylar Grey featuring Eminem)	2012	—	—	— (Note: "C'mon Let Me Ride" did not enter the Flanders Ultratop 50, but peaked at number 47 on the Ultratip chart.)	84	—	—	22	—	—	—	RMNZ: Gold	Don't Look Down
"Calm Down" (Busta Rhymes featuring Eminem)	2014	94	—	—	65	—	—	—	—	—	63		Extinction Level Event 2: The Wrath of God
"Twerk Dat Pop That" (Trick Trick featuring Eminem and Royce da 5'9")	2014	—	—	—	—	—	—	—	—	—	—		Non-album single
"Best Friend" (Yelawolf featuring Eminem)	2015	— (Note: "Best Friend" did not enter the Billboard Hot 100, but peaked at number three on the Bubbling Under Hot 100 Singles chart.)	—	— (Note: "Best Friend" did not enter the Flanders Ultratop 50, but peaked at number 78 on the Ultratip chart.)	51	—	—	—	—	—	—	RIAA: Platinum; RMNZ: Platinum	Love Story
"Caterpillar" (Royce da 5'9" featuring Eminem and King Green)	2018	— (Note: "Caterpillar" did not enter the Billboard Hot 100, but peaked at number 13 on the Bubbling Under Hot 100 Singles chart.)	—	—	—	—	—	—	—	—	—		Book of Ryan
"Homicide" (Logic featuring Eminem)	2019	5	6	7	5	38	12	4	14	12	15	RIAA: 2× Platinum; BPI: Gold; RMNZ: 2× Platinum	Confessions of a Dangerous Mind
"Last One Standing" (Skylar Grey featuring Polo G, Mozzy and Eminem)	2021	78	—	—	38	84	—	— (Note: "Last One Standing" did not enter the NZ Top 40 Singles Chart, but peaked at number 2 on the NZ Hot Singles Chart.)	68	48	46	RIAA: Gold	Venom: Let There Be Carnage
"Realest" (Ez Mil featuring Eminem)	2023	— (Note: "Realest" did not enter the Billboard Hot 100, but peaked at number 25 on the Bubbling Under Hot 100 Singles chart.)	—	—	95	—	—	— (Note: "Realest" did not enter the NZ Top 40 Singles Chart, but peaked at number three on the NZ Hot Singles Chart.)	—	—	— (Note: "Realest" peaked at number 27 on the UK Official Singles Downloads Chart on August 11, 2023.)		DU4LI7Y: REDUX
"Lace It" (Juice Wrld featuring Eminem and Benny Blanco)	2023	85	—	—	55	—	—	— (Note: "Lace It" did not enter the NZ Top 40 Singles Chart, but peaked at number three on the NZ Hot Singles Chart.)	—	—	95		The Party Never Ends
"Murdergram Deux" (LL Cool J featuring Eminem)	2024	— (Note: "Murdergram Deux" did not enter the Billboard Hot 100, but peaked at number 45 on the Bubbling Under R&B/Hip-Hop Singles chart.)	—	—	96	—	—	— (Note: "Murdergram Deux" did not enter the NZ Top 40 Singles Chart, but peaked at number 25 on the NZ Hot Singles Chart.)	—	—	— (Note: "Murdergram Deux" did not enter the UK Singles Chart Top 100, but debuted and peaked at number 37 on the UK Singles Downloads Chart.)		The FORCE
"Madara" (Ez Mil featuring Eminem)	2026	—	—	—	—	—	—	— (Note: "Madara" did not enter the NZ Top 40 Singles Chart, but peaked at number 28 on the NZ Hot Singles Chart.)	—	—	—		Non-album single
"Welcome" (IDK featuring Eminem)	2026	—	—	—	—	—	—	— (Note: "Welcome" did not enter the NZ Top 40 Singles Chart, but peaked at number 2 on the NZ Hot Singles Chart.)	—	—	—		TBA
"—" denotes a recording that did not chart or was not released in that territory.

== Promotional singles ==
List of songs, with selected chart positions and certifications, showing year released and album name
Title	Year	Peak chart positions										Certifications	Album
Title	Year	US	AUS	CAN	FRA	GER	IRL	NZ	SWE	SWI	UK	Certifications	Album
"Any Man"	1999	—	—	—	—	—	—	—	—	—	—		Soundbombing II
"Bitch Please II" (featuring Dr. Dre, Snoop Dogg, Nate Dogg and Xzibit)	2001	—	—	—	—	—	—	—	—	—	—	RIAA: Gold; ARIA: Platinum; BPI: Silver; RMNZ: Platinum	The Marshall Mathers LP
"Kill You"	2001	— (Note: "Kill You" did not enter the Billboard Hot 100, but peaked at number two on the Bubbling Under R&B/Hip-Hop Singles chart.)	—	—	—	—	—	—	—	—	—	RIAA: Gold; ARIA: Platinum; BPI: Gold; RMNZ: Platinum	The Marshall Mathers LP
"8 Mile"	2003	— (Note: "8 Mile" did not enter the Billboard Hot 100, but peaked at number two on the Bubbling Under Hot 100 Singles chart.)	—	—	—	—	—	—	—	—	—	RIAA: Gold; ARIA: Gold	8 Mile: Music from and Inspired by the Motion Picture
"Shit Hits the Fan" (Obie Trice featuring Dr. Dre and Eminem)	2003	—	—	—	—	—	—	—	—	—	—		Cheers
"One Day at a Time (Em's Version)" (with 2Pac featuring Outlawz)	2004	80	—	—	—	—	—	—	—	—	—		Tupac: Resurrection
"Warrior, Pt. 2" (Lloyd Banks featuring Eminem, 50 Cent and Nate Dogg)	2004	—	—	—	—	—	—	—	—	—	—		The Hunger for More
"Mosh"	2004	— (Note: "Mosh" did not enter the Billboard Hot 100, but peaked at number 12 on the Bubbling Under R&B/Hip-Hop Singles chart.)	—	—	—	—	—	—	—	—	—		Encore
"Hell Breaks Loose" (featuring Dr. Dre)	2009	29	—	21	—	—	—	—	—	—	—		Relapse: Refill
"Elevator"	2009	67	—	59	—	—	—	—	—	—	—		Relapse: Refill
"Roman's Revenge" (Nicki Minaj featuring Eminem)	2010	56	—	—	—	—	—	—	—	—	125	ARIA: Gold	Pink Friday
"The Hills" (Eminem Remix) (with the Weeknd)	2015	—	—	—	—	—	—	—	—	—	—		The Hills — The Remixes
"Infinite" (F.B.T Remix)	2016	97	—	—	—	—	—	—	—	—	—		Infinite
"Campaign Speech"	2016	— (Note: "Campaign Speech" did not enter the Billboard Hot 100, but peaked at number nine on the Bubbling Under R&B/Hip-Hop Singles chart.)	—	—	—	—	—	—	—	—	—		Non-album single
"Revenge" (Pink featuring Eminem)	2017	— (Note: "Revenge" did not enter the Billboard Hot 100, but peaked at number one on the Bubbling Under Hot 100 Singles chart.)	21	63	—	84	55	30	79	40	33	ARIA: Platinum; BPI: Silver; MC: Gold; RMNZ: Platinum	Beautiful Trauma
"Untouchable"	2017	86	100	52	150	88	60	— (Note: "Untouchable" did not enter the NZ Top 40 Singles Chart, but peaked at number two on the NZ Heatseekers Chart.)	— (Note: "Untouchable" did not enter the Swedish Singles Chart, but peaked at number seven on the Swedish Heatseekers chart.)	70	73		Revival
"Chloraseptic (Remix)" (featuring 2 Chainz and Phresher)	2018	—	—	89	—	—	—	—	—	—	—		Non-album single
"Remember the Name" (Ed Sheeran featuring Eminem and 50 Cent)	2019	57	15	20	145	29	4	10	20	—	—	BPI: Gold; MC: Platinum; RMNZ: Platinum	No.6 Collaborations Project
"Fuel (Shady Edition)" (with Westside Boogie and Grip)	2024	—	—	—	—	—	—	— (Note: "Fuel (Shady Edition)" did not enter the NZ Top 40 Singles Chart, but peaked at number nine on the NZ Hot Singles Chart.)	—	—	—		The Death of Slim Shady (Coup De Grâce)
"—" denotes a recording that did not chart or was not released in that territory.

== Other charted and certified songs ==
List of songs, with selected chart positions and certifications, showing year released and album name
Title	Year	Peak chart positions										Certifications	Album
Title	Year	US	AUS	CAN	FRA	GER	IRL	NZ	SWE	SWI	UK	Certifications	Album
"Infinite"	1996	97	—	—	—	—	—	—	—	—	—		Infinite
"What's the Difference" (Dr. Dre featuring Eminem and Xzibit)	1999	—	—	—	—	—	—	—	—	—	—	BPI: Platinum; BVMI: Gold; RMNZ: 2× Platinum	2001
"Marshall Mathers"	2000	—	—	—	—	—	—	—	—	—	—	ARIA: Gold	The Marshall Mathers LP
"Drug Ballad"	2000	—	—	—	—	—	—	—	—	—	—	ARIA: Gold	The Marshall Mathers LP
"Under the Influence" (featuring D12)	2000	—	—	—	—	—	—	—	—	—	—	ARIA: Gold; RMNZ: Gold	The Marshall Mathers LP
"Criminal"	2000	—	—	—	—	—	—	—	—	—	—	RIAA: Gold; ARIA: Gold; BPI: Silver; RMNZ: Gold	The Marshall Mathers LP
"Renegade" (Jay-Z featuring Eminem)	2001	—	—	—	—	—	—	—	—	—	—	RIAA: Gold; BPI: Silver; RMNZ: Gold	The Blueprint
"White America"	2002	—	—	—	—	—	—	—	—	—	—	RIAA: Platinum; ARIA: Platinum; BPI: Silver; RMNZ: Platinum	The Eminem Show
"Square Dance"	2002	—	—	—	—	—	—	—	—	—	—	ARIA: Gold; RMNZ: Gold	The Eminem Show
"Soldier"	2002	—	—	—	—	—	—	—	—	—	—	RIAA: Gold; ARIA: Gold; BPI: Silver; RMNZ: Gold	The Eminem Show
"Hailie's Song"	2002	— (Note: "Hailie's Song" did not enter the Billboard Hot 100, but peaked at number 13 on the Bubbling Under Hot 100 Singles chart. It did not enter the Hot R&B/Hip-Hop Songs chart, but peaked at number 10 on the Bubbling Under R&B/Hip-Hop Singles chart.)	—	—	—	—	—	—	—	—	112	RIAA: Gold; ARIA: Platinum; BPI: Silver; RMNZ: Platinum	The Eminem Show
"When the Music Stops" (featuring D12)	2002	—	—	—	—	—	—	—	—	—	—	ARIA: Gold	The Eminem Show
"Say What You Say" (featuring Dr. Dre)	2002	— (Note: "Say What You Say" did not enter the Billboard Hot 100, but peaked at number 10 on the Bubbling Under R&B/Hip-Hop Singles chart.)	—	—	—	—	—	—	—	—	—		The Eminem Show
"'Till I Collapse" (featuring Nate Dogg)	2002	—	92	—	—	99	77	—	— (Note: "'Till I Collapse" did not enter the Swedish Singles Chart, but peaked at number three on the Swedish Heatseekers chart.)	—	73	RIAA: 8× Platinum; ARIA: 9× Platinum; BPI: 3× Platinum; BVMI: 2× Platinum; RMNZ: 6× Platinum	The Eminem Show
"My Dad's Gone Crazy" (featuring Hailie Jade)	2002	—	—	—	—	—	—	—	—	—	—	RIAA: Gold; ARIA: Gold; RMNZ: Gold	The Eminem Show
"My Name" (Xzibit featuring Eminem and Nate Dogg)	2002	—	—	—	—	—	—	—	—	—	—	RMNZ: Gold	Man vs. Machine
"Patiently Waiting" (50 Cent featuring Eminem)	2003	—	—	—	—	—	—	—	—	—	—	RIAA: Platinum; BPI: Silver	Get Rich or Die Tryin'
"Go to Sleep" (Eminem featuring Obie Trice and DMX)	2003	—	—	—	—	—	—	—	—	—	—	ARIA: Gold; RMNZ: Gold	Cradle 2 the Grave (soundtrack)
"Hail Mary" (with 50 Cent and Busta Rhymes)	2003	— (Note: "Hail Mary" did not enter the Billboard Hot 100, but peaked at number 11 on the Bubbling Under Hot 100 Singles chart.)	—	—	—	—	—	—	—	—	—		Invasion Part II: Conspiracy Theory
"Never Enough" (featuring 50 Cent and Nate Dogg)	2004	—	—	—	—	—	—	—	—	—	—	ARIA: Gold; BPI: Silver; RMNZ: Gold	Encore
"Big Weenie"	2004	—	—	—	—	—	—	—	—	—	—	ARIA: Gold	Encore
"One Shot 2 Shot" (featuring D12)	2004	—	—	—	—	—	—	—	—	—	—	ARIA: Gold	Encore
"Fack"	2005	—	—	—	—	—	—	—	—	—	—	RIAA: Gold; ARIA: Gold; BPI: Silver; RMNZ: Gold	Curtain Call: The Hits
"The Re-Up" (with 50 Cent)	2006	— (Note: "The Re-Up" did not enter the Billboard Hot 100, but peaked at number 19 on the Bubbling Under Hot 100 Singles chart.)	—	—	—	—	—	—	—	—	—		Eminem Presents: The Re-Up
"No Apologies"	2006	— (Note: "No Apologies" did not enter the Billboard Hot 100, but peaked at number 21 on the Bubbling Under Hot 100 Singles chart.)	—	—	—	—	—	—	—	—	—		Eminem Presents: The Re-Up
"Touchdown" (T.I. featuring Eminem)	2007	— (Note: "Touchdown" did not enter the Billboard Hot 100, but peaked at number nine on the Bubbling Under Hot 100 Singles chart.)	68	—	—	—	—	—	—	—	—		T.I. vs. T.I.P.
"Peep Show" (50 Cent featuring Eminem)	2007	— (Note: "Peep Show" did not enter the Billboard Hot 100, but peaked at number 16 on the Bubbling Under Hot 100 Singles chart.)	—	—	—	—	—	—	—	—	—		Curtis
"Dr. West" (skit)	2009	— (Note: "Dr. West (skit)" did not enter the Billboard Hot 100, but peaked at number five on the Bubbling Under Hot 100 Singles chart.)	—	—	—	—	—	—	—	—			Relapse
"My Mom"	2009	—	—	—	—	—	—	—	—	—	166	ARIA: Gold; RMNZ: Gold	Relapse
"Insane"	2009	85	—	—	—	—	—	—	—	—	182	ARIA: Gold	Relapse
"Bagpipes from Baghdad"	2009	—	—	—	—	—	—	—	—	—	187	RMNZ: Gold	Relapse
"Must Be the Ganja"	2009	—	—	—	—	—	—	—	—	—	—	RMNZ: Gold	Relapse
"Careful What You Wish For"	2009	— (Note: "Careful What You Wish For" did not enter the Billboard Hot 100, but peaked at number 25 on the Bubbling Under Hot 100 Singles chart.)	—	—	—	—	—	—	—	—	—		Relapse
"Buffalo Bill"	2009	— (Note: "Buffalo Bill" did not enter the Billboard Hot 100, but peaked at number 17 on the Bubbling Under Hot 100 Singles chart.)	—	—	—	—	—	—	—	—	—		Relapse: Refill
"Taking My Ball"	2009	— (Note: "Taking My Ball" did not enter the Billboard Hot 100, but peaked at number 23 on the Bubbling Under Hot 100 Singles chart.)	—	—	—	—	—	—	—	—	—		Relapse: Refill
"Music Box"	2009	82	—	63	—	—	—	—	—	—	—		Relapse: Refill
"Drop the Bomb on 'Em"	2009	— (Note: "Drop the Bomb on 'Em" did not enter the Billboard Hot 100, but peaked at number three on the Bubbling Under Hot 100 Singles chart.)	—	83	—	—	—	—	—	—	—		Relapse: Refill
"The Warning"	2009	— (Note: "The Warning" did not enter the Billboard Hot 100, but peaked at number eight on the Bubbling Under R&B/Hip-Hop Singles chart.)	—	23	—	—	—	—	—	—	—		Non-album single
"Airplanes, Part II" (B.o.B featuring Eminem and Hayley Williams)	2010	—	—	—	—	—	—	—	—	—	—	RMNZ: Gold	B.o.B Presents: The Adventures of Bobby Ray
"Cold Wind Blows"	2010	71	—	—	—	—	—	—	—	—	—	RIAA: Gold; ARIA: Gold; RMNZ: Gold	Recovery
"Talkin' 2 Myself" (featuring Kobe)	2010	88	—	97	—	—	—	—	—	—	148	RIAA: Gold; ARIA: Gold	Recovery
"Won't Back Down" (featuring Pink)	2010	62	87	65	—	—	—	—	—	—	82	RIAA: Platinum; ARIA: Gold; BPI: Silver	Recovery
"W.T.P."	2010	—	—	—	—	—	—	—	—	—	—	RIAA: Gold; ARIA: Gold; RMNZ: Gold	Recovery
"Going Through Changes"	2010	—	—	—	—	—	—	—	—	—	—	RIAA: Gold; ARIA: Gold	Recovery
"Cinderella Man"	2010	— (Note: "Cinderella Man" did not enter the Billboard Hot 100, but peaked at number 11 on the Bubbling Under Hot 100 Singles chart.)	—	—	—	—	—	—	—	—	—	RIAA: 2× Platinum; ARIA: 2× Platinum; BPI: Gold; RMNZ: Platinum	Recovery
"25 to Life"	2010	92	—	90	—	—	—	—	—	—	—	RIAA: Platinum; ARIA: Platinum; BPI: Silver; RMNZ: Gold	Recovery
"So Bad"	2010	—	—	—	—	—	—	—	—	—	—	RIAA: Gold; ARIA: Gold	Recovery
"Almost Famous"	2010	—	—	—	—	—	—	—	—	—	—	RIAA: Gold	Recovery
"Love the Way You Lie (Part II)" (Rihanna featuring Eminem)	2010	—	—	19	—	—	—	—	—	—	160	RIAA: Gold; ARIA: Platinum; BPI: Gold; RMNZ: Gold	Loud
"Numb" (Rihanna featuring Eminem)	2012	—	—	99	128	—	—	—	—	—	92		Unapologetic
"Bad Guy"	2013	— (Note: "Bad Guy" did not enter the Billboard Hot 100, but peaked at number nine on the Bubbling Under Hot 100 Singles chart.)	—	—	—	—	—	—	—	—	138	RIAA: Gold; ARIA: Gold	The Marshall Mathers LP 2
"Rhyme or Reason"	2013	— (Note: "Rhyme or Reason" did not enter the Billboard Hot 100, but peaked at number 13 on the Bubbling Under Hot 100 Singles chart.)	—	—	—	—	—	—	—	—	—		The Marshall Mathers LP 2
"Legacy"	2013	— (Note: "Legacy" did not enter the Billboard Hot 100, but peaked at number 18 on the Bubbling Under Hot 100 Singles chart.)	—	—	163	—	—	—	—	—	199	RIAA: Gold; ARIA: Gold; BPI: Silver; RMNZ: Gold	The Marshall Mathers LP 2
"Asshole" (featuring Skylar Grey)	2013	—	—	—	—	—	—	—	—	—	—	RMNZ: Gold	The Marshall Mathers LP 2
"Stronger Than I Was"	2013	—	—	—	—	—	—	—	—	—	198		The Marshall Mathers LP 2
"Love Game" (featuring Kendrick Lamar)	2013	—	—	—	152	—	—	—	—	—	94	RMNZ: Gold	The Marshall Mathers LP 2
"Desperation" (featuring Jamie N Commons)	2013	—	—	—	—	—	—	—	—	—	172		The Marshall Mathers LP 2
"Beautiful Pain" (featuring Sia)	2013	99	—	59	114	87	—	15	—	—	67	RIAA: Gold; ARIA: Gold; BPI: Silver; RMNZ: Platinum	The Marshall Mathers LP 2
"Wicked Ways" (featuring X Ambassadors)	2013	—	—	—	—	—	—	—	—	—	197		The Marshall Mathers LP 2
"Medicine Man" (Dr. Dre featuring Eminem, Candice Pillay and Anderson .Paak)	2015	— (Note: "Medicine Man" did not enter the Billboard Hot 100, but peaked at number 21 on the Bubbling Under Hot 100 Singles chart.)	—	—	121	—	—	—	—	—	—		Compton
"No Favors" (Big Sean featuring Eminem)	2017	22	77	34	106	—	—	—	—	55	56	RIAA: Platinum	I Decided.
"Believe"	2017	92	73	48	80	41	38	— (Note: "Believe" did not enter the NZ Top 40 Singles Chart, but peaked at number one on the NZ Heatseeker Singles Chart.)	69	—	—	ARIA: Gold	Revival
"Like Home" (featuring Alicia Keys)	2017	— (Note: "Like Home" did not enter the Billboard Hot 100, but peaked at number four on the Bubbling Under Hot 100 Singles chart.)	77	57	125	52	39	— (Note: "Like Home" did not enter the NZ Top 40 Singles Chart, but peaked at number two on the NZ Heatseeker Singles Chart.)	62	—	84		Revival
"Bad Husband" (featuring X Ambassadors)	2017	— (Note: "Bad Husband" did not enter the Billboard Hot 100, but peaked at number 15 on the Bubbling Under Hot 100 Singles chart.)	94	68	167	69	44	—	70	—	—		Revival
"Tragic Endings" (featuring Skylar Grey)	2017	— (Note: "Tragic Endings" did not enter the Billboard Hot 100, but peaked at number 17 on the Bubbling Under Hot 100 Singles chart.)	87	75	193	77	52	—	92	—	—		Revival
"Revival (Interlude)"	2017	—	—	—	—	—	63	—	— (Note: "Revival (Interlude)" did not enter the Swedish Singellista chart, but peaked at number eight on the Swedish Heatseeker chart.)	—			Revival
"In Your Head"	2017	—	—	97	—	—	19	—	— (Note: "In Your Head" did not enter the Swedish Singellista chart, but peaked at number 14 on the Swedish Heatseeker chart.)	—	19	ARIA: Gold	Revival
"Chloraseptic" (featuring Phresher)	2017	— (Note: "Chloraseptic" did not enter the Billboard Hot 100, but peaked at number 18 on the Bubbling Under Hot 100 chart.)	—	89	164	100	64	—	— (Note: "Chloraseptic" did not enter the Swedish Singellista chart, but peaked at number 15 on the Swedish Heatseeker chart.)	—	—		Revival
"Need Me" (featuring Pink)	2017	—	98	98	—	—	—	—	— (Note: "Need Me" did not enter the Swedish Singellista chart, but peaked at number 16 on the Swedish Heatseeker chart.)	—	—		Revival
"Framed"	2017	—	—	—	—	—	80	—	—	—	—		Revival
"Castle"	2017	—	—	—	—	—	76	—	—	—	—		Revival
"Arose"	2017	—	—	—	—	—	82	—	—	—	—		Revival
"Heat"	2017	—	—	—	—	—	84	—	—	—	—		Revival
"Offended"	2017	—	—	—	—	—	91	—	—	—	—		Revival
"Majesty" (Nicki Minaj and Labrinth featuring Eminem)	2018	58	60	44	—	—	50	—	—	—	41	ARIA: Gold	Queen
"The Ringer"	2018	8	5	5	36	21	6	2	8	3	4	RIAA: Platinum; ARIA: Platinum; BPI: Gold; MC: Platinum; RMNZ: Platinum	Kamikaze
"Greatest"	2018	23	15	16	59	40	11	12	28	—	—	RIAA: Gold; ARIA: Platinum; BPI: Silver; RMNZ: Gold	Kamikaze
"Normal"	2018	39	33	27	83	71	—	—	53	—	—	RIAA: Gold; ARIA: Gold	Kamikaze
"Em Calls Paul" (Skit)	2018	—	—	—	156	—	—	—	88	—	—		Kamikaze
"Stepping Stone"	2018	42	34	30	95	69	—	—	52	—	—	ARIA: Gold; RMNZ: Gold	Kamikaze
"Not Alike" (featuring Royce da 5'9")	2018	24	23	18	77	57	—	20	42	—	—	RIAA: Gold; ARIA: Platinum; BPI: Silver; RMNZ: Gold	Kamikaze
"Kamikaze"	2018	16	13	9	94	53	—	27	43	—	—	RIAA: Gold; ARIA: Platinum; BPI: Silver; RMNZ: Gold	Kamikaze
"Nice Guy" (with Jessie Reyez)	2018	65	48	53	168	—	—	—	82	—	—	ARIA: Gold	Kamikaze
"Good Guy" (featuring Jessie Reyez)	2018	67	46	41	143	98	—	—	59	—	—	RIAA: Gold; ARIA: Gold; BPI: Silver; RMNZ: Gold	Kamikaze
"Lord Above" (Fat Joe and Dre featuring Eminem and Mary J. Blige)	2019	97	—	—	—	—	—	—	—	—	—		Family Ties
"Premonition" (Intro)	2020	67	61	47	158	—	—	—	— (Note: "Premonition (Intro)" did not enter the Swedish Singellista Chart, but peaked at number one on the Swedish Heatseeker Chart.)	—	—		Music to Be Murdered By
"Unaccommodating" (featuring Young M.A)	2020	36	34	25	105	—	—	37	71	—	—	RIAA: Gold; ARIA: Gold	Music to Be Murdered By
"You Gon' Learn" (featuring Royce da 5'9" and White Gold)	2020	52	36	32	100	—	—	—	65	—	—	RIAA: Gold; ARIA: Gold; BPI: Silver; RMNZ: Gold	Music to Be Murdered By
"Alfred" (Interlude)	2020	— (Note: "Alfred" (Interlude) did not enter the Billboard Hot 100, but peaked at number 16 on the Bubbling Under Hot 100 chart.)	—	84	—	—	—	—	— (Note: "Alfred (Interlude)" did not enter the Swedish Singellista Chart, but peaked at number 17 on the Swedish Heatseeker Chart.)	—	—		Music to Be Murdered By
"Those Kinda Nights" (featuring Ed Sheeran)	2020	31	25	—	22	—	20	30	20	12	12	RIAA: Gold; ARIA: Gold; BPI: Silver; RMNZ: Gold	Music to Be Murdered By
"In Too Deep"	2020	71	56	45	165	—	—	—	100	—	—		Music to Be Murdered By
"Leaving Heaven" (featuring Skylar Grey)	2020	61	53	38	131	—	—	—	86	—	—	ARIA: Gold	Music to Be Murdered By
"Yah Yah" (featuring Royce da 5'9", Black Thought, Q-Tip and Denaun)	2020	— (Note: "Yah Yah" did not enter the Billboard Hot 100, but peaked at number three on the Bubbling Under Hot 100 chart.)	79	73	—	—	—	—	— (Note: "Yah Yah" did not enter the Swedish Singellista Chart, but peaked at number 11 on the Swedish Heatseeker Chart.)	—	—		Music to Be Murdered By
"Stepdad"	2020	93	70	58	—	—	—	—	— (Note: "Stepdad" did not enter the Swedish Singellista Chart, but peaked at number two on the Swedish Heatseeker Chart.)	—	—		Music to Be Murdered By
"Marsh"	2020	83	75	51	—	—	—	—	— (Note: "Marsh" did not enter the Swedish Singellista Chart, but peaked at number five on the Swedish Heatseeker Chart.)	—	—		Music to Be Murdered By
"Never Love Again"	2020	— (Note: "Never Love Again" did not enter the Billboard Hot 100, but peaked at number one on the Bubbling Under Hot 100 chart.)	90	62	—	—	—	—	— (Note: "Never Love Again" did not enter the Swedish Singellista Chart, but peaked at number nine on the Swedish Heatseeker Chart.)	—	—		Music to Be Murdered By
"Little Engine"	2020	— (Note: "Little Engine" did not enter the Billboard Hot 100, but peaked at number five on the Bubbling Under Hot 100 chart.)	—	68	—	—	—	—	—	—	—		Music to Be Murdered By
"Lock It Up" (featuring Anderson .Paak)	2020	89	66	59	—	—	—	—	— (Note: "Lock It Up" did not enter the Swedish Singellista Chart, but peaked at number seven on the Swedish Heatseeker Chart.)	—	—	ARIA: Gold; RMNZ: Gold	Music to Be Murdered By
"Farewell"	2020	— (Note: "Farewell" did not enter the Billboard Hot 100, but peaked at number two on the Bubbling Under Hot 100 chart.)	89	60	—	—	—	—	— (Note: "Farewell" did not enter the Swedish Singellista Chart, but peaked at number eight on the Swedish Heatseeker Chart.)	—	—		Music to Be Murdered By
"No Regrets" (featuring Don Toliver)	2020	84	76	53	—	—	—	—	— (Note: "No Regrets" did not enter the Swedish Singellista Chart, but peaked at number six on the Swedish Heatseeker Chart.)	—	—		Music to Be Murdered By
"I Will" (featuring Kxng Crooked, Royce da 5'9" and Joell Ortiz)	2020	— (Note: "I Will" did not enter the Billboard Hot 100, but peaked at number 15 on the Bubbling Under Hot 100 chart.)	—	82	—	—	—	—	—	—	—		Music to Be Murdered By
"Coffin" (Jessie Reyez featuring Eminem)	2020	—	—	98	—	—	—	— (Note: "Coffin" did not enter the NZ Top 40 Singles Chart, but peaked at number one on the NZ Hot Singles Chart.)	—	—	—	MC: Gold	Before Love Came to Kill Us
"Black Magic" (featuring Skylar Grey)	2020	— (Note: "Black Magic" did not enter the Billboard Hot 100, but peaked at number six on the Bubbling Under Hot 100 chart.)	—	77	—	—	—	— (Note: "Black Magic" did not enter the NZ Top 40 Singles Chart, but peaked at number seven on the NZ Hot Singles Chart.)	—	—	100		Music to Be Murdered By – Side B
"Alfred's Theme"	2020	—	—	85	—	—	—	—	—	—	—		Music to Be Murdered By – Side B
"Tone Deaf"	2020	— (Note: "Tone Deaf" did not enter the Billboard Hot 100, but peaked at number 20 on the Bubbling Under Hot 100 chart.)	—	96	—	—	—	—	—	—	—		Music to Be Murdered By – Side B
"Book of Rhymes" (featuring DJ Premier)	2020	— (Note: "Book of Rhymes" did not enter the Billboard Hot 100, but peaked at number 12 on the Bubbling Under Hot 100 chart.)	—	86	—	—	—	—	—	—	—		Music to Be Murdered By – Side B
"Guns Blazing" (featuring Dr. Dre and Sly Pyper)	2020	—	—	92	—	—	—	— (Note: "Guns Blazing" did not enter the NZ Top 40 Singles Chart, but peaked at number nine on the NZ Hot Singles Chart.)	—	—	—		Music to Be Murdered By – Side B
"Higher"	2020	—	—	—	—	—	—	—	—	—	—	ARIA: Gold	Music to Be Murdered By – Side B
"Zeus" (featuring White Gold)	2020	— (Note: "Zeus" did not enter the Billboard Hot 100, but peaked at number three on the Bubbling Under Hot 100 chart.)	—	70	—	—	—	— (Note: "Zeus" did not enter the NZ Top 40 Singles Chart, but peaked at number eight on the NZ Hot Singles Chart.)	—	—	—		Music to Be Murdered By – Side B
"EPMD 2" (Nas featuring Eminem and EPMD)	2021	79	—	81	—	—	—	—	—	—	—		King's Disease II
"Parables" (Remix) (Cordae featuring Eminem)	2022	—	—	—	—	—	—	— (Note: "Parables" (Remix) did not enter the NZ Top 40 Singles Chart, but peaked at number 31 on the NZ Hot Singles Chart.)	—	—	—		From a Birds Eye View
"Is This Love ('09)" (featuring 50 Cent)	2022	—	—	74	—	—	—	— (Note: "Is This Love ('09)" did not enter the NZ Top 40 Singles Chart, but peaked at number six on the NZ Hot Singles Chart.)	—	—	—		Curtain Call 2
"Use This Gospel" (Remix) (DJ Khaled featuring Kanye West and Eminem)	2022	49	—	55	—	—	—	— (Note: "Use This Gospel" (Remix) did not enter the NZ Top 40 Singles Chart, but peaked at number 15 on the NZ Hot Singles Chart.)	—	—	—	RIAA: Gold	God Did
"Renaissance"	2024	20	18	14	—	—	18	15	72	—	13	MC: Gold	The Death of Slim Shady (Coup de Grâce)
"Habits" (featuring White Gold)	2024	19	17	13	—	—	17	14	68	—	11	MC: Gold	The Death of Slim Shady (Coup de Grâce)
"Trouble"	2024	31	35	26	—	—	—	23	— (Note: "Trouble" did not enter the Swedish Singellista Chart, but peaked at number 2 on the Swedish Heatseeker Chart.)	—	— (Note: "Trouble" did not enter the UK Singles Chart but debuted and peaked at number 7 on the UK Hip Hop and R&B Singles Chart.)		The Death of Slim Shady (Coup de Grâce)
"Brand New Dance"	2024	25	21	17	—	—	61	18	92	—	38	MC: Gold	The Death of Slim Shady (Coup de Grâce)
"Evil"	2024	30	32	25	—	—	—	22	— (Note: "Evil" did not enter the Swedish Singellista Chart, but peaked at number 3 on the Swedish Heatseeker Chart.)	—	— (Note: "Evil" did not enter the UK Singles Chart but debuted and peaked at number 6 on the UK Hip Hop and R&B Singles Chart.)		The Death of Slim Shady (Coup de Grâce)
"Lucifer" (featuring Sly Pyper)	2024	37	36	29	—	—	—	20	— (Note: "Lucifer" did not enter the Swedish Singellista Chart, but peaked at number 8 on the Swedish Heatseeker Chart.)	—	— (Note: "Lucifer" did not enter the UK Singles Chart but debuted and peaked at number 9 on the UK Hip Hop and R&B Singles Chart.)		The Death of Slim Shady (Coup de Grâce)
"Antichrist" (featuring Bizarre)	2024	39	38	30	—	—	—	26	— (Note: "Antichrist" did not enter the Swedish Singellista Chart, but peaked at number 17 on the Swedish Heatseeker Chart.)	—	— (Note: "Antichrist" did not enter the UK Singles Chart but debuted and peaked at number 13 on the UK Hip Hop and R&B Singles Chart.)		The Death of Slim Shady (Coup de Grâce)
"Fuel" (featuring JID)	2024	21	28	24	—	—	—	19	— (Note: "Fuel" did not enter the Swedish Singellista Chart, but peaked at number 7 on the Swedish Heatseeker Chart.)	—	78	RMNZ: Gold	The Death of Slim Shady (Coup de Grâce)
"Road Rage" (featuring Dem Jointz and Sly Piper)	2024	59	56	37	—	—	—	—	—	—	— (Note: "Road Rage" did not enter the UK Singles Chart but debuted and peaked at number 18 on the UK Hip Hop and R&B Singles Chart.)		The Death of Slim Shady (Coup de Grâce)
"Breaking News" (skit)	2024	—	90	—	—	—	—	—	—	—	— (Note: "Breaking News - Skit" did not enter the UK Singles Chart but debuted and peaked at number 23 on the UK Hip Hop and R&B Singles Chart.)		The Death of Slim Shady (Coup de Grâce)
"Guilty Conscience 2"	2024	45	46	31	—	—	—	32	—	—	— (Note: "Guilty Conscience 2" did not enter the UK Singles Chart but debuted and peaked at number 14 on the UK Hip Hop and R&B Singles Chart.)		The Death of Slim Shady (Coup de Grâce)
"Head Honcho" (featuring Ez Mil)	2024	72	72	48	—	—	—	—	—	—	— (Note: "Head Honcho" did not enter the UK Singles Chart but debuted and peaked at number 21 on the UK Hip Hop and R&B Singles Chart.)		The Death of Slim Shady (Coup de Grâce)
"Temporary" (featuring Skylar Grey)	2024	56	49	36	—	—	—	33	—	—	— (Note: "Temporary" did not enter the UK Singles Chart but debuted and peaked at number 14 on the UK Hip Hop and R&B Singles Chart, and number 41 on the UK Singles Downloads Chart Top 100.)		The Death of Slim Shady (Coup de Grâce)
"Bad One" (featuring White Gold)	2024	69	77	43	—	—	—	—	—	—	— (Note: "Bad One" did not enter the UK Singles Chart but debuted and peaked at number 22 on the UK Hip Hop and R&B Singles Chart.)		The Death of Slim Shady (Coup de Grâce)
"Guess Who's Back" (skit)	2024	—	—	—	—	—	—	—	—	—	— (Note: "Guess Who's Back" (skit) did not enter the UK Singles Chart but debuted and peaked at number 25 on the UK Hip Hop and R&B Singles Chart.)		The Death of Slim Shady (Coup de Grâce)
"Like My Shit"	2024	—	—	—	—	—	—	— (Note: "Like My Shit" did not enter the NZ Top 40 Singles Chart, but peaked at number 28 on the NZ Hot Singles Chart.)	—	—	—		The Death of Slim Shady (Coup de Grâce)
"Kyrie & Luka" (with 2 Chainz)	2024	—	—	—	—	—	—	— (Note: "Kyrie & Luka" did not enter the NZ Top 40 Singles Chart, but peaked at number 24 on the NZ Hot Singles Chart.)	—	—	—		The Death of Slim Shady (Coup de Grâce)
"Everybody's Looking at Me"	2025	—	—	90	—	—	—	— (Note: "Everybody's Looking at Me" did not enter the NZ Top 40 Singles Chart, but peaked at number 13 on the NZ Hot Singles Chart.)	—	—	—		Stans (The Official Soundtrack)
"—" denotes a recording that did not chart or was not released in that territory.

== Guest appearances ==
List of non-single guest appearances, with other performing artists, showing year released and album name
Title	Year	Other performer(s)	Album
"Take the Whole World with Me"	1997	Outsidaz, Bizarre	—N/a
"Hard Act to Follow" [Unreleased]	1998	Outsidaz	—N/a
"When to Stand Up" [Unreleased]	1998	DJ Jazzy Jeff, Pauly Jams	—N/a
"Trife Thieves"	1998	Bizarre, Fuzz Scoota	Attack of the Weirdos
"Fuck Off"	1998	Kid Rock	Devil Without a Cause
"5 Star Generals"	1998	Shabaam Sahdeeq, Skam, A.L., Kwest Tha Madd Lad	Sound Clash/5 Star Generals
"3hree6ix5ive"	1998	Skam	Shyhalüde and Restaurant: ... It Ain't Always on the Menu
"We Shine"	1998	Da Ruckus	Episode 1 EP
"Flawless Victory"	1998	Da Rabeez	Private Circle
"Green and Gold"	1998	The Anonymous	Green & Gold
"Hustlers & Hardcore"	1999	Domingo	Behind the Doors of the 13th Floor
"Watch Deez"	1999	Thirstin Howl III, DJ Spinna	Heavy Beats Volume 1, Skillosopher / Skilligan's Island
"Get You Mad"	1999	Sway & King Tech	This or That
"Bad Guys Always Die"	1999	Dr. Dre	Wild Wild West (soundtrack)
"Busa Rhyme"	1999	Missy Elliott	Da Real World
"Macosa" [Unreleased]	1999	Outsidaz	—N/a
"Turn Me Loose" [Unreleased]	1999	Limp Bizkit	—N/a
"Till Hell Freezes Over" [Slim Shady LP leftover]	1999	—N/a	Detroit Underground 2000 Volume II
"Desperados"	1999	DJ Butter, Bugz, Proof, Almighty Dreadnaughtz	Detroit Underground 2000 Volume II
"The Last Hit"	1999	The High & Mighty	Home Field Advantage
"Bad Influence"	1999	—N/a	End of Days (soundtrack)
"Stir Crazy"	1999	The Madd Rapper	Tell 'Em Why U Madd
"The Watcher" {background vocals}	1999	Dr. Dre, Knoc-turn'al	2001
"What's the Difference?"	1999	Dr. Dre, Xzibit	2001
"Murder, Murder" (Remix)	1999	—N/a	Next Friday (soundtrack)
"If I Get Locked Up"	1999	Funkmaster Flex, Big Kap, Dr. Dre	The Tunnel
"Rush Ya Clique"	2000	Outsidaz	Night Life
"Off the Wall"	2000	Redman	Nutty Professor II: The Klumps (soundtrack)
"Don't Approach Me"	2000	Xzibit	Restless
"What the Beat"	2001	Method Man, Royce da 5'9", DJ Clue	The Professional, Pt. 2
"What If I Was White"	2001	Sticky Fingaz	Blacktrash: The Autobiography of Kirk Jones/Down to Earth (soundtrack)
"Renegade"	2001	Jay-Z	The Blueprint
"Rabbit Run"	2002	—N/a	8 Mile: Music from and Inspired by the Motion Picture
"My Name"	2002	Xzibit, Nate Dogg	Man Vs Machine
"Patiently Waiting"	2003	50 Cent	Get Rich or Die Tryin'
"Don't Push Me"	2003	50 Cent, Lloyd Banks	Get Rich or Die Tryin'
"Go to Sleep"	2003	DMX, Obie Trice	Cradle 2 the Grave (soundtrack)
"Lady"	2003	Obie Trice	Cheers
"We All Die One Day"	2003	Obie Trice, 50 Cent, Lloyd Banks, Tony Yayo	Cheers
"Hands on You"	2003	Obie Trice	Cheers
"911"	2003	Boo-Yaa T.R.I.B.E., B-Real	West Koasta Nostra
"Freestyle"	2003	DJ Kay Slay	The Streetsweeper, Vol. 1
"I'm Gone"	2004	DJ Kay Slay, Obie Trice	The Streetsweeper, Vol. 2: The Pain from the Game
"Welcome to D-Block"	2004	Jadakiss, Styles P, Sheek Louch	Kiss of Death
"Soldier Like Me"	2004	2Pac	Loyal to the Game
"Black Cotton"	2004	2Pac, Kastro, Young Noble	Loyal to the Game
"We Ain't"	2005	The Game	The Documentary
"GATman and Robbin"	2005	50 Cent	The Massacre
"Lean Back" (Remix)	2005	Fat Joe, Lil Jon, Mase, Remy Ma	All or Nothing
"Hip Hop"	2005	Bizarre	Hannicap Circus
"No More To Say"	2005	Trick-Trick, Proof	The People vs.
"Drama Setter"	2005	Obie Trice, Tony Yayo	Thoughts of a Predicate Felon
"It Has Been Said"	2005	The Notorious B.I.G., Obie Trice, Diddy	Duets: The Final Chapter
"There They Go"	2006	Obie Trice, Big Herk	Second Round's on Me
"We're Back"	2006	Obie Trice, Stat Quo, Bobby Creekwater, Ca$his	Eminem Presents: The Re-Up
"The Re-Up"	2006	50 Cent	Eminem Presents: The Re-Up
"Public Enemy #1"	2006	—N/a	Eminem Presents: The Re-Up
"No Apologies"	2006	—N/a	Eminem Presents: The Re-Up
"Peep Show"	2007	50 Cent	Curtis
"Touchdown"	2007	T.I.	T.I. vs. T.I.P.
"Pistol Poppin'"	2007	Cashis	The County Hound EP
"Who Want It"	2008	Trick Trick	The Villain
"Chemical Warfare"	2009	The Alchemist	Chemical Warfare
"Psycho"	2009	50 Cent	Before I Self Destruct
"Airplanes, Part 2"	2010	B.o.B., Hayley Williams	The Adventures of Bobby Ray
"Where I'm At"	2010	Lloyd Banks	H.F.M. 2 (The Hunger for More 2)
"Love the Way You Lie (Part II)"	2010	Rihanna	Loud
"Things Get Worse"	2011	B.o.B	E.P.I.C. (Every Play Is Crucial)
"Throw It Up"	2011	Yelawolf, Gangsta Boo	Radioactive
"Richard"	2012	Obie Trice	Bottoms Up
"Numb"	2012	Rihanna	Unapologetic
"Our House"	2012	Slaughterhouse, Skylar Grey	Welcome to: Our House
"Asylum"	2012	Slaughterhouse	Welcome to: Our House
"Here Comes the Weekend"	2012	P!nk	The Truth About Love
"Symphony in H"	2013	Tony Touch	The Piece Maker 3: Return of the 50 MC's
"The Intro and Em"	2015	D12	The Devil's Night Mixtape
"Speedom (Worldwide Choppers 2)"	2015	Tech N9ne, Krizz Kaliko	Special Effects
"Medicine Man"	2015	Dr. Dre, Anderson .Paak, Candice Pillay	Compton
"Kill For You"	2016	Skylar Grey	Natural Causes
"Welcome to Planet X (We're Coming for You)"	2016	KXNG Crooked	Good vs. Evil
"No Favors"	2017	Big Sean	I Decided.
"Majesty"	2018	Nicki Minaj, Labrinth	Queen
"Rainy Days"	2019	Boogie	Everythings for Sale
"Bang"	2019	Conway The Machine	—N/a
"Lord Above"	2019	Fat Joe, Dre, Mary J. Blige	Family Ties
"Bang (Remix)"	2019	Griselda	W.W.C.D. (What Would Chine Gun Do?)
"Coffin"	2020	Jessie Reyez	Before Love Came to Kill Us
"Perspective (Skit)"	2020	Royce da 5'9"	The Allegory
"Friday Night Cypher"	2020	Big Sean, Tee Grizzley, Kash Doll, Cash Kidd, Payroll, 42 Dugg, Boldy James, Drego, Sada Baby, Royce da 5'9"	Detroit 2
"EPMD 2"	2021	Nas, EPMD	King's Disease II
"Walkthrough!"	2021	Grip	I Died for This!?
"Eminem Speaks"	2021	Juice Wrld	Fighting Demons
"Gospel"	2021	Dr. Dre, The D.O.C.	GTA Online: The Contract
"Parables (Remix)"	2022	Cordae	From a Birds Eye View
"Use This Gospel" (Remix)	2022	DJ Khaled, Kanye West	God Did
"Doomsday Pt. 2"	2024	Lyrical Lemonade	All Is Yellow
"Gunz N Smoke"	2024	Snoop Dogg, Dr. Dre, 50 Cent	Missionary
"Animals (Pt. 1)"	2025	JID	God Does Like Ugly (The Preluxe)
"God Speak (Interlude)"	2026	Jay-Z	The Godbody LP
"Heal My Faith"	2026	Kid Rock	Halfway 2 Jesus

== See also ==
- Eminem albums discography
- Eminem production discography
- Bad Meets Evil discography
- D12 discography
