= Black Magic (Eminem song) =

2020 song by Eminem and Skylar Grey

Promotional single by Eminem featuring Skylar Grey

from the album Music to Be Murdered By – Side B
- Released: December 18, 2020
- Genre: Pop-rap; hip hop
- Length: 2:54
- Label: Shady; Aftermath; Interscope
- Songwriters: Marshall Mathers; Holly Brook Hafermann; Jayson DeZuzio; Elliott Taylor; Luis Resto
- Producers: Skylar Grey; Jayson DeZuzio

Eminem chronology
"Those Kinda Nights" (2020)	"Black Magic" (2020)	"Killer" (2021)

Skylar Grey singles chronology
"Make It Through the Day" (2020)	"Black Magic" (2020)	"Partly Cloudy with a Chance of Tears" (2021)

"Black Magic" is a song by American rapper Eminem from the deluxe edition of his eleventh studio album Music to Be Murdered By. It was released as the album's second track on December 18, 2020, via Shady Records along with the rest of Music to Be Murdered By – Side B. Written by Eminem, Skylar Grey, Jayson DeZuzio, Elliott Taylor and Luis Resto, it was produced by Grey and DeZuzio with additional production from Eminem. The song features vocals by American singer and frequent collaborator Skylar Grey.

The song debuted at number 100 on the UK Singles Chart and number 20 on the UK R&B Singles Chart. It was released as a single in Italy on December 25, 2020, through Universal.

== Personnel ==
- Marshall Mathers – main artist, vocals, additional producer, songwriter
- Holly Brook Hafermann – featured artist, vocals, producer, songwriter
- Jayson DeZuzio – producer, songwriter
- Luis Resto – keyboards, songwriter
- Elliott Taylor – songwriter
- Mike Strange – recording, mixing
- Tony Campana – recording

== Charts ==
Chart (2020)	Peak position
Canada Hot 100 (Billboard)	77
New Zealand Hot Singles (RMNZ)	7
UK Singles (OCC)	100
UK Hip Hop/R&B (OCC)	20
US Hot R&B/Hip-Hop Songs (Billboard)	38
