= Gnat (song) =

2020 song by Eminem

Song by Eminem

from the album Music to Be Murdered By: Side B
- Released: December 18, 2020
- Recorded: 2020
- Genre: Hip hop
- Length: 3:45
- Label: Shady; Aftermath; Interscope
- Songwriters: Marshall Mathers; David Doman; Anders Olofsson; Ezemdi Chikwendu; D. Levin; K. Mars
- Producer: D.A. Got That Dope

Music video
- "Gnat" on YouTube

"Gnat" is a song by American rapper Eminem from the deluxe edition of his eleventh studio album Music to Be Murdered By. It was released on December 18, 2020 along with the rest of Music to Be Murdered By: Side B (Deluxe Edition) and Cole Bennett-directed music video. It was written by Eminem and producer D.A. Got That Dope, alongside Anders Olofsson, Christopher S Torpey, Ezemdi Chikwendu, D. Levin, and K. Mars.

The song debuted at number 65 on the UK Singles Chart and number 11 on the UK R&B Singles Chart.

== Music video ==
The music video for "Gnat" marks the second collaboration between Eminem and Lyrical Lemonade, as Cole Bennett previously directed music video for "Godzilla".

In the music video, Eminem fights off a swarm of oversized bats in a yellow hazmat suit and other personal protective equipment gear, wipes down every surface with Lysol, gets paranoid about catching the COVID-19 to earn his freedom from quarantine, gets shot in the chest by a cuckolded husband after he dissed his wife, and bites the head off a bat. In some parts of the music video, Eminem is seen wearing a red tuxedo, a homage to the music video of "My Name Is". Additionally, he also wears a similar outfit from the "Space Bound" music video.

== Machine Gun Kelly line ==
In the chorus of the song, the lines "They come at me with machine guns, it's like trying to fight off a gnat" sparked an online debate about whether the "machine gun" mention was intended as a subliminal shot towards American rapper Machine Gun Kelly, who tweeted: "I'm under your skin" with an upside down smiley face emoji.

== Personnel ==
- Marshall Mathers – main artist, vocals, songwriter
- David Doman – producer, songwriter
- Luis Resto – keyboards
- Mike Strange – recording, mixing
- Tony Campana – recording

== Charts ==
Chart performance for "Gnat"
Chart (2020–2021)	Peak position
Canada Hot 100 (Billboard)	34
El Salvador Anglo (Monitor Latino)	16
Global 200 (Billboard)	69
Greece International Digital Singles (IFPI)	80
Ireland (IRMA)	65
New Zealand Hot Singles (RMNZ)	6
UK Singles (OCC)	65
UK Hip Hop/R&B (OCC)	11
US Billboard Hot 100	60
US Hot R&B/Hip-Hop Songs (Billboard)	13

== Certifications ==
Certifications for "Gnat"
Region	Certification	Certified units/sales
Australia (ARIA)	Gold	35,000^{‡}
^{‡} Sales+streaming figures based on certification alone.
