= Unaccommodating =

2020 song by American rapper Eminem

Song by Eminem featuring Young M.A

from the album Music to Be Murdered By
- Released: January 17, 2020
- Studio: Effigy Studios (Detroit, MI)
- Genre: Hip hop; trap
- Length: 3:36
- Label: Shady
- Songwriters: Marshall Mathers; Katorah Marrero; Timothy Suby; Luis Resto
- Producers: Tim Suby; Eminem (add.)

"Unaccommodating" is a song by American rapper Eminem, released from his eleventh studio album, Music to Be Murdered By, in 2020. It is the second track on the album, and features American rapper Young M.A performing the first verse. Recording sessions took place at Effigy Studios in Detroit with Mike Strange. Production was handled by Tim Suby with additional production by Eminem. The song is also Eminem's fastest using the method of the fastest peak burst, at 13.04 syllables per second.

Despite never being released as a single, the song charted worldwide.

== Controversy ==
The lyrics of "Unaccommodating", in which Eminem referenced the 2017 Manchester Arena bombing, drew significant criticism, with many critics finding the lyrics objectionable. The mayor of Greater Manchester Andy Burnham denounced the song's lyrics, describing them as "unnecessarily hurtful and deeply disrespectful". The lyrics also drew widespread criticism from victims' relatives and others involved in the attack.

Roisin O'Connor of The Independent criticized Eminem and said that he "belittles the trauma of a then 26-year-old Ariana Grande for kicks on 'Unaccommodating' by comparing himself to the Manchester Arena bomber."

== Personnel ==
- Marshall Mathers – main artist, vocals, songwriter, additional producer
- Katorah Marrero – featured artist, vocals, songwriter
- Timothy Suby – songwriter, producer
- Luis Resto – songwriter, additional keyboards
- Mike Strange – recording, mixing
- Joe Strange – additional engineering
- Tony Campana – additional engineering

== Charts ==
| Chart (2020) | Peak position |
|---|---|
| Australia (ARIA) | 34 |
| Canada Hot 100 (Billboard) | 25 |
| France (SNEP) | 105 |
| Greece International Digital Singles (IFPI) | 32 |
| Italy (FIMI) | 70 |
| New Zealand (Recorded Music NZ) | 37 |
| Sweden (Sverigetopplistan) | 71 |
| US Billboard Hot 100 | 36 |
| US Hot R&B/Hip-Hop Songs (Billboard) | 20 |

== Certifications ==
Certifications for "Unaccommodating"
| Region | Certification | Certified units/sales |
|---|---|---|
| Australia (ARIA) | Gold | 35,000^{‡} |
| United States (RIAA) | Gold | 500,000^{‡} |
^{‡} Sales+streaming figures based on certification alone.
