= Higher (Eminem song) =

2020 song by Eminem

Song by Eminem

from the album Music to Be Murdered By – Side B
- Released: December 18, 2020
- Recorded: 2020
- Genre: Hip hop; rap rock
- Length: 3:42
- Label: Shady; Aftermath; Interscope
- Songwriters: Marshall Mathers; Luis Resto; Sly Jordan; Mike Strange; Andre Brissett
- Producer: Eminem

Music video
- "Higher" on YouTube

"Higher" is a song by American rapper Eminem, released as the ninth track from the deluxe edition of his eleventh studio album Music to Be Murdered By, by Interscope, Aftermath, and Shady Records. It was produced by Eminem himself and was written by Eminem, Luis Resto, Mike Strange, Andre Brissett, and Sly "Pyper" Jordan, the latter of which provides additional vocals.

== Music video ==
The music video for "Higher" was released on January 23, 2021. It premiered during the pre-game show for UFC 257, which featured a rematch between Dustin Poirier and Conor McGregor. The video features clips from the UFC championship and contains a skit featuring a cameo from Dana White. The video pays homage to LL Cool J and his 1991 music video for "Mama Said Knock You Out".

== Reception ==
The song was well received by critics, who praised its motivational and inspirational themes. It has been called an "anthem for the sports world" and a "spiritual successor to [Eminem's] 2002 track ''Till I Collapse'".

== Personnel ==
- Marshall Mathers – main artist, vocals, songwriter, producer
- Luis Resto – songwriter, keyboards
- Sly "Pyper" Jordan – writer, additional vocals
- Mike Strange – writer, recorder, mixer
- Andre Brissett – writer
- Tony Campana – recorder
