= Music to Be Murdered By =

2020 studio album by Eminem

- Standard edition artwork

Studio album by Eminem
- Released: January 17, 2020
- Recorded: 2019
- Studios: Record One (Los Angeles); Effigy (Detroit); Heaven (Detroit); The ICU (Brentwood, California)
- Genres: Hip-hop; trap
- Length: 64:23
- Labels: Shady; Goliath; Aftermath; Interscope
- Producers: Eminem; Dr. Dre; Alchemist; Andre "Briss" Brissett; D. A. Doman; Dawaun Parker; Dem Jointz; Erik "Blu2th" Griggs; Lance Nicholas; Fred; Luis Resto; Mark Batson; Mr. Porter; Ricky Racks; Royce da 5'9"; Skylar Grey; Tim Suby; Trevor Lawrence Jr.

Eminem chronology
Kamikaze (2018)	Music to Be Murdered By (2020)	Curtain Call 2 (2022)

Alternative cover
- Side B deluxe edition artwork

Singles from Music to Be Murdered By
- 1. "Darkness" Released: January 17, 2020; 2. "Godzilla" Released: January 31, 2020

Music to Be Murdered By (Also referred to as MTBMB) is the eleventh studio album by the American rapper Eminem. It was released on January 17, 2020, through Shady Records, Goliath Artists, Aftermath Entertainment, and Interscope Records. Just like his previous studio album, Kamikaze (2018), it is executive produced by Eminem and Dr. Dre and was released with no prior announcement. The album was produced by many producers, with Dr. Dre returning to produce songs for Eminem for the first time since 2010's Recovery. Guest appearances include Skylar Grey, Young M.A, Royce da 5'9", White Gold, Ed Sheeran, the late Juice Wrld, Black Thought, Q-Tip, Denaun, Anderson .Paak, Don Toliver, Kxng Crooked, and Joell Ortiz.

The title, cover art, and concept of Music to Be Murdered By are inspired by Alfred Hitchcock and Jeff Alexander's 1958 spoken word album Alfred Hitchcock Presents Music to Be Murdered By. The album was supported by two singles: "Darkness" and "Godzilla". Alongside the album's surprise release, Eminem also released the music video for "Darkness", which revolves around the 2017 Las Vegas shooting from the point of view of the perpetrator Stephen Paddock alternating with Eminem's own.

Music to Be Murdered By debuted at number one on the Billboard 200, selling 279,000 album-equivalent units in its first week. Subsequently, Eminem became the first artist to have ten consecutive number-one albums in the US and one of six artists to have released at least ten US number-one albums. The album reached number one in 16 countries. The album was met with favorable reviews from music critics; some highlighted its production, while others criticized Eminem's performances.

== Recording and production ==
In 2019, A&R representative Mike "Heron" Herard of Shady Records pursued production contributions for a new album by Eminem. Eventually, a group of producers had been enlisted for the project, including Eminem's longtime creative partners Royce da 5'9" and Dr. Dre, as well as the latter's colleagues – Dawaun Parker, Lawrence Jr., Dem Jointz, Mista Choc, DJ Silk, and Erik Griggs – and young, burgeoning producers – D.A. Doman (producer of Tyga's "Taste") and Ricky Racks (producer of Future's "Crushed Up").

According to a January 2020 Rolling Stone feature on the album's making, "Lawrence Jr. has been working sporadically with Dr. Dre since the rapper-producer left Death Row Records in the Nineties; starting in the summer, the drummer went into the studio with the rest of Dr. Dre's team to create a suite of tracks that ended up on the back half of Music to Be Murdered By." Lawrence Jr. told the magazine, "Dem Jointz is a producer, Eric Griggs plays keys, bass, and guitar, Dawaun Parker is a keyboard player and producer, myself, I'm a drummer. We know Dre's instincts, and he's the coach, the orchestrator."

Other collaborators for the album included Black Thought, Q-Tip, Juice Wrld, Ed Sheeran, Young M.A, Skylar Grey, Don Toliver, Anderson .Paak, Kxng Crooked and Joell Ortiz. On the track "Godzilla", Eminem recorded a third verse that broke the record for the fastest verse on a charted track, rapping 10.65 syllables per second. Eminem surpassed his own records held by his featured verse on Nicki Minaj's 2018 song "Majesty", where he rapped 10.3 syllables per second, and his 2013 single "Rap God", where he rapped 9.6 syllables per second.

== Release and promotion ==
The album was released on January 17, 2020, by Shady Records, Aftermath Entertainment and Interscope Records. It was released as a surprise with no prior announcement, similarly to his previous and tenth studio album Kamikaze (2018). Alongside the album's release, Eminem also released a music video for "Darkness", directed by James Larese. The video, which revolves around the 2017 Las Vegas shooting from the point of view of the perpetrator Stephen Paddock alternating with Eminem's own, garnered appraisal but controversy too. On January 31, 2020, "Godzilla" was released as a single, with a music video directed by Cole Bennett later being released on March 6.

=== Title and artwork ===
Alfred Hitchcock Presents Music to Be Murdered By, which inspired this album's title and alternate cover

The album's title and alternative cover art are taken from the 1958 album Alfred Hitchcock Presents Music to Be Murdered By, which interspersed audio of the director Alfred Hitchcock's wry, dark humor into easy listening instrumentals arranged by Jeff Alexander. Eminem tweeted an image of the 1958 album cover featuring Hitchcock holding an axe and a gun to his head and stated that his album's alternative cover was "inspired by the master, Uncle Alfred!" Audio of Hitchcock's voice from the 1958 album is sampled in the interludes "Alfred" and "Alfred (Outro)" and the beginning of the track "Little Engine". Both the 1958 and 2020 albums end with Hitchcock stating, "If you haven't been murdered, I can only say better luck next time. If you have been, goodnight, wherever you are." Mark Beech of Forbes magazine connected the alternate cover to this album's concept of murder and violence.

The album has three covers; the digital cover features Eminem posing with a shovel, wearing a suit and a fedora. The album's alternate cover features Eminem pointing a gun and holding an axe to his head. The physical CD cover features Eminem, hatless, posing with his hands behind his back. In the packaging, Eminem dedicates the album to rapper Juice Wrld, who died from an accidental drug overdose on December 8, 2019, and Eminem's former bodyguard CeeAaqil Allah Barnes who also died. Juice Wrld's feature on "Godzilla" marked his first posthumous release.

=== Reissue ===
On December 18, 2020, a deluxe edition of the album, titled Music to Be Murdered By – Side B, was released. Similar to Eminem's previous two albums, it was released without any prior announcement. It contains a bonus disc with sixteen new tracks, with guest appearances by Skylar Grey, DJ Premier, Ty Dolla $ign, Dr. Dre, Sly Pyper, MAJ, and White Gold. The album's release was accompanied by a music video for "Gnat", directed by Cole Bennett. The music video for "Higher" premiered on January 23, 2021. Lyric videos for "Alfred's Theme" and "Tone Deaf" were also released; in the latter song, Eminem pays tribute to the late Chicago rapper King Von. In May 2021, a remix of "Killer", featuring Jack Harlow and Cordae, was released.

== Critical reception ==
=== Disc one ===
Professional ratings
Aggregate scores
Source	Rating
AnyDecentMusic?	5.8/10
Metacritic	64/100
Review scores
Source	Rating
AllMusic	3/5 stars
And It Don't Stop	A−
Clash	7/10
The Daily Telegraph	5/5 stars
Entertainment Weekly	B
The Guardian	3/5 stars
The Independent	2/5 stars
NME	3/5 stars
Pitchfork	5.5/10
Rolling Stone	3/5 stars

Music to Be Murdered By was met with mixed to positive reviews. According to the review aggregator Metacritic, Music to Be Murdered By received "generally favorable reviews" based on a weighted average score of 64 out of 100 from 17 critic scores. The aggregator AnyDecentMusic? assessed the critical consensus with an average score of 5.8 out of 10.

Reviewing for The Daily Telegraph, Neil McCormick said Music to Be Murdered By "offers over an hour of the world's greatest rapper blasting away on all cylinders", hailing it as "the first great album of 2020, so lethally brilliant [that] it should be a crime". Scott Glaysher of HipHopDX was also positive, and compared the album to Eminem's previous bodies of work, stating in his review that "Music To Be Murdered By is far from the star-studded, commercially sustainable album Recovery was, but that isn't necessarily a bad thing. On this album, despite its handful of flaws, Em shows strong signs of adapting to the times through modern musical choices and smarter songwriting." Consequence of Sound's Dan Weiss was generally positive, and, about the album's themes, he said that "If he's figuring out from scratch how to be a compelling artist again, Eminem's improved the caliber of his beats and guests, taking stands against the right day-to-day injustices, toning down the tasteless (with the exception of the already-infamous Ariana line, of course), and rapping with the manic precision of someone who just snorted a whole sandcastle of cocaine and Vyvanse. If only a single minute of it was as hilarious or bracing as Chris D'Elia's impression of him." Similarly, Fred Thomas of AllMusic opined, "Music to Be Murdered By sees Eminem pulling himself out of Kamikaze's wreckage somewhat, though he still falls victim to moments of willful dumbness and a tedious self-obsession that's become par for the course. On the album's best tracks, there are still hints of the fire that made Eminem a rap legend."

Entertainment Weekly's Christopher R. Weingarten was more critical, stating that, "As a whole, Music to Be Murdered By is as hit-and-miss as anything Eminem has released this side of the millennium. But remove the skits, the relationship songs, the family songs, the morose gun control song, and the quirky Ed Sheeran club goof and you still have 36 solid minutes of the daffy, one-of-a-kind rap genius that keeps captivating true-school heads and longtime fans. Or, if you'd like, keep it all and you still have the most solid work he's done in a few years." NME's Jordan Basset was ambivalent towards the album's lyrical themes and stated, "He splits the difference on Music To Be Murdered By, indulging his immature ego (griping at bad reviews, stirring controversy for the sake of it) even as he offers salient social criticism and admits his missteps. He's ready to pass on hard-earned wisdom before running his mouth like he hasn't learned his own lessons. And he offers casual fans a hook or two before embarking on another lyrical work-out." Paul A. Thompson of Pitchfork said that the album "is not, strictly speaking, a good record—Eminem hasn't made one of those in a decade—but his latest boasts enough technical command and generates just enough arresting ideas to hold your attention."

Retrospectively, in a 2024 ranking of Eminem's 12 studio albums, Damien Scott of Billboard magazine placed Music to Be Murdered By seventh, noting the broad list of guest rappers and producers while criticizing the length, writing: "The theme only loosely ties the album together, but it doesn't really matter: Em is rapping his ass off all throughout the set, while creating spaces for new rappers to do their thing without it feeling as if they're being subsumed into ShadyLand. And, like the best Em albums, there's a variety of song types to appease all corners of his fanbase."

==== Controversy ====
The song "Darkness", about the 2017 Las Vegas shooting and told from the point of view of the shooter Stephen Paddock alternating with Eminem's own, has garnered particular attention and critical acclaim.

The lyrics of "Unaccommodating", in which Eminem referenced the 2017 Manchester Arena bombing, drew significant criticism, with many critics finding the lyrics objectionable. The Mayor of Greater Manchester Andy Burnham denounced the song's lyrics, describing them as "unnecessarily hurtful and deeply disrespectful." The lyrics also drew widespread criticism from victims' relatives and others involved in the attack.

Roisin O'Connor of The Independent gave the album a negative review, and criticized the album by saying, "Eminem belittles the trauma of a then 26-year-old Ariana Grande for kicks on 'Unaccommodating' by comparing himself to the Manchester Arena bomber. The sour taste of this track lingers well beyond the album's centrepiece, 'Darkness', which is intended as a searing critique of America's toxic gun culture. Instead, his use of gunfire and explosion samples feels grossly exploitative."

=== Disc two ===
Professional ratings
Aggregate scores
Source	Rating
AnyDecentMusic?	5.3/10
Metacritic	65/100
Review scores
Source	Rating
And It Don't Stop	B+
The Arts Desk	2/5 stars
Beats Per Minute	67/100
Exclaim!	7/10
The Forty-Five	3.5/5 stars
The Guardian	3/5 stars
HipHopDX	3.5/5
RapReviews	6.5/10
Rolling Stone	2.5/5 stars
The Telegraph	4/5 stars

According to the review aggregator Metacritic, Side B received "generally favorable reviews" based on a weighted average score of 65 out of 100 from 7 critic scores. Robert Christgau appraised the release as "more proof that Eminem loves rhyme as compulsively as MF DOOM". Rolling Stone wrote that on the reissue Eminem "covers everything from Covid-19 to Colin Kaepernick but the results feel superfluous rather than subversive". The Guardian argued that "The music is less interesting than on its predecessor", saying that the project is "one for the stans". Exclaim! stated that "Once he accepts the idea that no full-length will impact like The Eminem Show or The Marshall Mathers LP, maybe he'll be free of the need to touch all the bases and please all the faces."

== Commercial performance ==
In the United States, Music to Be Murdered By debuted at number one on the US Billboard 200 chart, earning 279,000 album-equivalent units (including 117,000 copies as traditional album sales) in its first week. This became Eminem's tenth US number-one album and made him one of only six artists to have released at least ten number-one albums. The album also accumulated a total of 217.6 million on-demand streams for the album's tracks. As of December 2020, Music to Be Murdered By had sold over 1,053,000 equivalent units, including 249,000 in pure sales.

Eventually, Music to Be Murdered By was the 9th best-selling album (in pure sales) of 2020 in the United States, with 287,000 copies.

The album debuted at number-one in other countries. It became Eminem's 11th number-one album in Canada, while debuting atop the Canadian Albums Chart with 33,000 album-equivalent units. The album remained at the top spot in Canada for four straight weeks, the longest for an Eminem album since Recovery. It also entered at number one on the UK Albums Chart with first week sales of 36,000 album equivalent units, making Eminem the first artist to release 10 consecutive number one albums in the UK. He also achieved a chart double with Godzilla debuting at number one on the UK Singles Chart.

The week the deluxe edition was released, the album saw a 1,125% boost in sale units from the previous week, moving 94,000 units. This brought the album back up to the 3rd spot on the Billboard 200 album chart in its 48th week, a 196 spot jump from the week previous, breaking a 50-year-old Billboard 200 record previously held by Bob Dylan with Self Portrait (1970) which made a 193 spot jump.

== Track listing ==
=== Music to Be Murdered By ===
Disc one
No.	Title	Writer(s)	Producer(s)	Length
1.	"Premonition (Intro)"	Marshall Mathers; Nikki Grier; Andre Young; Mark Batson; Dawaun Parker; Luis Resto; Jeff Alexander	Eminem; Dr. Dre; Batson; Parker^{[b]}; Resto^{[b]}	2:53
2.	"Unaccommodating" (featuring Young M.A)	Mathers; Katorah Marrero; Resto; Tim Suby	Eminem; Suby^{[b]}	3:36
3.	"You Gon' Learn" (featuring Royce da 5'9" and White Gold)	Mathers; Ryan Montgomery; Bobby Yewah; Resto; Carol Connors; David Shire	Royce da 5'9"; Eminem^{[a]}; Resto^{[b]}	3:54
4.	"Alfred (Interlude)"	Young; Parker; Andre Brissett; Alexander	Dr. Dre; Parker; Briss	0:30
5.	"Those Kinda Nights" (featuring Ed Sheeran)	Mathers; Ed Sheeran; Fred Gibson; Resto; David Doman; Adrienne Byrne	D.A Got That Dope; Eminem^{[a]}; Fred^{[b]}	2:57
6.	"In Too Deep"	Mathers; Suby; Oliver Chanin; Resto; Sylvester Jordan	Suby; Eminem^{[a]}	3:14
7.	"Godzilla" (featuring Juice Wrld)	Mathers; Jarad Higgins; Resto; Doman; Alejandro Villasana	D.A Got That Dope; Lance Nicholas; Eminem^{[b]}	3:30
8.	"Darkness"	Mathers; Montgomery; Resto; Paul Simon	Eminem; Royce da 5'9"; Resto^{[b]}	5:37
9.	"Leaving Heaven" (featuring Skylar Grey)	Mathers; Holly Hafermann; Elliott Taylor	Skylar Grey; Eminem^{[a]}	4:25
10.	"Yah Yah" (featuring Royce da 5'9", Black Thought, Q-Tip, and Denaun)	Mathers; Montgomery; Tariq Trotter; Denaun Porter; Trevor Smith; Rashad Smith; Galt MacDermot; James Brown; Charles Bobbit; Fred Wesley; William Hines; Andre Weston	Mr. Porter	4:46
11.	"Stepdad (Intro)"	Young	Dr. Dre	0:15
12.	"Stepdad"	Mathers; Daniel Maman; Resto; Luis Alberto Spinetta; Black Amaya; Carlos Cutaia	Eminem; The Alchemist; Resto^{[b]}	3:33
13.	"Marsh"	Mathers; Resto	Eminem; Resto^{[b]}	3:20
14.	"Never Love Again"	Mathers; Young; Resto; Dwayne Abernathy Jr.; Trevor Lawrence Jr.; Parker	Eminem^{[b]}; Dr. Dre; Dem Jointz; Trevor Lawrence Jr.; Parker	2:57
15.	"Little Engine"	Mathers; Young; Erik Griggs; Lawrence; Parker; Alexander	Dr. Dre; Erik "Blu2th" Griggs; Lawrence; Parker	2:57
16.	"Lock It Up" (featuring Anderson .Paak)	Mathers; Brandon Anderson; Young; Parker; Griggs; Lawrence; Abernathy	Dr. Dre; Parker; Griggs; Lawrence; Dem Jointz	2:50
17.	"Farewell"	Mathers; Resto; Ricky Harrell Jr.; Dave Kelly; Craig Marsh	Ricky Racks; Eminem^{[b]}	4:07
18.	"No Regrets" (featuring Don Toliver)	Mathers; Caleb Toliver; Doman; Daniel Kostov; Justin Thomas; Anders Olofsson	D.A Got That Dope; Eminem^{[b]}	3:20
19.	"I Will" (featuring Kxng Crooked, Royce da 5'9", and Joell Ortiz)	Mathers; Dominick Wickliffe; Montgomery; Joell Ortiz; Resto	Eminem; Resto^{[b]}	5:03
20.	"Alfred (Outro)"	Young; Parker; Brissett; Alexander	Dr. Dre; Parker; Briss	0:39
Total length:				64:23

=== Music to Be Murdered By – Side B ===
Disc two
No.	Title	Writer(s)	Producer(s)	Length
1.	"Alfred" (Intro)	Mathers; Resto; Alexander	Eminem	0:17
2.	"Black Magic" (with Skylar Grey)	Mathers; Hafermann; Taylor; Resto; Jayson DeZuzio	Skylar Grey; Jayson DeZuzio; Eminem^{[b]}	2:54
3.	"Alfred's Theme"	Mathers; Resto; Charles-Francis Gounod	Eminem	5:39
4.	"Tone Deaf"	Mathers; Resto	Eminem; Resto^{[b]}	4:50
5.	"Book of Rhymes" (featuring DJ Premier)	Mathers; Christopher Martin; Ray Fraser; Resto; Ronald Spence Jr.; Marrero; Matthew Jacobson; Nayvadius Wilburn; Jacob Canady; Nasir Jones; Peter Phillips	Eminem; IllaDaProducer; Resto^{[b]}	4:49
6.	"Favorite Bitch" (featuring Ty Dolla $ign)	Mathers; Tyrone Griffin, Jr.; Sly Jordan; Resto; Byron Perry; MJ Nichols	Blacknailz; MJ Nichols; Eminem^{[a]}	3:56
7.	"Guns Blazing" (featuring Dr. Dre and Sly Pyper)	Mathers; Young; Jordan; Resto; Jeremy Zumo Kollie; Jason Pounds; V. Smith	J.LBS; Eminem^{[a]}	3:16
8.	"Gnat"	Mathers; Doman; Anders Olofsson; Ezemdi Chikwendu; D. Levin; K. Mars	D.A. Got That Dope	3:44
9.	"Higher"	Mathers; Resto; Jordan; Mike Strange; Brissett	Eminem	3:42
10.	"These Demons" (featuring MAJ)	Mathers; James Hudson Jr.; Yewah; Doman; William Coleman; Shiv Barot; Pat Rosario; Levin; M. Benzinger	Eminem; D.A. Got That Dope; Mike Zombie; The Loud Pack	3:27
11.	"Key" (Skit)	Mathers; Resto	Eminem	0:57
12.	"She Loves Me"	Mathers; Jordan; Young; Bernard Edwards Jr.; Griggs; Lawrence	Dr. Dre; Focus...; Blu2th; Lawrence; Eminem^{[b]}	3:24
13.	"Killer"	Mathers; Doman; Chikwendu	D.A. Got That Dope; Lance Nicholas	3:15
14.	"Zeus" (featuring White Gold)	Mathers; Yewah; Tyler Williams; Luca Mauti	T-Minus; Eminem^{[b]}; Luca Mauti^{[b]}	3:50
15.	"Thus Far" (Interlude)	Mathers; Resto; Alexander	Eminem	0:16
16.	"Discombobulated"	Mathers; Young; Larry Griffin Jr.; Batson; Parker; Nichols; Lawrence; Frano Huett	Dr. Dre; S1; Batson; Parker; Lance Nicholas; Lonestarrmuzik; Lawrence; franO^{[a]}	4:12
Total length:				52:28

Notes

- ^{^[a]} signifies a co-producer
- ^{^[b]} signifies an additional producer

Sample credits

- "Premonition (Intro)" and "Alfred (Interlude)" contain samples of "Music to Be Murdered By", written by Jeff Alexander, as performed by Alfred Hitchcock.
- "Alfred (Outro)" contains a sample of "The Hour of Parting", written by Jeff Alexander, as performed by Alfred Hitchcock.
- "Little Engine" contains a sample of "Do Not Stand a Ghost of a Chance with You", written by Jeff Alexander, as performed by Alfred Hitchcock.
- "Stepdad" contains a sample of "Amame Peteribí", written by Luis Alberto Spinetta, Juan Carlos Amaya and Carlos Cutaia, as performed by Pescado Rabioso.
- "Farewell" contains a sample of "No Games", written by Craig Marsh and Dave Kelly, as performed by Serani.
- "Yah Yah" samples vocals from "Woo Hah!! Got You All in Check", written and performed by Busta Rhymes.

== Personnel ==
- Eminem – vocals, producer (tracks 1, 2, 8, 12, 13, 19), co-producer (tracks 3, 5, 6, 9), additional production (tracks 2, 7, 14.1, 17, 18), executive producer

=== Disc one ===
Musicians

- Black Thought – featured artist (track 10)
- Adrienne "Aeb" Byrne – additional programming (track 5)
- Kxng Crooked – featured artist (track 19)
- Dem Jointz – additional drums (track 15)
- Focus… – additional drums and keyboards (track 16)
- FredWreck – additional drum programming (track 14.1), additional keyboards (track 14.2)
- Nikki Grier – additional vocals (track 1.1)
- Erik "Blu2th" Griggs – bass (track 14.1), additional drums (track 14.2)
- Skylar Grey – featured artist (track 9)
- Juice Wrld – featured artist (track 7)
- Daniel Kostov – additional programming (track 18)
- Anders Olofsson – additional programming (track 18)
- Joell Ortiz – featured artist (track 19)
- Anderson .Paak – featured artist (track 16)
- Dawaun Parker – additional drums (track 14.2)
- Denaun Porter – featured artist (track 10)
- Sly Pyper – background vocals (track 6)
- Q-Tip – featured artist (track 10)
- Luis Resto – additional keyboards (tracks 2–10, 12, 13, 14.1, 17–19)
- Royce da 5'9" – featured artist (tracks 3, 10, 19)
- Ed Sheeran – featured artist (track 5)
- Justin Thomas – additional programming (track 18)
- Don Toliver – featured artist (track 18)
- White Gold – featured artist (track 3)
- Alejandro Villasana – additional programming (track 7)
- Young M.A – featured artist (track 2)

Technical personnel

- The Alchemist – producer (track 12)
- Mark Batson – producer (track 1.1)
- Andre "Briss" Brissett – producer (tracks 4, 20)
- Tony Campana – assistant engineer (tracks 1.2, 2–10, 12–20)
- D.A. Doman – producer (tracks 5, 7, 18)
- Dem Jointz – producer (tracks 14, 16)
- Dr. Dre – producer (tracks 1.1, 4, 11, 14–16, 20), mixing (tracks 1.1, 11, 14–16), executive producer
- IV Duncan – engineer (tracks 3, 10)
- Fred – additional production (track 5)
- Brian "Big Bass" Gardner – mastering
- Quentin "Q" Gilkey – engineer (tracks 4, 11, 14–16, 20)
- Skylar Grey – producer (track 9)
- Erik "Blu2th" Griggs – producer (tracks 15, 16)
- Mauricio "Veto" Iragorri – engineer (track 1.1)
- Brian "B-Jones" Jones – engineer (tracks 3, 8, 10)
- Trevor Lawrence Jr. – producer (tracks 14–16)
- Victor Levants – engineer (track 7), assistant engineer (tracks 4, 6, 14–16, 20)
- Juan "Saucy" Peña – recording engineer (10)
- Dawaun Parker – producer (track 4, 14.1, 15, 16, 20), additional production (track 1.1)
- Denaun Porter – producer (track 10)
- Ricky Racks – producer (track 17)
- Luis Resto – additional production (tracks 1.2, 3, 8, 12, 13, 19)
- Robert Reyes – assistant engineer (track 1.1)
- Royce da 5'9" – producer (tracks 3, 8)
- Joe Strange – assistant engineer (tracks 1.2, 2–10, 12–20)
- Mike Strange – engineer (tracks 1.2, 2–10, 12–20), mixing (tracks 1.2, 2, 3, 5–10, 12, 13, 17–19)
- Tim Suby – producer (tracks 2, 6)
- Julio Ulloa – assistant engineer (track 7)

=== Disc two ===
Musicians

- Luis Resto – keyboards (1–3, 5–10, 12–15)
- Ken Lewis – orchestra leader (3)
- Dominic Rivinius – percussion (3)
- Sly Pyper – additional vocals (6, 9, 12)
- Mike Strange – additional keyboards (9)
- Jerry "Jay Flat" Williams – saxophone (12)
- Zekkereya El-Megharbel – trombone (12)
- Chris Lowery – trumpet (12)

Technical

- Mike Strange – mixer (1–10, 12–16), recording engineer (all tracks)
- Tony Campana – recording engineer (1–11, 14–16)
- Brett Kolatalo – recording engineer (3)
- Joe Strange – recording engineer (5, 13)
- Lola A. Romero – recording engineer (7)
- Fredwreck – recording engineer (7)
- Victor Luevanos – recording engineer (12, 16)
- Quentin "Q" Gilkey – recording engineer (12, 16)
- Maurecio "Veto" Iragorri – recording engineer (16)
- Jeremy Zumo Kollie – assistant recording engineer (7)
- Robert Reyes – assistant recording engineer (16)

== Charts ==
=== Weekly charts ===
Weekly chart performance for Music to Be Murdered By
Chart (2020)	Peak position
Australian Albums (ARIA)	1
Austrian Albums (Ö3 Austria)	1
Belgian Albums (Ultratop Flanders)	1
Belgian Albums (Ultratop Wallonia)	5
Canadian Albums (Billboard)	1
Czech Albums (ČNS IFPI)	1
Danish Albums (Hitlisten)	1
Dutch Albums (Album Top 100)	1
Estonian Albums (Eesti Tipp-40)	1
Finnish Albums (Suomen virallinen lista)	1
French Albums (SNEP)	4
German Albums (Offizielle Top 100)	2
Greek Albums (IFPI)	1
Hungarian Albums (MAHASZ)	15
Irish Albums (Official Charts)	1
Italian Albums (FIMI)	4
Japanese Albums (Oricon)	38
Japan Hot Albums (Billboard Japan)	42
Lithuanian Albums (AGATA)	1
New Zealand Albums (RMNZ)	1
Norwegian Albums (VG-lista)	1
Polish Albums (ZPAV)	5
Portuguese Albums (AFP)	2
Scottish Albums (Official Charts)	2
Slovak Albums (ČNS IFPI)	2
South Korean Albums (Gaon)	52
Spanish Albums (Promusicae)	14
Swedish Albums (Sverigetopplistan)	2
Swiss Albums (Schweizer Hitparade)	1
UK Albums (Official Charts)	1
UK R&B Albums (Official Charts)	1
US Billboard 200	1
US Top R&B/Hip-Hop Albums (Billboard)	1

=== Year-end charts ===
2020 year-end chart performance for Music to Be Murdered By
Chart (2020)	Position
Australian Albums (ARIA)	10
Australian Hip Hop/R&B Albums (ARIA)	2
Austrian Albums (Ö3 Austria)	32
Belgian Albums (Ultratop Flanders)	28
Belgian Albums (Ultratop Wallonia)	117
Canadian Albums (Billboard)	7
Danish Albums (Hitlisten)	19
Dutch Albums (Album Top 100)	20
French Albums (SNEP)	114
German Albums (Offizielle Top 100)	69
Icelandic Albums (Tónlistinn)	47
Irish Albums (IRMA)	23
Italian Albums (FIMI)	67
New Zealand Albums (RMNZ)	21
Norwegian Albums (VG-lista)	15
Swedish Albums (Sverigetopplistan)	32
Swiss Albums (Schweizer Hitparade)	12
UK Albums (OCC)	11
US Billboard 200	21
US Top R&B/Hip-Hop Albums (Billboard)	14

2021 year-end chart performance for Music to Be Murdered By
Chart (2021)	Position
Australian Albums (ARIA)	77
Australian Hip Hop/R&B Albums (ARIA)	20
Belgian Albums (Ultratop Flanders)	98
Canadian Albums (Billboard)	16
Swiss Albums (Schweizer Hitparade)	81
US Billboard 200	46

2022 year-end chart performance for Music to Be Murdered By
Chart (2022)	Position
US Billboard 200	191

== Certifications and sales ==
Certifications and sales for Music to Be Murdered By
Region	Certification	Certified units/sales
Australia (ARIA)	Gold	35,000^{‡}
Austria (IFPI Austria)	Platinum	15,000^{‡}
Canada (Music Canada)	Platinum	80,000^{‡}
China	—	465,118
Denmark (IFPI Danmark)	Platinum	20,000^{‡}
France (SNEP)	Gold	50,000^{‡}
Germany (BVMI)	Gold	100,000^{‡}
Italy (FIMI)	Platinum	50,000^{‡}
New Zealand (RMNZ)	2× Platinum	30,000^{‡}
Poland (ZPAV)	Platinum	20,000^{‡}
United Kingdom (BPI)	Platinum	300,000^{‡}
United States (RIAA)	Platinum	1,000,000^{‡}
^{‡} Sales+streaming figures based on certification alone.

== See also ==
- Murder ballad
