= The Adventures of Moon Man & Slim Shady =

2020 single by Kid Cudi and Eminem

Single by Kid Cudi and Eminem
- Released: July 10, 2020
- Recorded: 2020
- Genre: Hip-hop
- Length: 4:24
- Label: Wicked Awesome; Republic
- Songwriters: Scott Mescudi; Marshall Mathers; Julian Gramma; Chason Samuel; Oladipo Omishore; Luis Resto
- Producers: Dot da Genius; J Gramm; Eminem (co.)

Kid Cudi singles chronology
| "The Scotts" (2020) | "The Adventures of Moon Man & Slim Shady" (2020) | "Transparent Soul" (2021) |

Eminem singles chronology
| "Godzilla" (2020) | "The Adventures of Moon Man & Slim Shady" (2020) | "Last One Standing" (2021) |

Lyric video
- The Adventures of Moon Man & Slim Shady

"The Adventures of Moon Man & Slim Shady" is a song by American rappers Kid Cudi and Eminem. It was released as a stand-alone single on July 10, 2020. The song was produced by frequent Kid Cudi collaborator Dot da Genius, along with J Gramm and co-production by Eminem. The song's title refers to Cudi's moniker the "Moon Man" and Eminem's alter-ego Slim Shady.

== Background ==
On May 7, 2020, Kid Cudi tweeted "rap god. Help!", sparking speculation about what it might mean Rapper Lil Wayne had Eminem on his Apple Music show "Young Money Radio" on May 8 and informed Eminem about Cudi's tweet, of which Eminem said he had been unaware. Then, on July 3, Kid Cudi tweeted again, this time writing "7/10/2020", which some publications speculated might be referring to new music. The song was announced on July 8, when Kid Cudi posted a video of his daughter teasing the song. Eminem confirmed his involvement the following day and Kid Cudi released the cover art.

Kid Cudi reacted to Eminem's verse, saying "Yo bro, you fucking destroyed this shit". NME then ran an article, in which they quote Cudi as implying that he was unhappy with Eminem's verse. Cudi later responded to the publication, saying he never meant anything negative: "Never said this and im not sure how yall came up w [sic] it. I was clearly excited about my feature. Never once said I was unhappy about it nor did my energy suggest that. So to NME, get ur shit together and stop spreading LIES".

== Composition and lyrics ==
"The Adventures of Moon Man & Slim Shady" is backed by ambient synth sounds, a hip-hop drum beat, a low bass line and orchestral-style strings.

Vulture's Chris Murphy said "Although the title suggests equal billing between the two rappers, technically it's a Kid Cudi song featuring Eminem, and it sounds like it. Cudi takes the first half of the song, before Eminem takes the back half. In Kid Cudi's verse, he raps about his jaunts and his "stint in rehab". In Eminem's verse, he references the COVID-19 pandemic, the murders of George Floyd and Ahmaud Arbery, while criticizing anti-maskers, police brutality, and Drew Brees. Eminem also raps about his sobriety, name-dropping known cannabis-smokers Lil Wayne and Snoop Dogg. At the end of the track, Kid Cudi delivers a line in reference to a future continuation of the Man On the Moon series to complete the album trilogy, which he has previously announced over the years. The referenced album, Man on the Moon III: The Chosen, was released by Cudi on December 11, 2020.

== Critical reception ==
Consequence of Sound's Matt Melis named it the song of the week, calling it an "adventure that feels too hot to have been given much time to cool off". Melis commended the artists for bringing their individual talents to the song, noting Cudi's established "authenticity" and producer Dot da Genius' production that "allows Cudi to pause in reflection but never come to a full stop, creating a momentum where principle and purpose feel more important than perfection". Billboard's Mitchell Peters called the track "fiery". Josh Stewart of Dancing Astronaut praised the song, stating it "does what many collaborations or features cannot, pulling off a true artistic amalgamation of the two styles while concocting something fresh along the way". Robin Murray of Clash magazine said the "rap heavyweights" deliver "a huge piece of stadium level hip-hop". Conversely, Jonathan Robles of Variance called the song "somewhat of a dud", although stating that Eminem "naturally" grabs the spotlight over multiple lines.

== Music video ==
An animated lyric video was released along with the song, in which Kid Cudi and Eminem appear as crime-fighting comic superheroes, Moon Man and Slim Shady.

== Charts ==
| Chart (2020) | Peak position |
|---|---|
| Australia (ARIA) | 90 |
| Canada Hot 100 (Billboard) | 20 |
| Ireland (IRMA) | 30 |
| New Zealand Hot Singles (RMNZ) | 5 |
| Scottish Singles Sales (Official Charts) | 15 |
| UK Singles (Official Charts) | 44 |
| US Billboard Hot 100 | 22 |
| US Hot R&B/Hip-Hop Songs (Billboard) | 15 |
| US Rolling Stone Top 100 | 19 |
