= Hell Breaks Loose =

Promotional single by Eminem featuring Dr. Dre

from the album Relapse: Refill
- Released: December 15, 2009 (digital)
- Genre: Hip hop
- Length: 4:04
- Label: Shady; Aftermath; Interscope
- Songwriters: Marshall Mathers; Andre Young; Mark Batson; Dawaun Parker; Mike Elizondo
- Producers: Dr. Dre; Mark Batson

Eminem chronology
"Forever" (2009)	"Hell Breaks Loose" (2009)	"Elevator" (2009)

Dr. Dre singles chronology
"Old Time's Sake" (2009)	"Hell Breaks Loose" (2009)	"Kush" (2010)

"Hell Breaks Loose" is a hip-hop song by American rapper Eminem, featured on his 2009 album Relapse: Refill the re-release of Relapse. "Hell Breaks Loose" was a promotional single released on December 15, releasing the same day as "Elevator". The song features Dr. Dre, who also produced the song with Mark Batson. On the week ending January 2, 2010, "Hell Breaks Loose" debuted at #29 on the Billboard Hot 100, as the week's Hot Shot Debut.

== Track listing ==
No.	Title	Writer(s)	Producer(s)	Length
1.	"Hell Breaks Loose" (feat. Dr. Dre) (explicit album version)	Marshall Mathers; Andre Young; Mark Batson; Dawaun Parker; Trevor Lawrence, Jr.	Dr. Dre; Mark Batson	4:04

== Charts ==
Chart (2010)	Peak position
Brazil (ABPD)	89
Canada (Canadian Hot 100)	21
US Billboard Hot 100	29
