= No Apologies (Eminem song) =

2006 song by Eminem

Song by Eminem

from the album Eminem Presents: The Re-Up
- Released: December 5, 2006
- Studio: 54 Sound Studios (Detroit, Michigan)
- Genre: Hip-hop
- Length: 4:18
- Label: Shady; Aftermath; Interscope
- Songwriters: Marshall Mathers; Luis Resto
- Producers: Eminem; Resto

"No Apologies" is a song by American rapper Eminem from the Shady Records compilation album Eminem Presents: The Re-Up (2006). Written and produced by Eminem and Luis Resto, the song shows Eminem addressing his music career to date and public reputation, defending his artistry from critics in an aggressive and hostile tone over a piano and string–driven instrumental. Though sections of the song were written as far back as 2002, it was released as the closing song of Eminem Presents: The Re-Up on December 5, 2006.

"No Apologies" received mixed reviews from music critics; whilst many commended Eminem's emotional sincerity and the quality of his rapping, others found his self-critique excessively paranoid, misdirected or overbearing. Following the release of Eminem Presents: The Re-Up, "No Apologies" charted on the US Billboard Bubbling Under Hot 100 Singles chart for a single week, peaking at number 21.

== Background and composition ==
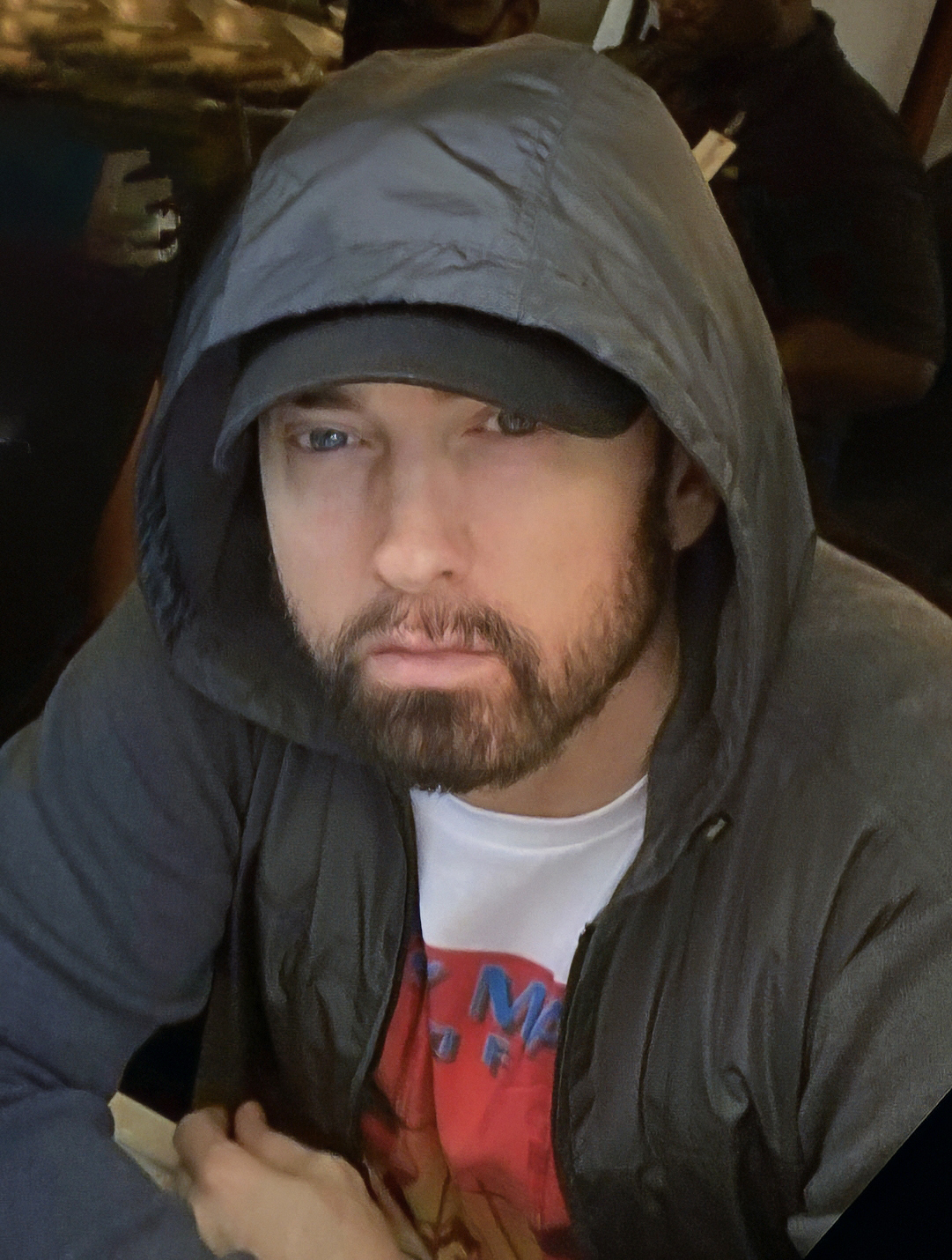
On "No Apologies", Eminem discusses how music critics and the public have viewed his artistic output and personal behaviour.

"No Apologies" was written and produced by Eminem and Luis Resto, and recorded by Mike Strange and Tony Campana at 54 Sound Studios in Detroit, where Eminem and Steve King also carried out the mixing. Resto also provided keyboards, and King bass and guitar. Prior to the song's release, Eminem had previously used two of its verses in freestyles; one had been premiered during his appearance on the hip-hop TV show Rap City in 2002. The final song on Eminem Presents: The Re-Up, it is one of the album's two Eminem solo songs, along with "Public Enemy #1".

Over a "maudlin" instrumental piano loop that features a "lumbering, yet restrained" bass and synthetic strings, Eminem's lyrics on "No Apologies" see him attacking his critics and reflecting on his personal life to date, as well as confronting his mortality. Nick Flan of Prefix Magazine wrote that the song shows Eminem "[continuing] his reflective and hostile phase... where he both dismisses and highlights his personal issues", whilst Dorian Lynskey of The Guardian called the lyrics "the sound of someone sealing off his emotions and armouring himself against the world", suggesting that Eminem appears resigned to his declining artistic relevance with lines such as "I'm an MC / This is how I'm supposed to be / Cold as a G / My heart's frozen / It don't even beat", and that the song "promises not retirement but a kind of retreat". Serena Kim of the Los Angeles Times similarly wrote that Eminem seeks to defiantly absolve himself of "any responsibility for the mean things he says", highlighting the line "No remorse for me like there was no recourse for me".

Eminem further explores the impact of his music career on his psyche with the lines "I'd be a savage beast, if I ain't had this outlet to salvage me inside... I'd be exploding, soaked in self-loathing and mourning, so I'm warning...". Describing the song as "gloomy" for The New York Times, Kelefa Sanneh cited "No Apologies" as an example of Eminem "recycling old themes... and even, maybe, old lines" in an attempt "to recover that old swagger and excitement" of his earlier work, in particular noting the line "He's able to spill raps long after he's killed / That's a real MC, got you feelin' me" for its similarity to one from his 2002 song "'Till I Collapse" ("'Till I collapse, I'm spillin' these raps, long as you feel 'em"). The line "You fuckers are not ready, 'cause I got jelly, like Beyoncé's pot belly" has Beyoncé's name backmasked on all versions of the song.

== Reception ==
"No Apologies" received generally mixed reviews from critics, with a wide range of responses to Eminem's self-reflection throughout the song. Gary Graff of Billboard described "No Apologies" as one of the "most intriguing moments" on Eminem Presents: The Re-Up, calling it "characteristically defiant". Singling it out as one of the album's best tracks, Michael Endelmen of Entertainment Weekly lauded it as "a breathless rant that is as gripping as it is disturbing". David Jeffries of AllMusic considered "No Apologies" to be Eminem's "shining moment" on the album, noting that "the man's lyrical dexterity is on display for the soul-searching closer". Jeffries nevertheless found Eminem's targeting of his critics ineffective, commenting "it didn't really seem like Em was getting a critical drubbing in 2006".

In contrast, Jayson Greene of Stylus Magazine called "No Apologies" a "nauseating display of empty self-congratulation... worthy of Liza Minelli [sic]", criticizing the "bottomless self-pity and narcissism" of Eminem's lyrics. Spence Abbott of IGN found the lyrics "captivating" but was unconvinced by Eminem's contrast of his defiance and self-doubt, writing that the song "still shows Em to be an artist in conflict, still unable to ignore the critics and haters, floating between angry boasts and emotional psychosis". He still praised the "hypnotic" production for establishing "an immersive yet overwhelmingly melancholy vibe". Reflecting on Eminem's rapping throughout Eminem Presents: The Re-Up for Rolling Stone, Robert Christgau felt that "only the final two minutes" of "No Apologies" matched "the brilliance we once took for granted". Andy Gill of The Independent did not consider Eminem's "unrepentant attitude" on "No Apologies" a "whole-hearted mea culpa" for his previous controversial behavior that had attracted criticism, but felt that it "does suggest access to reserves of self-knowledge that most rappers couldn't reach", arguing that Eminem displays his "more theatrical gifts" in his two solo tracks on Eminem Presents: The Re-Up.

=== Legacy ===
In a retrospective review for Complex, Max Tenenbaum called "No Apologies" a "diamond in the rough" of Eminem Presents: The Re-Up, praising it as "a rare moment where Em offers something raw and compelling". Mitch Findlay of HotNewHipHop ranked it as the eighth best Eminem song of all time in 2022, suggesting that Eminem's "raw take" had provided a reminder of his talents at a time when he was undergoing considerable personal tumult with many considering his music to be in decline: "For the first time in a minute, Em sounded like his old self, giving fans hope that the potential GOAT was waiting for his second wind".

== Credits and personnel ==
The credits for "No Apologies" are adapted from the liner notes of Eminem Presents: The Re-Up.

Studio locations

- Mastered at Bernie Grundman Mastering, Los Angeles, California.
- Mixed and recorded at 54 Sound Studios, Detroit, Michigan.

Personnel

- Eminem – mixing, production, songwriting, vocals
- Luis Resto – keyboards, production, songwriting
- Mike Strange – recording engineer
- Tony Campana – recording engineer
- Steve King – bass, guitar, mixing
- Bernie Grundman – mastering

== Charts ==
Chart performance for "No Apologies"
Chart (2006)	Peak position
US Bubbling Under Hot 100 (Billboard)	21
