= Elevator (Eminem song) =

Promotional single by Eminem

from the album Relapse: Refill
- Released: December 15, 2009 (digital)
- Recorded: 2006–2008
- Genre: Hip hop
- Length: 4:53
- Label: Shady; Aftermath; Interscope
- Songwriters: Marshall Mathers; Luis Resto
- Producer: Eminem

"Elevator" is a song by American rapper Eminem, featured on his 2009 album Relapse: Refill, the re-release of his album Relapse. "Elevator" was the second promotional single released on December 15, released the same day as "Hell Breaks Loose". On the issue of January 2, 2010, "Elevator" debuted at #67 on the Billboard Hot 100.

== Controversy ==
The lyrics of the song struck controversy, as Eminem raps this message to former *NSYNCer Lance Bass: "Sorry Lance, Mr. Lambert and Aiken ain't gonna make it... They get so mad when I call them both faggots...." Adam Lambert, the American Idol season 8 runner-up said on Twitter: "Wow Eminem mentioned me in a song? I must be doin something right," and "Even if he used the f word. Whatev.

== Track listing ==
No.	Title	Writer(s)	Producer(s)	Length
1.	"Elevator" (Explicit Album Version)	Marshall Mathers; Luis Resto	Eminem	4:53

== Charts ==
Chart (2010)	Peak position
Canada (Canadian Hot 100)	59
US Billboard Hot 100	67
