= Darkness (Eminem song) =

2020 single by Eminem

Single by Eminem

from the album Music to Be Murdered By
- Released: January 17, 2020
- Genre: Hip-hop; political hip-hop
- Length: 5:38
- Label: Aftermath; Shady; Interscope
- Songwriters: Marshall Mathers; Luis Resto; Paul Simon; Ryan Montgomery
- Producers: Eminem; Luis Resto; Royce da 5'9"

Eminem singles chronology
"Homicide" (2019)	"Darkness" (2020)	"Godzilla" (2020)

Music video
- "Darkness" on YouTube

"Darkness" is a song by American rapper Eminem that was included in his eleventh studio album, Music to Be Murdered By (2020). The track's related music video was the first visual clip released on behalf of the album. "Darkness" came out as a lead single simultaneously with the rest of the album on January 17, 2020, with no prior announcement having been made. In terms of its lyrics, the song recounts the 2017 mass shooting in Las Vegas.

In contrast to multiple previous songs commercially released by the artist during his career, "Darkness" is an explicitly socio-political protest song that condemns gun violence in the United States while additionally invoking the related cultural issues in America of psychological anxiety and substance abuse. Eminem also directly encourages his fans' efforts to register to vote. The song and its related video have been described as "bleak", "chilling", "dark", and "stark", given its emotional tone. Eminem takes on multiple perspectives within the production and prominently includes the point-of-view of the shooter himself in his rapping.

"Darkness" has received mixed critical responses given its explicit content. U.S. news service The Atlantic stated in an article that it can be alternately assessed as glorifying gun violence and also as fighting against it, with journalist Spencer Kornhaber arguing that Eminem's deliberate embodying of the mass shooter's point-of-view throughout "Darkness" made it ethically flawed overall. Commentary on Billboard described the release as "powerful" and also labeled Eminem with the title of a "Rap God". CNN.com published an article regarding the song as "a poignant call for expanded gun control", noting the broader context of the artist's "outspoken" past ventures into U.S. politics such as criticizing the invasion of Iraq and other violent actions undertaken by then President George W. Bush in the 2000s.

== Background and content ==
Commentator Eddie Fu, a staff writer at the musical publication Genius, wrote: "The track channels the perspective of Stephen Paddock— who killed 60 people in the 2017 Las Vegas shooting— to make a point about gun control." Journalist Spencer Kornhaber noted for The Atlantic: "The song and the video do not simply restage the massacre, though. Eminem is attempting a double entendre, in which most of the lyrics could equally refer to the rapper himself, sitting in a hotel room, nervous before a concert."

Besides being an explicitly socio-political protest song that condemns gun violence in the United States, "Darkness" additionally invokes the related cultural issues in America of psychological anxiety and substance abuse. Eminem added a promotional statement to the music video supporting his fans' efforts to register to vote as well. The song and its related video have been described as "bleak", "chilling", "dark", and "stark", given its emotional tone. In addition, Eminem takes on multiple perspectives within the production. This prominently includes taking the point-of-view of the shooter himself in his rapping, Eminem citing psychological tensions in the murderer's life such as the alienation between father-and-son.

The outro explicitly references other violent incidents beyond what happened in Las Vegas, Nevada, particularly noting the headline-making attacks in both Annapolis, Maryland and Dayton, Ohio. As well, the opening section of "Darkness" brings up the history of the city in popular culture. Eminem raps that he "[f]eels like I’m loathing in Las Vegas", with this referring to the countercultural writing Fear And Loathing In Las Vegas and its movie adaptation.

"Darkness" interpolates the song "The Sound of Silence" by American musical duo Simon & Garfunkel, which had appeared on that group's 1964 album Wednesday Morning, 3 A.M. The prior track's opening line, which goes "Hello, darkness, my old friend", also is prominently emphasized in Eminem's song.

== Music video ==
On January 17, 2020, a music video of the song was released on Eminem's YouTube channel. The video follows the same plot as the lyrics. The first two verses alternate between showing Eminem in a dark room wearing a hoodie and an unidentified person in a hotel room wearing the same hoodie, surrounded by alcohol and ammunition. At the beginning of the third verse, the person takes off the hood and reveals himself to be Stephen Paddock, the man behind the Las Vegas shooting, before opening fire on the concert-goers from the hotel window. As police try to break into his room, the shooter trains his sidearm at the front door, before he then shoots himself in the head.

The video ends with overlapping news feeds regarding gun violence, and the closing message: "When will it end? When enough people care. Register to vote at vote.gov. Make your voice heard and help change the gun laws in America."

== Reactions and responses ==
"Darkness" has received mixed responses from music critics and other commentators given its explicit content. U.S. news service The Atlantic stated in an article that it can be alternately assessed as glorifying gun violence and also as fighting against it. With journalist Spencer Kornhaber arguing that Eminem's deliberate embodying of the mass shooter's point-of-view throughout "Darkness" made it ethically flawed overall, the publication highlighted a negative social context given that "the internet rewards audiovisual spectacle" and thus reenacting crimes in a dramatic fashion has nuanced effects.

Commentary on Billboard described the release as "powerful" and also labeled Eminem with the title of a "Rap God". CNN published an article regarding the song as "a poignant call for expanded gun control", noting the broader context of the artist's "outspoken" past ventures into U.S. politics. This has included criticizing the invasion of Iraq and other violent actions undertaken by then President George W. Bush in the 2000s.

Analyzing the music video specifically, its filmmaking style has been described as "realistic" and involving a production that appears "disturbing for some viewers".

== Charts ==
Chart (2020)	Peak position
Australia (ARIA)	32
Austria (Ö3 Austria Top 40)	31
Belgium (Ultratip Bubbling Under Flanders)	8
Belgium Urban (Ultratop Flanders)	22
Canada Hot 100 (Billboard)	10
Czech Republic Singles Digital (ČNS IFPI)	18
France (SNEP)	91
Germany (GfK)	47
Greece International Digital Singles (IFPI)	24
Hungary (Single Top 40)	29
Hungary (Stream Top 40)	22
Ireland (IRMA)	22
Italy (FIMI)	57
Lithuania (AGATA)	36
Netherlands (Single Top 100)	52
New Zealand (Recorded Music NZ)	35
Norway (VG-lista)	36
Portugal (AFP)	58
Scottish Singles Sales (Official Charts)	34
Slovakia Singles Digital (ČNS IFPI)	19
Sweden (Sverigetopplistan)	58
Switzerland (Schweizer Hitparade)	13
UK Singles (Official Charts)	17
UK Hip Hop/R&B (Official Charts)	9
US Billboard Hot 100	28
US Hot R&B/Hip-Hop Songs (Billboard)	15
US Rolling Stone Top 100	8

== Certifications ==
Region	Certification	Certified units/sales
Australia (ARIA)	Gold	35,000^{‡}
Brazil (Pro-Música Brasil)	Gold	20,000^{‡}
New Zealand (RMNZ)	Gold	15,000^{‡}
United Kingdom (BPI)	Silver	200,000^{‡}
United States (RIAA)	Gold	500,000^{‡}
^{‡} Sales+streaming figures based on certification alone.

== See also ==
- 2020 in American music
- Eminem discography
- Gun culture in the United States
- Gun violence in the United States
- Murder ballad
- Protest music
- Surprise musical release
