= Alfred's Theme =

2020 song by Eminem

Song by Eminem

from the album Music to Be Murdered By: Side B
- Released: December 18, 2020
- Recorded: 2020
- Genre: Hip hop
- Length: 5:39
- Label: Shady; Aftermath; Interscope
- Songwriters: Marshall Mathers; Luis Resto; Charles Gounod
- Producer: Marshall Mathers

Music video
- "Alfred's Theme" on YouTube

"Alfred's Theme" is a song by American rapper Eminem and the third track from the deluxe edition of his eleventh studio album Music to Be Murdered By via Interscope, Aftermath, and Shady Records. It was both produced and written by Marshall Mathers, Luis Resto, and Charles Gounod. It samples the theme song to the anthology television series Alfred Hitchcock Presents.

The song peaked at number 85 on the Canadian Hot 100.

== Music video ==
Marshall Mathers
(@Eminem)
tweeted:

"And my thoughts are like nines cocked / Every line's obscene, pervertedest mind, got the dirtiest rhyme stocked" Face with symbols over mouth Limited run of #AlfredsTheme lyric coffee table books are on the site. DANGER: KEEP OUT OF REACH OF CHILDREN - http://shady.SR/AlfredsThemeLysThemeLyricBook

May 5, 2021

The lyrical music video for "Alfred's Theme" was released on May 5, 2021 and features animation similar to "Tone Deaf". It pays homage to Alfred Hitchcock films including Vertigo and Psycho. On the same day, an illustrated lyric book based on the music video was announced on Twitter which could be purchased on Eminem's online store.

The segments in the music video includes Slim Shady looking through his binoculars (Rear Window), a black bird pulling out an eye of a corpse (The Birds), Shady running down the staircases (Blackmail), and stabbing a person (Psycho).

== Personnel ==
- Marshall Mathers – main artist, vocals, songwriter, producer
- Charles Gounod – writer
- Luis Resto – songwriter, keyboards
- Brent Kolatalo – recorder
- Mike Strange – recorder, mixer
- Tony Campana – recorder
- Dominic Rivinius – brass, percussion
- Ken Lewis – mixer

== Charts ==
Chart performance for "Alfred's Theme"
Chart (2021)	Peak position
Canada Hot 100 (Billboard)	85
