= Godzilla (Eminem song) =

Single by Eminem featuring Juice Wrld

from the album Music to Be Murdered By
- Released: January 31, 2020
- Recorded: 2019
- Genre: Hip-hop; trap
- Length: 3:30
- Label: Aftermath; Shady; Interscope
- Songwriters: Marshall Mathers; Jarad Higgins; David Doman; Luis Resto; Alejandro Villasana
- Producers: Eminem; D. A. Doman

Eminem singles chronology
"Darkness" (2020)	"Godzilla" (2020)	"The Adventures of Moon Man & Slim Shady" (2020)

Juice Wrld singles chronology
"Let Me Know (I Wonder Why Freestyle)" (2019)	"Godzilla" (2020)	"Suicidal (Remix)" (2020)

Music video
- "Godzilla" on YouTube

Audio sample
- file; help

"Godzilla" is a song by American rapper Eminem, released as a single on January 31, 2020, from the former's eleventh studio album Music to Be Murdered By (2020). The song features fellow American rapper Juice Wrld, who performs the song’s chorus. The song was Juice WRLD's first posthumous release following his death the previous month in December 2019. It topped the charts in Finland, Ireland, and the United Kingdom and reached the top ten in Australia, Austria, Canada, the Czech Republic, Denmark, Hungary, Italy, Lithuania, New Zealand, Norway, Slovakia, Sweden, Switzerland, and the United States.

== Background ==
Juice Wrld's feature on the track marked his first posthumous release following his fatal seizure resulting from a drug overdose on December 8, 2019. Eminem's speed run at the end of his third verse on the track holds the record for his fastest rap verse, rapping 224 words in 31 seconds at 10.65 syllables per second. Eminem surpassed his own records held by his feature on Nicki Minaj and Labrinth's song "Majesty" from the album Queen, where he rapped 10.3 syllables per second, and his 2013 song "Rap God", where he rapped 9.6 syllables per second.

== Music video ==
On March 4, 2020, a lyric video for the song was released. On March 8, Eminem released a snippet of the music video, partnered with Lyrical Lemonade. The video shows Eminem walking through a warehouse while periodically drinking alcoholic beverages and getting drunk. The music video, directed by Cole Bennett, released on March 9, featuring appearances by Mike Tyson, Dr. Dre, and a dedication to Juice Wrld at the end. As of April 2026, the song has over 784 million views on YouTube. The video received mixed reviews.

== Composition ==
The song is written in the key of E-flat minor, with a tempo of 166 (or 83) beats per minute, with a chord progression of E♭m-G♭.

== Chart performance ==
"Godzilla" was a success in the United States and Europe. It debuted at number one in Finland and on both the UK Singles Chart and the Irish Singles Chart, becoming Eminem's tenth and ninth number-one single in the UK and Ireland, respectively, as well as the first for Juice Wrld posthumously and in total in both countries. It also went to number two in Flanders, the Czech Republic, Hungary, New Zealand, and Slovakia. It went to number three in both artists' homeland, the United States, and went top ten in 20 regions. Outside Europe, it saw moderate success in Lebanon and Singapore, peaking inside the top 20 in those regions.

== Use in media ==
In December 2023, the song was featured during Fortnite's The Big Bang event, together with a skin based on Eminem's alter ego, Marshall Never More, performing based on the Godzilla theme.

This song also makes an appearance in Beat Saber’s Hip Hop Mixtape.

As of January 5, 2026, it serves as the current theme song for WWE Raw, where it debuted during the Raw on Netflix Anniversary Show.

== Awards and nominations ==
Year	Ceremony	Award	Result
2020	MTV Video Music Awards	Video of the Year	Nominated
2020	MTV Video Music Awards	Best Hip-Hop	Nominated

== Charts ==
=== Weekly charts ===
Chart (2020–2023)	Peak position
Australia (ARIA)	3
Austria (Ö3 Austria Top 40)	6
Belgium (Ultratip Bubbling Under Flanders)	2
Belgium Urban (Ultratop Flanders)	16
Belgium (Ultratip Bubbling Under Wallonia)	8
Canada Hot 100 (Billboard)	3
Czech Republic Singles Digital (ČNS IFPI)	2
Denmark (Tracklisten)	4
Finland (Suomen virallinen lista)	1
France (SNEP)	45
Germany (GfK)	16
Global 200 (Billboard)	124
Greece International (IFPI)	2
Hungary (Single Top 40)	5
Hungary (Stream Top 40)	1
Iceland (Tónlistinn)	16
Ireland (IRMA)	1
Italy (FIMI)	7
Lebanon (Lebanese Top 20)	15
Lithuania (AGATA)	8
Netherlands (Single Top 100)	11
New Zealand (Recorded Music NZ)	2
Norway (VG-lista)	3
Poland (Polish Streaming Top 100)	100
Portugal (AFP)	12
Romania (Airplay 100)	59
Scottish Singles Sales (Official Charts)	16
Singapore (RIAS)	17
Slovakia Singles Digital (ČNS IFPI)	2
Spain (Promusicae)	80
Sweden (Sverigetopplistan)	7
Switzerland (Schweizer Hitparade)	4
UK Singles (Official Charts)	1
UK Hip Hop/R&B (Official Charts)	1
US Billboard Hot 100	3
US Hot R&B/Hip-Hop Songs (Billboard)	3
US Rhythmic Airplay (Billboard)	13
US Rolling Stone Top 100	3

=== Year-end charts ===
Chart (2020)	Position
Australia (ARIA)	33
Austria (Ö3 Austria Top 40)	60
Canada (Canadian Hot 100)	31
Denmark (Tracklisten)	58
Hungary (Single Top 40)	97
Hungary (Stream Top 40)	21
Ireland (IRMA)	36
New Zealand (Recorded Music NZ)	46
Sweden (Sverigetopplistan)	71
Switzerland (Schweizer Hitparade)	68
UK Singles (OCC)	27
US Billboard Hot 100	62
US Hot R&B/Hip-Hop Songs (Billboard)	29

== Certifications ==
Region	Certification	Certified units/sales
Australia (ARIA)	6× Platinum	420,000^{‡}
Austria (IFPI Austria)	2× Platinum	60,000^{‡}
Brazil (Pro-Música Brasil)	Diamond	160,000^{‡}
Canada (Music Canada)	2× Platinum	160,000^{‡}
Denmark (IFPI Danmark)	Platinum	90,000^{‡}
France (SNEP)	Diamond	333,333^{‡}
Germany (BVMI)	Platinum	400,000^{‡}
Italy (FIMI)	Platinum	70,000^{‡}
New Zealand (RMNZ)	4× Platinum	120,000^{‡}
Poland (ZPAV)	3× Platinum	150,000^{‡}
Portugal (AFP)	Platinum	10,000^{‡}
Spain (Promusicae)	Platinum	60,000^{‡}
United Kingdom (BPI)	2× Platinum	1,200,000^{‡}
United States (RIAA)	3× Platinum	3,000,000^{‡}
Streaming
Greece (IFPI Greece)	2× Platinum	4,000,000^{†}
^{‡} Sales+streaming figures based on certification alone.^{†} Streaming-only figures based on certification alone.

== Release history ==
Region	Date	Format	Label	Ref.
Italy	January 31, 2020	Contemporary hit radio	Universal	
United States	February 18, 2020	Contemporary hit radio	Shady; Aftermath; Interscope	
United States	February 18, 2020	Rhythmic contemporary radio	Shady; Aftermath; Interscope	
