= Killer (Eminem song) =

2021 single by Eminem

- Remix cover

Promotional single by Eminem featuring Jack Harlow and Cordae

from the album Music to Be Murdered By – Side B
- Released: December 18, 2020 (original) May 28, 2021 (remix)
- Recorded: 2020–2021
- Length: 3:15 (original); 3:57 (remix)
- Label: Shady; Aftermath; Interscope
- Songwriters: Marshall Mathers; D.A. Doman; Ezemdi Chikwendu
- Producer: D.A. Got That Dope Lonestarrmuzik

"Killer" is a song by American rapper Eminem from the deluxe edition of his eleventh studio album Music to Be Murdered By. The song was released as the album's thirteenth track on December 18, 2020, via Shady Records along with the rest of Music to Be Murdered By – Side B.

On May 27, 2021, Eminem released a tweet revealing that the remix would be released, stating "You know we had to do a remix, right?", while previewing a snippet of the song. The remix was released the following day, featuring fellow rappers Jack Harlow and Cordae, marking the first collaboration between the three rappers.

== Personnel ==
Credits adapted from Tidal

- Marshall Mathers – main artist, vocals, songwriter
- Jackman Harlow – featured artist, vocals, songwriter
- Cordae Dunston – featured artist, vocals, songwriter
- David Doman - producer
- Ezemdi Chikwu - composer, songwriter
- Luis Resto – keyboards, additional performer
- Mike Strange – mixer, recording engineer, studio personnel
- Joe Strange – recording engineer, studio personnel
- Nickie Jon Pabon – vocal engineer, vocal mix

== Charts ==
Chart performance for "Killer"
Chart (2021)	Peak position
Australia (ARIA)	92
Canada Hot 100 (Billboard)	37
Global 200 (Billboard)	67
Ireland (IRMA)	64
New Zealand Hot Singles (RMNZ)	2
Sweden Heatseeker (Sverigetopplistan)	7
UK Singles (OCC)	77
US Billboard Hot 100	62
US Hot R&B/Hip-Hop Songs (Billboard)	21

== Certifications ==
Certifications for "Killer"
Region	Certification	Certified units/sales
Australia (ARIA)	Gold	35,000^{‡}
New Zealand (RMNZ)	Gold	15,000^{‡}
United States (RIAA)	Platinum	1,000,000^{‡}
^{‡} Sales+streaming figures based on certification alone.
