= Those Kinda Nights =

2020 song by Eminem featuring Ed Sheeran

Song by Eminem featuring Ed Sheeran

from the album Music to Be Murdered By
- Released: January 17, 2020
- Studio: Effigy Studios (Detroit, MI)
- Genre: Hip hop
- Length: 2:57
- Label: Shady; Aftermath; Interscope
- Songwriters: Marshall Mathers; Ed Sheeran; Fred Gibson; David Domain; Luis Resto; Adrienne Byrne
- Producers: d.a. got that dope; Eminem (co-.); Fred (add.)

"Those Kinda Nights" is a song by American rapper Eminem from his eleventh studio album Music to Be Murdered By. It was released as the album's fifth track on January 17, 2020, via Shady Records along with the album. Recording sessions took place at Effigy Studios in Detroit with Mike Strange. Co-produced by Em, the production was handled by D.A Got That Dope with additional production by Fred Again. It features English singer-songwriter Ed Sheeran performing the hook, marking the third collaboration between the two artists, after 2017's "River" and 2019's "Remember The Name".

== Personnel ==
- Marshall Mathers – main artist, vocals, songwriter, co-producer
- Ed Sheeran – featured artist, vocals, songwriter
- David Domain – songwriter, producer
- Fred Gibson – songwriter, additional producer
- Luis Resto – songwriter, additional keyboards
- Bizarre – additional vocals
- Adrienne "Aeb" Byrne – songwriter, additional instruments & programming
- Mike Strange – recording, mixing
- Joe Strange – additional engineering
- Tony Campana – additional engineering

== Charts ==
Chart (2020)	Peak position
Australia (ARIA)	35
Austria (Ö3 Austria Top 40)	37
Canada Hot 100 (Billboard)	22
Denmark (Tracklisten)	29
Finland (Suomen virallinen lista)	8
France (SNEP)	115
Greece (IFPI)	21
Iceland (Tónlistinn)	34
Italy (FIMI)	37
Netherlands (Single Top 100)	49
New Zealand (Recorded Music NZ)	30
Norway (VG-lista)	15
Sweden (Sverigetopplistan)	20
Switzerland (Schweizer Hitparade)	12
UK Singles (Official Charts)	12
UK Hip Hop/R&B (Official Charts)	8
US Billboard Hot 100	31
US Hot R&B/Hip-Hop Songs (Billboard)	17

== Certifications ==
Region	Certification	Certified units/sales
Australia (ARIA)	Gold	35,000^{‡}
New Zealand (RMNZ)	Gold	15,000^{‡}
United Kingdom (BPI)	Silver	200,000^{‡}
United States (RIAA)	Gold	500,000^{‡}
^{‡} Sales+streaming figures based on certification alone.
