= Public image of Eminem =

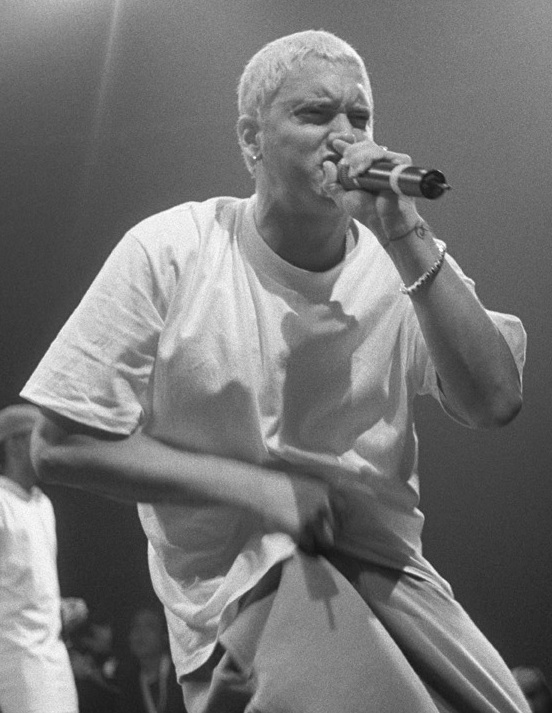
Eminem performing in 1999

Throughout his career, American rapper Eminem has received recognition as a public figure. His transgressive work during the late 1990s and early 2000s made him a controversial figure, as well as a symbol of popular angst of the American underclass.

Eminem has created numerous alter egos that he uses in his songs for different rapping styles and subject matter, most importantly Slim Shady. He has had several lyrical feuds with other musical artists, creating numerous diss tracks. Some of his lyrics have been criticized as being homophobic, though the rapper continuously denied the accusations. Eminem has also had several legal issues, the first one at the age of 20.

== Mainstream perceptions ==
In 2002, the BBC said that the perception of Eminem as a "modern-day William Shakespeare" was comparable to the reception of American singer Bob Dylan: "Not since Bob Dylan's heyday in the mid-1960s has an artist's output been subjected to such intense academic scrutiny as an exercise in contemporary soul-searching. U.S. critics point to [Eminem's] vivid portraits of disenfranchised lives—using the stark, direct language of the street—as an accurate reflection of social injustice." In addition, the BBC highlighted that, "Where parents once recoiled in horror [to his music], there now seems a greater willingness to acknowledge a music that is striking such a chord among the American young, angry white underclass." Dan Ozzi of Vice highlighted that Eminem during the early 2000s was "the one artist high school kids seemed to unanimously connect with ... he represented everything high school years are about: blind rage, misguided rebellion, adolescent frustration. He was like a human middle finger. An X-rated Dennis the Menace for a dial-up modem generation."

Concerning the controversy surrounding Eminem due to his transgressive music, American musician Madonna said in 2003, "I like the fact that Eminem is brash and angry and politically incorrect ... He's stirring things up, he's provoking a discussion, he's making people's blood boil. He's reflecting what's going on in society right now. That is what art is supposed to do." Fellow musician Stevie Wonder added "Rap to me is a modern blues—a statement of how and where people are at ... I think art is a reflection of our society, and people don't like to confront the realities in society ... But until we really confront the truth, we are going to have a Tupac or Eminem or Biggie Smalls to remind us about it—and thank God. They force people to look at realities in society."

== Alter egos ==
Eminem uses alter egos in his songs for different rapping styles and subject matter, including Slim Shady and Ken Kaniff, among others. Slim Shady is the controversial and rebellious alter ego of Eminem, introduced in his 1997 extended play Slim Shady EP. Conceived during a period of personal and professional struggle, Slim Shady allowed Eminem to express his darker, more aggressive thoughts through exaggerated and often violent lyrical content. This persona embodies the chaotic, satirical side of Eminem's music, pushing boundaries with provocative, sometimes offensive, themes, which blend fiction and reality. The use of Slim Shady is shown in The Slim Shady LP, The Marshall Mathers LP, The Eminem Show, Encore, Relapse, The Marshall Mathers LP 2, Revival, Kamikaze, Music to Be Murdered By, and The Death of Slim Shady (Coup de Grâce).

Slim Shady's influence on Eminem's career is significant. His shock-value content helped skyrocket the rapper to fame, but also attracted criticism and legal challenges, particularly due to songs like "'97 Bonnie and Clyde" and "Kim", where he addresses deeply personal and often disturbing subjects, such as family conflicts and imagined violence. Despite the controversy, the Slim Shady character is credited with much of Eminem's early success, but over time, the persona also contributed to the rapper's personal struggles, including substance abuse.

Another character is Ken Kaniff, a gay man who pokes fun at Eminem's songs. Ken was created and originally played by fellow Detroit rapper Aristotle on The Slim Shady LP, where Kaniff makes a prank call to Eminem. An argument after the album's release prompted Eminem to use the Kaniff character on The Marshall Mathers LP and later albums (except Encore, Recovery, Revival, Kamikaze and Music to Be Murdered By). Aristotle, angry with Eminem's use of his character, released a mixtape in his Kaniff persona ridiculing him titled "The Ken Kaniff Show".

== Comparisons with other artists ==
As a white performer prominent in a genre influenced by black artists, Eminem has been compared, much to his chagrin, to Elvis Presley, and has lyrically been compared to Bob Dylan. Rapper Asher Roth has been compared to Eminem and Roth devoted a song on his album ("As I Em") to him, which Eminem took offense to. The accomplished trumpeter Nicholas Payton has called Eminem "the Bix Beiderbecke of hip-hop".

== Feuds ==
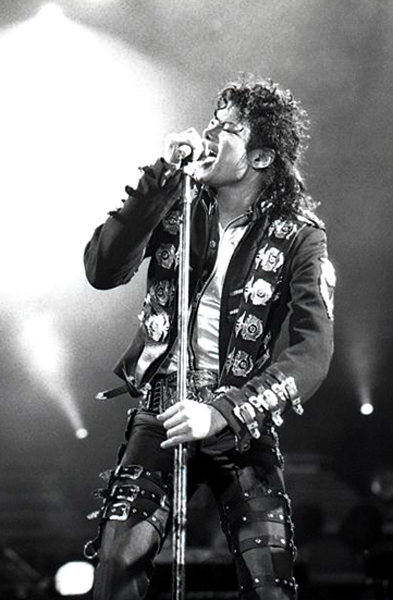
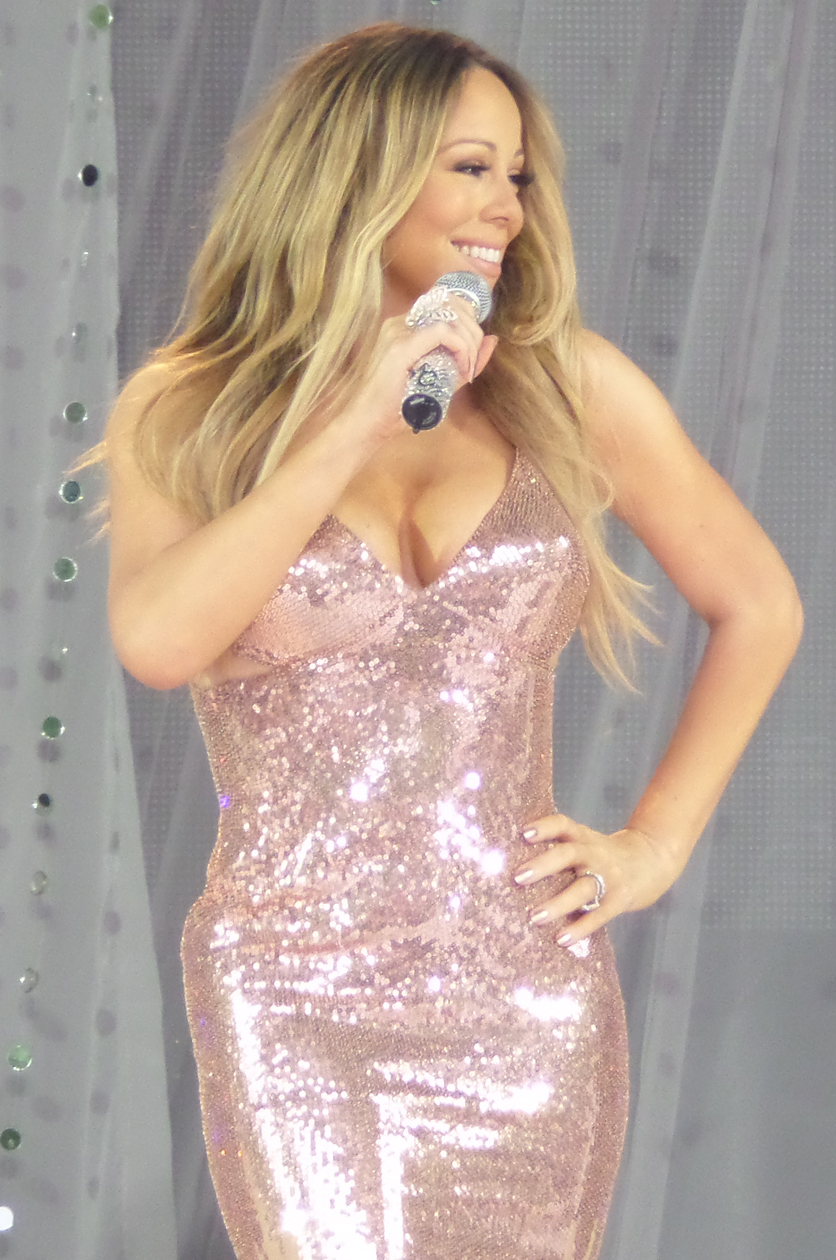
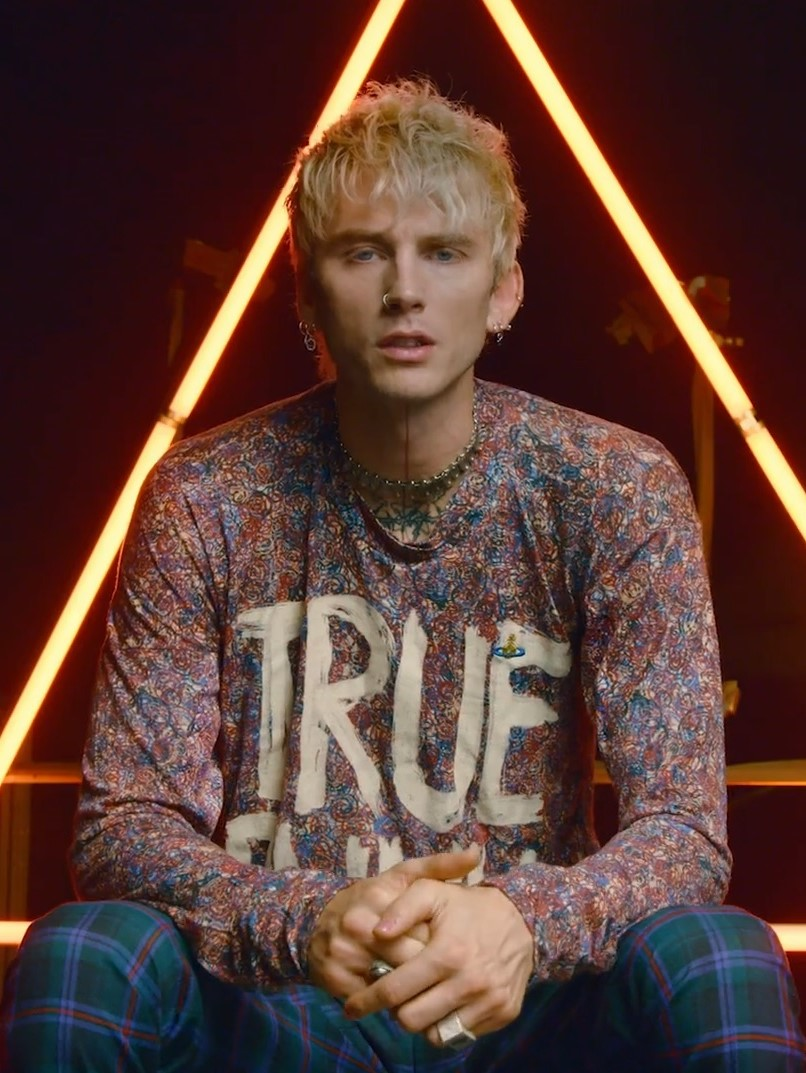
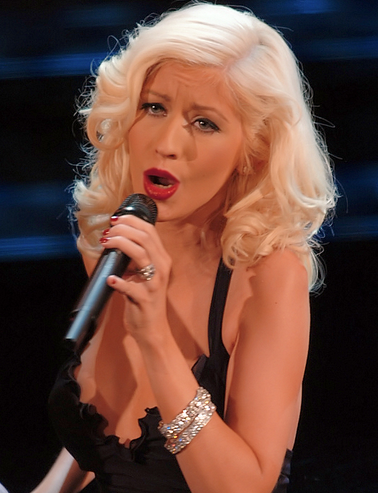
From left to right: Michael Jackson, Mariah Carey, Machine Gun Kelly and Christina Aguilera have all had highly publicized feuds with Eminem.

Eminem has had lyrical feuds during his career with many recording artists, including Christina Aguilera, Machine Gun Kelly, Everlast, Cage, Insane Clown Posse, Will Smith, Miilkbone, Mariah Carey, Nick Cannon, Nelly, Limp Bizkit, Benzino, Ja Rule, Vanilla Ice, Canibus, Jermaine Dupri, Joe Budden, and Lord Jamar.

=== Insane Clown Posse ===
The feud with fellow Detroit hip-hop duo Insane Clown Posse began in 1997, when Eminem was throwing a party to promote his debut EP, Slim Shady EP. He gave Joseph Bruce (aka Violent J from Insane Clown Posse) a flyer which stated "Featuring appearances by Esham, Kid Rock, and ICP (maybe)". Bruce asked why Eminem was promoting a possible Insane Clown Posse appearance without first contacting the group. Eminem explained, "It says 'maybe.' Maybe you will be there; I don't know. That's why I'm asking you right now. You guys comin' to my release party, or what?". Bruce, upset over not being consulted, responded, "Fuck no, I ain't coming to your party. We might have, if you would've asked us first, before putting us on the fuckin' flyer like this."

Eminem took Bruce's response as a personal offense, subsequently attacking the group in radio interviews. Bruce and Utsler responded with a parody diss track of Eminem's "My Name Is" entitled "Slim Anus" and other tracks including "Nuttin' But a Bitch Thang" and "Please Don't Hate Me". Eminem insulted Insane Clown Posse on various tracks from his album The Marshall Mathers LP (2000), including "Marshall Mathers" and "Ken Kaniff". In 2002, Eminem briefly dissed them on his single "Business" from The Eminem Show.

Insane Clown Posse talked about the feud being squashed in an interview with MTV, saying that Proof squashed the conflict in 2005, which was followed by a bowling game between members of D12 and Psychopathic Records. Violent J stated that, "He contacted us and we had a bowling game—it was really cool. We're something different. They could have skipped over us and said forget them, but they included us and said let's squash it."

=== Canibus ===
The animus with rapper Canibus started when Canibus and Haitian musician Wyclef Jean confronted Eminem and asked him if he had ghost-written the track "The Ripper Strikes Back" by LL Cool J. Eminem denied that he wrote the track. After he was confronted, Eminem said Canibus was "rude" to him.

Two years later, Canibus went to see Eminem on the Warped Tour and apologized to him for his reaction and asked him if he still wanted to feature on the track "Phuck U" from his album 2000 B.C.. Eminem agreed, but when he heard the track, he thought it was directed at him and LL Cool J, and subsequently declined the offer. Shortly afterwards, Eminem released his third album The Marshall Mathers LP (2000) and Canibus decided to continue the "story" of Eminem's single "Stan". He titled the track "U Didn't Care" and it continued to take shots at Eminem. Eminem decided to take more shots at Canibus on his album The Eminem Show (2002) on tracks such as "Say What You Say", "When The Music Stops" and "Square Dance". Even though Canibus did not immediately respond to the tracks, Eminem continued to take shots at him, including "My Name", a track that Eminem was featured on from Xzibit's album Man vs. Machine (2002).

On November 19, 2002, Canibus responded with the track titled "Dr. C PhD". Over a year later, Eminem's track "Can-I-Bitch" leaked as a part of his bootleg mixtape Straight from the Lab. He attacked Canibus in a humorous matter. Since then the hostilities have cooled down, but Canibus tried to provoke a reignition of it when he leaked a track titled "Air Strike (Pop Killer)", that featured vocal parts of D12, where Canibus takes shots at Eminem and his deceased friend Proof. D12 member Swift responded to the record publicly and had the following to say about DZK (another rapper featured on the track). "[He] asked us to do a track with him when he already was teamed up with Canibus without us knowing. They dissed Em, took our verses, and added them to the song, so they can bring traffic and make it seem like we were turning on Em [...] as a desperate attempt to be heard after ducking and dodging Em for 7 years. It was a straight hoe move."

=== Christina Aguilera ===
Aguilera mentioned Eminem during an MTV special in 1999, noting that she took issue with some of his lyrics. Eminem first dissed Aguilera on "The Real Slim Shady" where he alleged that Aguilera had given oral sex to Carson Daly and Fred Durst. Aguilera's representative reported to the New York Daily News that it was "disgusting, offensive and above all, not true". She later referenced the feud at the 2000 MTV Video Music Awards while introducing Whitney Houston alongside Britney Spears who mentioned Eminem, at which point Aguilera dismissed him.

After the release of "Can't Hold Us Down" by Aguilera in 2002, critics noted its lyrical references to her feud with Eminem. The two met face to face at the 2002 MTV Video Music Awards where she presented him with the MTV Video Music Award for Best Male Video. In 2018, Eminem reintroduced the feud on his rap "Kick-Off" which mentioned her by name. Aguilera responded on Watch What Happens Live! with Andy Cohen that its "really in the past and [...] it was thirsty then and it's thirsty now".

=== Michael Jackson ===
The 2004 music video for "Just Lose It" generated controversy by parodying pop icon Michael Jackson's child molestation trial, plastic surgery and an incident in which Jackson's hair caught on fire while filming a Pepsi commercial in 1984. It was banned on the BET channel, after complaints from Benzino and others (but was later reinstated, as critics of the ban argued that Nelly's "Tip Drill" video could be seen). Both were only seen on BET: Uncut. However, MTV did not drop it, and the video became one of the most requested on the channel. A week after the release of "Just Lose It", Jackson called in to the radio show of Steve Harvey to report his displeasure with the video. "I am very angry at Eminem's depiction of me in his video", Jackson said in the interview. "I feel that it is outrageous and disrespectful. It is one thing to spoof, but it is another to be demeaning and insensitive." The singer continued: "I've admired Eminem as an artist, and was shocked by this. The video was inappropriate and disrespectful to me, my children, my family and the community at large." Many of Jackson's supporters and friends spoke out about the video, including Stevie Wonder, who called the video "kicking a man while he's down" and "bullshit", and Steve Harvey, who declared, "Eminem has lost his ghetto pass. We want the pass back."

=== Ja Rule ===
Eminem's conflict with rapper Ja Rule started after 50 Cent signed to Shady Records and Aftermath. Ja Rule stated that he had a problem with Eminem and Dr. Dre of signing someone he had conflict with. On November 19, Ja Rule and Irv Gotti were special guests on Star and Bucwild's morning show on Hot 97 NYC. Gotti claimed to have "legal documents" referring to an order of protection 50 Cent "has on him". Ja Rule threatened, that if 50 Cent released any diss track, he would take action towards his two producers. However, Dr. Dre was the one who produced 50 Cent's track "Back Down" in 2003 from the album Get Rich or Die Tryin', which included lyrics insulting not only Murder Inc., but also Ja Rule's family including his then-two-year-old son and seven-year-old daughter Britney Atkins as in the song, 50 Cent raps, "Your Mami, your Papi, that bitch you chasin' your lil dirty ass kids, I'll fuckin' erase them.".

The feud intensified when Ja Rule released a diss called "Loose Change", in which he took shots at 50 Cent as well as Eminem (calling him "Feminem") and Dr. Dre (accuse him of being "bisexual" and having a fetish for transvestites – "bringing transvestites home"). It includes also the lyrics insulting Eminem's family, including his then-seven-year-old daughter Hailie Jade: "Em you claim your mother's a crack head and Kim is a known slut, so what's Hailie gonna be when she grows up?". Eminem, along with D12 and Obie Trice, responded with the track "Doe Rae Me" (aka "Hailie's Revenge"). He also dissed Ja Rule on the songs "Bully" and "Hail Mary". On January 13, 2025, a diss track by Eminem aimed at Ja Rule and Suge Knight, titled "Smack You", leaked online. The track was recorded c. 2003, during the height of the feud, but ultimately remained unreleased.

=== Benzino and The Source magazine ===
In 2003, The Source co-owner Benzino released a diss single titled "Pull Your Skirt Up" which took aim at Eminem. The track attacked Eminem's "street cred" and accused him of being a tool of the music industry. Eminem had been discovered by The Source after writer Rigo Morales featured him in the magazine's famed monthly "Unsigned Hype" column.

In the same year, The Source released an article written by Kimberly Osorio, which identified and researched the history of an old demo tape that the magazine discovered where Eminem insulted black women. In an article in the New York Times, she stated "These are racist remarks by someone who has the ability to influence million of mines." The demo featured a song called "Foolish Pride", recorded in the late 1980s when Eminem claimed to have been "dumped" by his African-American then-girlfriend. Eminem responded with two tracks titled "Nail in the Coffin" and "The Sauce". Benzino would later release more tracks. As a result of the conflict, Shady/Aftermath ads were pulled from the magazine. XXL, another hip-hop magazine which had featured negative coverage of Shady/Aftermath artists since Eminem mocked them in his song "Marshall Mathers" from his 2000 album The Marshall Mathers LP, stepped in to fill the void, accepting Shady/Aftermath ads.

In January 2024, Eminem reignited the feud with Benzino on a new diss track called "Doomsday Pt. 2".

=== Mariah Carey and Nick Cannon ===
Eminem has written several songs referring to a relationship with R&B singer Mariah Carey, although she denies that they were ever intimate. Eminem has referenced her on many songs, including "When the Music Stops", "Superman", "Jimmy Crack Corn", "Bagpipes from Baghdad" and "The Warning". While "Superman" was released in 2003, Carey released a song entitled "Clown" on her album Charmbracelet, released in 2002, which makes similar references in line with her 2009 hit "Obsessed".

Eminem's "Bagpipes from Baghdad" from his album Relapse disparages Carey and rapper/then-husband Nick Cannon's relationship. Cannon responded to Eminem by saying his career is based on "racist bigotry" and that he would get revenge on Eminem, joking that he may return to rapping. Eminem later stated that the couple misinterpreted the track and it was wishing the two the best. Cannon also stated that there were no hard feelings and that he just had to express his feelings about the song.

In 2009, Carey released "Obsessed", about an obsessed man who claims to have been in a relationship with her. Cannon claimed that the song was not an insult directed at Eminem. However, Eminem responded in late July 2009 by releasing a track titled "The Warning". It contained samples of voice mail recordings which Eminem claimed were left by Carey, when the two were dating. Eminem also hinted that he had other evidence of their relationship in his possession. A little over a year later in September 2010, Cannon responded with the song "I'm a Slick Rick", making fun of Eminem.

=== Moby ===
After the release of Eminem's 2000 album The Marshall Mathers LP, popular electronic music artist Moby began speaking out against the album's lyrics, condemning references to misogyny and homophobia as unacceptable. Eminem responded back with insulting Moby in "Without Me", the lead single off his next album The Eminem Show.

In 2004, Moby praised Eminem for criticizing then-U.S. president George W. Bush in the song "Mosh", a track from Encore. The feud has since ended. In 2022, Eminem said that he later regretted attacking Moby.

=== Machine Gun Kelly ===
Eminem and rapper Machine Gun Kelly have had an ongoing feud for several years. The feud started by Machine Gun Kelly saying in a tweet that Hailie was "hot". He was banned from Shade 45 because of the tweet. Kelly released a diss track titled "Rap Devil" in September 2018, in response to Eminem's track "Not Alike"; both songs were produced by Ronny J. Kelly continued the feud at a concert, calling it "a battle between the past and the fucking future". The song's title refers to Eminem's "Rap God" and Eminem went into the studio days later to record his own response, as did former D12 associate Bizarre. Eminem responded with "Killshot" on September 14 and Bizarre's "Love Tap" was released on September 20. "Killshot" garnered 38.1 million streams on YouTube in its first 24 hours and over 80 million views in its first week, making it the most successful debut for a hip-hop song and the third-biggest debut in the platform's history. The track also debuted at number 3 on the Billboard Hot 100, making it Eminem's 20th top 10 hit on the Billboard Hot 100. Kelly has continued the feud publicly.

=== From Kamikaze ===
Throughout the 2018 album Kamikaze Eminem's lyrics criticize other musicians, primarily "mumble rappers", and several have responded publicly. Ja Rule responded on social media, re-igniting a feud the two had 15 years prior. 6ix9ine, Iggy Azalea, Joe Budden, Die Antwoord, Lupe Fiasco, and Lord Jamar have also responded publicly, with 6ix9ine releasing the skit "Legend" that raps over Eminem's "Lose Yourself".

== Allegations of homophobia ==
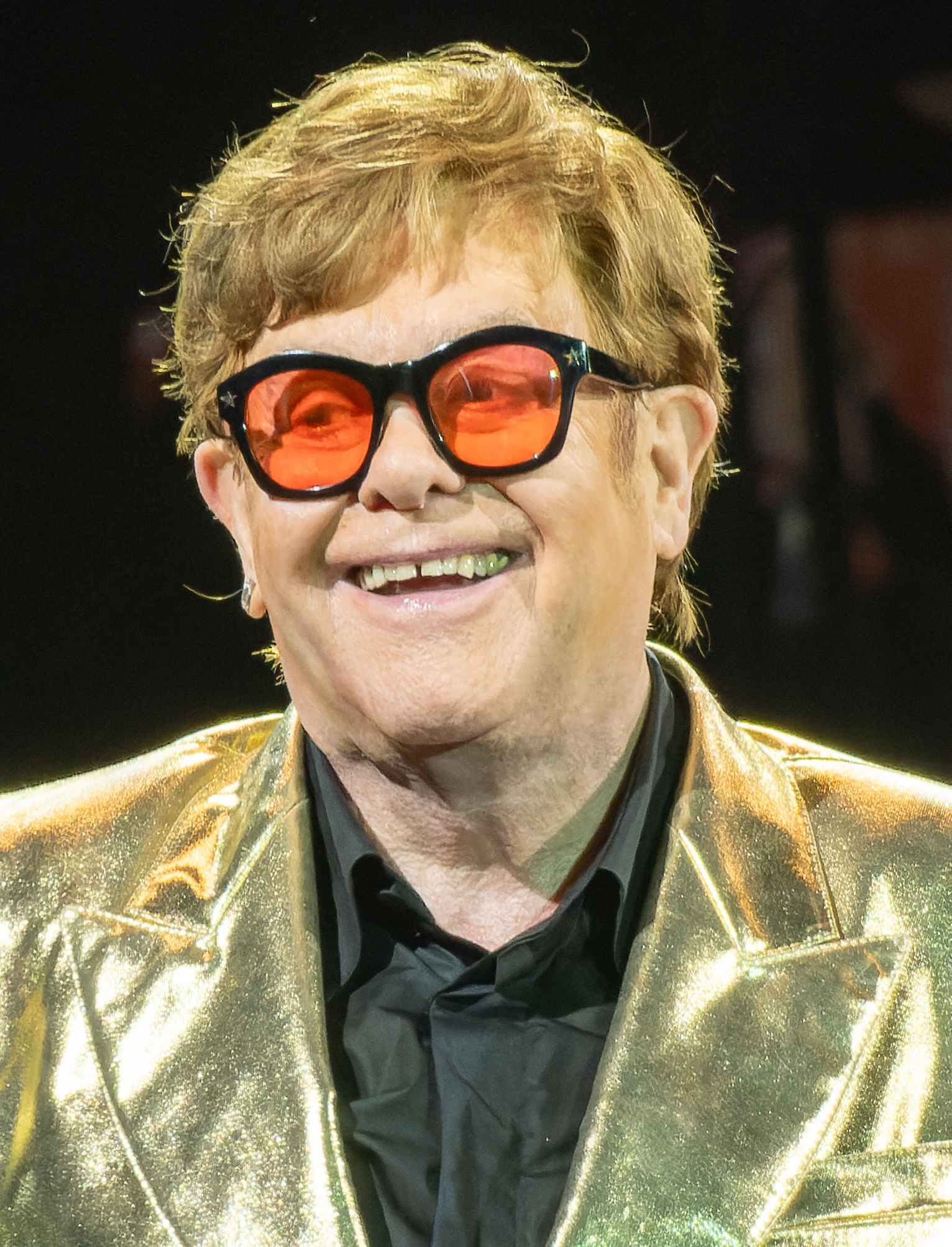
British musician Elton John, who is openly gay, defended Eminem from the homophobic allegations numerous times.

Some of Eminem's lyrics have been criticized for being homophobic, and an Australian politician attempted to ban him from the country. Eminem denies the charge, saying that when he was growing up words such as "faggot" and "queer" were used generally in a derogatory manner and not specifically toward homosexuals. During a 2010 60 Minutes interview, journalist Anderson Cooper explored the issue:

Cooper: Some of the lyrics, like, you know, in the song "Criminal" you say "My words are like a dagger with a jagged edge, That'll stab you in the head, whether you're a fag or lez, Or the homosex, hermaph or a trans-a-vest, Pants or dress—hate fags? The answer's 'yes'".
Eminem: Yeah, this scene I came up in. That word was thrown around so much, you know, "faggot" was like thrown around constantly to each other, like in battling.
Cooper: Do you not like gay people?
Eminem: No, I don't have any problem with nobody. You know what I mean? I'm just like whatever.

In 2013, Eminem was accused of homophobia due to the lyrics of the song "Rap God", explaining to Rolling Stone, "I don't know how to say this without saying it how I've said it a million times. But that word, those kind of words, when I came up battle-rappin' or whatever, I never really equated those words ... (to actually mean homosexual)".

In 2018, Eminem was criticized for using the word "faggot" against Tyler, the Creator in the song "Fall". Eminem later apologized for using the homophobic slur, saying he went "too far". Discussing the issue in a multi-part interview with radio host Sway, Eminem explained that while he meant to stand up for himself, "I think the word that I called him on that song was one of the things where I felt like, 'This might be too far.'" He added, "Because in my quest to hurt him [Tyler], I realize that I was hurting a lot of other people by saying it."

Eminem is a friend of openly gay singer Elton John, and publicly supports gay rights. When asked in 2010 in an interview with The New York Times about the subject of same-sex marriage being legalized in his home state of Michigan, Eminem responded, "I think if two people love each other, then what the hell? I think that everyone should have the chance to be equally miserable, if they want", explaining that his "overall look on things is a lot more mature than it used to be".

== Legal issues ==
Eminem had his first run-in with the law at age 20, when he was arrested for his involvement in a drive-by shooting with a paintball gun. The case was dismissed when the victim did not appear in court.

On June 3, 2000, Eminem was arrested during an altercation with Douglas Dail, an employee of Insane Clown Posse's record label, at a car-audio store in Royal Oak, Michigan, when Eminem pulled out an unloaded gun and pointed it at the ground. The next day, in Warren, Michigan, he was arrested again for assaulting a man in the parking lot of the Hot Rocks Café when he saw the man kissing Eminem's wife. Eminem recreated the Guerra assault in "The Kiss (Skit)" on The Eminem Show. He pleaded guilty to possession of a concealed weapon, receiving two years' probation; a charge of assault using a dangerous weapon was dropped as part of the plea agreement. On June 28, 2001, Eminem was sentenced to one year's probation and community service and was fined about $2,000 on weapon charges stemming from an argument with an employee of Psychopathic Records. In 1999, Eminem's mother sued him for $10 million, claiming he was slandering her on The Slim Shady LP. Litigation concluded in 2001, resulting in an award of $1,600 for her damages.

On July 7, 2000, Kim Mathers attempted suicide by slitting her wrists, later suing Eminem for defamation after describing her violent death in "Kim".

Sanitation worker DeAngelo Bailey sued Eminem for $1 million in 2001, accusing him of invading his privacy by publicizing information placing Bailey in a false light in "Brain Damage", a song that portrays him as a violent school bully. Although Bailey admitted picking on Eminem in school, he said he merely "bumped" Eminem and gave him a "little shove". The lawsuit was dismissed on October 20, 2003; Judge Deborah Servitto, who wrote a portion of her opinion in rap-like rhyming verse, ruled that it was clear to the public that the lyrics were exaggerated.

On March 31, 2002, French jazz pianist Jacques Loussier filed a $10 million lawsuit against Eminem and Dr. Dre, claiming that the beat for "Kill You" was taken from his instrumental "Pulsion". Loussier demanded that sales of The Marshall Mathers LP be halted and any remaining copies destroyed. The case was later settled out of court.

In 2006, Eminem was accused of assaulting a man named Miad Jarbou, a resident of Royal Oak, Michigan, in the bathroom of a Detroit strip club, but was never charged. Two years later, Jarbou sued Eminem for more than $25,000 in damages.

In 2007, Eminem's music-publishing company (Eight Mile Style) and Martin Affiliated sued Apple Inc. and Aftermath Entertainment, claiming that Aftermath was not authorized to negotiate a deal with Apple for digital downloads of 93 Eminem songs on Apple's iTunes. The case against Apple was settled shortly after the trial began, in late September 2009.

In July 2010, the United States Court of Appeals for the Ninth Circuit ruled in F.B.T. Productions, LLC v. Aftermath Records that F.B.T. Productions and Eminem were owed a royalty of 50 percent of Aftermath's net revenue from licensing his recordings to companies such as Apple, Sprint Corporation, Nextel Communications, Cingular and T-Mobile. In March 2011, the Supreme Court of the United States declined to hear the case.

In October 2013, Eminem sampled Chicago-based rap group Hotstylz's 2008 viral hit, "Lookin' Boy", for his 2013 hit single "Rap God". The group claims that Eminem did not receive permission to use the sample, nor did he credit or compensate them. In November 2013, Hotstylz released a diss track towards Eminem titled "Rap Fraud", where they sample several of his songs and criticize him for not crediting them. In January 2015, TMZ reported that Hotstylz was suing Eminem and his label, Shady Records, for $8 million, for using the 25-second sample of "Lookin' Boy" on his song "Rap God" without their permission.

=== United States Secret Service ===
On December 8, 2003, the United States Secret Service reported that it was "looking into" allegations that Eminem threatened U.S. president George W. Bush in "We As Americans" (an unreleased bootleg at the time), with the lyrics: "Fuck money, I don't rap for dead presidents. I'd rather see the president dead, it's never been said but I set precedents." The incident was included in the video for "Mosh", as a newspaper clipping on a wall with articles about unfortunate incidents in Bush's career. "We As Americans" eventually appeared on Encore's deluxe-edition bonus disc with altered lyrics. The original lyrics can be heard at the end of Immortal Technique's "Bin Laden".

In 2018–2019, the Secret Service interviewed Eminem again regarding threatening lyrics towards president Donald Trump and his daughter Ivanka.

== See also ==
- Honorific nicknames in popular music
