= Yes (Fat Joe, Cardi B and Anuel AA song) =

Single by Fat Joe, Cardi B and Anuel AA

from the album Family Ties
- Released: September 6, 2019
- Length: 3:26
- Label: RNG; Empire
- Producer: Cool & Dre

Fat Joe singles chronology
"Pullin" (2019)	"Yes" (2019)	"Deep" (2019)

Cardi B singles chronology
"South of the Border" (2019)	"Yes" (2019)	"Writing on the Wall" (2019)

Anuel AA singles chronology
"Adicto" (2019)	"Yes" (2019)	"Te Quemaste" (2019)

"Yes" (stylized in all caps) is a song by American rappers Fat Joe and Cardi B and Puerto Rican rapper Anuel AA. The song was released on September 6, 2019, as the second single from Fat Joe and Dre's collaborative album, Family Ties (2019).

== Background and composition ==
About the creation of "Yes", Fat Joe said that "this one is special, you know what I'm sayin? Puff Daddy told me and Cool way back in the day that every hit record has a story, and geeze ... let's just put it this way: This one was months in the making, but it was worth the wait ... I think y'all really gonna fuck with it".

"Yes" is a bilingual hip hop song, with Anuel AA's verse being entirely in Spanish. Cardi B rebrands herself as “La Caldi” on the song.

"Yes" uses a sample of the 1972 hit song "Aguanilé", by salsa musicians Héctor Lavoe and Willie Colón, throughout the song.

== Charts ==
Chart (2019)	Peak position
US Bubbling Under Hot 100 (Billboard)	15
US Rhythmic Airplay (Billboard)	23

== Certifications ==
Region	Certification	Certified units/sales
United States (RIAA)	Gold	500,000^{‡}
^{‡} Sales+streaming figures based on certification alone.

== Release history ==
Region	Date	Format	Label
Various	September 6, 2019	Digital download; streaming	RNG; Empire
