= Straight from the Lab =

Compilation album (bootleg) by Eminem
- Released: December 2003
- Recorded: May 2002 – April 2003
- Genre: Hip hop
- Length: 33:44
- Label: Bootleg

Straight from the Lab is a 2003 bootleg album consisting of previously unreleased songs by Eminem. Some of the songs on the album were scheduled to be released the following year on Eminem's fifth studio album, Encore. Two additional series of unreleased songs were leaked in 2011 and 2025 as Straight from the Lab Part 2 and Straight from the Lab Part 3, respectively.

== Background ==
If those hadn't leaked, Encore would've been a much different album. "We as Americans", "Love You More", a lot of songs ended up on the bonus disc because they leaked and that disappointed me. So, I had to start over, which felt like a mountain I had to climb. You climb half the mountain, and then all of a sudden, you get knocked back down. "We as Americans" was going to start the album, then "Bully". "Evil Deeds" was in there. If that would've been on Encore, and the other couple songs that leaked, to me it would've been right there with The Eminem Show as far as its caliber.

— Eminem

According to Complex, the songs on Straight from the Lab were allegedly leaked by a friend of Eminem's brother Nate Mathers, who had found a CD containing a selection of unfinished music at Eminem's house.

== Reception ==
Professional ratings
Review scores
Source	Rating
AllMusic	4/5 stars
Sputnikmusic	3.5/5 stars

In 2013, Jeff Rosenthal of Vulture ranked the third verse of "Bully" as Eminem's sixteenth best of all time, praising its demonstration of what he considered Eminem's two greatest strengths: "his ability to cut through bullshit and noise with a chainsaw" and "acknowledging his own hypocrisy". Rolling Stone would also rank the song at number 50 on their 2024 list of "The 50 Greatest Eminem Songs".

== Part 1 ==
No.	Title	Producer(s)	Length
1.	"Monkey See, Monkey Do"	The Alchemist	3:40
2.	"We Are Americans"	Eminem, Luis Resto	4:59
3.	"I Love You More"	Eminem, Luis Resto	4:56
4.	"Can-I-Bitch"	Mike Elizondo	5:06
5.	"Bully"	Eminem	5:17
6.	"Come On In" (featuring D12)	Eminem, Luis Resto	4:34
7.	"Hailie's Revenge (Doe Rae Me)" (featuring D12 and Obie Trice)	Mr. Porter	5:14

=== Notes ===
- "We Are Americans" was later included on a bonus disc for Eminem's fifth studio album, Encore, with the title "We As Americans". In 2022, Eminem stated that if the song had not leaked, it would have been the opening track on the album, followed by "Bully" as track two. The version in the bootleg is the original uncensored version, with the bonus disc version having a line about the president reversed, while this one does not.
- "I Love You More" was also included on the Encore bonus disc, with the title "Love You More".
- "Can-I-Bitch" samples Slick Rick's song "Children's Story" in the first verse. It is also a word play on the title of Canibus's first album, entitled Can-I-Bus being a diss track to Canibus and is an answer song to the Pet Shop Boys' 2002 song "The Night I Fell in Love". The song was reportedly recorded shortly following the release of Eminem's previous album The Eminem Show.
- "Bully" is a diss track aimed at rappers Benzino, Irv Gotti and Ja Rule. After an incomplete version of the song leaked online in the week before its inclusion on Straight from the Lab, Eminem's management team told MTV News that it had been recorded around six months previously.
- "Come on In" was later included on D12's sophomore album, D12 World, with the title "6 in the Morning".
- "Hailie's Revenge" (sometimes referred to as "Doe Rae Me"), which also first appeared on unofficial mixtapes earlier in 2003, is another diss track which features vocals from Eminem's daughter Hailie Jade in the intro and the outro. It is a response to Ja Rule's song "Loose Change", in which Ja Rule has insulted Eminem's family, including Hailie.

== Part 2 ==
In 2011, a series of leaks occurred by a Twitter user named "NotAfraid2Leak", commonly referred to as "Koolo". These leaks occurred over the span of a few months, and eventually lead to a fully unreleased and unofficial project titled Straight From The Vault EP. Since then, fans have retroactively compiled all of those songs into a follow up mixtape to Straight From The Lab, titled Straight from the Lab Part 2.

No.	Title	Producer	Length
1.	"The Apple"	Eminem, Dr. Dre	4:21
2.	"Things Get Worse" (featuring B.o.B)	Sermstyle	3:51
3.	"Goin' Crazy" (featuring D12)	Mike & Keys	4:03
4.	"Where I'm At"	Boi-1da	2:50
5.	"Detroit Basketball"		2:41
6.	"Here We Go Again"	Dr. Dre	3:55
7.	"Echo" (featuring Royce da 5'9" and Liz Rodrigues)	DJ Khalil	4:30
8.	"Wee Wee"		2:48
9.	"Topless" (featuring Nas and Slim the Mobster)	DJ Khalil	2:37
10.	"Fly Away" (featuring Just Blaze)	Just Blaze	5:08
11.	"Difficult" (featuring Obie Trice)	Eminem	4:42
12.	"Emulate" (featuring Obie Trice)	Eminem	3:12
13.	"Hello, Good Morning (Freestyle)"	Danja	1:03
14.	"Living Proof" (featuring Royce da 5'9")	Mr. Porter	3:46
15.	"Cocaine" (featuring Jazmine Sullivan)	Salaam Remi	4:15
16.	"Get Money (Freestyle)"	Apex	1:39
17.	"Hit Me with Your Best Shot" (featuring D12)	Honorable C.N.O.T.E.	5:23
18.	"Ballin' Uncontrollably"		5:31
19.	"Celebrity (Remix)" (featuring Lloyd Banks and Akon)	Dirk Pate	4:14
20.	"Syllables" (featuring Jay-Z, Dr. Dre, 50 Cent, Stat Quo and Cashis)		5:10
21.	"G.O.A.T"		3:54
22.	"It's Been Real (Outro)"		2:17

=== Notes ===
- "Living Proof" and "Echo" were later released on the deluxe version of Bad Meets Evil's debut EP Hell: The Sequel.
- "Things Get Worse" was later released on B.o.B's Greatest Hits album. In 2019, the track leaked again with a never-before-heard verse that contained reference to the Chris Brown's assault of Rihanna saying that he would side with Chris Brown in this situation, which caused a lot controversy around the track. Eminem would eventually go on to apologize to Rihanna for the lyrics on "Zeus", a track off his 2020 album Music to Be Murdered By: Side B.
- "Goin' Crazy" (later mastered and retitled "Fame") was later released on D12's 2011 mixtape, Return of the Dozen Vol. 2.
- Some tracks on this bootleg were mistitled by the leaker, "Oh No" was later confirmed to be titled "Here We Go Again" and "I Get Money" was later confirmed to be titled "Get Money (Freestyle)".
- "Where I'm At" was later released as an iTunes bonus track for Lloyd Banks' album H.F.M. 2 (The Hunger for More 2).
- "Difficult" is a tribute to Eminem's best friend, Proof, who was murdered in 2006.

== Part 3 ==
On January 12th, 2025, a collection of unreleased Eminem songs surfaced online. The first 14 unreleased songs were compiled by fans into a bootleg album referred to as Straight From The Lab, Part 3. In the days that followed, additional songs leaked, prompting fans to expand the tracklist, circulate updated versions, and attempt to identify and suppress AI-generated imitations. The leaked material was generally organized chronologically by leak date.

On or about January 16, 2025, employees at Eminem’s recording studio in Ferndale, Michigan reported the incident to the FBI. Investigators later determined that the recordings had been copied from password-protected hard drives stored in a studio safe between October 2019 and January 2020. Studio staff obtained a directory listing of the stolen material, which was subsequently being sold online without authorization. In March 2025, federal prosecutors charged Joseph Strange, a former sound engineer who had been employed at the studio during the time of the theft, with copyright infringement and interstate transportation of stolen goods. According to an FBI affidavit, Strange sold the recordings to private collectors in exchange for cryptocurrency. He had previously signed a severance agreement in 2021 prohibiting the electronic distribution of Eminem’s work.

No.	Title	Producer	Length
1.	"Marshall Powers"	Dr. Dre	2:11
2.	"Love Drunk"	Dr. Dre	3:41
3.	"I’m Twisted" (Freestyle)	Illa da Producer	1:31
4.	"Sociopath" (featuring 50 Cent)	Dr. Dre	3:34
5.	"I'm Sorry (Seasons)"		4:43
6.	"Follow Me" (featuring Nate Dogg)	Scott Storch	4:25
7.	"Key To My Room"		4:03
8.	"Trade Off" (Slaughterhouse featuring Eminem)	Just Blaze	4:55
9.	"Jump Out"	Mr. Porter	4:00
10.	"Ritz"	Eminem • Luis Resto	4:29
11.	"Freak" (featuring Westside Boogie and Anderson .Paak)	Mr. Porter	3:37
12.	"Take It (Freestyle)"		1:38
13.	"Antichrist (skit)"		0:37
14.	"Antichrist" (2005 version)	Eminem • Luis Resto	3:54
15.	"Sexual Healing"	Dr. Dre • Trevor Lawerence Jr. • Mark Batson • Eminem	3:26
16.	"Sexual Healing" (featuring Dr. Dre)	Dr. Dre • Trevor Lawerence Jr. • Mark Batson • Eminem	3:32
17.	"Back and Forth" (aka "Discombobulated '09")		3:59
18.	"Paul (skit)"		0:33
19.	"Christopher Reeves"	Eminem • Resto	3:17
20.	"My Darling" (2007 version)		6:12
21.	"Careful What You Wish For" (2006 version)		6:06
22.	"This Is" (Demo version)		4:32
23.	"Stepping Stone" (Demo version)	Resto • Eminem	5:35
24.	"Little Engine" (Alternate version)		5:04
25.	"No Regrets" (Alternate version)		3:01
26.	"Smack You"		5:25

=== Notes ===
- "Antichrist" was originally recorded for the 2005 compilation, Curtain Call, and was later altered and released on the 2024 album, The Death of Slim Shady. The first verse was partially re-recorded and released as the track "Renaissance", while the production and the hook were retained for another track of the same name.
- "I'm Sorry (Seasons)" was supposed to be the lead single for his 2010 album Recovery, but the idea was scrapped due to sample clearance issues and was replaced by "Not Afraid".
- "Christopher Reeves" was recorded for the 2004 album, Encore, but was scrapped because Christopher Reeve died right before the release, as stated in Eminem's track, "Guilty Conscience 2". It was later released under the title "Brand New Dance", with modern additions, on The Death of Slim Shady.
- "Sexual Healing" is the original version of "Is This Love ('09)", which was released on the 2022 compilation Curtain Call 2. The solo version is partly a reference track, recorded for Dr. Dre.
- 50 Cent's feature verse on "Sociopath" was rerecorded and also used for "Is This Love ('09)", as well as a few lines from the pre-chorus and 3rd verse.
- "Back and Forth", recorded for the 2009 album, Relapse, was altered and released under the title "Discombobulated" on the 2020 album, Music to Be Murdered By. It may have been removed due to a line in the second verse about him performing oral sex on a blow-up doll of Miley Cyrus, as Miley was only 16 at the time the song was recorded.
- "My Darling" and "Careful What You Wish For" are earlier versions of songs that were later released on Relapse: Refill.
- "This Is" is a demo of the song "Survival", released on Eminem's 2013 album, The Marshall Mathers LP 2.
- "Jump Out" is a reference track, written and recorded by Eminem in August 2006 for Dr. Dre's scrapped album Detox.
- "Freak" was recorded circa 2017 and is an outtake from the soundtrack album of the comedy-drama film, Bodied.
- "Smack You" was more than likely intended to be on DJ Green Lantern's 2004 mixtape Invasion Part Three: Countdown to Armageddon, but it was not released to respect Dr. Dre's wish of de-escalation as mentioned in the song "Like Toy Soldiers", as the song contains disses towards Suge Knight and Ja Rule at a time when tensions between Shady/Aftermath and Murder Inc. were at an all-time high.
- "Antichrist (skit)" has been reused in the songs "Rhyme or Reason" and "Evil Twin" both in his 2013 album The Marshall Mathers LP 2.
- "Trade Off" was planned to be featured on Slaughterhouse's scrapped album, Glasshouse.
- "Marshall Powers" was planned to be the intro to Eminem's studio album, Kamikaze, but was scrapped because it "went too far".
- "Love Drunk", "Sociopath", "Key To My Room", "Sexual Healing", and "Back and Forth" were all intended for Eminem's scrapped sequel to his 6th studio album, Relapse, titled Relapse 2 but was ultimately scrapped due to Interscope Records turning the album copy down.
- An alternate version of the Encore track "My 1st Single" was listed on track listings of early versions of Straight From The Lab 3. However, it was unofficially removed from the track list due to not actually being an unreleased version, instead being a fusion of the clean version and the explicit version.
- A studio recording version of the song "Renaissance" from the album "The Death of Slim Shady (Coup de Grâce)" was listed on track listings of early versions of Straight From The Lab 3. This version of the track claimed to be an early version without the AI voice overlay. However, due to the fact that the files for all of the songs within the bootleg were retrieved from between October 2019 and January 2020, and "Renaissance" was recorded at some point between 2021 and 2024, it was ruled that the supposedly leaked version was fake and likely made by using AI voiceover technology, leading it to be removed from the unofficial track list.
