= The World Changed On Me =

Studio album by Fat Joe
- Released: December 13, 2024
- Genre: Hip-hop
- Length: 30:58
- Labels: RNG; EMPIRE
- Producers: Cool & Dre; DJ Khaled; Don Cannon; Smash David; 808-Ray; Akxen; Andrei Andrei; CRATER; Foreign Tek; FortyOneSix; G06 Beatz; Hero STW; HeroSavesTheWerld; KD-Beatz; Khamail Dunigan; Lovi; Michael Mahko; Mighty Max; Park Geon; Splited Stupid; STREETRUNNER; Tarik Azzouz; Westtopher

Fat Joe chronology
Family Ties (2019)	The World Changed On Me (2024)	Organized Rhyme (2026)

Singles from The World Changed On Me
- 1. "Paradise" Released: September 12, 2024; 2. "I Got You" Released: November 26, 2024

The World Changed On Me is the eleventh studio album by American rapper Fat Joe. It was released on December 13, 2024, by RNG and Empire Distribution. It features guest appearances by Anitta, Babyface, Cool & Dre, Chris Rock, DJ Khaled, Remy Ma, Tony Sunshine, Ty Dolla Sign, Karma Nova and Tuggawar. Production was handled by various record producers, including Cool & Dre, DJ Khaled, Don Cannon and Smash David. It is his first solo studio album since The Darkside Vol. 1, released in 2010.

== Background ==
On September 12, 2024, Fat Joe released the lead single of the album, "Paradise", which features Brazilian singer Anitta and longtime collaborator DJ Khaled.

On November 26, 2024, he released the second single of the album, "I Got You", which features American singer Babyface.

The album cover is an old photograph of Fat Joe and his older brother, Angel Cartagena, who died on Thanksgiving 2024.

The album's title paints a vivid picture of his journey from hustling on the streets to achieving wealth and status. The song reminisces about the gritty reality of his past while contrasting it with his present life of luxury and the disloyalty he has encountered along the way.

== Track listing ==
The World Changed On Me Track listing
No.	Title	Writer(s)	Producer(s)	Length
1.	"Talking Hot" (with Karma Nova & Dre)	Joseph Antonio Cartagena; Marcello Antonio Valenzano; Andre Christopher Lyon; Francesco Di Giacomo; Vittorio Novenzi; James Burns; Shereen Inez Dibseh	Cool & Dre	3:27
2.	"Mini Birki" (with Ty Dolla Sign and Cool & Dre)	Cartagena; Tyrone William Griffin Jr.; Valenzano; Lyon; Mikhail Makhinko; Jean Baptiste Lamothe; Khamall Dunigan; Park Mingeon; Nikita Murenets; Lovis Delano Baker II	Cool & Dre; G06 Beatz; Hero SavesTheWerld; KD-Beatz; Khamail Dunigan; Lovi; Michael Mahko; SPLITED STUPID	2:50
3.	"Us" (with Chris Rock and Remy Ma)	Cartagena; Reminisce Kioni Mackie; Rayshon Cobbs Jr.; Valenzano; Lyon; Nathaniel Kim	808-Ray; Cool & Dre; Crater; Shawn Hibbler^{[a]}	3:02
4.	"Dog House"	Cartagena; Michael Hernandez; Maurice Marshall; Adam Duggins; Marlon Hassanali; Katrina Laverne Kearse; Lasana Smith; Samuel David Jimenez	Jon Milli; Foreign Tek; Smash David	3:10
5.	"Me N U" (with Dre)	Cartagena; Cobbs Jr.; Valenzano; Lyons; Sigidi Bashir Abdullah; Harold Clayton	808-Ray; Cool & Dre; Shawn Hibbler ^{[a]}	3:01
6.	"Bad Man" (with Tuggawar)	Cartagena; Donald Cannon; Neofytos Neofytou; Valenzano; Donat Roy Mittoo; Leroy Sibbles; Lee Oskar; Robert Bernard Lyn; Felix Headley Bennett; Huford Brown; Leroy Jordan; Harold Ray Brown; Howard Scott; Charles Miller; Thomas Allen; Morris Dickerson; Fitzroy Simpson	Don Cannon	2:56
7.	"I Got You" (with Babyface)	Cartagena; Kenneth Brian Edmonds; Arasb Ghassemi; Jason Hernandez; Andrei Manta	Akxen; Andrei; FortyOneSix	2:14
8.	"Fresh" (with Tony Sunshine)	Cartagena; Antonio Cruz; Valenzano; Lyon; Donald Addrisi; Richard Addrisi; Jahmal Gwin	Cool & Dre; Boogz the Beast^{[a]}	2:59
9.	"Paradise" (with Anitta and DJ Khaled)	Cartagena; Larissa de Macedo Machado; Khaled Mohammed Khaled; Theron Thomas; Britanny Coney; Denisia Andrews; Jordan Kyle Lanier Thorpe; Stevie Hill	DJ Khaled	2:27
10.	"The World Changed On Me"	Cartagena; Nicholas Warwar; Tarik Azzouz; Maxime Breton	STREETRUNNER; Tarik Azzouz; Maxime Breton	2:21
11.	"They Don't Love You"	Cartagena; Charles Tyler Adams; Valenzano; Lyon; Jhené Aiko Efuru Chilombo; Ernest Dion Wilson; Steve Wyreman	Shawn Hibbler; Westtopher; Cool & Dre	2:31
Total length:				30:58

Notes

- ^{^[a]} signifies a co-producer
