= Smack You =

Unreleased diss track by Eminem

Song by Eminem
- Released: January 13, 2025 (leaked)
- Recorded: c. 2003

"Smack You" is a diss track by American rapper Eminem aimed at fellow rapper Ja Rule and record executive Suge Knight. Recorded c. 2003, it has never been officially released; it was leaked online on January 13, 2025, along with numerous other Eminem songs that month, and fans compiled them onto an unofficial album they titled Straight from the Lab 3. The track dates from a time when Eminem was actively feuding with Ja Rule, having become involved in 50 Cent's feud with Ja Rule after 50 Cent signed with Eminem's Shady Records in 2002.

In the song, Eminem mocks Ja Rule for modeling himself after Tupac Shakur and for associating with Knight, joking that Knight was only interested in his publishing. He further alleges that Knight was responsible for Shakur's death, and for the murder of the Notorious B.I.G, prompting Knight's son Suge Jr. to respond on the track "Ocean Krwi" and to make a statement defending his father in March 2025. That same month, following an FBI investigation, a former studio employee of Eminem was charged in connection with the leaks.

== Background and leak ==
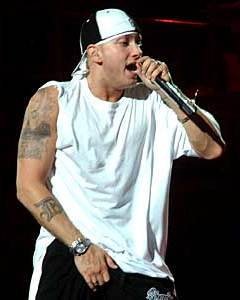
Eminem in 2003, the year he likely recorded "Smack You"

Eminem became involved in 50 Cent's feud with Ja Rule after signing 50 Cent to his label, Shady Records, in 2002. Initially, his involvement in the feud was minimal; it intensified after Ja Rule mentioned Eminem's daughter Hailie Jade on the diss track "Loose Change", where he rapped: "Em, you claim your mother's a crackhead and Kim is a known slut / So what's Hailie gon' be when she grows up?" Eminem went on to diss Ja Rule on tracks like "Bully", "Doe Rae Me (Hailie's Revenge)", and "Hail Mary". XXL magazine speculates that "Smack You" was recorded around the same time as "Hail Mary" in 2003. Uproxx likewise places its recording date at "around 2003".

The song also sees Eminem take aim at Suge Knight, the co-founder of Death Row Records. In his 2004 song "Like Toy Soldiers", Eminem raps about Dr. Dre dissuading him from dissing Knight, which may be the reason why "Smack You" was not officially released. The song was leaked more than two decades later, on January 13, 2025, shortly after several other unreleased Eminem songs. Over two dozen songs leaked in January, and fans compiled them into an unofficial album titled Straight from the Lab 3. Eminem's longtime spokesman, Dennis Dennehy, condemned the leaks and described the surfaced material as "studio efforts never meant for public consumption", including "demos, experiments and ideas" that no longer held relevance.

In March 2025, an audio engineer who formerly worked at Effigy—Eminem's recording studio in Ferndale, Michigan—was charged with criminal copyright infringement and interstate transportation of stolen goods following an investigation by the FBI. The engineer allegedly sold unreleased Eminem songs to individuals who, in January 2025, distributed over 25 of them online. The Detroit Free Press reported that "Smack You" was presumably among these songs.

== Composition ==
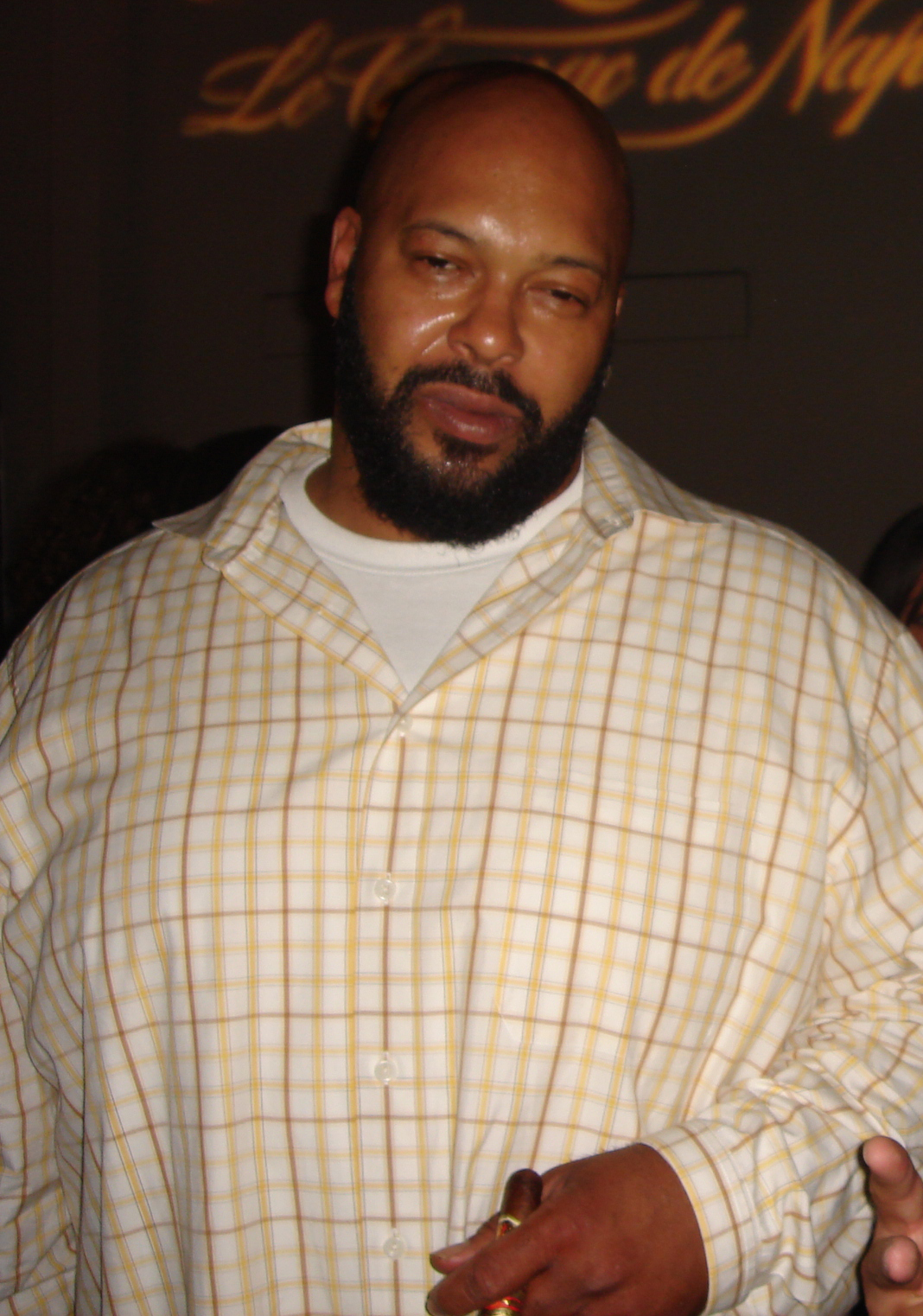
Suge Knight

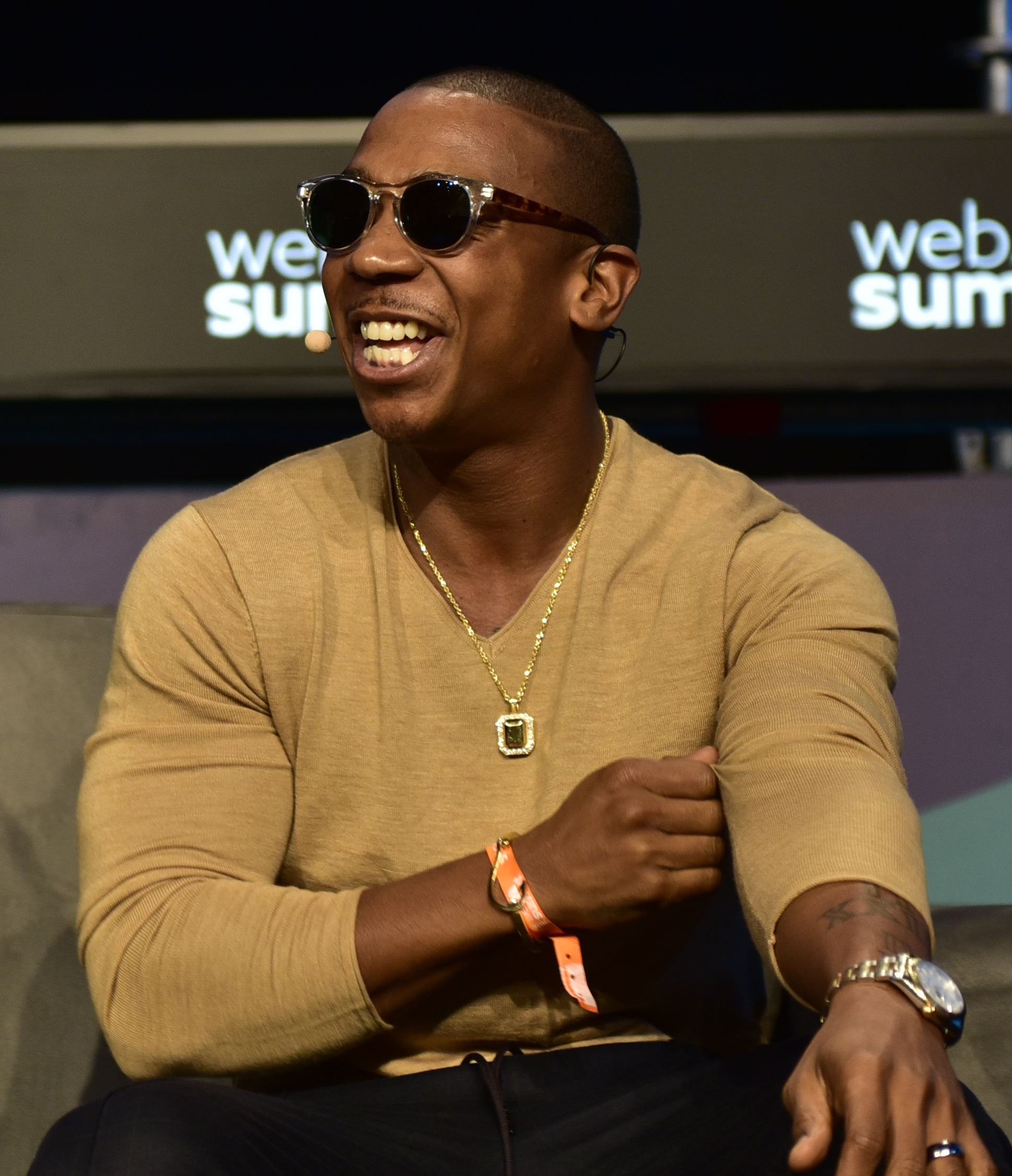
Ja Rule

"Smack You" is approximately five and a half minutes long. The song interpolates the chorus of Tupac Shakur's "Against All Odds". "Smack You" also samples a phrase from Shakur's "Bomb First (My Second Reply)" that has long been interpreted by some fans as uttering the words "Suge shot me." This phrase is repeated throughout the song as Eminem proceeds to blame Knight for the murders of Shakur and the Notorious B.I.G. Shakur, a member of Death Row Records, was in the passenger seat of a car driven by Knight when he was fatally injured in a drive-by shooting, with Knight sustaining a non-fatal injury. Knight's potential involvement in the death of the Notorious B.I.G. was also investigated by the FBI. He has denied any involvement.

Taking aim at Ja Rule, at whom most of the song's lyrics are aimed, Eminem mocks him for modeling himself after Shakur and for trying to associate with Knight, claiming in a joking manner that Knight only wanted his publishing and that Ja Rule would be the next rapper "sittin' on the passenger side of that Benz that gets hit again". Eminem also disses Irv Gotti—the co-founder of Murder Inc. Records, which Ja Rule was signed to—calling him "the Cookie Monster of rap". The song also features vocals by Eminem's daughter Hailie.

== Reception and response ==
Writing for HotNewHipHop, Elias Andrews remarked that it was "bizarre" to first hear an Eminem diss track so long after it was originally recorded, noting that Eminem had recently made an effort to stop feuding and had mentioned his past Ja Rule disses in his 2024 song "Guilty Conscience 2". Andrews spoke favorably of "Smack You", describing it as "an entertaining lyrical bombing from a rapper who, at the time, had a lot of grievances to air out". Vice's Stephen Andrew Galiher was similarly positive, calling the song "one of Em's better diss tracks".

In March 2025, Knight's son Suge Jr. and the Polish rap group Elita Kaliska collaborated on the song "Ocean Krwi". In his part, Suge Jr. calls for his father to be freed from prison and disses "Internet gangsters". Although he does not mention Eminem by name, he said in a statement to NME that it is a response to "Smack You" that he recorded to "defend [his] father's honor". In the same statement, he denied his father's rumored involvement in Shakur's death, noting that his father and Shakur had been best friends, and he criticized Eminem for not having the courage to say these things "to his [father's] face" when he had many opportunities to do so, finding it "strange" that the song was released at a time when his father could not defend himself.

== See also ==
- List of diss tracks
