= The Warning (song) =

Song by Eminem
- Released: July 30, 2009
- Recorded: 2009
- Genre: Hip-hop
- Length: 3:20
- Label: Shady; Aftermath; Interscope
- Songwriter: Marshall Mathers
- Producer: Dr. Dre

"The Warning" is a hip-hop diss song written and performed by the American rapper Eminem and produced by Dr. Dre as part of an ongoing conflict with singer Mariah Carey. Throughout his career, Eminem has claimed he once had a relationship with Carey, dating her for six months. Carey consistently denies the claim. Eminem recorded a number of songs in which he raps about the singer in a negative light, angered by her dismissal.

Eminem's sixth album Relapse (2009) featured a song titled "Bagpipes from Baghdad", containing insulting comments about Carey and her then-husband Nick Cannon. Afterward, Cannon posted on his website expressing disgust. Eminem responded in a 2009 Tim Westwood interview by saying he meant well and that the song is actually "wishing the couple the best." After the release of Carey's single "Obsessed", a song about an obsessed man who claims to be having a relationship with her, Eminem claimed that the song was directed at himself, despite claims to the contrary by Cannon (although he later said that it was a diss to Eminem). As a response, Eminem released "The Warning". Cannon responded to that song with his "I'm a Slick Rick", and challenged Eminem to a boxing match for charity which never took place.

"The Warning" received mixed critical reception upon its release. Though not released as a single or as part of an album, it did peak at number 31 on the US Billboard Rhythmic Top 40, number 23 on the US Billboard Hot Rap Songs chart, and number 8 on the US Billboard Bubbling Under Hot R&B/Hip-Hop Singles chart, the latter being the song's highest position.

== Background and release ==
From the year 2001 onwards, Eminem claimed to have dated Carey for six months through a gloomy period in her life. Carey denied ever having been involved with Eminem in a personal relationship, claiming that they had only met a handful of times, and it was professional. Subsequently, he referred to Carey in several of his songs in a negative light, claiming to have been angered by her not admitting to seeing him. On Charmbracelet, Carey included a song titled "Clown", which critics suggested was aimed at Eminem. "Clown"'s lyrics were described as "languidly sinister" by Sarah Rodman of The Boston Globe, and read: "I should've left it at 'I like your music too'... You should never have intimated we were lovers / When you know very well we never even touched each other." In 2005, during concerts on the rapper's Anger Management Tour, he began playing voice-mails and recordings that were reportedly left by Carey. One of the messages said: "I heard you were getting back with your ex-wife. Why won't you see me? Why won't you call me?" After playing the excerpt, Eminem would pretend to be sick before launching into his song "Puke". On May 12, 2009, Eminem released his sixth album Relapse, which included the song "Bagpipes from Baghdad". The song's lyrics suggested Eminem was still in love with Carey and "wanted her back": "I want another crack at ya" and "Nick Cannon better back the fuck up. I'm not playing, I want her back, you punk." After the song's release, Cannon went on his website, defending Carey and expressing his disgust at the rapper's comments:

I felt sorry for him because he must really be stuck in the past. Not only has his music not evolved, but also homeboy is still obsessed with my wife, the same female that wouldn't let him get to second base from eight years ago. What type of grown ass man lies about getting with a chick? Only Slim Lamey! LOL! I’m putting this out there now. Marshall Mathers, you need to holler at me... Man to man, let’s meet up and deal with this like adults. So, Miss Marshall, I'm going to make you wish you never spoke my name and regret the ungodly things you said about my wife. Your legacy has now been tainted from this day forth! You will now be known as the rapper who lost to corny-ass Nick Cannon!

Eminem responded to Cannon's comments sarcastically, saying that the song was really "wishing the couple the best", and that it was a misunderstanding. In an interview with BBC Radio, Eminem clarified that although contained a "harsh" line, he meant well: "There's a line on there that was a little harsh. It's a harsh line. But it's like this, the way I look at it, I had no idea he was gonna take it like he took it. I had no idea Nick Cannon was gonna start wildin' out on me. No pun intended." He later commented that he respected Cannon for his comment, and that he expected him to stand up for his wife: "I didn't read his blog or anything. But it is what it is. He's supposed to defend his wife, and I expected him to do that. But at the end of the day, it's a line I said – it's a song. What I actually meant to say is, I wish them the best. That's what I meant to say. That's the whole message of the record."

After Carey premiered "Obsessed" on June 16, 2009, the media frenzied and began speculating the song was targeting Eminem, due to its lyrics and overall message. Following the song's accompanying music video, which featured Carey playing a role that resembled the rapper, critics considered it Carey's response to Eminem's "Bagpipes from Baghdad". Soon after both the release of the song and its video, Eminem released "The Warning" on July 30, 2009, which he claimed to be a retaliation. In the aftermath of the releases, Cannon was questioned regarding the inspiration of "Obsessed", and whether it was ever directed at Eminem:

She's Mariah Carey. She's not beefin', she's a vegetarian. People keep saying ['Obsessed'] was directed at certain people. To be completely honest, she did the record 'cause she's a huge fan of this movie Mean Girls, and there's a line in the movie where one of the girls is like, 'Why are you so obsessed with me?' She says that at the beginning of the song, and that's where the concept came from. But, you know, art imitates life.

== Content and composition ==
Produced by Dr. Dre, "The Warning" is a mid-tempo track that is almost entirely made up of soft piano keys playing in the background, a consistent drum beat, and occasional strings every few seconds. The song contains no chorus.

The song's lyrics allude to his supposed relationship with Mariah Carey, the music video for "Obsessed", and pictures and proof he claims to have of the couple. The song begins "Only reason I dissed you in the first place is because you denied seeing me. Now I'm pissed off," before describing Carey's impersonation of him in her video, "Oh gee, is that supposed to be me in the video with the goatee?/ Wow Mariah, didn't expect you to go balls out." Eminem continues describing a near-sexual encounter with the singer, threatening to release voice-mails and pictures he still has in his possession.

== Response ==
Although Carey did not publicly respond to "The Warning", in September 2010 Cannon responded with a song titled "I'm a Slick Rick", on which he attacks Eminem for his disparaging lyrics towards Carey, using a flow similar to that of rapper Slick Rick. He also later proposed a boxing match between himself and Eminem for charity, even setting up a Facebook page to promote the idea; however, the event never took place. Eminem responded to the proposal and further dissed Carey and Cannon on the song "Lord Above".

Daniel Kreps of Rolling Stone noted that Eminem "is more sharp and on-point here than on some of Relapse." Simon Vozick-Levinson of Entertainment Weekly however, stated that there is only one "clever" line aimed at Cannon, and that "everything else is just so predictable coming from Em[inem] at this point."

== Chart performance ==
| Chart (2009) | Peak position |
|---|---|
| US Bubbling Under R&B/Hip-Hop Singles (Billboard) | 8 |
| US Rap Songs (Billboard) | 23 |
| US Rhythmic Top 40 (Billboard) | 31 |

== See also ==
- List of diss tracks
