= Zeus (song) =

Song by Eminem featuring White Gold

from the album Music to Be Murdered By – Side B
- Released: December 18, 2020
- Length: 3:50
- Label: Shady; Aftermath; Interscope
- Songwriters: Marshall Mathers; B. Yewah; Tyler Williams; Luca Mauti
- Producer: T-Minus

"Zeus" is a song by American rapper Eminem featuring White Gold, released on December 18, 2020, as part of Music to Be Murdered By – Side B, the deluxe version of Eminem's 11th studio album. Produced by T-Minus, it features Eminem rapping about a variety of topics: He apologizes to Rihanna over a leaked song in which he rapped about siding with Chris Brown over his assault of her; he disses Snoop Dogg over an interview in which Snoop Dogg said he could "live without" Eminem's music; and, among other topics, he provides commentary on fame and critics, warning Drake that people will "turn on him" as he becomes more successful.

"Zeus" charted in multiple countries, including the United States, where it peaked at No. 3 on the Bubbling Under Hot 100 chart and at No. 35 on the Hot R&B/Hip-Hop Songs chart. Due to its lyrical content, it was among the most-discussed songs from Side B. Snoop Dogg initially responded to Eminem's diss with hostility on social media, although the two soon resolved their feud when Dr. Dre, a mentor of both, had a brain aneurysm in January 2021. Eminem's warning to Drake resurfaced as the subject of online discourse in 2023, when Drake released his album For All the Dogs, and again in 2024, amid the Drake–Kendrick Lamar feud.

== Background and composition ==
"Zeus" is a track from Music to Be Murdered By – Side B, which was surprise-released on December 18, 2020, through Shady Records, Aftermath Entertainment, and Interscope Records. The week before the release, there were rumors of an upcoming Eminem album, including an alleged tracklist; although the tracklist turned out to be fake, one of its songs, "Demons & Zeus", may be related to the released "Zeus".

The song features a hook by White Gold and was produced by T-Minus, with additional production by Eminem and Luca Mauti; the latter played guitar on the record, and Eminem's longtime collaborator Luis Resto played keyboards. All but Resto are credited as songwriters. Eminem and White Gold had previously worked together on "You Gon' Learn" from the original Music to Be Murdered By.

=== Rihanna apology ===
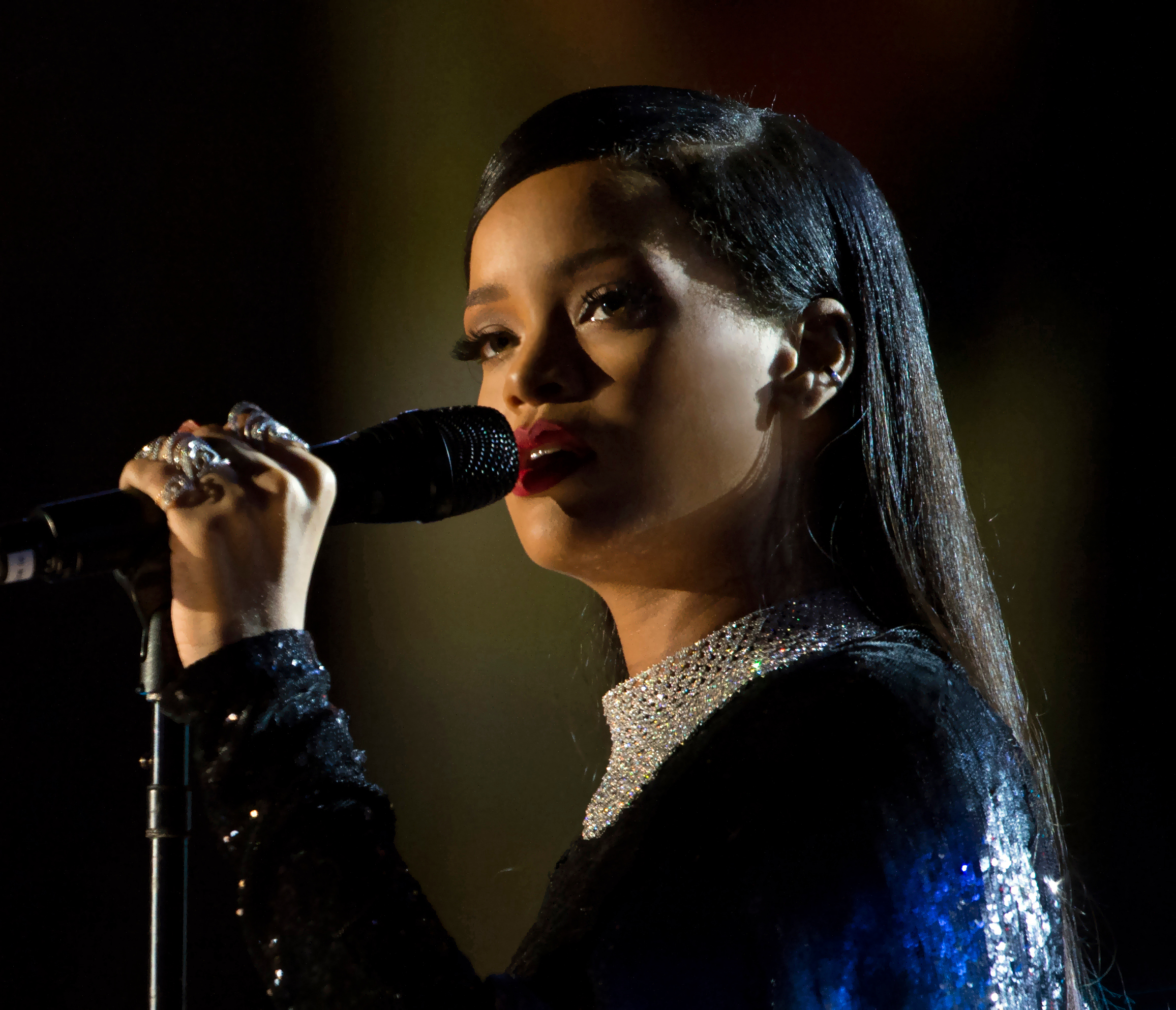
Rihanna

In "Zeus", Eminem apologizes to Rihanna for "Things Get Worse", a song of his, recorded for Relapse in 2009, that was leaked online in 2019 and features lyrics about siding with Chris Brown over his assault of Rihanna. Eminem and Rihanna had collaborated multiple times in the past, including on Eminem's singles "Love the Way You Lie" (2010) and "The Monster" (2013). Shortly after releasing "Zeus", Eminem spoke about the situation on his radio station, Shade 45. He claimed to have "zero recollection" of recording the offensive lyrics, explaining that the leaked song was made during a phase when he followed an approach of "if it rhymes, say it". Nonetheless, he said that this was not an excuse and that he was wrong for what he said.

=== Snoop Dogg diss ===
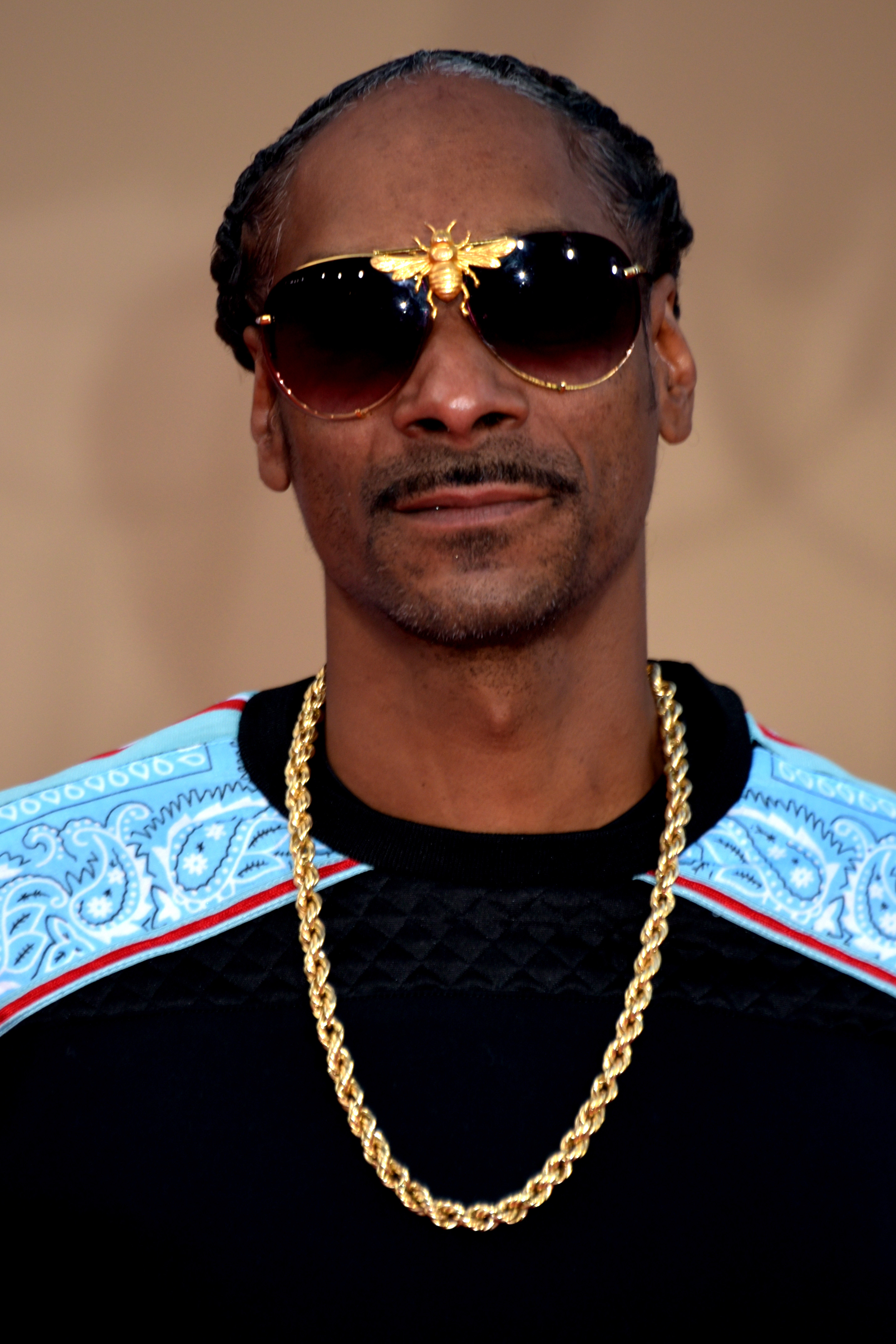
Snoop Dogg

"Zeus" further sees Eminem address Snoop Dogg. He raps about not being used to people from his camp "knocking" him, adding, "last thing I need is Snoop doggin' me / Man, Dogg, you was like a damn god to me / Man not really, I had dog backwards".

Eminem and Snoop Dogg are longtime associates, having both gained prominence under the mentorship of the producer Dr. Dre. The two have collaborated musically and toured together. In July 2020, Snoop Dogg appeared on the radio show The Breakfast Club, where he said that while many considered Eminem a top 10 rapper of all time, he did not agree, suggesting that Eminem's respect in hip-hop as a White rapper was because of Dr. Dre and adding that he could "live without" his music. He named several rappers from the 1980s that, in his opinion, exceeded Eminem in skill. Although he maintained that he held Eminem in high regard, many fans perceived his comments as a diss.

Discussing why he dissed Snoop Dogg on "Zeus", Eminem said he had no issue with him sharing his opinion, even agreeing with the sentiments regarding Dr. Dre and the older-generation rappers. He explained, however, that he was offended by his tone, but that he could have looked past it had it not been for the comment that he could live without his music, which took him by surprise, and which he found disrespectful.

=== Other lyrics ===
Aside from Snoop Dogg, Eminem disses Tekashi 6ix9ine ("She says I am trash, but she listens to Tekashi") and also references his feud with Machine Gun Kelly ("She thinks Machine washed me").

Rapping directly to Drake, Eminem warns him that as he becomes more successful, people will "turn on [him]" and criticize his output regardless of its quality. He mentions his own experiences with critics and adds that this has already happened to Chance the Rapper, and that it will happen to Future and the Migos, too.

Elsewhere, Eminem references his 11-year sobriety coin. He raps about how he grew up in poverty and says that Black people saved his life, including his late friend Proof and Dr. Dre. He follows this by calling for racial equality before listing victims of police brutality to whom he offers his condolences, such as Eric Garner and Breonna Taylor. He further raps, "No, we can't get along 'til these White motherfuckin' cops who keep murderin' Blacks are off the streets."

== Reception ==
Due to Eminem addressing recent controversies he was involved in and mentioning some particularly high-profile celebrities, "Zeus" was one of the most-discussed songs from Music to Be Murdered By – Side B. Luke Fox of Exclaim! called it the best of the album's "more sober pieces", citing White Gold's "understated" hook and Eminem's introspection, his commentary on police brutality, and his "sharp insight" on the temporary nature of fame. Chase McMullen of Beats per Minute similarly wrote that it was "quite bracing to hear a rapper of [Eminem's] stature openly address artists currently falling out of vogue", calling the song a highlight of the album.

Variety's Andrew Barker wrote that Eminem "always walked a fine line between unguarded honesty and thin-skinned victimhood", finding that "Zeus" was just barely on the "right side of that ledger". He thought his Rihanna apology, lyrics about Snoop Dogg, and warnings to other rappers about fame sounded serious, but questioned his suggestion that people wanted him to "rap responsibly". Barker found it unlikely that anyone still expected Eminem to change his usual approach, observing, based on the content of Side B, that Eminem himself seemed uninterested in doing so.

Aaron Williams of Uproxx described "Zeus" as the "apotheosis" of Side B and as the song that highlighted both the negative and positive qualities of the album. He complimented its chorus and production, and he praised its lyrical themes as pointing to something other than Eminem's frequent themes of misogyny and dismissal of criticism, which, according to Williams, nonetheless appear at the beginning of the song. Williams was hopeful that this display of growth was a sign of Eminem possibly "realizing that his platform means something". "That tiny glimmer of hope? Consider it provisionally, begrudgingly restored", he wrote at the end of his review.

== Aftermath ==
=== Snoop Dogg ===
Snoop Dogg reacted to Eminem's diss on January 1, 2021, when he commented "Pray I don't answer that soft ass shit" on an Instagram post by an Eminem fan account. The two resolved their feud later that month, after Dr. Dre had a brain aneurysm. They went on to perform together in Dr. Dre's Super Bowl LVI halftime show in February 2022, and in June of that year, they collaborated on the song "From the D 2 the LBC".

In a 2022 interview on his manager Paul Rosenberg's podcast, Eminem said he believed his and Snoop Dogg's past issues stemmed from a miscommunication dating back to 2000: Snoop Dogg had featured on Eminem's song "Bitch Please II" and wanted Eminem to return the favor, which did not materialize; Snoop Dogg and his camp perceived this as a diss, but there were no such intentions according to Eminem and his manager.

=== Machine Gun Kelly ===
Responding to Eminem's lyrics about him on "Zeus" (and "Gnat" from the same album), Machine Gun Kelly posted a tweet writing "those subliminals", accompanied by a laughing emoji and trash can emojis.

=== Drake ===
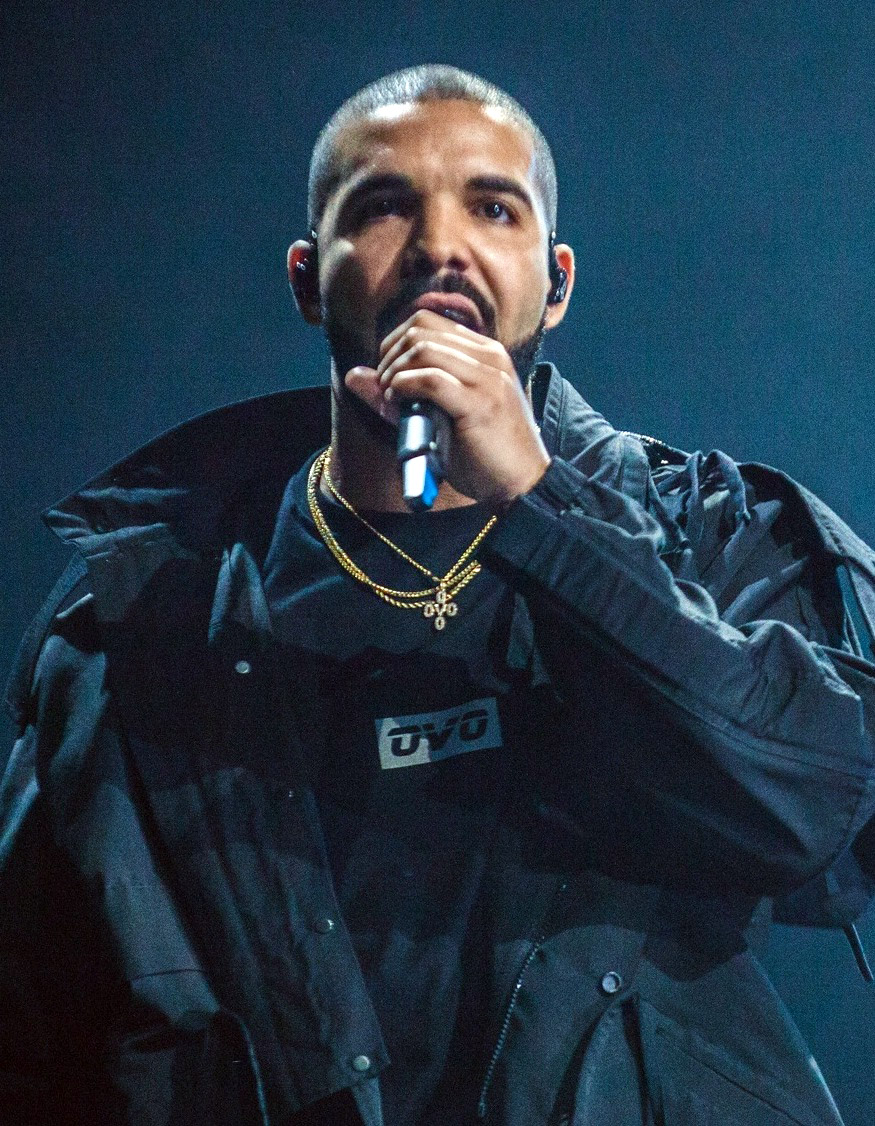
Drake

In October 2023, when Drake released his album For All the Dogs to mixed reception, some fans and commentators online saw Eminem's "Zeus" lyrics as having predicted the backlash Drake was receiving. The lyrics became the subject of online discourse again in March 2024, after Kendrick Lamar dissed Drake on the song "Like That".

== Charts ==
Chart performance for "Zeus"
Chart (2020–2021)	Peak position
Canada Hot 100 (Billboard)	70
New Zealand Hot 40 Singles (RMNZ)	8
UK Hip Hop and R&B Singles (OCC)	31
UK Singles Downloads (OCC)	88
UK Singles Sales (OCC)	95
US Bubbling Under Hot 100 (Billboard)	3
US Hot R&B/Hip-Hop Songs (Billboard)	35
