= Family Ties (Fat Joe and Dre album) =

Studio album by Fat Joe and Dre
- Released: December 6, 2019
- Genre: Hip hop
- Length: 41:33
- Label: RNG; EMPIRE
- Producer: 808-Ray; Cool & Dre; Hitmaka; Boi-1da; SmittyBeatz

Fat Joe chronology
Plata O Plomo (2017)	Family Ties (2019)	The World Changed On Me (2024)

Singles from Family Ties
- 1. "Pullin'" Released: June 27, 2019; 2. "Yes" Released: September 6, 2019; 3. "Deep" Released: December 2, 2019; 4. "Hands on You" Released: January 28, 2020

Professional ratings
Review scores
Source	Rating
Exclaim!	7/10
HipHopDX	3.2/5
RapReviews	7/10

Family Ties is a collaborative studio album by American rapper Fat Joe and record producer Dre of the record production duo Cool & Dre. It was released on December 6, 2019, via RNG (Rap's New Generation) and EMPIRE.

The album features guest appearances from Jeremih, Anuel AA, Big Bank DTE, Bryson Tiller, Cardi B, Eminem, Lil Wayne, Mary J. Blige, Remy Ma and Ty Dolla $ign. The album debuted at number 81 on the US Billboard 200 albums chart.

== Track listing ==
Adapted from Apple Music

No.	Title	Producer(s)	Length
1.	"Projects"	Dre	3:10
2.	"Been Thru"	Dre	2:57
3.	"Heaven & Hell"	Dre	3:34
4.	"Hands on You" (featuring Jeremih & Bryson Tiller)	Boi-1da; Jahaan Sweet	4:05
5.	"Day 1s" (featuring Big Bank DTE)	Dre	4:11
6.	"Yes" (featuring Cardi B & Anuel AA)	Cool & Dre	3:32
7.	"Big Splash" (featuring Remy Ma)	Dre	4:19
8.	"Lord Above" (featuring Eminem & Mary J. Blige)	Cool & Dre; 808-Ray; SmittyBeatz	4:54
9.	"Drive" (featuring Ty Dolla $ign & Jeremih)	Cardiak; Hitmaka	4:11
10.	"Pullin'" (featuring Lil Wayne)	808-Ray; Dre	3:04
11.	"Deep"	Dre	3:36

== Charts ==
Chart (2019)	Peak position
US Billboard 200	81
US Top R&B/Hip-Hop Albums (Billboard)	39
