= Organized Rhyme (album) =

Studio album by Fat Joe
- Released: August 28, 2026
- Genre: Hip-hop
- Length: 36:07
- Labels: RNG; EMPIRE
- Producers: Cool & Dre; Mike Zombie; Sap; Ed Boi; STREETRUNNER; Tarik Azzouz

Fat Joe chronology
The World Changed On Me (2024)	Organized Rhyme (2026)

Singles from Organized Rhyme
- 1. "Victory Lap (HIM)" Released: June 11, 2026; 2. "The Aroma" Released: July 10, 2026

Professional ratings
Review scores
Source	Rating
Ratings Game Music	C+
Shatter the Standards	4/5 stars

Organized Rhyme is the twelfth studio album by American rapper Fat Joe. It was released on August 28, 2026, by RNG and Empire Distribution. The album features guest appearances by CeeLo Green, Dre from Cool & Dre, Jadakiss, Pusha T, Remy Ma, Steve Mackie, Stove God Cooks and Yung Miami. Production was mainly handled by Cool & Dre but includes other producers like Mike Zombie, Sap, Ed Boi, STREETRUNNER and Tarik Azzouz. It is the follow-up to The World Changed On Me (2024).

== Background ==
On June 11, 2026, Fat Joe released the debut single of the album entitled Victory Lap (HIM), which features Jadakiss and Yung Miami. The song is a tribute to the New York Knicks NBA team's domination during the 2026 NBA Finals.

On July 10, 2026, he released the second single of the album entitled The Aroma, which features Jadakiss, Stove God Cooks and Cool & Dre. The song premiered on Fat Joe and Jadakiss' podcast Joe and Jada.

On August 28, 2026, he released the album. Before the official release, he previewed the album at private listening sessions.

== Track listing ==
Organized Rhyme track listing
No.	Title	Writer(s)	Producer(s)	Length
1.	"Narcos"	Corey Woods; Nasir bin Olu Dara Jones; Marcello Antonio Valenzano; André Christopher Lyon	Cool & Dre; Ed Boi	2:21
2.	"2 Plots" (with CeeLo Green)	Joseph Antonio Cartagena; Thomas DeCarlo Callaway-Burton; Valenzano; Lyon; Nicholas Warwar; Tarik Azzouz	Cool & Dre; STREETRUNNER; Tarik Azzouz	3:38
3.	"The Aroma" (with Jadakiss, Stove God Cooks and Cool & Dre)	Cartagena; Jason Terrance Phillips; Aaron Cook; Valenzano; Lyon; Justin William Rosanio	Cool & Dre	3:41
4.	"Coach Mike Brown" (Interlude)	Cartagena		0:15
5.	"Victory Lap (HIM)" (with Yung Miami and Jadakiss)	Cartagena; Caresha Romeka Brownlee; Phillips; Valenzano; Lyon; William Michael Coleman	Cool & Dre; Mike Zombie	3:22
6.	"Back It Up" (with Cool & Dre)	Cartagena; Valenzano; Lyon; Kevin Gomringer; Tim Gomringer	Cool & Dre	2:19
7.	"Heavy Price to Pay (Chef's Kiss)" (with Cool & Dre and Mike Dean)	Cartagena; Valenzano; Lyon	Cool & Dre	3:15
8.	"Dead or Alive" (with Remy Ma)	Cartagena; Reminisce Kioni Smith; Valenzano; Lyon; Rosanio	Cool & Dre	3:10
9.	"Not Goin'" (with Stove God Cooks)	Cartagena; Cook; Warwar; Azzouz; Lyon; Daryl Franklin Hohl; John William Oates	STREETRUNNER; Tarik Azzouz	2:22
10.	"Set of Keys" (with Pusha T and Dre)	Cartagena; Terrence LeVarr Thornton; Valenzano; Lyon; Rosanio	Cool & Dre	3:05
11.	"Feelin a Way" (with Steven Mackie)	Cartagena; Valenzano; Lyon	Cool & Dre	4:43
12.	"They Wanna Know"	Cartagena; Valenzano; Lyon; Jonathan King; Chucky Thurman	Cool & Dre; Sap	3:50
Total length:				36:07
