= Difficult (Eminem song) =

Unreleased Eminem song

Song by Eminem
- Released: December 30, 2010 (leaked)
- Recorded: c. 2006–2007

"Difficult" is an unreleased song by American rapper Eminem that was leaked online on December 30, 2010, several years after it was recorded. It is a tribute to Proof, Eminem's closest friend, hype man, and fellow member of the rap group D12, who was shot and killed in 2006. A version featuring a chorus by Obie Trice, titled "Dudey", surfaced online on February 11, 2011. Proof's death had a profound impact on Eminem personally, falling into depression and drug abuse.

The song is characterized by a somber sound, both instrumentally and vocally, and lacks a chorus. Eminem tearfully reflects on his friendship with Proof, recalls stories from their youth, and addresses the impact Proof's death had on himself and the hip-hop community. "Difficult" received critical praise from music critics for its emotional tone, with one considering the song to be difficult to listen to. Subsequently, Eminem wrote a dedication to Proof in the liner notes of Relapse (2009), as well as the tribute song "You're Never Over" on Recovery (2010).

== Background ==
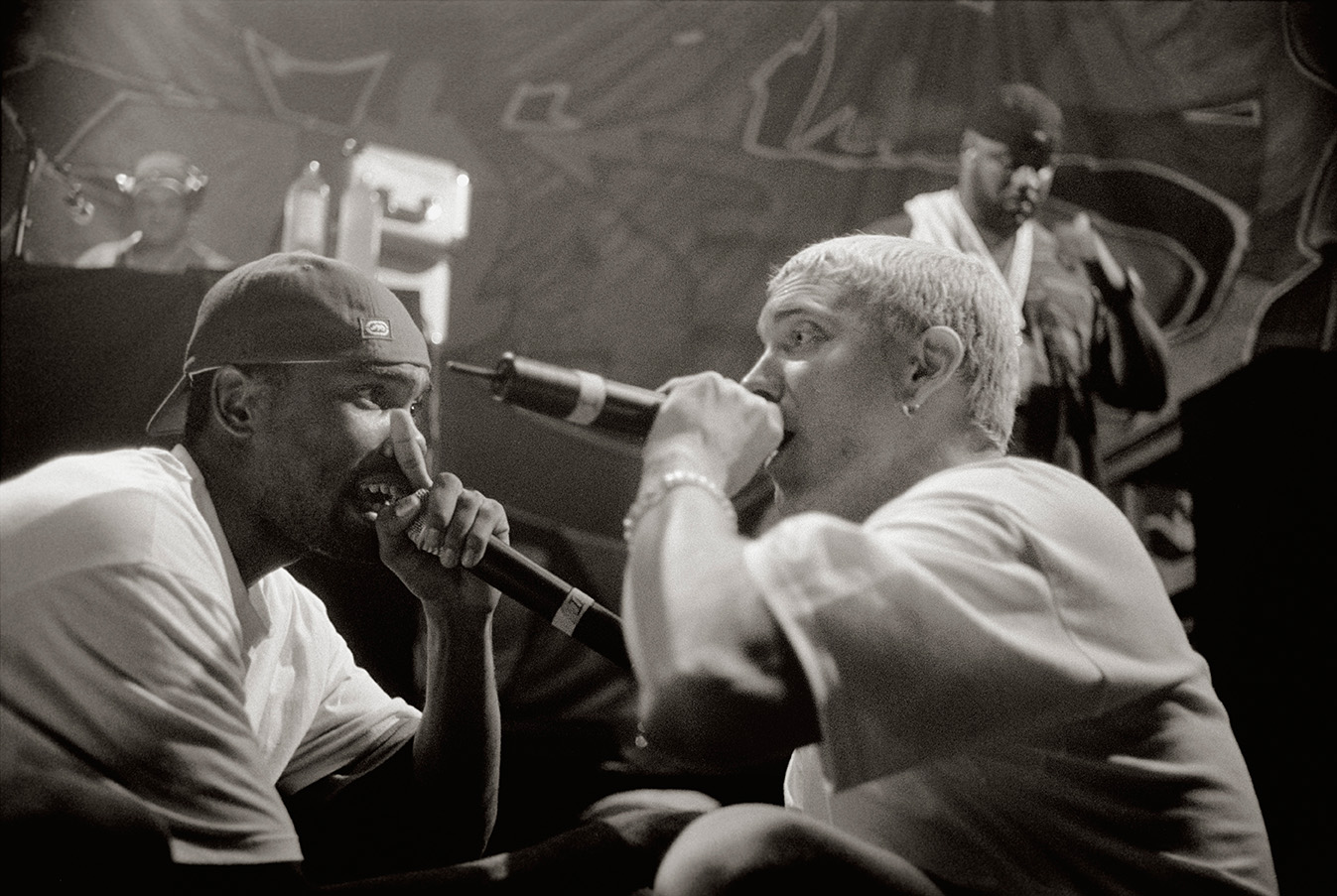
Proof (left) and Eminem performing at Munich in 1999

Proof and Eminem were best friends. The two had been close since they were teenagers, and in later years, they were both members of D12, with Proof also serving as a hype man in Eminem's concerts. In his book The Way I Am, Eminem wrote that Proof helped him find his confidence as a rapper. The circumstances surrounding Proof's death have been the subject of controversy. On April 11, 2006, Proof allegedly shot a fellow patron at the CCC Club in Detroit; a bouncer, who was the patron's cousin, shot Proof in response, killing him. The bouncer was not charged with murder, as he was found to be defending his cousin.

Proof's death had a profound impact on Eminem, who fell into depression and drug abuse. In December 2007, Eminem was hospitalized after a near-fatal accidental methadone overdose, before beginning a twelve-step program to recover from his addiction and becoming sober on April 20, 2008. He relearned to rap and write during the recording sessions for his 2009 album, Relapse. The album was formerly worked on under the title King Mathers back in 2007.

== Leak ==
Before the leak of "Difficult", he had written a dedication to Proof in the liner notes of Relapse and had released the tribute song "You're Never Over" on his 2010 album, Recovery. At the time, he spoke about how he had recorded multiple songs for Proof that he was not satisfied with before "You're Never Over". "Difficult" was leaked on December 30, 2010, and was the fifth unreleased Eminem song to surface online that week. It was recorded several years earlier and, according to HotNewHipHop's Mitch Findlay, it was presumably never intended for release.

=== Alternative version ===
A reworked version of "Difficult", featuring a chorus by Obie Trice (a former member of Eminem's Shady Records) and retaining Eminem's original verses, surfaced online on February 11, 2011, under the title "Dudey". As Eminem raps in the song, "Dudey" (alternatively rendered "Doody" or "Dudie") was a nickname he and Proof used to call each other, the origin of which he does not remember.

== Composition and reception ==
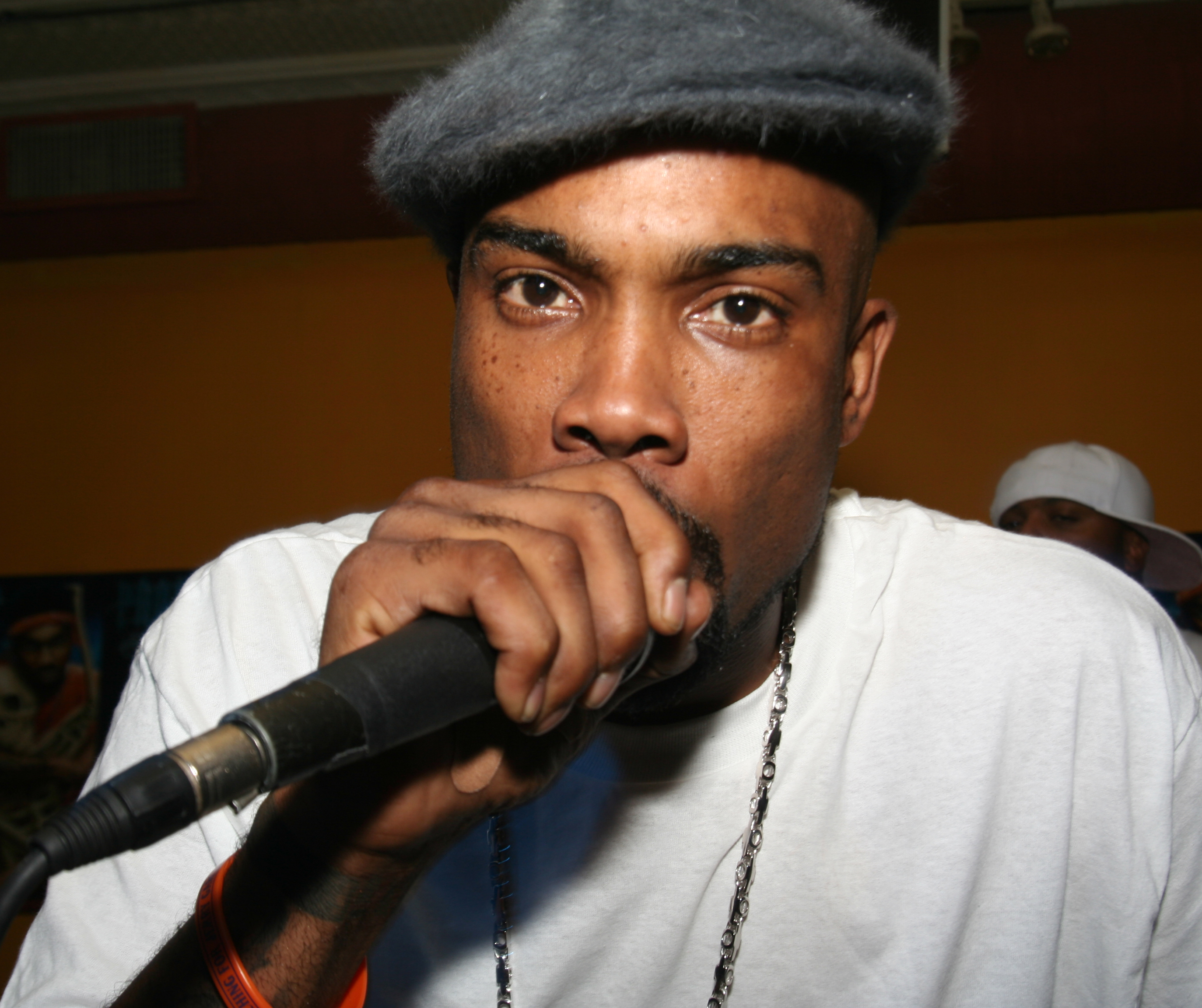
"Difficult" lyrically centers on Eminem's grief and reflection of his friendship with Proof. (pictured in 2005)

A tribute to Proof, "Difficult" is backed by "somber chords and a glacially slow beat". It does not have a chorus; instead, Eminem ends each verse with the phrase "Difficult as it sounds..." In a markedly emotional tone, he raps about his friendship with Proof, recalls stories from their youth, and addresses the impact Proof's death had on himself and their wider circle. On the song, Eminem reflects on often starting at pictures of Proof and felt like he "never got to say I love you as much as I wanted to", grieving how Proof impacted many others despite his death. Eminem then raps about their friendship, in which they considered each other as "brothers" who "never thought about each other's skin colors." He fondly reflects on a memory where he was sunburned with a rolled-up t-shirt while Proof remained unaffected. Alluding to the controversy surrounding Proof's death, Eminem depicts him as someone who was not prone to violence.

Writing for The Awl in 2011, Dave Bry praised the song, saying he got goosebumps listening to the third verse, where Eminem describes finding a jacket Proof left at his wedding, picking it up to smell it, and then framing it and hanging it on his wall "so [he] can always look at it". In 2017, HotNewHipHop's Mitch Findlay ranked "Difficult" as the 13th best Eminem song of all time, calling it a "beautiful tribute" and "a testament to one of the more underrated bromances in hip-hop". Per Findlay, although Eminem had paid his long-awaited tribute to Proof with the officially released "You're Never Over", the "true classic" was the leaked "Difficult". Both Bry and Findlay commented on Eminem's tone: Bry described him as generally sounding tearful, though subtly showing some joy as he recalls Proof teasing him for his sunburned skin and says that he still has to "get back" at him, while Findlay wrote that it is hard not to get emotional hearing Eminem's voice crack when he mentions Proof's casket.

== See also ==
- Down to Earth (Jem album) – features a song dedicated to Proof, "You Will Make It"
- List of murdered hip-hop musicians
