= Legal issues of Chris Brown =

American singer and songwriter Chris Brown has been involved in numerous legal issues since 2009, when he pleaded guilty to felony assault following an altercation with his then-girlfriend, singer Rihanna. The case attracted widespread media attention. He was sentenced to five years of probation, community service, and mandatory domestic violence counseling. In the years since, Brown has faced a number of civil lawsuits and criminal cases arising from allegations of assault and other misconduct, while also taking legal action himself in response to allegations made against him, including defamation lawsuits in which he prevailed.

== Criminal convictions ==
=== 2009 Rihanna domestic violence case ===
At around 12:30 a.m. (PST) on February 8, 2009, Brown and his then-girlfriend, singer Rihanna, had an argument that escalated into physical violence, leaving Rihanna with visible facial injuries that required hospitalization. Brown turned himself in to the LAPD's Wilshire station at 6:30 p.m. and was booked under suspicion of making criminal threats. The police report did not name the female in the incident as is policy, but media sources soon revealed that the victim was Rihanna. Following Brown's arrest, several commercial ads and some TV shows featuring him were suspended, his music was removed from multiple radio stations, and he withdrew from a planned appearance at the NBA All-Star Game. Rihanna and Brown were scheduled to perform separately at the 2009 Grammy Awards on February 9, one day after the assault; Rihanna's intended duet of "Umbrella" with Justin Timberlake was replaced by Timberlake and Al Green singing "Let's Stay Together", while Brown and his song "Forever" were canceled. Brown hired a crisis management team and released a statement saying, "Words cannot begin to express how sorry and saddened I am over what transpired." On February 19, 2009, a graphic photo of Rihanna's battered face was leaked online, reportedly taken after her assault by Chris Brown on February 8. The image, showing bruises, swelling, and a split lip, was first published by TMZ and quickly circulated across media outlets and social platforms, sparking widespread public outrage. The Los Angeles Police Department initiated an internal investigation into the unauthorized release of the photo, considering it a serious misconduct with potential penalties up to termination. Despite this, no criminal charges were filed against the officers involved due to insufficient evidence.

On March 5, 2009, Brown was charged with felony assault and making criminal threats. He was arraigned on April 6, 2009, and pleaded not guilty to one count of assault and one count of making criminal threats. On June 22, 2009, Brown pleaded guilty to the felony assault charge, and accepted a plea deal of community labor, five years of probation, and domestic violence counseling. Several organizations against domestic violence criticized the plea deal, advocating the punishment was not severe enough for the crime; the level of Brown's influence over youth also came under scrutiny. On July 20, 2009, Brown released a two-minute video on his official YouTube page apologizing to fans and Rihanna for the assault, expressing the violence as his "deepest regret" and saying that he has repeatedly apologized to Rihanna and "accepts full responsibility". In the video, Brown said he wanted to speak out earlier about the case but was advised by his attorney not to until the legal ramifications were settled. On August 25, Brown received five years of probation. He was ordered to attend one year of domestic violence counseling and undergo six months of community service; the judge retained a five-year restraining order on Brown, which required him to remain 50 yards (45.72 meters) away from Rihanna, reduced to 10 yards at public events. Andy Kellman of AllMusic stated, "A fairly substantial backlash resulted in Brown's songs being pulled from rotation on several radio stations. Ultimately, however, it had little bearing on the progress of his music and acting careers." In a retrospective assessment, Glamour wrote in a 2025 editorial that "for a man less amiable than the then 19-year-old Brown, the infamous assault, which he pleaded guilty to, could easily have been career-ending. But Brown had boundless talent, good looks, and charisma on his side. The carefully engineered qualities that had established his squeaky-clean persona had created a solid foundation on which he could rebuild his image" in the following years.

On September 2, 2009, Brown spoke about the domestic violence case in a pre-recorded Larry King Live interview, his first public interview about the matter. He was accompanied to the interview by his mother, Joyce Hawkins, and attorney Mark Geragos, as he discussed growing up in a household with his mother being repeatedly assaulted by his stepfather. Brown responded to the details of his assault on Rihanna by saying, "I'm in shock, because, first of all, that's not who I am as a person, and that's not who I promise I want to be." Brown's mother said Brown "has never, ever been a violent person, ever" and that she does not believe in the cycle of violence. Brown said that it is "tough" for him to look at the famous photograph released of Rihanna's battered face, which may be the one image to haunt and define him forever, and that he still loved her. "I'm pretty sure we can always be friends," said Brown, "and I don't know about our relationship, but I just know definitely that we ended as friends." He stated he did not feel that his career was over, and likened his relationship with Rihanna to Romeo and Juliet, blaming the negative media outcry for driving them apart.

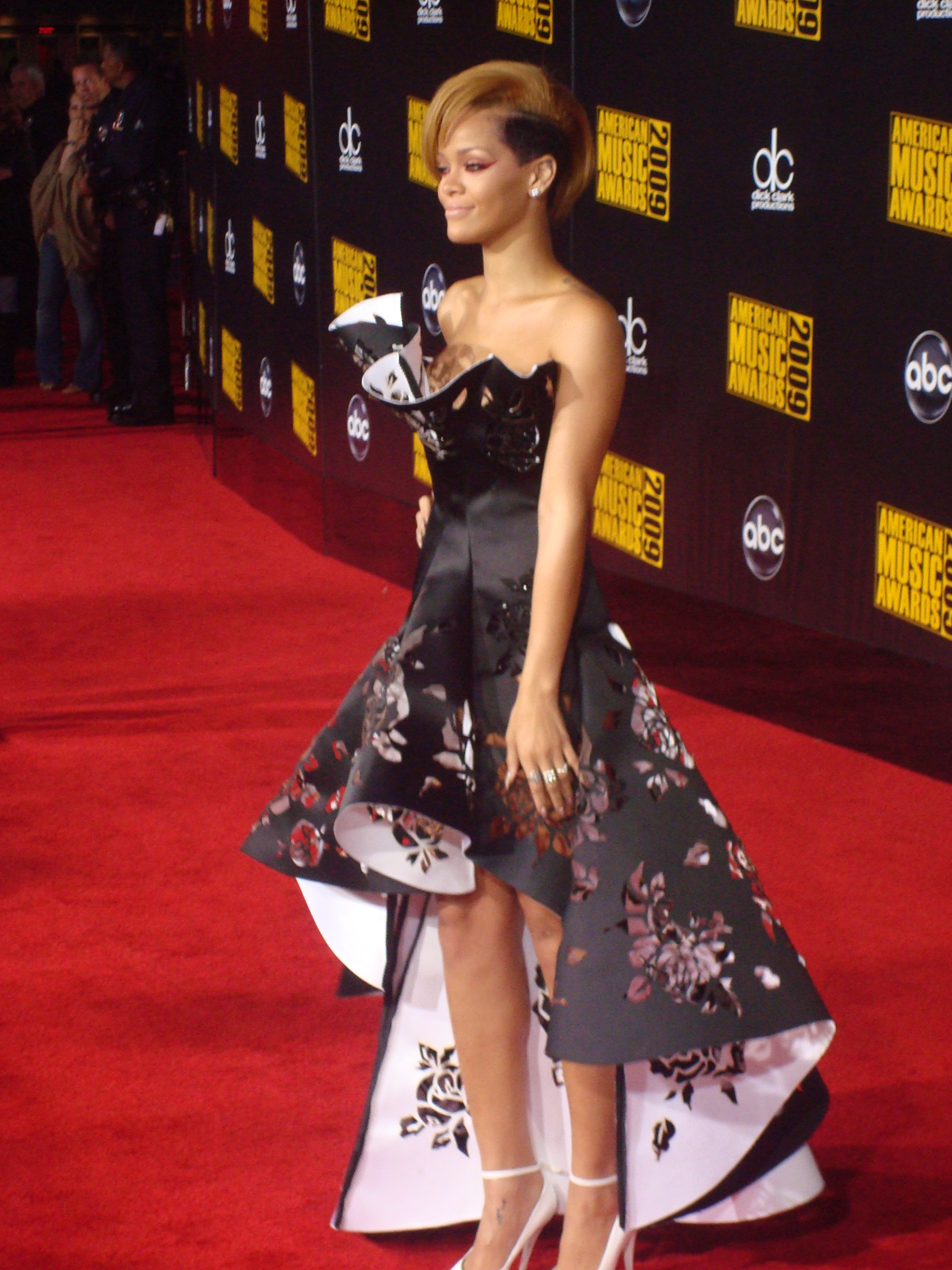
Rihanna in November 2009, nine months after Brown assaulted her

In June 2010, Brown's application for a visa to enter the UK was rejected on the grounds of him "being guilty of a serious criminal offence" due to his assault on Rihanna. Brown had been planning to do a tour of British cities as part of a European tour but Sony stated that due to "issues surrounding his work visa" the tour was to be postponed. In February 2011, at the request of Brown's lawyer, Judge Patricia Schnegg modified with Rihanna's agreement the restraining order to a "level one order," allowing both singers to appear at awards shows together in the future. The following month, on March 22, 2011, during an interview with Robin Roberts on Good Morning America at the Times Square Studios, where he was repeatedly asked about the Rihanna assault and restraining order, Brown started crying and became violent in his dressing room during a commercial break before his second performance ending that day's program, and punched a window overlooking Times Square, breaking it. He then took off his shirt, and after angry confrontations with the show staff and building security, left the building shirtless. The following day, he apologized during live appearance on BET's "106 & Park": "First of all, I want to apologize to anybody who was startled in the office, or anybody who was offended or really looked, and [was] disappointed at my actions, because I'm disappointed in the way I acted".

On July 11, 2012, Brown's community service was evaluated and he was ordered to meet a judge. The evaluation was ordered by Superior Court Judge Patricia Schnegg on July 10, 2012. He was scheduled to appear in court on August 21, 2012. While conducting his community service in Virginia, however, Brown was tested positive for cannabis and appeared in court on September 25, 2012, at which time his hearing date was changed to November, to determine whether or not he had violated the terms of his court order. He reappeared in court on November 1, 2012, and attempted to speak to the judge, but his lawyer, Mark Geragos, told him, "I don't dance; you don't talk." In January 2013, Rihanna confirmed that she and Brown had resumed their romantic relationship, stating, "It's different now. We don't have those types of arguments anymore. We talk about shit. We value each other. We know exactly what we have now, and we don't want to lose that." Speaking of Brown, Rihanna also said, "He's not the monster everybody thinks. He's a good person. He has a fantastic heart. He's giving and loving. And he's fun to be around. That's what I love about him – he always makes me laugh. All I want to do is laugh, really – and I do that with him". Rihanna and Brown collaborated again on "Nobody's Business", a duet song off Rihanna's Unapologetic album. The song was noted by critics as a public response by the couple towards the public perception of their intimacy. On March 20, 2015, Brown's probation ended, formally closing the felony case emanating from the Rihanna assault which happened over six years prior.

In his 2017 self-documentary Welcome to My Life, Brown opened up about his relationship with Rihanna and the 2009 assault. Rihanna granted Brown permission to talk about her and show images that include her in the documentary, but she declined to appear in person. Brown described their relationship as initially a "fairytale" and stated that he intended to marry Rihanna, but explained that it deteriorated after he admitted to being unfaithful with a woman who worked for him, leading to a loss of trust. He stated, "My trust totally was lost with her. She hated me after that… From there, it just went downhill". Brown recounted the night of the violent altercation. He described how an argument escalated after Rihanna found a text message on his phone from the former employee, leading to a physical altercation in a car. Brown then provided a detailed description of the fight, saying that Rihanna tried to kick him, then he responded punching her, injuring her lip, and described the altercation as a heated, escalating fight that took place while they were driving. He recalled feeling shocked afterward. Reflecting on the incident and its aftermath, Brown addressed the widely circulated photograph of Rihanna’s injuries, saying, "I look back at that picture and I’m like: ‘That’s not me, bro, that’s not me. I hate it to this day. That’s going to haunt me forever.’" He said that following the assault he felt “like a f–king monster,” revealed that he had contemplated suicide, and acknowledged the incident dramatically changed his public image. Brown also addressed how witnessing domestic violence during his childhood affected his own behavior. He acknowledged that exposure to his mother’s partner’s abusive actions played a role in the 2009 incident, describing it as “learned behavior.”

=== 2013 Washington, D.C. assault and probation violation ===
In October 2013, Brown was arrested for felony assault in Washington, D.C., after refusing to take a picture with a man, and throwing a punch that broke the man's nose. The charge was reduced to a misdemeanor. Brown spent 36 hours in a Washington jail and was taken to court in shackles. He was released and ordered to report to his California probation officer within 48 hours.

On October 30, 2013, Brown voluntarily entered rehab. After Brown completed his 90 days, the judge ordered him to remain a resident at the Malibu treatment facility until a hearing on April 23, 2014. The deal was if Brown left rehab, he would go to jail. On March 14, 2014, Brown was kicked out of the rehab facility and sent to Northern Neck Regional Jail for violating internal rules. He was expected to be released on April 23, 2014, but a judge denied his release request from custody either on bail or his own recognizance. At his May 9, 2014, court date, Brown was ordered to serve 131 days in jail for his probation violation. He was sentenced to serve 365 days in custody; however, the judge gave him credit for 234 days he had already spent in rehab and jail, as well as credits for good behavior while behind bars. Brown was released from jail on June 2, 2014.

=== 2023 Nightclub assault ===
On May 15, 2025, Brown was arrested in Manchester, England, on a 2023 warrant issued against him for a grievous bodily harm charge. The charge resulted from an alleged incident which involved Brown smashing a Don Julio tequila bottle over music producer Abraham Diaw's head while at Tape, a private members' club in Mayfair, London, on February 19, 2023. Brown would then be detained by London's Metropolitan Police. Diaw has also filed a civil claim against Brown for £12m ($16m) in damages which are related to the injuries and losses he suffered during the alleged 2023 London nightclub incident. On May 16, the Manchester Magistrates' Court ordered Brown to remain in custody until at least June 13, 2025, when his case will be heard before the Southwark Crown court in London. The charges against Brown for the alleged assault on Diaw carry a maximum penalty of 16 years in prison. British police also charged Omololu Akinlolu, a rapper known by his stage name HoodyBaby, in connection with the alleged assault.

On May 21, 2025, Brown was released on £5 million ($6,771,950USD) bail by the London court and was permitted to commence his "Breezy Bowl XX" world tour next month in accordance with his bail conditions. On June 20, 2025, Brown pleaded not guilty at Southwark Crown Court to a charge of attempting to cause grievous bodily harm. On June 27, Diaw requested that the suit be dismissed with prejudice. On July 11, he entered not guilty pleas to two further charges: assault occasioning actual bodily harm and possession of an offensive weapon, relating to the same incident. He appeared at Southwark for a pre-trial hearing on January 28, 2026. Brown waved to fans and signed autographs as he left the courthouse. His trial has been scheduled to begin on October 26, 2026, alongside co-defendant Omololu Akinlolu.

On July 24, 2026, Brown pleaded guilty to affray, and the charges of assault, attempting to cause grievous bodily harm, and having an offensive weapon were dropped. Akinlolu also pleaded guilty to affray, and the charges against him of assault and attempted grievous bodily harm were dropped. Supporters gathered outside Southwark Crown Court during the hearing. Brown waved to fans as he arrived and was met by cheers from supporters as he left the courthouse, where he also signed autographs.

On October 26, 2026, Brown and Akinlolu were sentenced. Brown was given a suspended sentence of imprisonment for eight months, suspended for one year. Akinlolu was given a suspended sentence of four months, also suspended for one year. Judge Anthony Baumgartner described Brown's actions as "serious, public violence". In addition, both men were ordered to pay £1,500 in costs.

== Allegations ==
=== 2012 Drake scuffle ===
On June 14, 2012, Drake and his entourage were involved in a scuffle with Brown at a nightclub called W.i.P. in the SoHo neighborhood of New York City. Five to eight people were reportedly injured during the 4 AM brawl, including San Antonio Spurs star Tony Parker, who had surgery to remove a piece of glass from his eye. Parker stated that doctors told him he nearly lost his eye.

Brown's attorney alleged Drake was the instigator and threw a bottle. Drake’s attorney denied this claim. Brown tweeted about the incident and publicly criticized Drake. Neither Drake nor Brown were criminally charged. Drake, Brown, Brown’s bodyguard, Tony Parker, a model, and the nightclub filed lawsuits related to the incident. Drake and Brown’s bodyguard suggested the dispute involved tensions over Drake’s relationship with singer Rihanna, Brown’s former girlfriend. Brown and Drake later reconciled and in 2022, Brown stated the incident was humorous and caused by a misunderstanding by both parties.

=== 2013 Frank Ocean altercation ===
In January 2013, Brown was involved in an altercation with Frank Ocean over a parking space outside a recording studio in West Hollywood. Police officers in Los Angeles said Brown was under investigation, describing the incident as "battery" due to Brown allegedly punching Ocean. Ocean said he would not press charges, while a member of Ocean’s entourage and Brown sued each other over the incident.

According to the police report, Ocean told investigators that he confronted Brown in the lobby of Westlake Recording Studios after seeing him parked in his assigned space. Ocean said Brown extended his hand, but after he refused to shake it and reiterated that Brown was in his parking spot, Brown punched him in the face. Ocean alleged that Brown’s associates, Omololu Akinolou and Glass John, then joined the attack, pushing him into a corner and attempting to kick him while he was on the ground. The entire altercation, according to Ocean, lasted approximately one to two minutes. According to Jamaican singer Sean Kingston, who was present during the altercation, Ocean and his cousin instigated the fight and were at fault. The two artists previously feuded on Twitter in 2011.

=== 2013 Hit and run ===
The "Hit and Run" incident occurred on May 21st 2013, where Chris Brown rear-ended his Range Rover into another car with his girlfriend, Karrueche, riding shotgun and was spotted taking pictures. In July 2013, Brown's probation was revoked after he was involved in the alleged hit and run in Los Angeles. He was released from court and scheduled to reappear in August 2013 to learn whether he would serve time in prison. The charges would later be dropped, but Brown would have 1,000 additional hours of community service added to his probation terms.

=== 2018 Photographer assault case ===
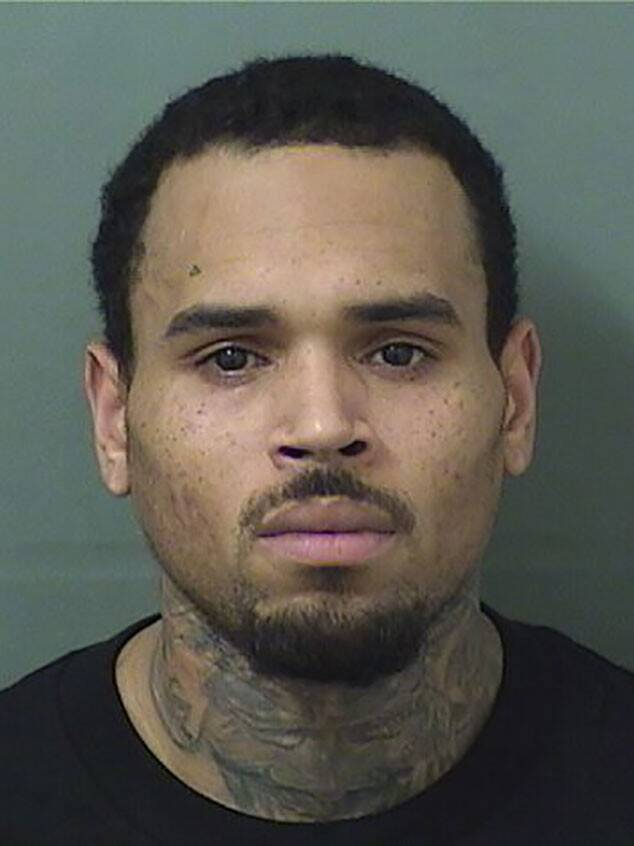
Brown's 2018 mug shot.

On the night of July 6, 2018, Brown was arrested after his concert on a felony battery charge stemming from an incident that occurred more than a year before. The battery charge was connected to an April 2017 incident in a Tampa club, where Brown allegedly punched a man who photographed him without his permission. The Palm Beach County Sheriff's Office said Brown was released after about an hour, after that he posted $2,000 bond. On August 16, 2019, the state of Florida dropped the battery charge on Brown.

== Civil cases ==
=== 2016 Mike G assault case ===
In June 2016, Chris Brown was sued for assault, false imprisonment and battery by Mike G, the singer's former manager, hired in 2012 to help him repair his public image. Mike G claimed that on May 10 of that year, Brown assaulted him, locked him in a room and punched him four times in the face and neck. Subsequently, Brown accused Mike G on his social media accounts of stealing money while working for him and being fired for it, an accusation that the manager later denied. In 2019, the lawsuit was settled out of court, with Brown and the manager informing courts that both parties have reconciled their differences and reached a confidential deal.

=== 2017 Karrueche Tran restraining order ===
In 2017, Brown's ex-girlfriend Karrueche Tran was granted a 5-year restraining order against him by a judge in Santa Monica, California, after she shared text messages and voicemails in court where Brown threatened her and demanded she return diamond rings and other gifts given during their relationship. Brown did not appear at the restraining order hearing and publicly denied the allegations, stating: "She doesn't need a restraining from me. I need one from them. (...) And I will not just accept any papers from any lawyer and I will not go to court admit guilt to further tarnish who I am. I pled guilty in the Rihanna case because I was. I refuse to allow these evil hearted people to label me and lie because they think it will skyrocket their career. Just stay away from me."

=== 2021 Housekeeper disfigurement in dog mauling incident ===
In 2021, housekeeper Patricia Avila filed a lawsuit against Brown in a Van Nuys court in Los Angeles, alleging physical and psychological injuries she suffered after her sister, Maria Avila, was attacked by the singer’s Caucasian shepherd dog while she, too, was working as a housekeeper outside Brown’s home in Tarzana, California, on December 20, 2020. The Avila sisters and the victim’s husband sought a total of $90 million in damages. Brown had argued that the dog was kept on the property for security reasons and that he had warned the domestic workers of the animal’s presence. During the trial, testimony revealed that the dog’s presence in the home’s backyard had not been reported and that, at the time of the incident, Brown instead of calling for help himself or assisting Avila, fled the scene, stating that he feared a “media circus” would ensue if he were present when the police arrived. In June 2026, at the conclusion of the trial, Brown and his company, Black Pyramid LLC, were ordered to pay $13 million.

== Defamation lawsuits ==
=== 2016 false gun threat allegation and defamation lawsuit ===
In the early hours of August 30, 2016, a woman called the police and accused Brown of threatening her with a gun inside his house in Tarzana, California. Police were called, but Brown denied them entry without a warrant. When they returned with one, Brown refused them entry and began what news sources referred to as a "standoff" with the LAPD, including the robbery-homicide division and SWAT team. During this time, Brown was seen posting videos on Instagram, in which he rails against the police and the media coverage of the activity at his house. He denounced media reports that he was "barricaded" inside his house, complained about the helicopters flying overhead, and called the police "idiots" and "the worst gang in the world." He said that he was innocent and "What I do care about is you are defacing [sic] my name and my character and integrity". Brown was arrested and later released from jail on $250,000 bail. On September 1, 2016, Brown's lawyer, Mark Geragos, stated that there was no standoff and that, with regard to the LAPD search, "nothing was found to corroborate her statement." Charges were later dropped after prosecutors declined to arraign Brown on the felony charges. Brown later sued the accuser for defamation, prevailing in the lawsuit, after it was ruled that the defendant brought to court false and defamatory statements about Brown, through her incriminating text messages where she said that "Brown kicked [her] out of his house because [she] called his friend jewelry fake" and she was "going to set him up and call the cops and say that he tried to shoot [her]". Brown later told Good Morning America: "My character’s been defaced. I’m glad that all my real supporters know me and know the truth and they’ll see the truth."

=== 2022 dismissed rape allegation and defamation lawsuit ===
In January 2022, a woman named Dasia Chantel Frank filed a $20 million civil lawsuit against Brown for allegedly raping her on a yacht owned by music producer Sean "Diddy" Combs in Miami in December 2020. Brown denied the allegations and later submitted text messages and voicemails to the Miami police department which implied a consensual relationship with the accuser. In the text messages the woman addressed Brown using lewd language and sent nude "selfie" pictures almost immediately after the alleged rape took place. According to TMZ, Brown intended to counter-sue the plaintiff for defamation and the plaintiff's lawyer withdrew from the case after she was made aware of the messages and voicemails. The presiding judge dismissed the lawsuit due to lack of prosecution by the plaintiff in August 2022. The lawsuit was dismissed on procedural grounds without prejudice, meaning the case can be reinstated under proper legal grounds if the plaintiff intends to pursue it again.

Following the highly publicized controversies sparked by Diddy's 2023 and 2024 accusations, the docuseries Chris Brown: A History of Violence aired on October 27, 2024. The docuseries is based on the 2022 rape allegation and features the accuser, who appears in silhouette in the documentary to shield her identity, explaining in her televised interview that she is speaking out to "shed light on what really happened." In January 2025, Brown filed a lawsuit against Warner Bros. for $500 million over Chris Brown: A History of Violence, which aired in October 2024 on Investigation Discovery. The singer’s lawyers said the film is "defamatory", and the accuser’s claims were "baseless" and "sensationalised". In 2026, LA Superior Court judge Colin Leis allowed Brown's defamation lawsuit against the woman who accused him of sexual assault in the 2020 yacht incident to proceed, but dismissed Brown's defamation lawsuit against Warner Bros.
