= Lord Above =

2019 song by Fat Joe and Dre

Song by Fat Joe and Dre featuring Eminem and Mary J. Blige

from the album Family Ties
- Released: December 6, 2019
- Genre: Hip hop
- Length: 4:55
- Label: RNG; EMPIRE
- Songwriter(s): Joseph Cartagena; Andre Lyon; Marshall Mathers; Mary J. Blige; Marcello Valenzano; Rayshon Cobbs Jr.
- Producer(s): Cool & Dre; 808 Ray

"Lord Above" is a song by American rappers Fat Joe and Dre featuring fellow American rapper Eminem and American singer Mary J. Blige released from the former two's collaborative studio album Family Ties on December 6, 2019 via RNG (Rap's New Generation) and EMPIRE, produced by 808 Ray and Cool & Dre. Not released as a single, it still peaked at No. 97 on the U.S. Billboard Hot 100 and No. 44 on the Hot R&B/Hip-Hop Songs.

To promote the album, Fat Joe billed his Eminem collaboration as "the most disrespectful song". In his verse, Eminem disses Nick Cannon and Mariah Carey, rapping: "I know me and Mariah didn't end on a high note / But that other dude's whipped, that pussy got him neutered / Tried to tell him this chick's a nut job before he got his jewels clipped / Almost got my caboose kicked, fool, quit, you not gon' do shit / I let her chop my balls off, too 'fore I lost to you, Nick."

On December 9, 2019, Cannon responded with a diss track, "The Invitation", featuring Hitman Holla, Charlie Clips and Prince Eazy, whom Cannon referred to as "The Black Squad" and Suge Knight. After Eminem responded to Cannon with two tweets, Cannon released a second diss track the next day featuring the same rappers as well as Conceited titled "Pray For Him", followed by another solo diss track entitled "The Invitation Canceled".

== Personnel ==
- Andre "Dre" Lyon – main artist, vocals, producer, songwriter
- Joseph Cartagena – main artist, vocals, songwriter
- Marshall Mathers – featured artist, vocals, songwriter
- Mary J. Blige – featured artist, vocals, songwriter
- Marcello Valenzano – producer, songwriter
- Rayshon Cobbs Jr. – producer, songwriter

== Charts ==
Chart (2019)	Peak position
US Billboard Hot 100	97
US Hot R&B/Hip-Hop Songs (Billboard)	44
