= Stat Quo discography =

This is the discography of Stat Quo, an American rapper/producer from Atlanta, Georgia.

== Albums ==
=== Studio albums ===
Year	Title	Chart positions	
Year	Title	US	US R&B
2010	Statlanta: Released: July 13, 2010; Label: Dream Big Ventures	—	85
2014	ATLA: All This Life Allows, Vol. 1: Released: February 25, 2014; Label: ATLA Music	—	—

=== Independent albums ===
Year	Title
2009	Smokin Mirrors: Released: April 21, 2009; Label: Gracie Productions
2009	Great Depression: Released: October 20, 2009; Label: Gracie Productions

=== Mixtapes ===
- Underground Atlanta Volumes 1-4 (2003-2006)
- Street Status (2005)
- Grown Man Music (with DJ Drama) (2006)
- Big Business (with Chamillionaire) (2006)
- Zone 3 (with DJ Whoo Kid) (2006)
- Road to Statlanta (with DJ Smallz) (2007)
- Now or Never (with DJ Noodles) (2007)
- Statistically Speaking (with DJ Nik Bean & DJ Felli Fel) (2008)
- The South Got Somethin to Say (2008)
- The Bailout (2008)
- Hip Hop is My Life (with DJ LRM) (2009)
- Quo City (2009)
- Checks & Balance (2009)
- The Invisible Man (2009)
- The Status Report (with DJ Black Bill Gates) (2009)
- 2010 (2010)

== Singles ==
Year	Song	Chart positions			Album
Year	Song	U.S.	U.S. R&B	U.S. Rap	Album
2005	"Like Dat"	—	—	—	NBA Live 06 OST and Statlanta (Unreleased Version)
2007	"Here We Go"	—	—	—	Statlanta (Unreleased Version)
2007	"G.R.I.T.S. (Girls Raised in the South)"	—	—	—	Statlanta (Unreleased Version)
2009	"Ghetto USA" (featuring Antonio McLendon)	—	—	—	Statlanta
2010	"Success"	—	—	—	Statlanta
2013	"Michael"	—	—	—	ATLA: All This Life Allows, Vol. 1
2013	"Trillion" (featuring Dre of Cool & Dre)	—	—	—	ATLA: All This Life Allows, Vol. 1

== Guest appearances ==
Year	Song	Artist(s)	Album
2004	"Stop the Show"	The Alchemist, M.O.P.	1st Infantry
2004	"Walk With Me"	Young Buck	Straight Outta Ca$hville
2004	"Spend Some Time"	Eminem, Obie Trice, 50 Cent	Encore
2005	"I Ain't Playin'"	Grafh	The Preview
2005	"Come See Me"	Smoke of Field Mob	Ludacris Presents: Disturbing tha Peace
2006	"We're Back"	Eminem, Obie Trice, Bobby Creekwater, Ca$his	Eminem Presents: The Re-Up
2006	"By My Side"	none	Eminem Presents: The Re-Up
2006	"Tryin' ta Win"	none	Eminem Presents: The Re-Up
2006	"Smack That (Remix)"	Akon, Bobby Creekwater	Eminem Presents: The Re-Up
2006	"Get Low"	none	Eminem Presents: The Re-Up
2006	"Cry Now (Shady Remix)"	Obie Trice, Kuniva, Bobby Creekwater, Ca$his	Eminem Presents: The Re-Up
2006	"Billion Bucks"	none	Eminem Presents: The Re-Up and Statlanta (Unreleased Version)
2006	"U Ain't Kno"	Bun B	Gangsta Grillz Legends Series
2007	"Freestyle"	DJ Whoo Kid	G-Unit Radio Part 5: All Eyez on Us
2008	"On Top Now"	Bishop Lamont	Caltroit
2008	"Guerilla Pimpin'"	Bishop Lamont, Warren G, Busta Rhymes	The Confessional
2008	"Whatcha Call Dat"	Tito '6	King of the Greatlakes
2008	"Hold Up"	Chyna Whyte, Bun B, Chamillionaire	Whyte Out
2009	"Soldier"	Willy Northpole, Royce Da 5'9", Marques Elliott	Haveit Music Presents...Shutup & Listen, Vol. 1
2010	"Syllables"	Eminem, Jay-Z, Dr. Dre, 50 Cent, Cashis	none
2011	"Amensia"	Ski Beatz, Nicole Wray	24 Hour Karate School Pt. 2
2011	"You Already Know"	Ski Beatz, GLC	24 Hour Karate School Pt. 2
2012	"Far From Coach"	Wiz Khalifa, The Game	none
2013	"Compton"	The Game	OKE: Operation Kill Everything
2014	"I Just Wanna Be"	The Game	Blood Moon: Year of the Wolf
2016	"Crazy"	Bishop Lamont	The Reformation G.D.N.I.A.F.T
