= The County Hound EP =

EP by Ca$his
- Released: May 22, 2007
- Recorded: 2006–2007
- Studios: 54 Sound, Detroit, Michigan; Blocc Boyz Studios, Aliso Viejo, California
- Genres: Hip hop; gangsta rap
- Length: 32:35
- Labels: Shady; G's Up; Interscope
- Producers: Eminem (also exec.); Luis Resto; Ron Browz; Rikanatti; Keno; Mike Elizondo

Ca$his chronology
The County Hound EP (2007)	The Art of Dying (2012)

Singles from The County Hound EP
- 1. "Lac Motion" Released: August 1, 2007

The County Hound EP is the debut extended play (EP) by American rapper Cashis. It was released on May 22, 2007, by Shady Records, G's Up and Interscope Records. The EP was released to promote his planned album, Loose Cannon (which was subsequently shelved), and to bring attention to him as an artist. Eminem produced or co-produced the whole album except for a single song, which he also serves as the executive producer. It sold 6,700 copies its first week of release and debuted on the Billboard 200 at number 106.

Cashis's second studio album entitled as The County Hound 2, was released independently on October 15, 2013 through Bogish Boy Entertainment, as a sequel.

== Release and promotion ==
Cashis first made his mark appearing on the single "You Don't Know" on Eminem's compilation album, Eminem Presents: The Re-Up (2006), performing solo on the songs "Everything Is Shady" and "Talkin' All That". His solo track "Talkin' All That" was praised by Complex as an album standout.

In May 2007, Cashis released the eight-track The County Hound EP in an attempt to have people "fiend" for his music, or garner interest in it. The album was released as a limited edition EP.

Cashis first solo video "'Lac Motion" gained MTV airplay, with no promotion, which prepared the way for Cashis's debut album, Loose Cannon.

== Music and songs ==
On The County Hound EP, Cashis hits listeners with vignettes from the life of a hustler ("That Nigga's Gangsta," "Gun Rule," and "Pistol Poppin"), remorseful self-examination ("Ms. Jenkins"), and reflections on life and death in the rap industry ("Thoughts Of Suicide"). Eminem produces five of The County Hound EP's eight cuts and spits a guest verse alongside Cashis on "Pistol Poppin'". Rikanatti, Keno, Luis Resto, Mike Elizondo and Ron Browz round out the production team.

== Critical reception ==
Professional ratings
Review scores
Source	Rating
DJBooth	4/5 stars
HipHopDX	2.5/5 stars
PopMatters	7/10 stars

The EP was met with mixed reviews upon its release from music critics. Some critics praised it as a solid introduction to Cashis, however others put down the gangster themes of the album's tracks. Hip-hop magazine PopMatters gave the album a 7/10 (Stars) rating, saying "First appearing on last year’s release, Eminem Presents: The Re-Up, this new addition to the Shady Records roster is now formally introduced with a throwback to the full-length EP format. Eminem’s hands at production for five of The County Hound EP’s eight total tracks are very obvious though he appears vocally only for a guest verse on “Pistol Poppin’”, and production from the likes of up-and-comers like Rikanatti make this less of an Eminem show than we’re accustomed to. Lyrics of reflection and self-examination on tracks like “Thoughts of Suicide” and “Ms. Jenkins” suggest that Cashis may actually be able to talk his way out of the traditional trap of the superstar's shadow. It's a solid introduction".

== Commercial performance ==
The County Hound EP debuted at number 106 on the US Billboard 200, with 6,700 copies sold in its first week. The EP peaked at number one on the Top Heatseekers, at number 14 on the Top Rap Albums, and at number 37 on the Top R&B/Hip-Hop Albums.

== Track listing ==
No.	Title	Writer(s)	Producer(s)	Length
1.	"County Hound" (Intro)	Ramone Johnson; Marshall Mathers	Eminem	0:55
2.	"That Nigga A Gangsta"	Johnson; Ricky Parham	Rikanatti; Eminem^{[a]}	4:37
3.	"Gun Rule"	Johnson; Mathers; Luis Resto	Eminem	4:02
4.	"Ms. Jenkins"	Johnson; Mathers; Mike Elizondo; Parham; Freddie Mercury	Eminem; Elizondo^{[a]}; Rikanatti^{[a]}	5:38
5.	"Just Like Me"	Johnson; Parham; B. Holland; J. Nortin	Rikanatti; Keno	4:56
6.	"Pistol Poppin'" (featuring Eminem)	Johnson; Mathers; Resto; Jeff Bass	Eminem; Resto	4:17
7.	"Thoughts Of Suicide"	Johnson; Rondell Turner; Mathers	Ron Browz; Eminem^{[a]}	3:10
8.	"'Lac Motion" (Bonus Track)	Johnson; Mathers; Resto; Bass	Eminem	4:53
Total length:				32:35

Notes

- ^{^{[a]}} signifies an additional producer.
- "County Hound" (Intro) contains additional vocals by Stevion "Big Box" Boyd.

Sample credits

- "Ms. Jenkins" contains elements of "Bohemian Rhapsody", written by Freddie Mercury and performed by Queen.

== Personnel ==
Credits for The County Hound EP adapted from AllMusic.

- Jeff Bass – bass, guitar, keyboards
- Jules Bass – composer
- Ron Browz – producer
- Tony Campana – engineer
- Cashis – primary artist
- DJ Arcane – engineer
- Mike Elizondo – producer
- Eminem – executive producer, guest artist, mixing, primary artist, producer
- Steve King – bass, guitar
- Dart Parker – A&R
- Luis Resto – keyboards, producer

== Charts ==
Chart (2007)	Peak position
US Billboard 200	106
US Top Heatseekers (Billboard)	1
US Top Rap Albums (Billboard)	14
US Top R&B/Hip-Hop Albums (Billboard)	37

== See also ==
- The County Hound 2
- The County Hound 3
