= The B.C. Era Deuce EP =

EP by Bobby Creekwater
- Released: May 1, 2009
- Recorded: 2009
- Genre: Hip hop
- Label: BGOV; Shady; Interscope
- Producer: Bobby Creekwater; D. Focis; Junior Varsity

Bobby Creekwater chronology
Anthem 2 Da Streetz III (2009)	The B.C. Era Deuce EP (2009)	The Day It All Made Sense (2009)

The B.C. Era Deuce EP is an EP by American rapper Bobby Creekwater, released under BGOV, Shady and Interscope and proceeded The B.C. Era EP. The album contains eleven tracks almost all produced by himself and D. Focis, and only one song was produced by Junior Varsity. It features guest appearances from Mykey, Bohagon, Mykel, Jimmy Cravity, Charlie Skrill, Stat Quo, and Sandman.

== Track listing ==
No.	Title	Producer	Length
1.	"Him & Her" (skit)		0:51
2.	"Hey" (featuring Mykey)	Bobby Creekwater	2:38
3.	"Throw Da Deuce"	Bobby Creekwater	3:32
4.	"The Message" (skit)		0:14
5.	"Dreamin" (featuring Bohagon & Mykel)	D. Focis	2:52
6.	"Winner" (featuring Jimmy Cravity)	Bobby Creekwater	3:33
7.	"Spaceship"	Junior Varsity	3:53
8.	"Ridin Muzik" (featuring Charlie Skrill)	D. Focis	3:16
9.	"Tryin to Make It" (featuring Stat Quo & Sandman)	D. Focis	3:50
10.	"B.C. Era"	D. Focis	3:00
11.	"Make Believe"	Bobby Creekwater	4:09

== Personnel ==
- Bobby Creekwater - vocals, producer
- D. Focis - producer

=== Additional personnel ===
- Junior Varsity - producer on "Spaceship"
- Mykey - additional performer on "Hey"
- Bohagon - additional performer on "Dreamin'"
- Mykel - additional performer on "Dreamin'"
- Jimmy Cravity - additional performer on "Winner"
- Charlie Skrill - additional performer on "Ridin' Muzik"
- Stat Quo - additional performer on "Tryin' to Make It"
- Sandman - additional performer on "Tryin' to Make It"
