= Jimmy Crack Corn (Eminem song) =

2007 single by Eminem, 50 Cent and Cashis

Single by Eminem and 50 Cent

from the album Eminem Presents: The Re-Up
- Released: March 6, 2007
- Recorded: 2003; 2006
- Genre: Hardcore hip hop
- Length: 3:54
- Label: Shady; Interscope
- Songwriters: Marshall Mathers; Curtis Jackson; Luis Resto
- Producers: Eminem; Luis Resto (add.)

Eminem singles chronology
"You Don't Know" (2006)	"Jimmy Crack Corn" (2007)	"Crack a Bottle" (2009)

50 Cent singles chronology
"You Don't Know" (2006)	"Jimmy Crack Corn" (2007)	"Straight to the Bank" (2007)

Cashis singles chronology
"You Don't Know" (2006)	"Jimmy Crack Corn" (2007)	"Lac Motion" (2007)

"Jimmy Crack Corn" is the second and final single taken from the Shady Records compilation album Eminem Presents: The Re-Up. The song features vocals from Eminem and 50 Cent, and the single version features vocals from Cashis, who also featured on "You Don't Know". "Jimmy Crack Corn" was the last single that Eminem released before his December 2007 drug overdose, in which he almost died, but it was recorded back in 2003.

== Background ==
The song did not receive an official release or chart in the United Kingdom or United States. The song peaked at number one on the Bubbling Under Hot 100 chart in the United States for two weeks, due to strong downloads from The Re-Up. The song also managed to chart on the Pop 100 peaking at No. 77, staying on the chart for two non-consecutive weeks. The song refers to Interscope chairman Jimmy Iovine, and it also mentions how Eminem allegedly had sexual relations with Mariah Carey. The single version of the song features vocals from Cashis in place of 50 Cent's vocals, but with no new Eminem verse.

== Critical response ==
Robert Christgau was positive: "the Em-50 duet "Jimmy Crack Corn," an egocentric return to the rhythms of the visionary anti-George W. Bush "Square Dance," comes as a relief (to the album itself)." B. Love was positive towards lyrics: "Jimmy Crack Corn," that steals the show though: "you wanna talk shit? Let'em talk shit/cause they talk shit/knowing deep down they just wanna squash it/cause no wants to walk around stepping in dog shit/and get doo doo on their shoe again as soon as they washed it/but their pride won't let'em, inside's like go get'em/and I'm just like why you tryin' to fight momentum/we just keep winnin' by landslides oh and um/Shady Limited in any size yo demin...meanwhile your minds on us like mine's on Mariah/and y'all are just her you're all fuckin' liars/but I'll just keep fucking you like I fucked her/right in the ass with K-Y, yes sir/so full of joy, boy am I absurd/even Chingy would tell you, that boy don't cuurr." Sputnik Music noted that Eminem puts out superb beats for this song. RapReviews called this song "deadly funny duet." Dorian Lynskey wrote that On Jimmy Crack Corn, "he Eminem leeringly revisits his alleged 2001 tryst with Mariah Carey (she denies they were ever involved.)" PopMatters noted that this is one of the only tracks worthy enough to be on your mixtape, "the 50 Cent duo complete with breathy beatbox intro."

== Track listing ==
Digital download

No.	Title	Writer(s)	Producer(s)	Length
1.	"Jimmy Crack Corn" (feat. 50 Cent)	Marshall Mathers; Curtis Jackson; Luis Resto	Eminem; Luis Resto^{[a]}	3:54
2.	"Jimmy Crack Corn" (Cashis Vocal Mix) (feat. Cashis)	Mathers; Jackson; Resto	Eminem; Resto^{[a]}	3:34

12" vinyl

No.	Title	Writer(s)	Producer(s)	Length
1.	"Jimmy Crack Corn" (Cashis Vocal Mix) (Clean)	Marshall Mathers; Curtis Jackson; Luis Resto	Eminem; Luis Resto^{[a]}	3:34
2.	"Jimmy Crack Corn" (Cashis Vocal Mix) (Explicit)	Mathers; Jackson; Resto	Eminem; Resto^{[a]}	3:34
3.	"Jimmy Crack Corn" (Cashis Vocal Mix) (Instrumental)	Mathers; Jackson; Resto	Eminem; Resto^{[a]}	3:34
4.	"Jimmy Crack Corn" (Cashis Vocal Mix) (Acapella)	Mathers; Jackson; Resto	Eminem; Resto^{[a]}	3:34

Promotional CD single

No.	Title	Writer(s)	Producer(s)	Length
1.	"Jimmy Crack Corn" (feat. 50 Cent) (Edited)	Marshall Mathers; Curtis Jackson; Luis Resto	Eminem; Luis Resto^{[a]}	3:46
2.	"Jimmy Crack Corn" (feat. 50 Cent) (Explicit)	Mathers; Jackson; Resto	Eminem; Resto^{[a]}	3:54

Notes

- ^{^[a]} signifies an additional producer.

== Charts ==
Chart (2007)	Peak position
US Bubbling Under Hot 100 Singles (Billboard)	1
US Pop 100 (Billboard)	77
