= Statlanta =

Studio album by Stat Quo
- Released: July 13, 2010
- Recorded: 2003–2010
- Genre: Hip-hop
- Length: 46:07
- Labels: Dream Big; Sony; The Orchard
- Producers: Stat Quo; Sha Money XL; Infinity; Needlz; Che Vicious; Key Kat Productions; Phonix Beats; Boi-1da; Arthur McArthur; Lyr1kz; S1; Caleb McCampbell; Louis Keyz; Mike Chav

Stat Quo chronology
Great Depression (2009)	Statlanta (2010)	ATLA: All This Life Allows, Vol. 1 (2014)

Singles from Statlanta
- 1. "Ghetto USA" Released: December 8, 2009; 2. "Success" Released: May 18, 2010

Statlanta is the debut studio album by Atlanta rapper Stat Quo. First recorded and set to be released in 2003, under Shady Records, Aftermath Entertainment and Interscope Records with mentors Eminem and Dr. Dre as executive producers, it was reworked in seven years not featuring any of the original material recordings, and was released on July 13, 2010, under Sha Money XL's Dream Big Ventures label after many push-backs.

Statlanta debuted at #85 on Billboard's Top R&B/Hip-Hop Albums chart.

== Background ==
In a 2017 interview with HipHopDX, Stat Quo said that Statlanta was not released through Shady/Aftermath due to an argument he had with Eminem over a song called "Dance on It". Eminem had written a chorus for Stat Quo to perform, but Stat Quo did not think it was good and told Eminem that he would only release the song in exchange for a million dollars. He said this made Eminem "mad as shit". While Stat Quo apologized the next day and the two recorded "Syllables" with Jay-Z, Dr. Dre, 50 Cent, and Cashis, their relationship did not recover: "We did that song right after my long apology. I was like, 'Oh, we cool; he put me on a song with Jay-Z.' But no, he was not cool [with me after that]."

== Production and guests ==
Statlanta features production from Sha Money XL, Needlz, S1, Boi-1da, Stat Quo himself, among others. Featured guests include Marsha Ambrosius, Antonio McLendon, Brevi, Esthero, Raheem DeVaughn, Devin the Dude, and Talib Kweli. Former mentor Dr. Dre was involved since the recording process, and served as production consultant-supervisor, he helped Stat Quo along with Aftermath producer Mike Chav to materialize the album.

Two leftover tracks featuring Eminem, titled "Atlanta On Fire" (also known as "The Next One") and "Classic Shit" (also known as "Testify") have been leaked to the internet.

== Singles ==
The first single from the album was "Ghetto USA" featuring Antonio McLendon, who is also Stat Quo's songwriting labelmate on Aftermath Entertainment, which was released on December 8, 2009, via Amazon.com. A Video was released for the single on November 13, 2010.

The second and final single from the album was "Success", which was released on May 18, 2010, via Amazon.com. A video was released for the single on March 2, 2010.

== Track listing ==
No.	Title	Writer(s)	Producer(s)	Length
1.	"The Beginning"	Stanley Benton; Khari Cain; Jason Suecof	Infinity; Needlz	3:13
2.	"Welcome Back" (featuring Marsha Ambrosius)	Benton; Marsha Ambrosius	Che Vicious	4:39
3.	"Ghetto USA" (featuring Antonio McLendon)	Benton; Michael Clervoix; Canei Finch; R. George; Antonio McLendon	Sha Money XL	3:22
4.	"Dedicated"	Benton	Key Kat Productions	3:33
5.	"Success"	Benton; Ernest Vaughn	Phonix Beats	3:37
6.	"Catch Me"	Benton; Jeremy McArthur; Matthew Samuels	Boi-1da; Arthur McArthur	3:38
7.	"Cry" (featuring Brevi)	Benton; Joshua Bocanegra	Lyr1kz	3:40
8.	"Space Ship" (featuring Esthero)	Benton; Jenny-Bea Englishman	Che Vicious	3:42
9.	"Lie to You" (featuring Raheem DeVaughn and Devin the Dude)	Benton; Devin Copeland; Raheem DeVaughn	Che Vicious	4:14
10.	"Alright" (featuring Talib Kweli)	Benton; Talib Kweli; Larry D. Griffin Jr.; Caleb McCampbell	S1; Caleb McCampbell	5:02
11.	"What I Like"	Benton	Stat Quo; Louis Keyz (co.)	3:40
12.	"Penthouse Condo"	Benton; Samuels; Michael Chavarria	Boi-1da; Mike Chav	3:47

== Charts ==
Chart (2010)	Peak position
U.S. Billboard Top R&B/Hip-Hop Albums	85
