= You Don't Know (Eminem song) =

Single by Eminem featuring 50 Cent, Lloyd Banks and Ca$his

from the album Eminem Presents: The Re-Up
- Released: November 5, 2006 (US); December 11, 2006 (UK)
- Recorded: 2005
- Genre: Gangsta rap; hardcore hip hop
- Length: 4:17
- Label: Shady; Interscope
- Songwriters: Marshall Mathers; Curtis Jackson; Christopher Lloyd; Ramone Johnson; Luis Resto
- Producers: Eminem; Luis Resto (add.)

Eminem singles chronology
"Smack That" (2006)	"You Don't Know" (2006)	"Jimmy Crack Corn" (2007)

50 Cent singles chronology
"Creep" (2006)	"You Don't Know" (2006)	"Jimmy Crack Corn" (2007)

Lloyd Banks singles chronology
"Hands Up" (2006)	"You Don't Know" (2006)	"Help" (2006)

Cashis singles chronology
"You Don't Know" (2006)	"Jimmy Crack Corn" (2007)

Music video
- "You Don't Know" on YouTube

"You Don't Know" is a song by American rappers Eminem, 50 Cent, Lloyd Banks and Cashis from the Shady Records compilation album Eminem Presents: The Re-Up (2006). It was released by Shady Records and Interscope Records as the lead single from the album on November 5, 2006. The song was produced by Eminem, with additional production from Luis Resto. "You Don't Know" is a gangsta rap song and lyrically revolves around street loyalty and dominance in hip hop.

"You Don't Know" received generally positive reviews and was a commercial success, peaking at number 12 on the Billboard Hot 100 and eventually being certified Platinum by the Recording Industry Association of America (RIAA). Internationally, it reached the top 10 in Belgium, Ireland and Norway, and also became a top 40 hit in Brazil and the United Kingdom. The song was later included on the compilation album Shady XV (2014), which was released in honor of Shady Records' 15th anniversary.

== Critical reception ==
"You Don't Know" received generally positive reviews from music critics. AllMusic called this song an "excellent all-star single", and was highlighted by the same critic as a standout track from The Re-Up. B. Love was positive: "When Em snatches the mic and takes the lead on songs like the title track, "You Don't Know" (which everyone just rips), he makes a strong case for his claim to be the tightest emcee in the game" and he added: "Em isn't the only one sounding hungry again; Fif is sounding better than he has since his debut. (...) Its batting lead off on the aforementioned posse cut "You Don't Know." RapReviews noted that 2 new rappers Bobby Creekwater and Cashis can be heard in following lyrics: ""Pistol play ricochet, see where the victim lay Slumped over bleeding J.F.K. A.K. 'til your chest plate cave I'll ride to the death, do you rep that way? Forever I'ma be a Shady 7-4 gangsta, Plus I'll survive everything you got in that chamber I thrive off of danger, jumpin in all beef You keep talking shit now the squad called me"

The Guardian thought that Eminem lost creativity but the song was praised: "Eminem's production is barely more inspiring than his talent-spotting. He's been working from the same murky sonic palette since The Marshall Mathers LP: portentous gothic dirges thick with grumbling strings and minor-chord synthesizers. That formula is fiercely potent on You Don't Know, leavened by 50 Cent's sing-song chorus..."

== Music video ==
The video appeared on MTV's Sucker Free, and BET's 106 & Park as a "New Joint", on November 7, 2006. The video reached number 1 on MTV's Total Request Live. Tony Yayo, The Alchemist, Young Buck, D12, Bobby Creekwater, Obie Trice, Mobb Deep, Trick Trick, Dr. Dre & Stat Quo all have cameo appearances. Obie Trice appeared as a helicopter coordinator carrying Lloyd Banks. The video is prison themed with each of the four featured artists portraying highly dangerous criminals. All four are wearing prison outfits and are significantly covered in chains and cuffs, and all four are transported in separate vehicles to a heavily guarded arena. 50 Cent is transported in maximum security prison plane (Boeing C17), Cashis in a train, Lloyd Banks in a helicopter and Eminem is transported in a heavy security transfer truck. The video seems to reference movies such as The Silence of the Lambs with Eminem being restrained in a similar trolley and muzzle to that of Hannibal Lecter's. Eminem also imitates Hannibal Lecter's trademark lip-licking motion to Jodie Foster when, in the beginning of the video, Eminem is visited at his cell by an FBI Agent who looks similar to Foster's character in The Silence of the Lambs. Also, the video references the action film Con Air when Eminem and his fellow prisoners are transported by airplane. This video is also notable for featuring Obie Trice wearing a prototype of Beats by Dr. Dre headphones two years before they were released in 2008.

The music video was uploaded to YouTube in December 2009 and has over 513 million views on the platform as of September 2026.

== Commercial performance ==
"You Don't Know" debuted strongly at number 12 on the Billboard Hot 100 on the chart issue date of December 23, 2006, which at the time made it Eminem's highest singles chart debut in the United States, surpassing "Just Lose It"'s debut of number 17 two years prior in October 2004. "You Don't Know" also became the highest debut for a single on this chart for 50 Cent, Lloyd Banks and Cashis. The song spent a total of six weeks on the Hot 100, and was eventually certified Platinum by the Recording Industry Association of America (RIAA) on February 28, 2018, for exceeding sales of 1 million certified units in the United States.

"You Don't Know" was released in the United Kingdom on December 11, 2006, however, due to the CD release of the single containing a free promotional sticker, it was initially disqualified from entering the UK Singles Chart as British chart rules at the time prohibited singles packaged with promotional stickers from entering. Digital download sales of the song were also ineligible as they could only count if an eligible, physical single was in stores simultaneously. On January 1, 2007, the Official Charts Company changed chart rules and fully integrated downloads into the charts irrespective of any physical formats, which allowed "You Don't Know" to debut at number 32 on January 13, 2007, from download sales alone, making it one of the earliest songs to chart in the United Kingdom without physical sales being counted towards it. In December 2025, "You Don't Know" was certified Gold by the British Phonographic Industry (BPI) for exceeding sales of 400,000 certified units in the United Kingdom.

== Track listing ==
No.	Title	Writer(s)	Producer(s)	Length
1.	"You Don't Know" (performed by Eminem, 50 Cent, Lloyd Banks and Cashis)	Marshall Mathers; Curtis Jackson; Christopher Lloyd; Ramone Johnson; Luis Resto	Eminem; Luis Resto^{[a]}	4:17
2.	"Get Low" (performed by Stat Quo)	Stanley Benton; Andre Young; Dawaun Parker; Mike Elizondo	Dr. Dre; Dawaun Parker^{[a]}	3:19

Notes

- ^{^[a]} signifies an additional producer.

== Charts ==
Chart (2006–2007)	Peak position
Belgium (Ultratip Bubbling Under Flanders)	7
Brazil (ABPD)	15
Ireland (IRMA)	5
Norway (VG-lista)	7
UK Singles (Official Charts)	32
US Billboard Hot 100	12
US Hot R&B/Hip-Hop Songs (Billboard)	87
US Pop 100 (Billboard)	16
US Rhythmic Airplay (Billboard)	40

== Certifications ==
Certifications for "You Don't Know"
Region	Certification	Certified units/sales
Australia (ARIA)	Gold	35,000^{‡}
Brazil (Pro-Música Brasil)	Platinum	60,000^{‡}
Denmark (IFPI Danmark)	Gold	45,000^{‡}
New Zealand (RMNZ)	Platinum	30,000^{‡}
United Kingdom (BPI)	Gold	400,000^{‡}
United States (RIAA)	Platinum	1,000,000^{‡}
^{‡} Sales+streaming figures based on certification alone.

== In popular culture ==
The song is featured in the WWE film The Condemned (2007). This song is also used by the Boston Celtics for their player introductions at the TD Garden.
