= Syllables (song) =

Eminem song featuring Jay-Z, Dr. Dre, 50 Cent, Stat Quo, and Cashis

Song by Eminem featuring Jay-Z, Dr. Dre, 50 Cent, Stat Quo, and Cashis
- Released: December 28, 2010 (leak); January 2011 (radio)
- Label: Shady; Aftermath; Interscope

"Syllables" is a song by American rapper Eminem featuring American rappers Jay-Z, Dr. Dre, 50 Cent, Stat Quo, and Cashis. A tongue-in-cheek critique of the decline of lyricism in hip-hop, it was leaked online on December 28, 2010, and was released to US urban radio in January 2011. According to Cashis, it was recorded c. late 2007, although the chorus was changed at some point after the original recording sessions. It is unclear whether the song was produced by Dr. Dre, Eminem, or both.

== Background ==
Eminem, Dr. Dre, and 50 Cent have a long history of collaboration: Dr. Dre signed Eminem to his Interscope imprint Aftermath Entertainment in 1998, and the two signed 50 Cent in a joint deal between Aftermath and Eminem's own imprint, Shady Records, in 2002. Like 50 Cent, Stat Quo was signed to both Shady and Aftermath, and he has said that "Syllables" was recorded a day after he and Eminem had an argument that ultimately led to his debut album not being released by the labels. Cashis was also signed to Shady.

Eminem and Jay-Z had previously collaborated on the song "Renegade" in 2001, and the two toured together in 2010. Dr. Dre had worked with Jay-Z various times in the past, as had 50 Cent, despite the two feuding at times.

== Leak and production ==
"Syllables" was leaked online on December 28, 2010, hours after it was teased on Twitter by DJ Big Mike. In his tweet, he described it as a Dr. Dre–produced Eminem song featuring Jay-Z, Dr. Dre, and 50 Cent; Stat Quo and Cashis's verses were only revealed when the song leaked. DJ Big Mike did not say who was responsible for the leak. Several other unreleased Eminem songs surfaced that week.

In the days following its leak, "Syllables" was variously described by the media as an Eminem song, as a Dr. Dre song, or simply as a collaboration between all, with no primary artist specified. There was some speculation that it was intended for Dr. Dre's album Detox, which at the time was expected to be released in February 2011 but has since been canceled. The song was sent to US urban radio by Shady, Aftermath, and Interscope in January 2011, with Eminem listed as the primary artist.

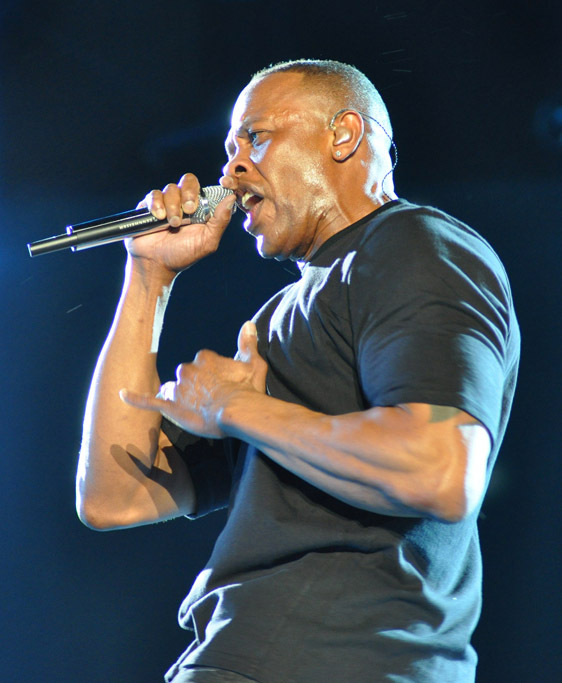
Dr. Dre

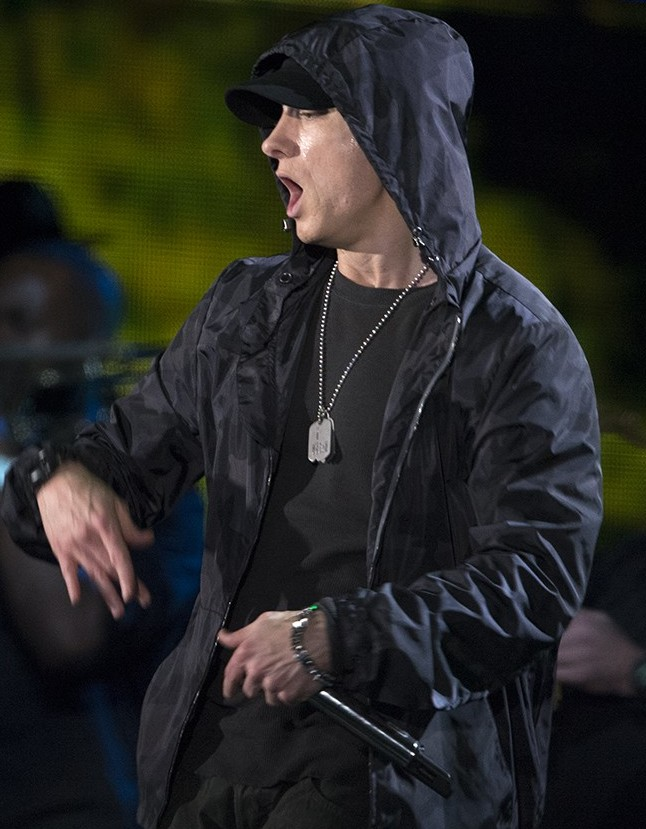
Eminem

According to Cashis, "Syllables" was intended for Dr. Dre's Detox or an Eminem album.

In an interview with Vibe magazine the day after the leak, Cashis said that the song was recorded c. late 2007 and that he believed it was intended for an Eminem album or Detox. Cashis recalled recording his part in Dr. Dre's studio alongside Eminem, 50 Cent, and Stat Quo, with Jay-Z having just left the session. He also said that the leaked version had a different chorus than the one he was familiar with from the original recording, which "went something like 'Happy Birthday...'"; he could not remember whether the song was produced by Dr. Dre, Eminem, or both; and he was not sure whether or not it was leaked with the label's approval.

== Composition ==
Instrumentally, "Syllables" features piano and what Exclaim! describes as "firecracker snares". Thematically, it is a tongue-in-cheek critique of hip-hop's lyrical decline, targeted at fans who show little regard for lyrics.

Eminem begins the song. Using a sped-up voice and sounding like his alter ego, Slim Shady, he says: "It is not about lyrics anymore. It's about a hot beat and a catchy hook." His verse, performed in an accent for comedic effect, criticizes the aforementioned fans and the formulaic structure of popular songs. Eminem is followed by Jay-Z, who is in turn followed by Dr. Dre. Dr. Dre similarly criticizes the state of hip-hop and additionally teases the release of Detox.

The song then transitions into an R&B chorus sung by Eminem. Meant to reinforce the song's theme, it is deliberately cliché and features lyrics such as "Shorty I love you / And you love me too", with AllHipHop characterizing it as a "mock chorus". It is followed by 50 Cent and Stat Quo's verses, with the final verse performed by Cashis.

== Critical reception ==
Mikey Fresh of Vibe magazine described the leak as "monumental". He wrote that even though music leaks were common in hip-hop at the time, "Syllables" caused "web surfers [to] literally [stop] in their tracks to listen", given that it was a posse cut featuring such a prominent lineup. Latifah Muhammad of The Boombox wrote that each rapper's performance was "as colossal as the guest list itself", while D.L. Chandler and Rahman Dukes of MTV News noted that there was a "compelling argument" to be had over who was the standout performer between Eminem, Jay-Z, Dr. Dre, and 50 Cent.

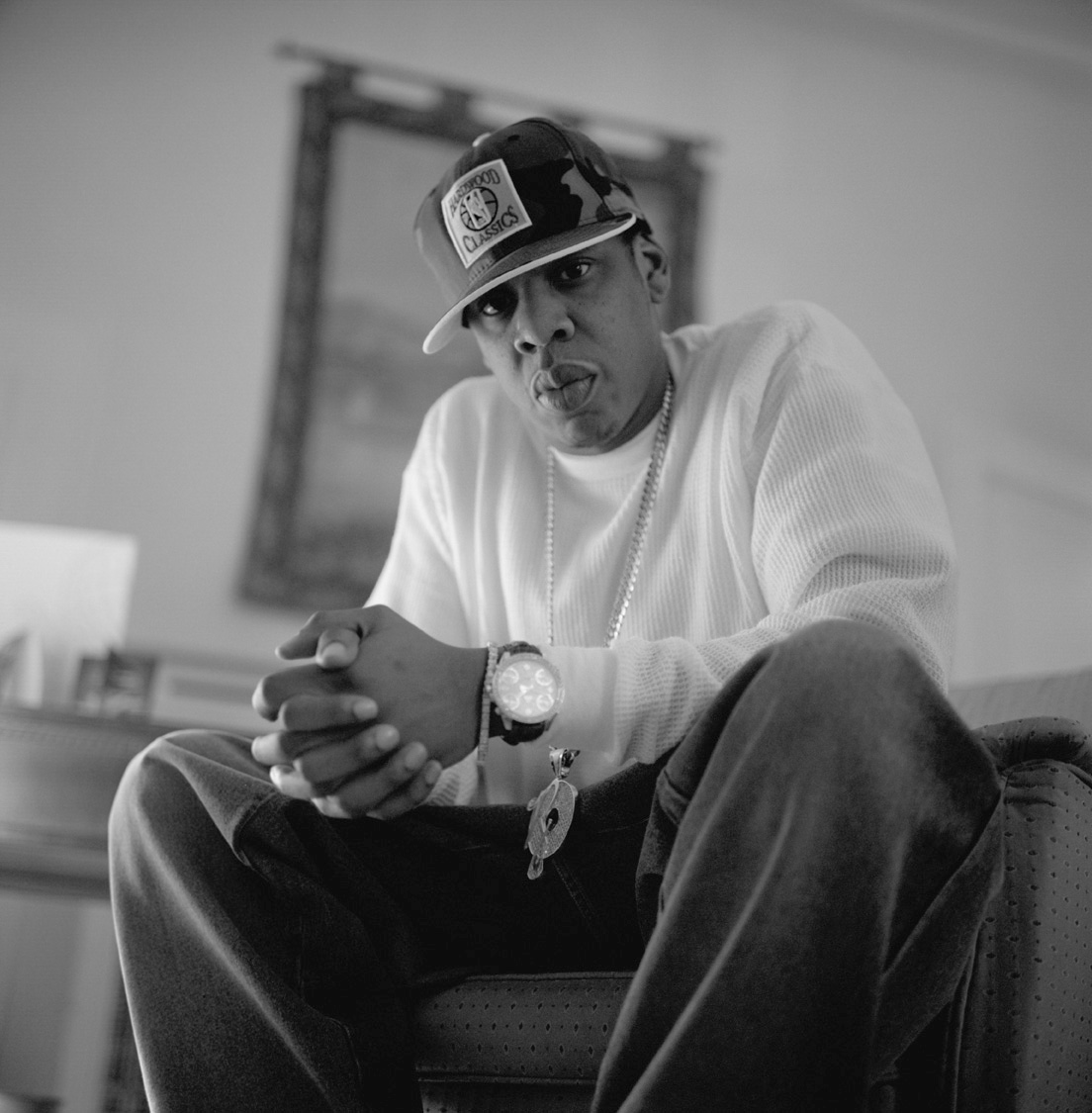
Jay-Z

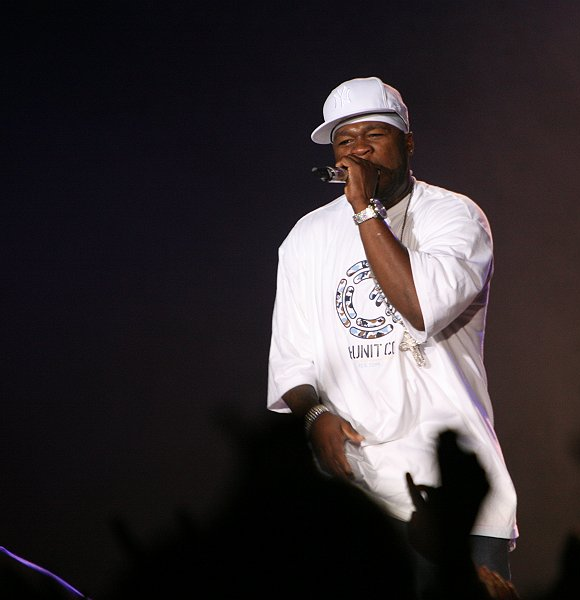
50 Cent

Vulture welcomed the fact that Jay-Z and 50 Cent appeared on the same song, citing their history of on-and-off tensions.

Vulture wrote that the best thing about the song was that it was likely recorded years earlier, likening it to a "time capsule" from a time when Jay-Z sounded "bold and commanding", while finding Eminem "scrappy" and "intentionally funny", without the "over-rapping" he had displayed on songs like "Forever" (2009). Vulture also welcomed the collaboration between Jay-Z and 50 Cent, given their history of on-and-off tensions. However, the publication called the song unfinished and noted that its excitement was not necessarily based on its quality, but more so on following the development of the "mythical" Detox.

Dave Bry of The Awl said he enjoyed the song and complimented Jay-Z's verse, but he disliked the chorus and was not sure whether it was intentionally bad, as a "subversive statement about pop hooks", or simply unfinished. He remarked that the chorus felt disconnected from the verses, comparing it in that regard to Eminem's 2010 single "Love the Way You Lie". Josiah Hughes of Exclaim! found it ironic that "Syllables", which he described as taking aim at "pop-obsessed listeners", surfaced following the commercial success of "Love the Way You Lie". Nonetheless, he felt that its high-profile lineup made it worth a listen.

In 2013, HotNewHipHop included "Syllables" on its unranked list of "50 Crazy Eminem Verses", with Perry Simpson writing:

It's no surprise that a song lamenting the lost art of lyricism features some incredibly technical raps from Eminem, and everyone else on the track. His is not the longest verse, but it is arguably the strongest and most direct. Plus the satirical hook is hilarious.
