= The County Hound 3 =

Studio album by Ca$his
- Released: April 7, 2015
- Recorded: 2014–2015
- Genre: Hip hop; gangsta rap
- Length: 53:22
- Label: Bogish Brand Entertainment
- Producer: Rikanatti; Cin-A-Matik; Eminem; The Coalition; The Punisher; J Speck; Johnny & Nate; 909 Cartel; Lil' Lyss

Ca$his chronology
| Bogish Boy, Vol. 1 (2014) | The County Hound 3 (2015) | Euthanasia 2 (2015) |

Singles from The County Hound 2
- 1. "A-Rod" Released: December 16, 2014; 2. "Work" Released: January 6, 2015; 3. "Turn Up" Released: April 21, 2015; 4. "I'ma Ride G Mix" Released: April 28, 2015; 5. "Kingpin" Released: May 12, 2015; 6. "Defy Odds" Released: May 26, 2015

The County Hound 3 is the fourth studio album by American rapper Cashis. The album was released on April 7, 2015 by his label Bogish Brand Entertainment. The album features guest appearances from Young Buck, Arez Cobain, Project Pat, Problem, Roscoe, Emilio Rojas among others. Rikanatti handles a majority of the production on the project.

== Track listing ==
| No. | Title | Producer(s) | Length |
|---|---|---|---|
| 1. | "CH3 Intro" | Rikanatti | 1:09 |
| 2. | "Let Me Be" | Rikanatti; Cin-A-Matik | 3:40 |
| 3. | "Turn Up" | Rikanatti | 3:28 |
| 4. | "Kingpin" (featuring Young Buck, Arez Cobain and June B) | The Coalition; Rikanatti | 4:00 |
| 5. | "Thug Boy" | Eminem | 3:24 |
| 6. | "Work" (featuring Young Buck, Project Pat and Sullee J) | Rikanatti; The Punisher | 4:56 |
| 7. | "Come 2 tha Hood" | Rikanatti; J Speck | 3:07 |
| 8. | "Live That Life" | Rikanatti; Johnny & Nate | 3:50 |
| 9. | "You Ain't the Homie" | Rikanatti | 4:18 |
| 10. | "Itz Nothin G Mix" (featuring Beeda Weeda) | 909 Cartel | 2:49 |
| 11. | "I'ma Ride G Mix" (featuring Problem, Roscoe, Mac Lucci, Vibe, Britizen Kane, R Land and Big Doty) | Rikanatti | 7:52 |
| 12. | "Defy Odds" | Rikanatti | 3:01 |
| 13. | "Certified Hustla" (featuring Sara Shine) | Rikanatti; The Punisher | 3:19 |
| 14. | "A-Rod" (featuring Emilio Rojas) | Rikanatti; Lil' Lyss | 4:29 |
| Total length: | | | 53:22 |

== See also ==
- The County Hound EP
- The County Hound 2
