= The County Hound 2 =

Studio album by Ca$his
- Released: October 15, 2013
- Recorded: 2006–2013
- Genres: Hip hop; gangsta rap
- Length: 66:14
- Label: Bogish Brand Entertainment
- Producers: Cashis (exec.); Rikanatti (also exec.); Cin-A-Matik; Eminem; The Punisher; Lil' Lyss; R&D; 1Down; Steve E

Ca$his chronology
The Art of Dying (2012)	The County Hound 2 (2013)	Euthanasia (2014)

Singles from The County Hound 2
- 1. "Layin' in the Cut" Released: April 30, 2013; 2. "Mind on Money" Released: May 14, 2013; 3. "Imma Hustla" Released: July 1, 2013; 4. "Look at Me" Released: August 19, 2013; 5. "Hi" Released: August 21, 2013; 6. "Take the Pain" Released: June 17, 2014; 7. "Bright Lights" Released: July 1, 2014; 8. "Red" Released: July 29, 2014

The County Hound 2 is the second studio album by American rapper Cashis, who also served as executive producer. It was released independently on October 15, 2013, by his label Bogish Brand Entertainment. It serves as the sequel to his debut EP The County Hound EP, which was released on May 22, 2007 by Shady Records and Interscope Records. The album features guest appearances by Crooked I from Slaughterhouse, Obie Trice, Mistah F.A.B., Kuniva from D12, King Los, K. Young, Boaz, and Demrick among others. Production for the album took place from 2006 to 2013, and was handled primarily by Rikanatti and Eminem among others. The album was supported by eight singles — "Layin' in the Cut", "Mind on Money", "Imma Hustla", "Look at Me", "Hi", "Take the Pain", "Bright Lights" and "Red". It was also met with positive reviews from music critics.

== Background ==
Just prior to the release of his debut album The Art of Dying, Cashis revealed he had already begun to work on his second studio album Euthanasia, which he claimed was 65% done in September 2012. He also revealed that it would feature production from Jake One and Eminem, also while projecting a May 2013 release for the project. Upon the release of the first single in May 2013, the album was renamed The County Hound 2.

On September 28, 2013, Cashis revealed the cover art and track list to the album, also announcing a release date of October 15, 2013. He also revealed previously unannounced guest appearances on the album to come from Boaz, and Demrick among others, with the album's production to be primarily handled by him and his frequent collaborator Rikanatti (who they both executive produce and handle the A&R Direction for the album), with Eminem also producing significantly on the album. In total, Eminem produced four tracks, such as the first single "Layin' in the Cut", and three more songs, such as "Thru the Glass", "Ask About Me" and "Cigarello".

== Release and promotion ==
On December 25, 2012, Cashis released the first mixtape in promotion of the album titled Loose Cannon, which was previously going to be the title of his third studio album.

In July 2013, Cashis announced that he was also working on his next mixtape The Loose Cannon 2, which would contain mostly freestyles. On October 14, 2013, Cashis released the Eminem-produced song "Cigarello" via SoundCloud. The album was released digitally on October 15, 2013, with physical copies to be released two weeks later. It was also released for free stream on its digital release day for a limited time.

On October 31, 2013, Cashis announced that he would be releasing a high quantity of music videos for songs from the album soon. Following the album's release, Cashis and Demrick toured through the rest of 2013.

== Singles ==
On April 30, 2013, Cashis released the first single from his newly titled second studio album The County Hound 2, titled "Layin in the Cut" which was produced by Eminem and Rikanatti. The music video for "Layin' in the Cut" was released on August 8, 2013, which also featured a preview of the music video for "Look at Me". The second single from the album titled, "Mind on Money" was released to iTunes on May 16, 2013. The song features rappers Kuniva from D12, Obie Trice and Dirty Mouth. On June 21, 2013, Cashis released a music video for his verse on "Mind on Money", also previewing the album's third single "Imma Hustla".

On July 1, 2013, Cashis released "Imma Hustla" featuring Crooked I from Slaughterhouse and Sullee J, for digital download as the album's third single. On September 30, 2013, Cashis released the remix to "Imma Hustla" featuring Crooked I, Mistah F.A.B., Roccett and Goldie Gold. Then on August 19, 2013 he released the fourth single from The Country Hound 2, entitled "Look at Me" featuring King Los, K Young and B. Todd. Two days later, Cashis premiered the track "Hi" from the album. Later that day, it was released to iTunes as the album's fifth single.

== Critical reception ==
Professional ratings
Review scores
Source	Rating
HipHopDX	3/5 stars

The County Hound 2 was met with generally positive reviews from music critics. Omar Burgess of HipHopDX gave it a positive review saying, "Ultimately, The County Hound 2 serves as a welcome return for loyal Ca$his fans. Name recognition from his Shady days, production from Eminem and some of the lighter singles will likely draw in newcomers. Repeated listens offer a bottom-heavy album; the first half of which both informs and sometimes detracts from the latter portion with trite subject matter. But there’s enough raw talent here to impress a diverse cross section of fans, and when Ca$his chooses depth over accessibility he’s still scary good in the booth."

== Track listing ==
No.	Title	Producer(s)	Length
1.	"Red"	Rikanatti	4:30
2.	"Mind on Money" (featuring Kuniva, Obie Trice and Dirty Mouth)	Rikanatti; Cin-A-Matik	4:59
3.	"Bright Lights" (featuring Boaz)	Rikanatti; The Punisher	2:48
4.	"Look at Me" (featuring King Los, K. Young and B. Todd)	Rikanatti; 1Down	4:14
5.	"Hay"	Rikanatti	3:47
6.	"I Just Wanna" (featuring Kobe)	Rikanatti	4:23
7.	"Imma Hustla (W.C. Remix)" (featuring Mistah F.A.B., Roccett, Crooked I and Goldie Gold)	Rikanatti; Lil' Lyss	5:16
8.	"The Pain" (featuring Demrick and Sara Shine)	Rikanatti	4:04
9.	"Hi"	Rikanatti; R&D	3:22
10.	"Layin' in the Cut"	Eminem; Rikanatti	3:44
11.	"Serenade My Life"	Rikanatti	5:00
12.	"Dark Nights"	Steve E	4:12
13.	"Thru the Glass"	Eminem; Rikanatti	4:56
14.	"Ask About Me"	Eminem	3:31
15.	"Cigarello"	Eminem; Rikanatti	3:03
16.	"Imma Hustla" (Bonus Track) (featuring Crooked I and Sullee J)	Rikanatti; Lil' Lyss	4:25

== See also ==
- The County Hound EP
