= I Died for This!? =

Studio album by Grip
- Released: August 27, 2021
- Genre: Hip-hop
- Length: 57:43
- Label: Stray Society; Shady; Interscope
- Producer: Grip; TU!; DJ Khalil; Christo; Jay Card; Nice Rec; Beat Butcha; Willy Will Yanez; Oliver Blue; MTK; Eminem; Tedd Boyd; Rahki; Latrell James

Grip chronology
Snubnose (2019)	I Died for This!? (2021)	5 & a F*** You (2022)

Singles from I Died for This!?
- 1. "Gutter!" Released: July 2, 2021

I Died for This!? is the third studio album by American rapper Grip. It was released on August 27, 2021, through Stray Society, Shady Records and Interscope Records. The album features guest appearances from Wiley from Atlanta, Royce Da 5'9, Wara, Dead Cassettes, Eminem, Tate228, Big Rube, Ahyes, Kay Nellz and Kenny Mason and features production from DJ Khalil, Beat Butcha and Rahki, amongst others. It was preceded by one single.

== Reception ==
I Died for This?! ratings
Review scores
Source	Rating
Beats Per Minute	81/100
HipHopDX	3.6/5
Pitchfork	6.8/10

HotNewHipHop's Joshua Robinson called I Died for This!? "a top-tier rap album" and "undoubtedly an album that only a seasoned and skillful rapper could put together". Beats Per Minute's Chase McMullen said that "as his first major statement, [the album] couldn't imply more promise." Pitchfork's Dylan Green called the album "a gritty showcase for [Grip's] creativity and versatility, even if it only works in fits and starts", and said that his "versatility and hunger helps Grip fit right into the label that signed Griselda and Westside Boogie."

== Track listing ==
I Died for This!? track listing
No.	Title	Writer(s)	Producer(s)	Length
1.	"Enter Stage Right"	Kyle Clow; Victor Ekpo	Grip	1:07
2.	"And the Eulogy Read?!" (featuring Wiley from Atlanta)	Clow; Neal H. Pogue II; William Bryant; Johan Lenox; Ivano Milo	TU!	3:40
3.	"Hands Up!"	Clow; Pogue; Khalil Abdul-Rahman	TU!; DJ Khalil	3:13
4.	"IDFT!?"	Clow; Jay Card; Peter Mudge; John Welch	Christo; Jay Card; Nice Rec	2:35
5.	"Momma Told Me!"	Clow; Pogue; Eliot Dubock	TU!; Beat Butcha	3:42
6.	"Placebo" (featuring Royce da 5'9")	Clow; Ryan Montgomery; Pogue; Dubock	TU!; Beat Butcha; Willy Will Yanez	4:05
7.	"Gutter!" (featuring Wara)	Clow; Pogue; Jawara Kenyatte Barnett	TU!	2:54
8.	"JDDTTINT!?" (featuring Dead Cassettes)	Clow; Pogue; Abdul-Rahman; Milo; B. Scott	TU!; DJ Khalil; Oliver Blue	3:21
9.	"A Soldier's Story?"	Clow; Dubock	Beat Butcha; Willy Will Yanez	3:04
10.	"Walkthrough!" (featuring Eminem)	Clow; Marshall Mathers; Pogue; Matthew Crabtree	TU!; MTK; Eminem	3:28
11.	"The Lox!" (featuring Tate228)	Clow; Pogue; Alfred Tate; Abdul-Rahman; Tedd Boyd	TU!; DJ Khalil; Tedd Boyd	4:15
12.	"Enem3?" (featuring Big Rube)	Clow; Pogue; Ruben Bailey	TU!	3:37
13.	"ConMan?" (featuring Ahyes)	Clow; Pogue; Dubock	TU!; Beat Butcha	3:43
14.	"Glenwood Freestyle!"	Clow; Columbus Smith III	Rahki	2:50
15.	"At What Cost?"	Clow; Pogue; Latrell James; Shellie Robinson	Latrell James	3:08
16.	"Patterns?"	Clow; Dubock	Beat Butcha; Willy Will Yanez	4:24
17.	"Pennies... Exit Stage Left!?" (featuring Kay Nellz and Kenny Mason)	Clow; Pogue; Kernell Hunt; Edwin Green Jr.; Milo	TU!	4:26
Total length:				57:43

== Personnel ==
- Grip – vocals (all tracks)
- Wiley from Atlanta – vocals (track 2)
- Royce da 5'9" – vocals (track 6)
- Dead Cassettes – vocals (track 8)
- Eminem – vocals (track 10)
- Tate228 – vocals (track 11)
- Big Rube – vocals (track 12)
- Ahyes – vocals (track 13)
- Kay Nellz – vocals (track 17)
- Kenny Mason – vocals (track 17)
