= Grip (rapper) =

American rapper

- Born: Kyle Thomas Clow; East Atlanta, Georgia, U.S.
- Genres: Hip-hop
- Occupations: Rapper; songwriter
- Years active: 2017–present
- Labels: Stray Society; Shady; Interscope

Kyle Thomas Clow, known professionally as Grip, is an American rapper from Eastside Atlanta, Georgia. He signed with Eminem's Shady Records in 2021, an imprint of Interscope Records. That same year, he released his major-label debut album, I Died for This!?, which features guest appearances from Eminem, Royce da 5'9", and Kenny Mason, among others.

== Early life and background ==
Grip was born and raised in East Atlanta, Georgia, and later moved to Decatur. In interviews, he has described his upbringing as modest, with early experiences that shaped both his worldview and artistic direction. He began writing lyrics at a young age, drawing inspiration from Southern hip-hop acts such as Outkast and T.I., as well as lyricists like Nas. T.I.'s album Trap Muzik in particular made him believe that success in rap was attainable.

Grip has said that music became an outlet early on, and that he used writing to reflect on personal experiences and his environment. In a 2021 interview with Beats Per Minute, he explained that storytelling and cinematic imagery were part of his approach from the start, noting that he was influenced not only by rappers but by visual culture and film.

== Career ==
Grip began building his reputation in the late 2010s with self-released projects that showcased his narrative-driven style rooted in East Atlanta. His debut album, Porch (2017), and follow-up Snubnose (2019) received critical acclaim. During this period, he supported himself by working various jobs, including as a cab driver, and was forced to cancel his first planned national tour in 2020 due to the COVID‑19 pandemic.

In late 2019, Grip joined rapper JID on a European tour, which he credited with significantly improving his live performance skills.

In July 2021, Eminem, via Shady Records co-founder Paul Rosenberg, took notice of Snubnose and praised its conceptual depth, calling it "really refreshing". After a meeting with Eminem, Grip signed to Shady Records in July 2021, with Eminem assuring him he would retain creative control over his work.

Grip released his major-label debut album, I Died for This!?, on August 27, 2021, under Shady Records and Interscope Records. The project features guest appearances from Eminem, Royce da 5'9", Kenny Mason, Wara, and Big Rube, with production from TU!, Beat Butcha, Rahki, DJ Khalil, and others.

The album was praised for its conceptual ambition, lyrical density, and moody production. Pitchfork called it "bold and ambitious", highlighting tracks like "A Soldier's Story?" for their emotional honesty and thematic coherence. HotNewHipHop also commended the album's storytelling and introspective tone, though some critics noted the length and pacing as drawbacks.

In interviews, Grip stated that he approached the album with a cinematic mindset, drawing inspiration from films such as No Country for Old Men, and described "Walkthrough!"—his collaboration with Eminem—as a centerpiece that he specifically designed to suit Eminem's style. He also recalled Eminem encouraging him to remain authentic and not to force creativity.

Despite the album's positive reception, some fans and commentators expressed concern over a perceived lack of promotional support from Shady Records. Reddit discussions featured remarks such as, "I love Grip, nobody ever talks about him though…it's crazy," and, "Grip is great…very, very under-appreciated because of Shady Records' allergy to artist promotion".

In 2022, Grip released the follow-up EP 5 & a F*** You, continuing his exploration of industry themes and personal growth while maintaining the raw lyrical style that earned him critical attention.

== Artistry ==
Grip's music is known for its introspective lyricism, conceptual storytelling, and Southern hip-hop influence. He frequently blends traditional boom bap with darker, cinematic production, often exploring themes of self-doubt, ambition, trauma, and survival. Critics have described his work as both emotionally raw and intellectually layered.

In a 2021 interview with Beats Per Minute, Grip explained that he approaches projects with a cinematic mindset, aiming to build immersive, cohesive worlds across an album's runtime. He cited No Country for Old Men as a film that influenced the structure and tone of his 2021 album, I Died for This!?. According to Grip, each track is intended to feel like a scene within a larger narrative arc.

His musical influences include Southern artists such as T.I. and Outkast, as well as East Coast lyricists like Nas. Grip has emphasized his desire to balance technical proficiency with emotional resonance, stating that he aims to "make you think and make you feel at the same time".

== Reception ==
Grip's major-label debut, I Died for This!? (2021), received positive reviews from critics. Pitchfork described the album as "bold and ambitious", highlighting its dense lyricism and conceptual ambition, particularly praising tracks like "A Soldier's Story?" for exploring the anxiety of waiting for a breakthrough.

HotNewHipHop noted the project's strong narrative structure and introspective tone, writing that Grip "manages to balance raw emotion with technical prowess", and commending his ability to "paint vivid pictures with a grounded perspective".

Though critical response was generally favorable, some reviews and listeners pointed to the album's 17-track runtime and sequencing as drawbacks, with Pitchfork suggesting that the momentum occasionally faltered.

On fan-driven platforms like Reddit, Grip has been praised as "underrated" and "slept on", with multiple users expressing frustration over what they perceive as limited promotion by Shady Records.

== Public image ==
Grip has often been described in interviews and reviews as an underappreciated artist in mainstream hip hop. Despite signing with Shady Records in 2021 and earning critical acclaim, he has spoken about feeling "under the radar" and acknowledged that his refusal to follow trends may limit his commercial reach.

In a 2021 interview with Beats Per Minute, he stated: "If it don't feel right, I'm not doing it," reinforcing his reputation for artistic integrity.

Critics have described his public image as grounded and introspective, shaped by his focus on personal storytelling rather than mainstream appeal.

== Tours ==
In late 2019, Grip joined fellow Atlanta rapper JID as an opening act on the Catch Me If You Can Tour in Europe. The tour included stops in major cities such as Paris, London, Berlin, and Amsterdam. Grip later credited the tour with significantly improving his stage presence and giving him his first exposure to international audiences.

As of 2025, Grip has not yet headlined a major tour of his own, but he has continued to perform at club venues and select festivals in the U.S. following the release of I Died for This!?.

== Collaborations and features ==
Grip's most high-profile collaboration to date is with Eminem on the track "Walkthrough!", featured on his 2021 major-label debut I Died for This!?. In interviews, he revealed that he crafted the song specifically to fit Eminem's style and considered it a centerpiece of the project.

The album also features appearances from Royce da 5'9", Kenny Mason, Wara, and Big Rube, showcasing Grip's connections across both established and underground circles.

Earlier in his career, Grip toured with Dreamville's JID and has cited artistic admiration for acts like EarthGang, though no official studio collaborations with them have been released as of 2025.

Grip's work is often noted for blending Southern sensibilities with East Coast lyricism, leading critics to compare him stylistically to artists such as Mick Jenkins and Denzel Curry.

== Discography ==
=== Studio albums ===
- Porch (2017)
- Snubnose (2019)
- I Died for This!? (2021)

=== Extended plays ===
- Halo (2020)
- Proboscidea (2020)

=== Mixtapes ===
- 5 & a F**k You (2022)
- STILL (Five & A F*** You) (2023)
