= ATLA: All This Life Allows, Vol. 1 =

Studio album by Stat Quo
- Released: February 25, 2014
- Recorded: 2013
- Genre: Hip hop
- Length: 54:07
- Label: ATLA Music
- Producers: DeUno (exec.); Amir Perry; Bink; Steve Esterfern; LT Moe; Dr. Dre; A.O.; Ty Cutta; Tone Mason

Stat Quo chronology
Statlanta (2010)	ATLA: All This Life Allows, Vol. 1 (2014)

Singles from ATLA: All This Life Allows, Vol. 1
- 1. "Michael" Released: September 9, 2013; 2. "Trillion" Released: December 16, 2013; 3. "OutKast" Released: December 21, 2013; 4. "That's Life, Pt. 1" Released: January 6, 2014

ATLA: All This Life Allows, Vol. 1 is the second studio album by American rapper Stat Quo. The album was released on February 25, 2014, under his independent label ATLA Music. It was preceded by Stat Quo's first studio album Statlanta (2010). The album's production was handled by DeUno, Amir Perry, A.O., Steve Esterfern, Ty Cutta, Bink, LT Moe, Tone Mason and Dr. Dre. It also features guest appearances from Stoney Brown, Sha Sha, Dre (of Cool & Dre), Scarface and Devin the Dude. The album was promoted by four singles: "Michael", "Trillion" featuring Dre, "OutKast" and "That's Life, Pt. 1".

== Singles ==
On September 9, 2013, Stat Quo released the first single "Michael" (a tribute to Michael Jordan, Mike Tyson, & Michael Jackson) and confirmed it to appears as a bonus track. It was produced by Tone Mason.

On December 16, 2013, the second single titled "Trillion" was released. It features Dre from production duo Cool & Dre and was produced by Tone Mason who also produced "Michael", the album's lead single.

On December 20, 2013, "OutKast" was released as the third single. The song was produced by DeUno and pays homage to Atlanta rap group Outkast.

Stat Quo released the album opener "That's Life, Pt. 1" as the album's fourth single on January 6, 2014. The single was produced by Bink.

== Track listing ==
No.	Title	Producer(s)	Length
1.	"That's Life, Pt. 1"	Bink	3:22
2.	"My Niggas" / "Live Fast" (featuring Stoney Brown)	"My Niggas" produced by DeUno; "Live Fast" produced by D.K.	6:42
3.	"OutKast" / "Relax"	"OutKast" produced by DeUno; "Relax" produced by A.O.	5:47
4.	"Living to Get High"	Ty Cutta	3:47
5.	"Feel It"	DeUno	4:22
6.	"4 Wheel Dreamin" / "Late Night" (featuring Sha Sha)	"4 Wheel Dreamin" produced by DeUno; "Late Night" produced by Amir Perry	5:35
7.	"The Way It Be" (featuring Scarface)	Steve Esterferm; Dr. Dre	4:16
8.	"Trillion" (featuring Dre)	Tone Mason	3:34
9.	"Guilty"	Amir Perry	3:57
10.	"Michael"	Tone Mason	4:49
11.	"Pussy" (featuring Devin the Dude)	LT Moe	4:46
12.	"That's Life, Pt. 2"	Bink	3:10
