= Bobby Creekwater =

American rapper (born 1982)

- Also known as: Bobby Creek; B.C.; Creek
- Born: Antoine Raimon Rogers; November 20, 1982 (age 43)
- Origin: Atlanta, Georgia, U.S.
- Genres: Hip hop
- Occupations: Rapper; songwriter
- Years active: 2003–present
- Labels: BGOV; Shady; Interscope

Antoine Raimon Rogers, better known by his stage name Bobby Creekwater, is an American rapper from Atlanta who is a former member of Shady Records.

== Biography ==
Creekwater was born and raised in various parts of Atlanta, Georgia, and its surrounding area. He attended Clark Atlanta University for one year before leaving to pursue his music career. He and Charlie Jangles formed the hip-hop duo Jatis, which was signed to Columbia Records and then Loud Records, but Loud was shut down before Jatis could release an album.

As an unsigned artist in 2004, Creekwater appeared with Aasim on the song "Anyway", from P-Money's album Magic City. Creekwater was noticed by Shady Records when label executives heard him rapping on a demo by Aasim. Shady Records president Eminem was more interested in Creekwater than Aasim and, in mid-2005, signed him to his label.

In late 2005, Creekwater released a mixtape, Anthem to the Streets. Newsweek described the recording in positive terms, saying it "delivers drug-peddling tales over the cheeriest possible dance tracks. Sesame Street sings crack rap."

In March 2006, he was one of the celebrity panelists at the Detroit Hip-Hop Summit on Financial Empowerment.

On December 5, 2006, Eminem released Eminem Presents the Re-Up, a mixtape-turned-album created to promote Shady Records' newest members: Stat Quo, Creekwater, and Cashis. Creekwater appears on five tracks, including remixes of Eminem and Nate Dogg's "Shake That" and Eminem and Akon's "Smack That". The album received mixed reviews. The Los Angeles Times wrote that Creekwater "sounds like a demonic André 3000", and the New York Daily News said he "has a deep tone and a smooth enough flow, revealed best on the jazz-funk 'There He Is'." The Sunday Mercury wrote that Creekwater is "easily the best of the three" new signings.

In 2007 he released two mixtapes, Anthem 2 Da Streetz II and Back to Briefcase. The Washington Post's critic, in writing about the single "Acid Reign", said Creekwater "threatens to usurp T.I.'s throne as King of the South with effortless rhymes and slow-burning brio."

He is currently working on his debut album, A Brilliant Mistake. The album's executive producer is Eminem. Tracks will be produced by Mr. Porter, The Alchemist, and Don Cannon.

In May 2009, Bobby Creekwater released his second EP in six months. The B.C. Era Deuce EP, the follow-up to the BC Era EP, was initially scheduled for a limited edition physical release on March 4, but was pushed back to March 18 and then to May 1 so that more features could be added. It was released via Creekwater's imprint, BGOV, Inc., and contained a collection of eleven new tracks, featuring production by Creekwater, as well.

He left Shady Records in 2009. His song, "The Day I Got Dropped," clarified the situation, explaining that he did not get dropped by the label.

In 2014, Creekwater released his mixtape I Am From A Place.

== Influences ==
Creekwater is heavily influenced by fellow Atlanta group OutKast and has stated that he believes OutKast-member André 3000 to be the greatest emcee of all time. In April 2010, Creekwater released, "Da Art of Storytellin' Pt.5" in tribute to the group.

== Discography ==
=== Studio albums ===
- Revenge (2011)
- FUPM Is the Future (with Stat Quo as FUPM) (2013)

=== Mixtapes ===
- Anthem 2 da Streets (2005)
- Anthem 2 da Streets II (2007)
- Back to Briefcase (2007)
- Back to Briefcase II (2010)
- Back to Briefcase II (B-Sides) (2010)
- Not Now But Right Now (2010)
- Prevenge (2011)
- 2 (as Lord Wolfgang) (2013)
- I Am from a Place (2014)
- Everywhere at Once (2017)
- SCM Radio, Vol. 1 (2020) (with Fungshway & King Walt)

=== Extended plays ===
- The B.C. Era?... (2008)
- The B.C. Era Deuce EP (May 1, 2009)
- The Day It All Made Sense (September 4, 2009)
- Classic Creek Leaks Vol. 1 (2010)
- Imperial Radio (2018)

=== Compilation appearances ===
2006

- Eminem Presents: The Re-Up (2006, Shady Records, Interscope Records)
  - "We're Back" (Eminem, Obie Trice, Stat Quo, Bobby Creekwater & Cashis)
  - "There He Is"
  - "Smack That" (Remix) (Akon featuring Stat Quo & Bobby Creekwater)
  - "Shake That" (Remix) (Eminem featuring Nate Dogg, Obie Trice & Bobby Creekwater)
  - "Cry Now" (Shady Remix) (Obie Trice featuring Kuniva, Stat Quo, Bobby Creekwater & Cashis)
- Chemistry Files Vol.1 (2006, The Alchemist, ALC Records)
  - "All I Do"

2008

- The Cutting Room Floor, Vol. 2 (2008, The Alchemist, ALC Records)
  - "F*cking Up My Cool"

2014

- Shady XV (Disc V) (2014, Shady Records, Interscope Records)
  - "Cry Now" (Shady Remix) (Obie Trice featuring Kuniva, Stat Quo, Bobby Creekwater & Cashis)

=== Guest appearances ===
2004

- Magic City (P-Money, 2004, Dirty Records)
  - "Two Step" (P-Money feat. Jatis) (Bobby Creekwater & Charlie Jangles)
  - "Anyway" (P-Money feat. Bobby Creekwater & Aasim)

2008

- Checks and Balance (Stat Quo, 2008)
  - "Say You Will (Remix)" (Stat Quo feat. Bobby Creekwater)

2009

- 40 Akerz (Skinny & Scales (Nappy Roots), 2009, Atlantic Records)
  - "Motivation" (Skinny & Scales feat. Bobby Creekwater)
- Crack a Bottle (Shady Remix) (Eminem, 2009, Shady Records)
  - "Crack a Bottle (Shady Remix)" (Eminem feat. Cashis & Bobby Creekwater)
