= Eminem Presents: The Re-Up =

Compilation album by Shady Records
- Released: December 5, 2006
- Recorded: 2001–2006
- Genres: Hardcore hip hop; gangsta rap; horrorcore
- Length: 74:38
- Labels: Shady; Interscope
- Producers: Eminem; Akon; The Alchemist; Disco D; Dr. Dre; Dawaun Parker; Focus...; L.T. Moe; Luis Resto; Rikanatti; Witt & Pep

Shady Records chronology
8 Mile: Music from and Inspired by the Motion Picture (2002)	Eminem Presents: The Re-Up (2006)	Shady XV (2014)

Singles from Eminem Presents: The Re-Up
- 1. "You Don't Know" Released: November 5, 2006; 2. "Jimmy Crack Corn" Released: March 6, 2007

Eminem Presents: The Re-Up or simply known as The Re-Up, is a compilation album performed by various artists of American record label, Shady Records. The album features performances by Shady Records artists Eminem, D12, Obie Trice, 50 Cent, Stat Quo, Bobby Creekwater and Cashis, while affiliated artists such as Lloyd Banks, Akon and Nate Dogg, made guest appearances. The album debuted at number two on the US Billboard 200 chart and has since sold over one million copies in the US alone, being certified platinum by the RIAA.

== Background ==
The album began as a street mixtape project; an underground, unofficial CD with raw production values. "But what happened is that the material was so good and the tracks were getting produced like a regular album", Eminem said: "Instead of putting it out there rough and unfinished, I thought we should add some other new tracks, make it a real album, and put it in the record stores to give these new artists a real boost".

Rampant misinformation about Eminem Presents: The Re-Up included many false internet track listings and the claim that the mixtape would be a tribute to the late Proof of D12. "The D12 album and those unreleased songs with Proof are coming", said Eminem, "but The Re-Up is about these new artists and these new songs. It isn't fair to them or to the memory of Proof to mix them up".

The Re-Up's cover art was drawn by Eminem, and depicts the featured artists except for Akon and Nate Dogg, the only two artists that are not signed to Shady, Aftermath or G-Unit.

== Reception ==
Professional ratings
Aggregate scores
Source	Rating
Metacritic	50/100
Review scores
Source	Rating
AllMusic	3.5/5 stars
Dotmusic	4/10
Entertainment Weekly	B
The Guardian	2/5 stars
HipHopDX	3.5/5 stars
NOW	2/5 stars
PopMatters	3/10
RapReviews	7/10
Rolling Stone	2/5 stars
Stylus Magazine	D

According to the review aggregator Metacritic, Eminem Presents: The Re-Up received "mixed or average reviews" based on a weighted average score of 50 out of 100 from 13 critic scores.

== Commercial performance ==
Eminem Presents: The Re-Up debuted at number 2 on US Billboard 200 chart, selling about 309,000 copies in its first week. In its second week, the album fell to number 13 in the Billboard 200, selling 151,000 copies. As of March 16, 2007, the album was certified platinum by the Recording Industry Association of America (RIAA), for selling of one million copies in the United States. As of January 2016, worldwide sales are at 2,051,000.

== Track listing ==
No.	Title	Writer(s)	Producer(s)	Length
1.	"Shady Narcotics" (Eminem Intro)	Marshall Mathers; Luis Resto; Steve King	Eminem	0:56
2.	"We're Back" (Eminem, Obie Trice, Stat Quo, Bobby Creekwater and Cashis)	Mathers; Obie Trice; Stanley Benton; Antione Rogers; Ramone Johnson; Resto	Eminem; Resto^{[a]}	3:59
3.	"Pistol Pistol" (Remix) (Obie Trice)	Obie Trice; Mathers; Denaun Porter; Von Carlisle; Ondre Moore; Rufus Johnson; DeShaun Holton	Eminem	2:25
4.	"Murder" (Bizarre and Kuniva)	Rufus Johnson; Carlisle; Mathers; Resto	Eminem; Resto^{[a]}	2:10
5.	"Everything Is Shady" (Cashis)	Ramone Johnson; Ricky Parham	Rikanatti	4:29
6.	"The Re-Up" (Eminem and 50 Cent)	Mathers; Curtis Jackson; Andre Young; Mike Elizondo; Resto	Eminem; Resto^{[a]}	2:57
7.	"You Don't Know" (Eminem, 50 Cent, Lloyd Banks and Cashis)	Mathers; Jackson; Christopher Lloyd; Ramone Johnson; Resto	Eminem; Resto^{[a]}	4:17
8.	"Jimmy Crack Corn" (Eminem and 50 Cent)	Mathers; Jackson; Resto	Eminem; Resto^{[a]}	3:54
9.	"Trapped" (Proof)	Holton; Mathers	Eminem	0:58
10.	"Whatever You Want" (Swifty McVay and Mr. Porter)	Ondre Moore; Porter; Dewitt Moore; Bryan Johnson; Darrell Campbell	Witt and Pep	2:48
11.	"Talkin' All That" (Cashis)	Ramone Johnson; Parham	Rikanatti	4:05
12.	"By My Side" (Stat Quo)	Stanley Benton; Bernard Edwards Jr.	Focus...	4:06
13.	"We Ride For Shady" (Cashis and Obie Trice)	Ramone Johnson; Trice; Alan Maman; Bobby Heath; Eric Peters; Robert Hunter	The Alchemist	3:08
14.	"There He Is" (Bobby Creekwater)	Rogers; Maman; Fred Bungusto	The Alchemist	4:24
15.	"Tryin' Ta Win" (Stat Quo)	Benton; Maman	The Alchemist	3:52
16.	"Smack That" (Remix) (Akon featuring Stat Quo and Bobby Creekwater)	Benton; Rogers; Aliaume Thiam; Mike Strange; Mathers; Resto	Akon	5:11
17.	"Public Enemy #1" (Eminem)	Mathers; Resto	Eminem	1:54
18.	"Get Low" (Stat Quo)	Benton; Young; Dawaun Parker; Elizondo; Todd Moore	Dr. Dre; Dawaun Parker^{[a]}	3:19
19.	"Ski Mask Way" (Eminem Remix) (50 Cent)	Jackson; Mathers; Resto; David Shayman; Bunny Sigler; Ronald Tyson; King	Disco D; Eminem^{[a]}; Resto^{[a]}	3:03
20.	"Shake That" (Remix) (Nate Dogg, Obie Trice and Bobby Creekwater)	Mathers; Nathaniel Hale; Trice; Rogers; Resto; King	Eminem; Resto^{[a]}	2:59
21.	"Cry Now" (Shady Remix) (Obie Trice, Kuniva, Bobby Creekwater, Cashis and Stat Quo)	Trice; Carlisle; Rogers; Ramone Johnson; Benton; Dewitt Moore; B. Johnson; Joseph Scott; Don Robey; Corey Louis; Campbell	Witt and Pep	5:09
22.	"No Apologies" (Eminem)	Mathers; Resto	Eminem; Resto^{[a]}	4:18
23.	"Billion Bucks" (Bonus track) (Stat Quo)	Benton; Todd Moore	L.T. Moe	3:41

Notes

- ^{^[a]} signifies an additional producer

== Charts ==
=== Weekly charts ===
Chart (2006)	Peak position
Australian Albums (ARIA)	17
Austrian Albums (Ö3 Austria)	12
Belgian Albums (Ultratop Flanders)	44
Belgian Albums (Ultratop Wallonia)	92
Canadian Albums (Billboard)	2
Canadian Alternative Albums (Nielsen SoundScan)	1
Canadian R&B Albums (Nielsen SoundScan)	1
Danish Albums (Hitlisten)	25
Dutch Albums (Album Top 100)	66
French Albums (SNEP)	41
German Albums (Offizielle Top 100)	15
Hungarian Albums (MAHASZ)	21
Italian Albums (FIMI)	33
New Zealand Albums (RMNZ)	1
Norwegian Albums (VG-lista)	35
South African Albums (RISA)	1
Swiss Albums (Schweizer Hitparade)	9
UK Album Downloads (Official Charts)	2
UK Compilation Albums (Official Charts)	3
UK R&B Albums (Official Charts)	1
US Billboard 200	2
US Top R&B/Hip-Hop Albums (Billboard)	2

=== Year-end charts ===
Chart (2007)	Position
US Billboard 200	44
US Top R&B/Hip-Hop Albums (Billboard)	27

== Certifications ==
Region	Certification	Certified units/sales
Australia (ARIA)	Platinum	70,000^{‡}
Ireland (IRMA)	Platinum	15,000^{^}
New Zealand (RMNZ)	2× Platinum	30,000^{^}
Russia (NFPF)	Platinum	20,000^{*}
South Africa (RISA)	Gold	20,000^{*}
Switzerland (IFPI Switzerland)	Gold	15,000^{^}
United Kingdom (BPI)	Platinum	300,000^{‡}
United States (RIAA)	Platinum	1,000,000^{^}
^{*} Sales figures based on certification alone.^{^} Shipments figures based on certification alone.^{‡} Sales+streaming figures based on certification alone.
