= Cashis =

American rapper (born 1982)

- Also known as: Lil Ramone; Bogish Boy
- Born: Ramone Johnson; October 10, 1982 (age 44); Chicago, Illinois, U.S.
- Genre: Hip hop
- Occupations: Rapper; songwriter
- Years active: 1996–present
- Labels: Bogish Brand (current); Shady; Interscope; RBC (former)
- Website: cashisonline.com

Ramone Johnson (born October 10, 1982), better known by his stage name Cashis (stylized as Ca$his), is an American rapper who was born and raised in Chicago, but moved to Irvine, California. He was most notably featured on the Shady Records album Eminem Presents: The Re-Up with Eminem and the record label, and released The County Hound EP in 2007. The County Hound EP sold 6,700 copies in its first week and debuted on the US Billboard 200 at number 106. He's best known for appearing on Eminem's song, "You Don't Know", featuring 50 Cent and Lloyd Banks.

In August 2011 on his mixtape Rooftop Series Vol.1, in the intro, Cashis revealed that he was leaving Shady Records, but is remaining with Bogish Brand Entertainment. After many delays, his solo debut album, The Art of Dying, was released independently on October 30, 2012, but failed to chart. On October 15, 2013, he released his second studio album The County Hound 2, which contained significant production from Eminem and was supported by five retail singles.

== Career ==
=== 1996–2006: Beginnings and signing to Shady Records ===
Cashis first got into rapping by freestyling with his cousin at the early age of 12. At the age of 14, he went to the studio for the first time and professionally recorded his first song. Around age 17, he got serious about rapping and would go around the Los Angeles and Orange County area participating in rap battles under the name "Lil Ramone".

By 2004, Cashis was regarded as the "rap king of Orange County" and attracted the attention of Shady Records A&R, Dart Parker, who signed him after hearing mixtape by Renegadez, Stars with Stripes. Cashis's introduction to the masses, however, wouldn't come until 2006 when he appeared alongside Eminem, 50 Cent and Lloyd Banks on "You Don't Know" the first single from the platinum-selling Shady Records compilation, Eminem Presents: The Re-Up, performing solo on the songs "Everything Is Shady" and "Talkin' All That". His solo track "Talkin' All That" was praised by Complex as an album standout.

=== 2007–2012: The County Hound EP and The Art of Dying ===
His first solo release on Shady Records was the successful eight track EP, The County Hound EP, on May 22, 2007. The County Hound EP debuted at number 106 on the US Billboard 200 and 37 on the Top R&B/Hip-Hop Albums chart. The album was primarily produced by Eminem, who was also the only featured artist on the project. The EP was met with mixed reviews upon its release from music critics. Some critics praised it as a solid introduction to Cashis, however others put down the gangster themes of the album's tracks. Upon its release he announced that his debut studio album would be titled, Loose Cannon and feature production from Eminem, Sha Money XL, Dr. Dre, and The Alchemist. At the time he set a release period for September or October 2007 for the project.

In 2009, Cashis promised he would have an album in stores by September. However the album was pushed back, allegedly due to projects from Eminem and 50 Cent. He would wait to release his album and then request his release from Shady Records which was not finalized until 2012. As of 2013 he still remained contracted to them as a songwriter. In promotion of his debut LP Cashis released the Church on the Move mixtape. His debut full-length album titled The Art of Dying was released independently on October 30, 2012, with features coming from Rick Ross, Game, K-Young and Royce da 5'9" among others. Eminem also produced one song on the album titled as "You Think That I'm Crazy". Neither the album nor any of the songs on it charted in the United States.

=== 2012–2014: The County Hound 2 and Euthanasia ===
Just prior to the release of The Art of Dying, Cashis revealed he had begun to work on his second studio album, which he claimed was 65% done in September 2012. He also revealed that it would feature production from Jake One and Eminem, also projecting a May 2013 release. However, the release of the album did not occur when projected. On December 25, 2012, Cashis released another mixtape titled Loose Cannon which was previously going to be the title of his third studio album. On April 30, 2013, Cashis released the first single from his newly titled second studio album The County Hound 2, titled "Layin in the Cut" which was produced by Eminem and Rikanatti. The music video for the song was released on August 8, 2013, which also featured a preview of the music video for "Look At Me". The second single from the album titled, "Mind on My Money (Money on My Mind)" was released to iTunes on May 16, 2013. The song features rappers Kuniva from D12, Obie Trice and Dirty Mouth.

On July 1, 2013, Cashis released the third single from The County Hound 2, "Imma Hustla" featuring Crooked I and Sullee J. In July 2013, Ca$his announced that he was currently also working on his next mixtape The Loose Cannon 2 which will contain mostly freestyles. Then on August 19, 2013, he released the fourth single from The Country Hound 2, titled "Look at Me" featuring King Los, K Young, and B. Todd. On September 28, 2013, Cashis revealed the cover art and track list to the album, also announcing a release date of October 15, 2013. He also revealed unannounced guest appearances on the album to come from Boaz, and Demrick among others, with the album's production to be primarily handled by frequent collaborator Rikanatti, with Eminem also producing four tracks on the album.

In October 2013, leading up to the release of The County Hound 2, Cashis revealed that he had already recorded five or six records for his third studio album. Then on April 1, 2014, Cashis released "I'ma Ride" featuring Problem as the first single from the album. The album's second single titled "Bird Call", was released on May 6, 2014. Then on May 16, 2014, Cashis announced that the album, titled Euthanasia would be released on July 1, 2014. Its third single "100 Proof" featuring Roccett was released on May 28, 2014.

=== 2015–present: I'm Getten Mine & County Hound 3 ===
In early January 2015, Cashis released the cover art for his long-awaited I'm Getten Mine mixtape, which was released a few days later for purchase on iTunes. On April 7, 2015, Cashis released his fourth studio album, The County Hound 3. Three singles were released in promotion of the album. The lead single "A-Rod" features Emilio Rojas. The second single "Work" features Young Buck, Project Pat & Sullee J. The third single released was "Kingpin" featuring Young Buck, Arez Cobain & June B. The County Hound 3 did not have any chart success. Cashis released CH4 in 2019

== Discography ==
=== Studio albums ===
List of albums
Title	Album details
The Art of Dying	Released: October 30, 2012; Label: Bogish Brand, RBC; Format: CD, digital download
The County Hound 2	Released: October 15, 2013; Label: Bogish Brand; Format: CD, digital download
Bogish Boy, Vol. 1	Released: July 15, 2014; Label: Bogish Brand; Format: Digital download
The County Hound 3	Released: April 7, 2015; Label: Bogish Brand; Format: Digital download
Shady Capo	Released: January 15, 2016; Label: Bogish Brand; Format: Digital download
Ca-$	Released: May 20, 2016; Label: Bogish Brand; Format: Digital download
1 of 1	Released: May 5, 2017; Label: Bogish Brand; Format: Digital download
The Art of Living	Released: May 3, 2019; Label: X-Ray; Format: CD, LP, digital download
CH4	Released: September 6, 2019; Label: Bogish Brand; Format: Digital download
County Hound 5	Released: November 20, 2020; Label: Bogish Brand; Format: Digital download
CountyHound 6	Released: December 30, 2023; Label: Bogish Brand; Format: CD, digital download

=== Compilation albums ===
List of albums, with selected chart positions, sales figures and certifications
Title	Album details	Peak chart positions									Sales	Certifications
Title	Album details	US	AUS	BEL (FL)	CAN	FRA	GER	NZ	SWI	UK	Sales	Certifications
Eminem Presents: The Re-Up	Compilation album with Shady Records; Released: December 5, 2006; Label: Shady, Interscope; Format: CD, LP, digital download	2	17	44	2	41	15	1	9	3^{[D]}	US: 1,051,508	RIAA: Platinum; ARIA: Gold; RIANZ: 2× Platinum
Euthanasia	Released: June 24, 2014; Label: Bogish Brand; Format: Digital download	—	—	—	—	—	—	—	—	—		
Euthanasia 2	Released: December 11, 2015; Label: Bogish Brand; Format: Digital download	—	—	—	—	—	—	—	—	—		
Ca-$ 1.5	Released: September 9, 2016; Label: Bogish Brand; Format: Digital download	—	—	—	—	—	—	—	—	—		
Ca$his, Vol. 3.5	Released: December 22, 2017; Label: Bogish Brand; Format: Digital download	—	—	—	—	—	—	—	—	—		
Ca$his, Vol. 4	Released: December 22, 2018; Label: Bogish Brand; Format: Digital download	—	—	—	—	—	—	—	—	—		
Vault 5.	Released: June 18, 2021; Label: Bogish Brand, Stay Solid; Format: Digital download	—	—	—	—	—	—	—	—	—		
"—" denotes a recording that did not chart or was not released in that territory.

=== Extended plays ===
List of EPs, with selected chart positions
Title	Album details	Peak chart positions		
Title	Album details	US	US R&B	US Rap
The County Hound EP	Release date: May 22, 2007; Label: Shady, Interscope; Format: CD, digital download	106	37	14
The Vault 2	Release date: December 18, 2012; Label: Bogish Brand; Format: Digital download	—	—	—
Ca$his	Release date: August 18, 2017; Label: Bogish Brand; Format: Digital download	—	—	—
Ca$his Vol. 2	Release date: October 6, 2017; Label: Bogish Brand; Format: Digital download	—	—	—
Ca$his, Vol. 3	Release date: November 24, 2017; Label: Bogish Brand; Format: Digital download	—	—	—
I'ma Ride	Release date: December 27, 2018; Label: X-Ray; Format: Digital download	—	—	—
Mone G, Vol. 1	Release date: February 8, 2019 March 27, 2020 (re-release with the different track listing); Label: Bogish Brand; Format: Digital download	—	—	—
Loose Cannon	Release date: April 10, 2020; Label: Bogish Brand; Format: Digital download	—	—	—
OG & Green Tea 2	Release date: May 1, 2020; Label: Bogish Brand; Format: Digital download	—	—	—
The Vault 3	Release date: July 10, 2020; Label: Bogish Brand; Format: Digital download	—	—	—
Vault 4	Release date: September 25, 2020; Label: Bogish Brand; Format: Digital download	—	—	—
What I'm Bout	Release date: October 2, 2020; Label: Bogish Brand; Format: Digital download	—	—	—
Ringz	Release date: October 30, 2020; Label: Bogish Brand; Format: Digital download	—	—	—
OG & Green Tea 6	Release date: March 18, 2022; Label: Bogish Brand; Format: Streaming	—	—	—
Bogi$Htape 1	Release date: July 1, 2022; Label: Bogish Brand, Stay Solid; Format: Digital download	—	—	—
Bogi$Htape 2	Release date: July 15, 2022; Label: Bogish Brand, Stay Solid; Format: Digital download	—	—	—
Bogish Brand Radio vol 1	Release date: July 29, 2022; Label: Bogish Brand, Stay Solid; Format: Digital download	—	—	—
BBG Radio 3	Release date: August 12, 2022; Label: Bogish Brand, Stay Solid; Format: Streaming	—	—	—
CH 6 EP 1	Release date: February 9, 2024; Label: Bogish Brand, Stay Solid; Format: Streaming	—	—	—
CH 6 EP 2	Release date: February 23, 2024; Label: Bogish Brand, Stay Solid; Format: Streaming	—	—	—
CH6 EP3	Release date: March 8, 2024; Label: Bogish Brand; Format: Streaming	—	—	—
"—" denotes a title that did not chart, or was not released in that territory.

=== Mixtapes ===
- 2006: Bogish Boy Vol. 1
- 2007: Bogish Boy Vol. 2
- 2008: The Leak
- 2008: Bogish Boy 300
- 2008: All Eyez on Me
- 2008: Blacc Jesus
- 2008: Global Warning 3
- 2008: Homeland Security (with Young De; hosted by DJ Whoo Kid)
- 2008: Loose Cannon
- 2008: Loose Cannon: The Cut Off
- 2008: Bogish Boy Vol. 4: Incase You Forgot
- 2009: The Leak Vol.2: Get Ready
- 2009: Bogish Boy Vol.5: Euthanasia
- 2010: The Re-Introduction
- 2011: The Vault
- 2011: Rooftop Series Vol.1
- 2012: Church on the Move
- 2012: Loose Cannon (Hosted by DJ Far)
- 2014: OG & Green Tea
- 2015: I'm Getten Mine
- 2016: The Cook Up
- 2016: The Cook Up 2
- 2017: Westbrook MVP
- 2017: Before 1 of 1
- 2017: Love Life Loyalty
- 2017: The Best Now
- 2017: Og & Green Tea 2
- 2020: OG & Green Tea
- 2020: Bogish
- 2020: Og 3
- 2021: OG & Green Tea 4
- 2021: Tlrnl
- 2022: BBG Radio vol. 2
- 2023: OG & Green Tea 5

=== Collaborative albums ===
- 2020: Tha Roll Up (with The Roll Up Clique)
- 2023: Roll Up (with The Roll Up Clique)
- 2023: Roll Up 2 (with The Roll Up Clique)

=== Singles ===
Song	Year	Peak chart positions			Certifications	Album
Song	Year	US	US R&B	US Pop	Certifications	Album
"You Don't Know" (with 50 Cent, Eminem and Lloyd Banks)	2006	12	87	16	ARIA: Gold	Eminem Presents: The Re-Up (with Shady Records)
"Lac Motion"	2007	—	—	—		The County Hound EP
"Take U Home"	2010	—	—	—		The Vault
"My Name Iz"	2010	—	—	—		—N/a
"Put It on My Life"	2010	—	—	—		—N/a
"Layin in the Cut"	2013	—	—	—		The County Hound 2
"Mind on My Money (Money on My Mind)" (featuring Kuniva, Obie Trice & Dirty Mouth)	2013	—	—	—		The County Hound 2
"Imma Hustla" (featuring Crooked I & Sullee J)	2013	—	—	—		The County Hound 2
"Look at Me" (featuring King Los, K Young & B Todd)	2013	—	—	—		The County Hound 2
"Hi"	2013	—	—	—		The County Hound 2
"I'ma Ride" (featuring Problem)	2014	—	—	—		Euthanasia
"Bird Call"	2014	—	—	—		Euthanasia
"100 Proof" (featuring Roccett)	2014	—	—	—		Euthanasia
"Take the Pain" (featuring Demrick and Sara Shine)	2014	—	—	—		The County Hound 2
"A-Rod" (featuring Emilio Rojas)	2014	—	—	—		The County Hound 3
"Work" (featuring Young Buck, Project Pat & Sullee J)	2015	—	—	—		The County Hound 3
"Kingpin" (featuring Young Buck, Arez Cobain & June B)	2015	—	—	—		The County Hound 3
"—" denotes a recording that did not chart or was not released in that territory.

=== Guest appearances ===
List of non-single guest appearances, with other performing artists, showing year released and album name
Title	Year	Other artist(s)	Album
"We on Yo Line"	2007	The Federation	It's Whateva
"Syllables"	2007	Dr. Dre, Eminem, Jay-Z, 50 Cent, Stat Quo	
"Famous Anthem" (Remix)	2007	Expensive Taste, Mitchy Slick, Hayes, Lil' Spank Booty, Krondon, Chace Infinite	Expen$ive Taste
"I Got That Product"	2008	Tony Yayo	Drug Users Handbook
"Top of the Foodchain"	2008	The Alchemist	The Cutting Room Floor, Vol. 2
"Just Like Us"	2010	Knoc-turn'al, One-2	1-11-11 (The Prequel)
"Just Because"	2010	Q-Unique, Realm Reality	Between Heaven & Hell
"Do It All"	2012	Joe Young, Rick Ross, The Game, K. Young	—N/a
"Goonz (Remix)"	2013	Novoa, Killah Priest, Bully, Tha Advocate, Young Buck	Digital Dynasty 25
"Motive"	2013	Richard Osborne, Mistah F.A.B.	Nothing Personal
"Work"	2013	A-Wax, Waka Flocka Flame	Jesus Malverde
"Die"	2013	Raiza	Young & Reckless
"Faded"	2013	TNL	Planet Purp
"So Fly"	2013	C.L.R.	—N/a
"Tear It Up"	2014	TNL	Grindhouse
"Pop That"	2015	TNL	Good Vibes, Vol. 1
"Life of a Ryder"	2015	TNL	Good Vibes, Vol. 1
"Nowhere to Go"	2015	TNL, Kobe	Good Vibes, Vol. 1
"HoodStar"	2015	DFR	The Motto: Fo' the Fam' I Salute
"Feel The Heaterz"	2016	Madd Manny, Spliff Butcha	The Axis: Armageddon
"Crazy"	2016	C-Sharp, Kaliber	Orange County Alliance
"watching-eyes"	2017	Sol 8	Eveningstar.
"The Godfather"	2020	Meidai	PROJECT L.S.D
"Seat of a Chevy"	2021	Joe Far, White Smoke	Blood Moon 2
