= Stat Quo =

American rapper (born 1978)

- Born: Stanley Bernard Benton; July 24, 1979 (age 47); Atlanta, Georgia, U.S.
- Education: University of Florida (BS)
- Genres: Hip hop
- Occupations: Rapper; record producer; songwriter
- Years active: 2002–present
- Labels: ATLA; Blood Money; Shady; Aftermath; Interscope; EMI; BluRoc; Dream Big; The Firm
- Website: www.statquo.com

Stanley Bernard Benton (born July 24, 1979), better known by his stage name Stat Quo, is an American rapper and record producer. Benton worked his way to college and attended University of Florida, where he majored in economics and international business in 2000. He was contemplating law school, until veteran Southern rapper Scarface encouraged him to rap professionally. In February 2003, Stat Quo released his first installment of the Underground Atlanta Mixtapes and caught the attention of Aftermath Entertainment associate Mel-Man. When Stat Quo was in L.A. performing at Encore, Mel-Man invited him to Record One Studios where he met Dr. Dre. That night at Record One, Stat Quo recorded the song "The Future" with Dr. Dre and released it on the second volume of his Underground Atlanta mixtape in 2004. The tape made its way by a different route to Eminem and led to Stat Quo's record deal with Shady Records and Aftermath Entertainment. Stat Quo is currently managing Young Aspect, and formerly managed Lil Xan.

After 50 Cent, Stat Quo was the second and only other artist, until Ez Mil in 2023, signed to both Shady Records and Aftermath Entertainment; he became Dr. Dre and Eminem's newest protégé. Stat Quo was supposed to release his debut album, Statlanta, with Shady/Aftermath/Interscope but, despite being made three different times, the album was never released by the labels. Statlanta was finally released in 2010 by Sha Money XL's label Dream Big Ventures. Stat Quo has continued his career in the entertainment industry by earning production and writing credits as well as release more studio albums and launching a record label called Blood Money Entertainment, with West Coast-based rapper The Game.

== Early life ==
Stanley Benton was born in Thomasville Heights, a neighborhood of Atlanta, at Grady Memorial Hospital. In his early life, he lived with his mother and grandmother. Benton started freestyle rapping at around the age of 12 with his cousin D. Later, his mother bought him a radio, and he would record himself rapping. In 1997, Benton started taking rap seriously, but continued with his education.

== Career ==
=== 2003–2007: Shady Records / Aftermath Entertainment ===
Stat Quo was discovered towards the end of 2003. Dr. Dre and Eminem individually learned of the Atlanta-based rapper via his Underground Atlanta mixtapes. After Eminem heard his music, he gained interest and passed it on to Dr. Dre, and a joint deal was reached, resulting in Stat Quo becoming signed to both Aftermath Entertainment and Shady Records.

His debut album Statlanta was originally slated to be released in 2003, under Interscope Records, but was repeatedly pushed back until finally being released independently in 2010, although heavily reworked and not the original Statlanta recorded under Shady/Aftermath, although Dr. Dre was involved during the production as a supervisor. Stat Quo is also featured on Young Buck's Straight Outta Cashville, Eminem's compilation album Eminem Presents the Re-Up (on tracks "By My Side", Tryin' Ta Win", "Get Low", and on the bonus track "Billion Bucks"), and on the track "Spend Some Time" on Eminem's Encore. Stat has also appeared on tracks with artists such as Jermaine Dupri, The Alchemist, The Game, Disturbing tha Peace, and Chamillionaire. Stat Quo has said that his "number one goal is to bring a respect, and bring a voice to this whole southern movement around the world."

In 2005, Stat Quo shot a video for his single "Like Dat". The song was made to be a buzz single, in order to help the artist become more exposed. The video was shot in Atlanta's Zone 3 near the Thomasville Heights projects where Stat Quo was raised and explained his reason for choosing the location in an interview, stating "It's the beginning of my career, so I wanted to start where I began life, […] Plus, [the city of Atlanta] is supposed to be tearing the projects down, so I wanted to showcase the area I grew up in and capture it before it was gone forever", it featured a cameo appearance by fellow Atlanta rapper Ludacris.

He was featured on the summer 2005 Anger Management Tour, which also included Eminem, 50 Cent, G-Unit, Obie Trice, D12, and others. On July 13, 2005, a tour bus carrying Eminem's entourage for the summer's Anger Management tour swerved off the road and turned over. Stat Quo was taken to Independence Regional Health Center in Independence, Missouri, where he was treated and released.

=== 2008–2010: Statlanta ===
In October 2008, he left Shady Records and Aftermath Entertainment, unhappy with the release status of Statlanta. On April 21, 2009, Stat Quo independently released Smokin Mirrors, a street album, through EMI. Stat Quo hoped to release the album in 2009, and promoted the album by releasing multiple mixtapes for free download in 2009, including Quo City, Checks & Balance, and The Invisible Man. It ended up being released on July 13, 2010.

In 2009, with distribution from The Orchard, producer Sha Money XL founded a new record label, Dream Big Ventures. Quickly upon its creation, Stat Quo was signed to the label. Statlanta was released on the label.

In March 2010, Stat Quo appeared in a HP commercial alongside Dr. Dre promoting HP Beats Audio Laptops, featuring a song taken from Dr. Dre's anticipated upcoming third studio album Detox, in which Stat Quo has worked and provided songwriting.

=== 2011–present: Songwriting, new label and ATLA ===
In 2011, Stat Quo was cited at Dr. Dre's Aftermath Entertainment website as a signed songwriter to Aftermath Entertainment. On July 23, 2012 Wiz Khalifa released a song titled "Far from Coach" as a promotional single from his second studio album O.N.I.F.C., the track features former Aftermath Entertainment artists Stat Quo and Game, although the song didn't make the cut in the album. The reunion formed a business partnership from both Stat Quo and Game. In late 2012, both rappers founded Rolex Records, which was later renamed to The Firm. Both artists will use the label to release new music and sign other artists. He also executive produced and appeared on a hidden skit in Jesus Piece, The Game's fifth studio album and last under Interscope Records.

On September 9, 2013, Stat Quo released the first single "Michael" (a tribute to Michael Jordan, Mike Tyson, & Michael Jackson) from his upcoming second studio album titled ATLA, an acronym for "All This Life Allows", confirmed to appear as a bonus track. It was produced by Tone Mason, who is the album's lead producer. On October 8, 2013, rapper Game released a mixtape titled OKE: Operation Kill Everything to promote his upcoming studio album, the mixtape was released under The Firm, making it the first release of the label. The mixtape is executive produced by and features Stat Quo on the track "Compton".

On December 16, 2013, the second single from ATLA was released. The track is titled "Trillion" featuring Dre from production duo Cool & Dre and produced by Tone Mason, who also produced "Michael", the album's lead single. On December 17, 2013, Stat Quo released the long-awaited FUPM Is the Future with Bobby Creekwater under the acronym FUPM meaning "Fuck U Pay Me". The album was initially announced in December 2011 but it was shelved while both artists pursued other ventures. Bobby Creekwater finally announced the official release date on December 4, 2013. The first two singles for the album "Alright Alright" & "Blast Off" were released late 2011 and the final single was dropped on December 10, 2013, called "Old School New School".

On December 20, 2013, Stat Quo released the third single off ATLA entitled "OutKast". The single was produced by DeUno, and it is a tribute song to Atlanta rap group OutKast. ATLA is set to be released in 2014. On January 6, 2014, Stat Quo released the fourth single off ATLA entitled "That's Life, Part 1". The single was produced by Bink. With the release of this single, Stat Quo announced the official release date of ATLA as February 15, 2014, which was his son's birthday.

== Discography ==
- 2006: Eminem Presents: The Re-Up (with Shady Records)
- 2009: Smokin Mirrors
- 2009: Great Depression
- 2010: Statlanta
- 2013: FUPM Is the Future (with Bobby Creekwater as FUPM)
- 2014: ATLA: All This Life Allows, Vol. 1
