= Shady Records =

American record label

- Parent company: Universal Music Group
- Founded: 1999; 27 years ago
- Founder: Eminem; Paul Rosenberg
- Distributors: Interscope Geffen A&M (US); Polydor (United Kingdom); Universal Music Group (International)
- Genre: Hip hop
- Country of origin: United States
- Location: New York City, U.S.; Detroit, Michigan, U.S.
- Official website: shadyrecords.com

Shady Records is an American record label founded by rapper Eminem and his manager Paul Rosenberg in 1999, following the commercially successful release of The Slim Shady LP that same year. The label's name comes from the last name of Eminem's alter ego, Slim Shady.

The Shady Records roster was showcased on their 2006 compilation album, Eminem Presents: The Re-Up, which peaked at number 2 on the Billboard 200. The label's roster was also predominantly featured on the soundtrack to the film 8 Mile; the film starred Eminem while the album was led by the single "Lose Yourself". The song became the first hip hop song to win an Academy Award for Best Original Song.

Shady Records has signed and released projects for acts including Eminem himself, his group D12, Obie Trice, 50 Cent, Cashis, Bad Meets Evil, Slaughterhouse, Yelawolf, Griselda, Westside Gunn, Conway the Machine and Grip; its roster as of 2026 includes Westside Boogie, Ez Mil and IDK.

== History ==
=== 1999–2004: Formation, first generation, growth and feuds ===
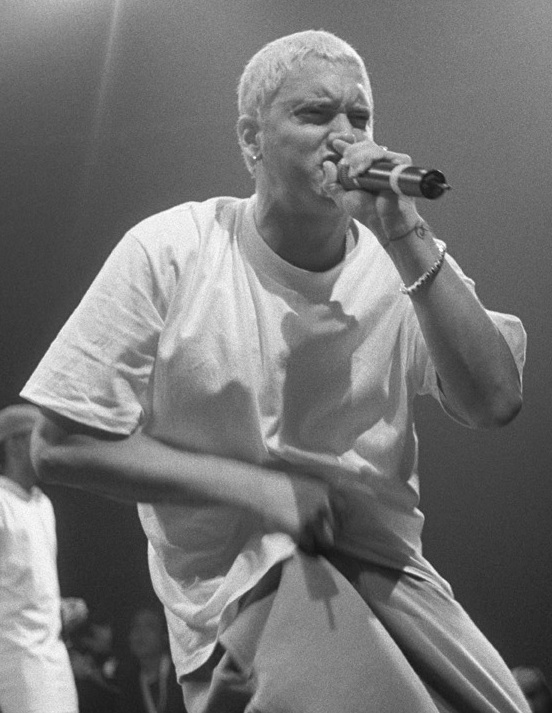
Eminem founded Shady Records in 1999.

After Eminem released The Slim Shady LP, he started his own record label in late 1999. Eminem looked for an avenue to release D12, and Rosenberg was keen to start a label, which led to the two teaming up to form Shady. Its A&R Marc Labelle has defined the record label as "a boutique label but [with] all the outlets of a major [and] Interscope backing up our every move."

D12 was the first act signed by Shady as they had been rapping together since the 1990s, and the members had made a promise that whoever became successful would come back and sign the others. In June 2001, D12 released Devil's Night, peaking at #1 on the Billboard 200, earning 371,000 copies during the first week of release. Obie Trice was introduced to Eminem through D12's Bizarre. Eminem signed him in June 2001 as the second Shady act. Obie Trice first got public attention via a freestyle skit on the Devil's Night album and The Eminem Show track, "Drips".

While working on the film 8 Mile, Eminem had a meeting with then underground rapper 50 Cent. Eminem had heard 50 Cent's mixtape, Guess Who's Back?, taken them to Dr. Dre and offered him the chance to work together on the artist. 50 Cent became the first solo artist signed to Shady and Aftermath. The 8 Mile soundtrack was the third Shady LP to be released. The first single was "Lose Yourself", which earned multiple nominations and became a surprise win of an Academy Award for Best Original Song, the first time a hip hop song had ever won the award. The second single was 50 Cent's "Wanksta", which was released as a buzz track and became popular in 50 Cent's home town. During this time, Eminem had also made a deal with DJ Green Lantern, who released the label's first mixtape, Invasion!, in 2002. He was the DJ for Eminem during the Anger Management Tour.

The fourth release from Shady was 50 Cent's Get Rich or Die Tryin', in February 2003. The album became the fastest selling debut in U.S. history, selling 872,000 copies in its first week. Next to be released from Shady was Obie Trice's debut album, Cheers, six months later. Despite being commercial successful, the LP was considered overshadowed by 50 Cent's music at the time. In 2003, Shady was involved in several controversies with the likes of the inherited Murder Inc. feud that 50 Cent and G-Unit were involved in, on-going problems with the previous co-owners of The Source magazine, namely Benzino, as well as escalating issues with rapper Royce da 5'9", who was previously a friend of Eminem and D12, until they reunited in 2010.

Near the end of 2003, Eminem and Dr. Dre signed a joint deal with Stat Quo. Stat Quo became the second artist to be signed to Shady and Aftermath. The following year saw the release of D12's second album, D12 World. Also, in 2004, Eminem and Rosenberg began a venture offered by Sirius Satellite Radio that saw the airing of their uncensored hip hop radio station, Shade 45. Shady DJ, DJ Green Lantern, was given his own show, whilst 50 Cent's G-Unit DJ, DJ Whoo Kid, co-hosted G-Unit Radio on Saturdays.

=== 2005–2009: Development and Eminem Presents: The Re-Up ===
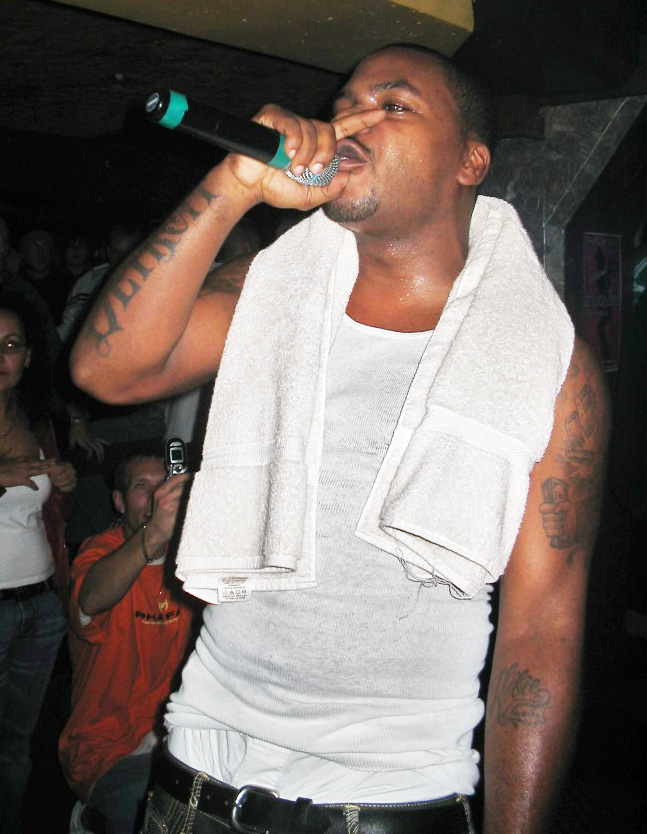
Obie Trice released two albums on the label, before leaving Shady in 2008.

2005 saw the release of 50 Cent's second release, The Massacre, which set a record as the sixth fastest selling album since Nielsen SoundScan started tracking albums in 1991, with 1.14 million albums sold in four days. The album was a commercial success, and was only 32,000 records away from being the best-selling album of the year. The Massacre included the hit single, "Candy Shop," which debuted at number 1 on the Billboard Hot 100. As of 2025, the album has been certified sextuple platinum in America, with sales in America reaching six million copies. It has sold over nine million copies worldwide. On the album's song "Piggy Bank", a song off the album, 50 Cent insulted several artists, including Jadakiss. The feud between Jadakiss and 50 Cent indirectly led to DJ Green Lantern leaving Shady Records. A few months after the release of The Massacre, Jadakiss appeared on a street DVD, and had DJ Green Lantern on loudspeaker through his phone, without Green Lantern being aware of this. The DJ shared his thoughts on how to deal with the feud. When the DVD was released and Eminem found out about what happened, Green Lantern had to leave Shady Records and Shade 45, and his upcoming album, Armageddon, was no longer a Shady Records-related project. The Alchemist was signed on as the official tour DJ for Eminem on the 2005 Anger Management 3 Tour, replacing the recently ousted DJ Green Lantern.

In August 2005, Eminem and the XXL magazine teamed up to release a special issue titled XXL Presents Shade 45, and was designed to give maximum exposure to Shade 45 as a radio station, and at the same time give maximum exposure to the Shady Records label as a whole, as well as the radio DJ's and G-Unit Records' artists. XXL executive publisher, Jonathan Rheingold, stated that typically magazines based around particular artists were not favorable, but "since Shade 45 is a truly authentic and uncensored rap radio channel, the marriage with the XXL brand made sense," before adding that it is what would interest rap fans. September 2005 also saw the signing of Bobby Creekwater to the label, making him the fifth artist and the second Atlanta-based rapper.

In March 2006, Chicago-born Orange County, California-based rapper named Cashis joined Shady Records, after he managed to get his demo heard by Eminem. Later in 2006, Obie Trice released his second album, Second Round's on Me. However, the album did not fare as well commercially as his debut, seemingly because of the state of the hip-hop industry. The album saw a change in Obie Trice's style, whose first album was considered to be a little light-hearted. Second Round's on Me was considered to be a more serious, dark album, mainly showing the grittiness of Obie Trice's life and surroundings.

In early 2006, there had been talk of Eminem having the label's roster on a mixtape with new material to be presented by DJ Whoo Kid and The Alchemist. This talk went on for several months. In the end, it was announced that Eminem was so impressed with the mixtape material that he had decided to make it an official album, called Eminem Presents the Re-Up. The album had been long anticipated, until it was released in early December 2006. The release had spawned the single "You Don't Know", which featured 50 Cent, Lloyd Banks, and the latest signee Cashis.

In May 2007, Cashis released the eight-track The County Hound EP in an attempt to have people "fiend" for his music, or garner interest in it. The album was released as a limited edition EP. September saw the release of 50 Cent's third album with the label, Curtis, which was involved in a well publicized competition with rapper Kanye West, who had his third album, Graduation set for release on the same day. In June 2008, Obie Trice departed from the label. A misunderstanding was made where it was believed he was attacking the label and Eminem on a single titled "The Giant" but they were quickly dismissed. In a statement, Paul Rosenberg stated "Shady Records has agreed to allow Obie Trice to pursue his craft in a different forum free from the constraints of the current major label model [...] Eminem will continue to support and work with Obie on many levels of his career [...] He remains a close friend and member of the Shady family." In a 2012 interview, Obie opened up on the topic, admitting having issues with Interscope Records chairman Jimmy Iovine, which was Trice's fault, clarifying "I was kind of reckless, not on time, certain things and [Iovine] didn't want to further the project with me so we tried to work it out but it just didn’t come to a head so I had to do what I had to do," before going on to note that his relationship with the label is great, and he continues to work with Eminem, notably on Bottoms Up, which was to be released originally on Shady Records.

Stat Quo was also released from the label in 2008. Stat felt the root cause appeared to him to be a straining relationship with Eminem stemming from differences relating to the promotion of the album. HipHopDX detailed the events following this point in the situation leading to his release from the label with "Eminem's decision to remove himself from Stat's project, a subsequent, and unexplained, decision made by Dr. Dre to not appear in Stat's video for "Here We Go," and the aforementioned lack of support for the single by parent label, Interscope, Stat began seeking his release from the label." 2009 saw the departure of Bobby Creekwater who had been working on his debut album, A Brilliant Mistake.

=== 2010–2016: Shady 2.0 and Shady XV ===
Slaughterhouse guest featured Eminem's seventh album Recovery on the bonus track "Session One". On January 12, 2011, Slaughterhouse and Yelawolf appeared on the cover of the XXL magazine with Eminem, then was confirmed that both acts were signed to Shady Records. On March 2, 2011, a track called "2.0 Boys" performed by Eminem, Slaughterhouse and Yelawolf surfaced.

Slaughterhouse, it's kinda phase two of Shady. The new generation of Shady Records. And as we're trying to rebuild our label. But it's exciting for hip-hop [...] Everybody here, as an MC, is competitive. And I think, Yelawolf being in the family, the Shady family, it's gonna make him hear what these guys are doin' and wanna step his own shit up. When I hear these guys, I wanna step my shit up. And when they hear each other, I think it'll be a competitive atmosphere, like, makin' these records. And that's better for hip-hop.

— Eminem, XXL

On April 25, 2011, Eminem and Royce da 5'9" announced plans to team up for a joint EP, slated for release on June 14. The project served as a long-awaited follow-up to their 1999 collaboration "Nuttin' to Do", and featured production from Mr. Porter, Havoc of Mobb Deep, Bangladesh and more. "Royce and I started hanging out again and inevitably that led us back into the studio", said Eminem in a statement. "At first we were just seeing where it went without any real goal in mind, but the songs started to come together crazy, so here we are." Royce also talked about it, and said: "I'm excited to see this project come to fruition considering the long lapse in time between when we worked before and now. We had a blast doing it and we just hope everyone enjoys it while we're working on the 'Monster' that will be the Slaughterhouse album."

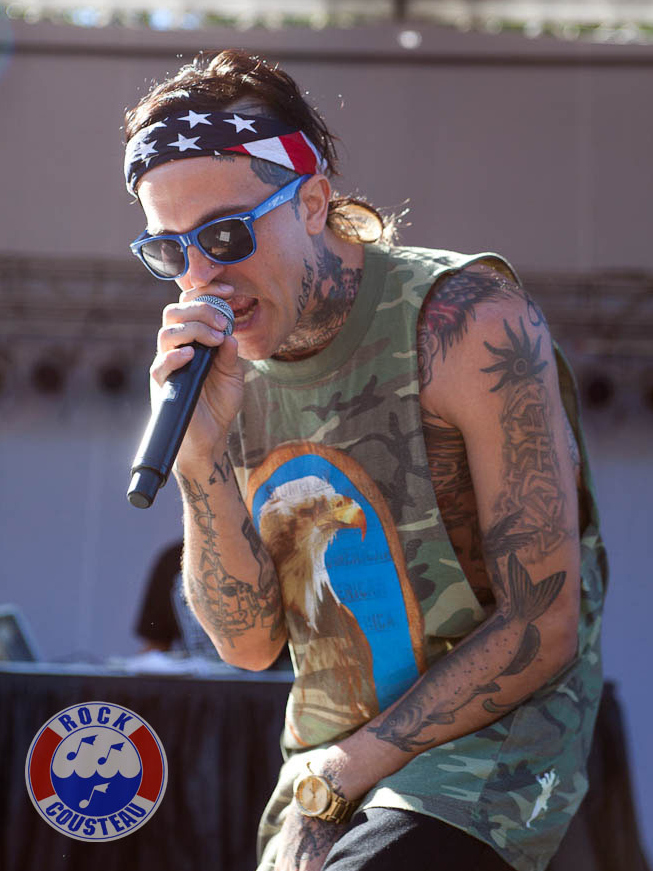
Eminem signed rapper Yelawolf to the label in 2011.

In October 2011, Yelawolf and Slaughterhouse, along with Eminem, freestyled over East Flatbush Project's "Tried by 12" on a DJ Premier-hosted BET Cypher segment at the 2011 BET Hip Hop Awards. Becoming referred to as the "Shady 2.0 BET Cypher", it was considered to be a fan favorite segment of the cipher sessions presented throughout the awards show, with talk spreading across many online social media outlets, and Twitter having popularised trends relating with the terms "#Cypher" and "#Shady 2.0" as it was airing.

The label showcased acts at the 2012 SXSW festival on March 16, 2012, at the Austin Music Hall. The evening was presented by Shade 45 radio host Sway Calloway, the Shady Records artist line up for the evening included Slaughterhouse and 50 Cent, who performed his début album Get Rich or Die Tryin' in its entirety for the first time. Yelawolf was also scheduled to perform but couldn't due to a spleen injury earlier that month.

On March 20, 50 Cent announced that his 50 Cent's fifth studio album would be released on July 2, 2012. This was later delayed to November 13, 2012. Another delay was announced, pushing the release back to January 2013. On March 29, 2012, Yelawolf announced his second release under Shady, tentatively titled Love Story. On May 24, 2012, Eminem announced his eighth studio album, The Marshall Mathers LP 2, which was then released on November 5, 2013.

When speaking about all future Shady Records releases president Paul Rosenberg said that Eminem's next album would be released post-Memorial Day 2013 and to expect new music from it soon. He also went on to discuss the other acts saying 50 Cent's Street King Immortal would be released in the first half of 2013, with Yelawolf's second album, Love Story, currently being recorded. Rosenberg would also state that all four members of Slaughterhouse would release solo projects prior to them returning to the studio as a group to record their second album under Shady Records. The first album released would be Joe Budden's No Love Lost on February 5, 2013, under E1 Music. The second would be Kxng Crooked's Apex Predator released under Treacherous C.O.B and Empire Distribution. However, Royce and Joell Ortiz of Slaughterhouse would confirm in May 2013 that they had put their solo projects on hold, and had begun working on their third studio album.

On February 20, 2014, 50 Cent announced he left Interscope Records, which included his deal with Shady Records and Aftermath Entertainment, in which he is now signed to Caroline Records.

On August 25, 2014, a press release on Eminem's official website announced an upcoming compilation album by Shady Records, titled Shady XV. The two-disc album released on November 24, 2014, in the week of Black Friday and consisted of one greatest hits disc and one disc of new material from Shady Records artists such as D12, Slaughterhouse, Bad Meets Evil, and Yelawolf. On the same day, August 25, 2014, the first single from the album, titled "Guts Over Fear" and featuring singer-songwriter Sia, was released.

=== 2017–present: Third generation and the disbandment of Slaughterhouse ===
On March 3, 2017, Shady Records and Griselda Records announced that Shady Records had signed Westside Gunn and Conway the Machine to the label both individually and collectively. Following the 2017 BET Hip-Hop Awards on October 11, 2017, Shady Records announced that they had signed Compton rapper Boogie.

The signings of these artists has led to Shady's profitability again, with the releases of Yelawolf's Trial by Fire and Eminem's Revival. The latter would suddenly release his tenth studio album Kamikaze without any prior promotion.

During the transition, Royce da 5'9" announced that Slaughterhouse had officially disbanded, while Eminem formally retired from D12 after Proof's death in 2006 (however Bizarre, Kuniva, and Swifty McVay continued to perform under the name), and Yelawolf left the label after releasing Trunk Muzik 3.

In 2019, Boogie released his debut album Everything's for Sale, and Griselda released their first album on the label, WWCD, both meeting critical acclaim.

On January 17, 2020, Eminem released his eleventh studio album Music to Be Murdered By without any prior announcement. Commercially, it debuted at number one in 12 countries. In the United States, the album sold 279,000 in its first week becoming Eminem's tenth consecutive number-one album in the country. Eminem became the only artist with ten consecutive number-one albums in the United States and United Kingdom. Both Griselda and Westside Gunn left the label the same year.

On July 2, 2021, it was announced that Atlanta rapper Grip had signed to the label, and later released his debut Shady album, I Died for This!?.

On February 25, 2022, Conway the Machine released his second studio album, God Don't Make Mistakes, and on June 17, 2022, Westside Boogie released More Black Superheroes. God Don't Make Mistakes was his final album before signing off with Shady. That same year, Eminem released his second greatest hits album, Curtain Call 2, following his 2005 compilation album Curtain Call: The Hits.

On July 27, 2023, Eminem announced the signing of Ez Mil to Shady and Aftermath, and announced a collaboration titled "Realest", and later a reissue of Du4li7y.

On May 31, 2024, Eminem came back from hiatus to release "Houdini", the leading single of his upcoming album, The Death of Slim Shady (Coup de Grâce), which was released on July 12, 2024.

On November 13, 2026, British-American rapper IDK released the song "Welcome", which features a hook from Eminem and production from the late J Dilla. On the same date, IDK's signing to Shady and Interscope Records was announced.

== Artists ==
=== Current acts ===
Act	Year signed	Releases with the label
Eminem	1999; Founder	12
Westside Boogie	2017	2
Ez Mil	2023	1
IDK	2026	—

=== Former acts ===
Act	Years on the label	Releases with the label
D12	2000–2018	2
Obie Trice	2000–2008	2
50 Cent	2002–2014	5
DJ Green Lantern	2002–2005	3
Stat Quo	2003–2008	1
Bobby Creekwater	2005–2009	1
Cashis	2006–2011	1
Bad Meets Evil	2011–2015	1
Slaughterhouse	2011–2018	3
Yelawolf	2011–2019	6
Griselda	2017–2020	1
Westside Gunn	2017–2020	1
Conway the Machine	2017–2022	1
Grip	2021–2025	3

== Discography ==
The following is the list of all albums released through Shady Records and distributed by Interscope Records. Any additional record label involved are specified.

=== Studio albums ===
Artist	Album	Details
D12	Devil's Night (Note: An expanded edition of the album was released on June 18, 2021.)	Released: June 19, 2001; Chart position: #1 U.S.; RIAA certification: Platinum
Eminem	The Eminem Show (Note: An expanded edition of the album was released on May 26, 2022.) (released with Aftermath)	Released: May 26, 2002; Chart positions: #1 U.S.; RIAA certification: Diamond
50 Cent	Get Rich or Die Tryin' (released with Aftermath)	Released: February 6, 2003; Chart position: #1 U.S.; RIAA certification: 9× Platinum
Obie Trice	Cheers	Released: September 23, 2003; Chart position: #5 U.S.; RIAA certification: Gold
D12	D12 World	Released: April 27, 2004; Chart position: #1 U.S.; RIAA certification: 2× Platinum
Eminem	Encore (released with Aftermath)	Released: November 12, 2004; Chart positions: #1 U.S.; RIAA certification: 5× Platinum
50 Cent	The Massacre (Note: A special edition of the album was released on September 6, 2005.) (released with Aftermath)	Released: March 3, 2005; Chart position: #1 U.S.; RIAA certification: 6× Platinum
Obie Trice	Second Round's on Me	Released: August 15, 2006; Chart position: #8 U.S.; RIAA certification: —
50 Cent	Curtis (released with Aftermath)	Released: September 11, 2007; Chart position: #2 U.S.; RIAA certification: Platinum
Eminem	Relapse (Note: A deluxe edition of the album, titled Relapse: Refill, was released on December 21, 2009.) (released with Aftermath)	Released: May 19, 2009; Chart positions: #1 U.S.; RIAA certification: 3× Platinum
50 Cent	Before I Self Destruct (released with Aftermath)	Released: November 9, 2009; Chart position: #5 U.S.; RIAA certification: Gold
Eminem	Recovery (released with Aftermath)	Released: June 18, 2010; Chart positions: #1 U.S.; RIAA certification: 8× Platinum
Yelawolf	Radioactive	Released: November 21, 2011; Chart position: #27 U.S.; RIAA certification: —
Slaughterhouse	Welcome to: Our House	Released: August 28, 2012; Chart position: #2 U.S.; RIAA certification: —
Eminem	The Marshall Mathers LP 2 (Note: An expanded edition of the album was released on November 3, 2023.) (released with Aftermath)	Released: November 5, 2013; Chart positions: #1 U.S.; RIAA certification: 4× Platinum
Yelawolf	Love Story (released with Slumerican)	Released: April 21, 2015; Chart positions: #3 U.S.; RIAA certification: Gold
Yelawolf	Trial by Fire (released with Slumerican)	Released: October 27, 2017; Chart positions: #42 U.S.; RIAA certification: —
Eminem	Revival (released with Aftermath)	Released: December 15, 2017; Chart positions: #1 U.S.; RIAA certification: Platinum
Eminem	Kamikaze (released with Aftermath)	Released: August 31, 2018; Chart positions: #1 U.S.; RIAA certification: Platinum
Westside Boogie	Everythings for Sale	Released: January 25, 2019; Chart positions: #28 U.S.; RIAA certification: —
Yelawolf	Trunk Muzik 3 (released with Slumerican)	Released: March 29, 2019; Chart positions: #28 U.S.; RIAA certification: —
Eminem	Music to Be Murdered By (Note: A deluxe edition of the album, titled Music to Be Murdered By – Side B, was released on December 18, 2020.) (released with Aftermath)	Released: January 17, 2020; Chart positions: #1 U.S.; RIAA certification: Platinum
Eminem	The Death of Slim Shady (Coup de Grâce) (released with Aftermath)	Released: July 12, 2024; Chart positions: #1 U.S.; RIAA certification: —

=== Compilation albums ===
Artist	Album	Details
Various Artists	8 Mile (Note: An expanded edition of the album was released on October 28, 2022.)	Released: October 29, 2002; Chart position: #1 U.S.; RIAA certification: 6× Platinum
Eminem	Curtain Call: The Hits (released with Aftermath)	Released: December 6, 2005; Chart positions: #1 U.S.; RIAA certification: Diamond
Various Artists	Eminem Presents: The Re-Up	Released: December 5, 2006; Chart position: #2 U.S.; RIAA certification: Platinum
Various Artists	Shady XV	Released: November 24, 2014; Chart positions: #3 U.S.; RIAA certification: Gold
Various Artists	Southpaw	Released: July 24, 2015; Chart positions: #5 U.S.; RIAA certification: —
50 Cent	Best of 50 Cent (released with Aftermath)	Released: March 31, 2017; Chart position: #119 U.S.; RIAA certification: —
Eminem	Curtain Call 2 (released with Aftermath)	Released: August 5, 2022; Chart positions: #6 U.S.; RIAA certification: —

=== Extended plays ===
Artist	Album	Details
Cashis	The County Hound EP	Released: May 22, 2007; Chart position: #106 U.S.; RIAA certification: —
Bad Meets Evil	Hell: The Sequel	Released: June 14, 2011; Chart position: #1 U.S.; RIAA certification: Gold

=== Digital albums, compilations, extended plays and mixtapes ===
Artist	Album	Details
DJ Green Lantern	Invasion Part I: Shady Times	Released: November 21, 2002
DJ Green Lantern	Invasion Part II: Conspiracy Theory	Released: April 15, 2003
DJ Green Lantern	Invasion Part III: Countdown to Armageddon	Released: January 14, 2004
Stat Quo	Underground Atlanta Volume 4: The Prequel to Statlanta	Released: August 10, 2006
Bobby Creekwater	Anthem 2 Da Streets II	Released: January 28, 2007
Slaughterhouse	On the House	Released: August 19, 2012
Yelawolf	Trunk Muzik Returns	Released: March 14, 2013
Yelawolf	Black Fall	Released: October 31, 2013
Slaughterhouse	House Rules	Released: May 21, 2014
Griselda	WWCD	Released: November 29, 2019
Westside Gunn	Who Made the Sunshine	Released: October 2, 2020
Grip	I Died for This!?	Released: August 27, 2021
Conway the Machine	God Don't Make Mistakes	Released: February 25, 2022; Chart positions: #175 U.S.
Westside Boogie	More Black Superheroes (Note: A limited edition of the album was released on November 17, 2022.)	Released: June 17, 2022
Grip	5 & A Fuck You	Released: October 4, 2022
Grip	Still (5 & A Fuck You)	Released: July 7, 2023
Ez Mil	Du4li7y: Redux	Released: August 11, 2023
Eminem	Stans	Released: August 26, 2025
