= Bass Brothers production discography =

List of songs produced by the Bass Brothers

This is a list of all of the songs that F.B.T. Productions has produced, including songs for Eminem, George Clinton, D12, King Gordy and others.

== 1984 ==
=== Dreamboy - Dreamboy ===
- "Don't Go"
- "I Promise (I Do Love You)"

== 1995 ==
=== Soul Intent - Fuckin' Backstabber ===
- Whole album

== 1996 ==
=== Eminem - Infinite ===
- Whole album

== 1997 ==
=== Eminem - Slim Shady EP ===
- Whole album

== 1999 ==
=== Eminem - The Slim Shady LP ===
- "Public Service Announcement"
- "Brain Damage"
- "If I Had"
- "'97 Bonnie & Clyde"
- "My Fault"
- "Cum on Everybody"
- "Rock Bottom"
- "Just Don't Give a Fuck"
- "As the World Turns"
- "I'm Shady"
- "Bad Meets Evil"
- "Still Don't Give a Fuck"

== 2000 ==
=== Eminem - The Marshall Mathers LP ===
- "Public Service Announcement 2000"
- "Marshall Mathers"
- "Drug Ballad"
- "Amityville"
- "Kim"
- "Under the Influence"
- "Criminal"
- "The Kids"

== 2001 ==
=== D12 - Devil's Night ===
- "Another Public Service Announcement"
- "American Psycho"
- "Purple Pills"
- "Instigator"
- "Pimp Like Me"
- "Blow My Buzz"
- "Devils Night"
- "These Drugs"

== 2002 ==
=== Eminem - The Eminem Show ===
- "White America"
- "Square Dance"
- "Cleanin' Out My Closet"
- "Without Me"
- "Sing for the Moment"
- "Superman"

=== Various artists - 8 Mile ===
- "Lose Yourself"

== 2003 ==
=== King Gordy - The Entity ===
- "Nightmares"
- "The Pain"
- "Fight"
- "When Darkness Falls"
- "Pass Me A Lighter"
- "No Lights"
- "We Violent"
- "Stress"

== 2005 ==
=== Bizarre - Hannicap Circus ===
- "Public Service Announcement (Skit)" (featuring Jeff Bass)

=== Tony Yayo - Thoughts of a Predicate Felon ===
- "Drama Setter" (featuring Eminem and Obie Trice)

== 2007 ==
=== T.I. - T.I. vs. T.I.P. ===
- "Touchdown"

== 2008 ==
=== George Clinton - George Clinton and His Gangsters of Love ===
- Whole album

== 2009 ==
=== Eminem - Relapse ===
- "Beautiful"
