= Business (song) =

2003 single by Eminem

Single by Eminem

from the album The Eminem Show
- Released: July 22, 2003
- Recorded: January – April 2002
- Genre: Hip hop; comedy hip hop
- Length: 4:11
- Label: Aftermath; Shady; Interscope
- Songwriters: Marshall Mathers; Andre Young; Theron Feemster; Mike Elizondo
- Producer: Dr. Dre

Eminem singles chronology
"Sing for the Moment" (2003)	"Business" (2003)	"Just Lose It" (2004)

"Business" is a song by American rapper Eminem from his fourth studio album, The Eminem Show (2002). "Business" was released as the fifth and final single from the album on July 22, 2003, exclusively to international markets, but it was not released as an official single in the United States.

== Composition and reception ==
"Business" is a hip-hop song of four minutes and eleven seconds in length. It sees Eminem comparing himself and Dr. Dre, the song's producer, to fictional crime-fighting duo Batman and Robin, a comparison first explored in the music video for the previous Eminem single "Without Me". The track is one of several Dr. Dre productions on The Eminem Show which, according to CultureDose writer Marty Brown, affords Eminem a "perfect sound-scape" to inspire emotions in the listener, calling the beat "a launchpad equally effective for humor or anger". Writing for Pitchfork Media, Ethan P. noted the "cartoonish" production to be similar in style to several of Eminem's early singles, claiming it to be fitting to the Batman and Robin theme on "Business", but noted that "this time he's actually talking about Batman and Robin!!". DX Magazine editor J-23 called this "classic" with Dre beats. Kris Ex On "Business": "Em names himself the gatekeeper of hip-hop and obliquely claims to be the best rapper alive: 'The flow's too wet/Nobody close to it/Nobody says it, but still everybody knows the shit.'"

== Track listing ==
UK CD1

No.	Title	Writer(s)	Producer(s)	Length
1.	"Business"	Marshall Mathers; Andre Young; Theron Feemster; Mike Elizondo	Dr. Dre	4:20
2.	"Bump Heads" (DJ Green Lantern version) (featuring G-Unit)	Marshall Mathers; Curtis Jackson; Christopher Lloyd; Marvin Bernard	Eminem	4:36
3.	"Business" (live in Barcelona – video)	Mathers; Young; Feemster; Elizondo	Dr. Dre	4:20
Total length:				13:16

UK CD2

No.	Title	Writer(s)	Producer(s)	Length
1.	"Business"	Marshall Mathers; Andre Young; Theron Feemster; Mike Elizondo	Dr. Dre	4:20
2.	"The Conspiracy" (DJ Green Lantern version) (freestyle)			5:14
3.	"Business" (live in Detroit – video)	Mathers; Young; Feemster; Elizondo	Dr. Dre	4:20
Total length:				13:54

- UK Cassette

No.	Title	Writer(s)	Producer(s)	Length
1.	"Business"	Marshall Mathers; Andre Young; Theron Feemster; Mike Elizondo	Dr. Dre	4:20
2.	"Bump Heads" (DJ Green Lantern version) (featuring G-Unit)	Marshall Mathers; Curtis Jackson; Christopher Lloyd; Marvin Bernard	Eminem	4:36
3.	"The Conspiracy" (DJ Green Lantern version) (freestyle)			5:14
Total length:				14:10

German CD single

No.	Title	Writer(s)	Producer(s)	Length
1.	"Business"	Marshall Mathers; Andre Young; Theron Feemster; Mike Elizondo	Dr. Dre	4:20
2.	"The Conspiracy" (DJ Green Lantern version) (freestyle)			5:14
3.	"Business" (instrumental)	Mathers; Young; Feemster; Elizondo	Dr. Dre	4:20
4.	"Business" (live in Detroit – video)	Mathers; Young; Feemster; Elizondo	Dr. Dre	4:20
Total length:				18:14

Australian CD single

No.	Title	Writer(s)	Producer(s)	Length
1.	"Business"	Marshall Mathers; Andre Young; Theron Feemster; Mike Elizondo	Dr. Dre	4:20
2.	"Bump Heads" (DJ Green Lantern version) (featuring G-Unit)	Marshall Mathers; Curtis Jackson; Christopher Lloyd; Marvin Bernard	Eminem	4:36
3.	"Business" (live in Detroit – video)	Mathers; Young; Feemster; Elizondo	Dr. Dre	4:20
Total length:				13:16

German 3" CD single

No.	Title	Writer(s)	Producer(s)	Length
1.	"Business"	Marshall Mathers; Andre Young; Theron Feemster; Mike Elizondo	Dr. Dre	4:20
2.	"The Conspiracy" (DJ Green Lantern version) (freestyle)			5:14
Total length:				9:34

The Singles version

No.	Title	Writer(s)	Producer(s)	Length
1.	"Business"	Marshall Mathers; Andre Young; Theron Feemster; Mike Elizondo	Dr. Dre	4:20
2.	"Bump Heads" (DJ Green Lantern version) (featuring G-Unit)	Marshall Mathers; Curtis Jackson; Christopher Lloyd; Marvin Bernard	Eminem	4:36
3.	"Business" (acappella)	Mathers; Young; Feemster; Elizondo	Dr. Dre	4:17
4.	"Business" (live in Barcelona – video)	Mathers; Young; Feemster; Elizondo	Dr. Dre	4:20
Total length:				17:33

== Charts ==
=== Weekly charts ===
Chart (2002–03)	Peak position
Australia (ARIA)	4
Austria (Ö3 Austria Top 40)	22
Belgium (Ultratop 50 Flanders)	28
Belgium Dance (Ultratop Flanders)	11
Belgium (Ultratop 50 Wallonia)	30
Belgium Dance (Ultratop Wallonia)	11
Germany (GfK)	15
Ireland (IRMA)	7
Netherlands (Dutch Top 40)	9
Netherlands (Single Top 100)	6
New Zealand (Recorded Music NZ)	14
Scottish Singles Sales (Official Charts)	6
UK Singles (Official Charts)	6
UK Hip Hop/R&B (Official Charts)	1
US Hot R&B/Hip-Hop Songs (Billboard)	77
US Hot Rap Songs (Billboard)	25

=== Year-end charts ===
Chart (2003)	Position
Australia (ARIA)	66
Germany (Official German Charts)	98
Netherlands (Single Top 100)	100
UK Singles (OCC)	132

== Certifications ==
Region	Certification	Certified units/sales
Australia (ARIA)	2× Platinum	140,000^{‡}
United Kingdom (BPI)	Gold	400,000^{‡}
United States (RIAA)	Gold	500,000^{‡}
^{‡} Sales+streaming figures based on certification alone.

== In popular culture ==
The song was used in the 2022 San Diego Comic-Con trailer of the film Shazam! Fury of the Gods.
