= Cleanin' Out My Closet =

2002 single by Eminem

Single by Eminem

from the album The Eminem Show
- Released: July 29, 2002
- Recorded: March 2001
- Genre: Hardcore hip-hop; rap rock
- Length: 4:57 (album version); 5:42 (instrumental version)
- Label: Aftermath; Shady; Interscope
- Songwriter: Eminem
- Producers: Eminem; Jeff Bass

Eminem singles chronology
"Without Me" (2002)	"Cleanin' Out My Closet" (2002)	"Lose Yourself" (2002)

Music video
- "Cleanin' Out My Closet" on YouTube

"Cleanin' Out My Closet" is a song by American rapper Eminem from his album The Eminem Show (2002). It was the second single released off the album following "Without Me" on July 29, 2002. Unlike the preceding single which was as his humorous Slim Shady persona, "Cleanin' Out My Closet" is an autobiographical song inspired by the events of Eminem's childhood and relationships. It depicts Eminem venting his anger towards his mother, Debbie Mathers, for the way she raised him. In the chorus, Eminem apologizes to his mother for hurting her and making her cry, while describing his mother to his listeners across the world.

It became the second top-ten single from the album, reaching number four on the U.S. Billboard Hot 100, and one of the highest-charting singles of his career. It was certified Platinum in Australia. The song was also used in the initial theatrical trailer to Eminem's film 8 Mile, released on November 8, 2002, but was not included on the film's soundtrack. It was included in the compilation Curtain Call: The Hits.

== Background ==
"Cleanin' Out My Closet" was the second song Eminem wrote for the album. The instrumental for "Cleanin' Out My Closet" was created by Eminem during the making of D12's debut studio album, Devil's Night. According to group member Kuniva, Bizarre was on the song first, but was talking "crazy" on the record and was encouraged to tone it down. Despite receiving the approval of Dr. Dre, Bizarre decided to pass on the record, and Eminem picked it up from there: "The whole group was like 'Yo, you can't say this shit. It's too much.' So, he got a call from Dr. Dre. And Dre was like 'Say that shit, man. You gotta say it.' [...] He ultimately gave into the group and was like 'You know what? Fuck it, man.'"

== Composition ==
"Cleanin' Out My Closet" is a hardcore hip-hop and rap rock song written and produced by Eminem and Jeff Bass, the latter of whom provided the guitars, bass, and keyboards. The song's drum programming was handled by DJ Head. At the beginning of the song, after the music begins to play, Eminem asks "Where's my snare? I have no snare in my headphones." Eminem explained that this actually happened; the recording engineer had muted the snare drums in his headphones during the recording of the song. During the editing process, Eminem chose to leave it in.

In the song's first verse, Eminem criticizes his mother. The second verse then moves on to how his father abandoned him and his mother did drugs. At the start of the third verse, Eminem states that his comments regarding his mother are not made for the sake of public attention.

== Critical reception ==
AllMusic highlighted this song. David Browne was lukewarm: "The unhealed scars of his childhood are pored over in Cleanin' Out My Closet: In the chorus, he apologizes for making his mama cry, but in the verses, he lashes out at her (you selfish bitch) and vows to be a better dad than his own absentee father (I wonder if he even kissed me goodbye). The song is both fragile and furious, and the syncopated music-box arrangement matches it in tension." J-23 was positive: "Cleanin' Out My Closet" features the album's most personal rhymes as he lets us know just how he feels about his parents. His third verse, dealing with his mother, is truly something to behold." NME also praised the single: "Cleanin' Out My Closet", a stunning outpouring of grief-stricken anger against his mother." RapReviews agreed: "The jokes don't last very long though, because Eminem's next song "Cleanin' Out My Closet" is a direct attack on his mother for not really being one." Rolling Stone praised the song's production: "Cleanin' Out My Closet" feature electric-guitar rhythms fraternizing with hip-hop-sensible drum patterns" and he noted that his (Eminem's) relationship with his estranged mother creates "Cleanin' Out My Closet," possibly the record's most powerful moment."

== Personnel ==
All personnel taken from Tidal

- Eminem – vocals
- Jeff Bass – bass guitar, guitar, keyboards
- DJ Head – drum programming
- Ross Halfin – cover photography

== Remixes and mashups ==
Two remixes of the song feature as European bonus tracks on the Straight from the Lab mixtape later released as a compilation: a Drum and bass remix (which was produced by DJ Green Lantern) and a remix combining the song with "God Is a Girl" by Groove Coverage entitled "(God Is) Cleanin' Out My Closet."

The B side "Stimulate" appears on the deluxe edition bonus disc of the soundtrack Music from and Inspired by the Motion Picture: 8 Mile, and also appears on Straight from the Lab.

The song was mashed up with "Hotel California" by The Eagles, which appears on DJ Vlad and Roc Raida's mashup mixtape, Rock Phenomenon.

Jon Connor's 2012 mixtape The People's Rapper LP included a remix of the song, as well as other Eminem remixes.

== Cover versions ==
In October 2012, New York City hip-hop artist Angel Haze released a reworked version of "Cleanin' Out My Closet" using their own lyrics, in which they graphically recount their experience with child sexual abuse.

== Apology song ==
Eminem's 2013 album, The Marshall Mathers LP 2, featured a song titled "Headlights" which serves as an apology to Eminem's mother for things he said about her in his songs, "Cleanin' Out My Closet" being the only song mentioned by name. The music video, directed by Academy Award-winning director Spike Lee, shows Eminem's rise to fame through his mother's eyes. In the song, Eminem says he no longer plays "Cleanin' Out my Closet" at shows – with the song last being played at Leeds Festival in England on August 25 – and says he cringes every time he hears it on the radio.

== Awards and nominations ==
Year	Ceremony	Award	Result
2003	MuchMusic Video Awards	Best international video - artist	Nominated

== Track listing ==
Digital download

No.	Title	Writer(s)	Producer(s)	Length
1.	"Cleanin' Out My Closet"	Marshall Mathers; Jeffrey Bass	Eminem; Jeff Bass	4:57
2.	"Cleanin' Out My Closet" (instrumental)	Mathers; Bass	Eminem; Bass	4:57
3.	"Stimulate"	Mathers	Eminem	5:06
Total length:				15:00

UK CD single

No.	Title	Writer(s)	Producer(s)	Length
1.	"Cleanin' Out My Closet"	Marshall Mathers; Jeffrey Bass	Eminem; Jeff Bass	4:57
2.	"Cleanin' Out My Closet" (instrumental)	Mathers; Bass	Eminem; Bass	4:57
3.	"Stimulate"	Mathers	Eminem	5:06
4.	"Cleanin' Out My Closet" (video)	Mathers; Bass	Eminem; Bass	4:57
Total length:				19:57

UK Cassette

No.	Title	Writer(s)	Producer(s)	Length
1.	"Cleanin' Out My Closet"	Marshall Mathers; Jeffrey Bass	Eminem; Jeff Bass	4:57
2.	"Stimulate"	Mathers	Eminem	5:06
Total length:				10:03

UK DVD

No.	Title	Writer(s)	Producer(s)	Length
1.	"Cleanin' Out My Closet" (video – version 2)	Marshall Mathers; Jeffrey Bass	Eminem; Jeff Bass	4:57
2.	"Cleanin' Out My Closet" (making of the video)			3:00
Total length:				8:57

German CD single

No.	Title	Writer(s)	Producer(s)	Length
1.	"Cleanin' Out My Closet" (video – version 2)	Marshall Mathers; Jeffrey Bass	Eminem; Jeff Bass	4:57
2.	"Stimulate"	Mathers	Eminem	5:06
Total length:				10:03

German CD single

No.	Title	Writer(s)	Producer(s)	Length
1.	"Cleanin' Out My Closet"	Marshall Mathers; Jeffrey Bass	Eminem; Jeff Bass	4:57
2.	"Stimulate"	Mathers	Eminem	5:06
3.	"Cleanin' Out My Closet" (instrumental)	Mathers; Bass	Eminem; Bass	4:57
4.	"Cleanin' Out My Closet" (video – version 1)	Mathers; Bass	Eminem; Bass	4:57
Total length:				19:57

Maxi #1 International Version

No.	Title	Writer(s)	Producer(s)	Length
1.	"Cleanin' Out My Closet" (album version) (explicit)	Marshall Mathers; Jeffrey Bass	Eminem; Jeff Bass	4:57
2.	"Stimulate" (non album version)	Mathers	Eminem	5:03
3.	"Cleanin' Out My Closet" (instrumental)	Mathers; Bass	Eminem; Bass	4:57
Total length:				15:00

== Charts ==
=== Weekly charts ===
Chart (2002–2003)	Peak position
Australia (ARIA)	3
Australian Urban (ARIA)	1
Austria (Ö3 Austria Top 40)	5
Belgium (Ultratop 50 Flanders)	6
Belgium (Ultratop 50 Wallonia)	10
Brazil (ABPD)	23
Czech Republic (IFPI)	22
Denmark (Tracklisten)	3
Europe (Eurochart Hot 100)	3
Finland (Suomen virallinen lista)	10
France (SNEP)	20
Germany (GfK)	4
Greece (IFPI)	8
Hungary (Single Top 40)	8
Ireland (IRMA)	3
Italy (FIMI)	8
Latvia (Latvian Airplay Top 50)	11
Netherlands (Dutch Top 40)	6
Netherlands (Single Top 100)	4
New Zealand (Recorded Music NZ)	5
Norway (VG-lista)	4
Romania (Romanian Top 100)	5
Scottish Singles Sales (Official Charts)	5
Spain (Promusicae)	8
Sweden (Sverigetopplistan)	3
Switzerland (Schweizer Hitparade)	5
UK Singles (Official Charts)	4
UK Hip Hop/R&B (Official Charts)	1
Uruguay (Notimex)	2
US Billboard Hot 100	4
US Hot Rap Songs (Billboard)	5
US Hot R&B/Hip-Hop Songs (Billboard)	11
US Pop Airplay (Billboard)	7
US Rhythmic Airplay (Billboard)	2

=== Year-end charts ===
Chart (2002)	Position
Australia (ARIA)	40
Australian Urban (ARIA)	13
Austria (Ö3 Austria Top 40)	46
Belgium (Ultratop Flanders)	42
Belgium (Ultratop Wallonia)	59
Europe (Eurochart Hot 100)	28
Germany (Official German Charts)	55
Netherlands (Dutch Top 40)	73
Netherlands (Single Top 100)	51
Sweden (Sverigetopplistan)	27
Switzerland (Schweizer Hitparade)	59
UK Singles (Official Charts Company)	94
US Billboard Hot 100	47
US Hot R&B/Hip-Hop Songs (Billboard)	77

== Certifications ==
Region	Certification	Certified units/sales
Australia (ARIA)	5× Platinum	350,000^{‡}
Belgium (BRMA)	Gold	25,000^{*}
Brazil (Pro-Música Brasil)	Gold	30,000^{‡}
Denmark (IFPI Danmark)	Gold	45,000^{‡}
Germany (BVMI)	Gold	300,000^{‡}
New Zealand (RMNZ)	2× Platinum	60,000^{‡}
Sweden (GLF)	Gold	15,000^{^}
United Kingdom (BPI)	Platinum	600,000^{‡}
United States (RIAA)	3× Platinum	3,000,000^{‡}
^{*} Sales figures based on certification alone.^{^} Shipments figures based on certification alone.^{‡} Sales+streaming figures based on certification alone.
