= Eminem albums discography =

Albums by Eminem

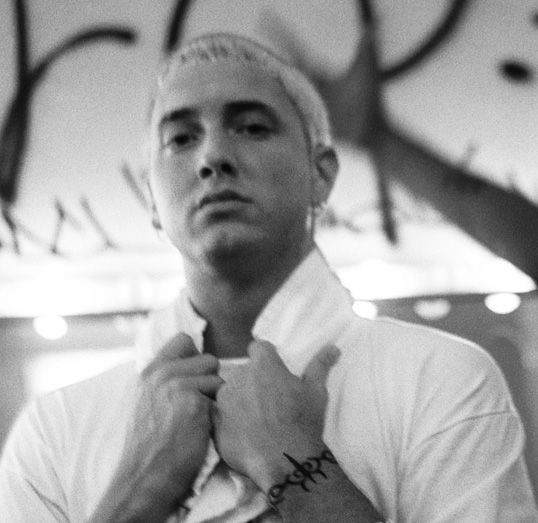
- Eminem in 1999
- Studio albums: 12
- Extended plays: 3
- Mixtapes: 6
- Soundtrack albums: 3
- Compilation albums: 2
- Collaborative albums: 2

American rapper Eminem has released 12 studio albums, two compilation albums, and two extended plays. His music has been released through record labels Interscope Records and Aftermath Entertainment, along with subsidiaries Web Entertainment and his own Shady Records. He has also worked with independent record label Bassmint Productions Eminem is the best-selling rapper of all time and the best-selling artist of the 2000s with US album sales at over 32.25 million during the decade. With sales of over 220 million records worldwide, he is among the best-selling music artists of all time. According to the Recording Industry Association of America, Eminem has sold 228.5 million certified albums and singles in the United States. In his home country, he has earned 50 platinum albums and 11 number one albums.^{[A]}

Eminem's debut album, Infinite, was released by Web Entertainment in 1996. It sold only around a thousand copies.

After signing a contract with Interscope Records and Aftermath Entertainment, the rapper released The Slim Shady LP in 1999, which debuted at number two on the Billboard 200, and was certified 5× platinum by the RIAA. In the same year, Eminem, along with manager Paul Rosenberg, founded the record label Shady Records.

In 2000, Eminem released his third album, The Marshall Mathers LP, which debuted at number one and sold 1.78 million copies in its first week, breaking records for the fastest-selling hip hop album of all time and the fastest-selling solo album in the United States. With more than ten million copies sold, the album was certified Diamond and was the third best-selling album of the year in the United States.

In 2002, Eminem's fourth album, The Eminem Show, also debuted at number one on the Billboard 200 and reached the top spot on various charts internationally, as it went on to sell 27 million copies worldwide. The Eminem Show was the best-selling album worldwide of 2002, with sales of over ten million copies. The album was certified Diamond in the United States, Canada and Australia. In the same year, Eminem released the 8 Mile soundtrack, also including songs by various artists. The album peaked at number one in the United States, where it sold more than four million of the nine million copies distributed internationally.

In 2004, Eminem's fifth album Encore became the rapper's third consecutive studio album to reach number one in the United States, Australia, Canada, New Zealand and United Kingdom. Sales, however, were significantly less than the two previous albums, with over five million sold copies in the United States and eleven million worldwide. Eminem released a greatest hits album titled Curtain Call: The Hits in 2005, which sold almost three million copies in the US. The following year, Shady Records released Eminem Presents: The Re-Up, a compilation album performed by Eminem along various artists from the record label. The album received a platinum certification from the RIAA in 2007 and sold slightly over a million copies in the United States.

After a hiatus of more than four years, Relapse, Eminem's sixth studio album, was released in 2009 and was the rapper's fourth consecutive studio album to top the charts in the United States, Australia, Canada, New Zealand and United Kingdom, with domestic sales of over two million copies. In the subsequent year, Eminem released his seventh studio album Recovery, which debuted at number one on the Billboard 200 and reached the top spot on various charts internationally. According to the International Federation of the Phonographic Industry, it was also the best-selling album of 2010 worldwide.

Eminem was named the best-selling artist in Canada in 2010 and 2013, when he released his eighth studio album The Marshall Mathers LP 2. The album was followed by Revival in 2017. Both The Marshall Mathers LP2 and Revival reached the top spot of the Billboard 200 in their first week, making Eminem the first music act to have eight entries in a row debut at the top of the Billboard chart.

In 2018, Eminem dropped an unannounced album overnight, which was his tenth album, Kamikaze, which was followed by another surprise album titled Music to Be Murdered By in 2020, both becoming his ninth and tenth consecutive albums to debut at number 1. A deluxe edition was released later in 2020, titled Music to Be Murdered By - Side B, which featured sixteen additional tracks. In 2022, Eminem's second greatest hits album Curtain Call 2 was released. In 2024, Eminem released his 12th studio album, The Death of Slim Shady (Coup de Grâce), becoming his eleventh number 1 album on the Billboard 200.

== Studio albums ==
Title	Album details	Peak chart positions										Sales	Certifications
Title	Album details	US	AUS	BEL	CAN	DEN	FRA	GER	NZ	SWI	UK	Sales	Certifications
Infinite	Released: November 12, 1996; Label: Web; Format: LP, cassette	—	—	—	—	—	—	—	—	—	—	US: 1,000	
The Slim Shady LP	Released: February 23, 1999; Label: Aftermath, Interscope, Web; Format: CD, LP, cassette, digital download, streaming	2	49	7^{[B]}	9	20	52	51	23	25^{[B]}	10	US: 7,340,000; UK: 1,100,000	RIAA: 5× Platinum; ARIA: 8× Platinum; BPI: 4× Platinum; IFPI SWI: Gold; MC: 2× Platinum; RMNZ: 2× Platinum
The Marshall Mathers LP	Released: May 23, 2000; Label: Aftermath, Interscope, Web; Format: CD, LP, cassette, digital download, streaming	1	1	1	1	1	2	3	1	2	1	WW: 25,000,000; US: 14,600,000; UK: 2,587,605	RIAA: 11× Platinum (Diamond); ARIA: 7× Platinum; BPI: 9× Platinum; BRMA: 2× Platinum; BVMI: 3× Platinum; IFPI DEN: 6× Platinum; IFPI SWI: 4× Platinum; MC: 8× Platinum; RMNZ: 5× Platinum; SNEP: 2× Platinum
The Eminem Show	Released: May 26, 2002; Label: Shady, Aftermath, Interscope, Web; Format: CD, LP, cassette, digital download, streaming	1	1	1	1	1	1	1	1	1	1	WW: 27,000,000; US: 16,170,000; UK: 1,800,000	RIAA: 12× Platinum (Diamond); ARIA: 19× Platinum; BPI: 7× Platinum; BRMA: Platinum; BVMI: 3× Platinum; IFPI DEN: 8× Platinum; IFPI SWI: 3× Platinum; MC: Diamond; RMNZ: 9× Platinum; SNEP: 2× Platinum
Encore	Released: November 12, 2004; Label: Shady, Aftermath, Interscope, Web; Format: CD, LP, cassette, digital download, streaming	1	1	2	1	2	1	1	1	1	1	WW: 11,000,000; US: 7,930,000; UK: 1,300,000	RIAA: 5× Platinum; ARIA: 8× Platinum; BPI: 4× Platinum; BRMA: Gold; BVMI: 3× Gold; IFPI DEN: 4× Platinum; IFPI SWI: Platinum; RMNZ: 6× Platinum; SNEP: 2× Gold
Relapse	Released: May 19, 2009 (Note: A reissue of the album, titled Relapse: Refill, was released on December 21, 2009.); Label: Shady, Aftermath, Interscope, Web; Format: CD, LP, digital download, streaming	1	1	1	1	1	1	2	1	2	1	US: 5,390,000; UK: 591,000	RIAA: 3× Platinum; ARIA: 2× Platinum; BPI: 2× Platinum; BRMA: Gold; BVMI: Gold; IFPI DEN: Gold; IFPI SWI: Platinum; RMNZ: 4× Platinum; SNEP: Gold
Recovery	Released: June 21, 2010; Label: Shady, Aftermath, Interscope, Web; Format: CD, LP, digital download, streaming	1	1	2	1	1	2	2	1	1	1	WW: 20,000,000; US: 10,170,000; CAN: 613,000; UK: 1,030,000	RIAA: 8× Platinum; ARIA: 5× Platinum; BPI: 4× Platinum; BRMA: Gold; BVMI: 3× Gold; IFPI DEN: 4× Platinum; IFPI SWI: Platinum; MC: Platinum; RMNZ: 4× Platinum; SNEP: Platinum
The Marshall Mathers LP 2	Released: November 5, 2013; Label: Shady, Aftermath, Interscope, Web; Format: CD, LP, digital download, streaming	1	1	1	1	3	2	1	1	1	1	US: 6,500,000; CAN: 365,000; FRA: 160,000; UK: 704,000	RIAA: 4× Platinum; ARIA: 3× Platinum; BPI: 3× Platinum; BRMA: Gold; BVMI: 3× Gold; IFPI DEN: Platinum; IFPI SWI: Platinum; MC: 4× Platinum; RMNZ: 5× Platinum; SNEP: Platinum
Revival	Released: December 15, 2017; Label: Shady, Aftermath, Interscope; Format: CD, LP, digital download, streaming	1	1	6	1	1	7	2	3	1	1	US: 1,500,000; UK: 321,000	RIAA: Platinum; ARIA: Platinum; BPI: Platinum; BVMI: Gold; IFPI DEN: Platinum; MC: Platinum; RMNZ: 2× Platinum; SNEP: Platinum
Kamikaze	Released: August 31, 2018; Label: Shady, Aftermath, Interscope; Format: CD, LP, cassette, digital download, streaming	1	1	1	1	1	3	2	1	1	1	US: 2,750,000; CAN: 152,000; UK: 319,730	RIAA: Platinum; ARIA: Platinum; BPI: Platinum; BVMI: Gold; IFPI DEN: Platinum; RMNZ: 2× Platinum; SNEP: Platinum
Music to Be Murdered By	Released: January 17, 2020 (Note: A deluxe edition of the album, titled Music to Be Murdered By – Side B, was released on December 18, 2020.); Label: Shady, Aftermath, Interscope; Format: CD, LP, cassette, digital download, streaming	1	1	1	1	1	4	2	1	1	1	WW: 4,000,000; US: 2,670,000; CAN: 174,000; UK: 110,000	RIAA: Platinum; ARIA: Gold; BPI: Platinum; BVMI: Gold; IFPI DEN: Platinum; MC: Platinum; RMNZ: 2× Platinum; SNEP: Gold
The Death of Slim Shady (Coup de Grâce)	Released: July 12, 2024; Label: Shady, Aftermath, Interscope; Format: CD, LP, cassette, digital download, streaming	1	1	1	1	2	2	2	1	1	1	US: 281,000 (first week); UK: 100,000	ARIA: Gold; BPI: Gold; BRMA: Gold; IFPI DEN: Gold; MC: Platinum; RMNZ: Platinum; SNEP: Gold

== Compilation albums ==
Title	Album details	Peak chart positions										Sales	Certifications
Title	Album details	US	AUS	BEL (FL)	CAN	FRA	GER	JPN	NZ	SWI	UK	Sales	Certifications
Curtain Call: The Hits	Greatest hits album; Released: December 6, 2005; Label: Shady, Aftermath, Interscope, Web; Format: CD, LP, cassette, digital download, streaming	1	1	10	1	141	7	3	1	5	1	US: 10,000,000; UK: 2,306,873	RIAA: Diamond; ARIA: 12× Platinum; BPI: 12× Platinum; BVMI: 3× Platinum; IFPI SWI: Gold; RIAJ: 2× Platinum; RMNZ: 7× Platinum; SNEP: 2× Gold
Curtain Call 2	Greatest hits album; Released: August 5, 2022; Label: Shady, Aftermath, Interscope; Format: CD, LP, cassette, digital download, streaming	6	2	15	3	16	9	—	5	8	3		BPI: 2× Platinum; RMNZ: 3× Platinum; SNEP: Gold

== Collaborative albums ==
Title	Album details	Peak chart positions										Sales	Certifications
Title	Album details	US	AUS	BEL (FL)	CAN	FRA	GER	JPN	NZ	SWI	UK	Sales	Certifications
Eminem Presents: The Re-Up (as Shady Records)	Various artists album; Released: December 5, 2006; Label: Shady, Interscope; Format: CD, LP, cassette, digital download, streaming	2	17	44	2	41	15	44	1	9	3^{[C]}	US: 1,051,000	RIAA: Platinum; ARIA: Platinum; BPI: Platinum; IFPI SWI: Gold; RMNZ: 2× Platinum
Shady XV (as Shady Records)	Two-disc album (one disc of greatest hits); Released: November 24, 2014; Label: Shady, Interscope; Format: CD, LP, digital download, streaming	3	—	26	1	32	8	—	—	7	5^{[C]}	US: 290,000	RIAA: Gold; BPI: Silver
"—" denotes a recording that did not chart or was not released in that territory.

== Soundtrack albums ==
Title	Album details	Peak chart positions									Sales	Certifications
Title	Album details	US	AUS	BEL (FL)	CAN	FRA	GER	NZ	SWI	UK	Sales	Certifications
8 Mile: Music from and Inspired by the Motion Picture (as Shady Records)	Released: October 29, 2002; Label: Shady, Interscope; Format: CD, cassette, digital download, streaming	1	1	6	1	6	1	1	3	1^{[C]}	US: 4,900,000; UK: 682,224	RIAA: 6× Platinum; ARIA: 4× Platinum; BPI: 2× Platinum; IFPI SWI: Platinum; MC: 5× Platinum; RMNZ: 4× Platinum; SNEP: Gold
Southpaw: Music from and Inspired by the Motion Picture (as Shady Records)	Released: July 24, 2015; Label: Shady, Interscope; Format: CD, LP, digital download, streaming	5	13	146	2	108	61	20	43	1 (Note: The reported peak chart position is indicative of the UK Soundtrack Albums Chart, as soundtracks and compilation albums by various artists are not eligible for the UK Albums Chart)	US: 91,000	
Stans (The Official Soundtrack)	Released: August 26, 2025; Label: Shady, Aftermath, Interscope; Format: LP, digital download, streaming	—	—	—	—	97	65	—	67	7 (Note: The reported peak chart position is indicative of the UK Soundtrack Albums Chart)		
"—" denotes a recording that did not chart or was not released in that territory.

== Reissued albums ==
Title	Album details
Relapse: Refill	Released: December 21, 2009; Label: Shady, Aftermath, Interscope, Web; Format: CD, digital download, streaming
Music to Be Murdered By – Side B	Released: December 18, 2020; Label: Shady, Aftermath, Interscope; Format: CD, LP, digital download, streaming

== Extended plays ==
Title	EP details
Slim Shady EP	Released: December 10, 1997; Label: Web; Format: CD, LP, cassette
Live at Ford Field (with Jack White)	Released: November 27, 2025; Label: Third Man, Shady, Aftermath, Interscope; Formats: Streaming, digital download
Infinite EP	Released: November 12, 2026; Label: Web Entertainment; Format: Streaming, digital download

== Mixtapes ==
Title	Details
New Jacks (with DJ Buttafingaz)	Released: 1988; Label: Independent; Format: Cassette
Steppin' On to the Scene (with Soul Intent)	Released: March 3, 1990; Label: Bassmint Productions; Format: Cassette
Under New Management / Cold Room On This Defin' Tape (with Soul Intent)	Released: 1992; Label: Bassmint Productions; Format: Cassette
Still in the Bassmint (with Soul Intent)	Released: October 14, 1992; Label: Bassmint Productions; Format: Cassette
M&M Solo Tape	Released: December, 1992; Label: Independent; Format: Cassette
Soul Intent (with Soul Intent)	Released: February 25, 1995; Label: Mashin' Duck Records; Format: Cassette

== Box sets ==
Title	Box set details
The Singles	Released: March 16, 2004; Label: Shady, Aftermath, Interscope, Web; Format: CD
The Vinyl LPs	Released: March 23, 2015; Label: Shady, Aftermath, Interscope; Format: LP
Eminem x Fortnite Radio	LP exclusive collection of songs heard on Fortnite Radio; Released: November 1, 2023; Format: LP
The Shady LPs	LP bundle including The Slim Shady LP and The Death of Slim Shady; Released: February 23, 2026; Format: LP

== See also ==
- Eminem singles discography
- Eminem production discography
- Eminem videography
- Bad Meets Evil discography
- D12 discography

== Notes ==
- A The 50 platinum albums certifications by the Recording Industry Association of America include forty-five platinum certifications credited as a solo artist and five certifications for albums with various artists. The 10 number one albums on the Billboard 200 include nine number one albums credited as a solo artist and one number one album with various artists.
- B The reported chart positions are of the latter release The Slim Shady LP (Special Edition). The original album release peaked up to number 46 on the Belgian Ultratop and 77 on the Swiss Hitparade.
- C The reported peak chart positions are indicative of the UK Compilation Albums Chart, as soundtracks and compilation albums by various artists are not eligible for the UK Albums Chart.
