= White America (song) =

2002 song by Eminem

Song by Eminem

from the album The Eminem Show
- Released: May 26, 2002
- Recorded: June 2001
- Studio: Marshall Mathers' house (Detroit, Michigan) 54 Sound (Ferndale, Michigan)
- Genre: Political hip hop; rap rock
- Length: 5:24
- Label: Shady; Aftermath; Interscope
- Songwriters: Marshall Mathers; Jeffrey Bass; Luis Resto; Steve King; Kevin Bell
- Producers: Eminem; Jeff Bass; Luis Resto

Music video
- "White America" on YouTube

"White America" is a political hip hop song by rapper Eminem released in 2002 from his fourth studio album, The Eminem Show. The song was also performed at the MTV Video Music Awards. It is the first full song on the album, and describes Eminem's rise to prominence and allegations from parents and politicians that he had influenced criminal behavior on young White Americans.

== Lyrical content ==
"White America" is segued into by the opening skit "Curtains Up" on The Eminem Show, which involves Eminem walking up to a microphone to make a speech. It addresses the controversy stemming from Eminem's lyrical content, and impacting White youth, expressed with lines such as: "I speak to suburban kids, who otherwise would've never known these words exist." "Eric" and "Erica" are representations of any White youth. Eminem also expressed his belief that his music is controversial only because it appeals to White kids, with lines such as, "Hip-hop was never a problem in Harlem, only in Boston / after it bothered the fathers of daughters starting to blossom."

Eminem also states his belief that his skin color helped with his popularity, and in effect introduced White fans to his producer, Dr. Dre, although earlier in his career it had prevented him from being taken seriously. The song also discusses the freedom of speech of the US Constitution through attacks on the then-Second Lady of the United States Lynne Cheney and her predecessor Tipper Gore, who questioned Eminem's legitimacy to freedom of speech and introduced the Parental Advisory sticker respectively.

== Music video ==
"White America" had an animated music video that featured imagery related to the lyrics, including Eminem appearing on a wanted poster and later being lynched while the U.S. Constitution is torn up in the foreground. Although this track is not a single, it has a video clip.

The video begins with a full-screen Parental Advisory logo. The animation then shows an elevator’s doors opening to reveal a cityscape with skyscrapers, a factory, and the American flag. Helicopters and planes fly over the city. On the streets, young people stand in front of an advertising poster that alters Nike's slogan, Just Do It, into Just Buy It. Two police officers are then seen beating a young man on the ground, though the action is obscured by the Parental Advisory logo. Behind the police car, posters of Eminem are visible, along with a young man wearing a T-shirt bearing the rapper’s image. One poster indicates that Marshall Mathers (Eminem's real name) is wanted.

A man reads a newspaper filled with propaganda articles, including an image of Uncle Sam giving the middle finger, censored by the same Parental Advisory logo. The video then shifts to a news report about a school shooting, showing both perpetrators as white. Two characters, Eric and Erica, appear, symbolizing white America. In a supermarket, a figurine of Eminem is displayed. The camera zooms in on its eyes, which transform into dollar signs.

The next scene takes place in a chaotic classroom during a math lesson. Eminem is then shown in a recording studio, but white audiences do not appreciate his work. The rapper later performs in front of a diverse audience, with his logo projected into the sky. A television screen reappears, showing drug dealers, followed by another appearance of Eric and Erica.

A mother is seen protesting in the street while her children watch a TV show featuring Eminem. The rapper continues writing lyrics as a noose tightens around his neck. He is then shown being choked, and a crowd gathers around his corpse, tearing up the U.S. Constitution.

The video transitions to scenes of Eminem's immense popularity among young people, with a crowd rushing to buy his latest album. The setting then shifts to a dystopian America, where military planes fly over a city littered with trash. Then-President George W. Bush is depicted giving a speech in front of the White House, which is represented as a pig controlled by strings. He stands before barrels of oil and stacks of money. Meanwhile, two men and a camera operator urinate on the White House lawn.

Airplanes drop television sets, which crash and display distorted news channels. The screens then morph into chattering mouths, possibly symbolizing censorship or media manipulation. Eminem appears to be making a statement about freedom of expression.

== Other use ==
Mother Jones magazine has stated that the song has been used in American military prisons to disorient and cause sleep deprivation among detainees. A second Eminem song, "Kim", has also been used.

"White America" was mashed up with "Fistful of Steel" by American rock band Rage Against the Machine in DJ Vlad & Roc Raida's mixtape, Rock Phenomenon. It was released on the mixtape on March 27, 2006, and, due to much critical praise, was re-released on July 10, 2007.

== Certifications ==
Region	Certification	Certified units/sales
Australia (ARIA)	Platinum	70,000^{‡}
New Zealand (RMNZ)	Gold	15,000^{‡}
United Kingdom (BPI)	Silver	200,000^{‡}
United States (RIAA)	Platinum	1,000,000^{‡}
^{‡} Sales+streaming figures based on certification alone.
