= Sing for the Moment =

2003 single by Eminem

Single by Eminem

from the album The Eminem Show
- B-side: "Rabbit Run"
- Released: February 25, 2003
- Genre: Hip-hop; rap rock
- Length: 5:40 (album version); 4:48 (clean radio edit); 6:23 (instrumental version)
- Label: Aftermath; Shady; Interscope
- Songwriters: Marshall Mathers; Jeffrey Bass; Luis Resto; Steve King; Steven Tyler
- Producers: Eminem; Jeff Bass

Eminem singles chronology
"Superman" (2003)	"Sing for the Moment" (2003)	"Business" (2003)

Music video
- "Sing for the Moment" on YouTube

Audio sample
- Eminem - "Sing for the Moment": file; help

"Sing for the Moment" is a song by American rapper Eminem from his fourth album The Eminem Show (2002). It was released on February 25, 2003, as the fourth single from The Eminem Show and the final single in the United States. The song samples "Dream On" by American rock band Aerosmith.

"Sing for the Moment" received positive reviews from music critics, with many critics praising Eminem's rapping ability, the lyrics, and the "Dream On" sample. "Sing for the Moment" proved to be successful, peaking inside the Top 10 in twenty countries. In the United States, "Sing for the Moment" reached number fourteen on the Billboard Hot 100. It was also a number-one hit in Portugal. The song, along with the original "Dream On", was used in a trailer for the 2016 animated film Sing.

== Background ==
"Sing for the Moment" was the first song Eminem wrote for the album. It contains samples of the song "Dream On" by the rock band Aerosmith. Joe Perry plays the guitar solo at the end of the song, and a sample of Steven Tyler singing is used as the chorus for this song. Eminem chants "sing" when Tyler starts to sing the chorus, and Eminem also chants "sing with me" and "come on". Eminem says the words in his live performances as well. The beginning of the song samples the intro of "Dream On" too. "Sing for the Moment" was later released on Eminem's greatest hits compilation album Curtain Call: The Hits (2005).

"Sing for the Moment" mentions John Guerra, a bouncer whom Eminem had an altercation with on June 4, 2000, after the rapper claimed he saw him kissing his ex-wife Kim. Eminem deliberately mispronounces his last name as "Guerrera":

You're full of shit too, Guerrera, that was a fist that hit you! (Bitch!)

The song reached #14 on the U.S. Billboard Hot 100 Singles Chart, #6 on the UK Singles Chart, and #5 on the Australian ARIAnet Singles Chart.

Eminem performed the song with Tyler during Eminem's 2022 Rock and Roll Hall of Fame Induction Ceremony performance, with Tyler singing the entire first verse of "Dream On" before Eminem began the first verse of "Sing for the Moment".

== Critical reception ==
David Browne wrote: "In 'Sing for the Moment,' which includes a tirade against the media and politically motivated prosecutors, the intensity of his delivery overcomes the hoariest of ideas – incorporating a portion of an overly familiar classic-rock oldie, Aerosmith's 'Dream On.' The song becomes a clarion call of suburban kids everywhere, not just an easy route to a hit."

HipHopDX concluded that in this song Eminem is dealing with his life and called it a "guitar-fueled track." RapReviews was positive: "'Sing For the Moment' may throw his fans a curveball though: a song which appears to sample Aerosmith's 'Dream On' yet simultaneously features the REAL Joe Perry playing guitar. Obviously not a stretch for the hard rock icons though, who are still remembered for recording 'Walk This Way' with Run-D.M.C. back in the 1980s, so it's an enjoyable diversion from non-stop hardcore hip-hop."

== Track listing ==
German CD single

No.	Title	Writer(s)	Producer(s)	Length
1.	"Sing for the Moment"	Marshall Mathers; Jeffrey Bass; Luis Resto; Steve King; Steven Tyler	Eminem; Jeff Bass^{[a]}	5:40
2.	"Rabbit Run"	Mathers; Resto	Eminem; Luis Resto^{[b]}	3:10
Total length:				8:50

German Maxi CD single

No.	Title	Writer(s)	Producer(s)	Length
1.	"Sing for the Moment"	Marshall Mathers; Jeffrey Bass; Luis Resto; Steve King; Steven Tyler	Eminem; Jeff Bass^{[a]}	5:40
2.	"Rabbit Run"	Mathers; Resto	Eminem; Luis Resto^{[b]}	3:10
3.	"Sing for the Moment" (instrumental)	Mathers; Bass; Resto; King; Tyler	Eminem; Bass^{[a]}	6:25
4.	"Sing for the Moment" (video)	Mathers; Bass; Resto; King; Tyler	Eminem; Bass^{[a]}	5:26
Total length:				20:41

German Limited Edition Maxi CD single (Encased in a limited edition digipak with three limited edition postcards)

No.	Title	Writer(s)	Producer(s)	Length
1.	"Sing for the Moment"	Marshall Mathers; Jeffrey Bass; Luis Resto; Steve King; Steven Tyler	Eminem; Jeff Bass^{[a]}	5:40
2.	"Rabbit Run"	Mathers; Resto	Eminem; Luis Resto^{[b]}	3:10
3.	"Sing for the Moment" (instrumental)	Mathers; Bass; Resto; King; Tyler	Eminem; Bass^{[a]}	6:25
4.	"Sing for the Moment" (video)	Mathers; Bass; Resto; King; Tyler	Eminem; Bass^{[a]}	5:26
Total length:				20:41

UK CD single

No.	Title	Writer(s)	Producer(s)	Length
1.	"Sing for the Moment"	Marshall Mathers; Jeffrey Bass; Luis Resto; Steve King; Steven Tyler	Eminem; Jeff Bass^{[a]}	5:40
2.	"Sing for the Moment" (instrumental)	Mathers; Bass; Resto; King; Tyler	Eminem; Bass^{[a]}	6:25
3.	"Rabbit Run" (soundtrack version)	Mathers; Resto	Eminem; Luis Resto^{[b]}	3:10
4.	"Sing for the Moment" (video)	Mathers; Bass; Resto; King; Tyler	Eminem; Bass^{[a]}	5:26
Total length:				20:41

UK cassette

No.	Title	Writer(s)	Producer(s)	Length
1.	"Sing for the Moment"	Marshall Mathers; Jeffrey Bass; Luis Resto; Steve King; Steven Tyler	Eminem; Jeff Bass^{[a]}	5:40
2.	"Sing for the Moment" (instrumental)	Mathers; Bass; Resto; King; Tyler	Eminem; Bass^{[a]}	6:25
3.	"Rabbit Run" (soundtrack version)	Mathers; Resto	Eminem; Luis Resto^{[b]}	3:10
Total length:				15:15

Notes

- ^{^[a]} signifies a co-producer.
- ^{^[b]} signifies an additional producer.

== Charts and certifications ==
=== Weekly charts ===
Chart (2003)	Peak position
Australia (ARIA)	5
Australian Urban (ARIA)	2
Austria (Ö3 Austria Top 40)	7
Belgium (Ultratop 50 Flanders)	6
Belgium (Ultratop 50 Wallonia)	15
Brazil (ABPD)	14
Canada (Nielsen SoundScan)	2
Denmark (Tracklisten)	4
Europe (Eurochart Hot 100)	2
Finland (Suomen virallinen lista)	5
France (SNEP)	5
Germany (GfK)	5
Hungary (Editors' Choice Top 40)	27
Ireland (IRMA)	3
Italy (FIMI)	5
Latvia (Latvian Airplay Top 50)	14
Netherlands (Dutch Top 40)	10
Netherlands (Single Top 100)	8
New Zealand (Recorded Music NZ)	5
Norway (VG-lista)	10
Portugal (AFP)	1
Romania (Romanian Top 100)	11
Scottish Singles Sales (Official Charts)	5
Spain (Promusicae)	17
Sweden (Sverigetopplistan)	11
Switzerland (Schweizer Hitparade)	8
UK Singles (Official Charts)	6
UK Hip Hop/R&B (Official Charts)	2
US Billboard Hot 100	14
US Hot Rap Songs (Billboard)	18
US Pop Airplay (Billboard)	5

=== Year-end charts ===
Chart (2003)	Position
Australia (ARIA)	56
Austria (Ö3 Austria Top 40)	41
Belgium (Ultratop Flanders)	55
Belgium (Ultratop Wallonia)	89
Brazil (Crowley)	99
Germany (Official German Charts)	45
Italy (FIMI)	30
Netherlands (Single Top 100)	86
Romania (Romanian Top 100)	71
Sweden (Sverigetopplistan)	61
Switzerland (Schweizer Hitparade)	59
UK Singles (Official Charts Company)	106
US Billboard Hot 100	89

=== Certifications ===
Region	Certification	Certified units/sales
Australia (ARIA)	4× Platinum	280,000^{‡}
Austria (IFPI Austria)	Gold	15,000^{*}
Brazil (Pro-Música Brasil)	Gold	30,000^{‡}
Denmark (IFPI Danmark)	Gold	45,000^{‡}
Germany (BVMI)	Gold	150,000^{‡}
Italy (FIMI)	Gold	50,000^{‡}
New Zealand (RMNZ)	2× Platinum	60,000^{‡}
United Kingdom (BPI)	Platinum	600,000^{‡}
United States (RIAA)	2× Platinum	2,000,000^{‡}
^{*} Sales figures based on certification alone.^{‡} Sales+streaming figures based on certification alone.
