= The Eminem Show =

2002 studio album by Eminem

Studio album by Eminem
- Released: May 26, 2002
- Recorded: August 2001 – April 2002
- Studios: Encore (Burbank, California); Marshall Mathers' house (Detroit, Michigan); 54 Sound (Ferndale, Michigan)
- Genres: Hip-hop; rap rock; political hip-hop
- Length: 77:30
- Labels: Shady; Goliath; Aftermath; WEB; Interscope
- Producers: Eminem; Dr. Dre; DJ Head; Jeff Bass; Luis Resto; Mr. Porter

Eminem chronology
The Marshall Mathers LP (2000)	The Eminem Show (2002)	Encore (2004)

Singles from The Eminem Show
- 1. "Without Me" Released: April 29, 2002; 2. "Cleanin' Out My Closet" Released: July 29, 2002; 3. "Superman" Released: January 21, 2003; 4. "Sing for the Moment" Released: February 25, 2003; 5. "Business" Released: July 22, 2003

The Eminem Show is the fourth studio album by the American rapper Eminem, released on May 26, 2002, through Shady Records, Goliath Artists, Aftermath Entertainment, WEB Entertainment, and Interscope Records. Eminem produced most of the album himself, with additional production by Dr. Dre, Jeff Bass, and Mr. Porter. While Eminem's previous two albums explored the frustration of life among America's underclass, The Eminem Show marked a drastic thematic shift. Guest appearances include Obie Trice, Paul Rosenberg, D12, Dr. Dre, Nate Dogg, Dina Rae and Eminem's daughter, Hailie Jade.

The Eminem Show's themes are predominantly based on Eminem's prominence in hip-hop culture, as well as his ambivalent thoughts of fame. It also features political commentary on the United States, including references to 9/11, Osama bin Laden, the war on terror, President George W. Bush, Lynne Cheney and Tipper Gore. It notably also incorporates a heavier use of rap rock than Eminem's previous albums. Due to its less satirical and shock factor lyrical approach, The Eminem Show was regarded as Eminem's most personal album at the time and a step back from the Slim Shady alter ego. The album was widely considered the most anticipated album of 2002.

The Eminem Show debuted at number one on the Billboard 200 and stood there for six non-consecutive weeks. It sold over 1.3 million copies in its second week in the United States, where it registered a full week of sales. It also topped the UK Albums Chart for five consecutive weeks and topped the charts in sixteen other countries. It produced four commercially successful singles, "Without Me", "Cleanin' Out My Closet", "Superman", and "Sing for the Moment". The album was a widespread critical success, with praise directed at Eminem's mature, introspective lyricism and the album's experimental production. Often debated as Eminem's best work, several publications named The Eminem Show the best album of 2002 and among the best albums of the 2000s.

The Eminem Show was both the best-selling album of 2002 in the United States and the best-selling album worldwide of 2002. The album has since been certified 12× platinum by the Recording Industry Association of America (RIAA), and its worldwide sales of 27 million copies make it one of the best-selling albums of all time, the third best-selling album of the 21st century, and the best-selling hip hop album of all time. At the 2003 Grammy Awards, it was nominated for Album of the Year and won Best Rap Album, while "Without Me" won Best Music Video.

== Background ==
Speaking to Spin, Eminem said, "Eventually, I might need some drama in my life to inspire me [...] With The Marshall Mathers LP, everything that everybody was saying–I took that, and it was my ammo. And then when shit died down a little bit, I had other turmoil in my personal life, so that was what I was able to dump out on The Eminem Show. Now, I just gotta wait for the next phase of my life. But something always seems to happen, man; something's always gotta be fucking turbulent."

Eminem cited that the inspiration for the album was taken from the Peter Weir-directed 1998 science fiction comedy-drama film The Truman Show. Jim Carrey starred in the film as the lead character Truman Burbank, a man who unwittingly lives inside a TV show, where his life is broadcast to viewers around the world. Eminem spoke on the film's influence, saying, "My life felt like it was becoming a circus around that time, and I felt like I was always being watched [...] Basically, Jim Carrey wrote my album."

== Recording ==
Speaking with Rolling Stone in 2002, Eminem said "'Sing for the Moment' was the first song I wrote for the album; 'Cleanin Out My Closet' was the second. I had the line in 'Cleanin Out My Closet' — 'I'd like to welcome y'all out to The Eminem Show'—and it was just a line, but I sat back and I was like, 'My life is really like a fucking show'. I have songs on the album that I wrote when I was in that shit last year, with a possible jail sentence hangin' over my head and all the emotions going through the divorce. I went through a lot of shit last year [lawsuits, divorce and the threat of jail time] that I resolved at the same time, all in the same year. And, yeah, that's when half of the album was wrote".

Eminem had started recording the album around the same time he was filming 8 Mile. Production was used for both the soundtrack of the film and his album. The album also saw Eminem take a substantially more predominant production role; most of it was self-produced, with his longtime collaborator Jeff Bass co-producing several tracks (mainly the songs which eventually became the released singles). Dr. Dre, in addition to being the album's executive producer, produced only three individual tracks: "Business", "Say What You Say", and "My Dad's Gone Crazy". Regarding his increase in producing, Eminem told Rolling Stone, "I actually know how to program a drum machine now. It used to be so simple—just writing lyrics and raps, laying vocals and leaving the studio was great. But now that I'm so into producing, it's a fucking job."

== Singles ==
"Without Me" was released as the album's lead single on May 14, 2002.

"Cleanin' Out My Closet" was released as the album's second single on July 29 of that same year. Releasing singles from this album went on a hiatus when "Lose Yourself" (one of the singles from 2002 soundtrack, 8 Mile: Music from and Inspired by the Motion Picture) was released on October 28.

Releasing singles from this album resumed when "Superman" (which features Dina Rae) was released as the third single on January 21, 2003.

"Sing for the Moment" was released as the fourth single on February 25 of that same year.

"Business" was released as the fifth and final single on July 22, though it was unreleased in the United States.

== Music and lyrics ==
Stylistically, The Eminem Show has a lighter tone than The Marshall Mathers LP and incorporates a heavier use of rap rock than Eminem's previous albums, featuring mixed guitar-driven melodies with hip-hop rhythms. In an interview with British magazine The Face in April 2002, Eminem said that he treated the album like it was a rock record. He continued that he "tried to get the best of both worlds" on the album. Eminem spoke on specific rock influences, saying, "I listened to a lot of '70s rock growing up, when I was real little. When I go back and listen to them songs, like Led Zeppelin or Aerosmith, Jimi Hendrix...'70s rock had this incredible feel to it." Notably, "Sing For The Moment" contains a sample of Aerosmith's "Dream On" as well as a reinterpretation of its guitar solo. Another rock sample on the album is the kick-clap beat of "'Till I Collapse", which is an interpolation of the intro from Queen's "We Will Rock You".

While Eminem's previous two albums explored the frustration of life among America's underclass, The Eminem Show marked a thematic shift. The themes of The Eminem Show are predominantly based on Eminem's prominence in hip-hop culture and the subsequent envy towards him, as well as his thoughts on his unexpected enormous success and its consequential negative effects on his life. The album also touches on Eminem's thoughts on themes surrounding American politics, including references to 9/11, Osama bin Laden, the war on terror President George W. Bush, Lynne Cheney and Tipper Gore. Speaking on his use of political commentary on the album, Eminem told Rolling Stone, "You put your shit out there for the world to see and to judge, and whoever agrees with you agrees with you. Even my most die-hard fans don't agree with everything I say. These are my views, this is how I see it. You may have your own opinion, but you may not get to project it to the world like I do." Writing for Spin, rock critic Alan Light said that the album may have proved that Eminem is the most "dexterous, vivid writer in pop music". The album also sees Eminem dissing several artists, including Mariah Carey, Moby, Canibus and Limp Bizkit, while Dr. Dre disses Jermaine Dupri on the song "Say What You Say", and so does Timbaland at the very end of the song.

Lyrically, the album also displays a dramatic shift from the misogynistic and homophobic lyrics presented on The Marshall Mathers LP. Eminem told Spin, "One of the frustrating things was people saying, 'He's got to cuss to sell records,' [...] That's why with this album, I toned it down a bit as far as shock value. I wanted to show that I'm a solid artist, and I'm here to stay." Due to its less satirical and shock factor lyrical approach, The Eminem Show was regarded as a departure from Eminem's previous albums with it being more personal and reflective and a step back of the Slim Shady alter ego. Eminem said during an interview with MTV that he felt that The Eminem Show was his "best record so far". In 2006, Q said that Eminem's first two albums "aired dirty laundry, then the world's most celebrated rapper [Eminem] examined life in the hall of mirrors he'd built for himself."

With the release of The Eminem Show, Eminem was considered to be more socially acceptable: there were no protests over his lyrics, boycotts, and talk shows discussing his impact on America's youth. A columnist of The New York Observer wrote that Eminem had become a "guilty pleasure" for baby boomers, describing him as "the most compelling figure to have emerged from popular music since the holy trinity of [Bob] Dylan, [John] Lennon, and [Mick] Jagger."

=== Censored version ===
The "clean version" of The Eminem Show censors many more profanities and derogatory words than in clean versions of Eminem's previous albums, in which the words "goddamn", "prick", "bastard", "piss", "bitch", "ass", and "shit" were allowed. This album allowed no profanities, and the profanities were either muted, obscured by sound effects, or back-masked. In addition to this, entire sentences were sometimes removed from the censored version for being very sexually charged. The entire song "Drips" was removed in early clean versions and is heard only as four seconds of silence moving on to the next track, "Without Me". Later on, digital releases of the clean version removed "Drips" completely, moving the next 11 songs up on the tracklist. Some copies of the clean version, however, feature an edited version of "Drips".

There are some inconsistencies in the clean version's censorship. In the skit "The Kiss", Eminem's shouting of the word "motherfucker!" is still audible in the censored version. In the track, "Soldier", which is a continuation of "The Kiss", the word "bitch" was used three times, and can be clearly heard once. Also, in "White America", the word "flag" is back masked when he raps, "To burn the flag and replace it with a parental advisory sticker".

== Critical reception ==
Professional ratings
Aggregate scores
Source	Rating
Metacritic	75/100
Review scores
Source	Rating
AllMusic	4/5 stars
Christgau's Consumer Guide	A−
Entertainment Weekly	B+
Houston Chronicle	4/5
NME	9/10
Pitchfork	9.1/10
Q	3/5 stars
Rolling Stone	4/5 stars
The Rolling Stone Album Guide	4/5 stars
USA Today	3/4 stars

According to the review aggregator Metacritic, The Eminem Show received "generally favorable reviews" based on a weighted average score of 75 out of 100 from 20 critic scores.

Alex Needham of NME hailed The Eminem Show as a "fantastic third album" that "is bigger, bolder and far more consistent than its predecessors". David Browne of Entertainment Weekly felt the album's more personal lyrics "succeed in fleshing out Eminem's complexities and contradictions", nonetheless concluding that "[l]ike its predecessors, though, The Eminem Show is a testament to the skills of its star. The sludgy rapping of such guests as D12 only confirms Eminem's dizzying prowess, gob-spewing individuality, and wickedly prankish humor." Writing for Rolling Stone, Kris Ex argued that Eminem "may have made the best rap-rock album in history".

Slant Magazine's Sal Cinquemani wrote that he "peels back some of the bullshit façade and reveals a little bit of the real Marshall Mathers" on an album that "displays a—dare I say it?—more 'mature' Eminem." In his review for AllMusic, Stephen Thomas Erlewine said the album "proves Eminem is the gold standard in pop music in 2002, delivering stylish, catchy, dense, funny, political music that rarely panders". Critic Robert Christgau wrote: "I think it represents an articulate, coherent, formally appropriate response to Eminem's changing position and role, one that acknowledges the privileges and alienations that accrue to all fame as well as the resolution of Marshall Mathers's worst traumas and the specifics of his success."

Edna Gundersen of USA Today wrote that Eminem is "as good as he gets but in the end inflicts more damage on himself, hoisting The Eminem Show to a level of self-absorption rivaled only by Woody Allen", and despite the presence of some mediocre tracks, he "displays an admirable dexterity in blending invective and invention, even though his approach is more reactionary than revolutionary." Uncut wrote, "Behind the hype and the swagger, he's still baring enough of his soul for The Eminem Show to be compelling theatre." Q was more mixed in its assessment, stating that as "Eminem outgrows his old alter-id, so the obligatory pantomime villainy, skits and crass cameos by Shady Records signings become a hindrance." Marc L. Hill of PopMatters felt that the album lacked the shock factor of his previous albums and described it as "a disappointing combination of promising musical experimentation and uninspired lyrics."

Ethan P. for Pitchfork published a review of The Eminem Show on June 3, 2002, consisting of a comical, meandering stream of consciousness text. While rating it a 9.1/10, P. vulgarly criticized various aspects of the album, including its lead singles, its lyrics, and especially "My Dad's Gone Crazy", which he described as a "saccharine-sweetened lemon incest gone faggy [sic]". The review, making use of abrupt line breaks and written entirely in lowercase, also described a frustration with the perceived homoerotic themes deployed as jokes in the album, referring to "the him fucking dre thing / dyeing your hair and wearing earrings thing from the aerosmith song / or hailie being 'the only lady he adores' / sleazy disco / little eric and erica / dre is batman and he's the burt ward robin / etc [sic]". Despite its comedically self-referential sections, including a paragraph where P. states "if you're reading this sentence then wow i really got an unedited review on pfork [sic]", the review and his rating has remained on the Pitchfork website.

Blender named The Eminem Show the best album of 2002. The album became Eminem's third to win the Grammy Award for Best Rap Album, while "Without Me" won Eminem his first Best Music Video award. The album swept the MTV Music Video Awards, winning four awards for Best Male Video, Video of the Year, Best Direction, and Best Rap Video. The album also won Best Album at the 2002 MTV Europe Music Awards, both Album of the Year and Top R&B/Hip Hop Album at the 2002 Billboard Music Awards, both Favorite Rap/Hip-Hop Album and Favorite Pop/Rock Album at the 2003 American Music Awards, Best International Album at the 2003 Brit Awards, and International Album of the Year at the Juno Awards of 2003.

=== Legacy and reappraisal ===
The Eminem Show received critical praise by most music critics and is often debated as Eminem's most personal and best work. The album cemented Eminem's "three-peat" of classic hip-hop albums, following the critical appraisal of The Slim Shady LP and The Marshall Mathers LP. In 2003, the album was ranked number 317 on Rolling Stone's list of The 500 Greatest Albums of All Time, and was later ranked at number 84 on the same magazine's Best Albums of the 2000s Decade. In 2007, it was ranked number 63 by The National Association of Recording Merchandisers, in conjunction with the Rock and Roll Hall of Fame, in their list of the Definite 200 Albums of All Time. In 2012, Complex magazine deemed it a "classic" album that "cemented Eminem's place as one of the most important figures in rap history", and has included it on their list of 100 Best Albums of the Complex Decade, placing it at number 5. Following the 15th anniversary of the album, the Grammy Awards also described The Eminem Show as a "classic album". Popdose ranked the album at 79 on its Best Albums of the Decade list. In 2015, The Eminem Show was ranked number 56 on the Greatest of All Time Billboard 200 Albums. In a 2024 ranking of Eminem's 12 studio albums, Damien Scott of Billboard magazine placed The Eminem Show third, concluding: "By all accounts, Em's fourth album was the best show on earth."

== Commercial performance ==
The Eminem Show was originally scheduled for release on June 4, 2002; however, pirated and bootlegged copies appeared online via peer-to-peer networks and began surfacing on the streets. It was provided by Rabid Neurosis (RNS), an MP3 warez release organisation who pirated the album twenty-five days prior to release. Radio show Opie and Anthony broadcast the entire album on May 17, 2002. Interscope decided to release the album earlier than planned, on May 28 to prevent bootlegging. However, many stores in the United States began selling it even earlier than the new release date on Sunday, May 26, and some put the album out as early as Friday. Promotional posters in stores read, "America Couldn't Wait". Due to the premature release by many retailers on a Sunday, the album had only one day of official sales for the chart week and was unavailable in Walmart stores during that period. The Eminem Show was Eminem's first album to include lyrics to all its songs inside the CD booklet. Additionally, the first 2,000,000 copies of the album shipped in the United States included a bonus DVD with an exclusive interview and live footage. A week before the album's release, it was the second-most played CD on computers, the highest ranking ever for an unreleased title. It was considered the most anticipated album of 2002.

Despite the confusion over the exact release date, the album still managed to have a very successful debut on the charts. The Eminem Show debuted at number one on the Billboard 200, selling approximately 284,000 copies in its first day, marking the first time an album had topped the chart from only a day's sale. It sold 1,322,000 copies in the following week, its first full week of sales. The first 10-day sales total were 1.6 million. The following week sold 809,000 copies in its third week and 529,562 copies in its fourth week to bring its four-week sales total to just under 3 million copies. The album sold 381,000 copies in its fifth week and topped the Billboard 200 for a fifth and final consecutive week. On March 7, 2011, the album was certified Diamond by the Recording Industry Association of America (RIAA) for shipping 12 million copies, making it Eminem's second album to receive a Diamond certification in the United States. The album has sold 10,3 million copies on United States. It has also achieved Diamond certification in Canada and 18× Platinum in Australia.

The Eminem Show has sold 27 million copies worldwide, making it one of the best-selling albums of all time and Eminem's best-selling album. It reached number one in 18 other countries: Argentina, Australia, Austria, Belgium, Canada, Czech Republic, the Netherlands, Finland, Germany, Greece, Ireland, Italy, New Zealand, Norway, South Africa, Sweden, Switzerland and the UK. The album also spent five consecutive weeks at the top of the UK Albums Chart.

== Expanded edition ==
On May 24, 2022, Eminem announced the release of the expanded edition of the album on his social media to celebrate its 20th anniversary. On May 26, 2022, Eminem released the new expanded edition, which contains instrumentals of selected tracks, freestyles and live versions of songs from previous albums performed with his longtime friend and collaborator Proof at Tramps, New York and Fuji Rock Festival, Japan. It also features four new tracks which were recorded during the initial recording sessions but not included in the original version of the album; "Stimulate", which was kept off the album due to time constraints and instead appeared on the bonus disc of the 8 Mile soundtrack album, "Bump Heads" and "The Conspiracy Freestyle" (which had appeared on other Shady Records releases), and an unreleased song, "Jimmy, Brian and Mike", which had a verse and chorus re-recorded by Eminem especially for the expanded edition. Physical versions of the expanded edition were released later in the year, including a 4xLP vinyl set, CD, and cassette. Along with Curtain Call 2, it was nominated for an Outstanding Anthology/Compilation/Reissue at the 2023 Detroit Music Awards.

== Track listing ==
Standard edition
No.	Title	Writer(s)	Producer(s)	Length
1.	"Curtains Up (Skit)"	Marshall Mathers	Eminem	0:30
2.	"White America"	Mathers; Jeff Bass; Luis Resto; Steve King; Kevin Bell	Eminem; Jeff Bass; Luis Resto^{[a]}	5:24
3.	"Business"	Mathers; Andre Young; Theron Feemster; Mike Elizondo	Dr. Dre	4:11
4.	"Cleanin' Out My Closet"	Mathers; Bass	Eminem; Bass	4:57
5.	"Square Dance"	Mathers; Bass; Resto	Eminem; Bass^{[a]}	5:23
6.	"The Kiss (Skit)"	Mathers; Bass	Eminem	1:15
7.	"Soldier"	Mathers; Resto; King; Bell; Bass; Elizondo	Eminem	3:46
8.	"Say Goodbye Hollywood"	Mathers; Elizondo; Resto	Eminem	4:32
9.	"Drips" (featuring Obie Trice)	Mathers; Obie Trice; Denaun Porter; Bass	Eminem; Bass	4:45
10.	"Without Me"	Mathers; Bass; Malcolm McLaren; Anne Dudley; Trevor Horn; Bell; Urban Kris; Shawn Baumgardner	Eminem; Bass^{[a]}; DJ Head^{[b]}	4:50
11.	"Paul Rosenberg (Skit)"	Paul Rosenberg	Eminem; Dr. Dre	0:22
12.	"Sing for the Moment"	Mathers; Bass; Resto; King; Steven Tyler	Eminem; Bass^{[a]}	5:39
13.	"Superman" (featuring Dina Rae)	Mathers; Bass; King	Eminem; Bass^{[b]}	5:50
14.	"Hailie's Song"	Mathers; Resto	Eminem	5:20
15.	"Steve Berman (Skit)"	Mathers; Steve Berman	Dr. Dre	0:33
16.	"When the Music Stops" (featuring D12)	Mathers; Ondre Moore; Denaun Porter; Von Carlisle; DeShaun Holton; Rufus Johnson; Feemster	Eminem; Mr. Porter^{[a]}	4:29
17.	"Say What You Say" (featuring Dr. Dre)	Mathers; Feemster; Elizondo	Dr. Dre	5:09
18.	"'Till I Collapse" (featuring Nate Dogg)	Mathers; Nathaniel Hale; Resto; Brian May	Eminem	4:57
19.	"My Dad's Gone Crazy" (featuring Hailie Jade)	Mathers; Young; Feemster; Elizondo	Dr. Dre	4:27
20.	"Curtains Close (Skit)"	Mathers	Eminem	1:01
Total length:				77:19

Expanded edition
No.	Title	Writer(s)	Producer(s)	Length
21.	"Stimulate"	Mathers; Bass	Eminem; Bass	5:03
22.	"The Conspiracy Freestyle"	Mathers; Justin Henderson	J-Hen	2:50
23.	"Bump Heads" (featuring Tony Yayo, Lloyd Banks and 50 Cent)	Mathers; Marvin Bernard; Christopher Lloyd; Curtis Jackson	Eminem	4:41
24.	"Jimmy, Brian and Mike"	Mathers; Young; Elizondo; Resto; Ronnie DeVoe; Ricky Bell; Ralph Tresvant; Michael Bivins	Dr. Dre; Mike Elizondo; Eminem ^{[a]}	3:21
25.	"Freestyle #1" (Live from Tramps, New York / 1999)	Mathers; Rob Parissi; Melissa Elliott; Timothy Mosley	Eminem	1:17
26.	"Brain Damage" (Live from Tramps, New York / 1999)	Mathers; J. Bass; Mark Bass	Eminem	1:24
27.	"Freestyle #2" (Live from Tramps, New York / 1999)	Mathers	Eminem	0:52
28.	"Just Don't Give a Fuck" (Live from Tramps, New York / 1999)	Mathers; J. Bass; M. Bass	Eminem	3:15
29.	"The Way I Am" (featuring Proof) (Live from Fuji Festival, Japan / 2001)	Mathers; Holton	Eminem	3:43
30.	"The Real Slim Shady" (featuring Proof) (Live from Fuji Festival, Japan / 2001)	Mathers	Eminem	4:45
31.	"Business" (Instrumental)		Dr. Dre	4:11
32.	"Cleanin' Out My Closet" (Instrumental)		Eminem; Bass	5:42
33.	"Square Dance" (Instrumental)		Eminem; Bass	6:17
34.	"Without Me" (Instrumental)		Eminem; Bass^{[a]}; DJ Head^{[b]}	4:48
35.	"Sing for the Moment" (Instrumental)		Eminem; Bass	6:23
36.	"Superman" (Instrumental)		Eminem; Bass	7:02
37.	"Say What You Say" (Instrumental)		Dr. Dre	5:06
38.	"'Till I Collapse" (Instrumental)		Eminem	5:45
Total length:				71:19

Notes

- ^{^[a]} signifies a co-producer.
- ^{^[b]} signifies an additional producer.
- Early clean versions of the album replace "Drips" with four seconds of silence. Later clean versions either feature an edited version of the song or don’t have the song available.
- Another censored version of the album did not allow the words "goddamn", "prick", "bastard", "piss", "bitch", "ass", "shit" and "fuck" to be left uncensored.
- "Curtain Close (skit)" is performed by Ken Kaniff, who Eminem portrays at the end of the album before continuing on with the persona on Relapse in 2009, as displayed in the album booklet.
- Special edition includes a bonus DVD which features several live performances, featurettes and music videos.
- Japanese collector's box includes a bonus DVD which features the music video, karaoke video clip and behind the scenes of "Without Me", as well as an interview.

== Personnel ==
- Jeff Bass – producer (track 4), co-producer (2, 10, 12), additional production (13), keyboards (4, 5, 7, 9, 10, 12, 13), guitars (2, 4, 7, 9, 10, 12), bass (2, 4, 9, 10, 12, 13)
- Steve Baughman – engineer and mixing (track 16)
- Steve Berman – performer (track 15)
- Bizarre – featured vocals (track 16)
- Bob Canero – assistant engineer (tracks 3, 19)
- Dr. Dre – featured vocals (track 17), producer (3, 17, 19), mixing (3, 10, 14, 17, 19)
- Mike Elizondo – keyboards (tracks 1, 17, 19), bass (3, 8, 19), guitars (3, 17), additional keyboards (7)
- Eminem – vocals, producer (tracks 1, 2, 4–10, 12–14, 16, 18)
- Ron Feemster – keyboards (tracks 1, 3, 16, 17, 19)
- Shy Felder – background vocals (track 3)
- Francis Forde – assistant engineer (tracks 1, 16)
- Marti Frederiksen – Joe Perry's guitar engineer (track 12)
- Brian "Big Bass" Gardner – mastering
- DJ Head – additional production (track 10), drum programming (2, 12), additional drum programming (4, 7)
- Mauricio "Veto" Iragorri – engineer (tracks 1, 3, 16, 17, 19), additional engineering (10), mixing (1), mix engineer (14)
- Steve King – engineer (tracks 2–10, 12, 13, 17–19), mixing (2, 4–9, 12–14, 18), mix engineer (14), guitar and bass (18), additional guitars (2), television voiceover (19)
- Gary Kozlowski – background vocals (track 6)
- Urban Kris – assistant engineer (tracks 2–4, 7–10, 13, 14, 18, 19)
- Kuniva – featured vocals (track 16)
- Hailie Jade Mathers – featured vocals (track 19)
- James "Flea" McCrone – assistant engineer (tracks 3, 14, 17, 19)
- Swifty McVay – featured vocals (track 16)
- Mel-Man – drum programming (track 8)
- Nate Dogg – featured vocals (track 18)
- Traci Nelson – background vocals (track 3)
- Conesha Monet Owens – background vocals (track 3)
- Joe Perry – guitar solo (track 12)
- Steven Tyler – vocals (track 12)
- Denaun "Kon Artis" Porter – featured vocals, co-producer, and drum programming (track 16)
- Proof – featured vocals (track 16)
- Lynette Purdy – background vocals (track 6)
- Dina Rae – featured vocals (track 13), additional background vocals (track 2)
- Luis Resto – keyboards (track 8)
- Alex Reverberi – assistant engineer (tracks 3, 10, 19)
- Paul D. Rosenberg, Esq. – performer (track 11)
- Thomas Rounds – assistant engineer (track 16)
- Mike Strange – assistant engineer (tracks 2–10, 12–14, 17–19)
- Timbaland – phone call (track 17)
- Obie Trice – featured vocals (track 9)
- Barbara Wilson – background vocals (track 3)

== Charts ==
=== Weekly charts ===
Weekly chart performance for The Eminem Show
Chart (2002–2003)	Peak position
Australian Albums (ARIA)	1
Australian Hip-Hop/R&B Albums (ARIA)	1
Austrian Albums (Ö3 Austria)	1
Belgian Albums (Ultratop Flanders)	1
Belgian Albums (Ultratop Wallonia)	3
Canadian Albums (Billboard)	1
Canadian R&B Albums (Nielsen SoundScan)	1
Danish Albums (Hitlisten)	2
Dutch Albums (Album Top 100)	1
European Albums (Billboard)	1
Finnish Albums (Suomen virallinen lista)	1
French Albums (SNEP)	2
German Albums (Offizielle Top 100)	1
Greek Albums (IFPI)	1
Hungarian Albums (MAHASZ)	2
Irish Albums (IRMA)	1
Italian Albums (FIMI)	1
Japanese Albums (Oricon)	3
Malaysian Albums (RIM)	5
New Zealand Albums (RMNZ)	1
Norwegian Albums (VG-lista)	1
Polish Albums (ZPAV)	2
Portuguese Albums (AFP)	3
Scottish Albums (Official Charts)	1
Singaporean Albums (RIAS)	3
South African Albums (RISA)	1
Spanish Albums (PROMUSICAE)	4
Swedish Albums (Sverigetopplistan)	1
Swiss Albums (Schweizer Hitparade)	1
UK Albums (Official Charts)	1
UK R&B Albums (Official Charts)	1
US Billboard 200	1
US Top R&B/Hip-Hop Albums (Billboard)	1

2013 weekly chart performance for The Eminem Show
Chart (2013)	Peak position
US Top Catalog Albums (Billboard)	2

2017 weekly chart performance for The Eminem Show
Chart (2017)	Peak position
US Top Rap Albums (Billboard)	14

=== Year-end charts ===
2002 year-end chart performance for The Eminem Show
Chart (2002)	Position
Australian Albums (ARIA)	1
Australian Hip Hop/R&B Albums (ARIA)	1
Austrian Albums (Ö3 Austria)	5
Belgian Albums (Ultratop Flanders)	3
Belgian Alternative Albums (Ultratop Flanders)	1
Belgian Albums (Ultratop Wallonia)	6
Canadian Albums (Nielsen SoundScan)	2
Canadian Alternative Albums (Nielsen SoundScan)	1
Canadian R&B Albums (Nielsen SoundScan)	1
Canadian Rap Albums (Nielsen SoundScan)	1
Danish Albums (Hitlisten)	5
Dutch Albums (Album Top 100)	6
European Albums (Music & Media)	4
Finnish Albums (Suomen viralinen lista)	4
French Albums (SNEP)	13
German Albums (Offizielle Top 100)	6
Irish Albums (IRMA)	7
Italian Albums (FIMI)	16
Japanese Albums (Oricon)	96
New Zealand Albums (RMNZ)	3
Spanish International Albums (AFYPE)	9
Swedish Albums (Sverigetopplistan)	4
Swedish Albums & Compilations (Sverigetopplistan)	4
Swiss Albums (Schweizer Hitparade)	5
UK Albums (OCC)	7
US Billboard 200	1
US Top R&B/Hip-Hop Albums (Billboard)	1
Worldwide Albums (IFPI)	1

2003 year-end chart performance for The Eminem Show
Chart (2003)	Position
Australian Albums (ARIA)	6
Australian Hip Hop/R&B Albums (ARIA)	1
Austrian Albums (Ö3 Austria)	21
Belgian Albums (Ultratop Flanders)	23
Belgian Alternative Albums (Ultratop Flanders)	9
Belgian Albums (Ultratop Wallonia)	27
Danish Albums (Hitlisten)	32
Dutch Albums (Album Top 100)	33
European Albums (Billboard)	9
Finnish Albums (Suomen viralinen lista)	28
French Albums (SNEP)	35
German Albums (Offizielle Top 100)	15
Hungarian Albums (MAHASZ)	43
Irish Albums (IRMA)	20
Italian Albums (FIMI)	40
Japanese Albums (Oricon)	99
New Zealand Albums (RMNZ)	15
Swedish Albums (Sverigetopplistan)	41
Swedish Albums & Compilations (Sverigetopplistan)	55
Swiss Albums (Schweizer Hitparade)	34
UK Albums (OCC)	39
US Billboard 200	14
US Top R&B/Hip-Hop Albums (Billboard)	16
Worldwide Albums (IFPI)	20

2004 year-end chart performance for The Eminem Show
Chart (2004)	Position
Australian Hip Hop/R&B Albums (ARIA)	28
French Albums (SNEP)	176

2010 year-end chart performance for The Eminem Show
Chart (2010)	Position
Australian Hip Hop/R&B Albums (ARIA)	31

2011 year-end chart performance for The Eminem Show
Chart (2011)	Position
Australian Hip Hop/R&B Albums (ARIA)	29

2013 year-end chart performance for The Eminem Show
Chart (2013)	Position
Australian Hip Hop/R&B Albums (ARIA)	37
US Catalog Albums (Billboard)	27

2014 year-end chart performance for The Eminem Show
Chart (2014)	Position
Australian Hip Hop/R&B Albums (ARIA)	32
US Billboard 200	120
US Catalog Albums (Billboard)	9

2015 year-end chart performance for The Eminem Show
Chart (2015)	Position
Australian Hip Hop/R&B Albums (ARIA)	22
US Billboard 200	99
US Catalog Albums (Billboard)	17

2016 year-end chart performance for The Eminem Show
Chart (2016)	Position
Australian Hip Hop/R&B Albums (ARIA)	19
US Billboard 200	84
US Catalog Albums (Billboard)	33

2017 year-end chart performance for The Eminem Show
Chart (2017)	Position
Australian Hip Hop/R&B Albums (ARIA)	17
US Billboard 200	75
US Catalog Albums (Billboard)	11
US Top R&B/Hip-Hop Albums (Billboard)	49

2018 year-end chart performance for The Eminem Show
Chart (2018)	Position
Australian Hip Hop/R&B Albums (ARIA)	31
Danish Albums (Hitlisten)	88

2019 year-end chart performance for The Eminem Show
Chart (2019)	Position
Australian Hip Hop/R&B Albums (ARIA)	22
Danish Albums (Hitlisten)	90

2020 year-end chart performance for The Eminem Show
Chart (2020)	Position
Australian Hip Hop/R&B Albums (ARIA)	32
Belgian Albums (Ultratop Flanders)	186
US Billboard 200	162
US Catalog Albums (Billboard)	32

2021 year-end chart performance for The Eminem Show
Chart (2021)	Position
Australian Albums (ARIA)	88
Australian Hip Hop/R&B Albums (ARIA)	26
Belgian Albums (Ultratop Flanders)	167
Danish Albums (Hitlisten)	96

2022 year-end chart performance for The Eminem Show
Chart (2022)	Position
Australian Albums (ARIA)	51
Australian Hip Hop/R&B Albums (ARIA)	11
Belgian Albums (Ultratop Flanders)	75
Belgian Albums (Ultratop Wallonia)	155
Danish Albums (Hitlisten)	52
Dutch Albums (Album Top 100)	44
Icelandic Albums (Tónlistinn)	98
Lithuanian Albums (AGATA)	41
New Zealand Albums (RMNZ)	28
Swedish Albums (Sverigetopplistan)	79
US Billboard 200	166

2023 year-end chart performance for The Eminem Show
Chart (2023)	Position
Australian Albums (ARIA)	49
Australian Hip Hop/R&B Albums (ARIA)	10
Austrian Albums (Ö3 Austria)	30
Belgian Albums (Ultratop Flanders)	50
Belgian Albums (Ultratop Wallonia)	85
Canadian Albums (Billboard)	47
Danish Albums (Hitlisten)	58
Dutch Albums (Album Top 100)	47
German Albums (Offizielle Top 100)	52
Hungarian Albums (MAHASZ)	63
New Zealand Albums (RMNZ)	37
Polish Albums (ZPAV)	96
Swedish Albums (Sverigetopplistan)	69
Swiss Albums (Schweizer Hitparade)	57
UK Albums (OCC)	76

2024 year-end chart performance of The Eminem Show
Chart (2024)	Position
Australian Albums (ARIA)	63
Australian Hip Hop/R&B Albums (ARIA)	16
Belgian Albums (Ultratop Flanders)	58
Belgian Albums (Ultratop Wallonia)	91
Danish Albums (Hitlisten)	83
Dutch Albums (Album Top 100)	59
German Albums (Offizielle Top 100)	30
Hungarian Albums (MAHASZ)	54
Swiss Albums (Schweizer Hitparade)	64
UK Albums (OCC)	92

2025 year-end chart performance of The Eminem Show
Chart (2025)	Position
Australian Hip Hop/R&B Albums (ARIA)	23
Belgian Albums (Ultratop Flanders)	74
Belgian Albums (Ultratop Wallonia)	136
German Albums (Offizielle Top 100)	61
Hungarian Albums (MAHASZ)	86

=== Decade-end charts ===
Decade-end chart performance for The Eminem Show
Chart (2000–2009)	Position
Australian Albums (ARIA)	10
UK Albums (OCC)	61
US Billboard 200	3
US Top Hip-Hop/R&B Albums (Billboard)	7

== Certifications and sales ==
Certifications and sales for The Eminem Show
Region	Certification	Certified units/sales
Argentina (CAPIF)	Platinum	40,000^{^}
Australia (ARIA)	19× Platinum	1,330,000^{‡}
Austria (IFPI Austria)	2× Platinum	60,000^{*}
Belgium (BRMA)	Platinum	50,000^{*}
Brazil (Pro-Música Brasil)	Gold	50,000^{*}
Canada (Music Canada)	Diamond	1,000,000^{^}
Croatia (HDU)	Gold	
Denmark (IFPI Danmark)	9× Platinum	180,000^{‡}
Finland (Musiikkituottajat)	2× Platinum	62,212
France (SNEP)	2× Platinum	600,000^{*}
Germany (BVMI)	3× Platinum	900,000^{‡}
Greece (IFPI Greece)	Platinum	30,000^{^}
Hungary (MAHASZ)	2× Platinum	40,000^{^}
Italy sales 2002-2003	—	250,000
Italy (FIMI) sales since 2009	2× Platinum	100,000^{‡}
Japan (RIAJ)	3× Platinum	600,000^{^}
Mexico (AMPROFON)	Gold	75,000^{^}
Netherlands (NVPI)	Platinum	80,000^{^}
New Zealand (RMNZ)	9× Platinum	135,000^{^}
Norway (IFPI Norway)	Platinum	112,000
Poland (ZPAV)	Gold	35,000^{*}
Portugal (AFP)	Platinum	40,000^{^}
Singapore (RIAS)	Gold	5,000^{*}
South Africa (RISA)	2× Platinum	100,000^{*}
South Korea	—	202,390
Spain (Promusicae)	2× Platinum	200,000^{^}
Sweden (GLF)	2× Platinum	120,000^{^}
Switzerland (IFPI Switzerland)	3× Platinum	120,000^{^}
United Kingdom (BPI)	7× Platinum	2,100,000^{‡}
United States (RIAA)	12× Platinum	12,000,000^{‡}
Summaries
Europe (IFPI)	5× Platinum	5,000,000^{*}
^{*} Sales figures based on certification alone.^{^} Shipments figures based on certification alone.^{‡} Sales+streaming figures based on certification alone.

== See also ==
- Album era
- Grammy Award for Best Rap Album
- List of best-selling albums of the 21st century
- List of best-selling albums
- List of best-selling albums in Australia
- List of best-selling albums in the United States
- List of best-selling albums of the 2000s (decade) in the United Kingdom
- List of fastest-selling albums
