= Without Me (Eminem song) =

2002 single by Eminem

Single by Eminem

from the album The Eminem Show
- B-side: "The Way I Am" (Danny Lohner remix) (featuring Marilyn Manson); "Say What You Say" (featuring Dr. Dre)
- Released: April 29, 2002
- Recorded: July 2001 (Instrumental); February 2002 (Eminem's vocals)
- Genre: Comedy hip-hop
- Length: 4:51 (album version); 4:23 (radio edit)
- Label: Shady; Aftermath; Interscope
- Songwriters: Marshall Mathers; Jeffrey Bass; Kevin Bell; Anne Dudley; Malcolm McLaren; Trevor Horn
- Producers: Eminem; Jeff Bass; DJ Head

Eminem singles chronology
"Hellbound" (2002)	"Without Me" (2002)	"Cleanin' Out My Closet" (2002)

Music video
- "Without Me" on YouTube

Audio sample
- "Without Me": file; help

"Without Me" is a song by American rapper Eminem from his fourth studio album The Eminem Show (2002). "Without Me" was released on April 29, 2002, as the lead single from the album, and re-released on his greatest hits compilation album Curtain Call: The Hits (2005). "Without Me" is one of Eminem's most successful singles, reaching number two on the U.S. Billboard Hot 100, and number one in fifteen countries.

== Background and recording ==
Eminem and Jeff Bass first began working on "Without Me" in the summer of 2001, during a late-night recording session for The Eminem Show. Eminem played a pre-recorded drum track provided to him by DJ Head, to which Bass played various keyboard sounds until he found a bass guitar effect that suitably matched the track. Bass repeated two notes over the track that prompted Eminem to sound out what became the song's melody, which Bass then recorded on saxophone. Eminem, Bass and engineer Steve King wrote and recorded the music in approximately 30 minutes, finishing at 3:00AM. Eminem presented the song's lyrics to Bass around three months later.

== Content ==
The song was Eminem's return after the successful Marshall Mathers LP, intended as a sequel to "The Real Slim Shady" and essentially says that he is back to save the world. It also refers to Eminem's role in the music industry and his effect on culture.

The song mocks a number of Eminem's critics, including Vice President Dick Cheney (including his recurring heart problems) and his wife Lynne, the FCC, Chris Kirkpatrick (of NSYNC), Limp Bizkit and Moby, as well as parodying Prince's decision to change his name to an unpronounceable symbol. It also lampoons comparisons of him to Elvis Presley as a white man succeeding commercially in a predominantly black art form. A line also attacks his mother Debbie Mathers for the lawsuit she filed for the lyrics of his breakthrough hit "My Name Is".

The opening lyric "Two trailer park girls go round the outside" is based on the hip-hop single "Buffalo Gals" by Malcolm McLaren. The introduction—"Obie Trice, real name, no gimmicks"—is sampled from Obie Trice's own track "Rap Name".

== Critical reception ==
Stephen Thomas Erlewine marked it as one of the best tracks on The Eminem Show. David Browne was positive: "'I've created a monster, 'cuz no one wants to hear Marshall no more,' he (Eminem) whines, partly in jest, in the beat-crazy single 'Without Me'." HipHopDX noted that the blazing single "Without Me" is one of the only light-hearted songs on the album. NME magazine noted that this song is "tackling disco." RapReviews wrote: "His fearlessness continues on the lead single "Without Me" when he lambasts everyone from Dick Cheney's wife to the leading electronic artists of the day." Kris Ex of Rolling Stone calls it "a fun-loving, barb-laden romp on which [Eminem] flits from one topic to the next like a bumblebee with ADD."

== Chart performances and awards ==
"Without Me" is one of Eminem's most successful singles. The song reached the number one position in the charts in numerous countries, including the United Kingdom, Australia, Ireland, and New Zealand for 7 weeks. In the United States, the song reached a peak of number two on the Billboard Hot 100, behind "Hot in Herre" by Nelly, although it reached number one on both the Mainstream Top 40 and Rhythmic charts. In the United Kingdom, Without Me made its debut at number 1, on the week ending 1 June 2002, selling over 165,500 copies in its first week.

"Without Me" was nominated for Record of the Year at the Grammy Awards of 2003 (losing to Norah Jones's song "Don't Know Why"), being Eminem's first song to receive a Grammy nomination in a major category. It also received a nomination for Best Male Rap Solo Performance, but lost that award as well to Nelly's "Hot in Herre", behind which it had peaked on the Billboard Hot 100.

In 2009, the song was honored by Pitchfork Media as the 251st-greatest song of the 2000s.

The song was the 69th-best-selling single of the 2000s in the United Kingdom.

Year	Organization	Award	Result
2002	MTV Video Music Awards	Video of the Year	Won
2002	MTV Video Music Awards	Best Male Video	Won
2002	MTV Video Music Awards	Best Rap Video	Won
2002	MTV Video Music Awards	Best Direction	Won
2002	MTV Video Music Awards	Best Editing	Nominated
2002	MTV Video Music Awards	Viewer's Choice Award	Nominated
2002	MTV Europe Music Awards	Best Video	Nominated
2003	Grammy Awards	Record of the Year	Nominated
2003	Grammy Awards	Best Male Rap Solo Performance	Nominated
2003	Grammy Awards	Best Music Video	Won
2003	Detroit Music Awards	Outstanding National Single	Nominated
2003	MTV Video Music Awards Japan	Video of the Year	Nominated
2003	MTV Video Music Awards Japan	Best Male Video	Nominated
2003	MTV Video Music Awards Japan	Best Hip-Hop Video	Nominated
2003	MTV Asia Awards	Favorite Video	Nominated
2003	Mnet Music Video Festival	Best International Artist	Won

== Music video ==
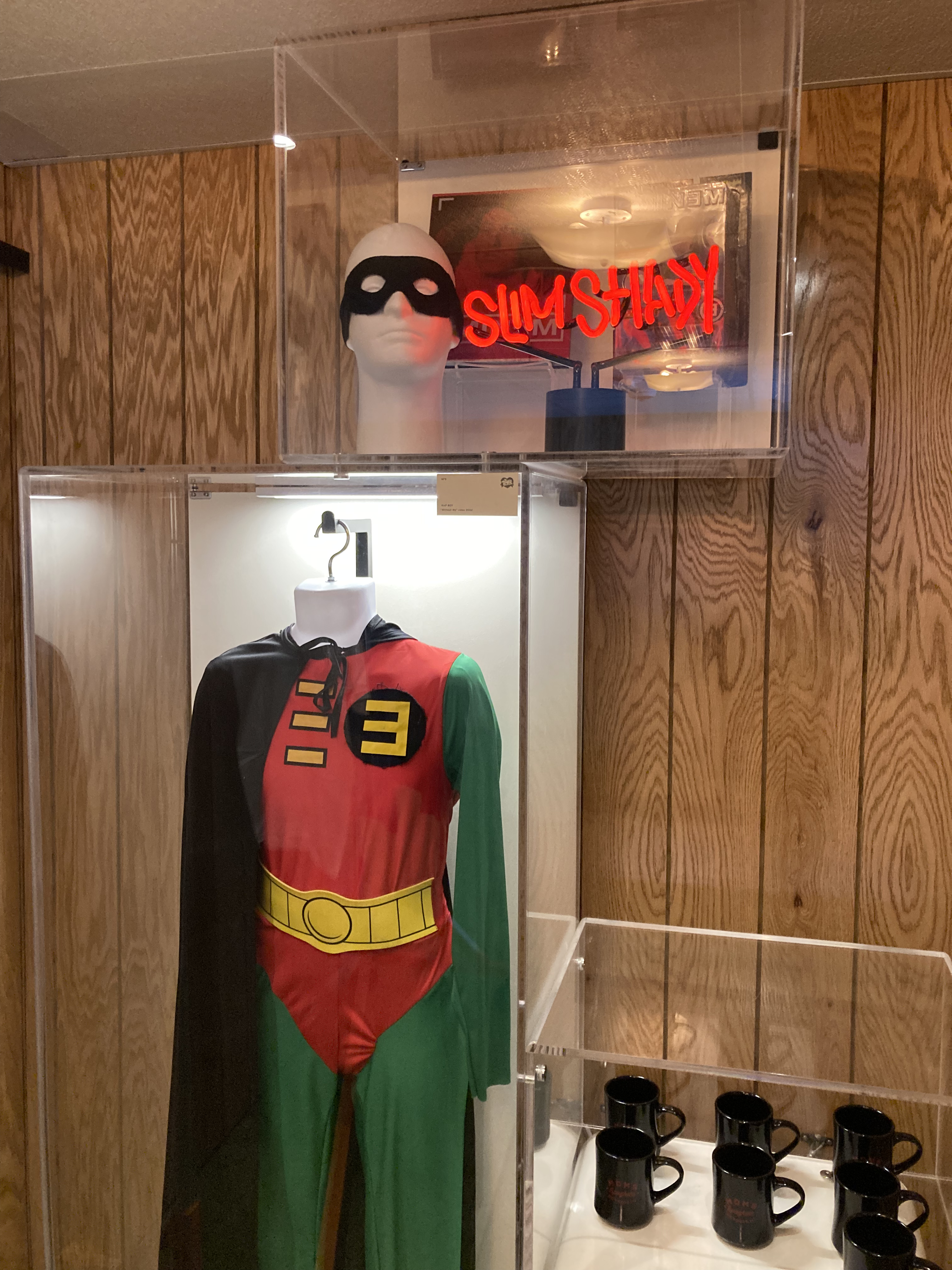
The Rap Boy suit from the Without Me music video at Mom's Spaghetti in Detroit.

The song's music video, directed by Joseph Kahn, features a number of scenarios built around its context, including Eminem and Dr. Dre as parodies of comic book characters in general, specifically Batman, Robin (Rap Boy), and Blade trying to save a child who bought a copy of The Eminem Show that has a Parental Advisory sticker. Rap Boy and Dre rush to the rescue before the child puts the CD in his CD player and when they arrive Rap Boy snatches it away from him, pointing out that the CD has explicit lyrics that are not suitable for him to listen to. The kid cries and is upset after Rap Boy and Dre confiscate the album. The video also features Eminem (as Slim Shady) appearing in a variety of fictional television shows, such as a parody of ER, an infomercial, The Real World, and a talk show. Supporting actors are the adult film performer Jenna Jameson, television host Kiana Tom and well as character actor Michael Berryman.

The video was shot from April 12–13 at Barwick Studios. It received MTV Video Music Awards for Video of the Year, Best Male Video, Best Rap Video, and Best Direction (for Joseph Kahn), as well as gaining nominations for Best Editing and Viewer's Choice. It also won Best Short Form Music Video at the Grammy Awards of 2003.

== Track listing ==
European CD single

No.	Title	Writer(s)	Producer(s)	Length
1.	"Without Me"	Marshall Mathers; Jeffrey Bass; Kevin Bell; Anne Dudley; Malcolm McLaren; Trevor Horn	Eminem; Jeff Bass^{[a]}; DJ Head^{[b]}	4:53
2.	"The Way I Am" (Danny Lohner remix) (featuring Marilyn Manson)	Mathers	Eminem	4:59
3.	"Without Me" (acapella)	Mathers; Bass; Bell; Dudley; McLaren; Horn	Eminem; Bass^{[a]}; DJ Head^{[b]}	4:53
4.	"Without Me" (instrumental)	Mathers; Bass; Bell; Dudley; McLaren; Horn	Eminem; Bass^{[a]}; DJ Head^{[b]}	4:53
Total length:				19:38

UK CD single

No.	Title	Writer(s)	Producer(s)	Length
1.	"Without Me"	Marshall Mathers; Jeffrey Bass; Kevin Bell; Anne Dudley; Malcolm McLaren; Trevor Horn	Eminem; Jeff Bass^{[a]}; DJ Head^{[b]}	4:53
2.	"The Way I Am" (Danny Lohner remix) (featuring Marilyn Manson)	Mathers	Eminem	4:59
3.	"Without Me" (instrumental)	Mathers; Bass; Bell; Dudley; McLaren; Horn	Eminem; Bass^{[a]}; DJ Head^{[b]}	4:53
Total length:				14:45

Australian CD single

No.	Title	Writer(s)	Producer(s)	Length
1.	"Without Me"	Marshall Mathers; Jeffrey Bass; Kevin Bell; Anne Dudley; Malcolm McLaren; Trevor Horn	Eminem; Jeff Bass^{[a]}; DJ Head^{[b]}	4:53
2.	"The Way I Am" (Danny Lohner remix) (featuring Marilyn Manson)	Mathers	Eminem	4:59
3.	"Without Me" (acapella)	Mathers; Bass; Bell; Dudley; McLaren; Horn	Eminem; Bass^{[a]}; DJ Head^{[b]}	4:53
4.	"Without Me" (instrumental)	Mathers; Bass; Bell; Dudley; McLaren; Horn	Eminem; Bass^{[a]}; DJ Head^{[b]}	4:53
5.	"Say What You Say" (featuring Dr. Dre)	Mathers; Andre Young; Theron Feemster; Mike Elizondo	Dr. Dre	5:09
6.	"Without Me" (video)	Mathers; Bass; Bell; Dudley; McLaren; Horn	Eminem; Bass^{[a]}; DJ Head^{[b]}	4:53
Total length:				29:40

Notes

- ^{^[a]} signifies a co-Record producer.
- ^{^[b]} signifies an additional producer.

== Charts ==
=== Weekly charts ===
2002 weekly chart performance for "Without Me"
Chart (2002)	Peak position
Australia (ARIA)	1
Australian Urban (ARIA)	1
Austria (Ö3 Austria Top 40)	1
Belgium (Ultratop 50 Flanders)	2
Belgium (Ultratop 50 Wallonia)	1
Brazil (ABPD)	2
Canada (Nielsen SoundScan)	4
Croatia (HRT)	1
Czech Republic (IFPI)	5
Denmark (Tracklisten)	1
Europe (European Hot 100)	1
Finland (Suomen virallinen lista)	2
France (SNEP)	3
Germany (GfK)	1
Greece (IFPI)	6
Hungary (Rádiós Top 40)	6
Hungary (Single Top 40)	2
Ireland (IRMA)	1
Italy (FIMI)	2
Latvia (Latvian Airplay Top 50)	2
Netherlands (Dutch Top 40)	1
Netherlands (Single Top 100)	1
New Zealand (Recorded Music NZ)	1
Norway (VG-lista)	1
Scottish Singles Sales (Official Charts)	1
Spain (Promusicae)	2
Sweden (Sverigetopplistan)	1
Switzerland (Schweizer Hitparade)	1
UK Singles (Official Charts)	1
UK Hip Hop/R&B (Official Charts)	1
US Billboard Hot 100	2
US Alternative Airplay (Billboard)	15
US Hot R&B/Hip-Hop Songs (Billboard)	13
US Hot Rap Songs (Billboard)	5
US Pop Airplay (Billboard)	1
US Rhythmic Airplay (Billboard)	1

2016 weekly chart performance for "Without Me"
Chart (2016)	Peak position
Czech Republic Singles Digital (ČNS IFPI)	72

2021–2024 weekly chart performance for "Without Me"
Chart (2021–2026)	Peak position
Canada Hot 100 (Billboard)	46
Czech Republic Singles Digital (ČNS IFPI)	46
Global 200 (Billboard)	39
Lithuania (AGATA)	38
Poland (Polish Airplay Top 100)	97
Poland (Polish Streaming Top 100)	88
Slovakia (Singles Digitál Top 100)	46
UK Hip Hop/R&B (Official Charts)	40

=== Monthly charts ===
Monthly chart performance
Chart (2025)	Peak position
Russia Streaming (TopHit)	92

=== Year-end charts ===
2002 year-end chart performance for "Without Me"
Chart (2002)	Position
Australia (ARIA)	1
Australian Urban (ARIA)	1
Austria (Ö3 Austria Top 40)	3
Belgium (Ultratop 50 Flanders)	7
Belgium (Ultratop 50 Wallonia)	8
Brazil (Crowley)	16
Canada (Nielsen SoundScan) USI release	67
Canada (Nielsen SoundScan) RCKT release	111
Europe (Eurochart Hot 100)	3
Finland (Suomen virallinen lista)	11
France (SNEP)	15
Germany (Official German Charts)	4
Ireland (IRMA)	7
Italy (FIMI)	12
Netherlands (Dutch Top 40)	18
Netherlands (Single Top 100)	10
New Zealand (Recorded Music NZ)	4
Sweden (Sverigetopplistan)	6
Switzerland (Swiss Hitparade)	3
UK Singles (OCC)	10
UK Airplay (Music Week)	37
US Billboard Hot 100	21
US Hot R&B/Hip-Hop Songs (Billboard)	79

2022 year-end chart performance for "Without Me"
Chart (2022)	Position
Australia (ARIA)	56
Global 200 (Billboard)	63
Lithuania (AGATA)	35
Switzerland (Schweizer Hitparade)	89

2023 year-end chart performance for "Without Me"
Chart (2023)	Position
Australia (ARIA)	91
Global 200 (Billboard)	83
Poland (Polish Streaming Top 100)	96
Switzerland (Schweizer Hitparade)	78

2024 year-end chart performance for "Without Me"
Chart (2024)	Position
Australia Hip Hop/R&B (ARIA)	20
Global 200 (Billboard)	78

2025 year-end chart performance for "Without Me"
Chart (2025)	Position
Global 200 (Billboard)	106

=== Decade-end charts ===
Decade-end chart performance for "Without Me"
Chart (2000–2009)	Position
Australia (ARIA)	16
Germany (Official German Charts)	10
Netherlands (Single Top 100)	69

== Certifications and sales ==
Certifications and sales for "Without Me"
Region	Certification	Certified units/sales
Australia (ARIA)	17× Platinum	1,190,000^{‡}
Austria (IFPI Austria)	4× Platinum	120,000^{*}
Belgium (BRMA)	Platinum	50,000^{*}
Brazil (Pro-Música Brasil)	Platinum	60,000^{‡}
Denmark (IFPI Danmark)	3× Platinum	270,000^{‡}
Finland	—	4,874
France (SNEP)	Gold	250,000^{*}
Germany (BVMI)	Platinum	500,000^{‡}
Italy (FIMI) sales since 2009	3× Platinum	300,000^{‡}
Japan (RIAJ)	Gold	100,000^{*}
New Zealand (RMNZ)	8× Platinum	240,000^{‡}
Norway (IFPI Norway)	2× Platinum	
Portugal (AFP)	4× Platinum	40,000^{‡}
Spain (Promusicae)	2× Platinum	120,000^{‡}
Sweden (GLF)	Platinum	30,000^{^}
Switzerland (IFPI Switzerland)	Platinum	40,000^{^}
United Kingdom (BPI)	5× Platinum	3,000,000^{‡}
United States (RIAA)	7× Platinum	7,000,000^{‡}
Streaming
Greece (IFPI Greece)	2× Platinum	4,000,000^{†}
^{*} Sales figures based on certification alone.^{^} Shipments figures based on certification alone.^{‡} Sales+streaming figures based on certification alone.^{†} Streaming-only figures based on certification alone.

== In popular culture ==
- The song is included in the soundtrack for the 2016 film Suicide Squad.
- Attorney Alex Spiro in a court filing for Elon Musk against the Securities and Exchange Commission to rescind a SEC decree requiring Musk's tweets about Tesla to be reviewed before posting, quoted "(SEC) won't let me be or let me be me so let me see; They tried to shut me down", replacing FCC with SEC.
- In 2024, Eminem sampled "Without Me" for his song "Houdini". The music video also pays heavy homage to the video for "Without Me".
- The Detroit Red Wings began using the song as their goal song at the beginning of the 2023–2024 season.
- Following his return as Reform UK leader during the 2024 United Kingdom General Election, Nigel Farage used the song as his personal campaign theme. "Without Me" was further used in his social media videos as well as during the build up to his leader's speech at the Reform Annual Conference in September 2024.
- In 2026, Colombian rapper Koddy G samples this song in a Spanish rap song called "Peli de Terror" which became viral, also he mentioned Eminem could demand him for the sample on his lyrics.

== See also ==
- List of best-selling singles in Australia
