= 8 Mile (film) =

2002 film by Curtis Hanson

- Theatrical release poster
- Directed by: Curtis Hanson
- Written by: Scott Silver
- Produced by: Curtis Hanson; Brian Grazer; Jimmy Iovine
- Starring: Eminem; Kim Basinger; Brittany Murphy; Mekhi Phifer
- Cinematography: Rodrigo Prieto
- Edited by: Jay Rabinowitz; Craig Kitson
- Music by: Eminem
- Production company: Imagine Entertainment
- Distributed by: Universal Pictures
- Release date: November 8, 2002 (United States)
- Running time: 110 minutes
- Country: United States
- Language: English
- Budget: $41 million
- Box office: $242.9 million

8 Mile is a 2002 American drama film produced and directed by Curtis Hanson from a script written by Scott Silver. It stars Eminem in his feature film debut, alongside Kim Basinger, Brittany Murphy, and Mekhi Phifer. Containing autobiographical elements from Eminem's life, the film follows Detroit rapper Jimmy Smith Jr., also known as B-Rabbit, as he attempts to launch a career in hip-hop, a music genre dominated by African Americans. The title is derived from 8 Mile Road, the road between the predominantly black city of Detroit and the largely white suburban communities to the north that Eminem originally lived in.

8 Mile was released by Universal Pictures on November 8, 2002, in the United States. The film received positive reviews and was a commercial success, grossing $242.9 million worldwide. The film's accompanying soundtrack (released by Universal's then subsidiary Universal Music, through Interscope and Shady/Aftermath) was also a commercial success, being certified quadruple platinum by the Recording Industry Association of America (RIAA). The film garnered numerous award nominations and wins, including an Academy Award for Best Original Song win for "Lose Yourself" for Eminem, Jeff Bass and Luis Resto at the 75th Academy Awards. 8 Mile was named one of the best films of 2002 by several publications.

== Plot ==
In 1995, aspiring rapper Jimmy Smith Jr. performs under the stage name "B-Rabbit". A blue-collar worker, Jimmy has moved to the run-down Detroit trailer home of his alcoholic mother, Stephanie, after breaking up with his previous girlfriend, Janeane. He also lives with his younger sister Lily, and Stephanie's abusive live-in boyfriend, Greg, who is later revealed as a former schoolmate of Jimmy's. Although encouraged by his friends, Jimmy doubts his potential as a rapper. One night, Jimmy develops stage fright during a rap battle at a local venue, the Shelter, hosted by his best friend David Porter, another aspiring rapper who performs under the stage name "Future", and leaves the stage humiliated.

Desperate for money, he requests extra shifts at his day job at a car factory, but his supervisor, Manny, bluntly declines because of Jimmy's habitual tardiness. After later befriending a woman named Alex Latourno, he begins taking more initiative. Discovering an eviction notice as Jimmy is preparing for work, Stephanie decides to conceal it from Greg, because he (Greg) has an incoming large settlement check from a prior accident, which she hopes will buy her and Lily a new house.

Jimmy's friendship with fellow trailer park resident Wink, a radio DJ who is acquainted with a record label promoter, becomes strained after he discovers that Wink is promoting his rivals, a rap group known as "Leaders of the Free World" to whom he had lost the rap battle. One day, Jimmy and his companions violently brawl with the Free World crew. The scuffle is disrupted when Jimmy's slow-witted yet loyal friend, Cheddar Bob, threatens them with a gun but accidentally shoots himself in the crotch.

During a lunch break at work, one of Jimmy's co-workers performs a freestyle rap insulting his co-worker Paul due to his insinuated homosexuality, along with some of the other workers. Jimmy defends Paul with his own freestyle rap, and the positive reception from the coworkers boosts his confidence. Alex arrives, impressed by his talent, and they have sex. One day, Greg discovers the eviction notice and confronts Stephanie about it. When Jimmy punches Greg for pushing his mother to the ground, they get into a fight, ending in Greg leaving Stephanie for good. After Jimmy finds Stephanie lying on the porch, intoxicated, and brings her inside, the two argue over Jimmy's actions, and Stephanie furiously ejects Jimmy from the trailer.

Wink arranges for Jimmy to meet with producers at a recording studio, but upon encountering him having sex with Alex, an enraged Jimmy attacks him while she attempts to defuse the situation. Wink and the Free World crew retaliatorily bully and assault Jimmy outside his trailer. The crew's leader, Papa Doc, holds Jimmy at gunpoint and threatens to kill him, but Wink convinces him not to do it. After the group leaves Jimmy alone, Stephanie arrives with enough money to pay the rent to avoid eviction after winning $3,200 at a bingo tournament, and the two reconcile.

Future encourages Jimmy to exact revenge against the Free World crew at the next rap battle. Jimmy agrees, but Manny, having noticed his improvements at work, asks Jimmy to work a late-night shift. Jimmy agrees, although it conflicts with the battle at the Shelter. An unexpected visit from Alex at work motivates him to participate, as she is relocating to New York afterward. Paul agrees to cover the start of Jimmy's overnight shift on his behalf.

After handily winning the first two battle rounds against Free World crew members Lyckety-Splyt and Lotto, he faces Papa Doc. Going first, Jimmy pre-empts Papa Doc's potential insults, acknowledging his own "white trash" roots and difficult life, using that as a springboard to expose Papa Doc's "thug" persona as fraudulent by revealing his real name as Clarence, and that he grew up in a wealthy suburb, attended private school, and still lives with his stable, happily married parents. Embarrassed and rendered speechless, Papa Doc concedingly hands the microphone back to Future. Congratulated by Alex and his friends, Jimmy is offered a position by Future as a co-host of rap battles at the Shelter. Jimmy declines, saying that hosting is Future's thing, and he needs to do his own, departing to return to work.

== Cast ==
- Eminem as James "Jimmy" Smith Jr., a rapper who uses the stage name "B-Rabbit"
- Kim Basinger as Stephanie Smith, Jimmy and Lily's mother
- Mekhi Phifer as David Porter a.k.a. Future, Jimmy's best friend and the rap battle host
- Brittany Murphy as Alex Latourno, Jimmy's love interest
- Evan Jones as Cheddar Bob, Jimmy's slow-witted yet loyal friend
- Anthony Mackie as Clarence a.k.a. Papa Doc, leader of the Free World
- Omar Benson Miller as Sol George, Jimmy's friend and Iz's brother
- De'Angelo Wilson as DJ Iz, Jimmy's friend and Sol's brother
- Eugene Byrd as Wink, a radio DJ who betrays B-Rabbit by having sex with Alex
- Taryn Manning as Janeane, Jimmy's ex-girlfriend
- DJ Head as Battle DJ
- Michael Shannon as Greg Buehl, Stephanie's abusive boyfriend and former schoolmate of Jimmy and Future
- Chloe Greenfield as Lily Smith, Jimmy's sister
- Multiple cameos, including:
  - Brandon T. Jackson
  - Proof
  - Obie Trice
  - Njeri Earth
  - Xzibit

== Production ==
8 Mile started production in 2000. Shooting began in September 2001 in Highland Park, Michigan. Producer Brian Grazer had an idea of a hip-hop film as he wanted to put audiences in the world like Saturday Night Fever did, and happened to see Eminem on MTV. According to Paul Rosenberg (Eminem's manager), both Quentin Tarantino and Danny Boyle were considered to direct; while Boyle came close, Eminem felt he had a better connection with Curtis Hanson.

Hanson explained that his bond with Eminem began when they discussed their shared vision for 8 Mile. Eminem's admiration for Hanson's earlier films, The Hand That Rocks the Cradle (1992) and L.A. Confidential (1997), helped build trust. Hanson noted that Eminem didn't want a vanity project; instead, he sought to be part of a meaningful film. Initially, Hanson was cautious about casting him, worried that Eminem's reputation could be a liability. He recalled a remark from actor Russell Crowe, who had previously worked with Hanson, upon hearing about the project: “Good idea, Curtis. But who are you going to get to play Eminem?” highlighting the risk of whether Eminem could carry the film as an actor. Ultimately, Hanson was won over by Eminem's natural charisma, particularly in his expressive eyes, a quality Hanson described as essential for engaging audiences and carrying the story.

Eminem turned down roles for both Training Day and The Fast and the Furious in order to star in the movie. Seth Rogen and Jason Segel both auditioned for Cheddar Bob. Mekhi Phifer was initially reluctant about appearing in the film as he felt that the character didn't feel right for him, in addition to feeling that the concept was made to cash in on Eminem's popularity. He was also reluctant to board a flight after the September 11 attacks. Ultimately, he accepted the role after he read the script.

Hanson said that Eminem was involved in 8 Mile from the project's inception, as writer Scott Silver developed the script with him in mind. Early drafts, however, lacked a strong connection to Detroit and set Eminem's character as a hotel bellboy. Hanson reworked the script to ground it in Detroit's identity, moving the character to an automotive stamping plant, shifting the timeline to 1995, and adding elements like the local radio station and arson scenes emblematic of the city's struggles. While Eminem's input on the script was limited to initial discussions, Hanson collaborated with him closely during rehearsals, particularly on the rap battles, explaining their thematic significance as Eminem crafted lyrics, including the theme song “Lose Yourself.” Hanson emphasized authentic casting, bringing in Detroit locals and fostering a bond among the actors, most of whom were new to film. Their group name, 3 1/3, emerged organically during rehearsals, symbolizing Detroit's 313 area code and a deeper commentary on identity and unity. For Hanson, the goal was to create an authentic portrayal of this world, finding performers who could fully embody their characters.

Music producer Damizza revealed that Eminem originally asked Mariah Carey to play the role of Stephanie Smith. Carey turned down the role which was eventually played by Kim Basinger.

During the final rap battle scene between B-Rabbit and Papa Doc, Eminem used Anthony Mackie's real personal life information after he searched him on Google and used them to make fun of Doc in the scene.

== Music ==
8 Mile: Music from and Inspired by the Motion Picture is the soundtrack to 8 Mile. Eminem features on five tracks from the album. It was released under the Shady/Interscope label and spawned Eminem's first number 1 US single "Lose Yourself". The album debuted at number one on the U.S. Billboard 200 Albums Chart that year, with over 702,000 copies sold, and a further 507,000 copies were sold in the second week, also finishing the year as the fifth-best-selling album of 2002, with US sales of 3.2 million despite being on the market for only two months.

== Reception ==
=== Box office ===
8 Mile opened with $51,240,555 in its opening weekend, at the time the second-highest opening for an R-rated movie in the U.S., after Hannibal. The film would hold the record for having the highest November opening weekend for an R-rated film until 2024 when Gladiator II surpassed it. It topped the box office upon opening, beating The Santa Clause 2. During its second weekend, the film dropped into second place behind Harry Potter and the Chamber of Secrets, making $21.3 million. The film would go on to gross $116,750,901 domestically and $126,124,177 overseas, for a total of $242,875,078 worldwide. The film's final domestic gross would hold the film at No. 3 in Box Office Mojo's "Pop Star Debuts" list, behind Austin Powers in Goldmember (Beyoncé) and The Bodyguard (Whitney Houston).

In Slovenia, the film made an opening gross of $18,000, making it the fourth-highest opening for a Universal film in the country, behind Twister, The Lost World: Jurassic Park and Bridget Jones's Diary. In Austria, it was Universal's second-highest opening in the country at the time, behind American Pie 2. Then, 8 Mile beat The Lord of the Rings: The Two Towers to reach the number one spot in the UK, collecting a total of $7.2 million in its opening weekend.

=== Critical reception ===
8 Mile received positive reviews, with critics praising the music and Eminem's performance. On the review aggregator website Rotten Tomatoes, 76% of 211 critics' reviews are positive, with an average rating of 6.7/10. The website's consensus reads: "Even though the story is overly familiar, there's enough here for an engaging ride." Metacritic, which uses a weighted average, assigned the film a score of 77 out of 100, based on 38 critics, indicating "generally favorable" reviews. CinemaScore polls conducted during the opening weekend revealed the average grade cinemagoers gave 8 Mile was "B+" on an A+ to F scale, with the core under-21 demographics giving it an A.

Roger Ebert gave the film three out of four. He said that we "are hardly started in 8 Mile, and already we see that this movie stands aside from routine debut films by pop stars" and that it is "a faithful reflection of his myth". He said that Eminem, as an actor, is "convincing without being too electric" and "survives the X-ray truth-telling of the movie camera". In the At the Movies with Ebert and Roeper review, both Ebert and Richard Roeper gave the film a thumbs up; Roeper said that Eminem has a "winning screen presence" and "raw magic" to him. He was happy with Rabbit's "tender side" presented through his relationship with the "adorable" Greenfield as his sister, but felt that Basinger was "really miscast". Roeper said: "8 Mile probably won't win converts to rap, but it should thrill Eminem fans". Eleanor Ringel Cater of The Atlanta Constitution gave the film a C, saying "As music star movie debuts go, 8 Mile is hardly A Hard Day's Night, but it's not Crossroads, either".

Peter Travers gave the film three and a half out of four. He said that 8 Mile "is a real movie, not a fast-buck package to exploit the fan base of a rap nonentity" that "qualifies as a cinematic event by tapping into the roots of Eminem and the fury and feeling that inform his rap." He praised Hanson's directing and the performances and compared the final battle with Papa Doc to the fight between Rocky Balboa and Apollo Creed in Rocky.

=== Top lists ===
8 Mile has been named in various year-end and all-time top lists:

- 2nd – Billboard (Erika Ramirez): Top 10 Best Hip-Hop Movies Ever
- 7th – The New York Observer (Andrew Sarris): The 10 Best English-Language Films of 2002
- 9th – Time (Richard Schickel): Top 10 Movies of 2002
- 10th – Rolling Stone (Peter Travers): The Best Movies of 2002
- N/A – The Daily Californian: Best Films of 2002

=== Awards and honors ===
In 2003, Eminem won the Academy Award for Best Original Song at the 75th Academy Awards, for his single "Lose Yourself" from the soundtrack of 8 Mile, becoming the first solo rapper ever to win an Academy Award. He was not present at the ceremony, but co-writer Luis Resto accepted the award. The film has been nominated for 32 awards, winning 11. Seventeen years later, Eminem performed the song in a surprise appearance at the 92nd Academy Awards.

Year	Award	Category	Result	Recipient
2003	Academy Award	Best Original Song – "Lose Yourself"	Won	Eminem, Luis Resto and Jeff Bass
2003	Black Reel Awards	Best Original Soundtrack	Nominated	8 Mile
2003	BMI	Film Award for Music	Won	Eminem
2003	BMI	Most Performed Song from a Film – "Lose Yourself"	Won	Eminem
2003	Broadcast Film Critics Association Awards	Critics Choice Award for Best Song – "Lose Yourself"	Won	Eminem
2003	CNOMA Awards	Best Make-Up Artist for a Feature Film	Nominated	Donald Mowat
2003	Chicago Film Critics Association Awards	Most Promising Performer	Nominated	Eminem
2003	European Film Awards	Screen International Award	Nominated	Curtis Hanson
2003	Golden Globe Award	Best Original Song – "Lose Yourself"	Nominated	Eminem
2003	Golden Globe Award	Best Music	Nominated	8 Mile
2003	Golden Globe Award	Best of Show	Nominated	8 Mile
2003	Golden Trailer Awards	Most Original	Nominated	8 Mile
2003	Golden Reel Award	Best Sound Editing in a Feature – Music – Musical	Nominated	Carlton Kaller
2003	Hollywood Makeup Artist and Hair Stylist Guild Awards	Best Contemporary Makeup – Feature	Nominated	Donald Mowat, Ronnie Specter, Matiki Anoff
2003	MTV Movie Awards	Best Movie	Nominated	8 Mile
2003	MTV Movie Awards	Best Male Performance	Won	Eminem
2003	MTV Movie Awards	Breakthrough Male Performance	Won	Eminem
2003	Online Film Critics Society Awards	Best Breakthrough Performance	Nominated	Eminem
2003	Phoenix Film Critics Society Awards	Best Original Song – "Lose Yourself"	Nominated	Eminem
2003	Satellite Awards	Best Original Song – "Lose Yourself"	Nominated	Eminem
2003	Teen Choice Awards	Choice Movie: Drama	Nominated	8 Mile
2003	Teen Choice Awards	Choice Movie Actor: Drama	Won	Eminem
2003	Teen Choice Awards	Choice Movie: Male Breakout Star	Won	Eminem
2003	Teen Choice Awards	Choice Crossover Artist	Nominated	Eminem
2003	Teen Choice Awards	Choice Movie: Liplock	Nominated	Eminem and Brittany Murphy
2003	World Soundtrack Awards	Best Original Song Written for a Film – "Lose Yourself"	Nominated	Eminem
2004	ASCAP Awards	Most Performed Song from a Motion Picture – "Lose Yourself"	Won	Eminem
2004	Grammy Award	Grammy Award for Record of the Year – "Lose Yourself"	Nominated	Eminem
2004	Grammy Award	Grammy Award for Song of the Year – "Lose Yourself"	Nominated	Jeff Bass, Eminem & Luis Resto
2004	Grammy Award	Grammy Award for Best Rap Song – "Lose Yourself"	Won	Jeff Bass, Eminem & Luis Resto
2004	Grammy Award	Grammy Award for Best Male Rap Solo Performance – "Lose Yourself"	Won	Eminem
2004	Grammy Award	Grammy Award for Best Song Written for Visual Media – "Lose Yourself"	Nominated	Jeff Bass, Eminem & Luis Resto

The film is recognized by American Film Institute in these lists:

- 2004: AFI's 100 Years...100 Songs:
  - "Lose Yourself" – No. 93

== Home media ==
8 Mile was first released on VHS and DVD on March 18, 2003. A UMD version was released on November 15, 2005. The DVD release generated $75 million in sales and rentals in its first week, making it the biggest DVD debut ever for an R-rated movie and putting it in the all-time Top 10 for first week home video sales for a movie. The film was later released on Blu-ray on April 14, 2009. It was released on Ultra HD Blu-ray on November 8, 2022, for the 20th anniversary of the theatrical release.

== See also ==
- List of hood films

== Sources ==
- Bozza, Anthony (2003). Whatever You Say I Am: The Life and Times of Eminem. New York: Crown Publishing Group. ISBN 1-4000-5059-6.
