= 'Till I Collapse =

Song by Eminem featuring Nate Dogg

from the album The Eminem Show
- Released: May 26, 2002
- Recorded: September 2001 - January 2002
- Genre: Rap rock
- Length: 4:58 (album version); 5:45 (instrumental version)
- Label: Aftermath; Shady; Interscope
- Songwriters: Marshall Mathers; Nathaniel Hale; Luis Resto; Brian May
- Producer: Eminem

"'Till I Collapse" is a song by the American rapper Eminem featuring Nate Dogg. It was originally released as a part of Eminem's fourth studio album The Eminem Show (2002). Without having been released as a single, the song charted numerous times worldwide and has become one of Eminem's most popular songs.

== Background ==
Although it has never been released as a single, it has charted on a few occasions when other Eminem albums have been released. In 2012, it was certified double-platinum by the Recording Industry Association of America for selling 2,000,000 copies in the United States. This was followed by quintuple-platinum in 2018 and octuple-platinum in 2022.

The song interpolates the 1977 song "We Will Rock You" by British rock band Queen; as a result, Brian May is credited as a songwriter.

== Reception and legacy ==
In a retrospective review, David Drake of Complex highlighted "'Till I Collapse" as demonstrating Eminem's musical evolution on The Eminem Show, noting how the "increasingly dramatic production choices" on songs like "'Till I Collapse" show him "abandoning some of the more irreverent cartoonishness in favor of capital-I Importance". Drake commended "Nate Dogg’s urgent hook and some of the most elaborate-yet-purposeful rapping of Eminem’s career" as saving "what should have been a leaden monster, as the bass-heavy funk of the Bass Brothers and Dr. Dre was dropping away in favor of arena-ready epics".

== In popular culture ==
When Eminem's single "Shake That" (also featuring Nate Dogg) was released in 2006, several Eminem songs re-charted that same week, including "'Till I Collapse". It charted in the UK at number 192 on April 15, 2006.

In 2009, it was used in an advertisement for the game Call of Duty: Modern Warfare 2. It raised digital download sales of the song worldwide considerably, but in Britain the song sold so many copies after the ad aired that it re-charted that week (November 21, 2009) at number 73, a new peak. The Major League Baseball pitcher Jesse Litsch used the song as his entrance music during the 2011 season. In 2023, the song was used in the multiplayer trailer for Call of Duty: Modern Warfare III. The Major League Baseball pitcher Justin Verlander uses the song as his entrance music.

== Charts ==
Chart (2006–2018)	Peak position
Canadian Digital Songs (Billboard)	30
Irish Singles Chart	77
Slovakia Singles Digital (ČNS IFPI)	100
Sweden Heatseeker (Sverigetopplistan)	3
UK Singles (OCC)	73
US Digital Song Sales (Billboard)	35

Chart (2022–2023)	Peak position
Australia (ARIA)	92
Czech Republic Singles Digital (ČNS IFPI)	84
Germany (GfK)	99
Global 200 (Billboard)	115
Hungary (Single Top 40)	26
Slovakia Singles Digital (ČNS IFPI)	100
Portugal (AFP)	170
Slovakia (Singles Digitál Top 100)	82

== Certifications ==
Region	Certification	Certified units/sales
Australia (ARIA)	9× Platinum	630,000^{‡}
Austria (IFPI Austria)	3× Platinum	90,000^{*}
Brazil (Pro-Música Brasil)	Gold	30,000^{‡}
Denmark (IFPI Danmark)	2× Platinum	180,000^{‡}
Germany (BVMI)	3× Gold	750,000^{‡}
Italy (FIMI)	2× Platinum	100,000^{‡}
New Zealand (RMNZ)	6× Platinum	180,000^{‡}
Portugal (AFP)	2× Platinum	80,000^{‡}
Spain (Promusicae)	2× Platinum	120,000^{‡}
United Kingdom (BPI)	3× Platinum	1,800,000^{‡}
United States (RIAA)	8× Platinum	8,000,000^{‡}
Streaming
Denmark (IFPI Danmark)	Platinum	1,800,000^{†}
Greece (IFPI Greece)	Platinum	2,000,000^{†}
^{*} Sales figures based on certification alone.^{‡} Sales+streaming figures based on certification alone.^{†} Streaming-only figures based on certification alone.
