= 8 Mile: Music from and Inspired by the Motion Picture =

Soundtrack album by Various artists
- Released: October 29, 2002
- Recorded: 2001–2002
- Genre: Hip-hop
- Length: 68:10
- Labels: Shady; Interscope
- Producers: Eminem; Chucky Thompson; Dante Ross; DJ Premier; Guru; Jeff Bass; John Gamble; J-Praize; Kellin Manning; Luis Resto; Martin Pradler; Mel-Man; Mike Elizondo; Mr. Porter; Nas; Red Spyda; Sha Money XL

More Music from 8 Mile cover

Singles from 8 Mile: Music from and Inspired by the Motion Picture
- 1. "Lose Yourself" Released: October 28, 2002; 2. "Rap Game" Released: October 22, 2002; 3. "Wanksta" Released: November 5, 2002; 4. "8 Mile" Released: December 15, 2002

8 Mile: Music from and Inspired by the Motion Picture is the official soundtrack album to the 2002 film of the same name. The album, performed by various artists, was released by Universal Pictures's then subsidiary Universal Music, through Interscope and Shady Records. It spawned the commercially successful single "Lose Yourself" by Eminem, who also stars in the semi-autobiographical movie.

The album also spawned a follow-up soundtrack, More Music from 8 Mile, consisting of songs that appear in the film and were released as singles during the film's time setting of 1995. One of the songs was performed by 2Pac, who would be the subject of a documentary with a soundtrack produced by Eminem, who also produced a posthumous album by 2Pac. The album also features four songs by Wu-Tang Clan and its members, and two songs by Mobb Deep, who eventually signed to G-Unit Records. Both albums were also made available in censored versions, removing most of the strong language, sexual, and violent content.

8 Mile: Music from and Inspired by the Motion Picture debuted at number one on the Billboard 200, selling over 700,000 copies in its first week. It sold 510,000 copies in its second week and eventually became the fifth best-selling album in the US of 2002, with sales of 3.4 million copies. It is certified sextuple platinum by the Recording Industry Association of America (RIAA). The album featured the number-one song "Lose Yourself", which won the Oscar for Best Original Song. In 2024, the soundtrack was included in Rolling Stone's list of the 101 Greatest Soundtracks of All Time.

== Singles ==
- "Lose Yourself" was released as the soundtrack's lead single on October 28, 2002.
- "Wanksta" was released as the soundtrack's second single on "12 on November 5.
- "8 Mile" was released as a promotional single on December 15.
- "Rap Name" by Obie Trice was released as a single on "12 on October 22, 2002 and was included on the album's special edition bonus CD.

== Critical reception ==
Professional ratings
Aggregate scores
Source	Rating
Metacritic	74/100
Review scores
Source	Rating
AllMusic	4/5 stars
Empire	4/5 stars
Entertainment Weekly	B−
HipHopDX	4/5
Hot Press	4/5
NME	7/10
Q	4/5 stars
RapReviews	7.5/10
Rolling Stone	4/5 stars
Uncut	4/5 stars

According to the review aggregator Metacritic, 8 Mile: Music from and Inspired by the Motion Picture received "generally favorable reviews" based on a weighted average score of 74 out of 100 from 13 critic scores.

Eminem received praise from hip-hop producers and pundits for including authentic, era-appropriate beats in the film, despite the expense associated with clearance relative to original music bearing a similar sound.

In 2024, the soundtrack was included in Rolling Stone's list of the 101 Greatest Soundtracks of All Time.

== Commercial performance ==
The album debuted at number one on the Billboard 200 with over 702,000 copies sold in the 1st week and 510,000 copies sold in the 2nd week also finishing the year as the 5th best-selling album of 2002 with US sales of over 3.4 million. As of July 2013, it has sold 4,922,000 copies in the U.S. As of January 2016, the soundtrack has sold 11 million copies worldwide.

It debuted at number one on the Canadian Albums Chart with sales of 45,000 copies. It also reached number one on the UK Compilations Chart Australian ARIAnet Albums Chart.

== Track listing ==
=== 8 Mile ===
No.	Title	Writer(s)	Producer(s)	Length
1.	"Lose Yourself" (Eminem)	Marshall Mathers; Jeffrey Bass; Luis Resto (music); Marshall Mathers (lyrics)	Eminem; Jeffrey Bass; Luis Resto^{[a]}	5:20
2.	"Love Me" (Eminem, Obie Trice and 50 Cent)	Mathers; Obie Trice; Curtis Jackson; Resto; Steven King	Eminem; Resto^{[a]}	4:30
3.	"8 Mile" (Eminem)	Mathers; Resto	Eminem; Resto^{[a]}	5:57
4.	"Adrenaline Rush" (Obie Trice)	Trice; Andy Thelusma	Red Spyda	3:48
5.	"Places to Go" (50 Cent)	Jackson; Mathers; Resto	Eminem	4:15
6.	"Rap Game" (D12 featuring 50 Cent)	Mathers; Denaun Porter; Von Carlisle; Ondre Moore; Rufus Johnson; DeShaun Holton; Resto	Eminem; Denaun Porter	5:53
7.	"8 Miles and Runnin'" (Jay-Z featuring Freeway)	Shawn Carter; Leslie Pridgen; Mathers; Resto	Eminem	4:08
8.	"Spit Shine" (Xzibit)	Alvin Joiner; Denaun Porter; Resto	Denaun Porter	3:39
9.	"Time of My Life" (Macy Gray)	Natalie McIntyre; Dante Ross; Mike Elizondo	Ross; John Gamble; Elizondo^{[b]}	4:21
10.	"U Wanna Be Me" (Nas)	Nasir Jones; Carl Thompson	Chucky Thompson; Nas	3:50
11.	"Wanksta" (50 Cent)	Jackson; John "J-Praize" Freeman; Michael Clervoix	John "J-Praize" Freeman; Sha Money XL	3:38
12.	"Wasting My Time" (Boomkat)	Taryn Manning; Kellin Manning	Kellin Manning; Martin Pradler	3:37
13.	"R.A.K.I.M." (Rakim)	William Griffin; Denaun Porter; Lawrence King	Denaun Porter	4:23
14.	"That's My Nigga Fo' Real" (Young Zee)	Dewayne Battle; Ross	Ross; Gamble	4:45
15.	"Battle" (Gang Starr)	Christopher Martin; Keith Elam; Jones; Albert Johnson; Shawn Moltke; Marlon Williams; Kejaun Muchita; Kiam Holley; Percy Chapman; Jermaine Baxter; Cory McKay; Samuel Barnes; Jean-Claude Olivier; Shalena Bratcher; Asiah Lewis; Ryan Montgomery; Freddie Byrd	DJ Premier; Guru^{[b]}	2:56
16.	"Rabbit Run" (Eminem)	Mathers; Resto	Eminem; Resto^{[a]}	3:10
Total length:				68:10

The Shady/Aftermath Sampler
No.	Title	Writer(s)	Producer(s)	Length
1.	"Rap Name" (Obie Trice)	Obie Trice	Eminem	5:01
2.	"Stimulate" (Eminem)	Mathers	Eminem	5:03
3.	"'Till I Collapse" (remix) (50 Cent)	Curtis Jackson; Mathers; Nathaniel Hale; Luis Resto	Eminem	1:26
4.	"Gangsta" (Joe Beast)	Joe Beast	Mel-Man	3:35
5.	"The Weekend" (Brooklyn)	Nicole Louis-Jeune	DJ Khalil	3:05
6.	"California" (Shaunta)	Shaunta Montgomery	Mahogany Music	3:27
Total length:				89:47

20th anniversary edition
No.	Title	Writer(s)	Producer(s)	Length
1.	"Lose Yourself" (instrumental)			5:20
2.	"Love Me" (instrumental)			4:30
3.	"8 Mile" (instrumental)			5:57
4.	"Adrenaline Rush" (instrumental)			3:48
5.	"Places to Go" (instrumental)			4:15
6.	"Rap Game" (instrumental)			5:53
7.	"8 Miles and Runnin'" (instrumental)			4:08
8.	"Spit Shine" (instrumental)			3:39
9.	"Time of My Life" (instrumental)			4:21
10.	"U Wanna Be Me" (instrumental)			3:50
11.	"Wanksta" (instrumental)			3:38
12.	"R.A.K.I.M." (instrumental)			4:23
13.	"That's My Nigga fo' Real" (instrumental)			4:45
14.	"Battle" (instrumental)			2:56
15.	"Rabbit Run" (instrumental)			3:11
16.	"Lose Yourself" (Eminem; original demo version)	Marshall Mathers	Eminem; Jeffrey Bass; Luis Resto^{[a]}	3:01
Total length:				65:09

=== More Music from 8 Mile ===
No.	Title	Writer(s)	Producer(s)	Length
1.	"Shook Ones (Part II)" (Mobb Deep)	Johnson; Muchita	Mobb Deep	5:26
2.	"Juicy" (The Notorious B.I.G.)	Christopher Wallace; Hunter McIntosh; Sean Combs; Pete Rock; Jean-Claude Olivier; Samuel Barnes	Poke; Pete Rock	4:11
3.	"Gotta Get Mine" (MC Breed and 2Pac)	Eric Breed; Tupac Shakur	MC Breed; Warren G; Colin Wolfe	4:18
4.	"Feel Me Flow" (Naughty by Nature)	Anthony Criss; Vincent Brown; Kier Gist; Ziggy Modeliste; Art Neville; Cyril Neville; Leo Nocentelli; George Porter Jr.	Naughty by Nature	3:34
5.	"Player's Ball" (Outkast)	André Benjamin; Patrick Brown; Ray Murray; Antwan Patton; Rico Wade	Organized Noize	4:53
6.	"Get Money" (Junior M.A.F.I.A.)	Clark Kent; Kimberly Jones; Wallace	EZ Elpee	4:34
7.	"I'll Be There for You/You're All I Need to Get By" (Method Man and Mary J. Blige)	Nickolas Ashford; Robert Diggs; Valerie Simpson; Clifford Smith	RZA	3:45
8.	"Shimmy Shimmy Ya" (Ol' Dirty Bastard)	Diggs; Russell Jones	RZA	2:41
9.	"Bring the Pain" (Method Man)	Diggs; C. Smith; Carlton Ridenhour; Gary Rinaldo; Hank Shocklee	RZA	3:09
10.	"C.R.E.A.M." (Wu-Tang Clan)	Diggs; Jason Hunter; C. Smith; Corey Woods	RZA	4:12
11.	"Runnin'" (The Pharcyde)	Trevant Hardson; Emandu Wilcox; Derrick Stewart; James Yancey	Jay Dee	4:56
12.	"Survival of the Fittest" (Mobb Deep)	Johnson; Muchita	Mobb Deep	3:43
Total length:				1:57:32

Notes

- ^{^[a]} signifies an additional producer
- ^{^[b]} signifies a co-producer

== Other songs ==
- These songs did appear in the film but were not released on any soundtrack:
1. "Last Dayz" by Onyx
2. "Time's Up" by O.C.
3. "Unbelievable" by The Notorious B.I.G.
4. "Sweet Home Alabama" by Lynyrd Skynyrd
5. "Insane in the Brain" by Cypress Hill
6. "This Is How We Do It" by Montell Jordan
7. "Gang Stories" by South Central Cartel
8. "Who Shot Ya?" by The Notorious B.I.G.
9. "Temptations" by 2Pac
10. "Next Level (Nyte Time Mix)" by Showbiz and A.G.
11. "Player's Anthem" by Junior M.A.F.I.A.
12. "Da Mystery of Chessboxin'" by Wu-Tang Clan

== Charts ==
=== Weekly charts ===
Chart (2002–2003)	Peak position
Australian Albums (ARIA)	1
Australian Urban Albums (ARIA)	1
Austrian Albums (Ö3 Austria)	2
Belgian Albums (Ultratop Flanders)	6
Belgian Albums (Ultratop Wallonia)	6
Canadian Albums (Billboard)	1
Canadian R&B Albums (Nielsen SoundScan)	1
Danish Albums (Hitlisten)	1
Dutch Albums (Album Top 100)	2
European Albums (Billboard)	2
Finnish Albums (Suomen virallinen lista)	3
French Albums (SNEP)	6
German Albums (Offizielle Top 100)	1
Greek Albums (IFPI)	1
Hungarian Albums (MAHASZ)	1
Italian Albums (FIMI)	9
Japanese Albums (Oricon)	1
New Zealand Albums (RMNZ)	1
Norwegian Albums (VG-lista)	2
Polish Albums (ZPAV)	2
Portuguese Albums (AFP)	5
Singaporean Albums (RIAS)	2
Spanish Albums (PROMUSICAE)	3
Swedish Albums (Sverigetopplistan)	10
Swiss Albums (Schweizer Hitparade)	3
UK Compilation Albums (OCC)^{[A]}	1
US Billboard 200	1
US Top R&B/Hip-Hop Albums (Billboard)	1
US Soundtrack Albums (Billboard)	1

=== Year-end charts ===
Year-end chart performance for 8 Mile: Music from and Inspired by the Motion Picture
Chart (2002)	Position
Australian Albums (ARIA)	38
Canadian Albums (Nielsen SoundScan)	7
Canadian R&B Albums (Nielsen SoundScan)	2
Canadian Rap Albums (Nielsen SoundScan)	2
Canadian R&B Albums (Nielsen SoundScan) More Music from 8 Mile	48
Canadian Rap Albums (Nielsen SoundScan) More Music from 8 Mile	24
UK Compilation Albums (OCC)	13
US Billboard 200	33
US Top R&B/Hip-Hop Albums (Billboard)	28
US Soundtrack Albums (Billboard)	2
Worldwide Albums (IFPI)	9
Chart (2003)	Position
Australian Albums (ARIA)	7
Austrian Albums (Ö3 Austria)	27
Belgian Albums (Ultratop Flanders)	41
Belgian Albums (Ultratop Wallonia)	37
Dutch Albums (MegaCharts)	19
French Albums (SNEP)	50
German Albums (Offizielle Top 100)	22
Italian Compilations (FIMI)	7
New Zealand Albums (RMNZ)	17
Swedish Albums (Sverigetopplistan)	78
Swiss Albums (Schweizer Hitparade)	43
UK Compilation Albums (OCC)	9
US Billboard 200	7
US Top R&B/Hip-Hop Albums (Billboard)	13
US Soundtrack Albums (Billboard)	1
Worldwide Albums (IFPI)	38

=== Decade-end chart ===
Chart (2000–2009)	Position
Australian Albums (ARIA)	77

Notes:

- A In the UK, compilation albums were excluded from the main album chart from January 1989. 8 Mile: Music from and Inspired by the Motion Picture was classified as a compilation album for chart purposes and peaked at #1 on the compilations chart, not the main albums chart.

== Certifications and sales ==
Region	Certification	Certified units/sales
Australia (ARIA)	4× Platinum	280,000^{^}
Belgium (BRMA)	Gold	25,000^{*}
Canada (Music Canada)	5× Platinum	500,000^{^}
Denmark (IFPI Danmark)	Platinum	50,000^{^}
Finland (Musiikkituottajat)	Gold	21,281
France (SNEP)	Gold	100,000^{*}
Germany (BVMI)	Platinum	300,000^{‡}
Greece (IFPI Greece)	Platinum	20,000^{^}
Hungary (MAHASZ)	Gold	10,000^{^}
Italy	—	150,000
Japan (RIAJ)	3× Platinum	600,000^{^}
Netherlands (NVPI)	Gold	40,000^{^}
New Zealand (RMNZ)	4× Platinum	60,000^{^}
Norway	—	36,000
Portugal (AFP)	Gold	20,000^{^}
South Korea	—	66,035
Spain (Promusicae)	Platinum	100,000^{^}
Sweden (GLF)	Gold	30,000^{^}
Switzerland (IFPI Switzerland)	Platinum	40,000^{^}
United Kingdom (BPI)	2× Platinum	696,994
United States (RIAA)	6× Platinum	6,000,000^{‡}
Summaries
Europe (IFPI)	2× Platinum	2,000,000^{*}
Worldwide	—	11,000,000
^{*} Sales figures based on certification alone.^{^} Shipments figures based on certification alone.^{‡} Sales+streaming figures based on certification alone.
