= World Soundtrack Awards 2003 =

Belgian music awards ceremony

3rd World Soundtrack Awards

October 11, 2003

Best Original Soundtrack:
Frida

The 3rd World Soundtrack Awards were awarded on 12 October 2003 in Ghent, Belgium.

== Winners ==
- Soundtrack Composer of the Year:
  - Elliot Goldenthal - Frida
- Best Original Soundtrack of the Year:
  - Frida - Elliot Goldenthal
- Best Original Song Written for a Film:
  - "The Hands That Built America" - Gangs of New York
    - Composed by Adam Clayton, The Edge, Bono, Larry Mullen, Jr.
- Discovery of the Year:
  - Antonio Pinto - Cidade de Deus (City of God)
- Lifetime Achievement Award:
  - Maurice Jarre
