= Steve King (sound engineer) =

American musician and audio engineer

- Born: May 14, 1958; Northville, Michigan, US
- Died: June 3, 2014 (aged 56) Detroit, Michigan, US
- Genres: Hip hop; rock
- Occupations: Record producer; audio engineer
- Years active: 1980–2014
- Formerly of: Eminem

Steven King (May 14, 1958 – June 3, 2014) was an American record producer and audio engineer from Detroit, most known for his work at 54 Sound in Ferndale, Michigan with Shady/Aftermath artists. He won a Grammy Award for Best Rap Album at 45th Annual Grammy Awards for The Eminem Show.

== Death ==
Survived by his wife, Roberta, and his son Nick, as well a sister, Jennifer Orr, stepdaughter Kimberly Freiwald and stepson Christopher VanderBerg, he died at 56 on June 3, 2014, following a battle with liver disease.

== Awards and nominations ==
Year	Nominee / work	Award	Result	Ref.
2000	The Marshall Mathers LP	Grammy Award for Album of the Year	Nominated	
2002	"Without Me"	Grammy Award for Record of the Year	Nominated	
2002	The Eminem Show	Grammy Award for Album of the Year	Nominated	
2002	The Eminem Show	Grammy Award for Best Rap Album	Won	
2003	"Lose Yourself"	Grammy Award for Record of the Year	Nominated	
