= Jeff Bass =

American music producer

- Born: Jeffrey Bass; May 16, 1961 (age 64); Shaker Heights, Ohio, U.S.
- Origin: Detroit, Michigan, U.S.
- Genres: Hip hop; R&B
- Occupation: Record producer

Jeffrey Bass (/bæs/ BAS; born May 16, 1961) is an American record producer and musician from Detroit, Michigan. He is best known as one half of the Bass Brothers and for his work with Eminem. Bass is considered one of the most influential people in Eminem's career.

== Career ==
At age 16, Bass, along with four of his childhood friends, formed Detroit-based R&B group Dreamboy. In 1980, when Bass was 19 years old, Dreamboy was signed to Qwest Records, a record label created by Quincy Jones that same year. The group released their debut album in 1983 and a follow-up in 1984 before their contract expired and they were dropped from the label in 1985.

Bass would eventually go on to co-produce the song "Lose Yourself" alongside Eminem which won the Oscar for Best Original Song at the 75th Academy Awards. The song was featured in the film 8 Mile, which starred Eminem in his movie debut. Eminem and Bass previously shared a Grammy Award for 1999's Best Rap Album, The Slim Shady LP. Bass was also the speaker in "Public Service Announcement" and "Public Service Announcement 2000" (from The Slim Shady LP and The Marshall Mathers LP respectively), two tracks that serve as introductions to the albums they are featured in.

== Awards and nominations ==
Year	Award	Category	Work	Result	Ref.
2002	Academy Awards	Best Original Song	"Lose Yourself" (from 8 Mile)	Won	
2002	Critics' Choice Movie Awards	Best Song	"Lose Yourself" (from 8 Mile)	Won	
2002	Golden Globe Awards	Best Original Song	"Lose Yourself" (from 8 Mile)	Nominated	
1999	Grammy Awards	Best Rap Album	The Slim Shady LP	Won	
2000	Grammy Awards	Album of the Year	The Marshall Mathers LP	Nominated	
2002	Grammy Awards	Album of the Year	The Eminem Show	Nominated	
2002	Grammy Awards	Record of the Year	"Without Me"	Nominated	
2003	Grammy Awards	Song of the Year	"Lose Yourself"	Nominated	
2003	Grammy Awards	Best Rap Song	"Lose Yourself"	Won	
2003	Grammy Awards	Best Song Written for a Motion Picture, Television or Other Visual Media	"Lose Yourself"	Nominated	
2002	Online Film & Television Association Awards	Best Original Song	"Lose Yourself" (from 8 Mile)	Won	
2003	World Soundtrack Awards	Best Original Song Written Directly for a Film	"Lose Yourself" (from 8 Mile)	Nominated	
