= D12 discography =

- Studio albums: 3
- Singles: 6
- Music videos: 17
- Collaborations: 21

D12, an American hip-hop group, has released three studio albums and six singles. Their music has been released on record label Interscope Records, along with subsidiary Shady Records. D12 has earned three platinum certifications from the Recording Industry Association of America (RIAA). In this discography, music videos and collaborations are included as well.

D12's debut album Devil's Night was released in 2001. The album reached the number one spot on the Billboard 200 and reached the top spot on various charts internationally. The album received a platinum certification from the RIAA and sold almost two million copies in the United States.

In 2004, D12's second album, D12 World, debuted at number one on the Billboard 200, and received two platinum certifications in the United States from the RIAA. The lead single "My Band" became D12's first song to enter the top ten of the Billboard Hot 100.

== Albums ==
=== Studio albums ===
Title	Album details	Peak chart positions									Certifications
Title	Album details	US	AUS	BEL	CAN	GER	NZ	SWE	SWI	UK	Certifications
Devil's Night	Released: June 19, 2001; Label: Shady, Interscope; Format: CD, LP, cassette, digital download, streaming	1	4	5	1	5 (Note: The reported chart position is of the latter release Devil's Night (limited edition). The original album release peaked at number ninety-seven on the German Media Control Charts.)	4	9	7	2	RIAA: Platinum; ARIA: Platinum; MC: 3× Platinum (Note: For certifications of Devil's Night from the Canadian Recording Industry Association, enter D12 in the "artist name" field.); SNEP: Gold; BVMI: Gold; RIAJ: Platinum; RMNZ: Platinum (Note: To retrieve certifications from the Recording Industry Association of New Zealand, select the field "Top 40 Album Chart" along the following: "Chart #1284" for Devil's Night (Platinum); "Chart #1429" for D12 World (Platinum)); BPI: Platinum
D12 World	Released: April 27, 2004; Label: Shady, Interscope; Format: CD, LP, cassette, digital download, streaming	1	1	9	1	2	1	6	3	1	RIAA: 2× Platinum; ARIA: Platinum; BVMI: Gold; RIAJ: Platinum; RMNZ: Platinum; BPI: Platinum
D12 Forever Vol. 1	Released: June 19, 2026; Label: Brothers Keeper Ent.; Formats: CD, LP, cassette, digital download, streaming	—	—	—	—	—	—	—	—	—	—

== Extended plays ==
Title	EP details
The Underground E.P.	Released: 1997; Label: Self-released; Format: CD

== Mixtapes ==
Title	Mixtape details
Detroit, What! (Demo Tape)	Released: 2000; Label: Self-released; Format: CD
Mixtape (Limited Edition)	Released: 2003; Label: Self-released; Format: CD
Return of the Dozen	Released: 2008; Label: Self-released; Format: CD
Return of the Dozen Vol. 2	Released: 2011; Label: Self-released; Format: CD
The Devil's Night Mixtape	Released: 2015; Label: Self-released; Format: CD

== Singles ==
List of singles, with selected chart positions and certifications, showing year released and album name
Title	Year	Peak chart positions										Certifications	Album
Title	Year	US	US R&B	AUS	BEL	CAN	GER	NZ	SWE	SWI	UK	Certifications	Album
"Shit on You"	2000	—	69	77	17	4	8	32	25	21	10		Devil's Night
"Purple Pills"	2001	19	21	3	8	—	19	17	5	25	2	ARIA: Gold; BPI: Platinum; RMNZ: 2× Platinum	Devil's Night
"Fight Music"	2001	—	—	27	40	—	38	—	—	51	11	BPI: Silver; RMNZ: Gold	Devil's Night
"My Band"	2004	6	26	1	9	3	2	1	9	3	2	RIAA: Gold; ARIA: Platinum; BPI: Platinum; RMNZ: 2× Platinum	D12 World
"How Come"	2004	27	68	4	15	—	15	6	42	17	4	RIAA: Gold	D12 World
"Tear It Down" (featuring Xzibit and B-Real)	2026	—	—	—	—	—	—	—	—	—	—		D12 Forever Vol. 1
"—" denotes a recording that did not chart or was not released in that territory.

== Other certified songs ==
List of song, with selected certifications, showing year released and album name
Title	Year	Certifications	Album
"Under The Influence" (Eminem featuring D12)	2000	ARIA: Gold; RMNZ: Gold	The Marshall Mathers LP
"When the Music Stops" (Eminem featuring D12)	2002	ARIA: Gold; RMNZ: Gold	The Eminem Show
"One Shot 2 Shot" (Eminem featuring D12)	2004	ARIA: Gold	Encore
"American Psycho II" (featuring B-Real)	2004	RMNZ: Gold	D12 World

== Music videos ==
Year	Title	Director	Album
2000	"Shit on You"	Estevan Oriol	Devil's Night
2001	"Purple Pills"	Joseph Kahn	Devil's Night
2001	"Fight Music"	Marc Klasfeld	Devil's Night
2004	"My Band"	Phillip G. Atwell and Eminem	D12 World
2004	"How Come"	Davy Duhamel	D12 World
2004	"Git Up"	Davy Duhamel	D12 World
2004	"40 Oz."	Davy Duhamel	D12 World
2004	"U R the One"	Davy Duhamel	D12 World
2011	"Killzone"	James Martin	Return of the Dozen, Vol. 2
2011	"I Go Off"	Tom Vujcic	Return of the Dozen, Vol. 2
2011	"I Made It"	Christian Anthony	Return of the Dozen, Vol. 2
2011	"Outro"		Return of the Dozen, Vol. 2
2015	"Dirty Dozen"	@Jazpixels	The Devil's Night Mixtape
2015	"DJ Turn It Up"	El-JayBeats	The Devil's Night Mixtape
2016	"Steel Ill"	FrostisRad	The Devil's Night Mixtape
2016	"Raw as It Gets"		The Devil's Night Mixtape
2026	"Tear It Down"	Diego Cruz	D12 Forever Vol. 1
2026	"Nightmare Walking"	Diego Cruz	D12 Forever Vol. 1

== Guest appearances ==
Year	Song	Other performer(s)	Album
1996	"Dumpin'"	Dirtty Ratt, B-Flat	Payin' Dues
1997	"No One's Iller"	—N/a	Slim Shady EP
2000	"Get Back"	Tony Touch	The Piece Maker
2000	"Under the Influence"	—N/a	The Marshall Mathers LP
2000	"Quitter"	—N/a	Non-album song
2000	"Act a Fool"	DJ Butter	Kill the DJ
2000	"Words Are Weapons"	Funkmaster Flex	The Mix Tape, Vol. IV and Devil's Night (Special Edition)
2001	"These Drugs"	—N/a	Bones: Original Motion Picture Houndtrack and Devil's Night (Special Edition)
2001	"Dead Beat Dads"	5150 Mentally Insane	Damaging Words
2001	"Blow My Buzz"	—N/a	The Wash: The Original Motion Picture Soundtrack / Devil's Night
2001	"Don’t Try This at Home"	DJ Butter, Royce da 5'9", Billy Nix	SH#THAPPENS
2001	"911"	Gorillaz, Terry Hall	Bad Company: Music from the Motion Picture
2002	"She Devil"	Tech N9ne	Absolute Power
2002	"When the Music Stops"	—N/a	The Eminem Show
2002	"Rap Game"	50 Cent	8 Mile: Music from and Inspired by the Motion Picture
2002	"Serious (Remix) [Do You Really Want Beef]?"	Promatic	Promatic
2003	"Keep Talkin'"	DJ Green Lantern	The Invasion II: Conspiracy Theory / D12 World
2003	"Derty Harry (Remix)"	Proof	I Killed Spiderman: The Mixtape
2003	"Whether or Not (Freestyle)"	DJ Butter	Lyrical Smackdown
2003	"Outro"	Obie Trice	Cheers
2003	"Doe Rae Me (Hailie's Revenge)"	Eminem, Obie Trice	Straight from the Lab
2004	"Barbershop"	—N/a	Barbershop 2: Back in Business Soundtrack
2004	"Census Bureau"	DJ Kay Slay	The Streetsweeper, Vol. 2: The Pain from the Game
2004	"Let Me Spend This Money"	DJ Salam Wreck	DJ Salam Wreck Presents: Welcome to the Pyrex
2004	"Fuck Wit Us"	DJ Salam Wreck	DJ Salam Wreck Presents: Welcome to the Pyrex
2004	"B.N.U."	DJ Salam Wreck	DJ Salam Wreck Presents: Welcome to the Pyrex
2004	"Lies & Rumors"	—N/a	Shark Tale: Motion Picture Soundtrack
2004	"One Shot 2 Shot"	Eminem, Fatt Father	Encore
2005	"Throw It Up"	—N/a	Crime Life: Gang Wars soundtrack
2005	"My Ballz"	—N/a	The Longest Yard: The Soundtrack
2005	"Nuthin' at All"	Bizarre	Hannicap Circus
2005	"Pimplikeness"	Proof	Searching For Jerry Garcia
2005	"Off to Tijuana"	Hush	Bulletproof
2006	"Gurls Wit Da Boom (Remix)"	Proof	Hand2Hand: The Official Mixtape Instructional Manual
2010	"I Ain't Crazy"	Potluck, King Gordy	Greatest Hits with My Buds
2010	"Air Strike (Pop Killer)"	Canibus, DZK	Melatonin Magik
2010	"Desi Dance"	Hard Kaur	Party Loud All Year: P.L.A.Y
2011	"Beat Goes On"	Slaughterhouse, D.K	Non-album singles
2012	"I Told You So"	Nichol9	Non-album singles
2014	"MyArmy"	Swifty McVay	Swifty McVay Presents Poetic Poltergeist
2014	"Lay the Law Down"	Lazarus	Non-album single
2014	"Bane"	—N/a	Shady XV
2015	"Here 2 Party"	Swifty McVay	D12 Presents Swifty McVay LIVE EVIL where EVIL LIVE
2016	"Worlds Collide"	G-Mo Skee	My Filthy Spirit Bomb
2017	"Pimps & Hoes"	Swifty McVay	D-12 Presents Swifty McVay Grey Blood
2017	"I Will"	Bizarre	Tweek Sity 2
2019	"Killer's Blood"	Cryptik Soul	Killer's Blood
2022	"Panic Attack (Remix)"	Versatile	Non-album single
2025	"Big Bad Bullies"	Merkules	Survivor's Guilt
