= Ain't Nuttin' But Music =

2001 song performed by D12

Single by D12

from the album Devil's Night
- B-side: "Purple Pills"
- Released: October 2, 2001
- Studio: 54 Sound (Ferndale, Michigan); The Lodge (Indianapolis, Indiana)
- Genre: Comedy rap; posse cut
- Length: 5:11
- Label: Shady; Interscope
- Songwriters: Marshall Mathers; Denaun Porter; Von Carlisle; Ondre Moore; Rufus Johnson; DeShaun Holton; Andre Young; Scott Storch; Mike Elizondo
- Producer: Dr. Dre

D12 singles chronology
"Purple Pills" (2001)	"Ain't Nuttin' But Music" (2001)	"Fight Music" (2002)

Dr. Dre singles chronology
"Put It on Me" (2001)	"Purple Pills" (2001)	"Fast Lane" (2001)

"Ain't Nuttin' But Music" (sometimes called "Ain't Nothin' But Music") is a hip hop single by American rap group D12, taken as the sixth track from their debut studio album, Devil's Night. It achieved notable success in France and Belgium, peaking at #25 and #47 respectively. The single was only released in the two countries. The single was backed with the group's previous single, "Purple Pills", which was not released as a single in France or Belgium due to the outlandish content of its lyrics.

== Track listing ==
French CD single

No.	Title	Writer(s)	Producer(s)	Length
1.	"Ain't Nuttin' But Music"	Marshall Mathers; Denaun Porter; Von Carlisle; Ondre Moore; Rufus Johnson; DeShaun Holton; Andre Young; Scott Storch; Mike Elizondo	Dr. Dre	3:54
2.	"Purple Pills"	Mathers; Porter; Carlisle; Moore; Johnson; Holton; Jeffrey Bass	Eminem; Jeff Bass^{[a]}	5:05

French CD single

No.	Title	Writer(s)	Producer(s)	Length
1.	"Ain't Nuttin' But Music" (radio edit)	Marshall Mathers; Denaun Porter; Von Carlisle; Ondre Moore; Rufus Johnson; DeShaun Holton; Andre Young; Scott Storch; Mike Elizondo	Dr. Dre	5:24

US 12" Vinyl

Side A
No.	Title	Writer(s)	Producer(s)	Length
1.	"Ain't Nuttin' But Music" (single version)	Marshall Mathers; Denaun Porter; Von Carlisle; Ondre Moore; Rufus Johnson; DeShaun Holton; Andre Young; Scott Storch; Mike Elizondo	Dr. Dre	5:11
2.	"Ain't Nuttin' But Music" (instrumental)	Mathers; Porter; Carlisle; Moore; Johnson; Holton; Young; Storch; Elizondo	Dr. Dre	5:11

Side B
No.	Title	Writer(s)	Producer(s)	Length
1.	"Nasty Mind" (feat. Truth Hurts)	Marshall Mathers; Denaun Porter; Von Carlisle; Ondre Moore; Rufus Johnson; DeShaun Holton; Andre Young; Mike Elizondo	Dr. Dre	4:43
2.	"Nasty Mind" (feat. Truth Hurts) (instrumental)	Mathers; Porter; Carlisle; Moore; Johnson; Holton; Young; Elizondo	Dr. Dre	4:43

Notes

- ^{^[a]} signifies an additional producer.

== Charts ==
Chart (2001)	Peak position
Belgium (Ultratop 50 Flanders)	25
Belgium (Ultratop 50 Wallonia)	47
