= Proof discography =

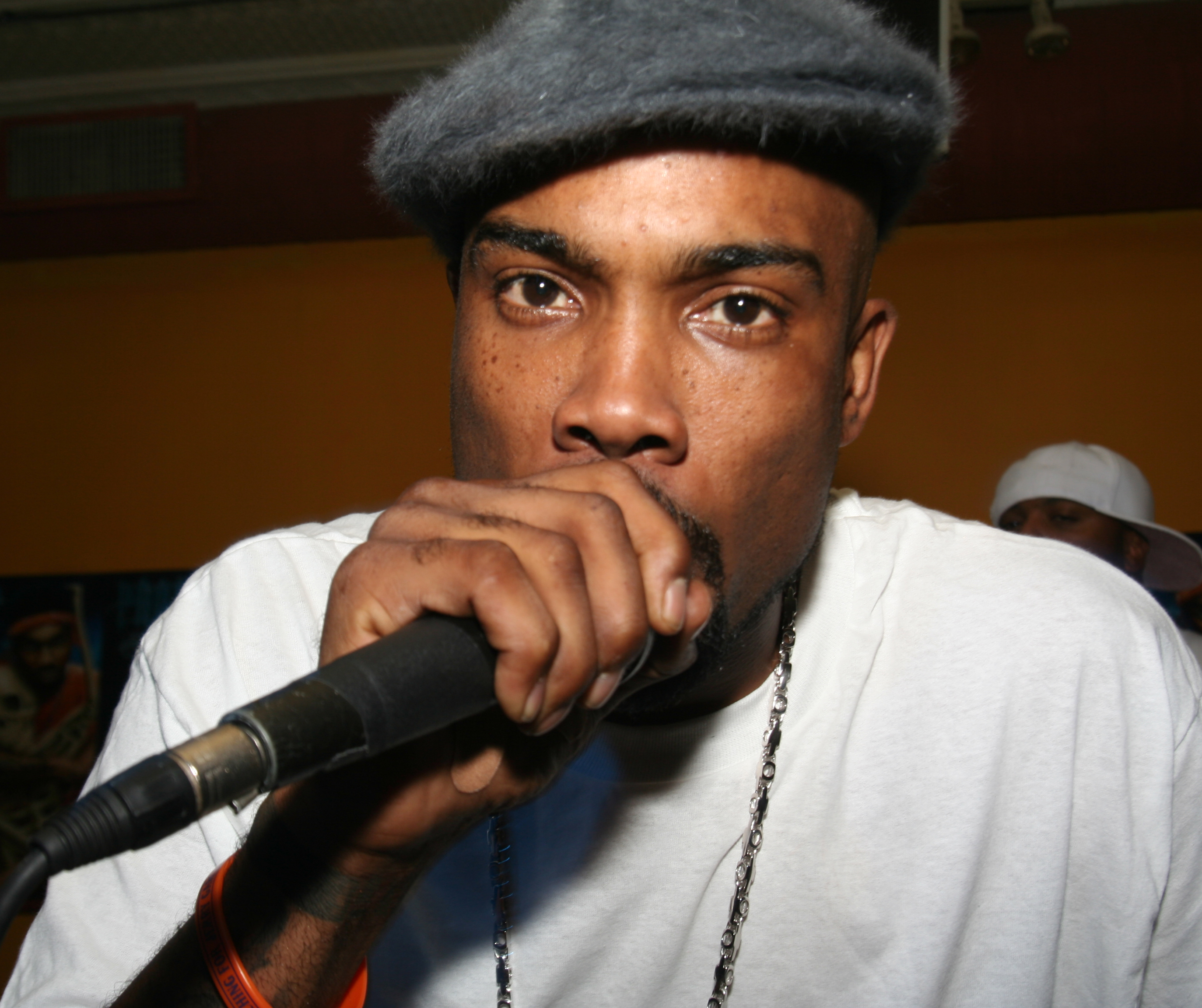
Proof performing in 2005

This is the discography of American rapper Proof. It includes solo work as well as collaborative work with other groups.

== Studio albums ==
List of studio albums, with selected chart positions
Title	Details	Peak chart positions
Title	Details	US
Searching for Jerry Garcia	Released: August 9, 2005; Label: Iron Fist; Format: CD, vinyl, digital download, streaming	65

== Extended plays ==
Title	Details
Electric Coolaid: Acid Testing	Released: December 10, 2002; Label: Iron Fist; Formats: CD, vinyl

== Mixtapes ==
Title	Details
23 Days of Hell (I Killed Spiderman)	Released: 2003; Label: Iron Fist
I Miss the Hip Hop Shop	Released: June 15, 2004; Label: Iron Fist; Format: CD, digital download, streaming
Make My Day (with DJ Butter)	Released: 2004; Label: Crazy Noise Productions
Luthaism (with DJ Exclusive)	Released: 2004; Label: Self-released
Grown Man Sh!t (with Salam Wreck)	Released: April 25, 2005; Label: Iron Fist
Hand 2 Hand: The Official Mixtape Instruction Manual	Released: March 7, 2006; Label: Iron Fist
2300 Milez Between Seattle & Detroit (with Livio as Liv N Proof)	Released: 2006; Label: Self-released
Mayor of Detroit	Released: October 3, 2008; Label: Bootleg
Time a Tell (with DJ Jewels Baby)	Released: August 1, 2010; Label: Iron Fist

== Singles ==
List of singles as a lead artist
Title	Year	Album
"Searchin'"	1995	Non-album single
"Anywhere"	1996	Anywhere EP
"One, Two"	2002	Electric Coolaid: Acid Testing
"Gurls Wit Da Boom"	2005	Searching for Jerry Garcia
"M.A.D." (featuring Rude Jude)	2005	Searching for Jerry Garcia

== Guest appearances ==
- 1990 Eminem & Proof - Vanilla Ice Vs. MC Hammer
- 1992 Bassmint Productions & Proof - Artificial Flavour
- 1995 Soul Intent - Fuckin' Backstabber
- 1995 Proof & Goon Sqwad - Good Lookin'
- 1996 Proof & Bombshell - Introduction
- 1996 Proof & Bombshell - What You Talkin' Bout? (Interlude)
- 1996 Proof & Bombshell - You Can't Hide
- 1996 Proof - Da Science
- 1996 Proof - Wuch U No
- 1996 Proof & Poe Whosaine - No Doubt
- 1996 Proof & Slum Village - 5 Ela (Remix)
- 1997 Eminem, Proof, Bugz & Almighty Dreadnaughtz - Desperados
- 1997 Eminem, Proof, B-Flat & Eye-Kyu - Dumpin'
- 1997 Proof - Something Going On
- 1997 Proof & T. Stuckey - Motor City Anthem
- 1999 Proof & DJ Carl - Interlude
- 1999 Eminem & Proof - Tim Westwood Freestyle (SSLP)
- 2000 Proof, Bizarre, Royce da 5'9" & Lab Animalz - Da 4 Horsemen
- 2002 Violence
- 2001 The Big Gays
- 2002 Yzarc
- 2002 Shootacha
- 2002 Hittman 4 Hire
- 2002 1x1 (with J-Hill & Obie Trice)
- 2002 We Ain't Leaving
- 2002 London Freestyle
- 2002 Time Flies (with Philpot)
- 2002 Stainless (with PMC & Money)
- 2004 Bounce Bounce (with Lola Damone)
- 2004 Unborn Soldier (with Obie Trice)
- 2004 Many Men (Remix)
- 2004 Ride Out
- 2004 E.S.H.A.M.
- 2004 Cali Trip
- 2004 Trife Niggas
- 2004 Whirlwind (with Kon Artis)
- 2004 Kool With Me (with Da Omen)
- 2004 We Comin' (with The Game)
- 2004 DJ Thoro Mixtape Song (with Eminem)
- 2005 No More to Say (with Trick-Trick & Eminem)
- 2006 Our Time (with Chino XL)
- 2006 Sick As They Come (with Liquid Silva)
- 2006 Lay U Flat (with B-Real)
- 2006 Trapped (with Eminem)
- 2007 How I Live (with Twiztid)
- 2008 Ups N Downs (with Ras Kass)
- 2008 2gether 4 Ever (with Trick-Trick, Esham & Kid Rock)
- 2026 The Manifesto (with Gorillaz & Trueno)

== 5 Elementz ==
5 Elementz was Proof's first group which consisted of three local Detroit rappers; himself, Thyme & Mudd. Also known as 5 Ela, the group worked with Proof a lot in his early career, featuring on three tracks on his 1996 vinyl single "Searchin'". Proof was heavily featured on their first three group projects before focusing more of his attention on D12. The group continued to release music after Proof's departure, their latest project "...Will Be Televised" was released in 2008. The group showed signs of a reunion before Proof's death in 2006. Mudd was featured on the track "Slum Elementz" from Proofs 2005 album Searching For Jerry Garcia and the group recently collaborated on the track "5 Ela Reunion" which was recorded for Time A Tell.

=== Guest appearances ===
Year	Song	Other performer(s)	Album
1996	"5 Ela" (Remix)	5 Elementz, Slum Village, Frank-N-Dank	Slum Village - Fan-Tas-Tic Volume 1
1998	"Don't Start None Won't Be None"	5 Elementz	T. Stuckey Presents The Motor City Compilation
1998	"Hip Hop Don't Stop"	5 Elementz, Moody, Hip Hop G's	T. Stuckey Presents The Motor City Compilation
1998	"Flava-TV Freestyle"	5 Elementz	Live Freestyle
1998	"Power Of The Underground"	Dogmatic, 5 Elementz, King Gordy, Obie Trice, Strike, Paradime, Supa Emcee, Shim-E-Bango, Madd Kapp, Lil Ruck, Dirt Diggla, Undertaka, Wes Chill, P. Groove	Sick Notes - The Virus
2005	"My Team"	5 Elementz, Philpot, Bizarre	5 Ela - Trademark Vinyl Single (Unreleased)
2008	"5 Ela" (Remix) (Demo Version)	5 Elementz, Slum Village, Frank-N-Dank	T3s (Of Slum Village) Website

=== Unreleased ===
Year	Song	Other performer(s)	Album
2006	"5 Ela Reunion"	5 Elementz	Time A Tell

== Promatic ==
=== Albums ===
Year	Album
2002	The Promatic LP
2003	Promatic Sampler
2010	So High

=== Misc. Tracks ===
Year	Song	Other performer(s)	Album
2001	"We Don't Like You"	Promatic	DJ Butter - Shit Happens
2002	"Process Of Elimination"	Promatic, Bizarre	DJ Butter - Dirty World
2002	"We Here"	Swifty McVay, Raw Collection, Promatic	Raw Collection - Private Circle
2002	Why Real *****s Gotta Die	Promatic	Promatic Promo LP
2002	"Waffle House"	Promatic, JUS	Promatic Promo LP
2002	"Tear This Bitch Up" (Original Version)	Promatic	Leaked
2002	"2 Way Jackin"	Promatic	Leaked
2002	"Serious" (Remix)	Promatic, Eminem, Swifty McVay	Proof - One, Two Vinyl Single
2002	"Bounce Bitch"	Promatic, Sick Notes	DJ Butter & DJ King David - Murder City
2003	"Back To Back"	Promatic, Obie Trice	Sick Notes - The Virus
2007	"Murdering You"	Promatic	Dogmatic - The Reality Show
2007	"Thug Shit"	Promatic, J-Hill	Dogmatic - The Reality Show
2008	"Grand Theft Auto"	Promatic, Kuniva	Dogmatic - The Face Off
2009	"We Don't Like You"	Promatic, Obie Trice	Dogmatic - Like Coleman Young

=== Unreleased ===
Song	Other performer(s)	Album
"So High"	Promatic, Guilty Simpson	Back Again
"Whuts Beef"	Promatic	-
"Why Do You Hate Me"	Promatic	-
"They Don't Care About Us"	Promatic, Madd Kapp	-
"The Kids"	Promatic	-
"Na Na"	Promatic	-
"Doe C Doe"	Promatic	-
"Come One Come All"	Promatic	-
"Grand Theft Auto (Original)"	Promatic, Kuniva	-
