= Paul Porter (musician) =

American musician

- Born: Paul Leroy Porter; August 20, 1962 (age 63)
- Origin: Detroit, Michigan
- Genres: gospel, black gospel
- Occupations: Singer, songwriter
- Instruments: vocals, singer-songwriter
- Years active: 1970s–present
- Labels: Light, Motown Gospel
- Formerly of: The Christianaires
- Website: facebook.com/OfficialPaulPorter

Paul Leroy Porter (born August 20, 1962) is an American gospel musician. Originally a member of The Christianaires, he started his solo music career, in 2008, with the release of, A New Day, that was released by Light Records. His second album, F.R.E.E., was released in 2014, with the backing of Motown Gospel releasing the project. These albums both charted on the Billboard Gospel Albums chart.

== Early life ==
Porter was born on August 20, 1962, as Paul Leroy Porter, to father Reverend Eddie Porter and mother, Ora Porter. He grew up in Detroit, Michigan, and started singing at the age of three on Easter Sunday. He is a cousin of rapper and producer, Denaun Porter, better known as Kon Artis of the rap group D12.

== Music career ==
He was a part of The Christianaires, who were founded in the late 1980s by him and his brother along with his cousins. He departed the group to start his solo career in 2008, with the release of A New Day on September 30, 2008, by Light Records. This album charted on the Billboard Gospel Albums chart at No. 21. Cross Rhythms' rated the album an eight out of ten. His subsequent album, F.R.E.E., was released by Motown Gospel on September 2, 2014. The album charted on the Gospel Albums chart at No. 33.

== Discography ==
List of studio albums, with selected chart positions
Title	Album details	Peak chart positions
Title	Album details	US Gos
A New Day	Released: September 20, 2008; Label: Light; CD, digital download	21
F.R.E.E.	Released: September 2, 2014; Label: Motown Gospel; CD, digital download	33
