= Fight Music =

Single by D12

from the album Devil's Night
- B-side: "Freestyle"; "Words Are Weapons"
- Released: November 27, 2001
- Recorded: 2001; Record One Studios, 54 Sound, and Vanguard
- Genre: Rap rock; hardcore hip hop
- Length: 4:21
- Label: Shady; Interscope
- Songwriters: Marshall Mathers; Denaun Porter; Von Carlisle; Ondre Moore; Rufus Johnson; DeShaun Holton; Andre Young; Mike Elizondo
- Producer: Dr. Dre

D12 singles chronology
"Ain't Nuttin' But Music" (2001)	"Fight Music" (2001)	"911" (2001)

Music video
- BET Video on YouTube
- Alternate video on YouTube

"Fight Music" is a hip hop single by the rap group D12 from their debut album Devil's Night. The song features various lyrics about violence and dangerous street fighting except in two verses: Bizarre's, which features various graphic subjects, namely oral sex with his grandmother, and Eminem's, which talks about the youth, how they feel and how they relate with this song and other songs. The song was produced by Dr. Dre.

According to Denaun Porter, Eminem considers this song his "best vocal performance ever, in his whole career. From the verse to the hook, he felt like that was his best."

In a list of the 40 greatest songs produced by Dr. Dre, Rolling Stone ranked “Fight Club” at number 37, calling D12 “truly underrated” and describing the track as a highlight of the group’s Devil’s Night debut. The magazine praised how “Dre’s bass rhythm and Mike Elizondo’s ringing guitar lines lend the performers a raw, emphatic sound,” while noting that the song resonated with listeners who were less receptive to some of the group’s more shock-oriented horrorcore material.

== Music video ==
The beginning of the video features Ice-T and different styles of music, a play on the beginning of the film The Warriors. The quotes, "can you count?" and "can you dig it?" are taken directly from the movie. The cut-scene where the radio DJ speaks is also a reference to The Warriors. The video features cameos by Fat Joe and Obie Trice. There are two versions of the video. One is the explicit version. The explicit version starts with Ice-T talking about the styles of music. However, the beginning where he says "Can you count, suckers?" has been cut. Also, instead of Eminem starting the chorus outside, he starts inside of what seems to be a city bus, with the rest of D12 seen in the background. The explicit version alters throughout the video. The clean version includes Ice-T yelling "Can you count, suckers?". The clean version also starts with Eminem starting the chorus outside with the rest of D12, instead of inside a bus. Some words have been changed or muted throughout the clean version's audio. Part of the video was shot in Coney Island, Brooklyn, and Melrose, Bronx.

== Track listing ==
The European CD single and Europe and Australia maxi-single are available with six different covers – one of each of the D12 band members.

UK CD single

No.	Title	Writer(s)	Producer(s)	Length
1.	"Fight Music"	Marshall Mathers; Denaun Porter; Von Carlisle; Ondre Moore; Rufus Johnson; DeShaun Holton; Andre Young; Mike Elizondo	Dr. Dre	4:58
2.	"Freestyle"	Mathers; Porter; Carlisle; Moore; Johnson; Holton		4:59
3.	"Words Are Weapons"	Mathers; Moore; Johnson; Kevin Bell	Eminem; DJ Head	5:04
4.	"Fight Music" (video) (director's cut)	Mathers; Porter; Carlisle; Moore; Johnson; Holton; Young; Elizondo	Dr. Dre	3:58
Total length:				18:59

European CD single

No.	Title	Writer(s)	Producer(s)	Length
1.	"Fight Music" (radio edit)	Marshall Mathers; Denaun Porter; Von Carlisle; Ondre Moore; Rufus Johnson; DeShaun Holton; Andre Young; Mike Elizondo	Dr. Dre	3:49
2.	"Fight Music"	Mathers; Porter; Carlisle; Moore; Johnson; Holton; Young; Elizondo	Dr. Dre	4:58
3.	"Fight Music" (music video)	Mathers; Porter; Carlisle; Moore; Johnson; Holton; Young; Elizondo	Dr. Dre	4:22
Total length:				13:09

Europe and Australia maxi-single

No.	Title	Writer(s)	Producer(s)	Length
1.	"Fight Music"	Marshall Mathers; Denaun Porter; Von Carlisle; Ondre Moore; Rufus Johnson; DeShaun Holton; Andre Young; Mike Elizondo	Dr. Dre	4:58
2.	"Fight Music" (acapella)	Mathers; Porter; Carlisle; Moore; Johnson; Holton; Young; Elizondo	Dr. Dre	4:01
3.	"Words Are Weapons"	Mathers; Moore; Johnson; Kevin Bell	Eminem; DJ Head	4:38
4.	"Fight Music" (instrumental)	Mathers; Porter; Carlisle; Moore; Johnson; Holton; Young; Elizondo	Dr. Dre	4:24
5.	"Fight Music" (music video)	Mathers; Porter; Carlisle; Moore; Johnson; Holton; Young; Elizondo	Dr. Dre	4:19
Total length:				22:20

US 12" vinyl

No.	Title	Writer(s)	Producer(s)	Length
1.	"Fight Music" (clean version)	Marshall Mathers; Denaun Porter; Von Carlisle; Ondre Moore; Rufus Johnson; DeShaun Holton; Andre Young; Mike Elizondo	Dr. Dre	3:49
2.	"Fight Music"	Mathers; Porter; Carlisle; Moore; Johnson; Holton; Young; Elizondo	Dr. Dre	4:58
3.	"Fight Music" (instrumental)	Mathers; Porter; Carlisle; Moore; Johnson; Holton; Young; Elizondo	Dr. Dre	4:24
4.	"Fight Music" (acapella)	Mathers; Porter; Carlisle; Moore; Johnson; Holton; Young; Elizondo	Dr. Dre	4:01
Total length:				17:12

UK 12" vinyl and cassette

No.	Title	Writer(s)	Producer(s)	Length
1.	"Fight Music"	Marshall Mathers; Denaun Porter; Von Carlisle; Ondre Moore; Rufus Johnson; DeShaun Holton; Andre Young; Mike Elizondo	Dr. Dre	4:58
2.	"Freestyle"	Mathers; Porter; Carlisle; Moore; Johnson; Holton		4:59
3.	"Words Are Weapons"	Mathers; Moore; Johnson; Kevin Bell	Eminem; DJ Head	5:04
Total length:				15:01

UK DVD-Video single

No.	Title	Writer(s)	Producer(s)	Length
1.	"Fight Music" (director's cut video)	Marshall Mathers; Denaun Porter; Von Carlisle; Ondre Moore; Rufus Johnson; DeShaun Holton; Andre Young; Mike Elizondo	Dr. Dre	5:03
2.	"Dirty Talk" (interview clips)			1:58
3.	"Shit on You"	Mathers; Porter; Carlisle; Moore; Johnson	DJ Head; Eminem^{[a]}	5:14
4.	"Words Are Weapons"	Mathers; Moore; Johnson; DJ Head	Eminem; DJ Head	4:37
Total length:				17:07

Notes

- ^{^[a]} signifies a co-producer.

== Charts ==
Chart (2001)	Peak position
Australia (ARIA)	27
Austria (Ö3 Austria Top 40)	61
Belgium (Ultratop 50 Flanders)	31
Belgium (Ultratop 50 Wallonia)	40
Germany (GfK)	38
Ireland (IRMA)	16
Netherlands (Dutch Top 40)	34
Switzerland (Schweizer Hitparade)	51
UK Hip Hop/R&B (Official Charts)	5
UK Singles (Official Charts)	11

== Certifications ==
Certification for "Fight Music"
Region	Certification	Certified units/sales
New Zealand (RMNZ)	Gold	15,000^{‡}
^{‡} Sales+streaming figures based on certification alone.
