= DJ Head =

American DJ

- Born: Kevin Bell; September 12, 1971 (age 54)
- Origin: Detroit, Michigan, U.S.
- Genres: Hip hop
- Occupations: Producer; DJ
- Years active: 1995–present
- Label: Shady Records

Kevin Bell (born September 12, 1971), known professionally as DJ Head, is a hip-hop producer and DJ from Detroit, Michigan. He is best known for producing and co-producing songs for Eminem, Xzibit, Jay-Z, D12, Valid, Obie Trice, Bizarre and as Eminem's original touring deejay from 1997 to 2002.

== Early life ==
Kevin Bell was raised in Detroit, attended Gesu Elementary School and is a graduate of Shrine Catholic High School in Royal Oak, Michigan (class of 1989), and is a Michigan State University alumni (Bachelor of Science, Engineering 1994). He also attended the Detroit Community Music School, studying Classical and Jazz Piano (1978–1989).

While working for a radio station, he and Proof released 3 versions of his W.E.G.O. mixtape series from 1993 to 1996.

== Television ==
His television appearances include Saturday Night Live (w/ Eminem), MTV Spring Break (w/ Eminem, Xzibit, Dr. Dre), Top of the Pops (w/ Eminem, Dido), Grammy Awards (w/ Eminem), EMA's (w/ Eminem), and multiple national and international tours. He appeared in the 8 Mile film, as the DJ for the rap battle scenes, inspired by the real life Saturday afternoon emcee battles at Maurice Malone's Hip Hop Shop in Detroit. In a recent round table discussion on Shade 45, DJ Head was credited by Eminem for introducing him to the music of 50 Cent, via a mixtape the DJ purchased by chance on the street in New York City. This led to 50 Cent later being signed to a multimillion-dollar recording contract with Shady, Aftermath, and Interscope Records.

== Production discography ==
Albums

- Eminem - Infinite (1996)
- Eminem - The Slim Shady LP (1999)
- Eminem - The Marshall Mathers LP (2000)
- D12 - Devil's Night (2001)
- Eminem - The Eminem Show (2002)

Extended plays

- D12 - The Underground E.P. (1997)
- Eminem - Slim Shady EP (1997)
- Bizarre - Attack of the Weirdos (1998)

Tracks

- Funkmaster Flex & Big Kap - The Tunnel (1999)
  - "Intro" (featuring Pain In Da Ass)
- Funkmaster Flex - 60 Minutes of Funk, Volume 4, The Mix Tape (2000) / Devil's Night (Deluxe Edition) (2001)
  - "Words Are Weapons"
- Xzibit - Restless (2000)
  - "Don't Approach Me" (featuring Eminem)
- Jay-Z - The Blueprint (2001) / Curtain Call (Deluxe Edition) (2005)
  - "Renegade" (featuring Eminem)
- Bones soundtrack (2001) / Devil's Night (Deluxe Edition) (2001)
  - "These Drugs" (D12)
