= Shit on You =

Single by D12

from the album Devil's Night
- B-side: "Under the Influence"; "I Remember (Dedication to Whitey Ford)"
- Released: December 5, 2000
- Recorded: 1999; 54 Sound and The Lodge
- Genre: Hardcore hip hop; gangsta rap
- Length: 5:29
- Label: Shady; Interscope
- Songwriters: Marshall Mathers; Denaun Porter; DeShaun Holton; Rufus Johnson; Von Carlisle; Ondre Moore; Kevin Bell
- Producers: Eminem; DJ Head (co.)

D12 singles chronology
"Shit on You" (2000)	"Purple Pills" (2001)

Music video
- Video on YouTube

"Shit on You" also known by the clean versions as either "Sh*t on You" or "S*** on You", is a song by American hip hop group D12. It was their commercial debut single, released on December 5, 2000. It achieved moderate success by reaching the top 10 of the UK Singles Chart. It was not included on the American vinyl, CD, digital, or streaming editions of their 2001 debut studio album Devil's Night, but was included as a bonus track on the cassette version, UK, European, and Australian releases, and on the deluxe version of Eminem's greatest hits album, Curtain Call: The Hits.

== Background ==
The song was mixed by Dr. Dre and features references to John Candy, JonBenét Ramsey, Richard Pryor, Steve Stoute, Richard Simmons, The Notorious B.I.G., "Vivrant Thing", the Rat Pack, Deebo and Peabo Bryson, whilst Eminem's line, "five more zany-actin' maniacs in action", hearkens back to his album debut, Infinite.

Proof, the only group member not to rap in the original song, recorded a remix, using a different beat, titled "Shoot At You", in 2002, which was available from his website. In some countries, "Shit on You" was also made available on the B-side of the group's following single, "Purple Pills". Detroit rapper and Eminem associate, Royce Da 5'9", who at the time was beefing with D12, made a song called "Shit on U", dissing Bizarre of D12 over the "Shit on You" beat.

== Music video ==
The video was shot on location in Detroit, the group performing in various locations around their home city, including Fox Theatre, Brewster-Douglass Housing Projects, the Joe Louis Memorial, Michigan Central Station, Comerica Park, and Runyon Avenue. The entire video is shot in black-and-white, apart from some cutaway sequences, including Bizarre as an abusive alcoholic living in a run-down house, Eminem as an angry old man, a cutscene where Eminem is at his old house and when Proof is with the chicks. Although Proof does not appear in the record, he provides a spoken introduction to the video, and appears alongside his fellow MCs.

== Track listing ==
European CD single and UK Cassette

No.	Title	Writer(s)	Producer(s)	Length
1.	"Shit on You" (single version)	Marshall Mathers; Denaun Porter; Von Carlisle; Ondre Moore; Rufus Johnson; DeShaun Holton; Kevin Bell	Eminem; DJ Head^{[a]}	5:30
2.	"Under the Influence"	Mathers; Porter; Carlisle; Moore; Johnson; Holton; Jeffrey Bass; Mark Bass	Bass Brothers; Eminem^{[a]}	5:14

UK and European Maxi single

No.	Title	Writer(s)	Producer(s)	Length
1.	"Shit on You" (single version)	Marshall Mathers; Denaun Porter; Von Carlisle; Ondre Moore; Rufus Johnson; DeShaun Holton; Kevin Bell	Eminem; DJ Head^{[a]}	5:30
2.	"Under the Influence"	Mathers; Porter; Carlisle; Moore; Johnson; Holton; Jeffrey Bass; Mark Bass	Bass Brothers; Eminem^{[a]}	5:14
3.	"Shit on You" (instrumental)	Mathers; Porter; Carlisle; Moore; Johnson; Holton; Bell	Eminem; DJ Head^{[a]}	5:19
4.	"Shit on You" (music video)	Mathers; Porter; Carlisle; Moore; Johnson; Holton; Bell	Eminem; DJ Head^{[a]}	5:26

American CD single

No.	Title	Writer(s)	Producer(s)	Length
1.	"Shit on You" (street mix)	Marshall Mathers; Denaun Porter; Von Carlisle; Ondre Moore; Rufus Johnson; DeShaun Holton; Kevin Bell	Eminem; DJ Head^{[a]}	5:30
2.	"Shit on You" (clean version)	Mathers; Porter; Carlisle; Moore; Johnson; Holton; Bell	Eminem; DJ Head^{[a]}	5:30
3.	"Shit on You" (acapella)	Mathers; Porter; Carlisle; Moore; Johnson; Holton; Bell	Eminem; DJ Head^{[a]}	5:26
4.	"Shit on You" (instrumental)	Mathers; Porter; Carlisle; Moore; Johnson; Holton; Bell	Eminem; DJ Head^{[a]}	5:19

UK 12" vinyl

No.	Title	Writer(s)	Producer(s)	Length
1.	"Shit on You"	Marshall Mathers; Denaun Porter; Von Carlisle; Ondre Moore; Rufus Johnson; DeShaun Holton; Kevin Bell	Eminem; DJ Head^{[a]}	5:30
2.	"Shit on You" (instrumental)	Mathers; Porter; Carlisle; Moore; Johnson; Holton; Bell	Eminem; DJ Head^{[a]}	5:19
3.	"Under the Influence"	Mathers; Porter; Carlisle; Moore; Johnson; Holton; Jeffrey Bass; Mark Bass	Bass Brothers; Eminem^{[a]}	5:14

American 12" vinyl

Side A
No.	Title	Writer(s)	Producer(s)	Length
1.	"Shit on You" (street version)	Marshall Mathers; Denaun Porter; Von Carlisle; Ondre Moore; Rufus Johnson; DeShaun Holton; Kevin Bell	Eminem; DJ Head^{[a]}	5:30
2.	"Shit on You" (clean version)	Mathers; Porter; Carlisle; Moore; Johnson; Holton; Bell	Eminem; DJ Head^{[a]}	5:30
3.	"Shit on You" (acapella)	Mathers; Porter; Carlisle; Moore; Johnson; Holton; Bell	Eminem; DJ Head^{[a]}	5:26

Side B
No.	Title	Writer(s)	Producer(s)	Length
1.	"I Remember (Dedication to Whitey Ford)" (street version) (performed by Eminem)	Marshall Mathers; Mark Bass; Jeffrey Bass	Eminem; Jeff Bass^{[b]}	5:43
2.	"Shit on You" (instrumental)	Mathers; Denaun Porter; Von Carlisle; Ondre Moore; Rufus Johnson; DeShaun Holton; Kevin Bell	Eminem; DJ Head^{[a]}	5:19
3.	"I Remember (Dedication to Whitey Ford)" (instrumental)	Mathers; M. Bass; J. Bass	Eminem; J. Bass^{[b]}	5:40

Notes

- ^{^[a]} signifies a co-producer.
- ^{^[b]} signifies an additional producer.

== Charts ==
=== Weekly charts ===
Weekly chart performance for "Shit on You"
Chart (2001)	Peak position
Australia (ARIA)	77
Austria (Ö3 Austria Top 40)	45
Belgium (Ultratop 50 Flanders)	17
Canada (Nielsen SoundScan)	4
Germany (GfK)	8
Ireland (IRMA)	12
Netherlands (Dutch Top 40)	11
Netherlands (Single Top 100)	8
New Zealand (Recorded Music NZ)	32
Sweden (Sverigetopplistan)	25
Switzerland (Schweizer Hitparade)	21
UK Singles (Official Charts)	10
US Hot R&B/Hip-Hop Songs (Billboard)	69
US Rap Songs (Billboard)	2

=== Year-end charts ===
Year-end chart performance for "Shit on You"
Chart (2001)	Position
Canada (Nielsen SoundScan)	18
Netherlands (Single Top 100)	100
UK Singles (OCC)	155

Chart (2002)	Position
Canada (Nielsen SoundScan)	131
