= Devil's Night (album) =

Studio album by D12
- Released: June 19, 2001
- Recorded: 1999–2001
- Studios: 54 Sound (Ferndale, Michigan); Record One (Los Angeles); Vanguard (Detroit)
- Genres: Hardcore hip hop; horrorcore
- Length: 75:21
- Labels: Shady; Interscope
- Producers: Eminem (exec.); Denaun Porter; DJ Head; Dr. Dre; Jeff Bass

D12 chronology
The Underground EP (1997)	Devil's Night (2001)	D12 World (2004)

Singles from Devil's Night
- 1. "Shit on You" Released: December 5, 2000; 2. "Purple Pills" Released: June 5, 2001; 3. "Ain't Nuttin' but Music" Released: October 2, 2001; 4. "Fight Music" Released: November 27, 2001

Devil's Night is the debut studio album by American hip-hop supergroup D12. It was released on June 19, 2001, by Shady Records and Interscope Records. It was also the first album to be released on Shady Records, although the label had been active since 1999. Production was primarily handled by Eminem and Dr. Dre, with contributions by Mr. Porter, DJ Head, and Jeff Bass. The album features guest appearances by Obie Trice, Truth Hurts, and Dina Rae.

Devil's Night received mixed reviews from critics but was a commercial success, debuting at number one on the US Billboard 200 with 372,000 album sales in its first week. The album was supported by three singles: "Purple Pills", "Ain't Nuttin' But Music", and "Fight Music".

== Background ==
The album was executive produced by Eminem, who had released his hugely successful third studio album, The Marshall Mathers LP, a year earlier. The album's title comes from the Devil's Night tradition, recognized in and around Detroit in which abandoned homes are set ablaze. This practice was so popular in Detroit that it was depicted in the film 8 Mile. The group recorded Devil's Night in memory of Bugz, who was killed in May 1999 just hours prior to a concert.

The song "Revelation" parodies "Another Brick in the Wall Part 2", where there are kids screaming and Eminem shouting "Wrong! Do it again!" and "If you don't eat yer meat, you can't have any pudding! You can't have any pudding if you don't eat yer meat!". During the chorus, Eminem also raps: "I don't wanna go to school, I don't need no education".

== Release and promotion ==
The album produced three singles: "Purple Pills", "Ain't Nuttin' But Music", and "Fight Music". The single "Shit on You" was also included as a bonus track on limited edition copies of the album. The album features two songs with disses aimed at Limp Bizkit, one a subtle reference in "Pistol Pistol" by Bizarre and another a hidden track by Eminem called "Girls", which is a diss track aimed at Limp Bizkit, DJ Lethal, Dilated Peoples, and Everlast. The album's cover depicts a matchbook on fire with the groups "D12" logo superimposed on it.

In August 2001, while on promotion for the album, D12 and Esham were kicked off the Warped Tour after members of the group allegedly physically attacked Esham over the lyrics of his song "Chemical Imbalance", which contained a reference to Eminem's daughter. Eminem was not present during the tour.

=== Censored material ===
A censored version of the album was mastered and pressed but for unknown reasons ended up not being officially released. Some copies however did get out into the general circulation though they are considered very rare and hard to find. On it alternate versions of "Purple Pills" and "Fight Music" were included, entitled "Purple Hills" and "Flight Music". "Shit Can Happen", "Pistol Pistol", and "Pimp Like Me", were also edited, removing the offensive content from their titles. The "Dirty Edition" was available in both Europe and the United Kingdom. However, some versions swap the running order, making "Shit on You" track three and "These Drugs" track one. The rare censored version of the album did not remove all expletives, as words like "ass", "asshole", "faggot", "nigga", "pussy", "hoe", "whore", "slut", "tits", "nuts" and "goddamn" were permissible on the album, as well as most sex references. "Fuck”, “bitch” “cunt”, “shit” as well as most violence and heavy drug use are removed on the edited version. The physical copies of the clean version mistakenly list "Girls" as the 18th track after "Revelation", even though "Girls" was not supposed to be listed on the back cover at all.

== Commercial performance ==
The album debuted at number one on the Billboard 200, with approximately 371,881 copies sold during the first week of release. It re-entered the number one spot in its third week of release with approximately 173,956 copies sold, overtaking Alicia Keys' Songs in A Minor by just 306 copies. Ultimately, the album was certified platinum by a two-week stay at number one and twenty-two weeks on the chart overall.

The album debuted at number two on the UK Albums Chart, with approximately 57,967 copies sold during the first week of release. Ultimately, the album was certified platinum; total sales of the album stand at 436,977 as of December 2017.

== Critical reception ==
Professional ratings
Aggregate scores
Source	Rating
Metacritic	58/100
Review scores
Source	Rating
AllMusic	4/5 stars
Christgau's Consumer Guide	C
Dotmusic	4/10
Entertainment Weekly	C
HipHopDX	4/5 stars
NME	7/10
Q	3/5 stars
RapReviews	7.5/10
Rolling Stone	3/5 stars
The Source	3.5/5 stars

Devil's Night was met with mixed reviews from music critics. At Metacritic, which assigns a normalized rating out of 100 to reviews from professional publications, the album received an average score of 58 based on 11 reviews, indicating "mixed or average reviews".

Nathan Brackett of Rolling Stone wrote: "If the Slim Shady and Marshall Mathers albums were slapstick trips into one man's psychosis - like the Marx Brothers starring in Taxi Driver - then Devil's Night is Friday the 13th by the Farrelly brothers [...] with results varying from silly to just dumb". The reviewer, however, felt that the album's redeeming qualities lied in the album's production and Eminem's lyricism, describing the album's high points as "some of the most accomplished hip-hop we'll hear this year". Jason Birchmeier of AllMusic highlighted "remarkable production" and Eminem's "songwriting genius on several of the song's hooks", who "bring[s] a catchy pop-rap approach to hardcore lyrics." Q Magazine described Devil's Night as "a slightly tweaked re-run of The Marshall Mathers LP, with a couple of stonking singles." NME's Ted Kessler called the album "Eminem's most misogynistic, homophobic, violent and anally fixated trip to date". "Like all his work it's offensive, defensive and, somehow, still quite charming", he added. Shaheem Reid, in his review for The Source, found some of the lyrics to be funny, but thought the themes used throughout the album get repetitive. Despite that, he commended the group's "wild word play".

Despite mixed reviews, the album gained a strong following after its release. Denaun Porter stated in a 2020 interview that he is really pleased with the project: "That album, man, when I think about it, there wasn’t a lot of skippers on that album. It was really well put together." On June 18, 2021, in celebration of the album's 20th anniversary, an "Expanded Edition" was released, which contains all three songs from the album's Limited Edition bonus disc along with a new track, "Freestyle", four new instrumentals, and an acapella version of "Shit On You".

== Awards and nominations ==
Year	Ceremony	Award	Result
2002	ECHO Awards	Best Hip-Hop/Urban Artist (International)	Won

== Track listing ==
No.	Title	Writer(s)	Producer(s)	Length
1.	"Another Public Service Announcement" (intro)			0:49
2.	"Shit Can Happen"	Marshall Mathers; Denaun Porter; Von Carlisle; Ondre Moore; Jeffrey Bass	Denaun Porter	4:52
3.	"Pistol Pistol"	Mathers; Porter; Carlisle; Moore; Rufus Johnson; DeShaun Holton	Eminem; Porter^{[a]}	5:22
4.	"Bizarre" (skit)			1:12
5.	"Nasty Mind" (featuring Truth Hurts)	Mathers; Porter; Carlisle; Moore; Johnson; Andre Young; Mike Elizondo	Dr. Dre	4:43
6.	"Ain't Nuttin' But Music"	Mathers; Porter; Carlisle; Moore; Johnson; Holton; Young; Elizondo; Scott Storch	Dr. Dre	5:12
7.	"American Psycho"	Mathers; Porter; Johnson; Bass	Eminem; Jeff Bass^{[a]}	4:37
8.	"That's How" (skit)			0:37
9.	"That's How..."	Mathers; Porter; Carlisle; Moore; Johnson; Holton; Bass	Porter; Eminem^{[b]}	4:49
10.	"Purple Pills"	Mathers; Porter; Carlisle; Moore; Johnson; Holton; Bass	Eminem; Bass^{[a]}	5:05
11.	"Fight Music"	Mathers; Porter; Carlisle; Moore; Johnson; Holton; Young; Elizondo	Dr. Dre	4:21
12.	"Instigator"	Mathers; Porter; Carlisle; Moore; Holton; Bass	Eminem; Bass^{[b]}	4:57
13.	"Pimp Like Me" (featuring Dina Rae)	Mathers; Porter; Carlisle; Moore; Johnson; Holton; Bass	Eminem; Bass^{[a]}	5:57
14.	"Blow My Buzz"	Mathers; Porter; Carlisle; Moore; Johnson; Holton; Bass	Eminem; Bass^{[b]}	5:10
15.	"Obie Trice" (skit)			1:06
16.	"Devil's Night"	Mathers; Porter; Carlisle; Moore; Johnson; Bass	Eminem; Bass^{[b]}	4:19
17.	"Steve Berman" (skit)			0:50
18.	"Revelation"	Mathers; Porter; Carlisle; Moore; Johnson; Holton; Young; Elizondo; Storch	Dr. Dre	5:48
19.	"Girls" (hidden track)	Mathers; Luis Resto	Eminem	5:35
Total length:				75:21

Limited Edition bonus disc
No.	Title	Writer(s)	Producer(s)	Length
1.	"Shit on You" (album version)	Marshall Mathers; Denaun Porter; Von Carlisle; Ondre Moore; Rufus Johnson	DJ Head; Eminem^{[b]}	5:30
2.	"Words Are Weapons"	Mathers; Moore; Johnson; Kevin Bell	Eminem; DJ Head	4:34
3.	"These Drugs" (explicit)	Mathers; Moore; Johnson; DeShaun Holton; Jeffrey Bass; Bell	Eminem; Jeff Bass; DJ Head	4:41
4.	"Shit on You" (music video) (explicit)	Mathers; Moore; Johnson; Holton; Bass; Bell	Eminem; Bass; DJ Head	5:26
5.	"Dirty TV International" (video)
6.	"D-12 Picture gallery"
7.	"www.D12online.com Weblink"
Total length:				95:32

2021 Expanded Edition bonus tracks
No.	Title	Writer(s)	Producer(s)	Length
20.	"Freestyle"	Mathers; Porter; Carlisle; Moore; Johnson; Holton	Porter	5:00
21.	"Words Are Weapons"	Mathers; Moore; Johnson; Kevin Bell	Eminem; DJ Head	4:34
22.	"These Drugs"	Mathers; Moore; Johnson; Holton; Bass; Bell	Eminem; Jeff Bass; DJ Head	4:41
23.	"Shit on You"	Mathers; Porter; Carlisle; Moore; Johnson	DJ Head; Eminem^{[b]}	5:30
24.	"Shit on You" (acapella)	Mathers; Porter; Carlisle; Moore; Johnson		5:20
25.	"Shit on You" (instrumental)		DJ Head; Eminem^{[b]}	5:28
26.	"Purple Pills" (instrumental)		Eminem; Bass^{[a]}	5:07
27.	"Fight Music" (instrumental)		Dr. Dre	4:22
28.	"Blow My Buzz" (instrumental)		Eminem; Bass^{[b]}	5:24
Total length:				120:47

Notes

- ^{^[a]} signifies an additional producer.
- ^{^[b]} signifies a co-producer.
- "Shit On You" contains an interpolation of "Make 'Em Say Uhh" by Master P.
- "Shit On You" was the commercial debut single of the group, being released in December 2000. It can also be found on the cassette version of the album as a bonus track.
- "Words Are Weapons" originally appeared on DJ Funkmaster Flex's mixtape The Mix Tape, Vol. IV.
- "These Drugs" originally appeared on the soundtrack of the 2001 horror film Bones.

Sample credits

- "Shit Can Happen" contains a sample of "Just Another Case" as performed by Cru.
- "Pistol Pistol" contains a sample of "Kick in the Door" as performed by The Notorious B.I.G.
- "Nasty Mind" contains a sample of "Ain't No Fun (If the Homies Can't Have None)" as performed by Snoop Dogg featuring Nate Dogg, Kurupt and Warren G.
- "Ain't Nuttin' but Music" contains a sample of "Turn Off the Radio" as performed by Ice Cube.
- "That's How..." contains a sample of "(Don't Worry) If There's a Hell Below, We're All Going to Go" as performed by Curtis Mayfield.
- "Fight Music" contains a sample of "Kashmir" as performed by Led Zeppelin and resung elements from Fuck Battlin’ by Bugz.
- "Instigator" contains a sample of "Under the Influence" as performed by Eminem f/ D12.
- "Pimp Like Me" contains a sample of Ain't No Fun (If the Homies Can't Have None) by Snoop Dogg, Nate Dogg, Kurupt and Warren G
- "Steve Berman" contains a sample of "The Way I Am" as performed by Eminem.
- "Revelation" contains a sample of "Another Brick in the Wall (Part II)" and "In the Flesh" as performed by Pink Floyd.
- "Girls" contains a sample of "Rollin'" as performed by Limp Bizkit.
- "Shit On You" contains samples of "In the Beginning" as performed by Lonnie Smith and "Vivrant Thing" as performed by Q-Tip.

== Personnel ==
- Jeff Bass – bass and keyboards on tracks 2, 3, 7, 9, 10, 12, 13, 14, 16 and 22; bass on track 19; guitars on tracks 3, 7, 9, 13, 14, 16 and 22
- DJ Head – drum programming on tracks 3, 7, 10, 13, 16 and 19
- Mike Elizondo – guitars on tracks 5, 6, 11 and 18; bass on tracks 5, 6 and 11; keyboards on tracks 5 and 11
- Scott Storch – keyboards on tracks 6, 11 and 18
- Camara Kambon – keyboards on track 5
- Ray Gale – harmonica on track 10
- Traci Nelson – backing vocals on track 11
- Dina Rae – vocals on track 13
- Luis Resto – keyboards on track 19

== Charts ==
=== Weekly charts ===
Chart (2001)	Peak position
Australian Albums (ARIA)	4
Australian Urban Albums (ARIA)	1
Austrian Albums (Ö3 Austria)	12
Belgian Albums (Ultratop Flanders)	5
Belgian Albums (Ultratop Wallonia)	10
Canadian Albums (Billboard)	1
Canadian R&B Albums (Nielsen SoundScan)	1
Danish Albums (Hitlisten)	5
Dutch Albums (Album Top 100)	5
Finnish Albums (Suomen virallinen lista)	2
French Albums (SNEP)	16
German Albums (Offizielle Top 100)	5
Hungarian Albums (MAHASZ)	26
Irish Albums (IRMA)	4
Italian Albums (FIMI)	39
New Zealand Albums (RMNZ)	4
Norwegian Albums (VG-lista)	5
Scottish Albums (Official Charts)	2
Swedish Albums (Sverigetopplistan)	9
Swiss Albums (Schweizer Hitparade)	7
UK Albums (Official Charts)	2
UK R&B Albums (Official Charts)	1
US Billboard 200	1
US Top R&B/Hip-Hop Albums (Billboard)	1

=== Year-end charts ===
Year-end chart performance for Devil's Night
Chart (2001)	Position
Australian Albums (ARIA)	37
Belgian Albums (Ultratop Flanders)	38
Canadian Albums (Nielsen SoundScan)	13
Canadian R&B Albums (Nielsen SoundScan)	5
Canadian Rap Albums (Nielsen SoundScan)	2
Dutch Albums (Album Top 100)	61
French Albums (SNEP)	142
German Albums (Offizielle Top 100)	49
UK Albums (OCC)	53
US Billboard 200	39
US Top R&B/Hip-Hop Albums (Billboard)	26

Chart (2002)	Position
Canadian R&B Albums (Nielsen SoundScan)	104
Canadian Rap Albums (Nielsen SoundScan)	57

== Certifications ==
Region	Certification	Certified units/sales
Australia (ARIA)	Platinum	70,000^{^}
Canada (Music Canada)	3× Platinum	300,000^{^}
Denmark (IFPI Danmark)	Platinum	20,000^{‡}
France (SNEP)	Gold	100,000^{*}
Germany (BVMI)	Gold	150,000^{^}
Japan (RIAJ)	Platinum	200,000^{^}
New Zealand (RMNZ)	Platinum	15,000^{^}
United Kingdom (BPI)	Platinum	421,980
United States (RIAA)	2× Platinum	2,000,000^{^}
^{*} Sales figures based on certification alone.^{^} Shipments figures based on certification alone.^{‡} Sales+streaming figures based on certification alone.
