= Purple Pills =

2001 single by D12

Single by D12

from the album Devil's Night
- B-side: "Shit on You"; "That's How..."
- Released: June 5, 2001
- Studio: 54 Sound (Ferndale, Michigan); The Lodge (Indianapolis, Indiana)
- Genre: Comedy hip hop
- Length: 5:04 ("Purple Pills"); 4:19 ("Purple Hills")
- Label: Shady; Interscope
- Songwriters: Marshall Mathers; Denaun Porter; DeShaun Holton; Rufus Johnson; Von Carlisle; Ondre Moore; Jeff Bass
- Producer: Eminem

D12 singles chronology
"Shit on You" (2000)	"Purple Pills" (2001)	"Ain't Nuttin' But Music" (2001)

Music video
- "Purple Hills" on YouTube

"Purple Pills", also known as "Purple Hills" in the radio edit, is a song by American hip hop group D12, taken as the second cut from their debut studio album, Devil's Night. It achieved notable success, reaching number 19 on the Billboard Hot 100, number two in United Kingdom, Ireland, and Norway, and the top 10 in Australia, Finland, Flanders, the Netherlands, and Sweden.

== Background ==
The track features verses rapped by Eminem, Bizarre, Proof, Swifty and a joint verse between Kuniva and Kon Artis. The album version of the song contains many references to drug use, with "purple pills", "golden seals", and "Mushroom Mountain" being examples of recreational drug use. When it was announced that the group intended to release the track as a single, due to the drug and sex references, it was deemed inappropriate for play on many radio stations, and as such, a censored version of the song, "Purple Hills", was made.

"Purple Hills" removes most of the drug and sex references and replaces them with comical lyrics. Such changes include the line "I've been to mushroom mountain" altered to say "I've climbed the highest mountain"; and the line "I take a couple uppers, I down a couple downers" changed to "I've been so many places, I've seen so many faces." Most of Bizarre's verse is entirely changed, due to the strong amount of sexual and drug content in it. Music videos were made for both "Purple Pills" and "Purple Hills" respectively. The accompanying music videos were directed by Joseph Kahn.

== Release ==
In the United States and United Kingdom, radio play was limited to "Purple Hills", as "Purple Pills" was deemed not suitable for radio. However, a number of underground radio stations in the United States played "Purple Pills". Music channels were also restricted to playing the video for "Purple Hills". When physically released, two versions of the single were made available in the United Kingdom — one for "Purple Pills", with the "Purple Pills" audio track and music video, and one for "Purple Hills", with the "Purple Hills" audio track and music video. In Europe and Australia, one version of the single was available—this contained "Purple Pills" as an audio track but the music video for "Purple Hills". In America, one version of the single was available — this contained "Purple Hills" as an audio track with no enhanced section.

== Track listings ==
US CD single
No.	Title	Writer(s)	Producer(s)	Length
1.	"Purple Hills" (video version)	Marshall Mathers; Denaun Porter; Von Carlisle; Ondre Moore; Rufus Johnson; DeShaun Holton; Jeffrey Bass	Eminem; Jeff Bass^{[a]}	5:09
2.	"Purple Hills" (instrumental)	Mathers; Porter; Carlisle; Moore; Johnson; Holton; Bass	Eminem; Bass^{[a]}	5:09

UK CD1
No.	Title	Writer(s)	Producer(s)	Length
1.	"Purple Hills"	Mathers; Porter; Carlisle; Moore; Johnson; Holton; Bass	Eminem; Bass^{[a]}	5:03
2.	"Shit on You"	Mathers; Porter; Carlisle; Moore; Johnson; Kevin Bell	Eminem; DJ Head^{[b]}	5:27
3.	"That's How..."	Mathers; Porter; Carlisle; Moore; Johnson; Holton; Bass	Porter; Eminem^{[b]}	5:12
4.	"Purple Hills" (video)	Mathers; Porter; Carlisle; Moore; Johnson; Holton; Bass	Eminem; Bass^{[a]}

UK CD2
No.	Title	Writer(s)	Producer(s)	Length
1.	"Purple Pills"	Mathers; Porter; Carlisle; Moore; Johnson; Holton; Bass	Eminem; Bass^{[a]}	5:04
2.	"Shit on You"	Mathers; Porter; Carlisle; Moore; Johnson; Bell	Eminem; DJ Head^{[b]}	5:27
3.	"That's How..."	Mathers; Porter; Carlisle; Moore; Johnson; Holton; Bass	Porter; Eminem^{[b]}	4:48
4.	"Purple Pills" (Director's Cut video)	Mathers; Porter; Carlisle; Moore; Johnson; Holton; Bass	Eminem; Bass^{[a]}

UK cassette single
No.	Title	Writer(s)	Producer(s)	Length
1.	"Purple Pills"	Mathers; Porter; Carlisle; Moore; Johnson; Holton; Bass	Eminem; Bass^{[a]}	5:04
2.	"Shit on You"	Mathers; Porter; Carlisle; Moore; Johnson; Bell	Eminem; DJ Head^{[b]}	5:27

European CD single
No.	Title	Writer(s)	Producer(s)	Length
1.	"Purple Pills"	Mathers; Porter; Carlisle; Moore; Johnson; Holton; Bass	Eminem; Bass^{[a]}
2.	"That's How..."	Mathers; Porter; Carlisle; Moore; Johnson; Holton; Bass	Porter; Eminem^{[b]}

European maxi-CD single
No.	Title	Writer(s)	Producer(s)	Length
1.	"Purple Hills"	Mathers; Porter; Carlisle; Moore; Johnson; Holton; Bass	Eminem; Bass^{[a]}
2.	"Shit on You" (clean version)	Mathers; Porter; Carlisle; Moore; Johnson; Bell	Eminem; DJ Head^{[b]}
3.	"Purple Hills" (instrumental)	Mathers; Porter; Carlisle; Moore; Johnson; Holton; Bass	Porter; Eminem^{[b]}
4.	"Purple Hills" (video)	Mathers; Porter; Carlisle; Ondre Moore; Johnson; Holton; Bass	Eminem; Bass^{[a]}

Australian CD single
No.	Title	Writer(s)	Producer(s)	Length
1.	"Purple Pills"	Mathers; Porter; Carlisle; Moore; Johnson; Holton; Bass	Eminem; Bass^{[a]}	5:03
2.	"Shit on You"	Mathers; Porter; Carlisle; Moore; Johnson; Bell	Eminem; DJ Head^{[b]}	5:27
3.	"That's How..." (explicit)	Mathers; Porter; Carlisle; Moore; Johnson; Holton; Bass	Porter; Eminem^{[b]}	5:12
4.	"Purple Hills" (video)	Mathers; Porter; Carlisle; Moore; Johnson; Holton; Bass	Eminem; Bass^{[a]}

Notes

- ^{^[a]} signifies an additional producer.
- ^{^[b]} signifies a co-producer.

== Charts ==
=== Weekly charts ===
Chart (2001)	Peak position
Australia (ARIA)	3
Australian Urban (ARIA)	1
Austria (Ö3 Austria Top 40)	41
Belgium (Ultratop 50 Flanders)	8
Belgium (Ultratop 50 Wallonia)	22
Europe (Eurochart Hot 100)	7
Finland (Suomen virallinen lista)	10
Germany (GfK)	19
Ireland (IRMA)	2
Italy (FIMI)	30
Netherlands (Dutch Top 40)	10
Netherlands (Single Top 100)	8
New Zealand (Recorded Music NZ)	17
Norway (VG-lista)	2
Scottish Singles Sales (Official Charts)	3
Sweden (Sverigetopplistan)	5
Switzerland (Schweizer Hitparade)	25
UK Singles (Official Charts)	2
UK Dance (Official Charts)	5
UK Hip Hop/R&B (Official Charts)	1
US Billboard Hot 100	19
US Hot R&B/Hip-Hop Singles & Tracks (Billboard)	21
US Hot Rap Singles (Billboard)	1
US Mainstream Top 40 (Billboard)	40
US Rhythmic Top 40 (Billboard)	5
US Top 40 Tracks (Billboard)	32

=== Year-end charts ===
Chart (2001)	Position
Australia (ARIA)	48
Belgium (Ultratop 50 Flanders)	78
Ireland (IRMA)	22
Netherlands (Single Top 100)	96
Sweden (Hitlistan)	74
UK Singles (OCC)	36
US Hot Rap Singles (Billboard)	9
US Rhythmic Top 40 (Billboard)	41

== Certifications ==
Region	Certification	Certified units/sales
Australia (ARIA)	Gold	35,000^{^}
New Zealand (RMNZ)	2× Platinum	60,000^{‡}
United Kingdom (BPI)	Platinum	600,000^{‡}
^{^} Shipments figures based on certification alone.^{‡} Sales+streaming figures based on certification alone.

== Release history ==
Region	Date	Format(s)	Label(s)	Ref.
United States	June 5, 2001	12-inch vinyl	Shady; Interscope	
Australia	July 9, 2001	CD	Shady; Interscope	
United Kingdom	July 9, 2001	12-inch vinyl; CD	Shady; Interscope	
