= Hip Hop Shop =

Clothing store

The Hip Hop Shop was a clothing store opened in 1993 by fashion designer Maurice Malone that was more well known for its open mic contests than its clothing. It quickly evolved into one of the main destinations for rap competitions in the Detroit hip hop scene. The spot, located on 15736 W. Seven Mile Road, had open mic contests that were managed and hosted by rapper Proof on Saturdays from 4:00 - 6:00 P.M. Its rap battles inspired the similar scenes depicted in the movie 8 Mile, starring Eminem. There are videos recorded in 1996 by the shop of Eminem battling other rappers. The Hip Hop Shop closed down in 1997 when Malone and his partner Jerome Mongo decided to move to New York and focus on the clothing line. It has since reopened under new management. Talks about a Hip Hop Shop return had been in the air for spring 2015, at the forefront of the project is Derwynn Matthews (nephew of Maurice Malone) and entrepreneur Khalid (Kah) Cooper, but failed to come into fruition.
