= Bones (soundtrack) =

2001 film soundtrack album

Bones: Original Motion Picture Soundtrack

Soundtrack album by Snoop Dogg and various artists
- Released: October 9, 2001
- Recorded: 2001
- Genre: West Coast hip hop; gangsta rap; horrorcore; R&B
- Length: 72:20
- Label: Doggystyle; Priority
- Producer: Snoop Dogg (also exec.); Fredwreck; DJ Battlecat; DJ Head; DJ Muggs; Domingo; Earthtone III; Eminem; Francisco Rodriguez; Jeff Bass; Mel-Man; Soopafly; Warren G; William DeVaughn

Professional ratings
Review scores
Source	Rating
Allmusic	3/5 stars
NME	link

Bones: Original Motion Picture Houndtrack is the original soundtrack to Ernest Dickerson's 2001 horror film Bones. It was released on October 9, 2001, via Doggystyle Records and Priority Records. It peaked at #39 on the Billboard 200, #14 on the Top R&B/Hip-Hop Albums chart and #4 on the Top Soundtracks chart. The soundtrack mostly features Snoop Dogg songs, but also features tracks by Kurupt, Xzibit, Kokane, Tha Eastsidaz, D12, LaToiya Williams, Cypress Hill and more. "Dogg Named Snoop" was the only single released from the soundtrack.

== Track listing ==
No.	Title	Producer(s)	Length
1.	"Birth of Jimmy Bones" (performed by Snoop Dogg)	Snoop Dogg; Fredwreck	2:59
2.	"Legend of Jimmy Bones" (performed by Snoop Dogg, MC Ren & RBX)	Fredwreck	4:06
3.	"Lost Angels In the Sky" (performed by Lost Angels & Kokane)	Battlecat	3:14
4.	"Ballad of Jimmy Bones" (performed by LaToiya Williams)	Soopafly	3:59
5.	"Dogg Named Snoop" (performed by Snoop Dogg & Tray Deee)	Mel-Man	3:49
6.	"This Is My Life" (performed by Kedrick & CPO)	Battlecat	4:02
7.	"It's Jimmy" (performed by Kurupt & Roscoe)	Fredwreck	4:38
8.	"Raise Up" (performed by Kokane)	Fredwreck	3:27
9.	"These Drugs" (performed by D12)	Eminem; Jeff Bass; DJ Head	4:39
10.	"Death of Snow White" (performed by Snoop Dogg, Bad Azz, Chan & Coniyac)	Francisco Rodriguez	3:42
11.	"If You Came Here to Party" (performed by Tha Eastsidaz & Kola)	Warren G	4:52
12.	"Fuck With Us" (performed by Kurupt, Tray Deee & Xzibit)	Fredwreck	4:54
13.	"Jimmy's Revenge" (performed by Snoop Dogg & Soopafly)	Fredwreck	5:01
14.	"Be Thankful" (performed by William DeVaughn)	William DeVaughn	3:27
15.	"F-It-Less" (performed by FT)	Domingo	4:29
16.	"Gangsta Wit It" (performed by Snoop Dogg, Nate Dogg & Butch Cassidy)	Battlecat	2:44
17.	"Memories" (performed by Cypress Hill)	DJ Muggs	2:19
18.	"Endo"	Fredwreck	2:17
19.	"Fresh and Clean (Remix)" (performed by Snoop Dogg & Outkast)	Earthtone III	3:59
Total length:			1:12:04

=== Bones Score ===
All music is composed by Elia Cmiral.

No.	Title	Length
1.	"Bones Opening"	1:23
2.	"Bones' Death"	2:54
3.	"Seance"	2:27
4.	"Revenge Lupovic"	1:57
5.	"Return to House"	2:43
6.	"Necropolis"	2:31
7.	"In Haunted House"	2:39
8.	"Revenge Shotgun"	1:58
9.	"Bones Rises"	2:19
10.	"Tia Feeds Dog"	1:06
11.	"Neighborhood Goes Bad"	1:13
12.	"In the Cellar"	1:32
13.	"Revenge Eddie Mac"	1:41
14.	"Finding Jimmy Bones"	2:48
15.	"Scarificed & Necropolis"	3:27
16.	"We Survived"	1:04

== Charts ==
=== Weekly charts ===
Chart	Peak position
French Albums (SNEP)	93
US Billboard 200	39
US Top R&B/Hip-Hop Albums (Billboard)	14
US Top Soundtracks (Billboard)	4

== Personnel ==
- Abdul Wahab – musette bagpipes (track 7)
- Alvin Nathaniel Joiner – performer (track 12)
- André Benjamin – performer (track 19)
- Andrew M. Shack – A&R (for Priority Records)
- Antwan André Patton – performer (track 19)
- Brian Knapp Gardner – mastering
- Calvin Cordozar Broadus Jr. – performer (tracks: 1–2, 5, 10–11, 13, 16, 19), producer (track 1), executive producer, A&R
- Chan Gaines – performer (track 10)
- Dan Osterman – trombone (track 13)
- Dave Aron – mixing (tracks: 4–6, 8)
- David Brown – performer (track 7)
- David Sheats – producer (track 19)
- DeShaun Dupree Holton – performer (track 9)
- Domingo Padilla – producer (track 15)
- Eddie Kedricks – performer (track 6)
- Eric Dwayne Collins – performer (track 2)
- Farid Karam Nassar – guitar (track 2), keyboards (tracks: 2, 8, 12–13), flute (track 7), percussion (tracks: 7, 13), moog synthesizer (tracks: 8, 12), scratches (track 13), mixing (tracks: 7–8, 12), producer (tracks: 1–2, 7–8, 12–13, 18), A&R
- Francisco Rodriguez – producer (track 10)
- Jamarr Antonio Stamps – performer (track 10)
- Jeff Bass – producer (track 9)
- Jerry B. Long Jr. – performer (tracks: 3, 8)
- John Frye – recording (track 19)
- Kareem Denis – mixing (track 15)
- Keiwan Deshawn Spillman – performer (track 11)
- Kevin Bell – producer (track 9)
- Kevin Gilliam – producer (tracks: 3, 6, 16)
- Kim Proby – performer (track 10)
- Kola Marion – performer (track 11)
- LaToiya Renée Williams – performer (track 4)
- Lawrence Muggerud – producer, arranger & mixing (track 17)
- Lorenzo Jerald Patterson – performer (track 2)
- Lost Angels – performers (track 3)
- Louis Freese – performer (track 17)
- Maggie Magarian – art direction & design
- Marshall Mathers – performer, producer & mixing (track 9)
- Melvin Bradford – producer (track 5)
- Mitch Rotter – A&R
- Nathaniel Dwayne Hale – performer (track 16)
- Ondre Moore – performer (track 9)
- Priest "Soopafly" Brooks – performer (track 13), producer (track 4)
- Rashaan "Cus" Stephens – mixing & recording (track 15)
- Ricardo Emmanuel Brown – performer (tracks: 7, 12)
- Rufus Johnson – performer (track 9)
- Sean Cruse – guitar & bass (track 12)
- Senen Reyes – performer (track 17)
- Steve King – mixing (track 9)
- The Velvet Orchestra – strings (tracks: 2, 7)
- Tracey Brown – mixing (tracks: 2, 10–11, 16)
- Tracy Lamar Davis – performer (tracks: 5, 11, 12)
- Troy Hightower – mixing (track 19)
- Vince Edwards – performer (track 6)
- Warren Griffin III – producer (track 11)
- William DeVaughn – performer (track 14)
- Winston "F.T." Morris – performer (track 15)
