= My Band =

2004 single by D12

Single by D12

from the album D12 World
- B-side: "B.N.U."
- Released: March 2004
- Length: 4:59 (album version); 4:44 (radio edit)
- Label: Shady; Interscope
- Songwriters: Marshall Mathers; Denaun Porter; Von Carlisle; Ondre Moore; Rufus Johnson; DeShaun Holton; Luis Resto; Steve King
- Producers: Eminem; Luis Resto (add.)

D12 singles chronology
"911" (2001)	"My Band" (2004)	"How Come" (2004)

Music video
- "My Band" on YouTube

"My Band" is a song by American hip hop group D12. It was released in March 2004 as the first single from their second album, D12 World (2004). The song is a comedic fiction of Eminem as the lead singer of the "band" D12. The single became one of the group's most successful, reaching number two in the United Kingdom, number six in the United States, and number one in Australia, New Zealand, and Norway. "My Band" was the first song to top the revamped singles chart introduced in New Zealand in April 2004.

== Content ==
The brief introduction of "My Band" summarizes the song's satirical message: that Eminem is the lead "singer" of the "band", which makes everyone else in D12 jealous and disrespected. In the chorus, Eminem describes how girls have confidence in the group just because he is in it, even though they “don’t even know the name of [his] band”.

Eminem talks about his own popularity in the first verse and the conflict it creates within the group. He describes episodes such as female fans attempting to make sexual advances when meeting him offstage, and group member Kuniva trying to attack him with a knife when he claims that Jessica Alba is his "wife-to-be".

In the second verse, Swift wrestles the mic from Eminem and describes some of the negative consequences of propaganda-like media coverage on the rest of the D12's members, such as not recording with Pro Tools, being stuck driving a van while Eminem rides in a tour bus, getting their names mixed up ("I thought you were Kuniva"), and being provided a dressing room "smaller than a decimal". Kon Artis and Kuniva talk about this together in the third verse, with Eminem occasionally interjecting. The two find themselves unable to confront him.

Just like Swift, Proof complains about the propaganda in his solo part, implying that people who promote this perception know nothing about the group. To back up his point, fans yell out "Where's Obie and Dre?", referring to rappers Obie Trice and Dr. Dre. He also complains that Eminem gets "ninety and we only get ten percent" after explaining that they "ain't a band" because they "don't play instruments" in response to a fan exclaiming "I love your band!"

In the fifth verse, Bizarre, after attacking Eminem, who is at that time singing in the manner of a traditional boy band, attacks the media for focusing on Eminem when discussing and covering the group and claims that he is actually the most popular member of the group. He also threatens to leave D12 on several occasions, claiming he will "start a group with The Real Roxanne".

After this fifth verse, there is a short hook by Eminem (sung in boy band style with the other members singing backup vocals), and Bizarre follows by trying to sing the chorus, which results in laughter. After that, some members yell out random comments while the others sing the song's title repeatedly.

At the end of the song, Eminem sings in a parodic Spanish-style accent about how his salsa "makes all the pretty girls want to dance" and "take off their underpants", then facetiously promoting a fictional next single called "My Salsa" (a parody of Kelis' hit single "Milkshake"). The song then ends abruptly, followed by Eminem asking, "Where'd everybody go?".

== Parodies ==
My Band parodies several other songs in both the lyrics and its music video. Among these are the following:

- 50 Cent's "In da Club" video (Bizarre attempts to lose weight in the music video, similar to 50 Cent working out in the beginning of "In Da Club")
- Backstreet Boys' "I Want It That Way" video (the band is dressed in white in the music video and Eminem performs a typical boy band style vamp)
- Eminem's "Superman" and "Lose Yourself" videos (Bizarre claims he is in the back of these videos)
- Kelis' "Milkshake" (Eminem's "My Salsa")

== Music video ==
The music video begins by showing the rest of D12 looking through the window of a door to find Eminem receiving a massage, which is similar to the song's preceding skit on the album, "Dude". It then cuts to shots of Eminem in a limousine while the others are forced to wait for a bus, and the whole song's context is picked up from there.

Later scenes include Bizarre attempting to get in shape (parodying the video for 50 Cent's "In Da Club"), Bizarre and Verne Troyer spoofing fellow Michiganders Kid Rock and Joe C., Bizarre in the background of Eminem's "Lose Yourself" and "Superman" music videos, the entire band performing a boy band-style song while dressed like *NSYNC, and a re-enactment of Janet Jackson's "wardrobe malfunction" (with Bizarre as Janet and Eminem as Justin Timberlake).

At the 2004 MTV Video Music Awards, "My Band" (directed by Philip G. Atwell, co-directed by Eminem) was nominated for Video of the Year, Best Group Video, and Best Rap Video, but did not win in any of the categories. During their performance of the song at the 2004 MTV Movie Awards, Eminem mooned the audience. MTV originally planned to blur Eminem's bare bottom, but in light of their recent problems with the aforementioned "wardrobe malfunction" they instead decided to cut the mooning from the performance altogether. Pictures of Eminem's mooning have been spread across the internet.

In an uncensored version of the video, a topless woman appears next to Eminem and a topless woman dances on a pole.

On the YouTube upload, the song lists a feature named "Cameo".

== Track listings ==
UK CD1

No.	Title	Writer(s)	Producer(s)	Length
1.	"My Band"	Marshall Mathers; Denaun Porter; Von Carlisle; Ondre Moore; Rufus Johnson; DeShaun Holton; Luis Resto; Steve King	Eminem; Luis Resto^{[a]}	4:58
2.	"B. N. U."	Mathers; Porter; Carlisle; Moore; Johnson; Holton; Resto	Eminem; Resto^{[a]}	4:43

UK CD2

No.	Title	Writer(s)	Producer(s)	Length
1.	"My Band"	Marshall Mathers; Denaun Porter; Von Carlisle; Ondre Moore; Rufus Johnson; DeShaun Holton; Luis Resto; Steve King	Eminem; Luis Resto^{[a]}	4:58
2.	"B. N. U."	Mathers; Porter; Carlisle; Moore; Johnson; Holton; Resto	Eminem; Resto^{[a]}	4:43
3.	"My Band - Instrumental"	Mathers; Porter; Carlisle; Moore; Johnson; Holton; Resto; King	Eminem; Resto^{[a]}	4:58
4.	"My Band - Video"	Mathers; Porter; Carlisle; Moore; Johnson; Holton; Resto; King	Eminem; Resto^{[a]}	4:58

Notes

- ^{^[a]} signifies an additional producer.

== Charts ==
=== Weekly charts ===
Chart (2004)	Peak position
Australia (ARIA)	1
Australian Urban (ARIA)	1
Austria (Ö3 Austria Top 40)	4
Belgium (Ultratop 50 Flanders)	9
Belgium (Ultratop 50 Wallonia)	15
Canada (Nielsen SoundScan)	3
Canada CHR/Pop Top 30 (Radio & Records)	5
Croatia (HRT)	8
Denmark (Tracklisten)	3
Europe (Eurochart Hot 100)	3
Finland (Suomen virallinen lista)	16
France (SNEP)	23
Germany (GfK)	2
Hungary (Editors' Choice Top 40)	36
Ireland (IRMA)	2
Italy (FIMI)	12
Netherlands (Dutch Top 40)	2
Netherlands (Single Top 100)	2
New Zealand (Recorded Music NZ)	1
Norway (VG-lista)	1
Romania (Romanian Top 100)	10
Sweden (Sverigetopplistan)	9
Switzerland (Schweizer Hitparade)	3
UK Singles (Official Charts)	2
US Billboard Hot 100	6
US Hot R&B/Hip-Hop Singles & Tracks (Billboard)	26
US Hot Rap Tracks (Billboard)	7
US Mainstream Top 40 (Billboard)	3
US Rhythmic Top 40 (Billboard)	1

=== Year-end charts ===
Chart (2004)	Position
Australia (ARIA)	11
Australian Urban (ARIA)	4
Austria (Ö3 Austria Top 40)	38
Belgium (Ultratop 50 Flanders)	47
Belgium (Ultratop 50 Wallonia)	78
Brazil (Crowley)	46
Germany (Media Control GfK)	27
Ireland (IRMA)	14
Netherlands (Dutch Top 40)	38
Netherlands (Single Top 100)	26
New Zealand (RIANZ)	8
Sweden (Hitlistan)	64
Switzerland (Schweizer Hitparade)	24
UK Singles (OCC)	16
US Billboard Hot 100	59
US Mainstream Top 40 (Billboard)	32
US Rhythmic Top 40 (Billboard)	30

== Certifications ==
Region	Certification	Certified units/sales
Australia (ARIA)	Platinum	70,000^{^}
Germany (BVMI)	Gold	150,000^{‡}
New Zealand (RMNZ)	2× Platinum	60,000^{‡}
Norway (IFPI Norway)	Gold	5,000^{*}
United Kingdom (BPI)	Platinum	600,000^{‡}
United States (RIAA)	Gold	500,000^{*}
^{*} Sales figures based on certification alone.^{^} Shipments figures based on certification alone.^{‡} Sales+streaming figures based on certification alone.
