= The Mix Tape, Vol. IV =

60 Minutes of Funk, Volume IV: The Mixtape

Mixtape by Funkmaster Flex
- Released: December 5, 2000
- Recorded: 2000
- Genre: Hardcore hip hop
- Length: 74:13
- Label: Loud
- Producer: Funkmaster Flex (exec.); A Kid Called Roots; Big Sox; Chris Kellman; Cipha Sounds; Crooklyn Clan; DJ Envy; DJ Paul; DJ Twinz; DL; DR Period; Dre Santiago; Eminem; Irv Gotti; Jay E; Jermaine Dupri; Juicy J; KayGee; Mister Cee; Mono; Nobody; Nottz; Swift; Swizz Beatz; Zach White; Bryan-Michael Cox; DJ Head

Funkmaster Flex chronology
The Tunnel (1999)	60 Minutes of Funk, Volume IV: The Mixtape (2000)	Car Show Tour (2005)

Singles from 60 Minutes of Funk, Volume IV: The Mixtape
- 1. "Do You?" Released: October 31, 2000; 2. "Good Life" Released: 2000

Professional ratings
Review scores
Source	Rating
AllMusic	2/5 stars

60 Minutes of Funk, Volume IV: The Mixtape is a mixtape by American DJ Funkmaster Flex. It was released on December 5, 2000 via Loud Records, serving as a sequel to 1998 The Mix Tape Volume III: 60 Minutes of Funk (The Final Chapter) and the fourth installment in his 60 Minute of Funk mixtape series.

This project was a departure from Flex's previous Mix Tape releases, which consisted of freestyles mixed with previously released songs. This, however, was mostly made up of original songs with original production with Funkmaster Flex providing the DJ mix.

== Singles ==
Two singles made it to the Billboard charts, "Do You", which featured DMX, was the most successful of the two, reaching 92 on the Billboard Hot 100. Faith Evans's "Goodlife" became hit on both the R&B and rap charts.

== Commercial performance ==
60 Minutes of Funk, Volume IV: The Mixtape was a success, peaking at 26 on the Billboard 200 and becoming Funk Flex's fourth consecutive album to earn a gold certification from the Recording Industry Association of America. To date this remains the final entry in the 60 Minute of Funk mixtape series, a fifth installment was planned for release on January 15, 2002, however the album's release was cancelled.

== Track listing ==
No.	Title	Producer(s)	Length
1.	"Intro" (featuring Dr. Dre)	P. King	0:56
2.	"Do You" (featuring DMX)	DL; Irv Gotti	3:56
3.	"I Don't Care" (featuring Jadakiss)	Swizz Beatz	3:13
4.	"How Would You Like It" (featuring Ginuwine)	Nobody	3:53
5.	"Come Over" (featuring Nelly)	Jason "Jay E" Epperson	3:30
6.	"The Wickedest" (featuring DJ Mister Cee and Notorious B.I.G.)	Mister Cee	2:38
7.	"Born True" (Interlude)		0:35
8.	"Ante Up (Remix)" (featuring M.O.P., Busta Rhymes, Remy Ma and Teflon)	DR Period	3:34
9.	"Words Are Weapons" (featuring D12)	Eminem; DJ Head^{[a]}	4:07
10.	"The Needle" (featuring Nature)	DJ Twinz	2:23
11.	"Call Me Drag-On" (featuring Drag-On)	DJ Twinz	2:04
12.	"Thug Anthem 2000" (featuring Crooklyn Clan)	Crooklyn Clan	0:43
13.	"You Will Never Find" (featuring In Essence)	Cipha Sounds	1:56
14.	"Good Life" (featuring Faith Evans)	Kay Gee	3:49
15.	"Did She Say (So So Def Remix)" (featuring Jagged Edge, Jermaine Dupri, Da Brat and Lil' Bow Wow)	Jermaine Dupri; Bryan-Michael Cox^{[a]}	2:29
16.	"Rockin'" (featuring Lil' Kim)	Zach White	4:02
17.	"What Son What" (featuring Capone-N-Noreaga)	Chris Kellman; Swift	5:24
18.	"Feelin the Hate" (featuring the Murderers)	DJ Envy; Irv Gotti; Mono	4:10
19.	"Uhhnnh" (featuring The Bad Seed)	Nottz	1:26
20.	"Bad" (featuring Shyne)	Griff	1:54
21.	"Block Lockdown" (featuring Ludacris and I-20)	Dre Santiago	4:24
22.	"Break da Law 2001" (featuring Project Pat and Three 6 Mafia)	DJ Paul; Juicy J	3:05
23.	"Duck Down" (featuring Da Franchise)	Teflon	2:16
24.	"Fine Line" (featuring Saukrates)	Big Sox	2:43
25.	"Rush" (featuring Lady Luck)	A Kid Called Roots	4:05
26.	"Freestyle" (featuring DJ Clue? and Fabolous)	DJ Clue?; Doro	0:58
Total length:			74:13

Notes

- ^{^[a]} signifies a co-producer.

Sample credits

- Track 2 contains elements from "Jungle Boogie", written by Claydes Charles Smith, Dennis Thomas, Donald Boyce, George Melvin Brown, Richard Westfield, Robert Earl Bell, Robert Spike Mickens and Ronald Bell, and performed by Kool & the Gang
- Track 4 contains elements from "Sandino", written and performed by Jerry Goldsmith
- Track 6 contains elements from "I Didn't Mean To", written by John Owens, and performed by Casual
- Track 14 contains elements from "Seventh Heaven", written by Tami Lester Smith, and performed by Gwen Guthrie

== Charts ==
=== Weekly charts ===
Chart (2000)	Peak position
US Billboard 200	26
US Top R&B/Hip-Hop Albums (Billboard)	5
US Independent Albums (Billboard)	2

=== Year-end charts ===
Chart (2001)	Position
US Billboard 200	157
US Top R&B/Hip-Hop Albums (Billboard)	72

== Certifications ==
Region	Certification	Certified units/sales
United States (RIAA)	Gold	500,000^{^}
^{^} Shipments figures based on certification alone.
