= D12 World =

Studio album by D12
- Released: April 27, 2004
- Recorded: 2002–2004
- Studios: 54 Sound (Ferndale, Michigan); Teklab (Cincinnati); DNAB (Detroit); Can-Am (Tarzana, California)
- Genres: Hardcore hip hop; horrorcore
- Length: 77:49
- Labels: Shady; Interscope
- Producers: Dr. Dre; Eminem; Essman; Hi-Tek; Kanye West; Luis Resto; Mike Elizondo; Mr. Porter; Night & Day; Red Spyda; Trackboyz; Witt & Pep

D12 chronology
Devil's Night (2001)	D12 World (2004)	D12 Forever Vol. 1 (2026)

Singles from D12 World
- 1. "My Band" Released: March 2004; 2. "How Come" Released: June 8, 2004

D12 World is the second studio album by the American hip-hop group D12, released on April 27, 2004. The album sold 544,000 copies in its first week on the US Billboard 200. The album is also the last D12 release to feature Proof before he died in 2006, and the final D12 album to feature Eminem as a D12 member before his departure in 2018.

== Background ==
In memory of Bugz, who was killed before a concert on May 21, 1999, the group recorded the track "Good Die Young" in his memory. The album also includes a skit entitled "Bugz '97", which is a 1997 recording of Bugz, originally taken from the song "Desperados". The group was often overshadowed by Eminem's massive success, and as such, the group toured without him for promotion of the album (but the album still reached the top of the US Billboard chart). At the time, Eminem was busy recording Encore. Although shadowed by Eminem's success, members Bizarre and Proof managed to prevail with mildly successful solo careers following D12 World, with the releases of Hannicap Circus and Searching for Jerry Garcia, respectively, in 2005. Before the album's release, "6 in the Morning" was featured on Eminem's 2003 mixtape Straight from the Lab and was entitled "Come On In". Group member Kuniva stated in a podcast that most of Denaun's verses were recorded in his home studio as opposed to with the rest of the group, due to frequent arguments with Proof.

== Production ==
The album was executively produced by Eminem, who also handled most of the audio production for the album along with Denaun Porter, Dr. Dre, Essman, Hi-Tek, Kanye West, Luis Resto, Mike Elizondo, Night & Day, Red Spyda, Trackboyz and Witt & Pep. Guest appearances on the album included Obie Trice, Deanna Johnson, Young Zee and B-Real.

== Commercial performance ==
Heavily anticipated, D12 World debuted at the top of the US, UK, Irish, Canadian, Australian and NZ albums charts. It debuted at number 2 in Germany and also in the top 5 in Switzerland and Norway. It debuted in the top 10 in Sweden, Denmark, France, Belgium, and the Netherlands.

It sold about 544,000 records in its first week of release in the United States alone. Debuting at number one on the Billboard 200, the album ended the first five-week run of singer Usher's best-selling album, Confessions. On the week of May 22, 2004, Usher's Confessions regained the Billboard 200's number-one spot, sending D12 World to number two. The album went on to have the best performing first-week sales for a hip hop release of that year until the release of Eminem's Encore that November. Ultimately, the album was certified double platinum, having a twenty-eight week stay on the chart overall.

The album debuted at number one on the UK Albums Chart with approximately 76,666 copies sold during the first week of release. Ultimately, the album was certified platinum; total sales of the album stand at 323,649 as of December 2017.

"My Band", the first single, was also successful, reaching number one in Australia and on the US Rhythmic Top 40, the Top 5 in the UK and Germany, and Top 10 on the Billboard Hot 100.

== Critical reception ==
Professional ratings
Aggregate scores
Source	Rating
Metacritic	58/100
Review scores
Source	Rating
AllMusic	3/5 stars
Blender	3/5 stars
Entertainment Weekly	B+
The Guardian	3/5 stars
HipHopDX	3.5/5 stars
PopMatters	6/10
Rolling Stone	3/5 stars
Spin	B−
Stylus	3/10
Vibe	3.5/5 stars

Upon release, D12 World received mixed reviews from critics. At Metacritic, which assigns a normalized rating out of 100 to reviews from mainstream critics, the album received an average score of 58, based on 13 reviews, indicating "mixed or average reviews".

== Track listing ==
No.	Title	Writer(s)	Producer(s)	Length
1.	"Git Up"	Marshall Mathers; Ondre Moore; Von Carlisle; Luis Resto; Steve King	Eminem; Luis Resto^{[a]}	4:03
2.	"Loyalty" (featuring Obie Trice)	Mathers; Denaun Porter; Carlisle; Moore; Rufus Johnson; DeShaun Holton; Obie Trice; Resto	Eminem; Resto^{[a]}	5:54
3.	"Just Like U"	Johnson; Tony Cottrell	Hi-Tek; Eminem^{[a]}; Resto^{[a]}	3:31
4.	"I'll Be Damned"	Porter; Carlisle; Moore; Johnson	Mr. Porter; Eminem^{[a]}; Resto^{[a]}	4:21
5.	"Dude" (skit)	Mathers	Eminem	1:14
6.	"My Band"	Mathers; Porter; Carlisle; Moore; Johnson; Holton; Resto; King	Eminem; Resto^{[a]}	4:58
7.	"U R the One"	Porter; Carlisle; Moore; Johnson; Holton; Mike Elizondo; Michael Richardson	Mr. Porter	4:19
8.	"6 in the Morning (Come on In)"	Mathers; Porter; Carlisle; Moore; Resto	Eminem; Resto^{[a]}	4:38
9.	"How Come"	Mathers; Porter; Holton; Bryan Johnson; Dewitt Moore	Witt & Pep	4:09
10.	"Leave Dat Boy Alone"	Mathers; Porter; Carlisle; Moore; Andy Thelusma; Resto	Red Spyda; Eminem^{[a]}; Resto^{[a]}	5:23
11.	"Get My Gun"	Mathers; Porter; Carlisle; Moore; Johnson; Holton; Resto; King	Eminem; Resto^{[a]}	4:34
12.	"Bizarre" (skit)	Johnson; Mathers	Eminem	1:21
13.	"Bitch" (featuring Deanna Johnson)	Mathers; Porter; Carlisle; Moore; Johnson; Holton; Resto	Eminem; Resto^{[a]}	4:56
14.	"Steve's Coffee House" (skit)	Steve Berman; Mathers	Eminem	0:51
15.	"D-12 World"	Porter; Carlisle; Moore; Johnson; Holton; Kanye West	Kanye West	3:10
16.	"40 Oz."	Mathers; Carlisle; Johnson; Holton; Mark Williams; Joe Kent	Trackboyz	4:02
17.	"Commercial Break" (featuring Young Zee)	Dewayne Battle; Porter	Mr. Porter	1:12
18.	"American Psycho II" (featuring B-Real)	Mathers; Carlisle; Moore; Johnson; Louis Freese; Andre Young; Elizondo	Dr. Dre; Mike Elizondo	3:44
19.	"Bugz '97" (skit; performed by Bugz)	Karnail Pitts; Mathers	Eminem	1:05
20.	"Good Die Young"	Porter; Carlisle; Moore; Johnson; Holton; Shelton Rivers; J. R. Rotem; Paul Williams	Mr. Porter; Essman^{[b]}	5:56
21.	"Keep Talkin'" (bonus track)	Mathers; Carlisle; Moore; Johnson; Holton; Gasner Hughes; Tonyatta Martinez; Matthew Moore	Night & Day; Eminem^{[a]}; Resto^{[a]}	4:28

Special edition bonus disc
No.	Title	Writer(s)	Producer(s)	Length
1.	"Barbershop"	Marshall Mathers; Denaun Porter; Von Carlisle; Ondre Moore; Rufus Johnson; DeShaun Holton	Mr. Porter	4:23
2.	"Slow Your Roll"	Mathers; Porter; Carlisle; Moore; Johnson; Holton; Luis Resto	Eminem	4:25
Total length:				86:37

Deluxe edition bonus DVD
No.	Title	Writer(s)	Producer(s)	Length
1.	"Making of the Album/Behind the Scenes" (featurette)			29:14
2.	"My Band" (uncensored music video)	Marshall Mathers; Denaun Porter; Von Carlisle; Ondre Moore; Rufus Johnson; DeShaun Holton; Luis Resto; Steve King	Eminem; Luis Resto^{[a]}	5:44
3.	"40 Oz." (uncensored music video)	Mathers; Carlisle; Johnson; Holton; Mark Williams; Joe Kent	Trackboyz	4:02
Total length:				116:49

Notes

- ^{^[a]} signifies an additional producer.
- ^{^[b]} signifies a co-producer.
- "Bugz" is taken from the song "Desperados", performed by DJ Butter, Eminem, Proof, Bugz & the Almighty Dreadnaughtz.
- "Just Like U" does not appear on the clean version of the album.
- "Leave Dat Boy Alone" features additional vocals by 50 Cent.
- "Get My Gun" is an unlockable song in the 2006 open-world game Scarface: The World Is Yours.
- "Barbershop" can be found on the Barbershop 2: Back in Business soundtrack.
- The clean version of the album allows "ass" to be uncensored but few uses of the word "hell", some references to alcohol use, most references to drugs, sexual content, and violence are edited out, although all sound effects remain intact.
- "6 in the Morning (Come on In)" was leaked in the bootleg mixtape Straight From The Lab

Sample credits

- "Git Up" contains a sample from "The Name Game" by Shirley Ellis
- "Just Like U" contains a sample from "Sir Galahad" by Rick Wakeman.
- "U R the One" contains a sample from "Girl Callin'" by Chocolate Milk
- "Good Die Young" contains a sample from "Screen Kiss" by Thomas Dolby
- "Keep Talkin'" contains samples from "Tortuga" by Starwood and "Halftime" by Nas

== Personnel ==
- B-Real – guest appearance
- Steve Baughman – mixing
- Rondell Beene – skit
- Bizarre – skit
- Joe Borges – assistant
- Bugz – skit
- Tony Campana – engineer
- Richard Castro – skit
- Larry Chatman – project coordinator
- Mike "Chav" Chavarria – engineer
- D12 – group
- Dr. Dre – producer, mixing
- Mike Elizondo – keyboards
- Eminem – producer, executive producer, mixing, skit
- Essman – producer
- 50 Cent – skit
- Brian "Big Bass" Gardner – mastering
- Richard Hunt – engineer
- Deanna Johnson – guest appearance
- Steven King – bass, guitar, engineer, mixing, skit
- Kuniva – skit
- Night and Day – producer
- Mr. Porter – producer
- Proof – skit
- Red Spyda – keyboards, producer
- Luis Resto – keyboards, producer
- Michael Strange – engineer
- Obie Trice – guest appearance
- Sacha Waldman – photography
- Young Zee – skit
- Kanye West – producer
- Paul Williams – songwriter
- J. R. Rotem – keyboards, songwriter

== Charts ==
=== Weekly charts ===
Weekly chart performance for D12 World
Chart (2004)	Peak position
Australian Albums (ARIA)	1
Australian Urban Albums (ARIA)	1
Austrian Albums (Ö3 Austria)	5
Belgian Albums (Ultratop Flanders)	9
Belgian Albums (Ultratop Wallonia)	38
Canadian Albums (Billboard)	1
Canadian R&B Albums (Nielsen SoundScan)	1
Danish Albums (Hitlisten)	6
Dutch Albums (Album Top 100)	9
Finnish Albums (Suomen virallinen lista)	20
French Albums (SNEP)	9
German Albums (Offizielle Top 100)	2
Hungarian Albums (MAHASZ)	33
Irish Albums (IRMA)	1
Italian Albums (FIMI)	16
Japanese Albums (Oricon)	2
New Zealand Albums (RMNZ)	1
Norwegian Albums (VG-lista)	5
Scottish Albums (Official Charts)	1
Spanish Albums (PROMUSICAE)	17
Swedish Albums (Sverigetopplistan)	6
Swiss Albums (Schweizer Hitparade)	3
UK Albums (Official Charts)	1
UK R&B Albums (Official Charts)	1
US Billboard 200	1
US Top R&B/Hip-Hop Albums (Billboard)	1

=== Year-end charts ===
Year-end chart performance for D12 World
Chart (2004)	Position
Australian Albums (ARIA)	34
Belgian Albums (Ultratop Flanders)	61
Dutch Albums (Album Top 100)	59
German Albums (Offizielle Top 100)	34
Swiss Albums (Schweizer Hitparade)	64
UK Albums (OCC)	62
US Billboard 200	30
US Top R&B/Hip-Hop Albums (Billboard)	17
Worldwide Albums (IFPI)	18

== Certifications ==
Certifications for D12 World
Region	Certification	Certified units/sales
Australia (ARIA)	Platinum	70,000^{^}
Denmark (IFPI Danmark)	Platinum	20,000^{‡}
Germany (BVMI)	Gold	100,000^{^}
Japan (RIAJ)	Platinum	250,000^{^}
New Zealand (RMNZ)	Platinum	15,000^{^}
United Kingdom (BPI)	Platinum	323,649
United States (RIAA)	2× Platinum	2,000,000^{^}
^{^} Shipments figures based on certification alone.^{‡} Sales+streaming figures based on certification alone.
