= The Christianaires =

American black gospel music group

- Origin: Detroit, Michigan
- Genres: urban contemporary gospel, traditional black gospel, gospel music
- Years active: 1989–2004
- Labels: Muscle Shoals, Atlanta International, A&M, Aircentral, Compendia, CGI, Platinum, Marxan
- Past members: Arnold Brown; Ronald Brown; Paul Porter; Tyrone Porter; George Carter; Charles Porter
- Website: malaco.com/Catalog/Gospel/The-Christianaires/list.php

The Christianaires was an American black gospel music group from Sontag, Mississippi, they were active from 1983 until 2004. At its inception, The group consisted of two sibling pairs, two brothers, Arnold and Ronald Brown, and two more brothers, Paul and Tyrone Porter. Later on with the subtraction of Paul Porter and Ronald Brown, the group added George Carter and Charles Porter. They released ten albums with various labels during their tenure, and those were 1989's Walking with Me, 1990's Ain't No Way I Could and Another Step Forward, 1993's The Vision Becomes Clearer, 1995's Thru the Storm and Reaching Out, 1997's Saints Hold On, 1998's Standing Room Only, 2001's Thank You, and 2004's Stand Up! Live. The group's albums Another Step Forward, The Vision Becomes Clearer, Standing Room Only, and Thank You charted on the Billboard Gospel Albums chart.

== Background ==
The Detroit, Michigan-based black gospel group, The Christianaires started in 1983 and ceased in 2004. They were made up of James Lee two pairs of siblings from their outset the brothers, Arnold and Ronald Brown, and the other two brothers, Paul and Tyrone Porter, which they were cousins the Browns and Porters. They would add with the departure of two of their members Paul Porter and Ronald Brown, the group would replace them with George Carter and Charles Porter.

== History ==
The quartet released ten albums from 1989 until 2004, with four of them charting on the Billboard Gospel Albums chart. The releases were with various labels over the course of the group's tenure, and those albums were: 1989's Walking with Me, 1990's Ain't No Way I Could and Another Step Forward, 1993's The Vision Becomes Clearer, 1995's Thru the Storm and Reaching Out, 1997's Saints Hold On, 1998's Standing Room Only, 2001's Thank You, and 2004's Stand Up! Live. The four albums that charted on the Gospel Albums chart were: Another Step Forward at No. 31, The Vision Becomes Clearer at No. 17, Standing Room Only at No. 17, and Thank You at No. 8. The last one charted on the Independent Albums chart at No. 34.

== Members ==
- Anthony Brown
- Ronald Brown
- Paul Porter
- Tyrone Porter (Deceased)
- George Carter
- Charles Porter
- James Lee (Deceased)

== Discography ==
List of albums, with selected chart positions
Title	Album details	Peak chart positions	
Title	Album details	US Gos	US Indie
Walking with Me	Released: 1989; Label: Muscle Shoals; CD, digital download	–	–
Ain't No Way I Could	Released: 1990; Label: Atlanta International; CD, digital download	–	–
Another Step Forward	Released: 1990; Label: Muscle Shoals; CD, digital download	31	–
The Vision Becomes Clearer	Released: 1993; Label: A&M; CD, digital download	17	–
Thru the Storm	Released: 1995; Label: Aircentral; CD, digital download	–	–
Reaching Out	Released: 1996; Label: Compendia; CD, digital download	–	–
Saints Hold On	Released: 1997; Label: CGI; CD, digital download	–	–
Standing Room Only	Released: 1998; Label: Platinum; CD, digital download	17	–
Thank You	Released: 2001; Label: Marxan; CD, digital download	8	34
Stand Up! Live	Released: 2004; Label: Marxan; CD, digital download	–	–
