= Proof (rapper) =

American rapper (1973–2006)

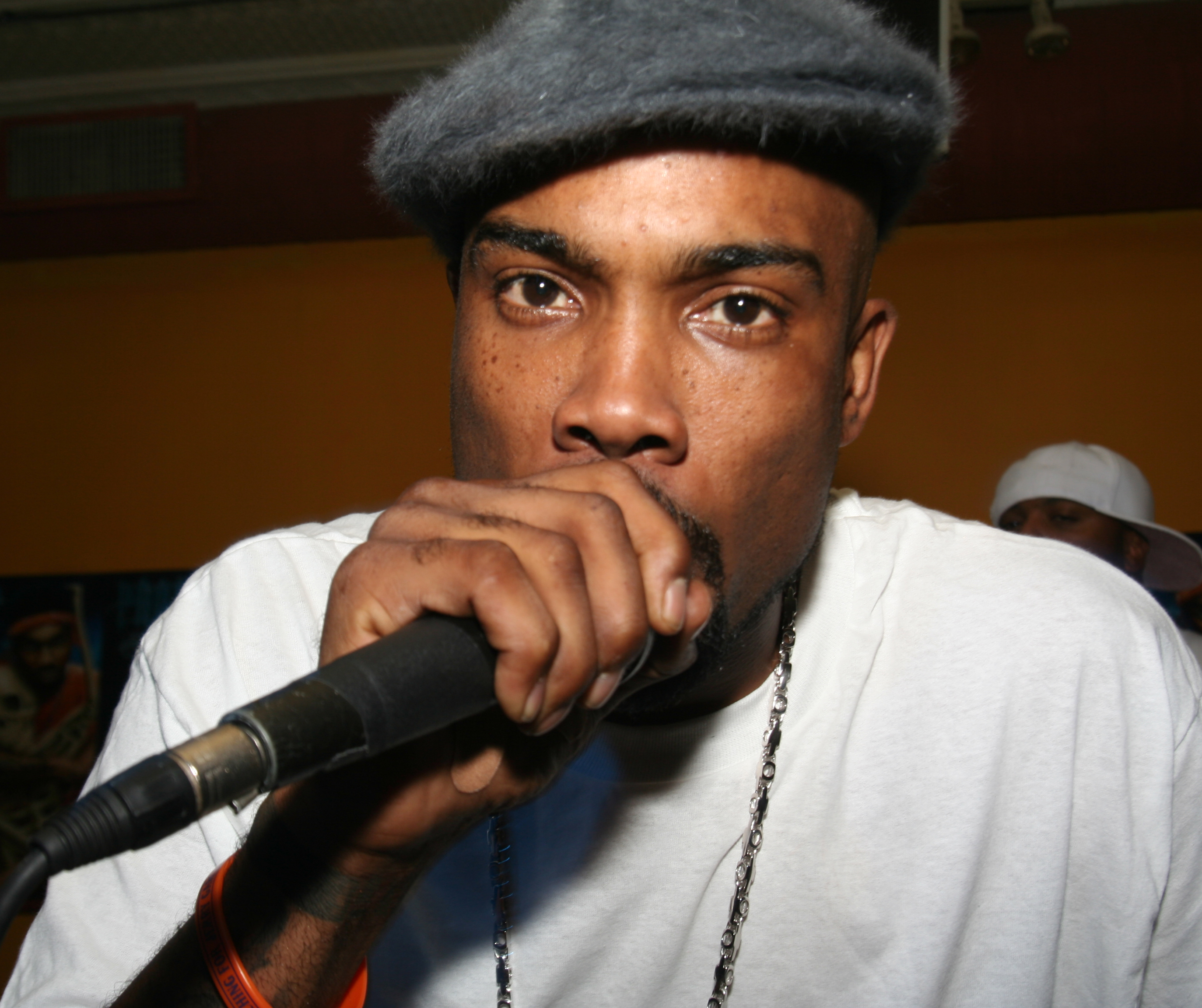
- Proof in 2005

Background information
- Also known as: Big Proof; Derty Harry; Doody; DJ Seven Duece; Oil Can Harry
- Born: DeShaun Dupree Holton; October 2, 1973; Detroit, Michigan, U.S.
- Died: April 11, 2006 (aged 32) Detroit, Michigan, U.S.
- Cause of death: Gunshot wounds
- Genres: Hip-hop; hardcore hip-hop; pop rap; battle rap
- Occupations: Rapper; songwriter; hype man; actor
- Works: Proof discography
- Years active: 1989–2006
- Labels: Iron Fist; Shady Records
- Formerly of: Soul Intent; D12; 5 Elementz; Funky Cowboys; Promatic; Goon Sqwad
- Website: www.prooflegacyfoundation.org

DeShaun Dupree Holton (October 2, 1973 – April 11, 2006), known professionally as Proof, was an American rapper and actor From Detroit, Michigan. He was a member of the groups Soul Intent, 5 Elementz, Funky Cowboys, Promatic, Goon Sqwad, and D12. A close friend of rapper Eminem since childhood, Proof was often a hype man at Eminem's concerts.

== Early life ==
Holton was born in Detroit, Michigan, to Sharallene "Pepper" Holton, a single mother. His father, McKinley Jackson, was a music producer who left to pursue his career prior to Holton's birth. Holton was close friends with Eminem from a young age.

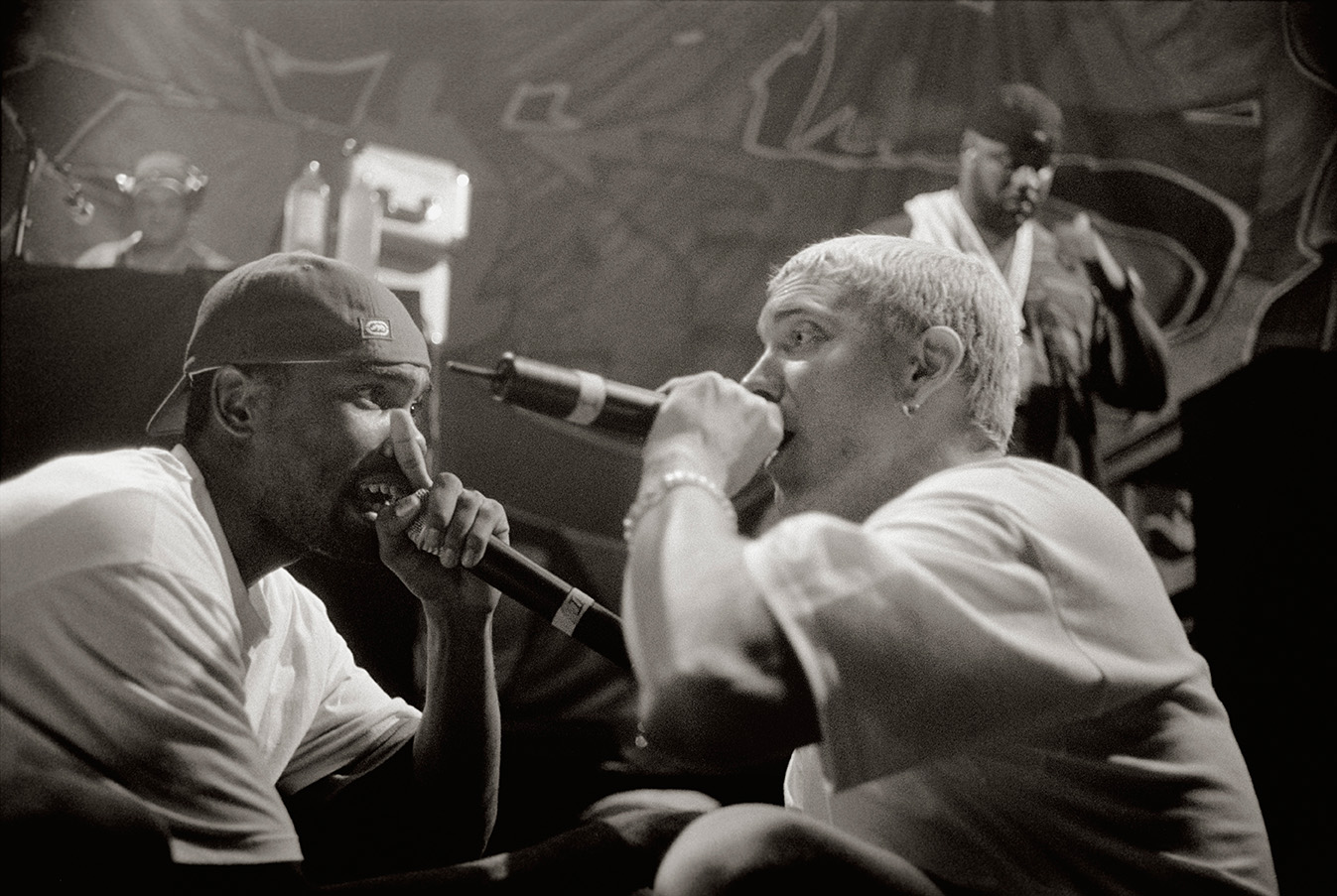
Proof and Eminem performing at Juice Jam in Munich, Germany, in 1999

== Career ==
Originally known as Maximum, under the moniker "Proof", Holton first rose to national prominence when he formed D12, "The Dirty Dozen", in 1996 with his friends Eminem, Bizarre, Mr. Porter, and a high school friend Eye-Kyu. Shortly after that, Proof recruited two friends, B-Flat and Dirty Ratt, to the group. This created the first lineup of D12. Bizarre, Denaun, and Eminem, could not make it to the studio sessions because they were also working with their other groups. Proof decided to break up this version of the group in 1996.

Proof later reformed the group in mid-1996. This time Proof called Bizarre and Eminem. He also asked Denaun who brought in Kuniva. Bizarre invited MC Bugz, a childhood friend of B-Flat and Dirty Ratt, who had previously parted ways with D12.

In 2000, Proof toured with Eminem, Dr. Dre, Ice Cube, and Snoop Dogg in the Up In Smoke Tour, performing as a hype man for Eminem. He gained further exposure in 2001 with the release of Devil's Night, D12's debut album on Shady and Interscope Records. The following year, Proof collaborated with Dogmatic on their joint album Promatic which received positive reviews. He also joined Eminem's "Anger Management" tour in support of the release. He appeared in the film 8 Mile along with Eminem and Xzibit. Proof appeared as Lil' Tic, a freestyle rapper who rap battles the main character, B-Rabbit, played by Eminem. To capitalize on the publicity from the film, Proof released a six-song EP called Electric CoolAid Acid Testing. Proof also starred in a cameo role, alongside the rest of D12 (except for Eminem), in The Longest Yard, appearing as "Basketball Convicts" during the credits.

=== Solo work ===
Proof released a solo album featuring collaborations with 50 Cent, Method Man, Nate Dogg, B-Real of Cypress Hill, T3 of Slum Village, Mudd of 5 Elementz, Obie Trice, MC Breed, Rude Jude, King Gordy, Swifty McVay, Eminem and D12. Proof said that he did not produce the record with Shady Records or Aftermath because he wanted to "build his own thing". Called Searching for Jerry Garcia, the album was released on August 9, 2005, on his own Iron Fist Records label in conjunction with Alliance Entertainment's IDN Distribution, ten years to the day following Grateful Dead frontman Jerry Garcia's death. It contained the prophetic song "Kurt Kobain" in which he wrote of his own death and "passing the sign" to 1st Born as his protégé once he was gone. Proof has said that he considered Garcia to be a "genius" who suffered from common character flaws. Proof has stated his admiration for Garcia's eclectic style, saying that Garcia "went against the grain". Proof stated how he wanted to be remembered in an interview with SOHH.com shortly after his album release: "I want people to say that I was a true artist, that I did it best and stayed true to Hip Hop roots [...] I'd want people to understand I did it for the love, not for the charts." The album received favorable reviews, which commented on its "eclectic" and "introspective" nature. Despite its list of guest appearances and favorable reviews, the release did not make a significant impact on the charts. Besides these, he recorded during his Gold Coast tour in 2006, which was exactly two weeks before his death, a song with "Liquid Silva" from Australia.

== Death ==
On April 11, 2006, Holton was shot and killed after a dispute broke out during a game of pool at the now-closed C.C.C. Club on 8 Mile Road in Detroit. A pool game between Holton and Keith L. Bender Jr. turned into a heated argument and then escalated into a physical altercation, during which club bouncer Mario Etheridge, who was Bender's cousin, fired a warning shot into the air. There have been many conflicting reports about Holton and Bender's roles in the shooting, but it was reported that Holton then shot Bender in the head during the altercation. Bender was not immediately killed by the gunshot but died a week later from his injuries. Etheridge responded by shooting Holton three times, once in the head and twice in the chest, killing him at the scene. At the time of his death, Holton's blood alcohol content was 0.32. His lawyer, David Gorosh, accused police and the media of being "reckless" for suggesting that his client fired the first shots without having any hard evidence. A few weeks after both men's deaths, Bender's family filed a wrongful death claim against Holton's estate. Authorities determined that Etheridge was acting lawfully in defense of another; however, he was found guilty of carrying a concealed weapon and discharging a firearm inside a building. On October 26, Etheridge was sentenced to time served.

On April 19, 2006, a service for Holton was held in the Fellowship Chapel in Detroit to a full house of 2,660 people, including his friends and rappers; Eminem, members of D12, Royce da 5'9", Obie Trice, 50 Cent, Dr. Dre, Xzibit, Lloyd Banks, Young Buck, and Treach, as well as thousands more mourning outside. He was then buried in Woodlawn Cemetery.

=== Alternate account ===
Seven months after Holton's death, his close friend Reginald "Mudd" Moore, who was with him at the nightclub, gave an exclusive interview with XXL magazine where he told a different account of what happened that night. In Moore's version of the events, the night started out with him and Holton and two of their friends barhopping. They arrived at the club at around 3:00 a.m., where the fight between Bender and Holton broke out over a pool game. Etheridge fired two shots into the air to break up the fight, but instead the shots caused panic. Moore then claimed that an intoxicated Holton pushed him out of the way, reached for his own gun and fired once into the air. Bender then attacked Holton from behind in attempt to free the weapon from his grasp, and Etheridge then opened fire in the direction of Holton and Bender, killing both men.

=== Legacy ===
In 2008, Welsh singer-songwriter Jem dedicated the song "You Will Make It" to Holton's memory on her second album Down to Earth. In the liner notes, she said "For your families and friends and for all those who experienced the tragedy of sudden loss". In early 2009, Jem revealed "The track is about losing someone and I wrote it the day after his friend Proof was murdered. I was in Detroit with Eminem's friends, who I happened to be recording with, when it happened". Eminem eulogized his friend with the unreleased track "Difficult", which leaked to the public in 2010. Eminem further eulogized Proof on Recovery with "You're Never Over".

== Discography ==
- Anywhere EP (1996)
- Electric Coolaid Acid Testing EP (2002)
- I Miss the Hip Hop Shop (2004)
- Searching for Jerry Garcia (2005)

With D12

- The Underground EP (1997)
- Devil's Night (2001)
- D12 World (2004)
- Return of the Dozen, Vol. 1 (2008, posthumous release)
- D12 Forever (Vol. 1) (2026, posthumous release)

With Funky Cowboys

- Livin' Proof: Funky Cowboys Vol 1 (2017) (Recorded in 1996)
- Livin' Proof: Funky Cowboys Vol 2 (2018) (Recorded in 1996/1997)

With Gorillaz

- "911" (with Gorillaz, D12, and Terry Hall) (2001)
- "The Manifesto" (with Gorillaz and Trueno) (2025) — Posthumous feature on Gorillaz's single released on October 8, 2025. The track appears on their album The Mountain (released on February 27, 2026).

== Filmography ==
=== Film ===
Year	Film	Role	Notes
2002	8 Mile	Lil' Tic	
2004	Pauly Shore Is Dead	Himself	Deleted Scene
2005	The Longest Yard	Basketball Convict	
2005	Eminem Presents: The Anger Management Tour	Himself	
2005	Live From New York City	Himself	
2005	D12: Live in Chicago	Himself	Released straight to video
2006	Time a Tell	Himself	Recorded three months before his death
2006	Rap Sheet: Hip-Hop and The Cops	Himself	
2025	STANS	Himself	Archive footage

=== Television ===
Year	Title	Role	Notes
2002	Saturday Night Live	Himself	Season 27, Episode 19: Kirsten Dunst/Eminem
2005	Punk’d	Himself	Season 4, Episode 8

=== Video games ===
Year	Title	Role	Notes
2005	Gang Life: Crime Wars	Dayz	Voice and likeness

== Videography ==
- "Age Ain't Nothing But a Number" (1994), extra
- "The Real Slim Shady" (2000), extra
- "The Way I Am" (2000)
- "Shit on You" (2000)
- "Purple Hills" (2001)
- "Fight Music" (2001)
- "Rock City" – Royce da 5’9” (2002)
- "Rap Name" – Obie Trice (2002), extra
- "Without Me" – Eminem (2002), extra
- "Superman" – Eminem (2002), extra
- "Lose Yourself" – Eminem (2002), Hype man
- "In Da Club" – 50 Cent (2003), extra
- "Got Some Teeth" – Obie Trice (2003), extra
- "Git Up" (2004)
- "My Band" (2004)
- "40 Oz." (2004)
- "How Come" (2004)
- "U R the One" (2004)
- "Like Toy Soldiers" (2004) – acting as Bugz
- "Mosh" (2004) – Archive footage
- "Mockingbird" (2005) – Archive footage
- "Ass Like That" – Eminem (2005)
- "Rockstar" – Bizarre (2005)
- "Hip Hop" – Bizarre (2005)
- "Welcome 2 Detroit" – Trick-Trick (2005), extra
- "Gurls Wit Da Boom" (2005)
- "Walk on Water" (2017) – Archive footage
- "What If?" (2026) – Archive footage

== See also ==
- List of murdered hip hop musicians
- List of homicides in Michigan
