= Denaun Porter =

American rapper (born 1978)

Mr. Porter
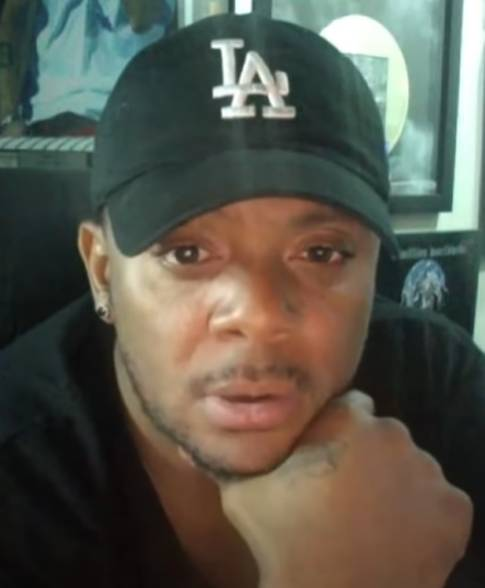
- Mr. Porter in 2018

Background information
- Also known as: Mr. Porter; Kon Artis; Denaun; Naunie
- Born: Denaun Montez Porter; December 7, 1978 (age 47); North Carolina, U.S.
- Origin: Detroit, Michigan, U.S.
- Genres: Hip hop
- Occupations: Rapper; songwriter; record producer
- Years active: 1996–present
- Labels: My Own Planet; Mr. Porter Productions; Bad Half; Interscope; Shady (current)
- Member of: Read the PDF
- Formerly of: D12; Da Brigade

Denaun Montez Porter (born December 7, 1978), also known by the stage names Mr. Porter, Kon Artis, or Denaun, is an American rapper and record producer. He was a member of Detroit hip hop group D12.

He has a close association with rapper Eminem, producing for him and often appearing on his tours, Porter has produced for a multitude of other notable artists such as 50 Cent, Royce da 5'9", The Game, Pharoahe Monch, Method Man, Nas, Snoop Dogg, Jadakiss and more. He formed the supergroup Read the PDF with fellow Aftermath Entertainment producers, Dem Jointz and Focus… in 2022.

== Early life ==
Born in North Carolina, Porter moved with his family to Mississippi and later to Detroit when he was 10 years old. His father, Charles, is a gospel singer and former member of the Blind Boys of Alabama and the Christianaires; his mother is a writer.

== Career ==
Porter started his career with D12 in the mid-1990s. He was inspired to rap and produce after hearing A Tribe Called Quest's song, "Bonita Applebum". Mr. Porter was introduced to Eminem by fellow D12 member Eye-Kyu in 1995. Throughout his solo career, he has both produced and performed vocally as a rapper and singer, producing songs for many notable artists such as Eminem, DMX, Scram Jones, Trick-Trick, Obie Trice, Dwele, Busta Rhymes, Rapsody, Snoop Dogg, Royce da 5'9" and 50 Cent (producing the 2003 song "P.I.M.P."). Around this time, Porter worked on the singer Bilal's second album, Love for Sale.

He is also officially signed to Eminem's label Shady Records as a producer and has worked with Shady artists Slaughterhouse, Bad Meets Evil, 50 Cent and D12. Mr. Porter is now most notably seen as a hype man in Eminem's live shows, replacing fellow D12 member Proof who died in 2006.

Porter was a co-executive producer, with Eminem and Royce da 5'9", for Bad Meets Evil's debut EP Hell: The Sequel. He also has a cameo appearance in their music video "Fast Lane", as well as "Forever" by Drake featuring Kanye West, Lil Wayne and Eminem, and Eminem's single "No Love" featuring Lil Wayne and then in 2013 he featured in Eminem's "Rap God" video alongside other members of Slaughterhouse. In 2020, he featured in the music video of Eminem's single "Godzilla" featuring Juice WRLD.

On April 2, 2012, Porter formally announced that he had left D12. He stated that he wanted to focus on being a solo artist and producer, but clarified that he holds no animosity toward other members of the group. Two years later in late 2014, he rejoined D12 and contributed a verse to the song "Bane" on the Shady Records compilation album, Shady XV, released on November 24, 2014. In January 2015, he appeared on D12's The Devil's Night Mixtape.

In 2022, he created a supergroup with fellow producers and Aftermath’s alums, Dem Jointz and Focus....

== Discography ==
=== Instrumental albums ===
- Porter Chops Glasper (stylized as pOrTeR cHoPs gLaSpEr) (2013)
- The Great Depression A.P. (2018)
- Letter 2 Sydney (2019)

=== EPs ===
- Stuff in My Backpack (stylized as sTuFf In My BaCkPaCk) (2015)
- Connect (2016)
- While You Wait (2019)

=== Collaboration albums ===
- Devil's Night (with D12) (2001)
- D12 World (with D12) (2004)

=== Mixtapes ===
- The Devil's Night Mixtape (with D12) (2015)

=== Guest appearances ===
Year	Song	Performer	Album
1996	"Maxine"	Eminem	Infinite
1996	"Backstabber"	Eminem	Infinite
1997	"What, What"	Bizarre, Kuniva	Attack of the Weirdos
2001	"The Do Do"	DJ Butter	Shit Happens
2001	"Skull Therapy 2002"	Paradime	Vices
2002	"She Devil"	Tech N9NE, D12	Absolute Power
2003	"Spread Yo Shit"	Obie Trice	Cheers
2003	"Bend a Corner"	Ras Kass	Re-Up: The Compilation
2004	"Look at Me Now"	Young Buck	Straight Outta Cashville
2004	"We Some Dogs"	Method Man	Tical 0: The Prequel
2004	"Crooked Letter I"	Method Man	Tical 0: The Prequel
2005	"Porno Bitches"	Bizarre	Hannicap Circus
2005	"She's a Pro"	Black Rob	The Black Rob Report
2005	"Slippin"	Lil' Kim	The Naked Truth
2005	"Slum Elementz"	Proof, T3, Mudd	Searching for Jerry Garcia
2005	"Big Mistake"	Trick-Trick	The People vs.
2005	"Let's Roll"	Trick-Trick	The People vs.
2006	"They're Out to Get Me"	Busta Rhymes	The Big Bang
2006	"Keep It Live"	Black Milk	Broken Wax
2006	"Whatever You Want"	Swifty McVay	Eminem Presents: The Re-Up
2007	"When the Gun Draws"	Pharoahe Monch	Desire
2007	"Trilogy"	Pharoahe Monch	Desire
2007	"Beneath the Diamonds"	DJ Drama	Gangsta Grillz: The Album
2008	"Getting Bitches"	Guilty Simpson	Ode to the Ghetto
2008	"Kinda Live"	Guilty Simpson	Ode to the Ghetto
2008	"Send a Ni*ga Home"	Bishop Lamont	The Confessional
2008	"Get 'Em"	Salam Wreck	Trouble Soon
2009	"Mine in Thiz"	Royce Da 5'9"	Street Hop
2010	"Money"	Freeway and Jake One	The Stimulus Package
2010	"Closed Chapter"	Black Milk	Album of the Year
2011	"I Just Want to Fuck"	The Game	Purp & Patron
2011	"My Own Way"	Snoop Dogg	Doggumentary
2011	"Haile Selassie Karate"	Pharoahe Monch	W.A.R. (We Are Renegades)
2011	"I'm on Everything"	Bad Meets Evil	Hell: The Sequel
2011	"My Own Planet"	Royce Da 5'9"	Success Is Certain
2011	"Hit Me With Your Best Shot"	D12	Straight from the Lab Part 2
2012	"Got To Go"	Marv Won	Heavy Is the Head...
2012	"Goose Down"	Marv Won	Heavy Is the Head...
2012	"Make It Snow"	Tony Yayo, Bun B, Slim Thug	Sex, Drugs, & Hip-Hop
2013	"Sexual Healing"	Tony Yayo	Godfather of the Ghetto
2014	"Losing My Mind"	Pharoahe Monch	PTSD
2015	"This Corner"	—N/a	Southpaw: Original Motion Picture Soundtrack
2015	"Slow Stir"	Ro Spit, Marv Won, Young ROC	IV Life...
2016	"Quiet"	Royce Da 5'9", Tiara	Layers
2016	"Trouble on My Mind"	Kuniva	A History of Violence Vol. 2
2017	"Pimps & Hoes"	Swifty McVay	Grey Blood
2017	"Remind Me"	Eminem	Revival
2018	"Made Man"	PRhyme, Big K.R.I.T.	PRhyme 2
2019	"Petty"	Bizarre	Rufus
2020	"Yah Yah"	Eminem, Royce da 5'9", Black Thought, Q-Tip	Music to Be Murdered By
2020	"Friends"	Meidai	Rashad
2021	"Walkin in the Rain"	DMX, Nas	Exodus
2025	"My Friend"	Snoop Dogg	Iz It a Crime?

== Awards and nominations ==
Year	Nominee / work	Award	Result	Ref.
2002	The Eminem Show	Grammy Award for Album of the Year	Nominated	
2010	Recovery	Grammy Award for Album of the Year	Nominated	
