= D12 =

American hip hop group

- Origin: Detroit, Michigan, U.S.
- Genres: Midwestern hip-hop; horrorcore
- Years active: 1996–present
- Labels: My Brothers Keeper (current); Shady; Interscope (former)
- Members: Kuniva; Swifty McVay
- Past members: Eminem; Proof; Bizarre; Denaun Porter; Bugz; Fuzz Scoota; Eye-Kyu
- Website: allthingsd12.com

D12 (an initialism for the Dirty Dozen) is an American hip-hop group from Detroit, Michigan. Formed in 1996, the group achieved mainstream success with its lineup of de facto leader Eminem, Proof, Bizarre, Denaun Porter, Kuniva and Swifty McVay.

D12 had chart-topping albums in the United States, United Kingdom, and Australia during the early 2000s. The group released the albums Devil's Night in 2001 and D12 World in 2004, spawning numerous hit singles such as "Shit on You", "Purple Pills", "Fight Music", "My Band" and "How Come" throughout that period. Both albums were certified double platinum by the Recording Industry Association of America (RIAA).

In 2004, the group won the MTV Europe Music Award for Best Hip-Hop Act.

Since 2006, Eminem's hiatus and the death of Proof resulted in the group being less active in subsequent years. Between 2008 and 2015, D12 released three official mixtapes with the core lineup reduced to Bizarre, Kuniva and Swifty McVay, with isolated token appearances by Eminem and some contributions from Denaun Porter and Fuzz Scoota.

On August 31, 2018, Eminem released his tenth studio album Kamikaze, containing a song titled "Stepping Stone", announcing that D12 had officially disbanded.

On June 19, 2026, D12 released their third album D12 Forever, Volume 1 as a duo consisting of Kuniva and Swifty McVay.

On October 30, 2026, D12 released their new single called "Detroit State of Mind" for Detroit Love Day.

== History ==
=== Early career, The Underground EP and death of Bugz (1996–2000) ===
D12 was initially formed in 1996 by Proof who invited local Detroit rappers such as Bizarre, Bugz and Da Brigade members Denaun Porter and Kuniva. In 1997, they released their debut extended play, The Underground EP, which was recorded between 1996 and 1997. Eminem and Eye-Kyu had guest appearances on it.

Between 1997 and 1999, its members began establishing reputations locally. Bizarre was named Inner City Entertainment's "Flava of the Week" and went on to release an EP, Attack of the Weirdos. Along with Eminem, he became an honorary member of the Outsidaz. Proof won a freestyling competition run by The Source. In 1999, Bugz released These Streets EP, and made several appearances on other rappers' songs.

On May 21, 1999, Bugz was shot and killed. One of his final acts had been a request that Swifty McVay join the group. Eminem volunteered to replace Bugz; this led to him joining the group and form the core lineup of it. Despite having six members, each member of the group had an alter ego they displayed in their music, which meant that there were 12 personalities:

- Eminem is Slim Shady
- Proof is Derty Harry
- Bizarre is Peter S. Bizarre
- Kon Artis is Mr. Porter
- Kuniva is Hanz G. Rondell Beene
- Swift is Swifty McVay

=== Devil's Night, D12 World and death of Proof (2001–2007) ===
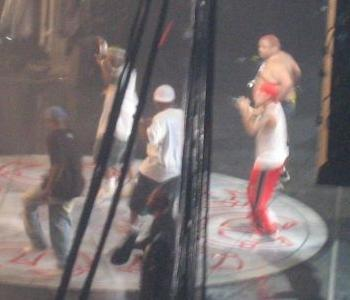
D12 performing at the Anger Management Tour in 2005

Their debut album, Devil's Night, referring to the tradition of setting unoccupied buildings on fire the night before Halloween, was released in June 2001. It debuted at number one on the U.S. and number two on the UK chart, also reaching the top of the Canadian charts. The album went on to sell four million albums worldwide and two million in the U.S.

D12 World was released on April 27, 2004, featuring production by Eminem, Mr. Porter, Dr. Dre and Kanye West, and guest appearances by Obie Trice on the track "Loyalty" and B-Real of Cypress Hill on the track "American Psycho II". It debuted at the top of the U.S., UK, and Australian albums charts, and at number two in Germany—selling over half a million records in its first week of release in the U.S. alone. "My Band", the album's first single, also reached number one in Australia, New Zealand and the U.S. rhythmic top forty, the top five in the UK and Germany, and the top ten on the Billboard Hot 100.

In 2005, Bizarre and Proof released their debut studio albums Hannicap Circus and Searching for Jerry Garcia. They debuted at numbers 48 and 65 on the U.S., respectively.

On April 11, 2006, Proof "pistol-whipped an unarmed man and shot him in the head", and was in turn fatally shot to death by the man's cousin. This was a turning point for D12, because this marked the departure of Eminem from the group.

Since then, Eminem was no longer a member of the group, having guest appearances only on two tracks, "Fame" on Return of the Dozen Vol. 2 (2011) and "Devil's Night Intro" on The Devil's Night Mixtape (2015). On December 5, 2006, Shady Records released Eminem Presents: The Re-Up which featured performances by Eminem, 50 Cent, Obie Trice, Stat Quo, Bobby Creekwater and Cashis while affiliated artists such as Lloyd Banks, Akon and Nate Dogg, made guest appearances. Some tracks were collaborative performances from D12 members, such as "Murder" by Bizarre and Kuniva and "Whatever You Want" by Swifty McVay and Mr. Porter. The track "Trapped" by Proof included an intro by Eminem paying his final respects saying, "Big Proof, rest in peace dudey we love you. We just wanna keep making you proud."

=== Mixtapes and leaving Shady Records (2008–2024) ===
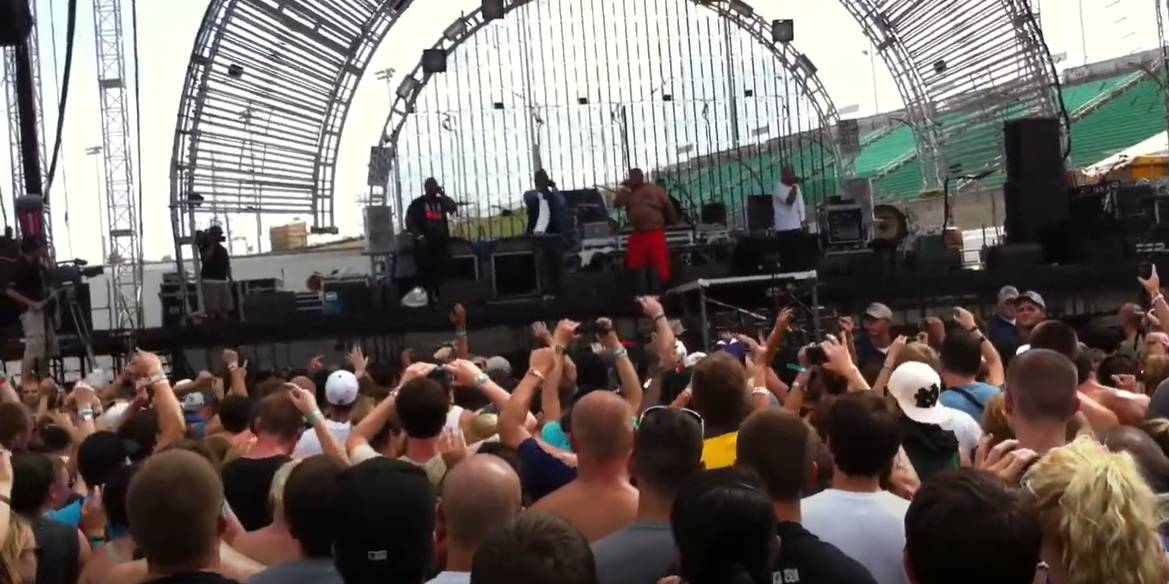
D12 performing at Kanrocksas Music Festival in 2011

On May 21, 2008, D12 released their first mixtape Return of the Dozen Vol. 1. In 2010, the group recorded "Hit Me with Your Best Shot" for Eminem's scrapped studio album Relapse 2. The mixtape Return of the Dozen Vol. 2 (2011) followed three years later. It featured Fuzz Scoota, a new member of the group. On August 5, 2011, D12 performed at the Kanrocksas Music Festival. In 2012, Bizarre and Mr. Porter left the group.

In January 2014, Mark Bass of the Bass Brothers confirmed that D12 had been recently recording at the F.B.T. studio and he had been mixing their recorded material. He also confirmed that Eminem was featured on at least three songs that had been completed. In February 2014, Bizarre confirmed that he was back in the group and that D12 would be releasing their third studio album during 2014. On August 25, 2014, a press release on Eminem's official website also revealed D12 to be featured on the label's upcoming two-disc compilation album, titled Shady XV. The album, released on November 24, 2014, featured one greatest hits disc and one disc with new material from a variety of Shady Records recording artists, including D12. Their new song was entitled "Bane", which features the return of Mr. Porter and was also produced by him.

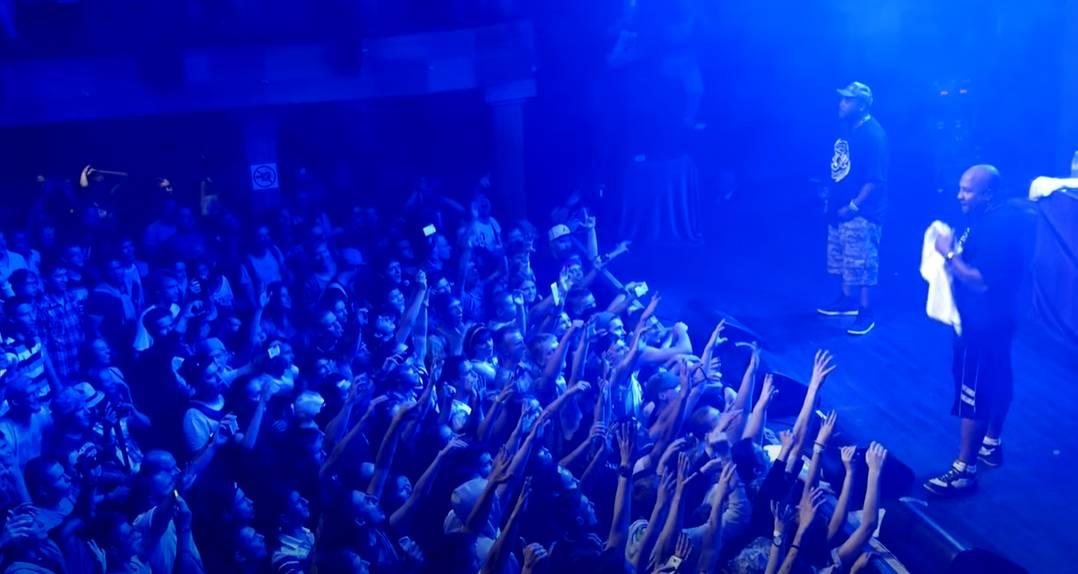
D12 performing in Moscow in 2015

On August 18, 2015, D12 confirmed on Tim Westwood TV that they had already recorded a large number of songs for the album and will release it "when the time is right." On October 1, 2015, it was announced that D12 would be releasing a new mixtape, The Devil's Night Mixtape. It was released on October 30, 2015 and featured Kxng Crooked, Kidd Kidd, Young Buck and Royce da 5'9". The mixtape was hosted by DJ Whoo Kid.

On August 31, 2018, Eminem released his tenth studio album Kamikaze, containing a song titled "Stepping Stone", announcing that D12 had officially disbanded.

In 2021, Devil's Night was re-released digitally as an expanded edition to celebrate the 20th anniversary of its release which featured three bonus tracks, an unreleased freestyle, the instrumentals, and an a capella edition of "Shit on You".

=== D12 Forever, Volume 1 (2025–present) ===
On December 29, 2025, D12 announced their first album in 22 years, D12 Forever, Volume 1.

The album's first single, "Tear It Down" featuring Xzibit and B-Real, was released on April 24, 2026.

D12 Forever, Volume 1 was released on the 25th anniversary of Devil's Night on June 19, 2026. It features unreleased verses by Proof and Bugz, and guest appearances by Melanie Rutherford, Method Man, George Clinton, Tech N9ne, King Iso, Sly Pyper, Ice-T and Proof's son, Eli Blessed.

== Members ==
Current members

- Kuniva (1996–present)
- Swifty McVay (1999–present)

Former members

- Eminem (1999–2006)
- Proof (1996–2006; his death)
- Bizarre (1996–2012, 2014–2018)
- Mr. Porter (1996–2012, 2014–2018)
- Bugz (1996–1999; his death)
- Fuzz Scoota (2011–2014)
- Eye-Kyu (1996-1997)

== Awards and nominations ==
Year	Ceremony	Award	Result
2002	ECHO Awards (for "Devil's Night")	Best Hip-Hop/Urban Artist (International)	Won
2004	MTV Europe Music Awards	Best Hip-Hop Act	Won
2004	MTV Europe Music Awards	Best Group	Nominated
2004	MTV Video Music Awards (for "My Band")	Video of the Year	Nominated
2004	MTV Video Music Awards (for "My Band")	Best Group Video	Nominated
2004	MTV Video Music Awards (for "My Band")	Best Rap Video	Nominated

== Discography ==
Studio albums

- Devil's Night (2001)
- D12 World (2004)
- D12 Forever, Volume 1 (2026)
