= Obie Trice discography =

Recordings by the American rapper

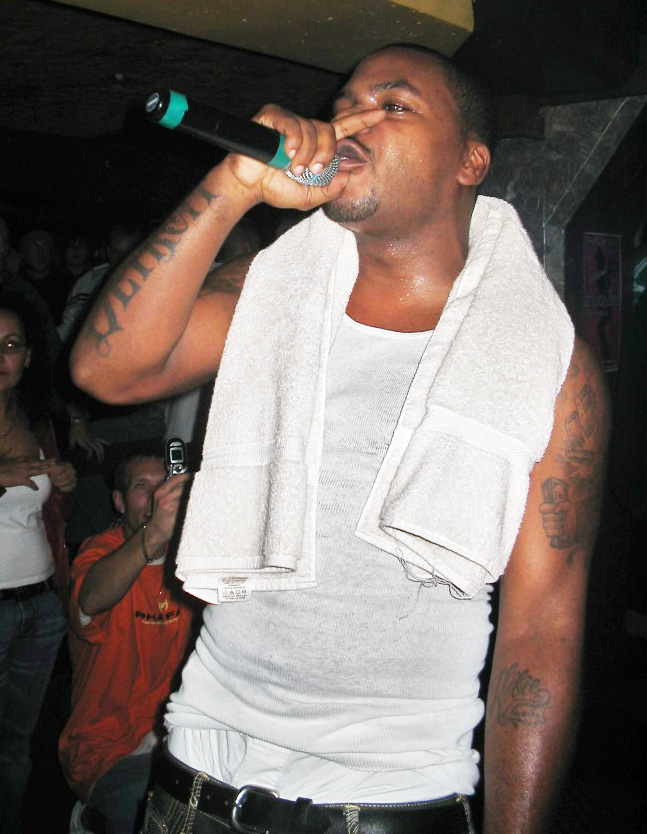
- Studio albums: 5
- Extended plays: 1
- Compilation albums: 1
- Singles: 15
- Music videos: 10
- Mixtapes: 4

The discography of American rapper Obie Trice consists of two major-label studio albums, three independent albums, 15 singles and four mixtapes. His major-label albums were released via Eminem's Shady/Interscope Records.

== Albums ==
=== Studio albums ===
List of albums, with selected details, chart positions and certifications
Title	Album details	Peak chart positions										Certifications
Title	Album details	US	US R&B	US Rap	AUS	CAN	IRE	NL	NZ	SWI	UK	Certifications
Cheers	Released: September 23, 2003; Label: Shady, Interscope; Format: CD, LP, cassette, digital download	5	3	—	24	2	11	41	10	36	11	RIAA: Gold; ARIA: Gold; BPI: Gold
Second Round's on Me	Released: August 15, 2006; Label: Shady, Interscope; Format: CD, LP, digital download	8	5	2	—	4	50	97	29	31	46	
Bottoms Up	Released: April 3, 2012; Label: Black Market Entertainment; Format: CD, digital download	130	18	15	—	—	—	—	—	—	—	
The Hangover	Released: August 7, 2015; Label: Black Market Entertainment; Format: CD, digital download	—	—	—	—	—	—	—	—	—	—	
The Fifth	Released: August 23, 2019; Label: Black Market Entertainment; Format: CD, digital download	—	—	—	—	—	—	—	—	—	—	
"—" denotes a recording that did not chart or was not released in that territory.

=== Compilation albums ===
- 2009: Special Reserve

=== Mixtapes ===
- 2003: The Bar Is Open (with DJ Green Lantern)
- 2006: Bar Shots (with DJ Whoo Kid)
- 2007: The Most Under Rated (with DJ Whoo Kid)
- 2012: Watch the Chrome (with DJ Whoo Kid)

=== EPs ===
- 2023: Long Story Longer Presents Kurupt and Obie Trice (with Long Story Longer & Kurupt)

== Singles ==
=== As lead artist ===
List of singles, with selected chart positions, showing year released and album name
Title	Year	Peak chart positions									Certifications	Album
Title	Year	US	US R&B	US Rap	AUS	IRE	NL	NZ	SWI	UK	Certifications	Album
"Rap Name"	2002	—	—	—	—	—	—	—	—	—		8 Mile soundtrack
"Got Some Teeth"	2003	54	33	12	15	10	17	8	—	8	ARIA: Gold	Cheers
"The Setup (You Don't Know)" (featuring Nate Dogg)	2004	73	39	19	52	43	—	—	53	32		Cheers
"Don't Come Down"	2004	—	—	—	—	—	—	—	—	—		Cheers
"Wanna Know"	2005	—	—	—	—	—	—	—	—	—		Second Round's on Me
"Snitch"^{[A]} (featuring Akon)	2006	—	111	—	39	44	—	—	—	44		Second Round's on Me
"Cry Now"	2006	—	—	—	—	—	—	—	—	—		Second Round's on Me
"Jamaican Girl" (featuring Brick & Lace)	2006	—	—	—	—	—	—	—	—	—		Second Round's on Me
"Got Hungry"	2009	—	—	—	—	—	—	—	—	—		Special Reserve
"Battle Cry" (featuring Adrian Rezza)	2011	—	—	—	—	—	—	—	—	—		Bottoms Up
"Spend the Day" (featuring Drey Skonie)	2012	—	—	—	—	—	—	—	—	—		Bottoms Up
"Spill My Drink"	2012	—	—	—	—	—	—	—	—	—		Bottoms Up
"Bang"	2013	—	—	—	—	—	—	—	—	—		The Hangover
"Ass" (featuring Magnedo7)	2016	—	—	—	—	—	—	—	—	—		The Fifth
"92"	2019	—	—	—	—	—	—	—	—	—		The Fifth
"—" denotes a recording that did not chart or was not released in that territory.

== Guest appearances ==
List of guest appearances, with other performing artists, showing year released and album name
Title	Year	Other performer(s)	Album
"Obie Trice (Skit)"	2001	D12	Devil's Night
"Drips"	2002	Eminem	The Eminem Show
"Love Me"	2002	Eminem, 50 Cent	8 Mile soundtrack
"Adrenaline Rush"	2002	—N/a	8 Mile soundtrack
"Go To Sleep"	2003	DMX, Eminem	Cradle 2 the Grave soundtrack
"Situations"	2003	King Gordy	The Entity
"Doe Rae Me"	2003	D12	Straight from the Lab
"No Coast All Stars"	2003	Baby Blak, Planet Asia	Once U Go Blak
"I'm Gone"	2004	DJ Kay Slay, Eminem	The Streetsweeper, Vol. 2
"Loyalty"	2004	D12	D12 World
"Spend Some Time"	2004	Eminem, Stat Quo, 50 Cent	Encore
"1000 Niggaz"	2004	Phat Kat, La Peace, Loe Louis, Killa Ghanz	The Undeniable LP
"Hennessey"	2004	2Pac	Loyal to the Game
"Doctor Doctor"	2005	Bizarre, Dion	Hannicap Circus
"Cell Block"	2005	Jaguar Wright	Divorcing Neo 2 Marry Soul
"72nd & Central"	2005	Proof, J-Hill	Searching for Jerry Garcia
"Drama Setter"	2005	Tony Yayo, Eminem	Thoughts of a Predicate Felon
"It Has Been Said"	2005	The Notorious B.I.G., Eminem, Diddy	Duets: The Final Chapter
"War"	2005	Trick-Trick	The People vs.
"We're Back"	2006	Eminem, Stat Quo, Bobby Creekwater, Ca$his	Eminem Presents: The Re-Up
"We Ride for Shady"	2006	Ca$his	Eminem Presents: The Re-Up
"Shake That" (Remix)	2006	Eminem, Nate Dogg, Bobby Creekwater	Eminem Presents: The Re-Up
"Cry Now" (Shady Remix)	2006	Kuniva, Bobby Creekwater, Ca$his, Stat Quo	Eminem Presents: The Re-Up
"Divine Intervention"	2006	The Alchemist	No Days Off
"I'm Back"	2006	The Alchemist	The Chemistry Files
"Sneak Preview"	2007	Madd Kapp, Sicknotes, Proof, King Gordy	Less Than Zero
"My Wayz R Shady"	2008	Daz Dillinger	Only on the Left Side
"Whatz Happening"	2008	40 Glocc, Livio	Outspoken 3
"Song Cry"	2010	Tuki, Greg C. Brown, K.I.D.D.	My Life
"That's the Way I Like It"	2011	40 Glocc, Spider Loc, Blaqthoven, Jayo Felony	The Graveyard Shift
"Mind on My Money (Money on My Mind)"	2013	Ca$his, Kuniva, Dirty Mouth	The County Hound 2
"You Already Know"	2015	Ca$his	Shady Capo
"WhatUpDoe"	2019	Swifty McVay, MRK SX	The Seventh Star
"Phoney"	2019	Swifty McVay, 80 Empire	Devil's Night: Dawn of the Nain Rouge (Original Motion Picture Soundtrack)
"Bad Intentions"	2020	Swifty McVay, BossmanWito	Detroit Life
"Old Heads"	2021	Swifty McVay, MRK SX, Ras Kass, Yukmouth	Long Story Longer
"No Ven"	2024	Lenwa Dura, Johnny Mendoza, Dj See All	El Hombre Tras La Rima

== Music videos ==
List of music videos, with directors, showing year released
Title	Year	Director(s)
"Rap Name"	2002	Eminem, Obie Trice
"Got Some Teeth"	2003	Eminem, Philip G. Atwell
"The Setup"	2004	Bryan Barber
"Don't Come Down"	2004	Damon Johnson
"Cry Now"	2006	Justin Francis
"Snitch"	2006	Jessy Terrero
"Jamaican Girl"	2006	Sanaa Hamri
"Anymore"	2010	Gerard Victor
"Spill My Drink"	2012	
"Spend The Day"	2012	
"Good Girls"	2015	Gerard Victor

== Notes ==
- A "Snitch" did not enter the Hot R&B/Hip-Hop Songs chart, but peaked at number 11 on the Bubbling Under R&B/Hip-Hop Singles chart, which acts as a 25-song extension to the Hot R&B/Hip-Hop Songs chart.
