= MoSS =

- Birth name: Jason Connoy
- Origin: Toronto, Ontario, Canada
- Genres: Hip hop
- Occupation: Record producer
- Years active: 1998–present

Jason Connoy, professionally known as MoSS, is a Canadian hip hop record producer from Toronto, Ontario.

Rapper Obie Trice recently released Special Reserve, a collection of previously unreleased and rare tracks produced by MoSS. He is also co-credited on Eternia's 2010 album At Last, an album which was named as a long-listed nominee for the 2011 Polaris Music Prize.

== Discography ==
- Marching to the Sound of My Own Drum (2015)

== Production credits ==
=== 1998 ===
- "My Position" 12" by Eclipse (on Conception Records - CON014)
- "My Position" (from the Conception Records compilation Walkman Rotation)

=== 1999 ===
- "Well Known Asshole" / "Gimmie My Dat Back" by Obie Trice (on No Air Play Records)

=== 2001 ===
- "Mr Trice" / "Mr. Trice" / "Dope Jobs Homeliss" by Obie Trice (on Certified Records CERT-012)
- "He's the Man" / "Dangerous" by Ranahersi (on Certified Records CERT-016)
- "Fame City" by Eclipse (on Certified Records) (test press only)

=== 2003 ===
- "8 Miles" by Obie Trice off Cheers Special Edition (on Shady Records)
- "Looking Down the Barrel" by Black Moon feat Sean Price (on Duck Down Music Inc.)
- "Da Won" / "Bump Da Gunz" by Saj Supreme (on ABB Records)

=== 2004 ===
- "Come Gurp with Me" / "Free Spirited" / "Lightning in a Bottle" / "Buckle Up" / "Spit" / "Two Bad Ants" / "Knock on Wood" / "No Cure for Sugar" / "Glued" / "God Was Watching" / "Z-Mutiny" / "UFO" / "Biggets and Bitches" / "Sleeping Pills" by Z-Man off Dope or Dog Food? (on Refill Records)
- "No Cure For Sugar" by Z-Man off Various Artists: The Building (on Hieroglyphics Imperium Recordings)

=== 2005 ===
- "One Two Y'all" by Sean Price off Monkey Barz (on Duck Down Music Inc.)
- "1,2" by Slum Village off Slum Village (on Barak Records)
- "Envious" by AZ feat Bounty Killer off A.W.O.L. (on Quiet Money Recordings / Fast Life Music)
- "Get Back" by Smif-n-Wessun feat Boot Camp Clik off Smif 'n' Wessun: Reloaded (on Duck Down Music Inc.)
- "Reckless" by the Dayton Family feat Cormega off Family Feud (on Fast Life Records)
- "Niggaz Get Knocked" by Consequence off A Tribe Called Quence (on Draft Records)
- "We Gangsta" / "Militant Soldiers" by Big Shug off Who's Hard (on Sure Shot Records)
- "Street Law" by Shaun Pen off Code of the Streets (on Fast Life Music)

=== 2006 ===
- "Kilo" by Ghostface Killah feat Raekwon off Fishscale (on Def Jam Recordings)
- "Walk Wit Me" by The Game off G.A.M.E. (on Fast Life Music)
- "I'm So Down" by Omillio Sparks off The Payback (on Koch Entertainment)
- "Our Time" by Chino XL feat Proof of D12 off Poison Pen (on Activate Entertainment)
- "Where's Brooklyn At?" by Block McCloud feat Pumpkinhead, War Bixby, Mr. Met off Spitin' Image (on Day by Day Entertainment)

=== 2007 ===
- "125 pt 1 (The Bio)" by Joell Ortiz off The Brick: Bodega Chronicles (on Koch Entertainment)
- "Oops Upside Your Head" by Sean Price feat Smif-N-Wessun off Jesus Price Supastar (on Duck Down Music Inc.)
- "Ghetto Children" by Red Café & DJ Envy off The Co-Op (on Koch Entertainment)
- "Intro" / "Street Champ" / "Hood With That" / "Warpath" / "Walk Away" / "Leg Breakers" / "Spit It Real" / "Call Me Back" / "Hear Me" / "What You Gonna Do?" / "Interlude" / "Exposed" / "Lost" / "After Me" by Big Shug off Street Champ (on Babygrande Records)
- "Broken Pieces" by La Coka Nostra feat Jeru The Damaja off Black Metal (on Uncle Howie Records)
- "Black Metal" by Ill Bill feat Q-Unique & Sick Jacken off 'Black Metal' (on Uncle Howie Records)
- "Fight Club" by Special Teamz off Stereotypez (on Duck Down Music Inc.)
- "Liquid Wordz" by Canibus feat Killah Priest & Sun off For Whom the Beat Tolls (on Mic Club Music)

=== 2008 ===
- "Kilo" (remix) by Ghostface Killah feat Raekwon & Malice (of Clipse) off GhostDeini the Great (on Def Jam Recordings)
- "The Life" by Kool G Rap off Half a Klip (on Latchkey Recordings)
- "You Know What We About" by Ransom off Street Cinema (on Babygrande Records)
- "Murdapan" / "123 Bang" / "Bring It Back" / "The Meaning of Hardcore" / "Militant Soldiers II" by Big Shug off Other Side of the Game (on Traffic Entertainment Group)
- "Up" by D-Sisive off The Book (on Urbnet Records)
- "I Shall Remain" by Sav Killz off Success is Inevitable

=== 2009 ===
- Special Reserve (album) by Obie Trice (on Moss Appeal Music)
- "Have Mercy" by Raekwon feat Beanie Sigel off Only Built 4 Cuban Linx... Pt. II (on Ice H2O Records) (uncredited)
- "Blood on the Wall" by Joe Budden off Padded Room (on Amalgam Digital)
- "Connection" by KRS-One & Buckshot off Survival Skills (on Duck Down Music Inc.)
- "Kilo Rap" by Big Noyd feat Termanology & Ghetto off Queens Chronicles (on Noyd Inc.)

=== 2010 ===
- "Keep Movin On" by Vinnie Paz feat Shara Worden off Season of the Assassin (on Enemy Soil Records)
- At Last (EP) by Eternia & Moss feat Joell Ortiz, Ras Kass, Rah Digga, Jean Grae, Tye Phoenix, Rage (on Fat Beats)
- At Last (album) by Eternia & Moss (on Fat Beats)
- "Born Survivor" by Inspectah Deck feat Cormega off Manifesto (on Urban Icon Records)

=== 2011 ===
- "Dear Lord" by Apathy feat Eternia & Diabolic off Honkey Kong (on Dirty Version Records)
- "Blood Brothaz Pt. 2" by St. Da Squad off DJ Deadeye Substance Abuse (on Brick Records)

=== 2013 ===
- "Inverted Churches" by Gore Elohim off Electric Lucifer (on Supercoven Records)
- "Paul Balof" by Ill Bill off The Grimy Awards (on Uncle Howie Records)
- "Revolution is Here" by Reks off Revolution Cocktail

=== 2015 ===
- "Unorthodox" by Supastition off Gold Standard (on Reform School Music)
- "Makes Moves, Get Money" by Big Shug off Triple OGzus (on Brick Records)

=== 2016 ===
- "Septagram" by Ill Bill off Septagram (on Uncle Howie Records)
- "Impression, Sunrise" by Reks off The Greatest X (on Brick Records)

=== 2017 ===
- Return of the Don (album) by Kool G Rap (on Clockwork Music)
- "Soviet Official" by Apathy and O.C. off Perestroika (on Dirty Version Records)
