= The Hangover (Obie Trice album) =

Studio album by Obie Trice
- Released: August 7, 2015
- Recorded: 2014–2015
- Genre: Hip-hop
- Length: 46:35
- Label: Black Market Entertainment
- Producer: Obie Trice (also exec.); Ab Floyd; Doeski Babi; Geno XO; iRock; Magnedo7; Malik Mausi; Mills; Mr. Porter

Obie Trice chronology
Bottoms Up (2012)	The Hangover (2015)	The Fifth (2019)

Singles from The Hangover
- 1. "Good Girls" Released: June 16, 2015

The Hangover is the fourth studio album by American rapper Obie Trice, released on August 7, 2015, by Black Market Entertainment. The album features guest appearances from Young Buck, Drey Skonie, Estelle and others. The album cover consists of all three of Obie Trice's first three studio album covers: Cheers, Second Round's On Me and Bottoms Up. In a 2016 interview with Mr. Wavvy, Trice revealed that this would be his final album with an alcohol-themed title. It sold 4,960 copies in its first week. It was announced on January 25, 2016, that the album had sold an estimated 7,700 copies, including from streaming services where 1,500 streams equals one album sale.

Professional ratings
Review scores
Source	Rating
The Detroit ST	52/100
iTunes music	4.5/5

== Singles ==
The song "Same Shit" was released on February 15, 2015. The lead single "Good Girl" produced by Grammy Winning Producer Magnedo, was released on June 16, 2015, as a digital download on iTunes. On July 17, 2015, Obie Trice premiered a leak from The Hangover called "Dealer" featuring Young Buck & fellow Detroit rapper Tone Tone.

== Track listing ==
The Hangover track listing
No.	Title	Writer(s)	Producer(s)	Length
1.	"Intro"	Obie Trice	Obie Trice	0:18
2.	"Chuuuurch"	Trice	iRock	5:33
3.	"Bruh Bruh"	Trice	Geno XO	3:31
4.	"Obie's Tidal"	Trice	Obie Trice	0:45
5.	"So High" (featuring Drey Skonie)	Trice; Lewis Andrew Jackson Jr.	Magnedo7	4:10
6.	"Good Girls"	Trice	Magnedo7	3:07
7.	"Dealer" (featuring Tone Tone and Young Buck)	Trice; Antonio Henderson; David Darnell Brown	Mills	4:04
8.	"GMA (The Speech)"	Trice	Mr. Porter	3:53
9.	"So Long" (featuring Gwenation)	Trice; Gwenation Barnes	iRock	3:46
10.	"P8tience" (featuring P8tience)	Trice; Brian Barnes	iRock	3:28
11.	"Same Shit" (featuring Young Zeether)	Trice; Makesonji Zeether Dieudonne	Doeski Babi	4:11
12.	"Detroit State of Mind" (featuring J-Nutty)	Trice; Jonathan E. Walker	Gene XO	4:06
13.	"Bang"	Trice	Mills	3:05
14.	"I'm Home" (featuring Estelle)	Trice; Estelle Fanta Swaray	Malik Mausi	4:38
Total length:				46:35
