= Station Zero =

American animated television series

- The main cast of Station Zero.
- Genre: Adult animation Comedy; Musical
- Created by: Tramp Daly
- Based on: A View From Da' Unda'Ground by Tramp Daly
- Written by: Jason Centeno; Don "Lava" Murphy; Tramp Daly; Carlito Rodriguez; Quanzilla
- Directed by: Michael Ferraro
- Voices of: Riggs Morales; Carlito Rodriguez; Quanzilla; Scratch
- Theme music composer: Randall Lawrence
- Opening theme: "We're On Station Zero"
- Ending theme: "Station Zero Freestyle Rap"
- Composer: Barry S. Bookhard
- Country of origin: United States
- Original languages: English; Spanish
- No. of seasons: 1
- No. of episodes: 20

Production
- Executive producers: Tramp Daly; Abby Terkuhle
- Producers: Janine Cirincione; Jody Milano Vanderputten; Carlito Rodriguez; Tramp Daly
- Animator: Possible Worlds
- Editor: Molly McEwan
- Running time: 22 minutes
- Production companies: Possible Worlds; C-Traze Studios; Upfront Entertainment; MTV Animation

Original release
- Network: MTV
- Release: March 8 – April 6, 1999

Station Zero is an American daily adult animated/live-action hybrid series that aired on MTV for one season in early 1999, airing Monday through Friday at 6:30 pm. The show followed a group of four Bronx teenagers who ran a fictional public-access television show called Live from the Bronx, where they watched hip hop videos and critiqued them in a similar manner as that of Beavis and Butt-Head. It was based on A View From Da' Unda'Ground, a comic strip from the same team which ran in The Source from 1991 to 1994.

== Characters ==
- Karaz (voiced by Riggs Morales): An 18-year-old African-American teenager, who is very shy and timid, He's the pop-loving “hustler/politician”. He always caused the blackout to the studio. He is really get into the mainstream hip-hop such as Diddy and Jay-Z. His catchphrase is "Don't talk about my mom, Man."
- Chino (voiced by Carlito Rodriguez): A 17-year-old Latino teenager, who is the MC and the hip-hop purist and re-represents the underground such as Rakim and KRS-One. His catchphrase is "Oh man!", "Wha-what!", "Aw, come on, man!".
- Scooter (voiced by Quanzilla): A 14-year-old African-American cameraman, who is Karaz's best friend and the self-proclaimed director and producer of the show. He's the smartest and intelligent kid in the Bronx. His catchphrase is "We're on the air here."
- DJ Tech (Sound provided by Scratch of The Roots) An 18-year-old silent DJ who speaks with his cuts using the turntables. As the theme song says that he's the man who only speak with his hands.
- The Man: He is the unseen character. His signature scare chord plays after the teenagers says "The Man".

== Episodes ==
No.	Title	Original release date	Prod. code
1	"Pilot"	March 8, 1999	101
Featured videos: "The Rain (Supa Dupa Fly)", "Jump Around", "Tha Crossroads", "I'll Never Break Your Heart", "Woo Hah!! Got You All in Check (Remix)"
2	"Balls-O-Meter"	March 9, 1999	102
The boys are watching "Blue Angels" video. Karaz is doing the spoken word while the boys watches the "On & On" video. During the "In My Bed (Remix)" video, Chino is annoyed by Da Brat. DJ Tech plays the Aerosmith's 1987 song before Karaz tells him that the song is not cool. In the end, Scooter breaks the camera after they disrespect his grandma. Featured videos: "Blue Angels", "On & On", "In My Bed (So So Def Remix)", "Summertime"
3	"Uptown, Baby"	March 10, 1999	103
The boys are doing the "Uptown, Baby!" freestyle rap. Chino, Karaz, DJ Tech and Scooter watches Mya's 1998 video called "It's All About Me". Chino thinks that Mya was Chino's wife. Karaz accidentally knocks out the power. DJ Tech plays Redman's 1997 song "Whateva Man" while Scooter fix the power. They watches Ginuwine's video "Same Ol' G" and Karaz sings the song off-key. Scooter is very angry when he tells the boys that The Man is not going to like this video. Chino swears at Scooter, causing the lights to go dim. The boys are having an interview with Method Man. Featured videos: "Déjà Vu (Uptown Baby)", "It's All About Me", "Same Ol' G", "I'll Be There for You/You're All I Need to Get By"
4	"Old-School Thursday"	March 11, 1999	104
The boys watches 2 break dancing music videos, Karaz is moved by the video.
5	"Episode 5"	March 12, 1999	105
6	"Episode 6"	March 15, 1999	106
7	"Episode 7"	March 16, 1999	107
8	"Episode 8"	March 17, 1999	108
9	"Episode 9"	March 18, 1999	109
10	"Episode 10"	March 22, 1999	110
11	"Episode 11"	March 23, 1999	111
12	"Episode 12"	March 24, 1999	112
Karaz is angry and left the show until Angie Martinez comes during the Ladies' Night Show. ''Featured videos: "Shoop", "Trippin'", "Rapture", "Crush On You", "Not Tonight (Ladies Night Remix)"
13	"Episode 13"	March 25, 1999	113
14	"Episode 14"	March 26, 1999	114
15	"Episode 15"	March 29, 1999	115
16	"Episode 16"	March 30, 1999	116
17	"Episode 17"	March 31, 1999	117
18	"Episode 18"	April 1, 1999	118
19	"Episode 19"	April 5, 1999	119
20	"Episode 20"	April 6, 1999	120

== Broadcast ==
In the United Kingdom, the show aired on MTV Base in 1999, being among the first shows to air on the newly created network.

== Reception ==
The show was eventually canceled after only one season of twenty episodes. While it was primarily canceled for its lower ratings, it's speculated that it was because the producers and writers knew of this show's quick demise because of low ratings, and the animated cast walks off into the sunset in the finale.
