= Eternia (disambiguation) =

Eternia may refer to:

- Eternia (rapper), a Canadian female rapper
- Tales of Eternia, a role-playing video game, renamed to Tales of Destiny II in North America
- The fantasy planet that serves as main setting to the Masters of the Universe
- The fantasy continent in Bravely Default and its sequels
