= Conceit (disambiguation) =

A conceit is an extended metaphor, especially in literature.

Conceit may also refer to:

- Conceit (novel) (2007), by Mary Novik
- Conceit (rapper) (fl. c. 2007), American musician
- Conceit (film), a 1921 American silent drama film
- Excessive self-esteem, hubris

== See also ==
- Central conceit, a literary work's inherent assumption, toward which its audience are intended to suspend disbelief
