= Conceited =

Conceited may refer to:

- Conceited (rapper)
- "Conceited" (song), a 2022 rap song by Flo Milli
- "Conceited (There's Something About Remy)", a 2005 single by Remy Ma
- Conceited, a 1987 album by Kyper

== See also ==
- Conceit (disambiguation)
