= Cirincione =

Cirincione is a surname. Notable people with the surname include:

- Janine Cirincione (born 1961), American curator and multimedia artist
- Joseph Cirincione (born 1949), American national security analyst and author
