= Bottoms Up (Obie Trice album) =

Studio album by Obie Trice
- Released: April 3, 2012
- Recorded: 2006–12
- Genres: Hardcore hip-hop; Midwest hip-hop
- Length: 62:39
- Label: Black Market Entertainment
- Producers: Obie Trice (exec.); Coree Benton; Dr. Dre; Eminem; Geno XO; K & Square; Lucas Rezza; Luis Resto; NoSpeakerz; Phonix Beats; Statik Selektah; Witt

Obie Trice chronology
Special Reserve (2009)	Bottoms Up (2012)	The Hangover (2015)

Singles from Bottoms Up
- 1. "Battle Cry" Released: August 23, 2011; 2. "Spend the Day" Released: March 6, 2012; 3. "Spill My Drink" Released: August 21, 2012

Professional ratings
Review scores
Source	Rating
Allmusic	3.5/5 stars
HipHopDX	3.5/5 stars
XXL	4/5 stars

Bottoms Up is the third studio album by American rapper Obie Trice. It was released on April 3, 2012, by Black Market Entertainment. The album entering the charts at number 113, with 5,000 physical albums sold in the first week. The album is his first effort since Second Round's on Me in 2006 and features production from Dr. Dre and Eminem.

== Background ==
The title of the album, Bottoms Up, was chosen as Obie Trice was keen to keep the alcohol-related theme for his album titles. He had begun working on the album while in the process of releasing his second album, Second Round's on Me. As of 21 May 2007, Obie Trice told MTV that he was at the time "a few songs deep", and had by that point collaborated with just Daz Dillinger. He also stated that he'd like to get work done with Eminem, 50 Cent, Slaughterhouse, Young Buck, Akon, Cashis, Jazze Pha, and Devin the Dude. On the topic of collaborating, Obie Trice also explained to MTV, "I don't really know a lot of artists—I'm in Detroit. It's not Atlanta, where everybody is everywhere, or L.A. or somewhere like that. I actually think it's time for me to start branching off and start connecting with cats. Getting my collaboration on and working with some hot producers—unknown and known—and just make them joints that feel good and that are radio. I just want to make that transition."

But in July, XXL displayed in an Obie Trice interview that Obie said he would not to compromise his integrity. He also said that he felt he was near to being finished, and has worked with producers such as Greenville South Carolina's Propane the Great Now known as Propain and the 70s (who did his single "Detroit Summer"), Detroit's Square Biz, and Six - all of which he stated as being "unknown producers, but the shit is fire."

Obie had also mentioned in another interview that he does have beats from Dr. Dre, which he received during Second Round's on Me, but decided to keep them for Bottoms Up. He has also stated at various times that he'd like to release the album in the summer of 2008, and further elaborated on this thought by saying, "I would like to have a summertime album because both of my [previous] albums were in the winter [or] fall. I think these tracks I'm picking are more fun, summer type of joints. I [don't] want to wait so long to put out an album. It took three years to put out Second Round's on Me [after] Cheers. I think that's too long."

In June 2008, Obie Trice departed from Shady Records. In September 2008 in an interview with Detroit's FM98 WJLB, Obie said he expected the album would be released in February 2009, under his new label Black Market Ent. On May 4, 2010 Obie Trice confirmed Eminem is on the album and he still remains friends with him. In an interview with XXL on August 24, 2011, Trice elaborated on Eminem's contributions on the album, revealing that he would appear on two songs, one of which is called "No Turning Back", the other called 'Friends With Enemies'.

== Singles ==
The album's lead single "Battle Cry", was released on August 23, 2011. The song features guest vocals from Adrian Rezza and was produced by Lucas Rezza. The album's second single "Spend the Day" featuring Drey Skonie, was released on iTunes on March 6, 2012. The album's third single "Spill My Drink", was released on August 21, 2012, as digital download on iTunes.

== Track listing ==
The track listing was confirmed by Amazon.com.

No.	Title	Writer(s)	Producer	Length
1.	"Bottoms Up / Intro"	Obie Trice; Andre Young	Dr. Dre	3:10
2.	"Going No Where"	Trice; Marshall Mathers; Luis Resto	Eminem; Resto^{[a]}	3:45
3.	"Dear Lord"	Trice	K & Square	3:44
4.	"I Pretend"	Trice	Coree Benton	5:04
5.	"Richard" (featuring Eminem)	Trice; Mathers	Statik Selektah	3:50
6.	"BME Up"	Trice	Phonix Beats	3:28
7.	"Battle Cry" (featuring Adrian Rezza)	Trice; Adrian Rezza	Lucas Rezza	4:14
8.	"Secrets"	Trice	K & Square	3:45
9.	"Spill My Drink"	Trice	NoSpeakerz	4:07
10.	"Spend the Day" (featuring Drey Skonie)	Trice; Lewis Jackson	NoSpeakerz	3:46
11.	"Petty"	Trice	NoSpeakerz	3:25
12.	"My Time"	Trice	Geno XO	3:51
13.	"Ups and Downs"	Trice	K & Square	4:23
14.	"Hell Yea"	Trice	NoSpeakerz	3:23
15.	"Crazy" (featuring MC Breed)	Trice; Eric Breed	Witt	4:23
16.	"LeBron On" (Bonus Track)	Trice	NoSpeakerz	4:14
Total length:				62:39

Notes

- ^{^[a]} signifies an additional producer.

== Charts ==
Chart (2012)	Peak position
US Billboard 200	113
US R&B/Hip-Hop Albums (Billboard)	18
US Rap Albums (Billboard)	15
US Independent Albums (Billboard)	14
