= Scratch (musician) =

- Born: Kyle Jones; Camden, New Jersey, U.S.
- Genres: Hip hop
- Occupations: Beatboxer, human turntablist
- Instruments: Beatboxing; vocal scratching; loop pedals

Kyle Jones (born in Camden, New Jersey), better known as Scratch, is an American hip hop musician who specializes in beatboxing and vocal scratch sounds. He is best known as a former member of the band the Roots. He is well known in the hip hop and beatbox community for his ability to simulate the music of a hip hop turntablist using only his voice and loop machines.

== History ==
Originally a member of Philadelphia-based rap group Schoolz of Thought, he joined the Roots in 1996.

Scratch released his debut solo album The Embodiment of Instrumentation in 2002 on the Ropeadope record label. It featured the Roots, Dice Raw, Calente from the PBPs, E.S.T of Three Times Dope, Cyph Born of Aphillyation, Bilal, Jill Scott, Malik B and M.A.R.S. Co-Op.

In 2004, Scratch contributed to Zap Mama's Ancestry in Progress on the track "Wadidyusay?".

Scratch is a member of Dino 5, who realized their first album Baby Loves Hip Hop in 2008. Scratch plays Teo, a Pterodactyl.

In 2009, he released an album titled Loss 4 Wordz, featuring artists such as Kanye West, Musiq, Damon Albarn, and Peedi-Peedi. He also appeared on British rapper GoldieLocks's EP titled Goldie's Oldies.

== Discography ==
=== Solo ===
==== Studio albums ====
Title	Album details
The Embodiment of Instrumentation	Released: June 4, 2002; Label: Ropeadope
Loss 4 Wordz	Released: May 26, 2009; Label: Gold Dust

==== Singles ====
Title	Year	Album
"Let's Go" (feat. Peedi Crakk)	2009	Loss 4 Wordz

=== Dino 5 ===
- Baby Loves Hip Hop (2008)

=== Other appearances ===
- The Roots – Illadelph Halflife (1996)
- Pink – Missundaztood (2001)
- Christian McBride – Live at Tonic (2006)
- Something Sally – Turn On the Radio (Sweet In Stereo) (EP, 2008)

== Filmography ==
=== Film ===
Year	Title	Role	Notes
2002	Breath Control: The History of the Human Beat Box	Himself	

=== Television ===
Year	Title	Role	Notes
1999	Station Zero	DJ Tech	20 episodes
