= The Villain (album) =

Studio album by Trick Trick
- Released: November 11, 2008
- Recorded: 2007–08
- Genre: Midwest hip-hop; gangsta rap
- Length: 1:05:23
- Label: WonderBoy; Time; Koch
- Producer: Trick Trick (also exec.); Eminem; Dr. Dre; Jeff Bass; Lil' Jon; Luis Resto

Trick Trick chronology
The People vs. (2005)	The Villain (2008)

Singles from The Villain
- 1. "Let's Work" Released: 2008; 2. "Let It Fly" Released: 2008; 3. "Who Want It" Released: 2008

Professional ratings
Review scores
Source	Rating
HipHopDX	3.5/5
RapReviews	4/10
Robert Christgau	(dud)

The Villain is the second solo studio album by American rapper Trick Trick. The record features guest appearances by the likes of Big Sweetz, C.A.C, Diezel, Eminem, Esham, Fatt Father, Goon Sqwad, Guilty Simpson, Ice Cube, Kid Rock, Marv Won, Paradime, Royce Da 5'9", Throatslash, and his Mathis Family Choir group.

== Production and promotion ==
The eighteen track LP was released on November 11, 2008, under the record labels of WonderBoy Entertainment, Time Entertainment LLC and Koch Records. Audio production on the album was handled by Eminem, Dr. Dre, Lil' Jon, and Trick Trick himself.

Working on The Villain, Trick Trick also worked with Fatt Father on his self-titled debut solo album via Time Ent. During 2008, Fatts released two mixtapes You Are The Father! and Christmas With Fatt Father promoting both projects.

The first single off the album was "Let It Fly" featured vocals from Ice Cube, with audio production being handled by Lil' Jon.

== Controversy ==
Within days of release, controversy surrounded this album, revolving especially around anti-homosexual subject matter. AllHipHop.com article published on November 11, 2008, pointed out some of the objectionable lyrics on the album, such as "...He's a fucking faggot so I'm lettin' off my AK/Bust 'em in his forehead/He ain't worth lettin' live/A man and man shouldn’t raise another man's kids!" In discussing the album, Trick Trick remarks that "Homosexuals are probably not going to like this album. But it's okay, I don't want their faggot money any goddamn way. It's just that every time that you turn on the TV, that sissy shit is on, and they act like it's fucking okay...and I address that issue. I address it hard as hell".

In response to this attack on the gay community, AllHipHop posted an article on November 13 where various gay and lesbian hip-hop musicians responded in a variety of different ways.

== Track listing ==
No.	Title	Producer(s)	Length
1.	"The Villain" (Intro)		0:46
2.	"Trick Trick"	Trick Trick	3:39
3.	"U Can Get Fucked Up" (featuring Goon Sqwad)	Trick Trick	3:51
4.	"Who Want It" (featuring Eminem)	Eminem; Luis Resto	4:11
5.	"Can't Fuck Wit My City" (featuring MarvWon & Guilty Simpson)	Trick Trick	3:33
6.	"Somethin' 4 Da Hataz" (featuring Fatts, Diezel & Paradime)	Trick Trick	4:18
7.	"Work" (Skit)		0:30
8.	"Let's Work!!!"	Trick Trick	4:36
9.	"Hold On"	Dr. Dre	4:09
10.	"Let It Fly" (featuring Ice Cube)	Lil' Jon	4:13
11.	"All Around The World" (featuring Royce Da 5'9")	Trick Trick	3:49
12.	"2getha 4 Eva!!!" (featuring Esham, Kid Rock & Proof)	Trick Trick	3:23
13.	"Follow Me"	Eminem; Luis Resto	4:36
14.	"A MF Pimp" (featuring Big Sweetz)	Trick Trick	5:06
15.	"Get It Crackin'"	Trick Trick	4:30
16.	"Crazy" (featuring Throatslash)	Eminem; Jeff Bass	5:40
17.	"You Told Me" (featuring C.A.)	Trick Trick	5:56
18.	"Let It Go" (featuring The Mathis Family Choir)	Trick Trick	5:20
Total length:			1:05:23

== Personnel ==
- Aaron Julson – bass
- Andre Young – producer
- Byron Simpson – rap vocals
- Chris Mathis – executive producer, mixing, producer, rap vocals
- DeShaun Holton – rap vocals
- Esham Smith – rap vocals
- Fred Beauregard – rap vocals
- Jeff Bass – bass
- Jonathan Smith – producer, back vocals
- Kameel Mathis – rap vocals
- Marshall Mathers – producer, rap vocals
- Marvin O'Neil – rap vocals
- O'Shea Jackson – rap vocals
- Robert Ritchie – rap vocals
- Ryan Montgomery – rap vocals
- Shabazz Ford – rap vocals
- T-Money Green – bass
