= Z-Man (rapper) =

American underground rapper

Z-Man (given name Zamon) is an underground rapper and painter from the San Francisco Bay Area. He has released many full-length studio albums, several of which were self-recorded and released, and he has worked with numerous underground Bay Area rap legends.

He is a frequent collaborator with other artists in the Gurp City collective, composed of Sacred Hoop, Grand Invincible, G-Pek, Conceit, TOPR, MC Oroville and Bay Area legend Eddie Def. He has also worked with Hieroglyphics Crew, Disflex.6, and Refill Records.

Z-Man is also a painter with a broad body of acrylic-on-canvas paintings that portray cartoon-style hybrid creatures in vibrant, bold color schemes that often have thematic references to black culture. He paints all of his album covers and T-shirt designs, and has painted and drawn many album covers for other hip hop artists.

== Music career ==
Z-Man's first album appearance was in 1996, with his group 99th Demention, which consisted of Z, King Maz, Young Slim, Rated R, Rev Cope and P.B.F.-1. The group released one album and was compared to The Pharcyde early on.

In 2003 and 2004 he released two solo albums produced by the Hieroglyphics label, Dope or Dog Food? and Anti-Nerd. In 2008 his group One Block Radius signed with Mercury/Island/Def Jam Records. In 2008, he signed as to San Francisco label Machete Vox Records, working on an album titled Six Pack Of Dynamite, produced by BOAC and Dnae Beats.

Along with his many collaborations he has also worked with Bay Area producer G-Pek and released two albums, 2008's Don't Forget to Brag and 2012's In Case You Forgot.

== Discography ==
- A Verse or Two
- 4 Hours of Sleep
- Dope or Dog Food? (2003)
- Anti Nerd (2004)
- Don't Forget to Brag (2005)
- In Case You Forget (2012)
- The Vegetable and the Ferret (2012, with White Mic)
- California Brainwashed (2013)
