= No Days Off =

Mixtape by the Alchemist
- Released: September 26, 2006
- Genre: Hip-hop
- Length: 45:53
- Label: ALC
- Producer: The Alchemist; Evidence; Sebb

The Alchemist chronology
1st Infantry (2004)	No Days Off (2006)	The Chemistry Files (2006)

Professional ratings
Review scores
Source	Rating
AllMusic	3.5/5 stars
RapReviews	7.5/10

No Days Off is a fourth mixtape album by American rapper and record producer the Alchemist. It was released on September 26, 2006, via ALC Records. The majority of production was handled by the Alchemist, except for two tracks, produced by Evidence and DJ Sebb. It features guest appearances from Evidence, Prodigy, 40 Glocc, Agallah, Defari, Joe Scudda, Kokane, Mitchy Slick, Obie Trice, Ras Kass, Tha Dogg Pound, Un Pacino and Xzibit.

The bulk of the songs have guest MCs over his beats, though the Alchemist raps on five of the tracks.

== Track listing ==
No.	Title	Producer(s)	Length
1.	"No Days Off (Intro)"	The Alchemist	0:44
2.	"Flashlight" (with 40 Glocc and Ras Kass)	The Alchemist	4:59
3.	"Legends" (performed by Prodigy)	The Alchemist	3:47
4.	"Making Your Money" (performed by Mitchy Slick and Xzibit)	The Alchemist	3:55
5.	"Hot & Cold" (performed by Evidence featuring The Alchemist)	Evidence	4:31
6.	"On the Rise" (performed by Tha Dogg Pound)	The Alchemist	3:19
7.	"You Got It" (performed by Prodigy)	The Alchemist	3:51
8.	"Now That I'm On (Interlude)"	The Alchemist	0:58
9.	"It's Gon' Pop" (with Evidence and Joe Scudda)	The Alchemist	3:04
10.	"Divine Intervention" (performed by Obie Trice)	The Alchemist	3:05
11.	"I Betcha" (performed by Prodigy featuring Kokane)	The Alchemist	2:41
12.	"Ride Out" (performed by Agallah featuring The Alchemist)	The Alchemist	3:01
13.	"Words from Un" (performed by Un Pacino)	The Alchemist	3:03
14.	"Make My Own" (performed by Defari featuring Evidence)	The Alchemist	3:05
15.	"Do My 1, 2"	DJ Sebb	1:50
Total length:			45:53

== Personnel ==
- Alan "The Alchemist" Maman – vocals (tracks: 2, 5, 9, 12, 15), producer (tracks: 1–4, 6–14), mixing
- Lawrence Carl Demetrious "40 Glocc" White – vocals (track 2)
- John "Ras Kass" Austin – vocals (track 2)
- Albert "Prodigy" Johnson – vocals (tracks: 3, 7, 11)
- Charles "Mitchy Slick" Mitchell – vocals (track 4)
- Alvin "Xzibit" Joiner – vocals (track 4)
- Michael "Evidence" Perretta – vocals (tracks: 5, 9, 14), producer (track 5)
- Tha Dogg Pound – vocals (track 6)
- Joseph "Joe Scudda" Griffen – vocals (track 9)
- Obie Trice III – vocals (track 10)
- Jerry Buddy "Kokane" Long Jr. – vocals (track 11)
- Angel "8-Off" Aguilar – vocals (track 12)
- Jamal "Un Pacino" Brayboy-Brady – vocals (track 13)
- Duane A. "Defari" Johnson Jr. – vocals (track 14)
- Sébastien "DJ Sebb" Vuignier – producer (track 15)
