= Welcome 2 Detroit (song) =

2005 song by Trick Trick and Eminem

Single by Trick Trick featuring Eminem

from the album The People vs.
- Released: October 11, 2005
- Recorded: June 2003
- Studio: Marshall's House; Sound 45; Batcave
- Genre: Hardcore hip hop; gangsta rap
- Length: 4:46
- Label: Motown
- Songwriters: Christian Mathis; Marshall Mathers; Luis Resto
- Producers: Eminem; Luis Resto (add.)

Trick Trick singles chronology
"Booty Bounce" (1997)	"Welcome 2 Detroit" (2005)	"Let's Go to War" (2005)

Eminem singles chronology
"Ass Like That" (2005)	"Welcome 2 Detroit" (2005)	"When I'm Gone" (2005)

Music video
- "Welcome 2 Detroit" on YouTube

"Welcome 2 Detroit" is a song by American rappers Trick Trick and Eminem. It was released on November 8, 2005, via Motown/Universal Music Group as the lead single from Trick Trick's debut solo studio album The People vs. written by Trick Trick, Eminem and Luis Resto, it was recorded at Em's home recording studio, at 54 Sound Studios, and at Batcave. Production was handled by Eminem with additional production from Resto. The single peaked at number 100 on the Billboard Hot 100.

== Music video ==
The music video for "Welcome 2 Detroit" is set in Detroit at The Shelter. It was directed by Davy Duhamel and produced by Jacquie Frisco. It also features cameo appearances by Proof and the Goon Sqwad.

== Track listing ==
No.	Title	Writer(s)	Producer(s)	Length
1.	"Welcome 2 Detroit (Radio Edit)" (featuring Eminem)	Christian Mathis; Marshall Mathers; Luis Resto	Eminem; Luis Resto^{[a]}	3:47
2.	"Welcome 2 Detroit (Album Version)" (featuring Eminem)	Mathis; Mathers; Resto	Eminem; Resto^{[a]}	4:45
3.	"Attitude Adjustment" (featuring Jazze Pha)	Mathis; Phalon Alexander	Jazze Pha	5:06
4.	"Welcome 2 Detroit (Video)" (featuring Eminem)		Jacquie Frisco	4:45
Total length:				12:28

Notes

- ^{^[a]} signifies an additional producer.

== Personnel ==
- Christian Anthony Mathis – songwriter, vocals
- Marshall Bruce Mathers III – songwriter & vocals (tracks: 1, 2, 4), engineering & producer (tracks: 1, 2)
- Luis Edgardo Resto – songwriter & additional producer (tracks: 1, 2)
- Phalon Alexander – vocals & producer (track 3)
- Leslie Brathwaite – mixing (track 3)
- Mike Strange – recording (track 4)
- Tony Campana – recording (track 4)
- Davy Duhamel – director (track 4)
- Jacquie Frisco – producer (track 4)
- Kyle Goen – art direction
- Matt Dorfman – design
- John Richard – photography

== Charts ==
Chart (2005–06)	Peak position
Austria (Ö3 Austria Top 40)	24
ERROR in "CIS": Invalid position: 312. Expected number 1–200 or dash (–).
Finland (Suomen virallinen lista)	12
Germany (GfK)	20
US Billboard Hot 100	100
US Rhythmic Airplay (Billboard)	36

== Certifications ==
Region	Certification	Certified units/sales
United States (RIAA)	Gold	500,000^{‡}
^{‡} Sales+streaming figures based on certification alone.

== Release history ==
Release dates and formats for "Welcome 2 Detroit"
Region	Date	Format	Label(s)	Ref.
United States	November 8, 2005	Mainstream airplay	Lava	
