= The Grimy Awards =

Studio album by Ill Bill
- Released: February 26, 2013
- Recorded: 2012
- Studio: Found Sound Studios (Philadelphia); Busy B Studios (North Carolina); Kill Devil Hills (North Carolina); HeadQcourterz Studios (New York)
- Genre: Hip-hop
- Length: 58:17
- Label: Uncle Howie; Fat Beats
- Producer: Uncle Howie (also exec.); Ayatollah; C-Lance; DJ Muggs; DJ Premier; DJ Skizz; El-P; Ill Bill; Junior Makhno; Large Professor; MoSS; Pete Rock; Psycho Les; Stu Bangas

Ill Bill chronology
Heavy Metal Kings (2011)	The Grimy Awards (2013)	Septagram (2016)

Professional ratings
Review scores
Source	Rating
AllMusic	3.5/5 stars
Exclaim!	4/10
HipHopDX	3.5/5
RapReviews	7.5/10

The Grimy Awards is the third studio album by American rapper Ill Bill. It was released on February 26, 2013, by Uncle Howie Records and Fat Beats Records. Recording sessions took place at Found Sound Studios in Philadelphia, at Busy B Studios and at Kill Devil Hills in North Carolina, and at HeadQcourterz Studios in New York. Production was handled by Junior Makhno, MoSS, Pete Rock, Psycho Les, DJ Skizz, Large Professor, Ayatollah, El-P, DJ Muggs, C-Lance, DJ Premier, and Ill Bill himself. It features guest appearances from A-Trak, Cormega, El-P, H.R., Jedi Mind Tricks, Lil' Fame, Meyhem Lauren, O.C., Q-Unique, Shabazz the Disciple and Tia Thomas.

== Track listing ==
No.	Title	Producer(s)	Length
1.	"What Does it All Mean?"	Ill Bill	1:48
2.	"Paul Baloff"	MoSS	3:03
3.	"I Don't Know How Long It's Gonna Last" (Skit)	Uncle Howie	0:34
4.	"Acceptance Speech" (featuring A-Trak)	Junior Makhno	3:54
5.	"Truth"	Pete Rock	3:59
6.	"Exploding Octopus"	Ill Bill	3:51
7.	"Forty Deuce Hebrew" (featuring H.R.)	Ill Bill	4:52
8.	"How to Survive the Apocalypse"	Psycho Les	3:16
9.	"Vio-Lence" (featuring Shabazz the Disciple and Lil' Fame)	DJ Skizz	3:46
10.	"Acid Reflux"	Large Professor	3:23
11.	"L'Amour East" (featuring Meyhem Lauren and Q-Unique)	Ayatollah	4:04
12.	"Power" (featuring O.C. and Cormega)	DJ Muggs	3:19
13.	"When I Die (Remix)" (featuring Tia Thomas)	Pete Rock	4:22
14.	"Severed Heads of State" (featuring El-P)	El-P	3:06
15.	"120% Darkside Justice" (featuring Jedi Mind Tricks)	C-Lance	3:29
16.	"Canarsie High"	Large Professor	3:13
17.	"World Premier"	DJ Premier	4:19

Deluxe Edition bonus tracks
No.	Title	Producer(s)	Length
18.	"Acid Reflux (Stu Bangas Remix)"	Stu Bangas	2:59
Total length:			58:17

== Charts ==
Chart (2013)	Peak position
US Top R&B/Hip-Hop Albums (Billboard)	75
US Heatseekers Albums (Billboard)	39
