= At Last (Eternia and MoSS album) =

Studio album by Eternia & MoSS
- Released: June 29, 2010
- Genre: Canadian hip hop
- Length: 46:10
- Label: Fat Beats
- Producer: MoSS

Eternia chronology
It's Called Life (2005)	At Last (2010)	Free (2021)

Professional ratings
Review scores
Source	Rating
HipHopDX	3.5/5
RapReviews	6.5/10

At Last is the second studio album by Canadian rapper Eternia. Originally announced to be released on June 15, 2010, it was released on June 29, 2010, through Fat Beats Records. Production was entirely handled by MoSS. It features guest appearances from Jessica Kaya, Joell Ortiz, Maestro Fresh Wes, Rah Digga, Reef the Lost Cauze, Termanology, The Lady of Rage and Tona.

The full-length album was preceded by an eponymous extended play, released on June 8, 2010, via Fat Beats. The eight-track At Last EP was composed of two lead singles from the full-length: "The BBQ" and "It's Funny", in addition to "The BBQ" remix featuring Jean Grae and Tiye Phoenix, along with the "It's Funny" remix featuring Ras Kass.

The album received a Juno Award for Rap Recording of the Year nomination at the Juno Awards of 2011 and was long-listed for the 2011 Polaris Music Prize, while the collaboration between Eternia and MoSS was nominated for an Indie Award for Best Urban Artist/Group Or Duo Of The Year at the 2011 Jim Beam® Indie Awards. DJ Premier ranked the album at No. 17 on his top 25 albums of 2010 during his LiveFromHQ show on Hip Hop Nation/Sirius Satellite Radio. At Last also received favourable reviews from music critics with HipHopDX, DJBooth.net and PotholesInMyBlog.com giving the album a 3.5 out of 5 and Urb upped the ante by giving the album a rating of 4 out of 5.

The instrumental version of the album was released on July 5, 2011.

== Track listing ==
=== At Last LP track listing ===
At Last LP (FB5129)
No.	Title	Writer(s)	Length
1.	"Intro"	Jason Connoy	0:35
2.	"Any Man"	Silk Kaya; Connoy; J. Gahunia	3:33
3.	"32 Bars"	S. Kaya; Connoy	2:00
4.	"It's Funny" (featuring Joell Ortiz)	S. Kaya; Connoy; Gahunia; John R. Austin	3:52
5.	"The BBQ" (featuring Rah Digga and The Lady of Rage)	S. Kaya; Rashia Fisher; Robin Allen; Connoy	3:09
6.	"Pass That"	S. Kaya; Connoy	3:44
7.	"To the Past"	S. Kaya; Connoy	0:43
8.	"The Half"	S. Kaya; Connoy	3:34
9.	"Played Out" (featuring Jessica Kaya)	S. Kaya; Jessica Kaya; Connoy	4:42
10.	"To the Future"	S. Kaya; Connoy	2:01
11.	"Dear Mr. Bacardi"	S. Kaya; Connoy	4:11
12.	"At Last" (featuring Reef the Lost Cauze and Termanology)	S. Kaya; Sharif Lacey; Daniel Carrillo; Connoy; S. Law	3:16
13.	"Day in the Life" (featuring Tona and Maestro Fresh Wes)	S. Kaya; Richmond Nantwi; Wesley Williams; Connoy; Gahunia	4:20
14.	"Catch Me"	S. Kaya; Connoy	2:59
15.	"Goodbye"	S. Kaya; Connoy	3:31
Total length:			46:10

=== At Last EP track listing ===
At Last EP (FB5131)
No.	Title	Writer(s)	Length
1.	"The BBQ" (featuring Rah Digga and The Lady of Rage)	S. Kaya; Fisher; Allen; Connoy	3:12
2.	"The BBQ (Remix)" (featuring Tiye Phoenix and Jean Grae)	S. Kaya; J. Thomas; Tsidi Ibrahim; Connoy	3:42
3.	"It's Funny" (featuring Joell Ortiz)	S. Kaya; Joell Ortiz; Connoy; Gahunia	3:53
4.	"It's Funny (Remix)" (featuring Ras Kass)	S. Kaya; Austin; Connoy; Gahunia	2:49
5.	"The BBQ (Instrumental)"	Connoy	3:42
6.	"The BBQ (Accapella)"	S. Kaya; Fisher; Allen	2:49
7.	"The BBQ (Extended Mix)" (featuring Rah Digga, The Lady of Rage, Tiye Phoenix and Jean Grae)	S. Kaya; Fisher; Allen; Thomas; Ibrahim; Connoy	4:53
8.	"The BBQ (Extended Mix - Clean)" (featuring Rah Digga, The Lady of Rage, Tiye Phoenix and Jean Grae)	S. Kaya; Fisher; Allen; Thomas; Ibrahim; Connoy	4:53

== Personnel ==
- Silk "Eternia" Kaya – vocals, executive producer
- Jason "MoSS" Connoy – producer, executive producer
- Joell Ortiz – featured artist (track 4)
- Rashia "Rah Digga" Fisher – featured artist (track 5)
- Robin "The Lady of Rage" Allen – featured artist (track 5)
- Jessica Kaya – featured artist (track 9)
- Sharif "Reef the Lost Cauze" Lacey – featured artist (track 12), additional vocals (track 3)
- Daniel "Termanology" Carrillo – featured artist (track 12)
- Richmond "Tona" Nantwi – featured artist (track 13)
- Wesley "Maestro Fresh Wes" Williams – featured artist (track 13)
- Lil Jaz – cuts (tracks: 2, 4, 13)
- DJ Law – cuts (track 12)
- Robert "G Koop" Mandell – additional instrumentation (tracks: 2, 5, 6, 8–10, 14)
- Alia O'Brien – additional instrumentation (track 11)
- Andrew "ProLogic" Franklin – mixing, mastering
- Frank "DJ Concept" DeMaria – art direction, design
- Angie Choi – photography
- Joseph Abajian – executive producer
- Kyle Lundie – executive producer
