= Trick Trick =

American rapper

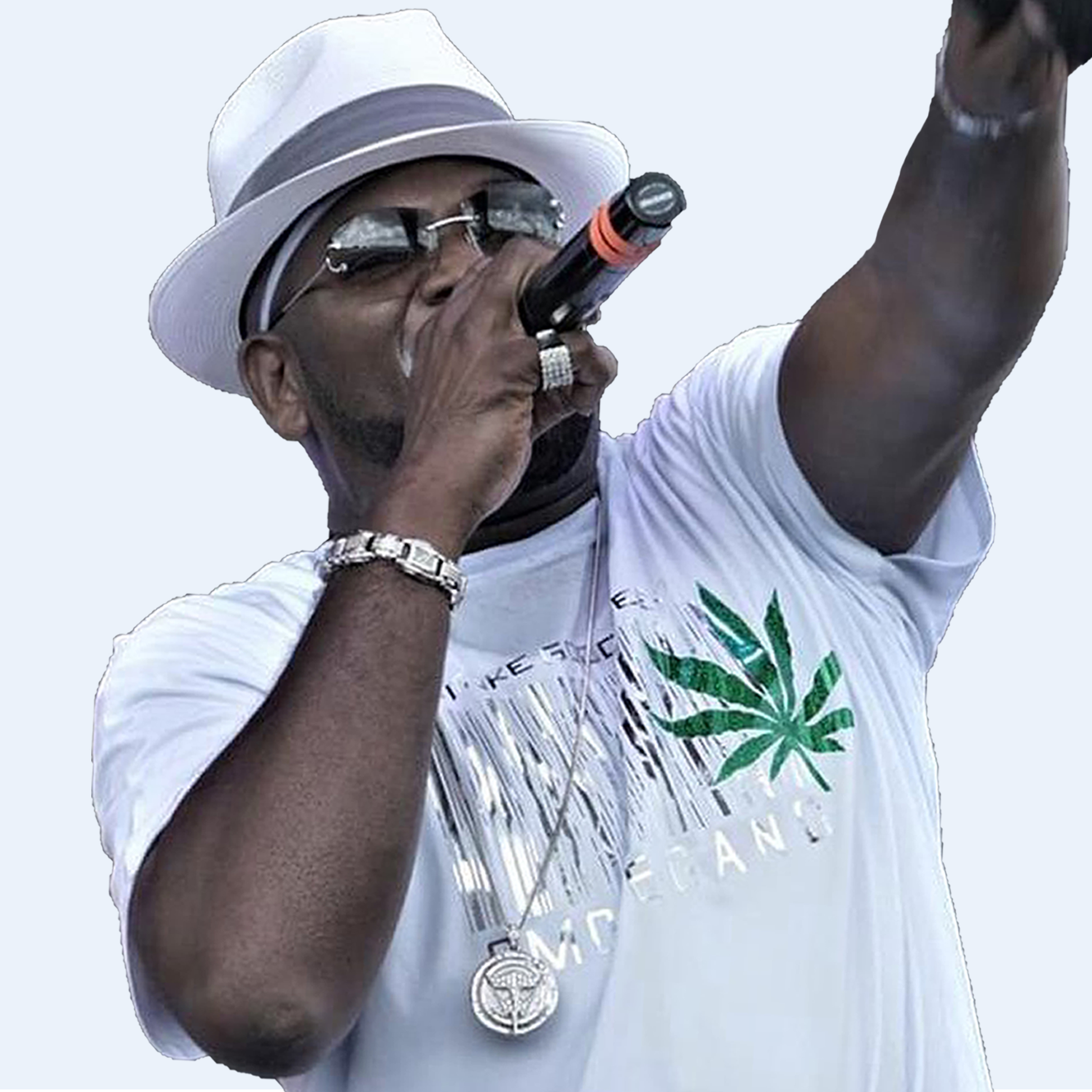

Background information
- Born: Christian Anthony Mathis; June 28, 1973 (age 53); Detroit, Michigan, U.S.
- Genres: Gangsta rap; hardcore hip hop
- Occupations: Rapper; record producer; actor
- Years active: 1990–present
- Labels: Universal; Motown; Koch; WonderBoy; Time; GSM
- Member of: Goon Sqwad
- Website: theflyzoneradio.com; Twitter

Christian Anthony Mathis (born June 28, 1973), better known by his stage name Trick Trick, is an American rapper and record producer from Detroit. He is a member of the hip hop group Goon Sqwad.

== Early life ==
Mathis was born on June 28, 1973, to George and Michelle Mathis in Detroit, Michigan. His brother, Kameel Mathis, is also a rapper who goes by the name Diezel.

== Discography ==
=== Studio albums ===
Year	Album details	Peak chart positions		
Year	Album details	US	US R&B	US Heat
2005	The People vs.: Released: December 27, 2005; Label: Motown	115	40	1
2008	The Villain: Released: November 11, 2008; Label: Koch Records	—	—	—
2018	SmokeGang: Released: April 20, 2018; Label: GSM Music Group	—	—	—
2021	ElemElem: Released: June 28, 2021; Label: GSM Music Group	—	—	—
"—" denotes releases that did not chart

=== Mixtapes ===
List of mixtapes, with year released
Title	Album details
The Wonder Boy Mixtape Vol. 1 (hosted by DJ Thrilla)	Released: 2005; Label: WonderBoy Entertainment/Time Entertainment
Straight Off 7 Mile (hosted by DJ Babe)	Released: November 29, 2010; Label: Self-released
The Landlord (hosted by DJ Thrilla)	Released: May 1, 2011; Label: Time Entertainment
The Godfather 3	Released: May 29, 2014; Label: Self-released
Outlaw	Released: January 16, 2016; Label: Time Entertainment/GSM Music Group
GateKeeper	Released: September 11, 2017; Label: GSM Music Group/Fly Zone Media/Time Entertainment

=== Singles ===
Year	Single	Peak chart positions				Certifications	Album
Year	Single	US	AUT	FIN	GER	Certifications	Album
2003	"It's Goin' Down"	—	—	—	—		—
2005	"Welcome 2 Detroit" (featuring Eminem)	100	24	12	20	RIAA: Gold	The People vs.
2008	"Let's Work"	—	—	—	—		The Villain
2008	"Let It Fly" (featuring Ice Cube and Lil Jon)	—	—	—	—		The Villain
2008	"Who Want It" (featuring Eminem)	—	—	—	—		The Villain
2011	"I Made It" (featuring D12)	—	—	—	—		Return of the Dozen Vol. 2
2013	"Smoke Weed Everyday"	—	—	—	—		—
2014	"Twerk Dat Pop That" (featuring Bad Meets Evil)	—	—	—	—		—
2014	"Detroit vs. Everybody" (with Bad Meets Evil, Big Sean, Danny Brown and Dej Loaf)	108	—	—	—		Shady XV
"—" denotes releases that did not chart

=== Guest appearances ===
List of non-single guest appearances, with other performing artists, showing year released and album name
Title	Year	Other artist(s)	Album
"K.T.F.O."	2004	Paradime, Kuniva	11 Steps Down
"There They Go"	2006	Obie Trice, Eminem, Big Herk	Second Round's on Me
"Last Call"	2007	Paradime, Cadillac Dale	Spill at Will
"Get Em"	2008	Black Milk, Bishop Lamont, Fatt Father, Marv Won	Caltroit
"Green Light"	2008	Fatt Father	Fatt Father
"That Nigga From the D"	2008	Fatt Father	Fatt Father
"Right Now"	2008	Fatt Father	Fatt Father
"Gangsta"	2009	Royce da 5'9"	Street Hop
"Let's Ryde Together"	2010	DJ Kay Slay, M.O.P., Trae tha Truth, Tre Williams	More Than Just a DJ
"I Made It"	2011	D12	Return of the Dozen Vol. 2
"Another One"	2011	Black Milk, Guilty Simpson, Heltah Skeltah	Random Axe
"Detroit vs. Everybody"	2014	Eminem, Royce da 5'9", Big Sean, Danny Brown, Dej Loaf	Shady XV
"Revenge"	2015	King 810	Midwest Monsters 2
"War Time"	2016	King 810	La Petite Mort or a Conversation with God
"Boom Boom Piggy"	2016	Big Hoodoo	Asylum
"Affiliated"	2016	Snoop Dogg	Coolaid
"Hecklers"	2017	The R.O.C., Kuniva	Digital Voodoo
"Gangsta Rhythm"	2017	DJ Kay Slay, Uncle Murda, Z-Ro, Ra Diggs	The Big Brother
"Danger"	2019	DJ Kay Slay, Young Buck, Uncle Murda, Don Q, Tony Yayo	Hip Hop Frontline
"Longevity"	2019	Apollo Brown, Marv Won, Moe Dirdee, Dez Andres	Sincerely, Detroit
"Midnight Flights"	2020	Berner, B-Real, Baby Bash	Los Meros
"Rolling 50 Deep"	2020	DJ Kay Slay, Sheek Louch, Styles P, Benny the Butcher, Bun B, Ghostface Killah, Raekwon, AZ, Papoose, Ransom, Memphis Bleek, M.O.P., Dave East, 3D Na'Tee, Joell Ortiz, Saigon, Mistah F.A.B., Chris Rivers, Jon Connor, Twista, E-40, Nino Man, Shoota 93, Mysonne, Sauce Money, Ice-T, RJ Payne, E-A-Ski, Fred the Godson, Loaded Lux, Termanology, Young Noble, E.D.I., Locksmith, Cassidy, Maino, Vado, Rockness, DJ Paul, McGruff, Stan Spit, Uncle Murda, Cory Gunz, Melle Mel, Grandmaster Caz, Trae tha Truth, Bynoe, Hocus 45th, Royce da 5'9"	Homage
"Rolling 110 Deep"	2021	DJ Kay Slay, Sheek Louch, Styles P, Dave East, Crooked I, Black Thought, Conway the Machine, Raekwon, Ghostface Killah, Inspectah Deck, Papoose, Loaded Lux, AZ, Bun B, Fred the Godson, Jim Jones, Ransom, Rah Digga, M.O.P., Trae tha Truth, Joell Ortiz, Lord Tariq, Peter Gunz, Cory Gunz, Shaquille O'Neal, Roy Jones Jr., Kool DJ Red Alert, Redman, Young Buck, MC Serch, Big Daddy Kane, MC Shan, KRS-One, Jon Connor, Twista, Drag-On, Chris Rivers, Nino Man, Locksmith, 3D Na'Tee, Tragedy Khadafi, E-A-Ski, Cassidy, Bumpy Knuckles, Gillie the Kid, Ice-T, Treach, Kool G Rap, Lil' Cease, RJ Payne, J.R. Writer, Shoota 93, Ms Hustle, Vado, Mysonne, Mistah F.A.B., Saigon, Melle Mel, Grandmaster Caz, Havoc, Tracey Lee, E.D.I., Young Noble, McGruff, Stan Spit, SickFlo, Fredro Starr, Sticky Fingaz, Ras Kass, Termanology, DJ DooWop, Junior Reid, Oun-P, Merkules, Wais P, Maino, Uncle Murda, PT Capone, Mike Cee, Royal Flush, Super Lover Cee, Page Kennedy, Rockness, Gunplay, Brand Nubian, Sonja Blade, Coke La Rock, Nice & Smooth, Consequence, Millyz, OT the Real, Ron Artest, Kaflow, Tone Trump, Hocus 45th, Omar Epps, Bodega Bamz, Bynoe, PTKNY, Aobie, King Kirk, Big Dubez, Tony Moxberg, Styleon, Chuck D, Sauce Money	Accolades

== Accolades ==
Year	Nominee / work	Award	Result	Ref.
2007	Himself	Detroit Music Award for Outstanding Hip-Hop Artist/Group	Won	
2020	Himself	Detroit Music Award for Outstanding Rap Artist or Group	Won	
