= The People vs. =

Studio album by Trick-Trick
- Released: December 27, 2005
- Studio: Batcave; 54 Sound (Detroit); X-Labs; Doppler Studios (Atlanta); Area 51, Brooklyn; Studio 612 (Bealeton)
- Genre: Hip-hop; gangsta rap
- Length: 1:05:57
- Label: WonderBoy Entertainment; Motown
- Producer: Trick-Trick (also exec.); Eminem; Mr. Porter; Luis Resto; Jazze Pha

Trick-Trick chronology
The People vs. (2005)	The Villain (2008)

Singles from The People vs.
- 1. "Welcome 2 Detroit" Released: November 8, 2005

Professional ratings
Review scores
Source	Rating
Now	2/5 Ns
RapReviews	5.5/10
Spin	D+

The People vs. is the debut solo studio album by American rapper Trick Trick. It was released on December 27, 2005, via WonderBoy Entertainment/Motown. Recording sessions took place at Batcave, at 54 Sound in Detroit, at X-Labs, at Doppler Studios in Atlanta, at Area 51, Brooklyn, and at Studio 612 in Bealeton, Virginia. Production was handled by Eminem, Mr. Porter, Jazze Pha and Trick Trick himself. It features guest appearances from his brother and Goon Sqwad bandmate Diezel, one-half of D12 members (Eminem, Kon Artis and Proof), Miz Korona, Obie Trice and Jazze Pha. The album peaked at number 115 on the Billboard 200. It spawned one single and a music video for "Welcome 2 Detroit".

== Track listing ==
No.	Title	Writer(s)	Producer(s)	Length
1.	"Intro"	Christian Mathis	Trick Trick	1:15
2.	"M-1"	C. Mathis	Trick Trick	4:02
3.	"Welcome 2 Detroit" (featuring Eminem)	C. Mathis; Marshall Mathers; Luis Resto	Eminem; Luis Resto^{[a]}	4:27
4.	"My Name Is Trick Trick"	C. Mathis	Trick Trick	3:49
5.	"Attitude Adjustment" (featuring Jazze Pha)	C. Mathis; Phalon Alexander	Jazze Pha	3:46
6.	"Big Mistake" (featuring Kon Artis)	C. Mathis; Denaun Porter	Mr. Porter	4:34
7.	"No More to Say" (featuring Proof and Eminem)	C. Mathis; DeShaun Holton; Mathers; Resto	Eminem; Trick Trick^{[a]}	3:55
8.	"Leave Your Past"	C. Mathis; Al Hudson; Cuba Gregory, Jr.; Irene Perkins; Valdez Brantley	Trick Trick	4:24
9.	"Lady (Let You Go)"	C. Mathis	Trick Trick	5:10
10.	"Let's Roll" (featuring Kon Artis)	C. Mathis; Porter	Mr. Porter	3:55
11.	"Get Bread"	C. Mathis	Trick Trick	4:40
12.	"Sucha"	C. Mathis	Trick Trick	3:56
13.	"War" (featuring Obie Trice)	C. Mathis; Obie Trice	Trick Trick	4:26
14.	"What da Fuck" (featuring Miz Korona)	C. Mathis; Paula Smiley	Trick Trick	4:29
15.	"Let's Scrap" (featuring Diezel)	C. Mathis; Kameel Mathis	Trick Trick	4:03
16.	"Head Bussa"	C. Mathis	Trick Trick	4:41
Total length:				1:05:57

Notes

- ^{^[a]} signifies an additional producer.

Sample credits

- Track 8 contains elements from "Don't Think About It" written by Al Hudson, Cuba Gregory, Irene Perkins and Valdez Brantley, and performed by One Way.
- At the end of track 3, MC Ren's verse of "Fuck tha Police" can be heard in the background.

== Personnel ==
- Christian Mathis – vocals, producer (tracks: 1, 2, 4, 8, 9, 11–16), additional producer (track 7), recording (tracks: 1–4, 6, 7, 9–16), mixing (tracks: 1, 2, 4, 9, 11–16), executive producer
- Marshall Mathers – vocals & producer (tracks: 3, 7), mixing & recording (track 3)
- Phalon Alexander – vocals & producer (track 5)
- Denaun Porter – vocals & producer (tracks: 6, 10)
- DeShaun Holton – vocals (track 7)
- Obie Trice – vocals (track 13)
- Paula Smiley – vocals (track 14)
- Kameel Mathis – vocals (track 15)
- Steven King – guitar & mixing (track 3), bass (track 7)
- Luis Resto – keyboards & additional producer (track 3), piano (track 7)
- Leslie Brathwaite – mixing (track 5)
- Michael "Mike Chav" Chavarria – mixing & recording (tracks: 6, 10)
- Mike Strange – mixing & recording (track 7)
- Tony Campana – recording (track 7)
- Chris Gehringer – mastering
- Eric T. Nicks – co-executive producer
- Kyle "Kyledidthis" Goen – art direction, design
- Roger Erickson – photography

== Charts ==
Chart (2006)	Peak position
US Billboard 200	115
US Top R&B/Hip-Hop Albums (Billboard)	40
US Top Rap Albums (Billboard)	25
US Heatseekers Albums (Billboard)	1
