= It's Called Life =

Studio album by Eternia
- Released: October 4, 2005
- Studio: Ecto 1 Studio (Toronto, ON); Jigsaaw Studios (Toronto, ON)
- Genre: Canadian hip hop
- Length: 44:15
- Label: Urbnet Records
- Producer: 2Rude; Collizhun; DJ Mercilless; Simahlak; Tone Mason

Eternia chronology
It's Called Life (2005)	At Last (2010)

Singles from It's Called Life
- 1. "Evidence" Released: 2005; 2. "Understand (If I)" Released: 2005; 3. "Love" Released: 2005; 4. "Struggle" Released: 2005

Professional ratings
Review scores
Source	Rating
PopMatters	6/10
RapReviews	9/10

It's Called Life is the debut studio album by Canadian rapper Eternia. It was released on October 4, 2005, via Urbnet Records. Recording sessions took place at Ecto 1 and Jigsaaw Studios in Toronto. Production was handled by 2Rude, Collizhun, DJ Mercilless, Simahlak and Tone Mason. It features guest appearances from DJ Dopey, Freestyle, Helixx C. Armageddon, Jessica Kaya, Kenn Starr, Wordsworth and Cesar Comanche.

At the Juno Awards of 2006, the album was nominated for a Juno Award for Rap Recording of the Year, but lost to K'naan's The Dusty Foot Philosopher.

== Track listing ==
No.	Title	Writer(s)	Producer(s)	Length
1.	"Truth"	Silk Kaya; Michael Pompey	DJ Mercilless	0:53
2.	"Evidence"	S. Kaya; Pompey	DJ Mercilless	3:27
3.	"Hate"	S. Kaya; Richard Coombs	2Rude	4:20
4.	"Beef"	Christopher Robinson		0:41
5.	"Family" (featuring Helixx C. Armageddon and DJ Dopey)	S. Kaya; Shantelena Mouzon; Jon Ryan Santiago; Sydney Chen	Simahlak	3:35
6.	"Time"	S. Kaya; Chen	Simahlak	2:15
7.	"Control"	S. Kaya; Tristan Graham; J Rod Golberg	Collizhun	3:48
8.	"Understand (If I)" (featuring Freestyle)	S. Kaya; Robert Wallace; Graham	Collizhun	3:53
9.	"Balance"	S. Kaya; Kenny Neal Jr.		4:18
10.	"Death"	S. Kaya		1:23
11.	"Love" (featuring Jessica Kaya)	S. Kaya; Jessica Kaya; Pompey; Golberg	DJ Mercilless	4:09
12.	"Struggle" (featuring Wordsworth and Kenn Starr)	S. Kaya; Vinson Johnson; Ken Jones; Anthony McIntyre	Tone Mason	4:18
13.	"Girls"	Robinson		0:31
14.	"Inspiration"	S. Kaya; Chen	Simahlak	2:11
15.	"Bang"	S. Kaya; Graham	Collizhun	4:05
16.	Untitled			0:28
Total length:				44:15

== Personnel ==
- Silk "Eternia" Kaya – vocals, executive producer, sleeve notes
- Richard "2Rude" Coombs – additional vocals (tracks: 3, 15), producer (track 3)
- Christopher "Cesar Comanche" Robinson – rant (tracks: 4, 13)
- Shantelena "Helixx C. Armageddon" Mouzon – vocals (track 5)
- Jon Ryan "DJ Dopey" Santiago – featured artist (track 5)
- Jessica Kaya – additional backing vocals (track 6), vocals (track 11)
- Chris Akinbode – additional backing vocals (track 6)
- Robert "Freestyle" Wallace – vocals (track 8)
- Vinson "Wordsworth" Johnson – vocals (track 12)
- Ken "Kenn Starr" Jones – vocals (track 12)
- George Reefah – additional vocals (track 15)
- Matisse – additional keyboards (track 7)
- Kenny Neal Jr. – additional guitar & recording (track 9)
- Erik Alcock – additional guitar (track 9)
- Lisa Marie DiLiberto – cello (track 11)
- Michael "DJ Mercilless" Pompey – producer (tracks: 1, 2, 11)
- Sydney "Simahlak" Chen – producer (tracks: 5, 6, 14)
- Tristan "Collizhun" Graham – producer (tracks: 7, 8, 15)
- Anthony "Mellenius" McIntyre – producer (track 12)
- J Rod Golberg – vocal producer (tracks: 7, 11), recording (tracks: 1, 11), additional recording (track 7), arranger (track 11)
- Rez – recording
- Mischa Chillak – recording (track 9)
- George Seara – mixing
- Tao – mixing (track 8)
- Greg Kolchinsky – mixing assistant
- Phil Demetro – mastering
- Bryan Brock – art direction, design
- Andrew Babcock – photography
