= Magnedo7 =

- Also known as: Magnedo7
- Born: Michael Crawford; November 7, 1983 (age 42)
- Origin: Winston-Salem, North Carolina, U.S.
- Genres: Hip hop
- Occupations: Record producer; songwriter
- Instruments: Drum machine; synthesizer; keyboards; bass; turntables; sampler
- Years active: 2006-present
- Labels: Black Market Entertainment; Sony/ATV; Universal; Grand Hustle
- Website: www.magnedo7.com

Michael Crawford, better known as Magnedo7, is an American music producer from North Carolina. He has worked with many artists including Jim Jones, Obie Trice, 50 Cent, Eminem and Ice Cube. Michael's first break in the music industry came with the production "Blow the Bank," on Jim Jones' album Pray IV Reign. Crawford holds a bachelor's degree in arts and science from North Carolina Agricultural and Technical State University.

Early life Michael Crawford (professionally known as Magnedo7) was born on November 7, 1983, in Winston-Salem, North Carolina. He began playing piano in the sixth grade, performing regularly at local churches. Around the same time, Crawford started recording music using a four-track TASCAM cassette recorder, which he purchased with money earned from weekend piano performances. As a youth, Crawford formed a musical ensemble with a childhood friend called Voices of Victory, later renamed Chosen for Praise. His early musical influences included Prince, Parliament-Funkadelic, and Busta Rhymes. He developed his musicianship by learning songs by ear and later expanded his production skills through music sampling techniques influenced by artists from this era. In 1999, while attending high school, Crawford met record producer Ski Beatz, who encouraged him to continue developing his production work. While attending North Carolina Agricultural and Technical State University, Crawford began producing beats from his dormitory room and co-founded a hip hop group known as The Internationalz. During this period, he performed as a rapping keyboardist while touring throughout the East Coast. After college, Crawford worked as a management trainee at Enterprise Rent-A-Car, where he promoted and sold copies of the group's independently released album. He also interned with Hidden Beach Recordings as a street team representative. Between 2003 and 2004, Crawford actively sought industry opportunities by contacting record labels and music managers through email and distributing promotional CDs. These efforts led to a management deal, which resulted in his first major-label placement as a producer on Pray IV Reign by Jim Jones. Career highlights and recognition (addition) Crawford later contributed production to Recovery by Eminem, which won the Grammy Award for Best Rap Album in 2011. He also received Grammy nominations for his work on projects by Justin Bieber, including production on the track Yukon.

== Elleisinc Music Group ==
In 2007, Magnedo7 started his production and publishing company called Elleisinc Music Group. Since the start of the company, music has been released on Shady/Aftermath Records, Interscope, Sony, Universal Music Group, Grand Hustle, G-unit, and also licensed on ESPN. EIMG, the label has also released music from ABC networks Rising Star contestant Shameia Crawford and has produced music for Miss Hawaii Candes Meijide Gentry and several independent artists from North Carolina, Georgia, Louisiana & Michigan.

== Discography ==
=== Solo albums ===
- 2013: Memoirs of an Architect
- 2014: Luvmesumu

=== Collaborative albums ===
- 2007: International Feel (The Internationalz)
- 2008: Internationalz Live (The Internationalz)
- 2011: Christmas 365 (Shameia Crawford)
- 2012: Love Game (Candes Meijide Gentry)
- 2013: Shop This EP (Shameia Crawford)
- 2015: Birthright (Shameia Crawford)
- 2015: Napoleon Syndrome EP (Quay Millinez)

== Other Production ==
- 2008: Present A Tribute to Bad Santa Starring Mike Epps (Jim Jones and Skull Gang)
- 2009: Pray IV Reign (Jim Jones)
- 2009: Delicious Japanese (Teriyaki Boyz)
- 2010: Recovery (Eminem)
- 2011: Welcome to Hell (Bad Meets Evil)
- 2012: Fly Therapy (Yung Booke)
- 2012: 5 Murder by Numbers (50 Cent)
- 2013: City on my Back (Yung Booke)]
- 2013: Sasquatch (Ice Cube)
- 2013: Y.O.U. (Tito Lopez)
- 2014: Bloodclaute Song (Future Fambo)
- 2015: The Hangover (Obie Trice)
- 2016: Ass (Obie Trice)
- 2017: Magnedo7 Bittersweet
- 2018: Magnedo7 Taskmaster Vol.1
- 2018: Mother My Next Guy Amina Buddafly
- 2018: (Everythang's Corrupt) Streets Shed Tears, One for the Money (Ice Cube)
- 2019: The Fifth (Obie Trice)
- 2019: This Life (Shameia Crawford)
- 2019: Here With You (Shameia Crawford)
- 2025: Swag (Justin Bieber)

== Awards and nominations ==
Year	Nominee / work	Award	Result	Year	Work	Award	Result	Ref.
2011	Recovery	Grammy Award for Album of the Year	Nominated					
2011	Recovery	Grammy Award for Best Rap Album	Won					
2025	Swag	Grammy Award for Album of the Year	Nominated					
