= Central conceit =

Underlying fictitious assumption of a work of fiction

In drama and other art forms, the central conceit of a work of fiction is the underlying fictitious assumption which must be accepted by the audience with suspension of disbelief so the plot may be seen as plausible.

For later literature and film, the term is sometimes used to refer to a device that stretches reality to take advantage of what Samuel Taylor Coleridge called the "willing suspension of disbelief." This usage is seldom seen in formal literary criticism. However, an example is the inability to escape from the watchful eye of the camera of Brian dePalma's Redacted, the central conceit of which was ruined by the poor acting.

An example from popular culture is the way many cartoons feature animals that can speak to each other, and in many cases can understand human speech, but humans cannot understand the speech of animals. This conceit is seen, and sometimes exploited for plot purposes, in such films as Over the Hedge, the Balto series, and Brother Bear.

A stereotypical assumption can be a central conceit, for example, in the film Suture, "who wouldn't want to 'pass' as white?" Another example is that of the sleeping giant or "American waking" in the work of poet Greg Delanty.

== See also ==
- Magic realism – Style of literary fiction and art
