= Eternia (rapper) =

Canadian rapper (born 1980)

- Born: Silk-Anne Semiramis Dawn Craig Kaya; May 13, 1980 (age 46)
- Origin: Ottawa, Ontario, Canada
- Genres: Hip hop
- Occupations: Rapper, songwriter
- Years active: 1997–present
- Labels: Fat Beats Records, Urbnet Records
- Website: www.therealeternia.com

Silk-Anne Semiramis Dawn Craig Kaya (born May 13, 1980), better known by her stage name Eternia, is a Canadian rapper who has released several albums of hip-hop music.

== Early life ==
Eternia was born in Ottawa, Ontario. Growing up in a musical family, she learned to play piano, flute and classical guitar. She left home and dropped out of high school at age 15. After travelling around and becoming involved with the hip-hop scene, she returned to complete high school and then enrolled in a journalism course in Toronto.

== Career ==
Eternia released her first full-length album, It's Called Life in 2005. It was subsequently nominated for Best Rap Recording of the Year at the 2006 Juno Awards. She has performed on the Van's Warped Tour, as well as at SXSW and NXNE.

Her 2010 album At Last (Fat Beats Records), a collaboration with producer MoSS, was named as a longlisted nominee for the 2011 Polaris Music Prize. At Last also brought Eternia her second Juno Award nomination for Rap Recording of the Year in 2011. Eternia and MoSS released a single, "Day and Night", in 2016; that year she also released the solo single "Keep U".

In 2013, Eternia performed on the track "Love Means", part of Shad's album Flying Colours.

Eternia is managed by Graig 'Sav' Stanton, of The Newprint.

== Discography ==
Studio albums

- It's Called Life (2005)
- At Last (with MoSS, 2010)
- Free (with Rel McCoy, 2021)

Mixtapes

- Where I Been – The Collection (2005)
- Where I'm At – The Setup (2007)
- Get Caught Up (2009)
