= Special Reserve (Obie Trice album) =

Compilation album by Obie Trice & MoSS
- Released: December 15, 2009 (U.S.)
- Recorded: 1997–2000
- Genre: Hip-hop
- Length: 35:48
- Label: MoSS Appeal Music
- Producer: Jason "MoSS" Connoy (also exec.); Dan Green (exec.)

Obie Trice & MoSS chronology
Second Round's on Me (2006)	Special Reserve (2009)	Bottoms Up (2012)

Singles from Special Reserve
- 1. "Got Hungry" Released: November 10, 2009

Professional ratings
Review scores
Source	Rating
RapReviews.com	(8.0/10)
XXL	(XL)

Special Reserve is a compilation album by rapper Obie Trice and producer MoSS. It was released on December 15, 2009. Special Reserve served as a preface for Obie's then upcoming album Bottom's Up. The album's only guest appearance is on "Roughnecks", featuring Deuce Wonder. The album also features scratching by DJ Grouch (Turnstylez Crew) on "Got Hungry", "I Am", "On & On" and "4 Stories," and instrumentation by G Koop on 9 of the 11 tracks. The album contains 10 tracks and a bonus track, all produced by MoSS, who is also the first producer signed to DJ Premier's "Works of Mart" production company.

The album is a collection of Obie Trice tracks recorded with MoSS from 1997 to 2000.

== Track listing ==
The track listing was confirmed by RapBasement.com.

No.	Title	Length
1.	"Welcome"	1:29
2.	"Got Hungry"	3:45
3.	"You've Been Slain"	1:59
4.	"On & On"	3:30
5.	"I Am"	3:21
6.	"4 Stories"	2:07
7.	"Roughnecks" (featuring Deuce Wonder)	4:26
8.	"Cool Cats"	3:25
9.	"What You Want"	3:31
10.	"Jack My Dick"	3:20
11.	"Dope, Jobs, Homeless" (bonus track)	4:20

- Note: All tracks produced by MoSS for Works of Mart.
