= The Set Up (song) =

"The Set Up (You Don't Know)"

Single by Obie Trice featuring Nate Dogg

from the album Cheers
- Released: January 13, 2004
- Recorded: 2003: Record One; 54 Sound
- Genre: Hip-hop
- Length: 3:13
- Label: Shady; Interscope
- Songwriters: Obie Trice; Nathaniel Hale; Andre Young; Mike Elizondo
- Producers: Dr. Dre; Mike Elizondo (co.)

Obie Trice singles chronology
"Shit Hits the Fan" (2003)	"The Set Up (You Don't Know)" (2004)	"Snitch" (2006)

Nate Dogg singles chronology
"Ooh Wee" (2004)	"The Set Up" (2004)	"Time's Up" (2004)

"The Set Up (You Don't Know)" is a song performed by American rapper Obie Trice, featuring vocals from singer Nate Dogg, released as the third and final single from Trice's debut studio album, Cheers. The track was produced by Dr. Dre.

== Background ==
An official remix of "The Set Up (You Don't Know)" was released as a B-side to the official CD single. The track features, as well as Nate Dogg, appearances from Lloyd Banks, Jadakiss and Redman. The remix was labeled the "Dr. Dre Remix" and was entirely produced by Dre.

== Reception ==
Steve Juon of RapReviews described "The Set Up (You Don't Know)" as "expertly put together by Dr. Dre", whilst Cynthia Fuchs of PopMatters praised it as "a vivid tale of vengeance and bling-lust" that "work[s] on multiple levels".

== Music video ==
The video for "The Set Up (You Don't Know)" features Trice being put 'under the spell' of a lady, who encourages him to steal a lot of money. Little does he realize, it's a setup, and he gets shot in order for her to get away the money. But as Karma would have it, she gets shot and the money gets stolen from her. The video ends with Obie getting up, being thankful for wearing a bulletproof vest. Other than Obie Trice and Nate Dogg, the video features Mýa acting as the charming lady, as well as brief cameo appearances by D12 and Warren G at the very beginning.

== Track listing ==
CD single

No.	Title	Writer(s)	Producer(s)	Length
1.	"The Set Up (You Don't Know)" (feat. Nathaniel Hale)	Obie Trice; Nathaniel Hale; Andre Young; Mike Elizondo	Dr. Dre; Mike Elizondo^{[a]}	3:13
2.	"The Set Up (You Don't Know)" (Dr. Dre remix) (feat. Lloyd Banks, Jadakiss and Redman)			5:40
3.	"Rap Name" (DJ Twins remix) (feat. Eminem and Keith Murray)			4:08
4.	"The Set Up (You Don't Know)" (music video)

Notes

- ^{^[a]} signifies a co-producer.

== Charts ==
=== Weekly charts ===
Chart (2004)	Peak position
Australia (ARIA)	52
Ireland (IRMA)	43
Scotland Singles (OCC)	46
Switzerland (Schweizer Hitparade)	53
UK Hip Hop/R&B (OCC)	4
UK Singles (OCC)	32
US Billboard Hot 100	73
US Hot R&B/Hip-Hop Songs (Billboard)	39
US Hot Rap Songs (Billboard)	12
US Rhythmic Airplay (Billboard)	30

=== Year-end charts ===
Chart (2004)	Position
UK Urban (Music Week) "The Set Up" / "Rap Name"	32
