= Got Some Teeth =

2003 single by Obie Trice

Single by Obie Trice

from the album Cheers
- Released: August 12, 2003
- Recorded: 2003: 54 Sound in Detroit, Michigan
- Genre: Hip-hop
- Length: 3:47
- Label: Shady; Interscope
- Songwriters: Obie Trice; Marshall Mathers; Luis Resto; Steve King; Anne Dudley; Malcolm McLaren; Trevor Horn
- Producers: Eminem; Luis Resto (add.)

Obie Trice singles chronology
"Rap Name" (2002)	"Got Some Teeth" (2003)	"Shit Hits the Fan" (2003)

"Got Some Teeth" is the first single from American rapper Obie Trice's 2003 debut solo studio album, Cheers. The song was used as the theme song for the character "Compton-Ass Terry" in the TV show Viva la Bam on MTV. "Got Some Teeth" peaked at number 54 on the Billboard Hot 100. Outside of the United States, "Got Some Teeth" peaked within the top ten of the charts in Belgium (Flanders), Denmark, Ireland, New Zealand, and the United Kingdom.

== Background ==
The song details Obie's various encounters with women in a bar. In the first verse he meets "Veronica", and invites her to Cheers and then offers her sex and various acts outside of the bar. In the second verse, Trice is enticed to approach "Karen", but doesn't due to her having a venereal disease and many children with various men. She still confronts him for a one-night stand because she doesn't want to go home to another night of masturbation, Trice agrees saying that he wouldn't want to head home with a woman who has implants. He leaves the bar to find a group of women making fun of him until he opens fire on them via a gun he had hidden in the trunk of his car. In the last verse the bar is filled with obese women and Trice feels out of place because he has a "big-girl disorder". He leaves to find another bar with thinner women and exclaims "Lean Cuisine wouldn't hurt much". The chorus details Trice's hopes of waking up after a one-night stand to a woman without fake teeth, portrayed in the video as dentures.

== Music video ==
The music video for the song features Eminem as a bartender, "disguised" with a moustache, and Kuniva of D12 dressed as his alter ego, Rondell Beene, as another bartender, saving Obie and Kon Artis from a fat girl. The host of game show "Dream Date" in the video, which is intended to be a spoof on the television reality show "Blind Date", is played by actor Matt Sawyer, who uses his real name as the character.

== Track listing ==
CD single

No.	Title	Writer(s)	Producer(s)	Length
1.	"Got Some Teeth"	Obie Trice; Marshall Mathers; Luis Resto; Steve King; Anne Dudley; Malcolm McLaren; Trevor Horn	Eminem; Luis Resto^{[a]}	3:47
2.	"Shit Hits the Fan" (featuring Dr. Dre and Eminem)	Trice; Mathers; Andre Young; Mike Elizondo	Dr. Dre; Mike Elizondo^{[b]}	4:55
3.	"Love Me" (Eminem, Obie Trice and 50 Cent)	Mathers; Trice; Curtis Jackson; Resto; Steve King	Eminem; Resto^{[a]}	3:50
4.	"Got Some Teeth" (music video)			4:00
Total length:				16:32

Notes

- ^{^[a]} signifies an additional producer.
- ^{^[b]} signifies a co-producer.

== Chart performance ==
"Got Some Teeth" peaked at number 54 on the Billboard Hot 100.

In the United Kingdom, the song debuted and peaked at number eight on the UK Singles Chart on October 26, 2003.

=== Weekly charts ===
Chart (2003)	Peak position
Australia (ARIA)	15
Australian Urban (ARIA)	5
Belgium (Ultratip Bubbling Under Flanders)	3
Denmark (Tracklisten)	8
Ireland (IRMA)	10
Italy (FIMI)	47
Netherlands (Dutch Top 40)	17
Netherlands (Single Top 100)	32
New Zealand (Recorded Music NZ)	8
Scotland Singles (OCC)	14
UK Hip Hop/R&B (OCC)	5
UK Singles (OCC)	8
US Billboard Hot 100	54
US Hot R&B/Hip-Hop Songs (Billboard)	33
US Hot Rap Songs (Billboard)	12
US Rhythmic Airplay (Billboard)	12

=== Year-end charts ===
Chart (2003)	Position
UK Singles (OCC)	165
UK Urban (Music Week)	23

== Certifications ==
Region	Certification	Certified units/sales
Australia (ARIA)	Gold	35,000^{^}
^{^} Shipments figures based on certification alone.
