= Janine Cirincione =

American curator and multimedia artist

- Born: Janine Cirincione; 1961 (age 64–65); United States
- Notable work: Dark Decor Possible Worlds; Through the Looking Glass: Arttsts' First Encounter with Virtual Reality School Days
- Spouse: Michael Ferraro

Janine Cirincione (born 1961) is an American curator and multimedia artist. She is a director at the contemporary art gallery Gagosian. From 2011 to 2024 Cirincione was a co-director and partner at Sean Kelly Gallery and was formerly the director of the Tilton Gallery where she curated “School Days” in 2006 and “Through the Looking Glass: Artists’ First Encounters with Virtual Reality” in 1992. From 1993-1994, she was an artist in residence at the Wexner Center for the Arts along with Brian D'Amato and Michael Ferraro. Her project, "Real Life," (2001) created 2D animated characters which reacted to the real world of the gallery environment via sensors. Cirincione has also been the president of content development at PossibleWorlds.
