= Second Round's on Me =

Studio album by Obie Trice
- Released: July 28, 2006
- Recorded: 2004–06
- Studios: 54 Sound (Ferndale, MI); Live Wire Studios (Sacramento, CA); SickNotes Lab (Oak Park, MI); The Hit Factory Criteria; Barmitzvah Hall Studios (Century City, CA); Living Proof Studios
- Genre: Hip-hop
- Length: 1:02:18
- Labels: Shady; Interscope
- Producers: Akon; Emile; Eminem; J. R. Rotem; Swinga; Trell; Witt & Pep; Riggs Morales; Mr. Lee; 9th Wonder

Obie Trice chronology
Cheers (2003)	Second Round's on Me (2006)	Special Reserve (2009)

Singles from Second Round's on Me
- 1. "Snitch" Released: May 23, 2006; 2. "Cry Now" Released: July 18, 2006; 3. "Jamaican Girl" Released: August 15, 2006

Second Round's on Me is the second studio album by American rapper Obie Trice. It was released on July 28, 2006, via Shady/Interscope Records, making his second and final studio album for the label. Recording sessions took place at 54 Sound in Ferndale, Live Wire Studios in Sacramento, SickNotes Lab in Oak Park, Barmitzvah Hall Studios in Century City, The Hit Factory Criteria and Living Proof Studios. Production was handled by Eminem, J. R. Rotem, Akon, Emile, Swinga, Trell, Witt & Pep, with co-producer Riggs Morales and additional producer Luis Resto. It features guest appearances from Trey Songz, Jaguar Wright, 50 Cent, Akon, Big Herk, Brick & Lace, Eminem, Nate Dogg and Trick-Trick.

In the United States, the album peaked at number 8 on the Billboard 200 and number 5 on the Top R&B/Hip Hop Albums charts with 74,000 copies sold in its first week. As of January 2016, the album has sold 240,000 units. Along with the singles, accompanying music videos were released for "Snitch", "Cry Now" and "Jamaican Girl".

== Critical reception ==
Professional ratings
Aggregate scores
Source	Rating
Metacritic	48/100
Review scores
Source	Rating
About.com	3/5 stars
AllHipHop	3/5 stars
AllMusic	3.5/5 stars
HipHopDX	4.5/5
Now	2/5 Ns
PopMatters	3/10
RapReviews	8.5/10
Rolling Stone	2/5 stars
Vibe	3.5/5
XXL	4/5 (XL)

Second Round's on Me was met with mixed or average reviews from music critics. At Metacritic, which assigns a normalized rating out of 100 to reviews from mainstream publications, the album received an average score of 48 based on nine reviews.

Jeff Ryce of HipHopDX gave high praise to Trice for having more of a presence on his own record to display his improved lyricism, vocal delivery and choice in beats, writing: "these days everyone likes to think that every respectable artist has one "classic" in their catalogue. If that is the case, Second Round's On Me will likely go down as Obie's". Brendan Frederick of XXL praised Trice and Eminem for having "superb attention to visual details and calculated rhyme structure" and an "expanded production palate" throughout the album to deliver in telling "bleak oratories of Detroit's streets" but also highlighted Rotem's contributions on "Mama" and "Obie Story" for allowing Trice to show "historical context to his struggles", concluding with: "filled with unflinching street tales and dense lyrical couplets, Second Round should be sipped slowly for full potency. No shots to the head necessary". AllMusic's editor wrote: "Leaning heavily on a mid-paced, paranoid gangsta rap production style, evidenced on tracks like "They Wanna Kill Me" and "Snitch", Trice stakes his claim as a tough, swaggering performer whose self-awareness never undermines his hard, ghetto edge". Thomas Golianopoulos of Vibe praised Eminem for supplying Trice's "sinister outlook" with "equally gloomy production" on tracks like "Violent" and "The Ballad of Obie", but highlighted "Mama" for showcasing Trice with "a much sunnier disposition".

In mixed reviews, Gilbert Cruz of Entertainment Weekly called it "a more subdued affair" than Trice's debut because it lacked Timbaland and Dr. Dre's "jaunty beats" and with more "repetitive, simplistic production" from Eminem, concluding that "Second Round's on Me does have moments of cross-genre joy, but this round goes down like a cheap well drink". Jason Richards of Now found "the Second Round isn't much different from the first". Peter Relic of Rolling Stone wrote: "full of creepy, minor-key themes and powered by homicidal mania, Second Round is wholly lacking in the playfulness that made his debut, Cheers, a varied delight".

In his negative review for PopMatters, Mike Joseph gave credit to Trice for having a "solid" flow, but criticised the "tired, predictable subject matter" throughout the track listing and Eminem's production feeling "agonisingly predictable" and "substandard" to distract listeners from the hate-filled material, concluding that: "Second Round's on Me just emphasises everything that's wrong with gangsta rap, which started out as admirable street reporting and has regressed into wanton violence which should be viewed as a cartoon, but a generation of urban youth has unfortunately come to accept as gospel".

== Promotion ==
Jessy Terrero directed a music video for the album's lead single, "Snitch" featuring and co-starring Akon. Both performers can be seen and heard on the CBS series CSI: Crime Scene Investigation in the episode "Poppin' Tags" performing the song. The song made it to number 37 in Sweden, number 39 in Australia, number 44 in Ireland and the UK and number 58 in France.

Justin Francis shot a music video for the second single off of the album, "Cry Now". The song was later remixed for 2006 Eminem Presents: The Re-Up featuring Kuniva, Bobby Creekwater, Ca$his and Stat Quo.

A music video for the third and final single, "Jamaican Girl" featuring and co-starring Nyanda and Nyla, was directed by Sanaa Hamri. The song was used in the HBO series Entourage in the episode "I Wanna Be Sedated" and in Christian Alvart's supernatural horror film Case 39.

== Track listing ==
No.	Title	Writer(s)	Producer(s)	Length
1.	"Intro"			0:37
2.	"Wake Up"	Obie Trice III; Marshall Mathers; Luis Resto; Steven King	Eminem; Luis Resto^{[a]}	2:51
3.	"Violent"	Trice; King; Resto; Mathers	Eminem; Luis Resto^{[a]}	4:04
4.	"Wanna Know"	Trice; Emile Haynie; William Jones; Dennis Webber	Emile	4:03
5.	"Lay Down"	Trice; Resto; Mathers	Eminem; Luis Resto^{[a]}	2:54
6.	"Snitch" (featuring Akon)	Trice; Aliaune Thiam	Akon	4:01
7.	"Cry Now"	Trice; Larry Louis; Darell Campbell; Dewitt Moore; Bryan Johnson; Joseph Scott; Don Robey	Witt & Pep	3:59
8.	"Ballad of Obie Trice"	Trice; King; Resto; Mathers	Eminem	2:53
9.	"Jamaican Girl" (featuring Brick & Lace)	Trice; Mike Strange; Mathers	Eminem	3:38
10.	"Kill Me a Mutha"	Trice; Resto; Mathers	Eminem; Luis Resto^{[a]}	3:21
11.	"Out of State"	Trice; Joseph Cooley; Mathers; Resto; Marvin Gaye; George Bohanon; Michael Henderson	Swinga; Eminem^{[a]}	2:30
12.	"All of My Life" (featuring Nate Dogg)	Trice; Nathaniel Hale; Contrell Smith; Mathers	Trell; Eminem^{[a]}	4:15
13.	"Ghetto" (featuring Trey Songz)	Trice; Tremaine Neverson; Jonathan Rotem; Lee Hazlewood	J. R. Rotem	4:20
14.	"There They Go" (featuring Big Herk, Eminem and Trick-Trick)	Trice; Amery Dennard; Mathers; Chris Mathis; King; Resto	Eminem; Luis Resto^{[a]}	3:49
15.	"Mama" (featuring Trey Songz)	Trice; Neverson; Rotem; Robert James	J. R. Rotem	4:09
16.	"24's"	Trice; Rotem	J. R. Rotem	3:18
17.	"Everywhere I Go" (featuring 50 Cent)	Trice; Curtis Jackson; Mathers; Resto	Eminem; Luis Resto^{[a]}	3:41
18.	"Obie Story"	Trice; Rotem	J. R. Rotem; Riggs Morales^{[c]}	3:55
Total length:				1:02:18

Japanese edition bonus tracks
No.	Title	Writer(s)	Producer(s)	Length
19.	"Terrible"	Trice	Mr. Lee
20.	"Luv" (featuring Jaguar Wright)	Trice; Danny Robert Hamilton	9th Wonder

Notes

- ^{^[a]} signifies an additional producer.
- ^{^[c]} signifies a co-producer.

Sample credits

- Track 4 contains a sample of "It Couldn't Be" written by Bill Jones and Dennie Weber as performed by the Power Of Zeus
- Track 5 samples vocals of Spectrasonics' "Vocal Planet"
- Track 7 contains a sample of "Blind Man" written by Joseph Scott and Don Robey as performed by Bobby Bland
- Track 11 contains a sample of "Checking Out" written by Marvin Gaye, George Bohanon and Michael Henderson as performed by Marvin Gaye
- Track 13 contains interpolations from "Friday's Child" as written and performed by Lee Hazlewood
- Track 15 contains excerpts from "Touch Me Baby" written by Bob James as performed by Freddie Hubbard

== Legacy ==
The song "Wanna Know" was used for a Science Channel commercial, and appeared in episode 5 of Friday Night Lights, in the HBO series Entourage in the episode "The Sundance Kids" and in the video game Fight Night Round 3 for the Xbox 360 and PS3.

== Personnel ==
- Obie Trice – vocals
- Chucquel Davis – voice (track 1), additional vocals (track 18)
- Marshall "Eminem" Mathers – additional vocals (track 2), vocals (track 14), producer (tracks: 2, 3, 5, 8–10, 14, 17), additional producer (tracks: 11, 12), recording (track 11), mixing (tracks: 2–18), executive producer
- Aliaune Akon Thiam – vocals & producer (track 6)
- Nailah "Nyla" Thorbourne – vocals (track 9)
- Nyanda Thorbourne – vocals (track 9)
- Nathaniel "Nate Dogg" Hale – vocals (track 12)
- Tremaine "Trey Songz" Neverson – vocals (tracks: 13, 15)
- Amery "Big Herk" Dennard – vocals (track 14)
- Chris "Trick-Trick" Mathis – vocals (track 14)
- Curtis "50 Cent" Jackson – vocals (track 17)
- Gerald Goodwin III – additional vocals (track 18)
- Steve King – guitar (tracks: 2, 3, 9, 14), bass (tracks: 2, 3, 8, 9, 14), additional keyboards (track 6), acoustic and electric guitar (track 8), additional guitar (track 13), recording (tracks: 4, 11), mixing (tracks: 3, 4, 6–18)
- Luis Resto – keyboards (tracks: 2, 3, 5, 8, 10, 14), additional keyboards (tracks: 6, 9, 12, 13, 18), vocoder (track 8), additional bass (track 18), additional producer (tracks: 2, 3, 5, 10, 14, 17)
- Mike Strange – additional keyboards (track 6), keyboards (track 9), recording (tracks: 1–6, 8–10, 12, 14, 17, 18), mixing (tracks: 3, 5, 6, 9, 10, 17, 18), additional recording (tracks: 13, 15, 16)
- Larry "Live" Louis – guitar & bass (track 7)
- Darrell "Reed" Campbell – keyboards (track 7)
- Timothy "Square Biz" Thomas – instrumentation (track 12)
- Emile Haynie – producer (track 4)
- Dewitt "Witt" Moore – producer & mixing (track 7)
- Bryan "Pep" Johnson – producer & recording (track 7)
- Joseph T. "Swinga" Cooley – producer (track 11)
- Contrell "Trell" Smith – producer (track 12)
- Jonathan "J.R." Rotem – producer & arrangement (tracks: 13, 15, 16, 18)
- Rigo "Riggs" Morales – co-producer (track 18), A&R
- Tony Campana – recording (tracks: 2–6, 8–10, 12, 14, 17, 18), additional recording (tracks: 7, 13, 15, 16)
- Jeremiah "J Man" Ellison – recording (track 4)
- Marc Lee – recording (track 9)
- James Roach – recording assistant (track 9)
- Zach Katz – additional recording (track 18)
- Brian "Big Bass" Gardner – mastering
- Phil Knott – photography
- Jonathan Mannion – additional photography
- Marcus Heisser – A&R coordinator
- Marc Labelle – A&R
- Tracy McNew – A&R

== Charts ==
Chart (2006)	Peak position
Belgian Albums (Ultratop Flanders)	94
Canadian Albums (Billboard)	4
Dutch Albums (Album Top 100)	97
French Albums (SNEP)	42
Irish Albums (IRMA)	50
New Zealand Albums (RMNZ)	29
Scottish Albums (Official Charts)	77
Swiss Albums (Schweizer Hitparade)	31
UK Albums (Official Charts)	46
UK R&B Albums (Official Charts)	5
US Billboard 200	8
US Top R&B/Hip-Hop Albums (Billboard)	5
US Top Rap Albums (Billboard)	2
