= Rigo Morales =

American music executive, producer, author (born 1976)

Rigo "Riggs" Morales
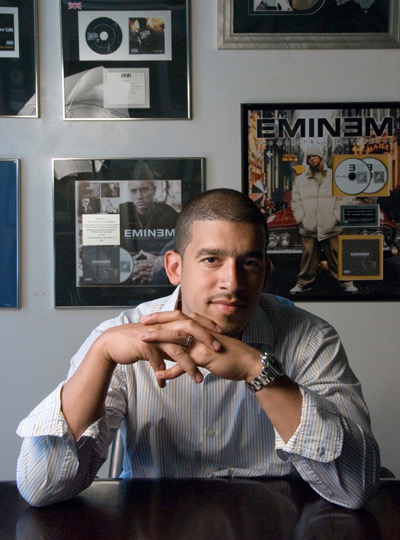

Background information
- Born: Rigo Morales; August 22, 1976 (age 49); New York City, New York
- Genres: Urban, Hip hop
- Occupation: Music Eeecutive

Rigo "Riggs" Morales is a music executive, writer, producer, author, and former music journalist. He began his career as a music writer for publications such as The Source, XXL, Vibe and The Fader, and later became a record label executive known for working with artists such as Eminem, 50 Cent, Wiz Khalifa, Janelle Monae, and for producing the Original Broadway Cast Recording for the Tony Award-winning musical, Hamilton.

== Life and career ==
Morales was born in Harlem, New York and later raised in the Washington Heights neighborhood of New York City. He is of Dominican and Puerto Rican descent.

=== The Source Magazine ===
By 1995, Riggs landed an internship at the Source Magazine, where he rose from assistant to staff writer to Senior Associate Music Editor.

From 1995 to 2000, Morales wrote for the magazine's most popular columns, including the Hip-Hop Quotable, Fat Mix-Tape, Singles Watch, the polarizing mic-rated Record Report as well as the Unsigned Hype page. During this time, The Source reigned as the number 1 music magazine on newsstands in the United States. For the Unsigned Hype column, Riggs would find and spotlight unsigned artists across the country. Some of his discoveries include David Banner, Canadian Hip Hop legend Kardinal Official, Dip Set's Juelz Santana and the most prominent of his discoveries, Eminem. Riggs profiled Eminem in the Source's March 98 issue, before he would go on to become one of the most iconic figures in music. After leaving the Source, Morales continued to write for other music outlets, such as XXL, The Fader and Allhiphop.com, before moving on from writing full time to pursue the business side of music in 2001.

=== Shady Records/Goliath Artists, Inc. ===
Morales became an artist representative for Goliath Artists, Inc., the management firm founded by Eminem's manager, Paul Rosenberg. Working with a roster that included Eminem, Cypress Hill, and Xzibit, Morales helped expand the company's roster to include music producers, such as The Alchemist, DJ Muggs of Cypress Hill, Dame Grease and The Beatnuts. In 2001, Rosenberg and Eminem appointed Morales to the Director of A&R at the newly formed Shady Records, which lead to the signing of 50 Cent and propelled Shady into one of the most prominent rap labels in music. 50 Cent's debut album, Get Rich Or Die Tryin' debuted at number one on the Billboard 200 charts, selling 872,000 copies in its first week. It was the best-selling album of 2003, selling 12 million copies worldwide by the end of the year and was ranked as the number one album of the year on the Billboard 200.

Morales would go on to provide A&R on many of the label’s seminal releases including the 8 Mile soundtrack, 50 Cent The Massacre, Eminem Presents: The Re-Up, Obie Trice Cheers, Bad Meets Evil Hell: The Sequel and Eminem’s Recovery. Morales won 2011 Grammy acknowledgment for his work on Eminem’s comeback album, Recovery, where he secured the diamond-selling single, "Love The Way You Lie," featuring Rihanna. In 2011, Bad Meets Evil debuted at Number one on the Billboard charts and featured the platinum single, "Lighters" featuring Bruno Mars. Morales provided Eminem with his latest number one hit, "Monster" featuring Rihanna, before departing to Atlantic Records in 2014.

=== Atlantic Records ===
In 2014, Morales was appointed to Vice President of A&R and Artist Development at Atlantic Records, where he worked with artists such as The Marias, Wiz Khalifa, Janelle Monae, O.T. Genasis, Action Bronson, Alt-J, Tayla Parx, Joyner Lucas, and the groundbreaking hit Broadway musical ‘’Hamilton’’. His work on Wiz Khalifa’s sophomore release Black Hollywood garnered two Grammy nominations for Best Hip Hop Album and Best Hip Hop song in 2015 for "We Dem Boyz," while his work with Monáe on Dirty Computer led to a Grammy nomination for Album of the Year in 2019.

In March 2020, Morales was promoted to Senior Vice President of A&R and Artist Development at Atlantic Records.

=== Hamilton ===
In 2015, Morales signed and co-produced Hamilton: Original Broadway Cast Album with Pulitzer Prize-winning playwright Lin-Manuel Miranda. The album is certified 6 times platinum with 19 certified Gold and Platinum singles by the RIAA. In 2016, Hamilton OBCR received the Grammy Award for Best Musical as well as a Tony Award for Best Original Score. it is the only Broadway cast album to ever debut number one on Billboard's Rap Charts. Morales later executive produced The Hamilton Mixtape, a 23-track collection of songs remixing the music from Hamilton OBCR. The album included contributions by Nas, Kelly Clarkson, Jimmy Fallon, Wiz Khalifa, Alicia Keys, Ashanti, Busta Rhymes, Ben Folds, Regina Spektor, Queen Latifah, Common, Usher, Sia and Chance The Rapper. The album was certified Gold in 2016. Morales followed up with Hamildrops, a series of songs inspired by the musical that featured takes from Weird Al Yankovic, Mobb Deep, Sara Bareilles and President Barack Obama.

=== Other work ===
In 2005, Morales co-produced The Monday Night Fight Klub alongside founders and creative directors 12 Gauge Media, a bi-weekly event that pitted emcees against each other in a verbal competition. MNFK was later developed into an MTV series. In 2005, Morales' launched his own media company, Rigg'd Up, Inc. partnering with Quincy Jones III's QD3 Entertainment (Beef, Tupac: Thug Angel, The MC) to create hip-hop based content ranging from in a variety of mediums including television, movies, and DVDs.

Morales has consulted for corporations such as Pepsi Inc., Sony Records, PolyGram, Adidas and has served as on-air correspondent for MTV and VH1. Morales has also remained a freelance writer for XXL, Vibe, Scratch, Urban Latino and Mass Appeal, and has written biographies for Pun. Eminem, Clipse, Mobb Deep, Fat Joe, the Beatnuts and producers such as Buckwild, The Alchemist, Muggs of Cypress Hill. Additionally, he co-wrote the book Angry Blonde with Eminem.

In December 2008, Morales mentored three finalists, including winner Durella, on MTV's "Advance Warning" competition in Africa, which aired on MTV in December 2008 and features Riggs working with and developing the three finalist as they attempt to create hit records with international appeal.

In 2009, Morales co-founded a comic book publishing company with Darryl "DMC" McDaniels of Run-DMC. In 2009, he produced the Marvelous Color, an art exhibition that celebrate Marvel Comics' 70th anniversary by honoring its most iconic African-American superheroes.

== The Recording Academy ==
Morales is an active member of The Recording Academy (The Grammy Awards), where he serves as Trustee for the New York Chapter. In October 2020, he created and launched the academy's Black Music Collective, a group of music professionals dedicated to the inclusion, recognition and advancement of Black music and its creators within the Recording Academy and the music industry. In January 2021, Morales' work with music and social justice was recognized when he was selected as part of Billboard Magazine's Change Agent for 2020.

== Honors ==
In January 2004, Morales was voted number one A&R in the world by HitQuarters, a website that tracks the work of music executives. A month later, Morales created the Free Yayo campaign for 50 Cent. Eminem wore a shirt promoting the campaign during his performance at the 2004 Grammy Awards.

Morales is often called on by media outlets to speak as an expert on music.
