= Obie Trice =

American rapper (born 1977)

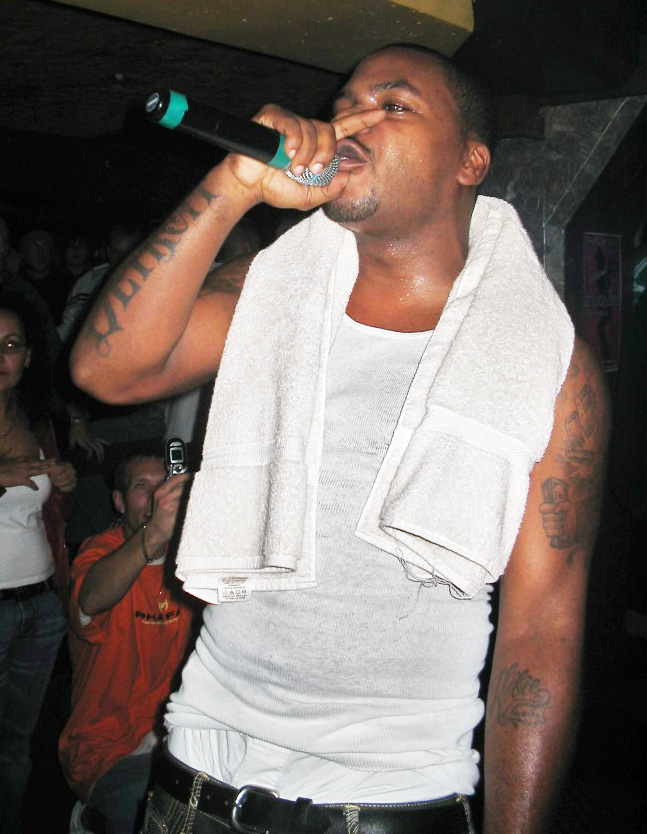
- Trice performing in 2006

Background information
- Born: Obie Trice III; November 14, 1977 (age 48); Detroit, Michigan, U.S.
- Genre: Midwestern hip-hop
- Occupations: Rapper; songwriter
- Years active: 1998–present
- Labels: Green Back; Black Market; Shady; Interscope
- Formerly of: The Frst
- Children: 1

Obie Trice III (born November 14, 1977) is an American rapper. He began his career in 1998, and two years later, he signed with fellow Detroit rapper Eminem's Shady Records, an imprint of Interscope Records to release his first two studio albums, Cheers (2003) and Second Round's on Me (2006). Both peaked within the top ten of the Billboard 200, while the former was supported by the singles "Got Some Teeth" and the Dr. Dre–produced "The Set Up (You Don’t Know)" (featuring Nate Dogg). Upon leaving the label, Trice formed his own record label, Black Market Entertainment, to self-release his next albums: Bottoms Up (2012), The Hangover (2015) and The Fifth (2019).

== Biography ==
Obie Trice III was born and raised on the west side of Detroit, Michigan, by his mother Eleanor Trice, along with three brothers. He is of African-American and German descent. Trice was given a karaoke machine by his mother when he was 11 and he used it to rhyme over instrumentals from artists such as N.W.A. By the age of 14, he was attending rap battle gatherings around Detroit, including the Hip Hop Shop, where he and his friends would go on Saturday afternoons. The battles were hosted by Proof from D12. Positive response from watchers encouraged Trice to get into rap music seriously.

Trice was calling himself "Obie 1" at that time as a pun on the Star Wars character Obi-Wan Kenobi, but before Proof introduced him at the Hip Hop Shop, he asked Trice his real name and introduced him as "Obie Trice", which remains his rap name. Trice was introduced to Eminem through D12 member Bizarre. Later, Trice's manager arranged for him to have dinner and go to a Kid Rock party with Eminem.

== Career ==
=== Shady Records (2000–2002) ===
Trice signed to Shady Records in 2000. He created a freestyle skit on the D12 album Devil's Night, following up with an intro snippet in Eminem's The Eminem Show lead single "Without Me", as well as the song "Drips". Later in 2002, Trice rapped on songs for the 8 Mile soundtrack, and also had a cameo appearance in the film as a rapper in a parking lot.

=== Cheers (2003–2004) ===
Trice's debut album, Cheers, was released on September 23, 2003, with its first single "Got Some Teeth" being well received on radio in a number of countries. "Got Some Teeth" peaked at number 54 on the Billboard Hot 100, and peaked within the top ten of the charts in Belgium (Flanders), Denmark, Ireland, New Zealand, and the United Kingdom. In the latter country, "Got Some Teeth" debuted and peaked at number eight on the UK Singles Chart in October 2003. He also released the singles "The Set Up" and "Don't Come Down". The album consists of 17 tracks with production from Eminem, Dr. Dre, Timbaland, Mike Elizondo, Emile, Fredwreck and Mr. Porter. Artists featured on Cheers include Busta Rhymes, Eminem, 50 Cent, Lloyd Banks, Dr. Dre, Nate Dogg, D12, Tony Yayo, and Timbaland. The album was eventually certified Gold by the RIAA. Trice also featured on the track Hennessey on Tupac Shakur's posthumous album Loyal To The Game.

=== Second Round's on Me and shooting (2005–2007) ===
In 2005, Trice began work on his second album, entitled Second Round's on Me. The album was released on August 15, 2006. Following the release of Second Round's on Me, he released a mixtape called Bar Shots with G-Unit's DJ Whoo Kid.

Shortly after his label-mate Proof was shot to death in a Detroit nightclub on April 11, 2006, a song emerged on the mixtape circuit called "Ride Wit Me". The song was dedicated to Proof. Trice made a speech at Proof's funeral, addressing the problem of black-on-black violence:

I want to talk to those coming up in the 'hood, coming up in the struggle. We're killing each other, and it's about nothing. Nothing. Nothing. We're all dying... over nothing.

In the single "Cry Now" from his second album, Trice addresses his shooting, as well as Eminem's rumored retirement, referenced with the following line, "Rock City is my voice / The white boy has stepped down / So I will accept the crown." Trice also addresses the shooting in the song "Pistol Pistol (Remix)" from the album Eminem Presents: The Re-Up claiming he's after revenge, "I solemnly swear on my daughters tears/The nigga that got him in the head will feel it before the year ends / Hope you inconspicuous my friend / 'Cause once the word get back ya in a world of sin / Bullets will hurtle at him for tryin to murder what been determined as the first solo African" and later "I'm so sincere you seein' a hearse this year / it's not a verse it's curse for burstin' what's on ya person". He has since given insight as to why he feels the shooting occurred, and has labeled it "haterism", as well as a bad mind state by saying, "it's a lot of do-or-die type individuals. They want to get that plug and there's really more to the game than they think it is [...] it's competition on a real vicious level."

=== Departure from Shady Records (2008–2009) ===
In June 2008, Obie Trice departed from Shady Records due to concern that he was not being promoted properly. Contrary to public belief at the time of the announcement, Trice did not have a falling out with Eminem or Dr. Dre. Both contributed vocals and production to Trice's upcoming album. A misunderstanding was made where it was believed he was attacking the label and Eminem on a single titled "The Giant"; however, this was quickly dismissed.

=== Special Reserve (2009–2010) ===
On December 15, 2009, a compilation album, Special Reserve, by Obie Trice and MoSS, the first producer of DJ Premier's "Works of Mart" production company, was released. The album is a collection of eleven of Trice's tracks recorded with MoSS from 1997 to 2000. The album served as a preface to his next album, "Bottoms Up".

=== Move to Black Market Entertainment, Bottoms Up, The Hangover and The Fifth, getting signed to Greenback Records (2010–present) ===
In 2010, Rap Basement reported that Obie Trice would launch his own independent music label, Black Market Entertainment. The label would be owned by Universal. On May 4, he confirmed that Eminem would be a featured guest artist on his upcoming album, Bottoms Up. On August 24, 2010, he released the single "My Time 2011" via Myspace; the track was produced by Geno XO. The music video was released on March 22, 2011; footage for the video was filmed at the Black Market Ent. Launch Party.

In April 2011, Trice released another single called "Learn to Love". It was a remixed version of the song "Haters" from his Bar Shots mixtape. That August, Trice tweeted the release date for Bottoms Up, initially planned for October 25. The first official single, "Battle Cry" featuring Adrian Rezza and produced by Lucas Rezza was released on iTunes on August 23.

On April 3, 2012, Bottoms Up was released. On May 7, Trice released a new song from his upcoming mixtape The Hangover titled "Get Rich Die Tryin" featuring Bilal. In an interview with HipHopDX that August, Trice announced that he was working on an album that would also be also titled The Hangover, which features production by Warren G. On June 15, 2015, Trice released the single "Good Girls" which would appear on The Hangover. The track was produced by the Grammy award-winning producer Magnedo7, who was one of the producers of Eminem's seventh studio album, Recovery. The album was released on August 7.

In a 2016 interview with Mr. Wavvy, Trice announced that he was already working on his fifth studio album, which he planned to releasing later in the year. Additionally, he revealed plans of a box set that included all four of his previous studio albums, along with previously unreleased tour footage. On August 23, 2019, his fifth album aptly named The Fifth was released. It includes guest appearances from Magnedo7, Directorkasper, Xzibit, and others.

On December 10, 2019, Obie Trice released a diss track called "Spanky Hayes" against Nick Cannon after Cannon released two diss tracks against Eminem. In the track, Trice was rapping over the instrumental of "30 Something" by Jay-Z. On December 16, Trice released a second diss track against Cannon called "Spanky Hayes 2" and under original production by Dubmuzik, who has produced for Trice in the past. In the diss track, he also calls out Suge Knight for calling Cannon "the new 2Pac" on the latter's first diss track against Eminem.

On September 14, 2025, Obie Trice shared a video on X (Twitter) of Conor McGregor announcing about Trice officially being signed with McGregor's record label Greenback Records.

== Personal life ==
Trice's first child, a daughter, was born in 1998. He has credited her birth as motivation for him to get serious with music.

On April 22, 2011, Trice met with Michigan State Senator Virgil Smith Jr. to discuss providing local artists with entertainment venues.

=== Legal issues ===
On December 31, 2005, Trice's car was shot six times and while driving on the Lodge Expressway by Wyoming Avenue in Detroit; one of the bullets penetrated his head. Trice was able to drive off the expressway, where his girlfriend waved down the police. He was taken to Providence Hospital and released later that day. Doctors contemplated whether to remove the bullet. As it was too dangerous to operate, the bullet is still lodged in his skull.

TMZ reported on December 6, 2019, that Trice was arrested for shooting his girlfriend's son. On July 8, 2020, Trice was sentenced to 90 days in the Oakland County Jail in Michigan from charges related to the shooting.

On June 16, 2022, Trice was arrested and jailed after an arraignment in District Court in Bloomfield Hills, Michigan, on a charge of using a telephone to harass or threaten someone. Soon after, he posted the $10,000 bond in the case.

== Discography ==
Studio albums

- Cheers (2003)
- Second Round's on Me (2006)
- Bottoms Up (2012)
- The Hangover (2015)
- The Fifth (2019)

Mixtapes

- The Bar Is Open (with DJ Green Lantern) (2003)
- Bar Shots (hosted by DJ Whoo Kid) (2006)
- The Most Under Rated (hosted by DJ Whoo Kid) (2007)
- Watch the Chrome (hosted by DJ Whoo Kid) (2012)

Compilation albums

- Special Reserve (with MoSS) (2009)

Collaboration albums

- Eminem Presents: The Re-Up (with Shady Records) (2006)
- Shady XV (with Shady Records) (2014)
