= Cheers (Obie Trice album) =

2003 studio album

Studio album by Obie Trice
- Released: September 23, 2003
- Genre: Hip-hop
- Length: 74:27
- Labels: Shady, Interscope
- Producers: Eminem; Denaun Porter; DJ Green Lantern; DJ Muggs; Dr. Dre; Emile; Fredwreck; Jeff Bass; Luis Resto; Mike Elizondo; Timbaland

Obie Trice chronology
| Cheers (2003) | Second Round's on Me (2006) |

Singles from Cheers
- 1. "Got Some Teeth" Released: August 12, 2003; 2. "Shit Hits the Fan" Released: November 3, 2003; 3. "The Set Up" Released: January 13, 2004; 4. "Don't Come Down" Released: 2004

Cheers is the debut album by the American rapper Obie Trice. It was released on September 23, 2003, by Shady Records and Interscope Records. Eminem served as the executive producer for this album. This album serves as Trice's first release from Shady Records since being signed in 2000. The album was certified Gold by the RIAA.

== Production ==
The standard edition of the album consisted of seventeen tracks; Eminem served as executive producer and handled most of the audio production by himself. Additional audio production was provided by Denaun Porter, Dr. Dre, Emile, Fredwreck, Jeff Bass, Luis Resto, Mike Elizondo and Timbaland. The bonus tracks "8 Miles" and "Synopsis" had their audio production handled by DJ Green Lantern and DJ Muggs, respectively. Featured artists on Cheers include Eminem, Nate Dogg, Timbaland, Lloyd Banks, 50 Cent, Dr. Dre, D12 and Busta Rhymes.

== Content ==
The title track celebrates Obie's debut into the rap community. Topics Obie has touched on this album include his life on the streets of Detroit, problems with his mother, relationships with women and not forgetting his friends after making it into the mainstream.

=== Diss songs ===
"Shit Hits the Fan"

The track "Shit Hits the Fan" is a track which insults Ja Rule. Examples of disses from Dr. Dre in the track are: "This little nigga, Ja Rule, Talking bout he's gonna slap me, Nigga please, you gotta jump and swing up to hit me at the knees." At the end of the song, Obie spoke over the beat telling Ja Rule to, "Go behind all the gangsta's you want. Matter of fact get every gangsta from every hood in the United States of America to back you. Ain't nobody reppin' with you, you can't see that?" This was intended to mock Ja Rule's street credibility, declaring that no one was backing him again and that he "fell off."

"We All Die One Day"

The track "We All Die One Day" is a diss to Benzino and The Source. Examples from Lloyd Banks include a subliminal shot at Ja Rule and Irv Gotti like, 'Your boss and your captain soft'. Eminem dissed The Source with lines like, 'We burn Source covers like fuckin' Cypress Hill'.

"Outro"

The track "Outro", which features D12 in the song, was a diss to Murder Inc. Records and Benzino.

== Artwork and packaging ==
The album's title is a homage to the long running NBC sitcom of the same name, and the album cover features a logo similar to that used on the show.

== Reception ==
=== Commercial ===
The album debuted at number five on the Billboard 200 and number three on the Top R&B/Hip-Hop Albums with 226,000 copies sold in its first week. It went on to be certified Gold in the United States, Australia, New Zealand and the United Kingdom.

=== Critical ===
Professional ratings
Aggregate scores
| Source | Rating |
|---|---|
| Metacritic | 73/100 |
Review scores
| Source | Rating |
| AllMusic | 4/5 stars |
| HipHopDX | 4/5 stars |
| PopMatters | Mixed |
| RapReviews | 8.5/10 |
| Rolling Stone | 4/5 stars |
| The Situation | 3.5/5 stars |
| UKMix | 4/5 stars |
| USA Today | 3.5/4 stars |
| The Village Voice | C+ |

Cheers garnered generally positive reviews from music critics. At Metacritic, which assigns a normalized rating out of 100 to reviews from mainstream critics, the album received an average score of 73, based on 12 reviews, which indicates "generally favorable reviews".

AllMusic's Jason Birchmeier said, "Cheers boasts 74 straight minutes of inventive production, original ideas, thought-out lyrics, and straight-up MCing -- even if it lacks outright hits like "In da Club" or "Lose Yourself." So cheers, indeed -- to Trice, that is -- because his debut is quite an accomplishment and deserves accolade, even if it's not a commercial juggernaut like its fellow Shady releases." J-23 of HipHopDX praised the production from Dr. Dre, Timbaland and Eminem, Obie's "raw and abrasive" delivery having "flawless execution" and working well alongside the guest artists that help elevate the record despite being unnecessary at points, concluding that: "Nevertheless, Cheers needs to be saluted. [It is] an excellent debut for Obie and he finds a great balance of radio friendly raps and hardcore hip-hop. While he isn't going to move 50 numbers, Cheers is the superior album. I'll drink to that." Melisa Tang of The Situation also gave praise to the beats for giving support to Obie's "skillful and witty flow" throughout the track listing but felt they only work half the time, concluding that: "Overall, Obie Trice has not failed to deliver. There is no doubt that he has the talent to succeed in the rap game, but the real test will be in winning over the haters, who constantly accuse him of riding on Eminem's phenomenal worldwide success." Jon Caramanica, writing for Rolling Stone, commended Obie for utilizing his "workmanlike emphasis of craft over style" when delivering humorous tracks like "Hoodrats" and "Got Some Teeth" but was more interested in his vitriol side on "Shit Hits the Fan" and "We All Die One Day", saying they "distract from his otherwise almost demure display of skill." PopMatters contributor Cynthia Fuchs felt the record was overlong and repetitive with its "misogynistic malice" and "hood life" indulgence but gave credit to tracks like "Oh!" and "The Set Up" for telling significant street tales and "Don't Come Down" and "Follow My Life" for being "compelling" tributes dedicated to Obie's mother.

== Track listing ==
| No. | Title | Writer(s) | Producer(s) | Length |
|---|---|---|---|---|
| 1. | "Average Man" | Obie Trice; Marshall Mathers; Luis Resto; Steven King | Eminem; Luis Resto^{[a]} | 4:16 |
| 2. | "Cheers" | Trice; Mathers; Resto; King | Eminem; Resto^{[a]} | 3:34 |
| 3. | "Got Some Teeth" | Trice; Mathers; Resto; King; Anne Dudley; Malcolm McLaren; Trevor Horn | Eminem; Resto^{[a]} | 3:47 |
| 4. | "Lady" (featuring Eminem) | Trice; Mathers; Resto | Eminem; Resto^{[a]} | 4:45 |
| 5. | "Don't Come Down" | Trice; Mathers; Emile Haynie; Resto; King; W. Rineheart | Emile; Eminem^{[b]} | 5:11 |
| 6. | "The Set Up (You Don't Know)" (featuring Nate Dogg) | Trice; Nathaniel Hale; Andre Young; Mike Elizondo | Dr. Dre; Mike Elizondo^{[b]} | 3:13 |
| 7. | "Bad Bitch" (featuring Timbaland) | Trice; Timothy Mosley | Timbaland | 4:09 |
| 8. | "Shit Hits the Fan" (featuring Dr. Dre and Eminem) | Trice; Mathers; Young; Elizondo | Dr. Dre; Elizondo^{[b]} | 4:53 |
| 9. | "Follow My Life" | Trice; Mathers; Farid Nassar; Resto; Ernie Isley; Marvin Isley; O'Kelly Isley, Jr.; Ronald Isley; Chris Jasper; Christopher Wallace | Fredwreck; Eminem^{[b]} | 3:55 |
| 10. | "We All Die One Day" (featuring Lloyd Banks, Eminem and 50 Cent) | Trice; Christopher Lloyd; Mathers; Curtis Jackson | Eminem | 5:29 |
| 11. | "Spread Yo Shit" (featuring Kon Artis of D12) | Trice; Denaun Porter; Resto; King | Mr. Porter | 4:03 |
| 12. | "Look in My Eyes" (featuring Nate Dogg) | Trice; Mathers; Hale; Young; Elizondo | Dr. Dre; Elizondo^{[b]} | 4:50 |
| 13. | "Hands on You" (featuring Eminem) | Trice; Mathers; Resto | Eminem; Resto^{[a]} | 5:12 |
| 14. | "Hoodrats" | Trice; Mathers; Haynie; Resto | Emile; Eminem^{[b]} | 4:12 |
| 15. | "Oh!" (featuring Busta Rhymes) | Trice; Mathers; Trevor Smith; Elizondo | Dr. Dre; Elizondo^{[b]} | 4:30 |
| 16. | "Never Forget Ya" | Trice; Mathers; Jeff Bass; Resto; King | Eminem; Jeff Bass^{[b]} | 4:27 |
| 17. | "Outro" (featuring Eminem, Swifty McVay, Kuniva, Proof and Bizarre of D12) | Trice; Mathers; Ondre Moore; Von Carlisle; DeShaun Holton; Rufus Johnson; Resto; King | Eminem; Resto^{[a]} | 4:02 |

Bonus tracks
| No. | Title | Producer(s) | Length |
|---|---|---|---|
| 18. | "8 Miles" | DJ Muggs | 3:57 |
| 19. | "Synopsis" | DJ Green Lantern | 1:18 |

Leftover tracks

- "The Set Up (You Don't Know) (Remix)" (featuring Lloyd Banks, Jadakiss and Redman)
- "Rap Name"

Notes

- ^{^[a]} signifies an additional producer.
- ^{^[b]} signifies a co-producer.
- "We All Die One Day" contains background vocals by Tony Yayo
- "Spread Yo Shit" contains additional vocals by Proof
- "Never Forget Ya" contains additional vocals by 87 Ent. Definite

Sample credits

- "Cheers" contains elements of "Love Me" by Eminem, Obie Trice and 50 Cent
- "Got Some Teeth" contains resung elements from "Without Me" by Eminem
- "Don't Come Down" samples from "When You Believe" by Quincy Jones and Táta Vega
- "Follow My Life" samples from "Big Poppa" by The Notorious B.I.G.
- "Spread Yo Shit" samples from "Blow My Buzz" by D12
- "Outro" contains resung elements from "When the Music Stops" by D12

== Personnel ==
Adapted from the Cheers liner notes.

Instrumentation

- Jeff Bass – guitar (16)
- Mike Dinkins – bass guitar (8)
- Mike Elizondo – keyboards (6, 8, 12, 15)
- Fredwreck – guitar, keyboards (9)
- Steve King – guitar (1, 2, 11, 16), bass guitar (3)
- Luis Resto – bass guitar (2), keyboards (1–4, 6, 8–11, 13, 15, 16)

Technical

- Mike Strange – engineering (1–6, 8–17)
- Mauricio "Veto" Iragorri – engineering (6, 8, 12, 15)
- Jimmy Douglas – engineering, mixing (7)
- Steve King – engineering (1–6, 8–17), mixing (1–5, 9–11, 13, 14, 16, 17)
- Rich Hunt – engineering (3, 12, 15), assistant engineer (8, 9, 11, 13, 15, 17)
- Demacio Castellon – assistant engineer (7)
- Rouble Kapoor – assistant engineer (6, 8, 12, 15)
- Dr. Dre – mixing (6, 8, 12, 15)
- Eminem – mixing (1–5, 9–11, 13, 14, 16, 17)
- Timbaland – mixing (7)
- Brian Gardner – mastering

Imagery

- Slang Inc. – art direction and design
- Jonathan Mannion – photography

== Charts ==
=== Weekly charts ===
| Chart (2003) | Peak position |
|---|---|
| Australian Albums (ARIA) | 24 |
| Canadian Albums (Billboard) | 2 |
| Danish Albums (Hitlisten) | 18 |
| Dutch Albums (Album Top 100) | 41 |
| French Albums (SNEP) | 35 |
| German Albums (Offizielle Top 100) | 63 |
| Irish Albums (IRMA) | 11 |
| Italian Albums (FIMI) | 58 |
| New Zealand Albums (RMNZ) | 10 |
| Norwegian Albums (VG-lista) | 16 |
| Scottish Albums (Official Charts) | 8 |
| Swedish Albums (Sverigetopplistan) | 25 |
| Swiss Albums (Schweizer Hitparade) | 36 |
| UK Albums (Official Charts) | 11 |
| US Billboard 200 | 5 |
| US Top R&B/Hip-Hop Albums (Billboard) | 3 |

=== Year-end charts ===
| Chart (2003) | Position |
|---|---|
| UK Albums (OCC) | 129 |
| US Billboard 200 | 123 |
| US Top R&B/Hip-Hop Albums (Billboard) | 83 |

== Certifications ==
| Region | Certification | Certified units/sales |
|---|---|---|
| Australia (ARIA) | Gold | 35,000^{^} |
| New Zealand (RMNZ) | Gold | 7,500^{^} |
| United Kingdom (BPI) | Gold | 100,000^{^} |
| United States (RIAA) | Gold | 500,000^{^} |
^{^} Shipments figures based on certification alone.
