= Mosh (song) =

Promotional single by Eminem

from the album Encore
- Released: October 20, 2004
- Genre: Political hip hop
- Length: 5:17
- Label: Shady; Aftermath; Interscope
- Songwriters: Marshall Mathers; Andre Young; Mike Elizondo; Mark Batson; Chris Pope
- Producers: Dr. Dre; Mark Batson

Eminem singles chronology
| "Just Lose It" (2004) | "Mosh" (2004) | "Encore" (2004) |

Music video
- Mosh on YouTube

"Mosh" is a protest song by Eminem from his fifth studio album, Encore. The song debuted on Eminem's official mixtape, Shade 45: Sirius Bizness, on October 20, 2004, which has Eminem standing in front of the White House holding an American flag on its cover. Days later, on October 26, one week before the 2004 presidential election, a promotional video created by Guerrilla News Network debuted on the company's website. The video aired on MTV the following day and immediately went to the top of the channel's "hot video" charts. The song, released to encourage voters to vote George W. Bush out of office, did not chart on the Billboard Hot 100 or Hot R&B/Hip-Hop Songs because it was released only as a promotional video and album track.

== Music video ==
The video, mostly animated and directed by Ian Inaba of the Guerrilla News Network, portrays Eminem as a powerful rebellious figure who, just by using his voice and music, can mobilize people who are fed up with the president. With his following uniformly dressed in dark hoodies, the group looks to be storming toward the White House but ends up signing up to vote. At the same time in the song, Eminem talks about the people assembling to disarm what he calls the real weapon of mass destruction: George W. Bush. The video ends with a black screen and the words "Vote November 2".

== Critical reception ==
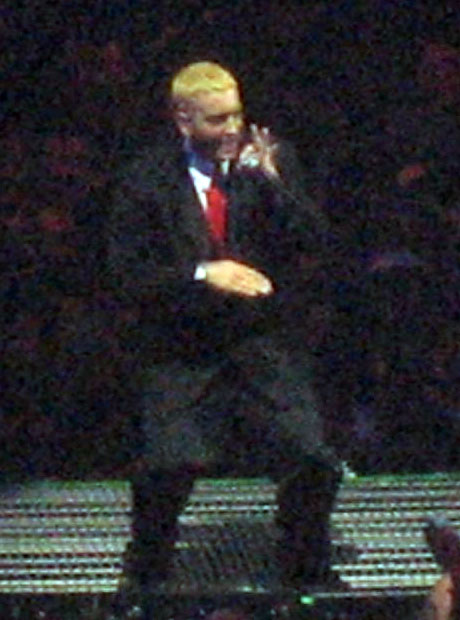
Eminem on the Anger Management Tour promoting Encore

Stephen Thomas Erlewine of AllMusic highlighted the song. Entertainment Weekly wrote a mixed description, saying the song "was nothing less than the sound of America's favorite Caucasian rapper at his most intense and focused. Protest songs made a comeback this year, but none captured doom and apocalypse the way 'Mosh' so brilliantly did. Eminem is still a narcissist, of course — he wants us to follow him to liberation, or at least to the voting booth — but the power of 'Mosh' made you forgive his never-ending self-absorption" and called the song itself an anomaly. DX magazine wrote that "he (Eminem) turns political and blatantly lashes out at Bush on 'Mosh' (sure to cause some repercussions from politicians considering his visibility)." Pitchfork Media wrote a mixed review: "'Mosh'—sadly, not yet completely past its sell-by date—seems more like a plodding dirge here among the spry string of tracks that surround it." NME magazine wrote a favorable review: "And then there's 'Mosh'. Oh boy, there's 'Mosh'. --- Should 'Encore' prove to be a swansong, then 'Mosh' is its blaze of glory, a scalding assault on the Bush regime that hits all the harder for its arriving days too late. The rapper sounds absolutely livid as he mounts a stealthy assault on the Prez that swells with density and rage over its five minutes until fire and brimstone is raining down on the shitwit Texan's perpetually befuddled head. Although you might argue that everything Eminem says is inherently political through the sheer numbers that he reaches and the sheer anti-social nature of most of what he espouses, this is a different kettle of politicised fish entirely. "If it rains, let it rain/Yeah, the wetter the better/They ain't gonna stop us, they can't/We're stronger now more than ever", he rages with a demented fervour that makes Rage Against the Machine sound like Belle & Sebastian. And if that non-specific rabble-rousery is a little on the vague side, the likes of "Stomp, push, shove, mush/Fuck Bush until they bring our troops home" should make it crystal clear. On a more base level, it's fucking fantastic to jump up and down and bang your head to, which is the level where politics and pop most effectively connect." Steve Jones of USA Today said that the song "[lambastes] President Bush and his war policies."

The A.V. Club wrote of the song: "[Eminem] stops attacking scapegoats and straw men and finally goes after the people who actually wield power. Over Dr. Dre's apocalyptic production—all rain-clouds and thunderclaps—Eminem launches into a searing, overtly emotional attack on President Bush and his administration's bloodlust and misplaced priorities. Eminem has always been angry, but his anger has never before been this righteous, focused, or plugged in to what matters in American life." Los Angeles Times was somewhat positive too: he stated that Eminem "catches us off-guard with eloquent political reflections in 'Mosh,' his equivalent of Bob Dylan's "The Times They Are A-Changin'." While Eminem's rap doesn't have the timelessness or literary aspirations of the Dylan song, it hits with the visceral charge and topical urgency of the best rap. Lashing out at various social injustices, he leads a legion of young followers toward what appears to be the kind of violent rebellion one might expect in hard-core rock and rap. Instead, as the video for 'Mosh' shows, their charge is to the voting booth." The Austin Chronicle called the song a "potent anti-Bush rant". SPIN was a bit positive: "The seething anti-Bush single 'Mosh' may not have brought droves of Eminem acolytes to the polls last November, but it suggests that Em—like fellow potty-mouth-turned activist Howard Stern—realizes that his gifts have uses beyond FCC-baiting and fart jokes."

RapReviews was also unimpressed: "'Mosh' suffers from a similar stigma: a disconcerted, ADD Eminem who can't seem to lock down his lyrics." Robert Christgau of Rolling Stone wrote: "[Was Encore] a feint designed to double the wallop of 'Mosh,' which signaled a Marshall Mathers gone political — too late to help his candidate, but, be real, the Muse doesn't follow a schedule." The Guardian was positive: "Finally, there is Mosh, the anti-war, anti-Bush track "leaked" just before the election. It offers both the best lyric Eminem has ever written and the one moment on the album where the repetitious production style works, providing a suitably relentless basis for his quickfire hectoring. That Mosh seemingly did nothing to affect the election's outcome is something of a double-edged sword." Franklin Soults of The Boston Phoenix was a bit negative toward the song: "In the latest Rolling Stone, Eminem says he hopes his galvanizing anti-Bush single "Mosh" wasn't "too little, too late." Well, it was, and this puke-and-shit-stained album makes it even less likely that sympathizers who read Rolling Stone or the Phoenix will reach out for it anyway"; he did state, however, that the album had "several moments more consistently remarkable than 'Mosh'", including "Mockingbird" and "Like Toy Soldiers".

The New York Times noted that this song "gained notoriety for its anti-Bush lyrics, but Eminem sounds nearly as long-winded as the politicians he's excoriating." Shaking Through called this song "political screed." Slant Magazine called it "a protest song originally intended solely for online promotion but which quickly earned its status as the album's official second single. 'Mosh' is not only a worthy follow-up to 'Lose Yourself,' it had the potential to shepherd thousands of young, seemingly apathetic voters to the polls on Election Day—had it not been released after almost every registration deadline in the country." The publisher added that the song "[matched] America's angriest pop voice with America's most righteous pastime: Bush-bashing. George W. Bush and Eminem might seem like unlikely foes—after all, the enemy of your enemy is your friend, right?—but Eminem is the poster boy for pushing the limits of the 1st Amendment, and bashing the President is currently the most vilified form of free speech in the country, so who better to champion the cause? 'Maybe this is God just sayin' we're responsible/For this monster, this coward that we have empowered,' he spits rhythmically atop a sturdy, dirge-like beat." Stylus Magazine was the most negative of all: "Add [in] Em's brand new tendency to bite himself, and you've actually got a pretty airtight case for playing the career suicide card."

== See also ==
- List of anti-war songs
