= List of European number-one hits of 2004 =

This is a list of the European Hot 100 Singles and European Top 100 Albums number ones of 2004, as published by Billboard magazine.

== Chart history ==
Key
†	Indicates best-performing single and album of 2004

Issue date	Song	Artist	Album	Artist	Ref.
7 January	"Shut Up"	The Black Eyed Peas	Life for Rent	Dido	
14 January	"Shut Up"	The Black Eyed Peas	Life for Rent	Dido	
21 January	"Shut Up"	The Black Eyed Peas	Life for Rent	Dido	
28 January	"Shut Up"	The Black Eyed Peas	Life for Rent	Dido	
4 February	"Shut Up"	The Black Eyed Peas	Talkie Walkie	Air	
11 February	"Shut Up"	The Black Eyed Peas	Life for Rent	Dido	
18 February	"Shut Up"	The Black Eyed Peas	Feels Like Home †	Norah Jones	
25 February	"Shut Up"	The Black Eyed Peas	Feels Like Home †	Norah Jones	
3 March	"Shut Up"	The Black Eyed Peas	Feels Like Home †	Norah Jones	
10 March	"Toxic"	Britney Spears	Feels Like Home †	Norah Jones	
17 March	"Toxic"	Britney Spears	Feels Like Home †	Norah Jones	
24 March	"Yeah!"	Usher featuring Lil Jon and Ludacris	Patience	George Michael	
31 March	"Yeah!"	Usher featuring Lil Jon and Ludacris	Patience	George Michael	
7 April	"Yeah!"	Usher featuring Lil Jon and Ludacris	Anastacia	Anastacia	
14 April	"Yeah!"	Usher featuring Lil Jon and Ludacris	Anastacia	Anastacia	
21 April	"Yeah!"	Usher featuring Lil Jon and Ludacris	Anastacia	Anastacia	
28 April	"Yeah!"	Usher featuring Lil Jon and Ludacris	Anastacia	Anastacia	
5 May	"Yeah!"	Usher featuring Lil Jon and Ludacris	Anastacia	Anastacia	
12 May	"Yeah!"	Usher featuring Lil Jon and Ludacris	Anastacia	Anastacia	
19 May	"Fuck It (I Don't Want You Back)"	Eamon	Anastacia	Anastacia	
26 May	"Fuck It (I Don't Want You Back)"	Eamon	So-Called Chaos	Alanis Morissette	
2 June	"Fuck It (I Don't Want You Back)"	Eamon	Under My Skin	Avril Lavigne	
9 June	"I Don't Wanna Know"	Mario Winans featuring Enya and P. Diddy	Under My Skin	Avril Lavigne	
16 June	"Dragostea Din Tei" †	O-Zone	Under My Skin	Avril Lavigne	
23 June	"Dragostea Din Tei" †	O-Zone	To the 5 Boroughs	Beastie Boys	
30 June	"Dragostea Din Tei" †	O-Zone	Once	Nightwish	
7 July	"Dragostea Din Tei" †	O-Zone	The Cure	The Cure	
14 July	"Dragostea Din Tei" †	O-Zone	Once	Nightwish	
21 July	"Dragostea Din Tei" †	O-Zone	Anastacia	Anastacia	
28 July	"Dragostea Din Tei" †	O-Zone	Anastacia	Anastacia	
4 August	"Dragostea Din Tei" †	O-Zone	Live in Hyde Park	Red Hot Chili Peppers	
11 August	"Dragostea Din Tei" †	O-Zone	Live in Hyde Park	Red Hot Chili Peppers	
18 August	"Dragostea Din Tei" †	O-Zone	Anastacia	Anastacia	
25 August	"Dragostea Din Tei" †	O-Zone	Anastacia	Anastacia	
1 September	"Dragostea Din Tei" †	O-Zone	Anastacia	Anastacia	
8 September	"Obsesión"	Aventura	Medúlla	Björk	
15 September	"Obsesión"	Aventura	Anastacia	Anastacia	
22 September	"Obsesión"	Aventura	Anastacia	Anastacia	
29 September	"Obsesión"	Aventura	Room Service	Bryan Adams	
6 October	"Obsesión"	Aventura	Reise, Reise	Rammstein	
13 October	"Radio"	Robbie Williams	Around the Sun	R.E.M.	
20 October	"Obsesión"	Aventura	Around the Sun	R.E.M.	
27 October	"Call on Me"	Eric Prydz	Greatest Hits	Robbie Williams	
3 November	"Call on Me"	Eric Prydz	Greatest Hits	Robbie Williams	
10 November	"Just Lose It"	Eminem	Greatest Hits	Robbie Williams	
17 November	"Just Lose It"	Eminem	Greatest Hits	Robbie Williams	
24 November	"Lose My Breath"	Destiny's Child	Encore	Eminem	
1 December	"Lose My Breath"	Destiny's Child	How to Dismantle an Atomic Bomb	U2	
8 December	"Lose My Breath"	Destiny's Child	How to Dismantle an Atomic Bomb	U2	
15 December	"Lose My Breath"	Destiny's Child	How to Dismantle an Atomic Bomb	U2	
22 December	"Do They Know It's Christmas?"	Band Aid 20	Greatest Hits	Robbie Williams	
29 December	"Do They Know It's Christmas?"	Band Aid 20	Greatest Hits	Robbie Williams	
