= Hoodmorning (No Typo): Candy Coronas =

Mixtape by Game
- Released: July 29, 2011
- Recorded: 2011
- Genre: Hip hop
- Length: 1:14:22
- Label: BWS; SkeeTV
- Producer: Boi-1da; Mars; DJ Khalil; Lifted; Che Vicious; Terrace Martin; Sonny Alves; Gun Roulet; Point Guard; Rance; Cool & Dre; Trey Songz; Jim Jonsin

Game chronology
Purp & Patron (2011)	Hoodmorning (No Typo): Candy Coronas (2011)	The R.E.D. Album (2011)

Hoodmorning (No Typo): Candy Coronas is the twelfth mixtape by West Coast rapper Game released as a free online download on July 29, 2011. The mixtape is hosted by DJ Skee. The mixtape includes all new tracks and was released in promotion to Game's upcoming The R.E.D. Album. Production is handled by Boi-1da, DJ Khalil, Cool & Dre, Trey Songz, Terrace Martin, Jim Jonsin and more. Features on the mixtape include Snoop Dogg, Dr. Dre, Lil Wayne, Gucci Mane, B.o.B, Wiz Khalifa, Birdman, Trey Songz, Yelawolf and more.

== Track list ==
No.	Title	Producer(s)	Length
1.	"Hoodmorning"	Mars	3:27
2.	"Drug Test" (featuring Dr. Dre, Snoop Dogg and Sly Jordan)	DJ Khalil	2:29
3.	"Can You Believe It?" (featuring Lil Wayne and Birdman)	Lifted	3:38
4.	"Mr. West/Money & the Power"	Che Vicious	6:18
5.	"Monsters In My Head"	Boi-1da	3:39
6.	"Wow" (featuring Gucci Mane)	Mars	3:58
7.	"25 to Life"	Mars	3:27
8.	"Out of Towner"	Terrace Martin	3:31
9.	"Standin' on the Corner" (featuring B.o.B and Wiz Khalifa)	Sonny Alves; Gun Roulet	3:34
10.	"Grave Yard" (featuring Sam Hook)	Mars; Point Guard	3:11
11.	"The Town"	Mars; Rance	3:28
12.	"Uncle Otis"	Mars; Point Guard	3:22
13.	"Infrared"	Cool & Dre	4:32
14.	"Change Your Life" (featuring A.R., Nu Jerzey Devil, X.O., Toolez, TD, Payper, Famous Fresh, Compton Menace and Kanary Diamonds)	Mars	4:06
15.	"Red" (featuring Redman)	Cool & Dre	2:04
16.	"I'm On"	Mars	3:45
17.	"Ace of Spades" (featuring Joi Starr and Payper)	Mars	3:35
18.	"Fucked Up" (featuring Compton Menace)	Mars	3:44
19.	"She Wanna Have My Baby" (featuring Trey Songz)	Trey Songz	4:00
20.	"Rough" (featuring Yelawolf)	Jim Jonsin	4:34
Total length:			1:14:22
