= When I'm Gone (Eminem song) =

Single by Eminem

from the album Curtain Call: The Hits
- Released: December 6, 2005
- Recorded: March 2004; October 7 – November 11, 2005
- Genre: Conscious hip hop
- Length: 4:41 (album version); 4:14 (radio edit)
- Label: Aftermath; Shady; Interscope
- Songwriters: Marshall Mathers; Luis Resto
- Producers: Eminem; Luis Resto

Eminem singles chronology
"Welcome 2 Detroit" (2005)	"When I'm Gone" (2005)	"Shake That" (2006)

Music video
- "When I'm Gone" on YouTube

"When I'm Gone" is a song by American rapper Eminem from his greatest hits album Curtain Call: The Hits (2005). It was released on December 6, 2005, the same day as the album was released, as the lead single.

"When I'm Gone" received mixed to negative reviews from music critics. The song charted at number eight on the U.S. Billboard Hot 100, number 22 on the Hot Rap Tracks chart, number four on the UK Singles Chart and one on the Australian ARIA Singles Chart, the latter being the only country where it peaked at number one.

== Background ==
“When I’m Gone” was written and released in 2005 by Shady Records, on the album Curtain Call: The Hits. It was thought at the time that this album would mark the beginning of an extended musical hiatus for Eminem, who had said "I'm at a point in my life right now where I feel like I don't know where my career is going...This is the reason that we called it Curtain Call, because this could be the final thing. We don't know."

The song was written in 2005, immediately after Eminem's first stint in rehab. Eminem said, "Coming out of rehab [...] gave me an incredible amount of writer’s block. Dre came into town, and we tried to work together to get a song for Curtain Call. [...] My mind was on block, like, I can’t write at all and there’s so much to say, how do I say it? “When I’m Gone” came at the very last minute."

The song's lyrics pertain to Eminem's life as a celebrity musician interfering with his family. Eminem uses imagery to evoke a feeling of sadness about his family falling apart.

The music video for the song was directed by Anthony Mandler. Tarick Salmaci, from the TV show The Contender, makes an appearance in the video with his wife.

== Critical reception ==
AllMusic wrote a mixed to positive overview: "There's the closing "When I'm Gone," a sentimental chapter in the Eminem domestic psychodrama that bears the unmistakable suggestion that Em is going away for a while. While it's not up to the standard of "Mockingbird," it is more fully realized than the two other new cuts here..." Pitchfork considered: "When I'm Gone" is an all desolate placeholder—lesser version of Eminem songs that already piss me off. "Gone" is the worst offender, yet another love letter from Em to daughter Hailie, it, like Encore's "Mockingbird", is heavy-handed and saccharine."

IGN also panned the single: "The latter, however, is another prime example of the beat dragging Eminem down. The sluggish, lumbering bump causes his lyrics to stumble and sound forced in their delivery. The heartfelt storyline would have been better served drenched in some warm, fuzzy, but ultimately mournful soul instead." NME called this song disappointing. Rolling Stone was similarly critical, describing the song as "recycled".

== Music video ==
The music video starts with Eminem rapping on a podium about his life at a Narcotics Anonymous meeting. He's at an open house where he completely ignores his daughter's creations but before he can see the error of his actions, it is too late. As he watches her walk away, he raps "Then turn right around in that song and tell her you love her/And put hands on her mother, who's a spitting image of her", feeling remorse for writing songs about being violent towards Kim, who is Hailie's mother, and wonders how he could be a good parent.

Then, he is confronted by his daughter piling boxes in front of the door to prevent him from leaving. He convinces his daughter to let him go but she insists to give him a necklace with her picture. He then finds himself in a hotel room and then on a stage where he raps. At the end of his performance on the stage, he finds his daughter has followed him and tells him of the divorce.

Afterwards, Eminem goes backstage as the "bad" Slim Shady and looks in a mirror. He then punches it as a way of "killing" Slim Shady; this is a reference to the cover of his 1997 extended play Slim Shady EP. He then finds himself back at home playing with his daughters on the swing. The video ends with him being applauded at the podium.

The video features actresses playing his daughter Hailie Jade and his ex-wife Kim, from whom Eminem was divorced when the song was released. Hailie's half sibling Stevie Laine Scott, Kim's child to another man, also appears in the video played by an actress near the end of the video. Eminem adopted Stevie and thinks of them as his own child. They're the younger kid on the swing, at the moment in the lyrics when he says, "Hailie just smiles and winks at her little sister". The scene where he performs onstage is the cover art for the single and Curtain Call album.

The music video was uploaded to YouTube in June 2009 and surpassed 1 billion views on the platform in June 2024, becoming Eminem's seventh music video to reach this feat on YouTube.

== Track listing ==
Digital download

No.	Title	Writer(s)	Producer(s)	Length
1.	"When I'm Gone" (explicit version)	Marshall Mathers; Luis Resto	Eminem; Luis Resto^{[a]}	4:41
2.	"Business" (explicit version)	Mathers; Andre Young; Mike Elizondo; Theron Feemster	Dr. Dre	4:11
3.	"When I'm Gone" (instrumental)	Mathers; Resto	Eminem; Resto^{[a]}	4:42
Total length:				13:34

UK CD single

No.	Title	Writer(s)	Producer(s)	Length
1.	"When I'm Gone" (explicit version)	Marshall Mathers; Luis Resto^{[a]}	Eminem; Luis Resto^{[a]}	4:41
2.	"Business" (explicit version)	Mathers; Andre Young; Mike Elizondo; Theron Feemster	Dr. Dre	4:11
3.	"When I'm Gone" (instrumental)	Mathers; Resto	Eminem; Resto^{[a]}	4:41
4.	"When I'm Gone" (video)			4:41
Total length:				17:24

German CD single

No.	Title	Writer(s)	Producer(s)	Length
1.	"When I'm Gone" (explicit version)	Marshall Mathers; Luis Resto^{[a]}	Eminem; Luis Resto^{[a]}	4:41
2.	"Business" (explicit version)	Mathers; Andre Young; Mike Elizondo; Theron Feemster	Dr. Dre	4:11
Total length:				8:52

Notes

- ^{^[a]} signifies an additional producer.

== Charts ==
=== Weekly charts ===
Chart (2005–06)	Peak position
Australia (ARIA)	1
Australian Urban (ARIA)	1
Austria (Ö3 Austria Top 40)	7
Belgium (Ultratop 50 Flanders)	8
Belgium (Ultratop 50 Wallonia)	26
Brazil (ABPD)	56
Canada (Nielsen SoundScan)	16
Canada CHR/Pop Top 30 (Radio & Records)	16
Eurochart Hot 100 (Billboard)	3
Finland (Suomen virallinen lista)	3
Germany (Official German Charts)	6
Greece (IFPI)	12
Ireland (IRMA)	5
Netherlands (Dutch Top 40)	6
Netherlands (Single Top 100)	3
New Zealand (RIANZ)	2
Norway (VG-lista)	4
Scottish Singles Sales (Official Charts)	3
Sweden (Sverigetopplistan)	5
Switzerland (Schweizer Hitparade)	7
UK Singles (Official Charts Company)	4
UK Hip Hop/R&B (Official Charts)	1
US Billboard Hot 100	8
US Hot R&B/Hip-Hop Songs (Billboard)	96
US Hot Rap Songs (Billboard)	22
US Pop Airplay (Billboard)	13
US Pop 100 (Billboard)	7

=== Year-end charts ===
Chart (2005)	Position
UK Singles (Official Charts Company)	115

Chart (2006)	Position
Australia (ARIA)	46
Austria (Ö3 Austria Top 40)	49
Belgium (Ultratop Flanders)	70
Germany (Official German Charts)	45
Netherlands (Dutch Top 40)	63
Netherlands (Single Top 100)	90
Sweden (Sverigetopplistan)	72
Switzerland (Schweizer Hitparade)	63
UK Singles (Official Charts Company)	154
US Billboard Hot 100	90

== Certifications ==
Certifications for When I'm Gone
Region	Certification	Certified units/sales
Australia (ARIA)	6× Platinum	420,000^{‡}
Austria (IFPI Austria)	Gold	15,000^{*}
Brazil (Pro-Música Brasil)	Platinum	60,000^{‡}
Denmark (IFPI Danmark)	Platinum	90,000^{‡}
Germany (BVMI)	Gold	150,000^{‡}
Italy (FIMI)	Gold	25,000^{‡}
New Zealand (RMNZ)	2× Platinum	60,000^{‡}
United Kingdom (BPI)	Platinum	600,000^{‡}
United States (RIAA)	5× Platinum	5,000,000^{‡}
United States (RIAA) Mastertone	Gold	500,000^{*}
^{*} Sales figures based on certification alone.^{‡} Sales+streaming figures based on certification alone.
