= Curtain Call: The Hits =

Greatest hits album by Eminem
- Released: December 6, 2005
- Recorded: July 1997 – November 2005
- Genres: Hip-hop; hardcore hip hop; horrorcore; comedy hip hop
- Length: 77:57
- Labels: Shady; Goliath; Aftermath; WEB; Interscope
- Producers: Eminem; Dr. Dre; Jeff & Marky Bass; Luis Resto; DJ Head; Mike Elizondo; The 45 King; Mel-Man

Eminem chronology
Encore (2004)	Curtain Call: The Hits (2005)	Relapse (2009)

Singles from Curtain Call: The Hits
- 1. "When I'm Gone" Released: December 6, 2005; 2. "Shake That" Released: January 17, 2006

Professional ratings
Review scores
Source	Rating
AllMusic	5/5 stars
Entertainment Weekly	A−
Entertainment.ie	4/5 stars
IGN	3.5/5 stars
The Independent	5/5 stars
The Irish Times	4/5 stars
NME	4/5 stars
Pitchfork	6.9/10
Rolling Stone	4/5 stars
Sputnikmusic	4/5 stars

Curtain Call: The Hits is the first greatest hits album by the American rapper Eminem. It was released on December 6, 2005, under Shady Records, Goliath Artists, Aftermath Entertainment, WEB Entertainment, and Interscope Records. The album collects Eminem's most popular singles, as well as three new songs: "Fack", "When I'm Gone", and "Shake That" featuring Nate Dogg. A live version of "Stan" performed with English singer-songwriter Elton John at the 43rd Grammy Awards is also included as a bonus track.

The album was certified Diamond in the United States on March 8, 2022, and quintuple platinum in New Zealand. It reached number one on several charts, including the US Billboard 200 and UK Albums Chart.

On July 11, 2022, Eminem announced a sequel to the album titled Curtain Call 2, which would contain material from his later work. It was released on August 5, 2022.

== Chart performance ==
Curtain Call: The Hits debuted at number one on the UK Albums Chart and Billboard 200, after two sales days, in a similar fashion to Eminem's previous album Encore. The album racked up first-week sales of nearly 441,000 and with close to 324,000 scans the second week for a two-week stay at number one. It slipped from number one to number four in its third week but surged 33 percent to finish with sales close to 430,000. The disc scored nearly 1.2 million scans in its first three weeks of release. It also gave Eminem his fifth straight number 1 album in the US and UK including the 8 Mile soundtrack. As of November 2013, the record had sold 3,782,000 copies in the United States. Curtain Call was later certified Diamond by the RIAA in the United States.

The album's two singles, "When I'm Gone" and "Shake That", peaked at numbers 8 and 6 respectively in the US Billboard Hot 100. Only "When I'm Gone" qualified for the charts in the UK, where it peaked at number 4.

In August 2017, the album was declared the longest-charting rap LP in the history of the Billboard 200. In August 2026, it became the first rap album in history to spend 800 weeks on the chart.

A clean version of the album is also available. It has 15 tracks with both "Intro" and "Fack" removed (due to the extreme sexual nature of the latter, and the former's connection to the song) and "My Name Is" put to track one. The tracks appear exactly how they appeared on the clean versions of their respective albums except for the song "Guilty Conscience", which uses the radio edit. Certain profanities remain on several tracks, as words including "shit", "bitch", and "ass" were not censored on The Slim Shady LP or The Marshall Mathers LP. However, on "Just Lose It", the clean version leaves "ass" uncensored, unlike on Encore, where the word "ass" was replaced with "thing".

== Track listing ==
Standard edition
No.	Title	Writer(s)	Producer(s)	Length
1.	"Intro"		Dr. Dre; Eminem^{[b]}; Luis Resto^{[a]}	0:34
2.	"Fack"	Marshall Mathers; Luis Resto; Steve King	Eminem; Luis Resto^{[a]}	3:25
3.	"The Way I Am" (from The Marshall Mathers LP)	Mathers	Eminem	4:51
4.	"My Name Is" (from The Slim Shady LP)	Mathers; Andre Young; Labi Siffre	Dr. Dre	4:28
5.	"Stan" (featuring Dido; from The Marshall Mathers LP)	Mathers; Dido Armstrong; Paul Herman	The 45 King; Eminem^{[b]}	6:44
6.	"Lose Yourself" (from 8 Mile)	Mathers; Jeff Bass; Resto	Eminem; Jeff Bass^{[a]}	5:26
7.	"Shake That" (featuring Nate Dogg)	Mathers; Resto; King; Nathaniel Hale	Eminem; Resto^{[a]}	4:34
8.	"Sing for the Moment" (from The Eminem Show)	Steven Tyler; Mathers; Bass; Resto; King	Eminem; Bass^{[b]}	5:40
9.	"Without Me" (from The Eminem Show)	Mathers; Kevin Bell; Bass; Malcolm McLaren; Anne Dudley; Trevor Horn	Eminem; Bass^{[b]}; DJ Head^{[a]}	4:51
10.	"Like Toy Soldiers" (from Encore)	Mathers; Resto; Marta Dawson; Michael Jay Margules	Eminem; Resto^{[a]}	4:55
11.	"The Real Slim Shady" (from The Marshall Mathers LP)	Mathers; Young; Tommy Coster; Mike Elizondo	Dr. Dre	4:44
12.	"Mockingbird" (from Encore)	Mathers; Resto	Eminem; Resto^{[a]}	4:11
13.	"Guilty Conscience" (featuring Dr. Dre; from The Slim Shady LP)	Mathers; Young	Dr. Dre; Eminem^{[b]}	3:20
14.	"Cleanin' Out My Closet" (from The Eminem Show)	Mathers; Bass	Eminem; Bass	4:59
15.	"Just Lose It" (from Encore)	Mathers; Young; Elizondo; Mark Batson; Chris Pope	Dr. Dre; Elizondo	4:08
16.	"When I'm Gone"	Mathers; Resto	Eminem; Resto^{[a]}	4:41
17.	"Stan" (live; featuring Elton John)	Mathers; Armstrong; Herman	The Recording Academy	6:20
Total length:				77:57

Stan's Mixtape: deluxe edition disc two
No.	Title	Writer(s)	Producer(s)	Length
1.	"Dead Wrong" (featuring The Notorious B.I.G.)	Christopher Wallace; Mathers; Chucky Thompson; Mario Winans	Chucky Thompson; Mario Winans; Diddy	4:59
2.	"Role Model" (from The Slim Shady LP)	Mathers; Young; Melvin Bradford	Dr. Dre; Mel-Man	3:25
3.	"Kill You" (from The Marshall Mathers LP)	Mathers; Young; Bradford	Dr. Dre; Mel-Man	4:24
4.	"Shit on You" (featuring D12)	Mathers; Rufus Johnson; Von Carlisle; Ondre Moore; Denaun Porter; Lonnie Smith	DJ Head; Eminem^{[a]}	5:29
5.	"Criminal" (from The Marshall Mathers LP)	Mathers; Bass Brothers	Bass Brothers; Eminem	5:14
6.	"Renegade" (featuring Jay-Z)	Shawn Carter; Mathers; Resto	Eminem	5:37
7.	"Just Don't Give a Fuck" (from The Slim Shady LP)	Mathers; Bass Brothers	Bass Brothers; Eminem^{[a]}	4:02
Total length:				111:07

Notes

- ^{^[a]} signifies an additional producer.
- ^{^[b]} signifies a co-producer.
- Clean version only includes 15 tracks with both "Intro" and "Fack" removed.

== Personnel ==
- Jeff Bass – bass, guitar, keyboard
- Karin Catt – photography
- Larry Chatman – project coordinator
- Lindsay Collins – studio coordinator
- Tommy Coster – keyboard
- DJ Head – drum programming
- Dr. Dre – producer, mixing
- Eminem – producer, executive producer, drum programming, mixing
- The 45 King & Louie – producer
- Marti Frederiksen – engineer
- Brian "Big Bass" Gardener – mastering
- Scott Hays – assistant engineer
- Richard "Segal" Herredia – engineer
- Mauricio Iragorri – engineer
- Ben Jost – assistant engineer
- Rouble Kapoor – assistant engineer
- Steven King – bass, guitar, engineer, mixing
- Anthony Mandler – photography
- Jonathan Mannion – photography
- Joe Perry – guitar solo on "Sing for the Moment"
- Kirdis Postelle – project coordinator
- Luis Resto – keyboard, programming, producer
- Tom Rounds – assistant engineer
- Les Scurry – production coordination
- Mike Sroka – assistant engineer
- Urban Kris – assistant engineer
- Nitin Vadukul – photography

== Charts ==
=== Weekly charts ===
Weekly chart performance for Curtain Call: The Hits
Chart (2005–2006)	Peak position
Australian Albums (ARIA)	1
Australian Hip-Hop/R&B Albums (ARIA)	1
Austrian Albums (Ö3 Austria)	5
Belgian Albums (Ultratop Flanders)	10
Belgian Albums (Ultratop Wallonia)	13
Canadian Albums (Billboard)	1
Czech Albums (ČNS IFPI)	32
Danish Albums (Hitlisten)	1
Dutch Albums (Album Top 100)	5
Finnish Albums (Suomen virallinen lista)	7
German Albums (Offizielle Top 100)	7
Greek Albums (IFPI)	1
Hungarian Albums (MAHASZ)	24
Irish Albums (IRMA)	1
Italian Albums (FIMI)	8
Japanese Albums (Oricon)	3
New Zealand Albums (RMNZ)	1
Norwegian Albums (VG-lista)	2
Polish Albums (ZPAV)	35
Portuguese Albums (AFP)	27
South African Albums (RISA)	3
Spanish Albums (Promusicae)	48
Swedish Albums (Sverigetopplistan)	6
Swiss Albums (Schweizer Hitparade)	5
Taiwanese Albums (Five Music)	1
UK Albums (Official Charts)	1
UK R&B Albums (Official Charts)	1
US Billboard 200	1
US Top R&B/Hip-Hop Albums (Billboard)	1
US Indie Store Album Sales (Billboard)	1

2013 weekly chart performance for Curtain Call: The Hits
Chart (2013)	Peak position
French Albums (SNEP)	141

2017 weekly chart performance for Curtain Call: The Hits
Chart (2017)	Peak position
Latvian Albums (LaIPA)	98
US Top Catalog Albums (Billboard)	1

Weekly chart performance for Curtain Call: The Hits
Chart (2024)	Peak position
UK Singles Downloads (Official Charts)	15

=== Year-end charts ===
2005 year-end chart performance for Curtain Call: The Hits
Chart (2005)	Position
Australian Albums (ARIA)	66
Australian Hip Hop/R&B Albums (ARIA)	12
Danish Albums (Hitlisten)	21
Irish Albums (IRMA)	7
Italian Albums (FIMI)	78
New Zealand Albums (RMNZ)	7
Swedish Albums (Sverigetopplistan)	80
UK Albums (OCC)	9
Worldwide Albums (IFPI)	8

2006 year-end chart performance for Curtain Call: The Hits
Chart (2006)	Position
Australian Albums (ARIA)	24
Australian Hip Hop/R&B Albums (ARIA)	2
Austrian Albums (Ö3 Austria)	34
Belgian Albums (Ultratop Flanders)	73
Danish Albums (Hitlisten)	41
Dutch Albums (Album Top 100)	69
European Hot 100 Albums (Billboard)	15
German Albums (Offizielle Top 100)	31
Greek Foreign Albums (IFPI)	38
Italian Albums (FIMI)	65
Japanese Albums (Oricon)	32
New Zealand Albums (RMNZ)	16
Swedish Albums (Sverigetopplistan)	84
Swedish Albums & Compilations (Sverigetopplistan)	100
Swiss Albums (Schweizer Hitparade)	23
UK Albums (OCC)	89
US Billboard 200	6
US Top R&B/Hip-Hop Albums (Billboard)	9

2007 year-end chart performance for Curtain Call: The Hits
Chart (2007)	Position
Australian Hip Hop/R&B Albums (ARIA)	32

2009 year-end chart performance for Curtain Call: The Hits
Chart (2009)	Position
Australian Hip Hop/R&B Albums (ARIA)	35

2010 year-end chart performance for Curtain Call: The Hits
Chart (2010)	Position
Australian Hip Hop/R&B Albums (ARIA)	23
UK Albums (OCC)	136
US Catalog Albums (Billboard)	35

2011 year-end chart performance for Curtain Call: The Hits
Chart (2011)	Position
Australian Hip Hop/R&B Albums (ARIA)	19
UK Albums (OCC)	119
US Billboard 200	145
US Catalog Albums (Billboard)	9

2012 year-end chart performance for Curtain Call: The Hits
Chart (2012)	Position
Australian Hip Hop/R&B Albums (ARIA)	17
UK Albums (OCC)	158
US Catalog Albums (Billboard)	23

2013 year-end chart performance for Curtain Call: The Hits
Chart (2013)	Position
Australian Hip Hop/R&B Albums (ARIA)	8
UK Albums (OCC)	105
US Catalog Albums (Billboard)	22

2014 year-end chart performance for Curtain Call: The Hits
Chart (2014)	Position
Australian Hip Hop/R&B Albums (ARIA)	1
Swedish Albums (Sverigetopplistan)	99

2015 year-end chart performance for Curtain Call: The Hits
Chart (2015)	Position
Australian Hip Hop/R&B Albums (ARIA)	20
Danish Albums (Hitlisten)	46
Swedish Albums (Sverigetopplistan)	62
UK Albums (OCC)	88
US Billboard 200	107

2016 year-end chart performance for Curtain Call: The Hits
Chart (2016)	Position
Canadian Albums (Billboard)	43
Danish Albums (Hitlisten)	35
Swedish Albums (Sverigetopplistan)	54
UK Albums (OCC)	64
US Billboard 200	110

2017 year-end chart performance for Curtain Call: The Hits
Chart (2017)	Position
Australian Hip Hop/R&B Albums (ARIA)	23
Belgian Midprice Albums (Ultratop Flanders)	48
Canadian Albums (Billboard)	16
Danish Albums (Hitlisten)	25
Swedish Albums (Sverigetopplistan)	58
UK Albums (OCC)	34
US Billboard 200	76
US Catalog Albums (Billboard)	7
US Top R&B/Hip-Hop Albums (Billboard)	46

2018 year-end chart performance for Curtain Call: The Hits
Chart (2018)	Position
Australian Albums (ARIA)	25
Belgian Midprice Albums (Ultratop Flanders)	26
Canadian Albums (Billboard)	22
Danish Albums (Hitlisten)	33
Irish Albums (IRMA)	25
Swedish Albums (Sverigetopplistan)	78
UK Albums (OCC)	29
US Billboard 200	59
US Catalog Albums (Billboard)	1
US Top R&B/Hip-Hop Albums (Billboard)	34

2019 year-end chart performance for Curtain Call: The Hits
Chart (2019)	Position
Australian Albums (ARIA)	24
Australian Hip Hop/R&B Albums (ARIA)	7
Canadian Albums (Billboard)	27
Irish Albums (IRMA)	34
UK Albums (OCC)	31
US Billboard 200	66
US Catalog Albums (Billboard)	5
US Top R&B/Hip-Hop Albums (Billboard)	34

2020 year-end chart performance for Curtain Call: The Hits
Chart (2020)	Position
Australian Albums (ARIA)	41
Australian Hip Hop/R&B Albums (ARIA)	8
Canadian Albums (Billboard)	46
Irish Albums (IRMA)	25
UK Albums (OCC)	28
US Billboard 200	170
US Top R&B/Hip-Hop Albums (Billboard)	90

2021 year-end chart performance for Curtain Call: The Hits
Chart (2021)	Position
Australian Albums (ARIA)	25
Canadian Albums (Billboard)	31
Irish Albums (IRMA)	20
UK Albums (OCC)	19
US Billboard 200	48
US Catalog Albums (Billboard)	4
US Top R&B/Hip-Hop Albums (Billboard)	22

2022 year-end chart performance for Curtain Call: The Hits
Chart (2022)	Position
Australian Albums (ARIA)	9
Canadian Albums (Billboard)	20
UK Albums (OCC)	6
US Billboard 200	45
US Top R&B/Hip-Hop Albums (Billboard)	22

2023 year-end chart performance for Curtain Call: The Hits
Chart (2023)	Position
Australian Albums (ARIA)	19
Canadian Albums (Billboard)	17
UK Albums (OCC)	7
US Billboard 200	36
US Top R&B/Hip-Hop Albums (Billboard)	15

2024 year-end chart performance for Curtain Call: The Hits
Chart (2024)	Position
Australian Albums (ARIA)	23
Australian Hip Hop/R&B Albums (ARIA)	4
Canadian Albums (Billboard)	16
UK Albums (OCC)	13
US Billboard 200	37
US Top R&B/Hip-Hop Albums (Billboard)	7

2025 year-end chart performance for Curtain Call: The Hits
Chart (2025)	Position
Australian Albums (ARIA)	41
Canadian Albums (Billboard)	27
UK Albums (OCC)	25
US Billboard 200	50
US Top R&B/Hip-Hop Albums (Billboard)	15

=== Decade-end charts ===
2000s decade-end chart performance for Curtain Call: The Hits
Chart (2000–2009)	Position
UK Albums (OCC)	89
US Billboard 200	161

2010s decade-end chart performance for Curtain Call: The Hits
Chart (2010–2019)	Position
UK Albums (OCC)	51

== Certifications ==
Certifications for Curtain Call: The Hits
Region	Certification	Certified units/sales
Australia (ARIA)	12× Platinum	840,000^{‡}
Austria (IFPI Austria)	Gold	15,000^{*}
Brazil (Pro-Música Brasil)	Gold	50,000^{*}
Denmark (IFPI Danmark)	7× Platinum	140,000^{‡}
France (SNEP)	2× Gold	200,000^{*}
Germany (BVMI)	3× Platinum	600,000^{‡}
Greece (IFPI Greece)	Gold	10,000^{^}
Ireland (IRMA)	7× Platinum	105,000^{^}
Italy (FIMI) sales since 2009	2× Platinum	100,000^{‡}
Japan (RIAJ)	2× Platinum	500,000^{^}
New Zealand (RMNZ)	7× Platinum	105,000^{‡}
South Africa (RISA)	Platinum	50,000^{*}
Sweden (GLF)	Gold	30,000^{^}
Switzerland (IFPI Switzerland)	Gold	20,000^{^}
United Kingdom (BPI)	12× Platinum	3,600,000^{‡}
United States (RIAA)	Diamond	10,000,000^{‡}
Summaries
Europe (IFPI)	2× Platinum	2,000,000^{*}
^{*} Sales figures based on certification alone.^{^} Shipments figures based on certification alone.^{‡} Sales+streaming figures based on certification alone.

== See also ==
- List of best-selling albums in Australia
- List of best-selling albums of the 21st century
