= Ass Like That =

Single by Eminem

from the album Encore
- Released: June 7, 2005
- Recorded: July-August 2004
- Genre: Comedy hip hop
- Length: 4:25
- Label: Aftermath; Shady; Interscope
- Songwriters: Marshall Mathers; Andre Young; Michael Elizondo Jr.; Mark Batson; Chris Pope
- Producers: Dr. Dre; Mike Elizondo

Eminem singles chronology
"Mockingbird" (2005)	"Ass Like That" (2005)	"Welcome 2 Detroit" (2005)

Music video
- "Ass Like That" on YouTube

"Ass Like That" is a song by American rapper Eminem from his fifth studio album Encore (2004). It was released as the sixth and final single from the album on June 7, 2005. The music video features Triumph the Insult Comic Dog, along with other puppets and main characters from Crank Yankers.

== Critical reception ==
The song received generally positive reviews from critics. Stephen Thomas Erlewine of AllMusic wrote: "Eminem is plain-spoken and literal, intent on refuting every critic from Benzino at The Source to Triumph the Insult Comic Dog, who gets an entire song ("Ass Like That") devoted to him." HipHopDX editor J-23 was divided: "'Ass Like That' is gonna be a song you either love or hate. Whatever the case, it sure is surreal to hear him rap an entire song as that Triumph puppet from MTV."

Scott Plagenhoef of Pitchfork was positive: "Em also shines when he spins well off his axis, as he does on ... the R. Kelly/Triumph the Insult Comic Dog-baiting 'Ass Like That'," but he noted that the song sounds like mixtape material. NME magazine was unimpressed, calling the song a "silly, groin-levelled [doodle] that [demonstrates] both producer and rhymer aren't just on autopilot, they're having a nice snooze in the cockpit while the plane plummets towards Earth. Or to put it another way, [this track is] undercooked juvenile shite."

USA Today wrote that "On the lighter side, [Em] name-drops the likes of Britney Spears, Janet Jackson, and Mary-Kate and Ashley Olsen on 'Ass Like That'." RapReviews noted that "In 'Ass Like That' Slim impersonates Triumph the Insult Comic Dog for three perverse verses of ogling over the Olsen twins and booty bashing Hilary Duff." Josh Love of Stylus Magazine was negative: "'Ass Like That', Em's 'response' to Triumph, fares better, and actually makes a pretty salient point about Hollywood's fetishization of barely legal starlets, but then you realize that it's an answer record to an awards show beef with a hand puppet and suddenly you're not even able to make eye contact with the album cover anymore" and he added that it does flash some of Eminem's once-patented lyrical venom.

The Austin Chronicle called the song a "demented Bollywood fever dream [that] manages to out-deprave R. Kelly." SPIN said that the song was "so sophomoric that [it borders] on surreal, all syncopated dis-gibberish and loony celebrity-baiting." The New York Times said that the song was "brilliantly insane: Dr. Dre lays some curlicued sitars atop a lazy bass line, while Eminem pays tribute to Hilary Duff and the Olsen Twins, delivering his rhymes in a thick accent that's supposed to be either Triumph the Insult Comic Dog or Arnold Schwarzenegger (apparently, they talk the same)." Slant Magazine called "Ass Like That" "a whole song devoted to Robert Smigel’s Triumph The Insult Comic Dog".

The A.V. Club called it "a track so muddled that it's hard to tell whether it's a song-length putdown of Triumph The Insult Comic Dog or an elaborate backhanded homage. The song backfires spectacularly, because Eminem and Triumph essentially share the same shtick—deflating celebrity egos with barbed wisecracks—and because at this point, Triumph is a lot funnier and more pointed in his putdowns than his human counterpart."

== Track listing ==
Digital Download
No.	Title	Writer(s)	Producer(s)	Length
1.	"Ass Like That" (album version) (edited)	Marshall Mathers; Andre Young; Mike Elizondo; Mark Batson; Chris Pope	Dr. Dre; Mike Elizondo	4:25
2.	"Business" (live in L.A.)	Mathers; Young; Theron Feemster; Elizondo	Dr. Dre	2:34
3.	"Ass like That" (instrumental)	Mathers; Young; Elizondo; Batson; Pope	Dr. Dre; Elizondo	4:47
Total length:				11:46

UK CD Single
No.	Title	Writer(s)	Producer(s)	Length
1.	"Ass Like That" (album version) (edited)	Marshall Mathers; Andre Young; Mike Elizondo; Mark Batson; Chris Pope	Dr. Dre; Mike Elizondo	4:25
2.	"Business" (live in L.A.)	Mathers; Young; Theron Feemster; Elizondo	Dr. Dre	2:34
3.	"Ass like That" (instrumental)	Mathers; Young; Elizondo; Batson; Pope	Dr. Dre; Elizondo	4:47
4.	"Ass Like That" (video) (director's cut)	Mathers; Young; Elizondo; Batson; Pope	Dr. Dre; Elizondo	4:45
Total length:				16:31

7" vinyl
No.	Title	Writer(s)	Producer(s)	Length
1.	"Ass Like That" (album version) (edited)	Marshall Mathers; Andre Young; Mike Elizondo; Mark Batson; Chris Pope	Dr. Dre; Mike Elizondo	4:25
2.	"Ass Like That" (instrumental)	Mathers; Young; Elizondo; Batson; Pope	Dr. Dre; Elizondo	4:47
Total length:				9:12

== Charts ==
=== Weekly charts ===
Chart (2005)	Peak position
Australia (ARIA)	10
Australian Urban (ARIA)	5
Austria (Ö3 Austria Top 40)	27
Belgium (Ultratop 50 Flanders)	20
Belgium (Ultratop 50 Wallonia)	23
Denmark (Tracklisten)	6
Europe (European Hot 100 Singles)	11
Germany (GfK)	31
Greece (IFPI)	13
Ireland (IRMA)	4
Netherlands (Single Top 100)	25
New Zealand (Recorded Music NZ)	9
Romanian Singles Chart	17
Scotland Singles (OCC)	5
Switzerland (Schweizer Hitparade)	25
UK Singles (OCC)	4
UK Hip Hop/R&B (OCC)	3
US Billboard Hot 100	60
US Hot R&B/Hip-Hop Songs (Billboard)	93

=== Year-end charts ===
Chart (2005)	Position
Australia (ARIA)	69
UK Singles (Official Charts Company)	99

== Certifications ==
Region	Certification	Certified units/sales
Australia (ARIA)	3× Platinum	210,000^{‡}
New Zealand (RMNZ)	Platinum	30,000^{‡}
United Kingdom (BPI)	Gold	400,000^{‡}
United States (RIAA)	Platinum	1,000,000^{‡}
^{‡} Sales+streaming figures based on certification alone.
