= Mockingbird (Eminem song) =

2005 single by Eminem

Single by Eminem

from the album Encore
- Released: April 25, 2005
- Recorded: April 2004
- Genre: Conscious hip hop
- Length: 4:17
- Label: Aftermath; Shady; Interscope
- Songwriters: Marshall Mathers; Luis Resto
- Producers: Eminem; Luis Resto (add.)

Eminem singles chronology
"Like Toy Soldiers" (2005)	"Mockingbird" (2005)	"Ass Like That" (2005)

Music video
- "Mockingbird" on YouTube

"Mockingbird" is a song by American rapper Eminem from his fifth studio album Encore (2004). It was released as the fifth single from the album on April 25, 2005, through Aftermath Entertainment, Shady Records, and Interscope Records. The song was later included on Eminem's greatest hits compilation album Curtain Call: The Hits (2005). It was written and produced by Eminem himself and Luis Resto. The song is dedicated to Eminem’s two daughters, Hailie Jade and Alaina Marie, who were 9 and 11 years old at the time.

"Mockingbird" received generally positive reviews from music critics, who praised the song for the content matter and Eminem's delivery. It peaked at number 11 on the Billboard Hot 100 and number 51 on the Hot R&B/Hip-Hop Songs chart, as well as Number 10 on the Hot Rap Songs chart. On March 8, 2022, RIAA certified the track 5× Platinum. The song won a Teen Choice Award for Choice Music: Rap Track at the 2005 Teen Choice Awards. It received a Grammy nomination for Best Rap Solo Performance at the 48th Annual Grammy Awards. During 2023, it got popularized on social media platform TikTok, causing the song to re-chart on various charts. On March 23, 2023, "Mockingbird" surpassed 1 billion streams on Spotify.

The song was accompanied by a music video, which Eminem himself and John 'Quig' Quigley directed. The video was released on February 21, 2005, through Interscope Records, and later was released on December 24, 2009, on YouTube. As of 2026, the video has over 1.5 billion views on YouTube, making it Eminem's fifth most viewed video on the platform.

== Composition and lyrics ==
"Mockingbird" is a song by Eminem dedicated to his daughters, Hailie Jade and Alaina Marie (also known as Lainie), who were 9 and 11 years old at the time of the song's release. The song serves as an expression of remorse and a pledge from Eminem to his daughters, acknowledging the difficulties they faced due to his fame and their family circumstances.

The song begins with Eminem encouraging his daughters to "straighten up" and "stiffen up that upper lip", as he attempts to comfort them and provide an explanation for their circumstances. He acknowledges their feelings of missing their mother, Kimberly Scott, his ex-wife, and himself during periods when he was away on tour or focused on his music career.

Eminem reflects on his efforts to provide a better life for his daughters than he had, while also recognizing that this has exposed them to negative media attention and public scrutiny. He recounts several challenging experiences they endured, including: break-ins, drug addictions, and custody disputes.

Throughout "Mockingbird", Eminem repeatedly reassures his daughters, urging them not to cry and emphasizing his love and commitment to them. He expresses hope that one day they will look back and view these hardships as a distant memory.

The song runs for 4 mins and 11 secs. The song is written in the key of E minor, with a tempo of 84 beats per minute, the song follows a chord progression sequence of Em-C-D-Em.

The chorus of the song is based on a traditional lullaby called "Hush, Little Baby".

== Critical response ==
"Mockingbird" received generally positive reviews from music critics. Entertainment Weekly's David Browne wrote: "Again he addresses a song to his daughter ('Mockingbird') and explains how he's working hard at being a good father." J-23 of HipHopDX praised the song: "Things get a bit better at the end, 'Mockingbird' is another song for Hailie that is most notable for flawless delivery." Steve Jones of USA Today was positive: "The affectionate Mockingbird talks directly to his 9-year-old daughter, Hailie Jade, and 8-year-old niece, Alaina, trying to explain Kim's troubles with the law and his constant travel." James Corne of RapReviews was also satisfied, saying, "Predictably, Eminem lays down one for Hailie with "Mockingbird," but what is not foreseeable is that it actually works." The New York Times was mixed: "the I-love-my-daughter ode 'Mockingbird'" isn't the most exciting thing according to Kelefa Sanneh. Stylus Magazine was negative: "Encore dutifully deploys the obligatory Hailie ode ("Mockingbird")."

The A.V. Club was a bit positive: "On 'Mockingbird,' Eminem lets his hatred of his ex-wife lie dormant just long enough to provide his daughter with a haunting account of how parents sometimes just can't make it work, no matter how much both parties want to." Los Angeles Times also agreed: "In the tender 'Mockingbird,' the Detroit-based rapper outlines his devotion to his daughter, Hailie. Against a restrained, almost hypnotic musical backdrop, Eminem tries to help the child make sense of a world in which her father is always on the run because of his career, and her mother, Kim, makes headlines with legal troubles, including a drug arrest last year. Normally, much of Eminem's lure as a rapper is in the speed and authority of his rapid-fire delivery, but he raps here with the gentleness of a man with his arms around his daughter: 'I know it's confusing to you/ Daddy's always on the move/ Mama's always on the news.'" The Austin Chronicle is a bit negative, saying that in the song "he still hates his ... ex-wife as much as he loves his daughter. Yawn." The Boston Phoenix called it "the address-to-his-daughter" song that is "more consistently remarkable than 'Mosh'".

== Legacy ==
Eminem performed "Mockingbird" throughout his 2005 Anger Management Tour, typically near the end of each show.He also performed the song at that year's MTV Movie Awards.

Rapper Baby Keem's song "Apologize" from his 2019 mixtape Die for My Bitch samples his unique, but well-known flow, using a similar melodic tone as Eminem's "Mockingbird". Rapper Lil Nas X in his 2021 album Montero samples "Mockingbird" for the chorus of "Don't Want It"; being similar in word pattern and lyrics.

British Rapper E1 (3x3) released a remix to the song in 2022.

DJs Tiësto, Dimitri Vegas & Like Mike, and Gabry Ponte released "Mockingbird" in 2024 which interpolates the chorus.

In 2023, after the song garnered massive interest on social networking site TikTok, "Mockingbird" reached 1 billion streams on Spotify and placed on numerous music charts worldwide.

In April 2025, Tory Lanez, a Canadian singer serving a 10-year prison sentence for shooting rapper Megan Thee Stallion in 2020, released the track "Dear Kai", which is named for his son and interpolates "Mockingbird".

== Awards and nominations ==
Year	Ceremony	Award	Result
2005	Teen Choice Awards	Choice Music: Rap Track	Won
2006	Grammy Awards	Best Rap Solo Performance	Nominated

== Track listing ==
UK CD1, digital download, German 3" CD single

No.	Title	Writer(s)	Producer(s)	Length
1.	"Mockingbird"	Marshall Mathers; Luis Resto	Eminem; Luis Resto^{[a]}	4:11
2.	"Encore" (UMI fade version) (featuring Dr. Dre and 50 Cent)	Mathers; Andre Young; Curtis Jackson; Mike Elizondo; Mark Batson; Chris Pope	Dr. Dre; Mark Batson	5:12
Total length:				9:23

UK CD2

No.	Title	Writer(s)	Producer(s)	Length
1.	"Mockingbird"	Mathers; Resto	Eminem; Resto^{[a]}	4:11
2.	"Mockingbird" (instrumental)	Mathers; Resto	Eminem; Resto^{[a]}	4:11
3.	"Just Lose It" (DJ Green Lantern remix)	Young; Elizondo; Batson; Chris Pope	Dr. Dre; Elizondo	3:30
4.	"Mockingbird" (video)	Mathers; Resto	Eminem; Resto^{[a]}	4:11
Total length:				16:01

Digital EP

No.	Title	Writer(s)	Producer(s)	Length
1.	"Mockingbird"	Mathers; Resto	Eminem; Resto^{[a]}	4:11
2.	"Mockingbird" (instrumental)	Mathers; Resto	Eminem; Resto^{[a]}	4:11
3.	"Encore" (UMI fade version) (featuring Dr. Dre and 50 Cent)	Mathers; Young; Jackson; Elizondo; Batson; Pope	Dr. Dre; Batson	5:12
Total length:				13:34

German CD single

No.	Title	Writer(s)	Producer(s)	Length
1.	"Mockingbird"	Mathers; Resto	Eminem; Resto^{[a]}	4:11
2.	"Encore" (UMI fade version) (featuring Dr. Dre and 50 Cent)	Mathers; Young; Jackson; Elizondo; Batson; Pope	Dr. Dre; Batson	5:12
3.	"Mockingbird" (instrumental)	Mathers; Resto	Eminem; Resto^{[a]}	4:11
4.	"Mockingbird" (video)	Mathers; Resto	Eminem; Resto^{[a]}	4:11
Total length:				17:45

Notes
- ^{^[a]} signifies an additional producer.

== Chart positions ==
=== Weekly charts ===
Weekly chart performance
Chart (2005)	Peak position
Australian Urban (ARIA)	6
Austria (Ö3 Austria Top 40)	18
Belgium (Ultratip Bubbling Under Wallonia)	2
Belgium (Ultratop 50 Flanders)	20
Brazil (ABPD)	38
Canada CHR/Pop Top 30 (Radio & Records)	13
Czech Republic (IFPI)	14
Denmark (Tracklisten)	11
European Hot 100	8
Germany (GfK)	15
Irish Singles Chart	7
Italy (FIMI)	20
Netherlands (Single Top 100)	19
New Zealand (Recorded Music NZ)	8
Norway (VG-lista)	7
Switzerland (Schweizer Hitparade)	14
UK Singles (Official Charts)	4
UK Hip Hop/R&B (Official Charts)	3
US Billboard Hot 100	11
US Hot R&B/Hip-Hop Songs (Billboard)	51
US Pop Airplay (Billboard)	6
US Rhythmic Airplay (Billboard)	6

Chart (2017)	Peak position
Sweden Heatseeker (Sverigetopplistan)	18

Chart (2022–2023)	Peak position
Austria (Ö3 Austria Top 40)	3
Czech Republic Singles Digital (ČNS IFPI)	9
Denmark (Tracklisten)	38
Finland (Suomen virallinen lista)	9
France (SNEP)	122
Germany (GfK)	5
Global 200 (Billboard)	42
Greece International (IFPI)	5
Hungary (Single Top 40)	17
Hungary (Stream Top 40)	17
India International (IMI)	7
Latvia (LaIPA)	10
Lithuania (AGATA)	8
Poland (Polish Streaming Top 100)	17
Portugal (AFP)	21
Russia Airplay (TopHit)	73
Slovakia (Singles Digitál Top 100)	4
Sweden (Sverigetopplistan)	17
Switzerland (Schweizer Hitparade)	5
UK Singles (Official Charts)	31

Chart (2026)	Peak position
Nigeria (TurnTable Top 100)	79

=== Monthly charts ===
Monthly chart performance
Chart (2023)	Peak position
Russia Airplay (TopHit)	77

=== Year-end charts ===
Year-end chart performance
Chart (2005)	Position
Australia (ARIA)	73
UK Singles (Official Charts Company)	66
US Billboard Hot 100	59

Year-end chart performance
Chart (2022)	Position
Hungary (Stream Top 40)	84

Year-end chart performance
Chart (2023)	Position
Australia (ARIA)	99
Austria (Ö3 Austria Top 40)	8
Denmark (Tracklisten)	100
Germany (Official German Charts)	11
Global 200 (Billboard)	48
Netherlands (Single Top 100)	80
Poland (Polish Streaming Top 100)	54
Sweden (Sverigetopplistan)	84
Switzerland (Schweizer Hitparade)	7

Year-end chart performance
Chart (2024)	Position
Global 200 (Billboard)	148
Switzerland (Schweizer Hitparade)	38

== Certifications ==
Certifications for "Mockingbird"
Region	Certification	Certified units/sales
Australia (ARIA)	9× Platinum	630,000^{‡}
Belgium (BRMA)	Gold	20,000^{‡}
Brazil (Pro-Música Brasil)	Platinum	60,000^{‡}
Denmark (IFPI Danmark)	3× Platinum	270,000^{‡}
Germany (BVMI)	5× Gold	750,000^{‡}
Italy (FIMI)	2× Platinum	200,000^{‡}
New Zealand (RMNZ)	5× Platinum	150,000^{‡}
Nigeria (TCSN)	Silver	25,000^{‡}
Portugal (AFP)	4× Platinum	40,000^{‡}
Spain (Promusicae)	Gold	30,000^{‡}
Switzerland (IFPI Switzerland)	6× Platinum	240,000^{‡}
United Kingdom (BPI)	4× Platinum	2,400,000^{‡}
United States (RIAA)	5× Platinum	5,000,000^{‡}
Streaming
Greece (IFPI Greece)	3× Platinum	6,000,000^{†}
^{‡} Sales+streaming figures based on certification alone.^{†} Streaming-only figures based on certification alone.

== Release history ==
Release dates and formats for "Mockingbird"
Region	Date	Format	Label(s)	Ref.
United States	January 18, 2005	Mainstream airplay	Shady; Interscope	
