= Shake That =

2006 single by Eminem ft. Nate Dogg

Single by Eminem featuring Nate Dogg

from the album Curtain Call: The Hits
- Released: January 17, 2006
- Recorded: October 2005
- Genre: G-funk; comedy hip hop; dirty rap
- Length: 4:33
- Label: Shady; Aftermath; Interscope
- Songwriters: Marshall Mathers; Nathaniel Hale; Luis Resto; Steve King
- Producers: Eminem; Luis Resto (add.)

Eminem singles chronology
"When I'm Gone" (2005)	"Shake That" (2006)	"Smack That" (2006)

Nate Dogg singles chronology
"Real Soon" (2005)	"Shake That" (2006)	"Have a Party" (2006)

Alternative cover
- Vinyl single

Music video
- "Shake That" on YouTube

"Shake That" (also known as "Shake That Ass") is a song by American rapper Eminem featuring American singer and rapper Nate Dogg. It is the second and final single taken from the former's first compilation album, Curtain Call: The Hits (2005), as well as one of three original songs featured on the album.

== Song information ==
The music video was animated by Toronto-based Plates Animation company and depicts Eminem and Nate Dogg at a nightclub. The single was released in early 2006 in the United States where it peaked at No. 6. In the UK, the song was released as a download-only single in April 2006, peaking at No. 28 on the UK Download Chart.

== Remix ==
A remixed version of the song, which adds Obie Trice and Bobby Creekwater, appears on Eminem Presents: The Re-Up (2006). Eminem does not have a verse on the remix; he does, however, still rap the intro to the song.

== Critical reception ==
AllMusic wrote a mixed opinion: "sex song that finds Shady sounding as if he's drifting along in his own orbit. "Shake That" has an incongruous Nate Dogg crooning the chorus." Pitchfork thinks that this song is just another "lesser version of Eminem songs that already piss me (critic) off." IGN called it a "rump mover" and wrote a positive review: "a booty shaker, again showing promise in Em's production. It's still a pretty simple bump-n-shuffle number, but it swings with a sense of upbeat minimalism and takes his trademark dark sounds into a slightly lighter venue." Sputnik Music opined, "Shake That features Nate Dogg, and is the quintessential club banger". Rolling Stone called this song a "Nate Dogg throwaway".

"Shake That" was nominated for "Best Rap/Sung Collaboration" at the 49th Annual Grammy Awards, but it lost to Justin Timberlake and T.I.'s "My Love". "Shake That" was certified gold in Sweden, and platinum in Denmark, both due to strong digital downloads.

== Awards and nominations ==
Awards and nominations for "Shake That"
Year	Ceremony	Award	Result
2007	People's Choice Awards	Favorite Hip-Hop Song	Nominated
2007	Grammy Awards	Best Rap/Sung Collaboration	Nominated

== Track listing ==
Digital download
No.	Title	Writer(s)	Producer(s)	Length
1.	"Shake That" (featuring Nate Dogg; radio edit – clean)	Marshall Mathers; Nathaniel Hale; Luis Resto; Steve King	Eminem; Luis Resto^{[a]}	4:34
2.	"Shake That" (featuring Nate Dogg; music video – edited version)	Mathers; Hale; Resto; King	Eminem; Resto^{[a]}	3:54
Total length:				7:48

Promotional CD single
No.	Title	Writer(s)	Producer(s)	Length
1.	"Shake That" (featuring Nate Dogg; radio edit – clean)	Marshall Mathers; Nathaniel Hale; Luis Resto; Steve King	Eminem; Luis Resto^{[a]}	3:54
2.	"Shake That" (featuring Nate Dogg; album version – dirty)	Mathers; Hale; Resto; King	Eminem; Resto^{[a]}	4:33
3.	"Shake That" (featuring Nate Dogg; instrumental)	Mathers; Hale; Resto; King	Eminem; Resto^{[a]}	4:36
Total length:				14:05

12" vinyl
No.	Title	Writer(s)	Producer(s)	Length
1.	"Shake That" (featuring Nate Dogg; radio edit – clean)	Marshall Mathers; Nathaniel Hale; Luis Resto; Steve King	Eminem; Luis Resto^{[a]}	3:54
2.	"Shake That" (featuring Nate Dogg; album version – dirty)	Mathers; Hale; Resto; King	Eminem; Resto^{[a]}	4:33
3.	"Shake That" (featuring Nate Dogg; instrumental)	Mathers; Hale; Resto; King	Eminem; Resto^{[a]}	4:36
4.	"Shake That" (featuring Nate Dogg; acapella)	Mathers; Hale; Resto; King	Eminem; Resto^{[a]}	4:06
Total length:				18:11

Notes

- ^{^[a]} signifies an additional producer.

== Charts ==
=== Weekly charts ===
Weekly chart performance for "Shake That"
Chart (2006)	Peak position
Belgium (Ultratip Bubbling Under Flanders)	2
Belgium (Ultratip Bubbling Under Wallonia)	12
Canada CHR/Pop Top 30 (Radio & Records)	13
Hungary (Dance Top 40)	7
Sweden (Sverigetopplistan)	59
UK Singles Downloads (Official Charts)	28
US Billboard Hot 100	6
US Hot Rap Songs (Billboard)	11
US Pop Airplay (Billboard)	13
US Pop 100 (Billboard)	6

Weekly chart performance for "Shake That"
Chart (2013)	Peak position
UK Singles (Official Charts)	90
UK Hip Hop/R&B (Official Charts)	21

2022 weekly chart performance for "Shake That"
Chart (2022)	Peak position
Canada Digital Song Sales (Billboard)	39

=== Year-end charts ===
Year-end chart performance for "Shake That"
Chart (2006)	Position
Hungary (Dance Top 40)	89
US Billboard Hot 100	62

== Certifications ==
Certifications for "Shake That"
Region	Certification	Certified units/sales
Australia (ARIA)	7× Platinum	490,000^{‡}
Austria (IFPI Austria)	Gold	15,000^{*}
Denmark (IFPI Danmark)	Platinum	8,000^{^}
Germany (BVMI)	Gold	150,000^{‡}
New Zealand (RMNZ)	5× Platinum	150,000^{‡}
Sweden (GLF)	Gold	10,000^{^}
United Kingdom (BPI)	Platinum	600,000^{‡}
United States (RIAA)	4× Platinum	4,000,000^{‡}
^{*} Sales figures based on certification alone.^{^} Shipments figures based on certification alone.^{‡} Sales+streaming figures based on certification alone.

== Release history ==
Region	Date	Format(s)	Label(s)	Ref.
United States	January 17, 2006	Contemporary hit radio	Shady, Aftermath, Interscope	
