= Fack =

Song by Eminem

from the album Curtain Call: The Hits
- Released: December 6, 2005
- Genre: Comedy hip hop; dirty rap
- Length: 3:25
- Label: Shady; Aftermath; Interscope; WEB Entertainment
- Songwriters: Marshall Mathers; Luis Resto; Steve King
- Producers: Eminem; Luis Resto

"Fack" (stylized in all caps) is a song by American rapper Eminem, released in 2005 on his greatest hits album Curtain Call: The Hits as one of the three new songs recorded for the album. The song, along with the album's intro, is omitted from the clean version of the album. In 2021, the song went viral on TikTok, due to many feeling shocked upon hearing the song's lyrics.

== Background ==
In 2015, Eminem annotated the song's lyrics on Genius and ascribed the song to the prescription drug addiction he had in the mid-2000s, saying "Ambien will make you do crazy shit. Imagine if you took it all day long."

In 2016 at Lollapalooza in Brazil, Eminem performed the song in concert for the first time, much to the audience's surprise. It has been performed another two times since.

In a 2020 interview with Detroit Free Press, Eminem jokingly claimed that "Fack" is "the best song he's ever written". The same year, he joked again, posting on social media that he was working on a followup to the song.

In 2024, in a short film titled Slim Shady vs. Marshall Mathers: The Face-Off, Marshall Mathers sits down and has a conversation with his alias, Slim Shady. The two argue over who wrote the song—each pushing the blame on the other for writing what Slim calls "one of the worst songs ever". It is also revealed that the song's title was originally intended to be "Richard Gere" but was changed due to the likelihood of them being sued.

== Reception ==
AllMusic critic Stephen Thomas Erlewine called the song "wildly weird", and wrote that it "finds Eminem spending the entire track fighting off an orgasm; it seems tired, a little too close to vulgar Weird Al territory, and it doesn't help that his Jenna Jameson reference seems a little old".

Spence D. of IGN thought that "Fack" was "rather annoying", but considered it to have some of the best production Eminem has ever done. He also said, "Too bad his potty humored cartoon rant seems a bit played out and just a little over-the-top in that forced, trying-too-hard-to-be-campy way. This is a case where the beat would have been better served under different circumstances."

HotNewHipHop however considered the song to have become a cult classic, and wrote it contained a "playful, circus-like instrumental that only Slim Shady could conjure. The idea that at one time or another, Dr. Dre was subjected to a 'Fack' listening session."

== Certifications ==
Region	Certification	Certified units/sales
Australia (ARIA)	Gold	35,000^{‡}
New Zealand (RMNZ)	Gold	15,000^{‡}
United Kingdom (BPI)	Silver	200,000^{‡}
United States (RIAA)	Gold	500,000^{‡}
^{‡} Sales+streaming figures based on certification alone.
