= Encore (Eminem song) =

Promotional single by Eminem featuring Dr. Dre and 50 Cent

from the album Encore
- Released: November 9, 2004
- Recorded: July–August 2004
- Genre: Hip hop; gangsta rap
- Length: 5:48 (album version) 5:13 (clean version)
- Label: Aftermath; Shady; Interscope
- Songwriters: Marshall Mathers; Curtis Jackson; Andre Young; Mike Elizondo; Mark Batson; Chris Pope
- Producers: Dr. Dre; Mark Batson

"Encore" (stylized as "ƎNCORE" and sometimes known as "Curtains Down") is a song by American rapper Eminem featuring 50 Cent and Dr. Dre. It was written by the artists alongside Chris Pope, Mike Elizondo, and Mark Batson, the latter of which produced it with Dr. Dre. The title track from the Eminem album of the same name, it was released in 2004 as the third single on vinyl in the U.S. and is the final track from the album.

The song was nominated for Best Rap Performance by a Duo or Group at the Grammy Awards of 2006, but lost to Black Eyed Peas song "Don't Phunk with My Heart". No music video was filmed for this song. Eminem, Dre and 50 Cent would later return to work together on the song "Crack a Bottle" from Relapse. On Encore, "One Shot 2 Shot" segues into the skit "Final Thought", which then segues into Encore, which also segues into the "Curtains Down" skit.

== "Curtains Down" skit ==
After the song is over, "Encore" features a line by Eminem alerting listeners of Dr. Dre's upcoming album Detox. Eminem tells his audience "Don't worry about that Detox album. It's coming. We're gonna make Dre do it." In the song, Eminem hints at his career aspirations with the line, "10 Multi-Platinum albums later three Diamond worldwide, we hit the charts with a bullet, and still climb." After "Encore", the next track on the album is a skit in which Eminem returns to the stage, stating that he forgot "one more thing", starts shooting at the crowd, and shoots himself through the mouth. The album's last lines are "See you in hell, fuckers" in a robotic voice, created by Eminem using an electrolarynx. Many critics thought that it might have meant Eminem will totally stop his music career. Others see it as him getting rid of his alter ego "Slim Shady", and coming back as a whole new rapper. Eminem had stated that, at that moment in time, he was not certain about the future but that he would still be involved in the music industry.

The edited version fades out before the shooting segment begins. It was later confirmed that the shooting was meant to represent the death of Slim Shady. Shady however returned in Relapse, coming back after Eminem was released from a rehabilitation center. The skit was hinted in the earlier skit "Em Calls Paul", in which he tells his manager Paul Rosenberg through the phone that he has a good idea for the ending - "I have this idea about how I want to end the show" - in the same electrolarynx voice. In the skit, he also lies to Paul that he didn't get a new gun, referencing an earlier skit on the album where Paul hears rumors about him having a new gun as well as a skit on The Eminem Show, where Paul was stressed over Eminem bringing his gun to the studio.

== Critical response ==
HipHopDX praised the song: "The best might be last [...] as Dre and 50 join Eminem for the title track and a surefire hit song." NME was negative: "‘Encore/Curtains Down’ is the archetypal ‘gang’s all here’ show-closer, only with much more swearing and ‘the gang’ in this case being Dr Dre and 50 Cent, who are really the only two of Eminem's collaborators who deserve to share his applause. A round of applause which, by the way, hidden-significance-spotters, ends with Eminem blowing his brains out." RapReviews was positive: "the album finally closes with a sure shot banger 'Encore/Curtains Down.' The Doctor lays the beat, Eminem drops the hook, and Eminem and Dre foray flames back and forth:

[Dr. Dre] 'The buzz is tremendous, we drop you all to sense it
I don't gotta promote it for you to know that doc is off the benches'

[Eminem] 'We keep the party rockin' off the hinges
We ain't showin' off, we just goin' off popular consensus'

[Dr. Dre] 'But critics say that Doc is soft, Doc is talk
Doc is all washed up, knock it off
Who the fuck is Doc impressin'?
Doc is this, Doc is that, you got the wrong impression
You must be on the cock of Doc, cuz Doc left you all guessin'
So DJ take the needle and just drop it on the record
We gon' have this mutherfucker hoppin' in a second
That's why we always save the best cut last
To make you scratch and itch for it like fresh cut grass'"

USA Today stated that Eminem "closes out [...] trading lines with 50 Cent and Dr. Dre." The New York Times, however, stated that the "Em-and-Dre tag-team title track" was not the "most exciting thing" on the album.

== Track listing ==
12" Vinyl

No.	Title	Writer(s)	Producer(s)	Length
1.	"Encore/Curtains Down" (clean version)	Marshall Mathers; Andre Young; Curtis Jackson; Mike Elizondo; Mark Batson; Chris Pope	Dr. Dre; Mark Batson	5:13
2.	"Encore/Curtains Down" (album version)	Mathers; Young; Jackson; Elizondo; Batson; Pope	Dr. Dre; Batson	5:47
3.	"Encore/Curtains Down" (instrumental)	Mathers; Young; Jackson; Elizondo; Batson; Pope	Dr. Dre; Batson	5:21
4.	"Encore/Curtains Down" (acapella)	Mathers; Young; Jackson; Elizondo; Batson; Pope	Dr. Dre; Batson	5:16
Total length:				21:37

== Charts ==
Chart (2004–05)	Peak position
Brazil (ABPD)	28
Canada CHR/Pop Top 30 (Radio & Records)	23
UK Singles (The Official Charts Company)	116
US Billboard Hot 100	25
US Hot R&B/Hip-Hop Songs (Billboard)	48
US Rap Songs (Billboard)	20
US Pop Songs (Billboard)	19
US Pop 100 (Billboard)	22
