= Just Lose It =

2004 single by Eminem

Single by Eminem

from the album Encore
- Released: September 27, 2004
- Recorded: August 2004
- Genre: Comedy hip hop
- Length: 4:08
- Label: Aftermath; Shady; Interscope
- Songwriters: Marshall Mathers; Andre Young; Mike Elizondo; Mark Batson; Chris Pope
- Producers: Dr. Dre; Mike Elizondo

Eminem singles chronology
"Business" (2003)	"Just Lose It" (2004)	"Mosh" (2004)

Music video
- "Just Lose It" on YouTube

Audio sample
- Just Lose It: file; help

"Just Lose It" is a song by American rapper Eminem from his fifth studio album, Encore (2004). It was released on September 27, 2004, as the lead single from Encore. The song caused controversy as its lyrics and music video parodies Michael Jackson, who was being accused of child molestation at the time. The song also pokes fun at MC Hammer, Madonna, and others. It also heavily spoofs Pee-wee Herman, going as far as imitating his signature shout during the chorus and Eminem dressing like him in the video.

The song peaked at number 6 on the US Billboard Hot 100 and reached number one in Australia, Canada, Denmark, New Zealand, Spain, Switzerland, and the UK as well as the top 10 in Austria, Belgium, Finland, France, Germany, Ireland, Italy, the Netherlands, and Norway.

== Critical reception ==
The song received mixed reviews from critics, many of whom found it too similar to Eminem's previous work. AllMusic highlighted the song in a review of the album. Pitchfork was also positive: "'Just Lose It' is still most notable for dancing with paedo and homoerotic imagery: It's the one track here that seems as potentially multilayered as the best of The Marshall Mathers LP, yet it's still more curio than anything else." NME wrote: "Em (is) reduced to making funny noises to keep things interesting." David Browne of Entertainment Weekly, however, felt mixed: "First [on the album] came the sarcastically bouncy "Just Lose It", a lazy retread of earlier hits that, with its easy-target references to Michael Jackson, made Eminem appear to be the one who'd actually lost it." HipHopDX panned the song and called it "by far the worst song Eminem or Dr. Dre has ever made. It really seems like their object here was to make the worst song possible. The interlude leading into it is damn hilarious though." Los Angeles Times called it "the album's hilarious slap at celebrity voyeurism, with Eminem himself a prominent target."

RapReviews argued it was not "dropping any jaws or widening any eyes." Rolling Stone described this song as "dance-music dis." In a review praising Encore's "edginess," Steve Jones of USA Today cited the song's mocking of the Michael Jackson child-molestation scandal. Alexis Petridis of The Guardian, however, wrote: "[Eminem's] plan appears to involve belching and making fart noises, which, with the best will in the world, won't suffice." Kelefa Sanneh of The New York Times wrote that song "unfolds as a series of puzzlingly unfunny jokes." Stylus Magazine was negative as well, calling it "Em's brand new tendency to bite himself." The Austin Chronicle was a bit negative as well: "Where 2002 smash 'Without Me' was bitingly clever, Encore's carbon copy 'Just Lose It' is puerile and embarrassing, even though he quotes Beavis and Butt-head and does a wicked Pee-wee Herman." Slant Magazine said that the song "was so derivative that it had to be a joke—even the song's title seemed to mock the Academy Award-winning 8 Mile theme song that elevated the Great White Rapper to a whole new level of acceptance (as if he hadn't already transcended nearly every other boundary in pop culture). Not only is 'Just Lose It' the worst song on Encore, it's easily one of the most annoying songs of the year (credit Em’s incessant Pee Wee Herman impersonations and tired attacks on Michael Jackson)."

== Music video ==
The video contains a parody of a rap battle scene from 8 Mile in which it is Eminem, as B-Rabbit, versus Eminem, as Slim Shady. It also contains several scenes where Eminem walks down the streets naked. As he does this, Dr. Dre drives next to him, looking disgusted. For the music video, the lyrics were edited slightly, notably the phrase "shake that ass", becoming the less provocative "shake that thing". Other changes include the muting of some parts of the second verse, and the phrase "butt naked" becoming "buck naked". Such examples of parodies that are included in this video are Michael Jackson, MC Hammer and his hit single "U Can't Touch This", Pee-wee Herman, Madonna, Blink-182 and the music video for "What's My Age Again?", and the movie Bad Santa, by displaying Eminem as a "mall santa", and even going so far to include Tony Cox, the actor who played the elf from the actual movie, as Eminem's helper. Some of the celebrities who appeared in this music video were Paris Hilton, Erik Estrada, Alyson Stoner, BooBoo Stewart, Omar Benson Miller, De'Angelo Wilson, 8 Mile co-star Mekhi Phifer and Dr. Dre. The video was later nominated at the MTV Video Music Awards for Best Rap Video, but lost to Ludacris' "Number One Spot". Much Music's 50 Most Controversial Videos ranked it #1 for its jokes on famous people.

=== Controversy ===
The music video for "Just Lose It" generated controversy by parodying singer Michael Jackson's child molestation trial, plastic surgery and an incident in 1984 when Jackson's hair caught fire whilst filming a Pepsi commercial.

A week after the release of "Just Lose It", Jackson called into Steve Harvey's radio show to report his displeasure with the video. "I am very angry at Eminem's depiction of me in his video," Jackson said in the interview. "I feel that it is outrageous and disrespectful. It is one thing to spoof, but it is another to be demeaning and insensitive." Jackson continued: "I've admired Eminem as an artist, and was shocked by this. The video was inappropriate and disrespectful to me, my children, my family and the community at large." Many of Jackson's supporters and friends spoke out about the video, including Stevie Wonder, who called it "kicking a man while he's down" and "bullshit", and Harvey, who declared, "Eminem has lost his ghetto pass. We want the pass back." The video was banned on the BET channel, after complaints from Benzino and others (but was later reinstated, as critics of the ban argued that Nelly's "Tip Drill" video which has been alleged to be misogynistic was aired; both were seen on BET: Uncut). However MTV did not drop it, and the video became one of the most requested on the channel.

== Remix ==
The song was remixed by Shady Records DJ and producer DJ Green Lantern. The remix's only official releases were on the British, German and digital download of "Like Toy Soldiers" and the second British edition of "Mockingbird".

== Track listing ==
Digital download

No.	Title	Writer(s)	Producer(s)	Length
1.	"Just Lose It"	Marshall Mathers; Andre Young; Mike Elizondo; Mark Batson; Chris Pope	Dr. Dre; Mike Elizondo	4:09
2.	"Lose Yourself" (soundtrack version)	Mathers; Jeffrey Bass; Luis Resto	Eminem; Jeff Bass^{[a]}	5:21
Total length:				9:30

Digital EP

No.	Title	Writer(s)	Producer(s)	Length
1.	"Just Lose It"	Marshall Mathers; Andre Young; Mike Elizondo; Mark Batson; Chris Pope	Dr. Dre; Mike Elizondo	4:09
2.	"Just Lose It" (acapella)	Mathers; Young; Elizondo; Batson; Pope	Dr. Dre; Elizondo	3:20
3.	"Just Lose It" (instrumental)	Mathers; Young; Elizondo; Batson; Pope	Dr. Dre; Elizondo	4:10
Total length:				11:39

UK CD1

No.	Title	Writer(s)	Producer(s)	Length
1.	"Just Lose It"	Marshall Mathers; Andre Young; Mike Elizondo; Mark Batson; Chris Pope	Dr. Dre; Mike Elizondo	4:09
2.	"Lose Yourself" (soundtrack version)	Mathers; Jeffrey Bass; Luis Resto	Eminem; Jeff Bass^{[a]}	5:21
Total length:				9:30

UK CD2

No.	Title	Writer(s)	Producer(s)	Length
1.	"Just Lose It"	Marshall Mathers; Andre Young; Mike Elizondo; Mark Batson; Chris Pope	Dr. Dre; Mike Elizondo	4:09
2.	"Just Lose It" (acapella)	Mathers; Young; Elizondo; Batson; Pope	Dr. Dre; Elizondo	3:20
3.	"Just Lose It" (instrumental)	Mathers; Young; Elizondo; Batson; Pope	Dr. Dre; Elizondo	4:10
4.	"Just Lose It" (video)	Mathers; Young; Elizondo; Batson; Pope	Dr. Dre; Elizondo	4:10
Total length:				15:49

German and Japanese CD single

No.	Title	Writer(s)	Producer(s)	Length
1.	"Just Lose It"	Marshall Mathers; Andre Young; Mike Elizondo; Mark Batson; Chris Pope	Dr. Dre; Mike Elizondo	4:09
2.	"Lose Yourself" (soundtrack version)	Mathers; Jeffrey Bass; Luis Resto	Eminem; Jeff Bass^{[a]}	5:21
3.	"Just Lose It" (instrumental)	Mathers; Young; Elizondo; Batson; Pope	Dr. Dre; Elizondo	4:10
4.	"Just Lose It" (video)	Mathers; Young; Elizondo; Batson; Pope	Dr. Dre; Elizondo	4:10
Total length:				17:50

German 3" CD single

No.	Title	Writer(s)	Producer(s)	Length
1.	"Just Lose It"	Marshall Mathers; Andre Young; Mike Elizondo; Mark Batson; Chris Pope	Dr. Dre; Mike Elizondo	4:09
2.	"Lose Yourself" (soundtrack version)	Mathers; Jeffrey Bass; Luis Resto	Eminem; Jeff Bass^{[a]}	5:21
Total length:				9:30

Notes

- ^{^[a]} signifies an additional producer.

== Charts ==
=== Weekly charts ===
Chart (2004–05)	Peak position
Australia (ARIA)	1
Australian Urban (ARIA)	1
Austria (Ö3 Austria Top 40)	4
Belgium (Ultratop 50 Flanders)	6
Belgium (Ultratop 50 Wallonia)	8
Brazil (ABPD)	2
Canada CHR (Nielsen BDS)	1
Denmark (Tracklisten)	1
European Hot 100 Singles (Billboard)	1
Finland (Suomen virallinen lista)	2
France (SNEP)	7
Germany (GfK)	2
Hungary (Single Top 40)	3
Ireland (IRMA)	2
Italy (FIMI)	2
Latvia (Latvian Airplay Top 50)	30
Netherlands (Dutch Top 40)	5
Netherlands (Single Top 100)	5
New Zealand (Recorded Music NZ)	1
Norway (VG-lista)	3
Russia Airplay (Russia Top 20)	9
Scotland Singles (Official Charts)	1
Spain (Promusicae)	1
Sweden (Sverigetopplistan)	12
Switzerland (Schweizer Hitparade)	1
UK Singles (Official Charts)	1
UK Hip Hop/R&B (Official Charts)	2
US Billboard Hot 100	6
US Hot R&B/Hip-Hop Songs (Billboard)	35
US Pop Airplay (Billboard)	5
US Hot Rap Songs (Billboard)	7

=== Year-end charts ===
Chart (2004)	Position
Australia (ARIA)	36
Belgium (Ultratop Flanders)	93
Belgium (Ultratop Wallonia)	93
Brazil (Crowley)	50
France (SNEP)	78
Germany (Official German Charts)	69
Ireland (IRMA)	15
Italy (FIMI)	27
Netherlands (Dutch Top 40)	66
Netherlands (Single Top 100)	87
New Zealand (Recorded Music NZ)	32
Sweden (Sverigetopplistan)	84
Switzerland (Schweizer Hitparade)	43
UK Singles (Official Charts Company)	23
US Billboard Hot 100	98
Chart (2005)	Position
Brazil (Crowley)	82
Switzerland (Schweizer Hitparade)	77

== Certifications ==
Region	Certification	Certified units/sales
Australia (ARIA)	4× Platinum	280,000^{‡}
Germany (BVMI)	Gold	150,000^{‡}
Norway (IFPI Norway)	Gold	5,000^{*}
United Kingdom (BPI)	Platinum	600,000^{‡}
United States (RIAA)	2× Platinum	2,000,000^{‡}
^{*} Sales figures based on certification alone.^{‡} Sales+streaming figures based on certification alone.

== Release history ==
Region	Date	Format(s)	Label(s)	Ref.
United States	September 27, 2004	Contemporary hit · rhythmic contemporary · urban contemporary radio	Shady, Aftermath, Interscope	

== See also ==
- List of number-one singles in Australia in 2004
- List of number-one hits in Denmark
- List of European number-one hits of 2004
- List of number-one singles in 2004 (New Zealand)
- List of number-one singles of 2004 (Spain)
- List of number-one hits of 2004 (Switzerland)
- List of number-one singles from the 2000s (UK)
