= Encore (Eminem album) =

2004 album by Eminem

Studio album by Eminem
- Released: November 12, 2004
- Recorded: June 2002—August 2004
- Studios: 54 Sound (Ferndale, Michigan); Trans Continental (Orlando, Florida)
- Genres: Conscious hip-hop; comedy rap
- Length: 77:06; 89:16 (deluxe edition)
- Labels: Shady; Goliath; Aftermath; WEB; Interscope
- Producers: Dr. Dre; Eminem; Luis Resto; Mike Elizondo; Mark Batson

Eminem chronology
The Eminem Show (2002)	Encore (2004)	Curtain Call: The Hits (2005)

Singles from Encore
- 1. "Just Lose It" Released: September 27, 2004; 2. "Encore" Released: November 9, 2004; 3. "Like Toy Soldiers" Released: March 15, 2005; 4. "Mockingbird" Released: April 25, 2005; 5. "Ass Like That" Released: June 7, 2005

Encore is the fifth studio album by the American rapper Eminem, released on November 12, 2004, through Aftermath Entertainment, Shady Records, WEB Entertainment, Goliath Artists, and Interscope Records. As reflected in its title, cover art, and certain lyrics, the album was originally set to be Eminem's final studio album. Its lyrical themes include Eminem's criticism of then U.S. president George W. Bush, parodies of singer Michael Jackson and actor Christopher Reeve, and Eminem's feud with rappers Benzino and Ja Rule. Overall, the album features more comedic themes and lyrics than Eminem's previous albums.

Encore charted at number one in Australia, Canada, France, Germany, Ireland, New Zealand, South Africa, the United Kingdom, and the United States. By August 2005, the album had reached sales of 11 million copies worldwide. Encore was met with mixed reviews, with many critics deeming it inferior to his past material. Most of the album's middle portion was heavily criticized, though "Like Toy Soldiers" and "Mockingbird" were particularly highly praised and have retrospectively been ranked as some of Eminem's best songs. These songs were released along with three other singles: "Just Lose It", "Encore", and "Ass Like That". The album was nominated for the Grammy Award for Best Rap Album, but lost to Late Registration by Kanye West.

In retrospect, Eminem has stated that he believes Encore to be one of his worst albums, which he attributed to several songs intended to be part of the album being leaked prior to its official release, requiring him to hastily write and record new ones. These leaked songs were compiled into a bootleg album titled Straight from the Lab. Eminem later revealed that he was also struggling with drug addiction during much of Encore's recording. After its release, Eminem went on a hiatus until the release of Relapse in 2009.

== Background ==
Prior to producing Encore, American rapper Marshall Bruce Mathers III, better known as Eminem, had released several other studio albums—The Slim Shady LP (1999), The Marshall Mathers LP (2000), and The Eminem Show (2002)—each to critical acclaim. However, Eminem became addicted to a number of drugs during this time, including Valium, Ambien, and Vicodin. In Amsterdam, where a large portion of The Marshall Mathers LP was recorded, Eminem would sometimes take MDMA with his mentor and fellow producer Dr. Dre before an extended recording session. In a cover story celebrating the 25th anniversary of XXL magazine, Eminem stated: "So, I'm coming off The Marshall Mathers LP and going into Encore when my addiction started to get bad. I was taking Vicodin, Valium and alcohol." Eminem specifically recalled an interview alongside hip-hop group G-Unit following their performance in Black Entertainment Television's music video show 106 & Park, in which he was unable to understand any of the questions one of the host asked him, requiring fellow rapper 50 Cent to answer them all for him.

Despite his worsening drug addiction, by 2004, Eminem had won nine Grammy Awards, as well as an Oscar Award for his starring role in the 2002 biographical film 8 Mile. During the time Eminem was recording for Encore in 2003, he was also producing for artists signed to his record label Shady Records, including 50 Cent and Obie Trice. That year, 50 Cent and Trice released their debut studio albums, Get Rich or Die Tryin' and Cheers, respectively, to critical acclaim and commercial success. However, Shady Records inherited a feud between 50 Cent and rapper Ja Rule, as well as Ja Rule's record label, Murder Inc. Records, which had led to multiple diss tracks, including one from Ja Rule in which he mentions Eminem, Dr. Dre, and Eminem's daughter Hailie. Meanwhile, Eminem and his record label were feuding with rapper Benzino and Benzino's hip-hop magazine, The Source, resulting in additional diss tracks. These events are referenced in "Like Toy Soldiers", a song on Encore.

== Recording and production ==
Encore was recorded at 54 Studio in Ferndale, Michigan, a suburb of Detroit, though a portion of the album was recorded at Trans Continental in Orlando, Florida. Eight of the twenty tracks on the album were produced by Dr. Dre, who had produced songs for all of Eminem's albums since The Slim Shady LP. Songwriters Luis Resto, Mike Elizondo, and Mark Batson also produced for the album.

In December 2003, seven songs recorded by Eminem were leaked online, including several songs intended to be part of Encore: "We As Americans", "Bully", and "Love You More". All of these songs were compiled into a bootleg album titled Straight from the Lab. The leak required Eminem to travel to Los Angeles to record new songs for Encore with Dr. Dre. Eminem's worsening drug addiction, coupled with the songs being written in a hurry, resulted in them having a more comedic tone. Eminem has stated that Encore "would've been right there with The Eminem Show as far as its caliber" had the songs not been leaked, and revealed that "We As Americans" was supposed to be the opening track, followed by "Bully". "We As Americans" and "Love You More" were released on the deluxe edition bonus disc. "Bully", a diss track toward Benzino, Ja Rule, and Murder Inc. Records, ultimately would not see an official release.

"Christopher Reeves" was a song originally intended to be the seventh track on the album, though it was cut after its namesake, Superman film actor Christopher Reeve, died of heart failure on October 10, 2004, a month prior to the album's release. The song was later reworked and released 20 years later under the title "Brand New Dance" on Eminem's twelfth studio album, The Death of Slim Shady (Coup de Grâce) (2024).

== Lyrical themes ==
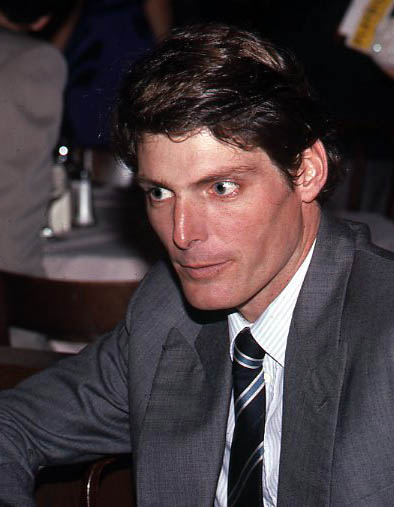
Actor Christopher Reeve is mentioned in several lyrics and was the namesake of an unused track that was later renamed and released on The Death of Slim Shady (Coup de Grâce) (2024).

Overall, Encore contains more comedic themes and lyrics than Eminem's previous albums, including occasional toilet humor. As conveyed through the album's title, cover art, and certain lyrics, Encore was originally set to be Eminem's final studio album. The album is interspersed with skits in which Eminem has phone calls with Paul Rosenberg, his music manager and entertainment attorney.

In "Evil Deeds", the second track on the album, Eminem apologizes for being his "mother's evil seed", recounts his rejection as a youth, and notes how his relationship with his daughter Hailie has become complicated by his fame. The third track, "Never Enough", features a verse from 50 Cent and a hook from Nate Dogg. In the fourth track, "Yellow Brick Road", Eminem describes his early years in Detroit and apologizes for disparaging an African-American girl who broke up with him in an old mixtape unearthed by The Source.

"Like Toy Soldiers", the fifth track on the album, interpolates the chorus of singer Martika's "Toy Soldiers". The song discusses 50 Cent's feuds with Ja Rule and Murder Inc. as well as Eminem's own feuds with Benzino and The Source, notes how hip-hop conflicts have turned fatal, and ends with Eminem offering a truce. "Like Toy Soldiers" was released as the third single from the album on March 15, 2005. "Mosh", the sixth track from the album, is a protest song targeting 43rd U.S. president George W. Bush, criticizing U.S. involvement in the Iraq War and encouraging listeners to vote Bush out of office in the 2004 United States presidential election. "Mosh" had previously been included as a track on Eminem's official mixtape Shade 45: Sirius Bizness, released on October 20, 2004.

The album's seventh track, "Puke", targets Eminem's ex-wife, Kim Scott, and includes sound effects of the rapper vomiting. The eighth track, "My 1st Single", rejects being a radio-friendly single through inappropriate lyrics and scatological sound effects. In the tenth track, "Rain Man", Eminem declares that his "new name is Rain Man", compares himself to a superhero, and mocks homophobia. "Rain Man" is followed by "Big Weenie", in which Eminem attempts to hypnotize the listener, likely intended to be Benzino, and accuses him of being jealous of Eminem's success.

The thirteenth track on the album, "Just Lose It", features lyrics targeting Michael Jackson—including ones referencing the singer's child sexual abuse allegations—as well as Eminem impersonating comedy character Pee-wee Herman. The song was released as the album's lead single on September 27, 2004.

== Artwork and packaging ==
The first of two covers for the album features Eminem standing in front of an audience, bowing to the crowd. The tray insert features Eminem holding a gun behind his back, while the inlay shows Eminem holding the pistol, a Smith & Wesson Sigma, in his mouth without his jacket on. The CD and one of the vinyl labels itself shows a suicide note written by Eminem saying "To my family & all my friends -- thank you for everything, I will always love you. To my fans, I'm sorry, Marshall" with a bullet underneath, which is also seen in the album's booklet, where Eminem is writing the note. Some pictures show Eminem shooting everyone in the audience and himself, alluding to the ending of the album's title track. The second album cover, used for the Collector's Edition, features the same audience from the inlay on a black background with a blood splat on the top right.

== Critical reception ==
Professional ratings
Aggregate scores
Source	Rating
Metacritic	64/100
Review scores
Source	Rating
AllMusic	3/5 stars
Blender	4/5 stars
Entertainment Weekly	C−
The Guardian	3/5 stars
The Independent	5/5 stars
NME	7/10
Pitchfork	6.5/10
Rolling Stone	4/5 stars
Slant Magazine	2.5/5 stars
Spin	B

Encore received mixed to positive reviews from critics, with more of a negative response compared to Eminem's past three albums. According to the review aggregator Metacritic, Encore received "generally favorable reviews" based on a weighted average score of 64 out of 100 from 26 critic scores.

Josh Love from Stylus Magazine felt Eminem was "dying" with this album, whose concept was "end-to-end mea culpa", full of "clarifications, rectifications and excuses", revising the history of "a man who knows he doesn't have much time left". Scott Plangenhoef, writing for Pitchfork called Encore a "transitional record" and "the sound of a man who seems bored of re-branding and playing celebrity games". BBC Music's Adam Webb believed it starts "fantastically" but ends "abominably", writing that it has too many "low points". David Browne from Entertainment Weekly said Eminem "sacrifices the rich, multi-textured productions" of his two previous albums for "thug-life monotony, cultural zingers for petty music-biz score-settling, and probing self-analysis for juvenile humor". He concluded his review by saying that Eminem has become "predictable" on Encore, something that he wasn't before.

Stephen Thomas Erlewine was more enthusiastic in his review for AllMusic, calling the music "spartan", built on "simple unadorned beats and keyboard loops", and the lyrics "plain-spoken and literal". Robert Christgau said Eminem still sounded "funny, catchy and clever, and irreverent past his allotted time", noting that even the bonus tracks "keep on pushing". In Rolling Stone, he wrote that Encore was not as "astonishing" as The Marshall Mathers LP, but praised Eminem for maturing his lyrical abilities while retaining his sense of humor. Steve Jones from USA Today also spoke positively about the album, calling Eminem's producing and lyrical skills as "top-flight" and noting that the record explores "the many sides of Marshall Mathers".

The album earned Eminem Grammy Award nominations in three categories at the 48th Annual Grammy Awards: Best Rap Album, Best Rap Performance by a Duo or Group for the song "Encore", and Best Rap Solo Performance for the song "Mockingbird".

Retrospectively, in a ranking of all 12 of Eminem's studio albums, Billboard magazine's Damien Scott placed Encore ninth, criticizing the songs on the back half of the album as "some of the worst [Eminem]'s ever committed to tape", though he singled out "Like Toy Soldiers" and "Mockingbird" as "some of Em's strongest and most personal songs to date" and wrote that "Encore works as an earnest rumination on the things that really make Eminem tick". Stereogum's Christopher R. Weingarten placed Encore last in a 2019 ranking of Eminem's first 10 studio albums, calling it "a rambling disaster", which he partially attributed to Eminem's drug addiction at the time. Kemet High of XXL magazine placed Encore seventh in his 2021 ranking of Eminem's first 11 studio albums, believing that it "has aged better with time" despite being "a step back in comparison to the three-album run of The Slim Shady LP, The Marshall Mathers LP and The Eminem Show that preceded it". HotNewHipHop's Paul Barnes placed Encore second to last in his 2023 ranking of all of Eminem's studio albums except Infinite, deeming many of the songs "incoherent".

=== Controversies ===
Encore provoked some controversy over anti-Bush lyrics and lyrics that parodied and targeted Michael Jackson, who criticized Eminem's depiction of him in the video for "Just Lose It" and threatened to sue him.

On December 8, 2003, the United States Secret Service stated it was "looking into" allegations that Eminem had threatened the President of the United States, George Bush, after the song "We As Americans", in an unreleased bootleg called Straight From The Lab, circulated with the lyrics "Fuck money, I don't rap for dead presidents. I'd rather see the president dead." This line was eventually used as a sample in Immortal Technique's single "Bin Laden", which featured Mos Def and Chuck D. The incident was later referenced in the video for his song "Mosh" as one of several news clips on a wall, along with other newspaper articles about other unfortunate incidents in Bush's career. The song eventually appeared on the album's bonus disc, with the word "dead" being reversed.

=== Eminem's thoughts on the album ===
In retrospect, Eminem stated numerous times that he considers Encore as one of his worst albums. He described its reception, "I'm cool with probably half that album. I recorded that towards the height of my addiction. I remember four songs leaked and I had to go to L.A. and get Dre and record new ones. I was in a room by myself writing songs in 25, and 30 minutes because we had to get it done, and what came out was so goofy. That's how I ended up making songs like 'Rain Man' and 'Big Weenie'. They're pretty out there. If those other songs hadn't leaked, Encore would've been a different album." In an interview with Sway Calloway for his album Kamikaze, he stated that although "Encore... [is] not what I would consider one of my better albums", he considered it better than its follow-up Relapse. He reiterated his statement about Encore in 2022 for the 25th anniversary issue of XXL: "It became a misstep and I struggled to get over the fact that I didn't do my best. My best would've been good enough if the leaks hadn't happened. But I released what I had at that point in time, and I feel that put a kind of a mark on my catalog. Encore did some decent numbers, but I was never that concerned with numbers. I was more so worried about what people think about the album. Critics and fans were important to me, and they were always at me about that project."

== Commercial performance ==
Encore was released on November 12, 2004. The release date was moved up from the originally planned November 16 to countermeasure leaks. The album sold 710,000 copies. The following week, the album's first with a full seven days, it moved 871,000 copies, bringing the 10-day total to 1,582,000. It was certified quadruple-platinum that mid-December.The album made digital history in becoming the first album to sell 10,000 digital copies in one week. As of November 2013, the album had sold 5,343,000 copies in the US.

According to El País, Encore was launched with 5.5 million copies shipped worldwide, including 3.75 million in the US alone according to Los Angeles Times. Nine months after its release, worldwide sales of the album stood at 11 million copies. It was the 3rd best-selling album of 2004 worldwide.

Encore sold 125,000 copies in two days in the United Kingdom, and has been certified quadruple-platinum.

== Track listing ==
Standard edition
No.	Title	Writer(s)	Producer(s)	Length
1.	"Curtains Up"			0:46
2.	"Evil Deeds"	Marshall Mathers; Andre Young; Mike Elizondo; Mark Batson; Chris Pope	Dr. Dre	4:19
3.	"Never Enough" (featuring 50 Cent and Nate Dogg)	Mathers; Young; Elizondo; Curtis Jackson; Nathaniel Hale	Dr. Dre; Elizondo	2:39
4.	"Yellow Brick Road"	Mathers; Luis Resto; Steve King	Eminem; Resto^{[a]}	5:46
5.	"Like Toy Soldiers"	Mathers; Resto; Marta Marrero; Michael Jay Margules	Eminem; Resto^{[a]}	4:56
6.	"Mosh"	Mathers; Young; Elizondo; Mark Batson; Pope	Dr. Dre; Batson	5:17
7.	"Puke"	Mathers; Resto; King; Brian May	Eminem; Resto^{[a]}	4:07
8.	"My 1st Single"	Mathers; Resto	Eminem; Resto^{[a]}	5:02
9.	"Paul" (skit)			0:32
10.	"Rain Man"	Mathers; Young; Elizondo; Batson; Pope	Dr. Dre	5:14
11.	"Big Weenie"	Mathers; Young; Elizondo; Batson; Pope	Dr. Dre	4:26
12.	"Em Calls Paul" (skit)			1:11
13.	"Just Lose It"	Mathers; Young; Elizondo; Batson; Pope	Dr. Dre; Elizondo	4:08
14.	"Ass Like That"	Mathers; Young; Elizondo; Batson; Pope	Dr. Dre; Elizondo	4:25
15.	"Spend Some Time" (featuring Obie Trice, Stat Quo and 50 Cent)	Mathers; Resto; Obie Trice; Stanley Benton; Curtis Jackson; King; Gary Wright	Eminem; Resto^{[a]}	5:10
16.	"Mockingbird"	Mathers; Resto	Eminem; Resto^{[a]}	4:10
17.	"Crazy in Love"	Mathers; Resto; Ann Wilson; Nancy Wilson; Roger Fisher	Eminem; Resto^{[a]}	4:02
18.	"One Shot 2 Shot" (featuring D12)	Mathers; Resto; Ondre Moore; Von Carlisle; Denaun Porter; Rufus Johnson	Eminem; Resto^{[a]}	4:26
19.	"Final Thought" (skit)			0:30
20.	"Encore" / "Curtains Down" (featuring Dr. Dre and 50 Cent)	Mathers; Young; Elizondo; Batson; Pope; Jackson	Dr. Dre; Batson	5:48
Total length:				77:06

Deluxe edition disc two
No.	Title	Writer(s)	Producer(s)	Length
1.	"We as Americans"	Mathers; Resto	Eminem; Resto	4:36
2.	"Love You More"	Mathers; Resto	Eminem; Resto	4:44
3.	"Ricky Ticky Toc"	Mathers; Resto; King	Eminem; Resto	2:49
Total length:				89:16

Notes

- ^{^[a]} signifies an additional producer.
- "Love You More" and the original version of "We As Americans" were leaked in 2003 in the bootleg album "Straight From The Lab".
- Dr. Dre has cameo appearances in "Rain Man", "Just Lose It", and "Ass Like That". His appearance in "Rain Man" is sampled from the intro of the 2000 Eminem song "Bitch Please II".
- Fatt Father has a cameo appearance on "One Shot 2 Shot".
- "Like Toy Soldiers" contains a sample of Martika from her 1989 song "Toy Soldiers".
- "Crazy In Love" contains a sample of Ann Wilson from Heart's 1976 song "Crazy on You".
- "Curtains Down" is a skit at the end of "Encore", in which Eminem shoots everyone at his concert and then shoots himself, followed by a robotic voice saying "See you in hell, fuckers." Some of the pictures in the booklet make reference to this.
- The robotic voice heard on "Em Calls Paul" and in the "Curtains Down" skit is Eminem speaking with an electrolarynx.

== Personnel ==
Credits are adapted from the album's liner notes.

- Mike Elizondo – keyboards (tracks: 2, 3, 6, 10, 11, 13, 14 and 20); guitar (tracks 6, 11, 13 and 20); sitar (track 14)
- Steve King – guitar (tracks: 4, 5, 7, 15, 17 and 18); bass (tracks: 4, 5, 7 and 17); mandolin (track 4); keyboards (track 11)
- Luis Resto – keyboards (tracks: 2, 4, 5, 7, 8, 15, 16, 17, 18 and 20)
- Mark Batson – keyboards on (tracks: 2, 6, 10, 11, 13 and 20); bass on (track 14)
- Che Vicious – programming (track 20)

== Charts ==
=== Weekly charts ===
Chart (2004–2005)	Peak position
Australian Albums (ARIA)	1
Australian Hip-Hop/R&B Albums (ARIA)	1
Austrian Albums (Ö3 Austria)	2
Belgian Albums (Ultratop Flanders)	2
Belgian Albums (Ultratop Wallonia)	8
Canadian Albums (Billboard)	1
Canadian R&B Albums (Nielsen SoundScan)	1
Danish Albums (Hitlisten)	2
Dutch Albums (Album Top 100)	2
European Albums (Billboard)	1
Finnish Albums (Suomen virallinen lista)	4
French Albums (SNEP)	1
German Albums (Offizielle Top 100)	1
Greek Albums (IFPI)	3
Hungarian Albums (MAHASZ)	24
Icelandic Albums (Tónlist)	13
Irish Albums (IRMA)	1
Italian Albums (FIMI)	6
Japanese Albums (Oricon)	3
Malaysian International Albums (RIM)	6
New Zealand Albums (RMNZ)	1
Norwegian Albums (VG-lista)	2
Polish Albums (ZPAV)	9
Portuguese Albums (AFP)	8
Scottish Albums (Official Charts)	2
South African Albums (RISA)	1
Spanish Albums (PROMUSICAE)	3
Swedish Albums (Sverigetopplistan)	2
Swiss Albums (Schweizer Hitparade)	1
Taiwanese Albums (Five Music)	5
UK Albums (Official Charts)	1
UK R&B Albums (Official Charts)	1
US Billboard 200	1
US Top Rap Albums (Billboard)	1
US Top R&B/Hip-Hop Albums (Billboard)	1

Chart (2013)	Peak position
US Top Catalog Albums (Billboard)	21

Chart (2024)	Peak position
Nigerian Albums (TurnTable)	61

=== Year-end charts ===
Chart (2004)	Position
Australian Albums (ARIA)	18
Australian Hip Hop/R&B Albums (ARIA)	3
Austrian Albums (Ö3 Austria)	46
Belgian Albums (Ultratop Flanders)	44
Belgian Albums (Ultratop Wallonia)	58
Danish Albums (Hitlisten)	27
Dutch Albums (Album Top 100)	53
Finnish Albums (Suomen viralinen lista)	10
French Albums (SNEP)	31
German Albums (Offizielle Top 100)	62
Irish Albums (IRMA)	11
Italian Albums (FIMI)	47
Japanese Albums (Oricon)	72
New Zealand Albums (RMNZ)	17
Swedish Albums (Sverigetopplistan)	58
Swedish Albums & Compilations (Sverigetopplistan)	77
Swiss Albums (Schweizer Hitparade)	30
UK Albums (OCC)	15
US Billboard 200	96
US Top R&B/Hip-Hop Albums (Billboard)	61
Worldwide Albums (IFPI)	3

Chart (2005)	Position
Australian Albums (ARIA)	23
Australian Hip Hop/R&B Albums (ARIA)	3
Austrian Albums (Ö3 Austria)	39
Belgian Albums (Ultratop Flanders)	48
Danish Albums (Hitlisten)	56
Dutch Albums (Album Top 100)	65
European Albums (Billboard)	15
French Albums (SNEP)	151
German Albums (Offizielle Top 100)	37
Italian Albums (FIMI)	84
Japanese Albums (Oricon)	69
New Zealand Albums (RMNZ)	33
Swiss Albums (Schweizer Hitparade)	42
UK Albums (OCC)	72
US Billboard 200	2
US Top R&B/Hip-Hop Albums (Billboard)	4

Chart (2007)	Position
Australian Hip Hop/R&B Albums (ARIA)	34

Chart (2015)	Position
Australian Hip Hop/R&B Albums (ARIA)	81

Chart (2016)	Position
Australian Hip Hop/R&B Albums (ARIA)	74

Chart (2017)	Position
Australian Hip Hop/R&B Albums (ARIA)	75

Chart (2018)	Position
Australian Hip Hop/R&B Albums (ARIA)	68

Chart (2019)	Position
Australian Hip Hop/R&B Albums (ARIA)	80

=== Decade-end charts ===
Chart (2000–09)	Position
Australian Albums (ARIA)	78
US Billboard 200	40

== Certifications and sales ==
Region	Certification	Certified units/sales
Argentina (CAPIF)	Gold	20,000^{^}
Australia (ARIA)	8× Platinum	560,000^{‡}
Austria (IFPI Austria)	Platinum	30,000^{*}
Belgium (BRMA)	Gold	25,000^{*}
Denmark (IFPI Danmark)	4× Platinum	80,000^{‡}
Finland (Musiikkituottajat)	Gold	21,780
France (SNEP)	2× Gold	200,000^{*}
Germany (BVMI)	3× Gold	300,000^{‡}
Greece (IFPI Greece)	Gold	10,000^{^}
Ireland (IRMA)	5× Platinum	75,000^{^}
Italy (FIMI) sales since 2009	Gold	25,000^{‡}
Japan (RIAJ)	Platinum	250,000^{^}
Mexico (AMPROFON)	Gold	50,000^{^}
New Zealand (RMNZ)	6× Platinum	90,000^{‡}
Norway (IFPI Norway)	Platinum	40,000^{*}
Poland (ZPAV)	Gold	20,000^{*}
Portugal (AFP)	Silver	10,000^{^}
Russia (NFPF)	Platinum	20,000^{*}
South Africa (RISA)	Platinum	50,000^{*}
Spain (Promusicae)	Gold	50,000^{^}
Sweden (GLF)	Gold	30,000^{^}
Switzerland (IFPI Switzerland)	Platinum	40,000^{^}
United Kingdom (BPI)	4× Platinum	1,300,000
United States (RIAA)	5× Platinum	5,343,000
Summaries
Europe (IFPI)	2× Platinum	2,000,000^{*}
^{*} Sales figures based on certification alone.^{^} Shipments figures based on certification alone.^{‡} Sales+streaming figures based on certification alone.
