= Purp & Patron =

Mixtape by Game
- Released: January 24, 2011
- Recorded: 2008–2010
- Genres: Hip hop; gangsta rap
- Length: 2:00:59
- Label: BWS
- Producers: Pharrell Williams; Dr. Dre; Ervin 'EP' Pope; Bink; DJ Shake; Nottz; 1500 or Nothin'; Che Vicious; David D.A. Doman; Doug E. Fresh; Cool & Dre; RZA; Skeetox; Mike City; Raw Uncut; Denaun Porter; Miramolino; DJ Green Lantern; T-Pain; Travis Barker

Game chronology
Brake Lights (2010)	Purp & Patron (2011)	Hoodmorning (notypo): Candy Coronas (2011)

Purp & Patron is the tenth and eleventh mixtape and the first double disc mixtape by West Coast rapper Game released as a free online download on January 24, 2011. The mixtape is hosted by DJ Skee and Funkmaster Flex. The mixtape's production was handled by several record producers, including Dr. Dre, Ervin 'EP' Pope, the Neptunes, Bink, DJ Shake, Nottz, 1500 or Nothin', Che Vicious, David D.A. Doman, Cool & Dre, RZA, Mike City, Raw Uncut, Denaun Porter, Miramolino, DJ Green Lantern, and Travis Barker, among others.

Features on the mixtape include Pharrell Williams, Snoop Dogg, Lil Wayne, Mistah F.A.B., Wiz Khalifa, Fabolous, Mysonne, T-Pain, Rick Ross, Ashanti, Kurupt, Lil Boosie, Jim Jones, Clinton Sparks, Swizz Beatz, Travis Barker, Doug E. Fresh, Big Daddy Kane, Bun B and KRS-One.

Upon its release, the mixtape was critically acclaimed as an internet download success, with over 200,000 copies downloaded in just one day. In an interview with Rolling Stone, Game stated that he had his associates checking on the mixtape's status and he stated that they now we're close to 1.1 million downloads in three days with all the sites combined. An additional third disc, titled Purp & Patron: The Hangover, was released on January 31, 2011.

== Background ==
While awaiting an exact release date for his fourth studio album The R.E.D. Album, Game decided to release his third mixtape titled Purp & Patron. The mixtape was set out for his fans while he continued to prep for his fourth studio release. On January 7, 2011 Game leaked the cover art to the mixtape and confirmed that he would release it. After the release of the mixtape Game was asked how long it took him to make the mixtape he stated that the mixtape took him about seven days to put it all together.

== Controversy ==
It was reported that rapper RZA, who produced Game's Heartbreaker track, was issuing a cease-and-desist order over the track. Later RZA cleared up the controversy in an interview with RapFix affiliate and Wake Up Show host King Tech saying "...I COULD NEVER TAKE GAME TO COURT... I LOVE THAT DUDE..."

== Reception ==
=== Critical response ===
Professional ratings
Review scores
Source	Rating
Los Angeles Times	(favorable)
PopMatters	(4/10)
Rolling Stone	3.5/5 stars
Vibe	(favorable)
DJBooth.net	3.5/5 stars

Los Angeles Times writer Jeff Weiss noted on the mixtapes music that it's "Combined and scattered amid all the compulsive name-drops, '93 West Coast posturing and abhorrent Kardashian family drops, is something very good. Maybe not as excellent as his steroid-era classic, The Documentary, or the jilted lunacy of Doctor's Advocate, but rock solid nonetheless. Far from revolutionary, but a nice addition to a deceptively estimable catalog". Giving it a 3.5 out of 5 stars Rolling Stone writer Jody Rosen cited it as something that fans of Game "never quite experienced from him: fun" also commenting on Game's music that "The beats, by everyone from the Neptunes to Dr. Dre, are taut and funky, but the Game's charisma holds center stage". Vibe writer Mikey Fresh stated that "While Game's highly anticipated R.E.D. Album seems to be on its way to becoming Detox Jr., Chuck Taylor throws two dishes worth of hors d'oeuvres in the form of Purp & Patron, to wet [sic] our appetites until the arrival of the full course meal". Giving it a 4 out of 10 rating, David Amidon of PopMatters criticized the way Game name-drops stating that "brands, cars, other rappers, their parents, their siblings, neighborhoods, actors, directors, homeless people, flight attendants, police officers, EMTs, waiters, bitties in the BK lounge, and really just about any name that comes to his mind" and "in his eagerness to do this shit, he almost always loses track of where he started a verse". Nathan Slavik of DJBooth.net gave the project an "Above Average" review, stating, "None of these tracks are hits, but they certainly indicate that a hitmaker still lurks underneath that face tattoo."

== Track listing ==
Disc 1 (Purp)
No.	Title	Original instrumental/Producer(s)	Length
1.	"L.A. Times"	Ervin 'EP' Pope	4:17
2.	"In My '64" (featuring Pharrell and Snoop Dogg)	Pharrell Williams	3:16
3.	"Soo Woo" (featuring Lil Wayne)	Bink	4:52
4.	"Living Better Now" (featuring Detail and Toolez)	"Living Better Now" by Jamie Foxx	4:09
5.	"R.I.P. Story"	Nottz	3:44
6.	"Purp & Patron" (featuring Menace, TD and Sam Hook)	DJ Shake	3:58
7.	"I'm the King (Remix)" (featuring Mistah F.A.B. and the Jacka)	1500 or Nothin'	5:03
8.	"Taylor Made" (Featuring Wiz Khalifa)	Che Vicious	3:50
9.	"Children's Story"	Ervin 'EP' Pope	3:53
10.	"Dead"	1500 or Nothin'	3:32
11.	"Ferrari Lifestyle" (Featuring Fabolous)	David D.A. Doman	3:26
12.	"The Kill"	Cool & Dre	4:23
13.	"Heart Breaker" (featuring Rev. Burke)	RZA	3:56
14.	"Purp & Yellow (Skeemix)" (Featuring Snoop Dogg and Wiz Khalifa)	Skeetox	2:54

Disc 2 (Patron)
No.	Title	Producer(s)	Length
1.	"Burn NY" (Featuring Mysonne)	Mike City	5:01
2.	"Bad Intentions"	"Recognize a Playa" by Boss Hogg Outlawz	3:11
3.	"Khaki Suit" (Featuring T-Pain)	T-Pain	2:33
4.	"Wonderful World"	DJ Shake	3:06
5.	"Ashes to Ashes" (Featuring Rick Ross)		2:34
6.	"Dedicated" (Featuring Pharrell)	Pharrell	3:12
7.	"Soft Rhodes" (Featuring Ashanti)	Dr. Dre	3:46
8.	"I Just Want to Fuck" (Feat. Kurupt)	Mr. Porter	3:04
9.	"187" (Featuring Lil Boosie)	Ervin 'EP' Pope	3:59
10.	"Whip It" (Featuring Fabolous)	Miramolino	3:29
11.	"Favorite DJ" (Remix) (featuring Jim Jones, Bun B and Clinton Sparks)	DJ Green Lantern	5:12
12.	"Supastar" (Featuring Mike Epps and Ashley Cole)	Ervin 'EP' Pope	5:34
13.	"Can a Drummer Get Some" (Travis Barker featuring the Game, Lil Wayne, Rick Ross and Swizz Beatz)	Travis Barker	3:21
14.	"History" (Featuring Big Daddy Kane, KRS-One and Doug E. Fresh)	Ervin 'EP' Pope, Doug E. Fresh	6:07
15.	"The Ocean" (featuring Dr. Dre)	Dr. Dre, Che Vicious	4:34

Purp & Patron: The Hangover
No.	Title	Producer(s)	Length
1.	"The Hangover" (Featuring Famous Fresh)	Mars	3:48
2.	"California"	Mars	5:15
3.	"Yung Stunna" (Featuring Birdman)	Mars	3:12
4.	"Violin"	Mars	3:56
5.	"Sex" (Performed by Jellyroll)	Jellyroll	1:05
6.	"White Soft Porn" (Featuring Asher Roth, Tyga and Mars)	Mars; Renz	3:18
7.	"Get Familiar" (Featuring Timbaland)	Timbaland	3:22
8.	"Lost" (featuring K-Young)	Antwan "Amadeus" Thompson	3:53
9.	"I'm Home" (Featuring Kurupt)	Mars	4:17
10.	"This Way" (Featuring JoiStaRR)	Mars	3:36
11.	"3D" (Featuring David Banner)	Mars	3:06
12.	"Drama" (Ghostface Killah featuring Joell Ortiz and the Game)	Sean C & LV	4:24
13.	"Lovebirds"	"The Bakers Dozen" by Xzibit	2:19
14.	"Philly Mega Mix" (Featuring Young Chris, Eve, Black Thought, Money Malc, Fat Joe, Fred the Godson, Diggy Simmons and Jermaine Dupri)	Rico Love; Earl & E	7:52
15.	"Undefeated" (Featuring Busta Rhymes and Marsha Ambrosius)	Just Blaze	4:29
