= Che Pope =

American record executive

- Also known as: Chris Pope; Che "Guevara" Pope; Che Vicious; Che Fuego 3000
- Born: May 3, 1970 (age 56)
- Origin: Boston, Massachusetts, U.S.
- Genre: Hip hop
- Occupations: Record producer; songwriter; record executive
- Labels: GOOD; Aftermath; Warner Bros.
- Website: youthrule.com

Christopher Pope (born May 3, 1970) is an American record executive and record producer from Boston, Massachusetts. Pope served as co-executive producer on Kanye West's album Yeezus (2013), and co-producer on Lauryn Hill's The Miseducation of Lauryn Hill (1998). He was president and chief operating officer (COO) of West's record label GOOD Music from 2012 to 2015, and won Album of the Year at the 41st Annual Grammy Awards for his work on the latter album.

Pope was credited with co-production on West's Grammy-nominated 2013 single "Bound 2", and executive production on GOOD Music's compilation album Cruel Summer (2012). He is also the founder of Wrkshp Media.

== Career ==
Pope entered the music industry in 1994 upon signing to Teddy Riley, after Riley was introduced to Pope's instrumentals via a mutual friend. In 1995, Pope relocated to New York where he began producing for Wyclef Jean and his group, the Fugees. He also contributed to Jean's production works, which included the hit singles "No, No, No Part 2" by Destiny's Child, "Ghetto Supastar (That Is What You Are)" by Pras, and "Gone Til November" by Jean himself. While working with Jean, Pope was introduced to Lauryn Hill, who invited him to produce and write with her on several projects including Aretha Franklin's "A Rose Is Still A Rose", Carlos Santana's "Do You Like The Way", The Miseducation of Lauryn Hill, and more. Pope's production on The Miseducation of Lauryn Hill earned him his first Grammy win. Due to improper crediting and compensation, several lawsuits stemmed from the project. Pope and his then co-producer opted not involve themselves in the ongoing litigation surrounding the album, but parted ways with the production team to pursue independent efforts.

After his time working with Hill, Pope produced projects in both domestic and foreign markets. In 1999, he became Vice President of A&R at Warner Bros. Records. Pope later moved to Los Angeles to explore film composition, and was hired by composer Hans Zimmer as a staff producer. This led to credits on several films, television shows and commercials.

Pope was then introduced to Dr. Dre through a mutual friend, and subsequently offered a position on the latter's immediate production team, with whom he collaborated for eight years. Pope worked on projects for Afterrmath artists including Eminem and 50 Cent. In an interview, Pope estimated that he had produced over 1,000 unreleased tracks for Dre and Aftermath during his tenure with the label.

In 2012, Pope joined GOOD Music as a partner, as well as head of A&R. In addition to his administrative work for the label, Pope continued to produce for the label's signed artists. In 2014, he was named Chief Operations Officer of the label. Pope also established the initial collaborative relationship between West and apparel company Adidas, the then-distributor of the Yeezy clothing line. Pope co-produced ASAP Rocky's song "Jukebox Joints", which appears on Rocky's album At. Long. Last. ASAP (2015) and the Weeknd's single "Tell Your Friends" that same year, which appears on the latter's Beauty Behind the Madness. Both songs were co-produced with West.

== Production credits ==
=== 1990s ===
==== 1997 ====
- Wyclef Jean - The Carnival
- M People - Fresco
- Destiny's Child - "No, No, No Part 2"

==== 1998 ====
- Lauryn Hill - The Miseducation of Lauryn Hill
- Aretha Franklin - A Rose is Still a Rose
- Pras - Ghetto Supastar

==== 1999 ====
- Santana - Supernatural
- Mary J. Blige - Mary

=== 2000s ===
==== 2002 ====
- Beverly Knight - Who I Am

==== 2004 ====
- Eminem - Encore
- Eminem - "Ass Like That"
- Eminem - "Just Lose It"

==== 2005 ====
- The Game - "Hate It or Love It"
- The Game - The Documentary
- 50 Cent - The Massacre
- Vivian Green - Vivian

==== 2006 ====
- Mobb Deep - Blood Money
- Busta Rhymes - The Big Bang
- Jay-Z - Kingdom Come
- India.Arie - Testimony: Vol. 1, Life & Relationship

==== 2008 ====
- Bishop Lamont - The Confessional
- RZA (as Bobby Digital) - Digi Snacks

==== 2009 ====
- Raekwon - Only Built 4 Cuban Linx... Pt. II

=== 2010s ===
==== 2010 ====
- Stat Quo - Statlanta

==== 2011 ====
- Game - Purp & Patron
- Game - Hoodmorning (No Typo): Candy Coronas

==== 2012 ====
- G.O.O.D. Music - Kanye West Presents: G.O.O.D. Music - Cruel Summer exec prod
- responsible for "Mercy"

==== 2013 ====
- Pusha T - My Name is My Name
- Kanye West - Yeezus exec prod
- Kanye West - "Bound 2"

==== 2014 ====
- Teyana Taylor - VII

==== 2015 ====
- The Weeknd - Beauty Behind the Madness
- A$AP Rocky - At. Long. Last. A$AP.
- Pusha T - King Push — Darkest Before Dawn: The Prelude
- Kanye West - "All Day"

==== 2018 ====
- Christina Aguilera - Liberation
- Teyana Taylor - K.T.S.E.
- Kanye West - Ye
- Nas - Nasir

=== 2020s ===
==== 2022 ====
- Brent Faiyaz - WASTELAND - FYTB

==== 2024 ====
- ¥$ - Vultures 1
- Future - Mixtape Pluto

==== 2025 ====
- The Weeknd - Hurry Up Tomorrow
- Kanye West - Cuck (unreleased)
- King Combs - Never Stop (uncredited)

==== 2026 ====
- Kanye West - Bully (as part of 2 Vicious)

== Awards ==
=== Grammy Awards ===
Year	Nominee / Work	Award	Result
1999	Lauryn Hill - "Miseducation of Lauryn Hill"	Album of the Year	Won
2014	Kanye West - "Bound 2"	Best Rap Song	Nominated
2015	Kanye West - "All Day"	Best Rap Song	Nominated
2015	The Weeknd - Beauty Behind the Madness	Best Urban Contemporary Album	Won
