= Mike Smith (American record producer) =

Record producer

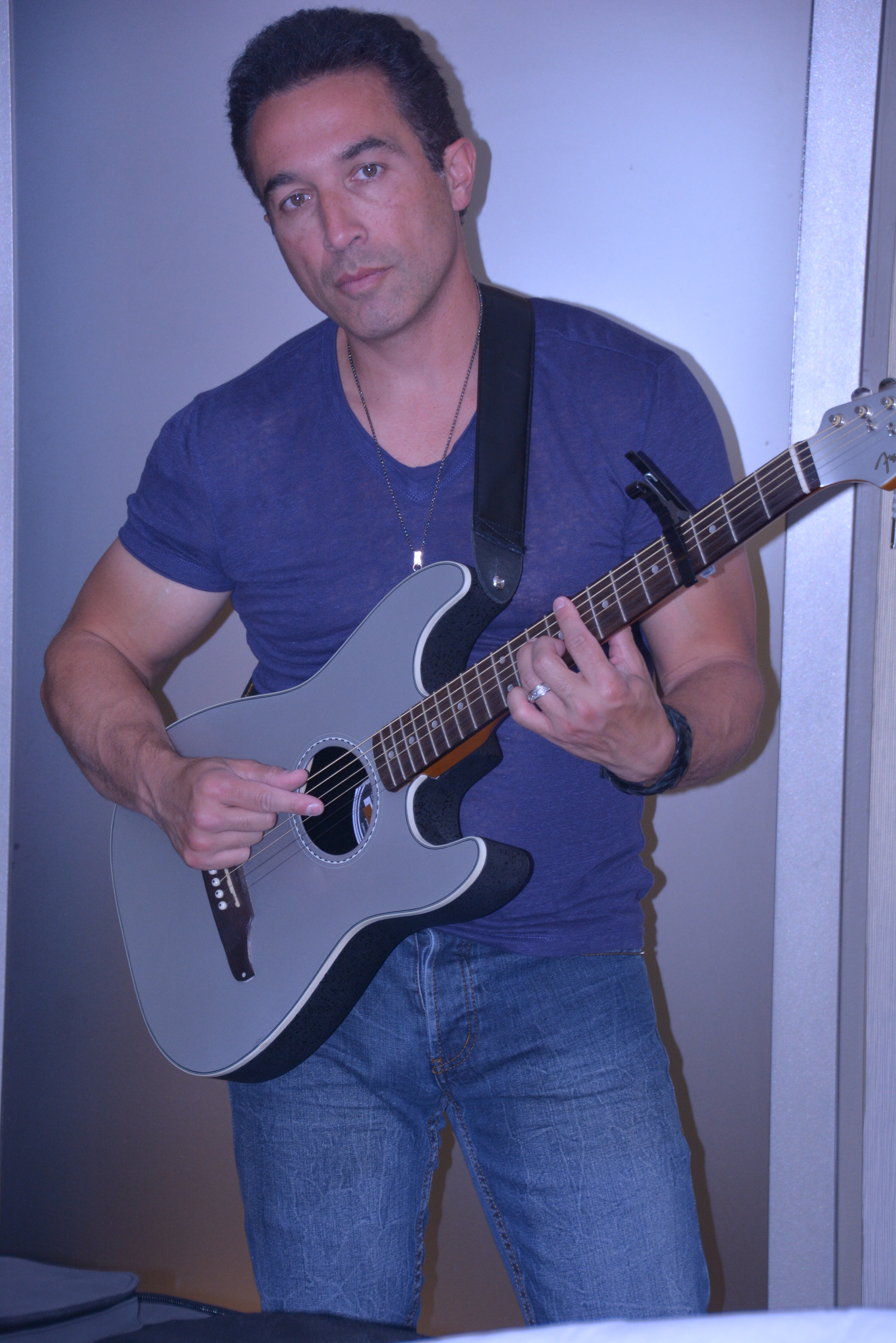
- Occupations: Entrepreneur, recording artist, author, television personality
- Years active: 2013–present
- Notable credit(s): Snoop Dogg Billy Ray Cyrus Sway Calloway DJ Khaled, Crooked I, Tech N9ne, Cyhi The Prynce, DJ Whoo Kid, Twista, RZA and Inspectah Deck of Wu Tang Clan, DMC (Run DMC), Gilby Clarke (Guns N' Roses)
- Spouse: Erika Smith

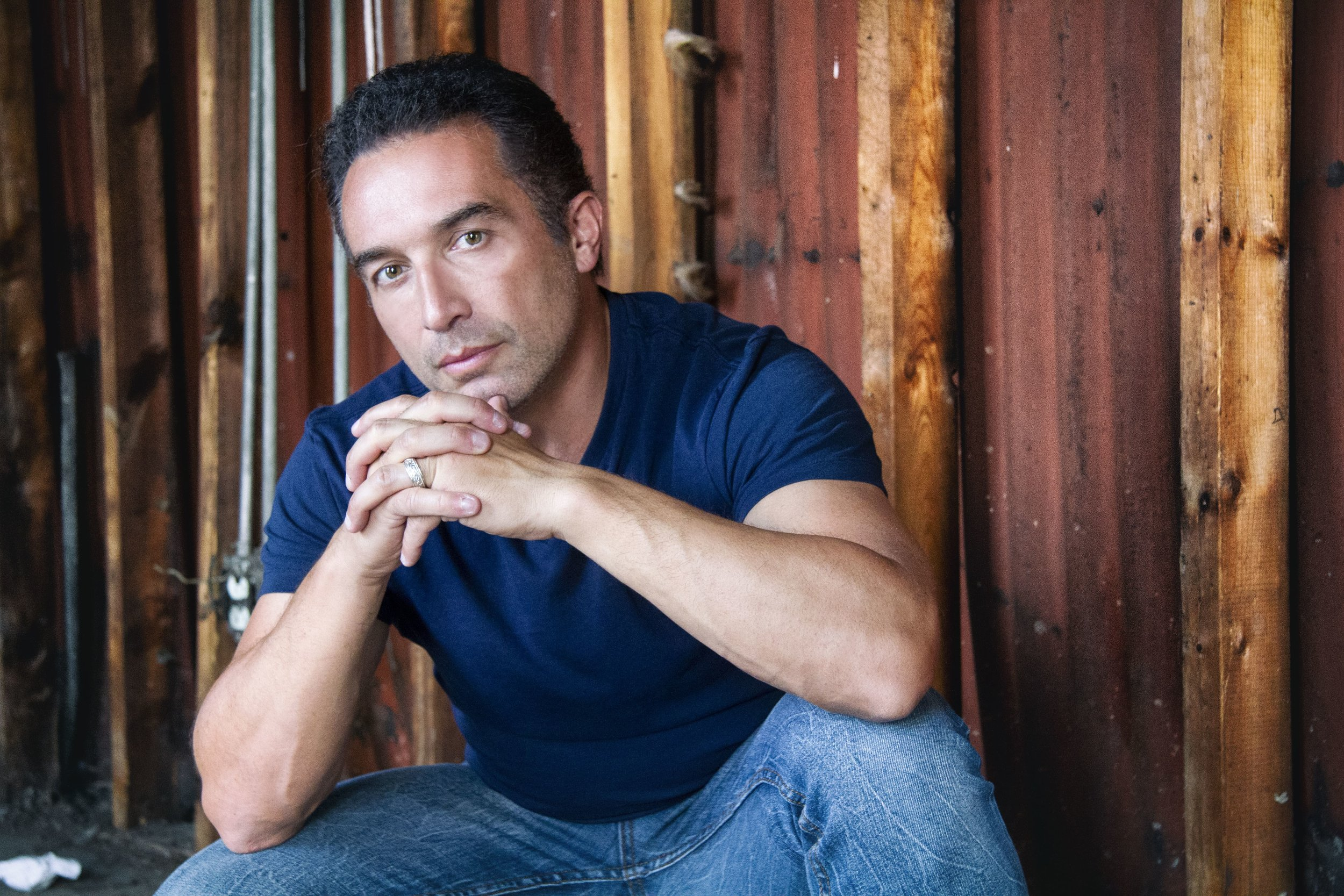

Mike Smith is a Cuban American recording artist, record and television producer. His music has over two billion streams with over five million units sold. He was arrested in September 2024 for allegedly earning royalties from streaming services by using bot accounts to stream his own songs.

Smith is known for being one of the stars and main judge on BET's original programming series One Shot and for co-writing the hit song "A Hard Working Man" by Snoop Dogg, Billy Ray Cyrus, and the Avila Brothers. This song has been featured on NFL Thursday Night Primetime and CBS NFL Today. He is also well known for numerous hit singles including the Top 5 Billboard hit "Beautiful Day" and Billboard Top 40 hits "Hardworking Man" and "You're My Kind Of Beautiful".

Smith has worked with many artists, including Snoop Dogg, Billy Ray Cyrus, DJ Khaled, T.I., Juicy J, Royce Da 5'9', Remy Ma, and Gilby Clarke of Guns N' Roses.

== Personal life ==
Smith first made his fortune in the 1990s when he was only 23 years old with an IT business where he wrote one of the main fixes for the Y2K millennium software bug. He then built, bought, and sold three regional chains of medical practices.

Smith is married to Erika Smith, a choreographer and dancer, who is also one of the executive producers of One Shot. She also danced in one of Inspectah Deck of the Wu-Tang Clan's music videos. The couple has six children together.

== Career ==
In 2013 Mike Smith, along with Jonathan Hay, co-founded SMH Records, a music label out of Charlotte, North Carolina, with Caroline Distribution a division of Capitol Music Group. Nigerian heiress Bim Fernandez signed with SMH in November 2013, becoming part of the Smith/Hay musical project Pink Grenade. Pink Grenade released an album in July 2014, accompanied by four singles that supposedly gathered millions of views online. Guest rappers Crooked I, Troy Ave, Dizzy Wright and Royce da 5'9" were featured on four songs. In August 2014 the record label offered $15 million to Jay Z to produce his next album. Smith stated to HipHopDX "I will write Jay Z a check for $15 million today as an advance for us to produce an album for him." In 2015 Smith was a performer and producer for the studio album When Music Worlds Collide that was profiled on Fox News, Business Insider and Billboard. He was awarded Rising Artist by Jay Z's music streaming service Tidal. The deluxe version of the album added collaborations with notable hip-hop artists, and was released in 2016.

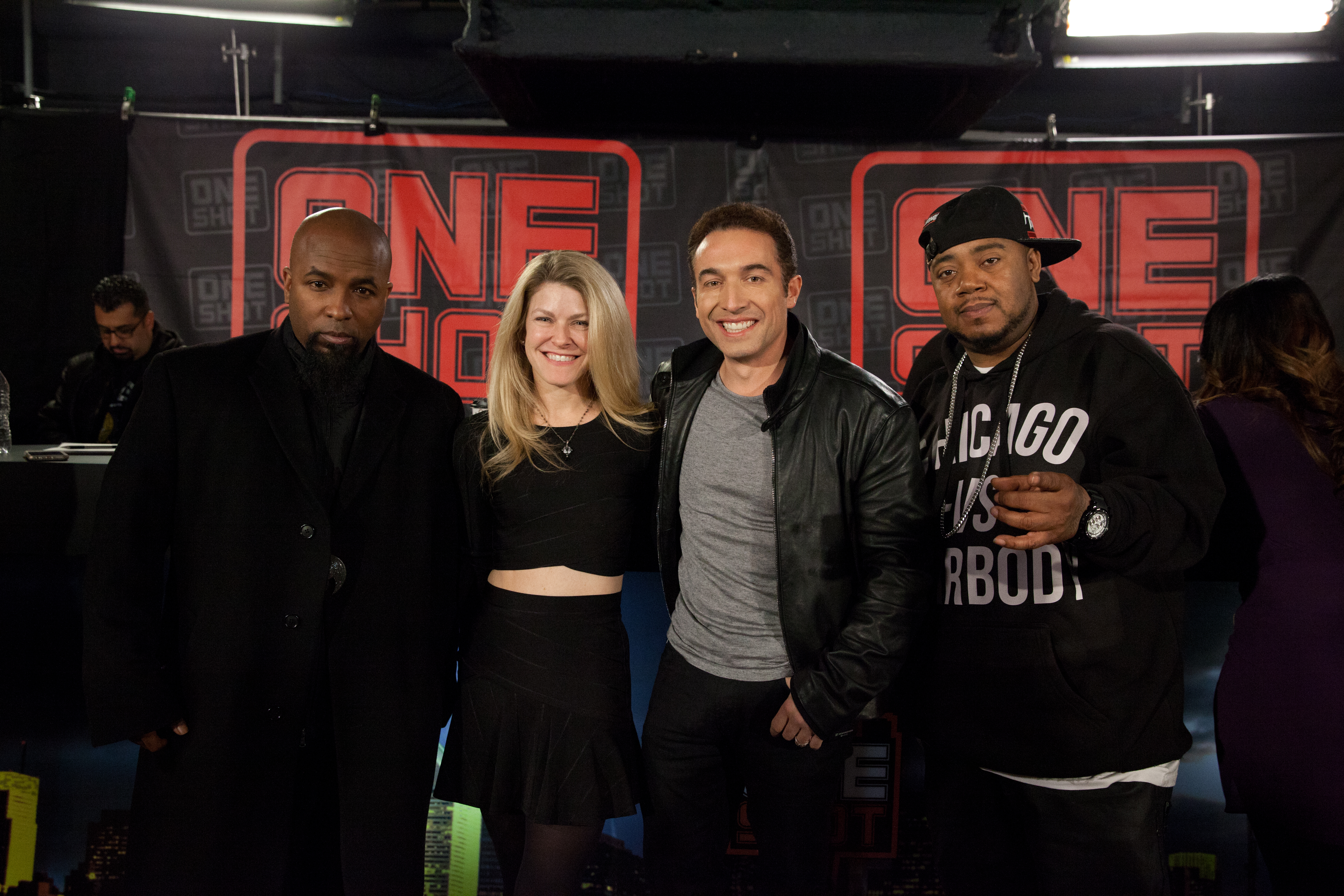
Mike Smith and Erika Smith with Tech N9ne and Twista on set of BET One Shot

In 2016 Smith and his wife were executive producers of "BET's One Shot" the hip-hop lyrical competition series hosted by Sway Calloway and also starring Smith. The show debuted on BET on August 16, 2016, and also starred DJ Khaled, TI, RZA, and Twista. Smith's debut album Always You And Me was number 7 on the Billboard Heatseekers chart, number 47 on the Billboard New Artist album chart, and number 67 on the Billboard 200. His book, Lovin' Each Day, became an Amazon bestseller. Billboard premiered "Lost Souls" the single he co-produced for Orlando massacre survivor Patience Carter, Nitty Scott and Iliana Eve.

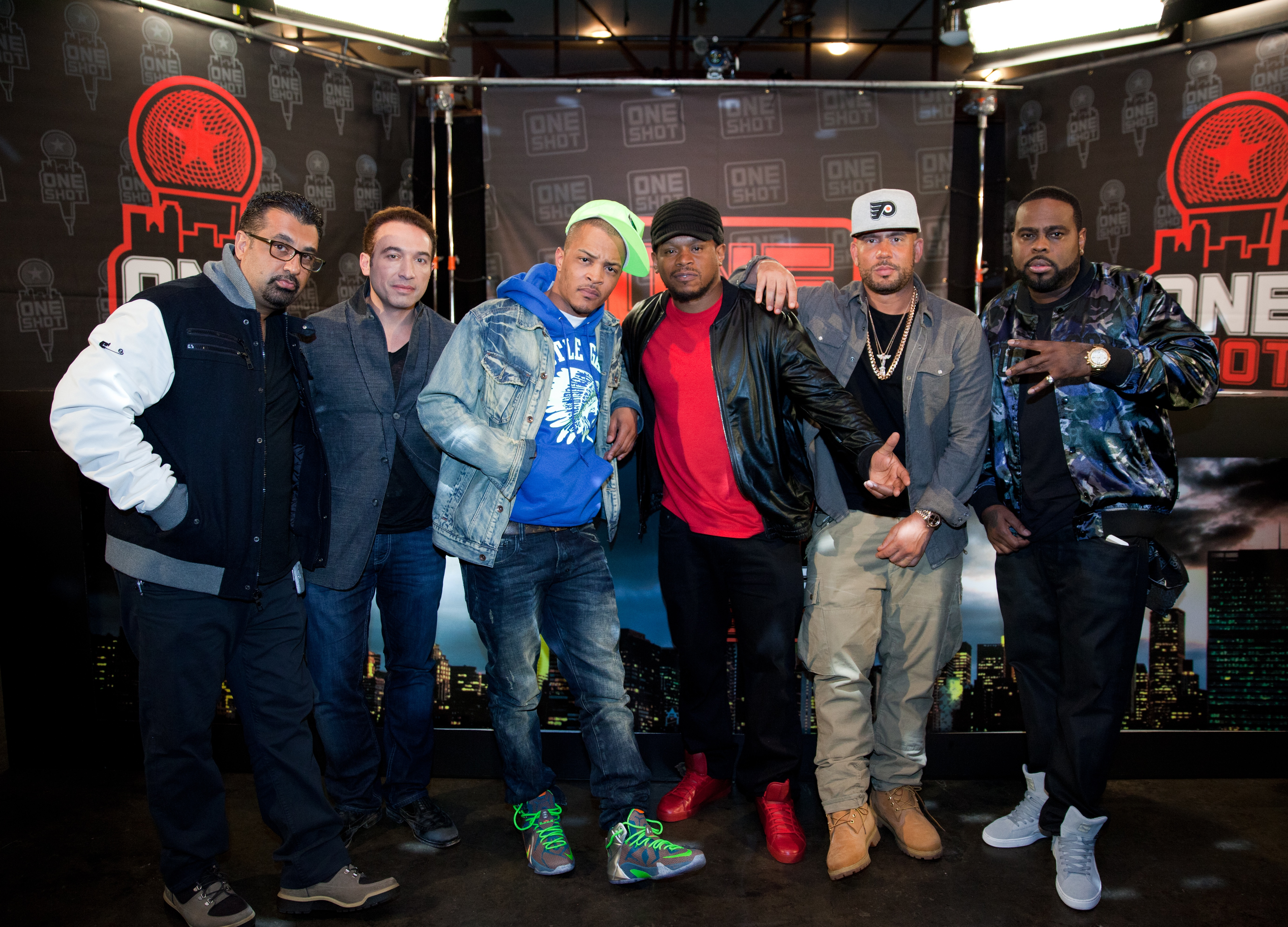
Mike Smith with TI, Sway Calloway, King Tech, King Crooked, and DJ Drama on set of BET One Shot

Smith released the single "Alibi" with Chanel Sosa, RZA and Tech from the album Smith Hay & the Blue Notes. Smith worked with other Wu-Tang Clan member Inspectah Deck on the single "Daddy's Little Girl".

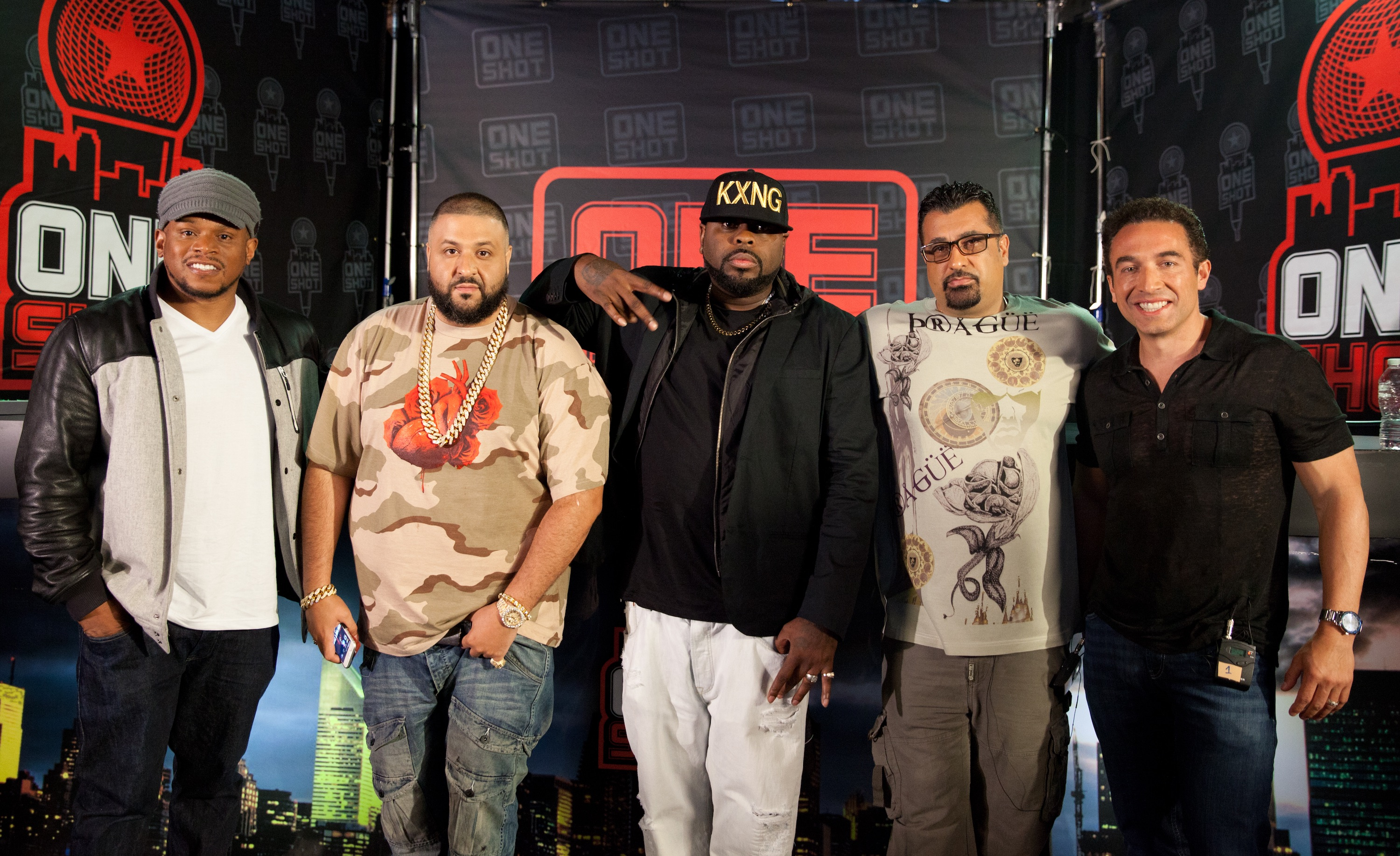
Mike Smith with DJ Khaled, Sway Calloway, King Tech, and King Crooked on set of BET One Shot

On December 30, 2017, Smith's second solo album, Pieces of my Soul, reached number 5 on the Billboard Heatseekers, Number 1 on the Billboard Heatseekers South Central, Number 1 on the Billboard Heatseekers South Atlantic, and Number 48 on the Independent Album Chart.

Smith's duo Smith and Hay reached number 1 on the Billboard Jazz Album chart for the week of January 20, 2018.

Smith's duo Smith and Hay released the album The Whoodlum Ball with DJ Whoo Kid on May 11, 2018. The week of May 26, 2018, this album hit number 1 on the Billboard Heatseekers Chart, Number 9 on the Billboard Rap Album Chart, Number 11 on the Billboard Independent Album Chart, Number 16 on the Billboard Digital Album Chart, Number 54 on the Billboard Album Chart, and Number 156 on the Billboard 200 Chart.

On September 15, Smith peaked at number 5 on the Billboard Charts with the single "Beautiful Day".

On December 15, 2018, Billboard 's Year End Charts were released. Smith's single "Beautiful Day" was the 33rd biggest song of the year on the Billboard Christian Streaming Year End Chart.

In 2019, Smith was one of the producers of Juicy J's moderate hit "Don't You Wanna". On July 15 Jazz Part Two was released and hit No. 1 on the Billboard Contemporary Jazz Charts. On July 26, Smith released Follow the Leader, a cover of Eric B. & Rakim's album in the style of jazz with Jonathan Hay and Benny Reid that hit No. 1 on the Billboard Jazz Charts and was up for Grammy consideration.

On January 17, 2020, Smith released the album "Somewhere In The Middle". On March 14, 2020, the first single "Hardworking Man" from the album "Somewhere In The Middle" hit number 25 on the Billboard Rock Chart.

On January 26, 2021, Smith became a brand ambassador for AMS Neve helping to promote the brand new Neve 8424 console.

On April 1, 2022, Smith's song "Hardworking Man" was recreated by Snoop Dogg, Billy Ray Cyrus, and the Avila Brothers and renamed "A Hard Working Man". Mike is listed as a co writer on the song.

On July 10, 2022, it was announced that Smith and RZA would be executive producers of the feature film Nyctophia, and Smith would be music supervisor as well.

On October 6, 2022, Smith's song "A Hard Working Man", a song he co wrote with Snoop Dogg, Billy Ray Cyrus, and the Avila Brothers was featured on Thursday Night NFL Primetime. On October 24, 2022 “A Hard Working Man” was featured in the CBS Sports Special Highlighting the League’s Tight Ends, on Sunday, as the lyrics celebrate the grind, toughness and grit that the tight end offers their team.

On December 15, 2022, it was announced that Smith’s SMH Records signed a production deal with Island of Misfits Media to create the animated series “Death Travelers".

On July 24, 2024, Mike Smith, under the name "Niosmith", released the single "Take Me To The Edge" featuring Snoop Dogg. The song was written by Mike Smith and produced by The Avila Brothers and Mike Smith. Niosmith is a two man band with Mike Smith on lead vocals, guitar, bass guitar, and piano and Nioshi Jackson on Drums. This song was the first song released in conjunction with the mobile video game and animated series “Death Travelers".
