= The Urban Hitchcock LP =

The Urban Hitchcock LP, Deluxe: The Urban Hitchcock LP

Studio album by Jonathan Hay
- Released: March 2016, August 2016 (Deluxe)
- Recorded: Louisville, Kentucky
- Genre: Hip hop
- Label: Indie
- Producer: Jonathan Hay

Jonathan Hay chronology
When Music Worlds Collide (2015)	The Urban Hitchcock LP, Deluxe: The Urban Hitchcock LP (2016)	Mountain Biking Through Louisville with DJ Whoo Kid (2016)

The Urban Hitchcock LP is the debut studio album from Jonathan Hay and features notable names in the hip-hop genre. Jonathan Hay is an outspoken veteran producer and publicist. The deluxe version, Deluxe: The Urban Hitchcock LP was released in August 2016.

== Background ==
Released in March 2016, The Urban Hitchcock LP is controversial in nature, as Hay goes after artists Action Bronson and Statik Selektah on a skit titled "The Jerk." Hay later apologized to Kxng Crooked, Action Bronson, Statik Selektah and Vice Records for the parody skit, and said "I’m completely embarrassed by it now, as it’s truly comedy gone bad."

Kanye West's GOOD Music artist, Cyhi The Prynce is featured on the album. Public Enemy member Professor Griff starts the album off and closes it with the topic of Jonathan Hay's adoption. Hay reunited with his biological birth parents through phone in 2015.

On the song "Johnny College", Hay addresses the University of Louisville basketball scandal. Hay was quoted as saying to CBS Sports, “To see Louisville get tarnished by a sex scandal is so disgusting and it breaks my heart, and that’s what inspired Johnny College."

"Don't Close Your Eyes" was the first single from the album and features Kxng Crooked of Slaughterhouse from Eminem's Shady Records. The song starts out with a voicemail to Hay from his biological mother Pamela Nicely. The song is about struggling with suicide thoughts and alcohol abuse. Kxng Crooked was quoted as saying to MTV News, “I’ve been in several dark places in my life, betrayed by those closest to me or feelings of hopelessness in situations I can’t control or even others trying to remove me from this earth. It takes its toll.”

Yahoo premiered Hay's second single "Dude Looks Like A Superstar" with Skyzoo and famed hip-hop visual artist Cey Adams that puts a twist on the 1998 hit, "Ghetto Superstar" borrowing the hook's melody from the Bee Gee's "Islands in the Stream."

"Hush" is the third single released and it features Chino XL and Frida Dee. Uproxx quoted Chino XL as saying, "‘Hush’ came from having a lot of moments being in dark places, with feelings of hopelessness and despair. It's a metaphor of addiction as a woman. When Jonathan Hay sent me the track and I heard the singing [from Frida Dee] and she sang about having to be quiet about an affair, immediately I thought about the affair of addiction. With the pianos and the tone of the music, it was kind of Folk in a weird way and it gave me inspiration to want to have a storytelling composition."

== Reviews ==
"It’s a doozy. Littered with top-tier names like Royce da 5'9", Cyhi the Prynce, Kxng Crooked and more, Urban Hitchcock is a quality-filled listen from top to bottom."

== Track listing ==
The Urban Hitchcock LP track listing and credits.

1. "The First Chapter (Bloodline)" feat Professor Griff
2. "You Yeah" feat Roy Demeno
3. "Paradise" feat Royce da 5'9", Kxng Crooked, Truth Ali
4. "Hush" feat Chino XL, Frida Dee, Ajami
5. "Addict (Part Two)" feat Canibus, Cyhi The Prynce, Frida Dee, Ajami
6. "Johnny College" feat Kxng Crooked, Chaz Ultra, Greyson & Jasun
7. "Black Pearl Jam" feat Frankie Carrera, Truth Ali, Chaz Ultra
8. "Dude Looks Like A Superstar" feat Skyzoo, Chaz Ultra, Truth Ali, Frida Dee, Ajami
9. "Don't Close Your Eyes" feat Kxng Crooked, Truth Ali, Morgan McRae, Frida Dee, Ajami, Frankie Carrera, Benny Reid, Ezkiel
10. "Does He Love You?" feat Planet Asia, Truth Ali, Frida Dee
11. "The Jerk"
12. "The Inkwell" feat Frankie Carrera, Truth Ali, Chaz Ultra, Frida Dee, Morgan McRae, Justinn Patton
13. "Call You" feat Canibus, Chaz Ultra
14. "Stop Thief" feat Bootleg from The Dayton Family, Jerome Brailey from Parliament Funkadelic, Truth Ali, Morgan McRae, Tony Chevy,
15. "A Prayer From Sweden" feat Chaz Ultra, Ajami
16. "Still Waiting (The Adoption)" feat Professor Griff, Mike Smith, King Tech
