= Good vs. Evil =

Good vs. Evil may refer to:

- Good vs. Evil (TV series), an American fantasy television series
- Good vs. Evil (album), the third studio album by American rapper KXNG Crooked (formerly known as Crooked I)
- Good vs. Evil II: The Red Empire, the sequel to the previous album by American rapper KXNG Crooked
- Conflict between good and evil

== See also ==
- Good and evil (disambiguation)
