= Pink Grenade =

American hip hop group

Background information
- Genre: Hip hop
- Years active: 2014
- Label: SMH Records

Pink Grenade was a nine-member musical group formed by Jonathan Hay and Mike Smith in 2014, featuring Nigerian heiress Bim Fernandez as vocalist, and including actor Johnny Depp, who avoided publicity along with the other anonymous bandmembers. The group released an album, Fear of a Pink Planet, in July 2014. The single "Let's Take It Naked" preceded the album in January 2014, followed by a controversial video uploaded in July which claimed more than 7.5 million views in its first week on Vevo and WorldStarHipHop. "Lights Out" was the second single, "Gold Blooded" was the third, and the fourth was "Lipstick", which asserted more than 5 million views on WorldStarHipHop. The album included guest appearances by rappers Crooked I, Troy Ave, Dizzy Wright and Royce da 5'9".

== Background ==
SMH Records was founded by record industry publicist Jonathan Hay and producer Mike Smith in 2013, based in Charlotte, North Carolina. The label's first artist was Nigerian singer Abimbola "Bim" Fernandez, the daughter of industrialist Antonio Deinde Fernandez, who was the richest man in Africa. Bim Fernandez, age 24, signed to SMH Records in November 2013, with the label paying for the production, not Fernandez. Pink Grenade was formed around Fernandez, with the other eight members staying anonymous. The band's first single was released in January 2014: "Let's Take It Naked". On July 1, 2014, a video for "Let's Take It Naked" was uploaded to Vevo and WorldStarHipHop, promoted with 7.5 million views in its first week. The "ironic" video showed fictional scenes of Fernandez partying with boys and cocaine, cooking meth, and playing Russian Roulette, all while showing a prominent pregnant belly – the belly was a prosthetic, Fernandez was not actually pregnant. The high number of online views was observed by Rob Hustle of Rebel Pundit to be possibly artificially inflated, as evidenced by the small number of viewer comments, many negative. "Let's Take It Naked" was partially mixed by Richard "Segal" Huredia, known for his work with Eminem and Dr. Dre.

The second single, "Lights Out", was released on July 17, featuring Royce da 5'9". The "moody" and "atmospheric" R&B/rap song was augmented with blues-style harmonica.

The third single, "Gold Blooded", was co-produced by Justin "Sky" Boller, released with a video on July 21. It claimed 2.5 million views on WorldStarHipHop.

A video for the hip-hop single "Lipstick", was released on July 23, 2014, featuring Fernandez singing and playing guitar. Ashlee Holmes, the daughter of Jacqueline Laurita, known for her appearance on The Real Housewives of New Jersey, is seen among a group of women playing with red lipstick and red paint. The "sexually charged" song has lyrics suggesting fellatio, as well as "dissing" Kim Kardashian and her family. "Lipstick" displayed 5 million views on WorldStarHipHop.

On July 24, 2014, Pink Grenade debuted the album Fear of a Pink Planet, with CD and vinyl copies sold through Best Buy, distributed by Caroline Records. The album's title is a play on the influential Public Enemy album Fear of a Black Planet (1990). All 18 of the songs on the album were written by Hay, except for "Lipstick" which was written by Hay, Fernandez and Cash Cash (deejays Samuel Frisch, Alexander Makhlouf and Jean Paul Makhlouf.) Guest rappers appear on four songs: "The Mirror" features Crooked I, "Famous as Fuck" features Troy Ave, "3 Days in LA" features Dizzy Wright, and "Lights Out" features Royce da 5'9". Parliament-Funkadelic drummer Jerome "Bigfoot" Brailey plays on some tracks.

In August 2014, many of the songs were re-released as The Famous as Fuck Tape, by Pink Grenade and DJ Whoo Kid.

== Fear of a Black Planet personnel ==
- Bim Fernandez – guitar, vocals, co-writing on "Lipstick"
- Johnny Depp
- Jonny
- Teddy
- Mekai
- Ivy-Rose
- Renzo Charlez
- Danny
- Bjorn
- Pinky
- Dizzy Wright – featured vocals
- Royce da 5'9" – featured vocals
- Crooked I – featured vocals
- Troy Ave – featured vocals
- John "JR" Robinson – drums
- Jerome "Bigfoot" Brailey – drums
- Jonathan Hay – writing, production
- Mike Smith – production
- Sylvia Massy – mixing
- John Frye – mixing
- Richard "Segal" Huredia – mixing
- Ken Lewis – production
- Jerry Hey – horns
- Chris Gehringer – mastering
- Justin "Sky" Boller – co-production on "Gold Blooded"
- Cash Cash – co-writing on "Lipstick"
