= When Music Worlds Collide =

When Music Worlds Collide, Deluxe When Music Worlds Collide

Studio album by Jonathan Hay, Mike Smith, King Tech and various artists
- Released: May 2015, July 2016
- Genre: Hip hop
- Label: SMH Records, Urban Hitchcock
- Producer: Jonathan Hay; Mike Smith; King Tech

Jonathan Hay, Mike Smith, King Tech and various artists chronology
When Music Worlds Collide, Deluxe When Music Worlds Collide (2015)	Deluxe: When Music Worlds Collide (2016)

When Music Worlds Collide is the debut studio album from Jonathan Hay and Mike Smith that features notable names in the hip hop music genre. Hay and Smith, the producers behind the indie hip-hop compilation When Music Worlds Collide decided to put their release to a Tidal (streaming service) vs. Spotify challenge and see which one better served their album. The story of their independent streaming music album was featured on Billboard, Fox News and Business Insider. King Tech co-produced the majority of the songs on the album. Deluxe: When Music Worlds Collide was released on July 26, 2016 through SMH Records.

== Background ==
Jonathan Hay has been described as a "public relations maven" and is best known for his work with Rihanna. Mike Smith owns a record label, SMH Records and is a celebrity judge on the TV show One Shot with Sway Calloway and DJ Khaled. King Tech is known for being a co-host on The Wake Up Show on SiriusXM Shade 45. Together, Hay, Smith and Tech created When Music Worlds Collide. Released in May 2015, one of the focuses of the album release has been the "Tidal vs. Spotify challenge". DJ Envy's website reported that Hay said, "This album for us is about Spotify vs. Tidal, a streaming battle only. We did this release completely grassroots and independent."

"We reached out to both Spotify and Tidal to participate in this challenge. We weren't expecting either to contact us back," Jonathan Hay told Billboard. "So I was surprised when Roc Nation contacted me about the criteria for our challenge. I explained our concept, and asked them to listen to our album. We got great feedback from them about the album, and then they featured it on their homepage under New Releases -- which is staggering. Jay Z has put it out there that Tidal is about helping independent artists. We can say firsthand that's true."

Mike Smith was quoted as saying to Billboard, "Tidal makes an extra effort to promote new and independent artists. They definitely have a leg up on this over Spotify. Jay Z said this would be a priority, and based on our experience, it is." Smith also agreed the sound quality in the pricier version of Tidal was superior to Spotify. "I compared [Tidal] to my computer file of one of our songs and the quality was insane. Streaming through Tidal sonically has really come of age."

Boy Genius Report stated "Tidal went the extra mile to help the duo promote their album and gain exposure. Obviously, that experience had a big impact on Hay and Smith — rightly so — and it influenced their decision in this challenge." When Music Worlds Collide was selected as being part of Tidal Rising. Tidal Rising is a program dedicated to artists from around the globe who have passionate fan bases and are ready to broaden that base to a wider audience. Tidal Rising was designed to help accelerate the exposure and give voice to tomorrow's biggest names.

Hay was quoted in International Business Times as saying “For our album to go from TuneCore to the homepage of Tidal, and to be heard by Roc Nation...that shows their level of commitment to the artist. What sets Tidal apart from others is that it is run by artists and musicians,” he said. All in all, Hay found that “Spotify can’t touch [Tidal] – nobody can. It’s truly brilliant."

According to Tidal execs, streaming of When Music Worlds Collide took off after being featured on the service's home page. They included the project in both the “What’s New” and “Tidal Rising” sections of the site, drawing in curious users looking for something different to listen to. Tidal says they “saw a tremendous upstick in streams” after they began pushing Hay and Smith's album. Ten days after being featured there was an 11,564.8 percent increase in streams of When Music Worlds Collide. “It’s a testament to what a partnership between quality music and Tidal can accomplish,” said a company representative.

UN Ambassador Marsha Moyo from Zambia appears on "Another Mirror" from the album.

== Singles ==
"I Didn't Mean To Treat You Bad" with Kxng Crooked aka Crooked I (from Slaughterhouse) and Shalé is the album's first single and is an interpolation of “Far Behind” by Candlebox. Cyhi the Prynce is the main vocal feature for "I've Been Waiting" and "Flower in the Addict" which were both released as "a throwback concept of Side A / Side B singles on an old school DAT Tape (Digital Audio Tape)". "Ashamed" is the third single from the album and also features Kxng Crooked and DJ Revolution. "Gossip" with Twista is the fourth single from the album. "Letters" featuring Heebz Street from Doggy Style Records, Ana and Matt Berman was the first single released from the deluxe edition.

== Remixes ==
On July 1, Billboard Magazine announced the "Don't Close Your Eyes (Ashamed Remix)" with Kxng Crooked and Truth Ali. The song is a tribute to Keith Whitley and was released on what on what would have been his 60th birthday. Jonathan Hay told Billboard, "One of the main reasons I wanted to do this tribute is because I was raised in Kentucky, just like Keith Whitley," Hay continues. "Being all over the United States, it seems Whitley is more iconic back home in the 'Bluegrass State' then he is everywhere else. We want to change that.”

Hay made a remix to "3 Days in LA" called "Three Days on Second Thought" with Dizzy Wright. Hay told The Source Magazine that he over-produced the original song.

== Music videos ==
A video for Inspectah Deck of Wu-Tang Clan and Shalé's "These Broken Wings" has also been released. Ambrosia For Heads said the following about the video "eerie track about the trials and tribulations of a woman in a broken relationship with herself because of pasts experiences. The video follows a mysterious woman drawn to a man in a mask. Her dependency on this dark figure appears to be self-destructive. Their exotic dance–literally and figuratively–is characterized as a 'social experiment' at the end of the video." A behind the scenes video with guest cameos was released for "Ashamed". "Gossip" with vocal performances from Twista, Horseshoe Gang and Shalé premiered July 15 on HipHopDX.

== Track listing ==
When Music Worlds Collide track listing and credits.

1. "Gossip" featuring Twista, Horseshoe Gang, Shalé and Mike Smith | Produced By Jonathan Hay, Mike Smith and King Tech | Strings by Sylvia Massy
2. "These Broken Wings" featuring Inspectah Deck and Shalé | Produced By Jonathan Hay, Mike Smith and King Tech
3. "Ashamed" featuring Kxng Crooked fka Crooked I, Mike Smith and DJ Revolution | Produced By Jonathan Hay, Mike Smith and King Tech | Additional Production By Tabu
4. "The Blue Notes" featuring Skyzoo, DJ Revolution, Mike Smith and DJ Whoo Kid | Produced By Jonathan Hay, Mike Smith and King Tech
5. "I Didn’t Mean To Treat You Bad" featuring Kxng Crooked fka Crooked I and Shalé | Produced By Jonathan Hay, Mike Smith and King Tech
6. "Flower In The Addict" featuring Cyhi The Prynce, Frankie Porkchops, Caskey, Mike Smith and Shalé | Produced By Jonathan Hay, Mike Smith and King Tech
7. "I Am Broken" featuring N’cho and Jonathan Hay | Produced By Jonathan Hay, Mike Smith and King Tech
8. "Whiskey" featuring Mike Smith, Russ Smith, Wordsworth, Buffalo Stille of Nappy Roots and DJ Revolution | Produced By Jonathan Hay, Mike Smith and King Tech
9. "I've Been Waiting" featuring Cyhi The Prynce and Shalé | Produced By Jonathan Hay, Mike Smith and King Tech
10. "3 Days In LA" featuring Dizzy Wright, Jonathan Hay, Mike Smith, Shalé, Jonny Rice, Jerome Brailey of Parliament-Funkadelic | Produced By Jonathan Hay, Mike Smith and Sylvia Massy
11. "Bodies In The Rent-A-Car (Interlude)" | Produced By King Tech and Jonathan Hay | Additional Production By Sylvia Massy
12. "Rollin'" featuring Kool G Rap, Sadat X, Mike Smith and DJ Revolution | Produced By Jonathan Hay, Mike Smith and King Tech
13. "The Basement" (Light's Out) featuring Royce da 5'9", Mitch Littlez, Mike Smith and Jonathan Hay | Produced By Jonathan Hay, Mike Smith and King Tech | Strings By Sylvia Massy
14. "Another Mirror" featuring Kxng Crooked fka Crooked I, Mike Smith, Marsha Moyo, Jonathan Hay, Shalé, Ren Zo, Jerome Brailey of Parliament Funkadelic, Jonny Rice | Produced By Jonathan Hay and Mike Smith
15. "The FAF Remix" featuring Troy Ave, Royce da 5'9", DJ Whoo Kid, Ren Zo, Mike Smith, Shalé | Produced By Jonathan Hay and Mike Smith
16. "Pushergirl" featuring Madchild, Nino Bless and Mike Smith | Produced By Jonathan Hay, Mike Smith and King Tech
17. "Groupie" featuring Kxng Crooked fka Crooked I and Shalé | Produced By Jonathan Hay, Mike Smith and King Tech

Deluxe Edition Includes:

"Set To Collide" featuring Sylvia Massy and Audio Stepchild | Produced by Jonathan Hay and Mike Smith

"Letters" featuring Heebz Street, Ana and Matt Berman | Produced by Jonathan Hay, Mike Smith and Ajami | Additional Production by Justinn Patton

"Kord (Instrumental)" featuring Pink Grenade and Benny Reid | Produced by Jonathan Hay, Mike Smith and Ajami

"Blue Trilogy" featuring Kool G Rap, Skyzoo, DJ Whoo Kid, DJ Revolution and King Tech | Produced by Jonathan Hay, Mike Smith and DJ King Tech

"Fade 2 Blue" featuring Truth Ali and John JR Robinson | Produced by Jonathan Hay and Mike Smith

"Side Project Propaganda (Interlude)" featuring Audio Stepchild and Cyhi The Prynce | Produced by Jonathan Hay and Mike Smith

"By The Town Border" featuring Sadat X of Brand Nubian, DJ Revolution and King Tech | Produced by Jonathan Hay and Mike Smith

"Nobody Knows (Until They See The Video)" featuring Sylvia Massy, Benny Reid and Jerome "Bigfoot" Brailey of Parliament-Funkadelic | Produced by Jonathan Hay and Mike Smith

"Almost Paradise" featuring Chris Webby | Produced by Jonathan Hay and Mike Smith

All Cuts and Scratches By DJ Revolution | Mastered By Bernie Grundman
