= Iliana Eve =

American singer-songwriter

- Born: June 15, 2002 (age 24); Houston, Texas, U.S.
- Genres: Pop, hip hop, jazz
- Occupations: singer, songwriter
- Instruments: Vocals, piano
- Years active: 2016–present
- Website: ilianaeve.com

Iliana Eve is an American singer-songwriter who was born in Houston, Texas and raised in Louisville, Kentucky. She got her professional start in the music industry with a single that was released through Snoop Dogg's record label Doggy Style Records. TMZ released "Kylie's Daddy", Iliana's collaboration with 22 Savage (aka Funny Mike) and it went viral. She performed a rendition of Elvis Presley's "Can't Help Falling in Love" for the album, Jazz (Deluxe) by Smith and Hay that hit No. 1 on the Billboard Jazz Charts. DJ Whoo Kid and Ranna Royce remixed Iliana's "Can't Help Falling in Love" and some of her other songs and included them on the album The Whoodlum Ball that hit No. 1 on the Billboard Top Heatseekers Chart and No. 156 on the Billboard Top 200.

== Career ==
In 2016, Iliana Eve was 14 years old when she collaborated with Heebz Street for the song "Letters" that premiered on Billboard and was released through Snoop Dogg's record label. She followed that up with "Long Damn Time", a song she wrote with Kanye West's songwriter Cyhi The Prynce. She's featured on Kxng Crooked's "Split Paths" and "Lost Souls" with Nitty Scott and Pulse gay nightclub shooting survivor Patience Carter. "Lost Souls" was released through Billboard on the six-month anniversary of the Orlando nightclub shooting. The remix "49 Lives: Lost Souls" was released on the one-year anniversary of the massacre. The teenager received some notoriety for her song "Kylie's Daddy" about reality star Kylie Jenner. She performed on "Daddy's Little Girl" with Inspectah Deck from Wu Tang Clan.

She recorded "Mommy", a song about child molestation, with Jamaican record producer Kemar McGregor. The single is partly inspired by Korn's song "Daddy" which addresses similar issues. She stated to Entrepreneur Magazine that "recording Mommy was a painful experience of reliving the nightmares and vocalizing them. The lyric that really hit me is 'the long showers I take that won't wash away the memories'. I'm hoping this song can make a difference, maybe even ease some pain that you are not alone." The song is being released on FM Records, an industry leader in pop-reggae music. At 14, Iliana started her own record label to raise awareness about child abuse. She featured on "Too Ashamed" a song by Kxng Crooked that deals with his alcohol and substance abuse. HipHopDX premiered Iliana's single "All Alone" with frequent Lil Yachty collaborator Kevin Pollari. She collaborated with Slaughterhouse on "Almost Paradise", a remix of the hit song from the Footloose Soundtrack released in 1984. The single "Almost Paradise" was No. 28 on the Spotify Charts in Canada. Most of her songs and collaborations appear on the compilation album The Sins of A Father Playlist and the mixtape "Daddy Issues".

In January 2018, Iliana performed on the single "Indiana" featuring Cyhi The Prynce and she's a producer on Riff Raff's "Jazzmine". During the last week of October her collaboration with Yung Bleu "Message in the Bottle" was in XXL Magazine's "Bangers This Week" after premiering on HipHopDX. In November, "Message in the Bottle" and her other single "Love You Goodbye" featuring T-Rell was released for the project Jail Tattoos.

== Personal life ==
Iliana Eve was 15 years old on April 20, 2017, when she was a victim in a violent home invasion with her father Jonathan Hay in Louisville, Kentucky. The crime was allegedly setup by her former neighbor. Three suspects were indicted on kidnapping and robbery charges. Iliana met her biological grandparents for the first time with news reporter Angie Fenton from Oxygen's "Finding My Father" on a TV special. Iliana wrote "Waiting" about her biological grandmother that ended up being the last song United Nations honorary appointee Marsha Moyo ever recorded.
