= Call You =

Call You may refer to:

- "Call You", song by Reel Big Fish from Everything Sucks
- "Call You", song by Kodak Black from Heart Break Kodak
- "Call You", song by Jonathan Hay from The Urban Hitchcock LP

== See also ==
- "Call Ya", song by Chapman Whitney from Chapman Whitney Streetwalkers
- "Call Ya", song by Eleni Foureira from Gypsy Woman
