= This or That =

Studio album by Sway & King Tech and DJ Revolution
- Released: June 15, 1999
- Recorded: 1998–1999
- Studio: Axis Studios (Los Angeles, CA)
- Genre: Hip hop
- Length: 1:01:55
- Label: Interscope
- Producer: DJ Revolution; King Tech; Cut Chemist; DJ Nu-Mark; KutMasta Kurt; Main Source; RZA

Sway & King Tech and DJ Revolution chronology
Concrete Jungle (1991)	This or That (1999)	Back 2 Basics (2005)

Professional ratings
Review scores
Source	Rating
AllMusic	4/5 stars
The Village Voice	A−

This or That is the collaborative album by American hip hop artists Sway & King Tech and DJ Revolution. It was released on June 15, 1999, through Interscope Records. Production was handled mostly by King Tech & DJ Revolution, except for several tracks were produced by Cut Chemist, DJ Nu-Mark, KutMasta Kurt, Main Source and RZA. It features guest appearances from Big Daddy Kane, Canibus, Chill Rob G, Chino XL, Crooked I, Dilated Peoples, Eminem, EPMD, Eric B. & Rakim, Gang Starr, Heltah Skeltah, Inspectah Deck, Jayo Felony, Jurassic 5, Kool Keith, KRS-One, Main Source, Malik B., Pete Rock & CL Smooth, Pharoahe Monch, Planet Asia, Redman, RZA, Tech N9ne and Xzibit among others.

The album was a mild success, peaking at 107 on the Billboard 200 and 30 on the Top R&B/Hip-Hop Albums.

Both a single and promotional music video was released for the song "The Anthem".

== Track listing ==
No.	Title	Producer(s)	Length
1.	"Reality Check" (featuring Gang Starr)		0:48
2.	"Warning"	DJ Revolution	0:34
3.	"The Number One Crew"	DJ Revolution	1:54
4.	"Cyrus"		0:34
5.	"The Anthem" (featuring RZA, Tech N9ne, Eminem, Xzibit, Pharoahe Monch, Kool G Rap, Jayo Felony, Chino XL and KRS-One)	King Tech	4:25
6.	"Rev's Intro"	DJ Revolution	0:49
7.	"Rework the Angles" (featuring Dilated Peoples, A.G. and Defari)	KutMasta Kurt	2:38
8.	"My Name Is" (Outro Mix)	DJ Revolution	0:41
9.	"Canibus Remix" (featuring Canibus)	DJ Revolution	1:10
10.	"NY Niggaz" (featuring Guru)		4:00
11.	"Above the Clouds" (featuring Gang Starr and Inspectah Deck)		1:54
12.	"Underground Tactics" (featuring Heltah Skeltah, Crooked I and Planet Asia)	King Tech	4:25
13.	"Improvise" (featuring Jurassic 5)	Cut Chemist; DJ Nu-Mark	3:03
14.	"I Know You Got Soul" (featuring Eric B. & Rakim)		1:05
15.	"Looking At the Front Door" (featuring Main Source)	Main Source	1:18
16.	"They Reminisce Over You (T.R.O.Y.)" (featuring Pete Rock & C.L. Smooth)		1:35
17.	"Court Is In Session" (featuring Chill Rob G)		1:15
18.	"So What Cha Sayin'" (featuring EPMD)		0:39
19.	"Ugly People Be Quiet" (featuring DJ Cash Money and Marvelous)		2:29
20.	"Ego Trippin' 99" (featuring Kool Keith and Motion Man)	King Tech	2:47
21.	"3 to the Dome" (featuring Big Daddy Kane, Chino XL and Kool G Rap)	King Tech	4:55
22.	"Get You Mad" (featuring Eminem)	King Tech	4:21
23.	"You Wanna Battle"	DJ Revolution	0:50
24.	"1.9.8.6. Remix" (featuring Rasheed, Ill Advised, Malik B. and Black Thought)	DJ Revolution	2:52
25.	"Clientele" (featuring Dirty Unit)	King Tech; DJ Revolution (co.)	5:33
26.	"Belly of the Beast" (featuring Bobby Digital)	RZA	2:41
27.	"KRS-One Intro"		0:35
28.	"Chali 2na Freestyle"		0:57
29.	"Canibus Freestyle"		1:29
30.	"Redman Freestyle"		0:34
31.	"Sonja Blade Freestyle"		0:57
32.	"Wake Up Show Trivia"	King Tech	2:32
Total length:			1:01:55

== Charts ==
Chart (1999)	Peak position
US Billboard 200	107
US Top R&B/Hip-Hop Albums (Billboard)	30
US Heatseekers Albums (Billboard)	1
