= BGE =

BGE may refer to:

- Baltimore Gas and Electric
- Basic Global English, a concept of global English initiated by German linguist Joachim Grzega
- Battleground Europe, a video game
- Beyond Good and Evil (disambiguation)
  - Beyond Good and Evil, a philosophical book by Friedrich Nietzsche
  - Beyond Good & Evil (video game), a 2003 video game
    - Beyond Good and Evil 2, the unreleased sequel
- Blender Game Engine, the built-in Game Engine in Blender
- Bord Gáis Éireann (English: Gas Board of Ireland), now split into
  - Bord Gáis Energy, a utility that supplies gas and electricity and boiler services to customers in the Republic of Ireland
  - Ervia, a multi-utility company distributing pipeline natural gas, water services and dark fibre services in Ireland
- Bread Gang Entertainment, rap label in Memphis including artists like Moneybagg Yo and Finese 2Tymez.
- Broad Green railway station, Liverpool, England (National Rail station code)
- Basic Income Alliance (Bündnis Grundeinkommen), a German single-issue political party
- Bundesgesellschaft für Endlagerung, a German federally owned company
- bge, branch greater equal, an RISC-V instruction
