= Good and evil (disambiguation) =

Good and evil is a common dichotomy in religion, philosophy, ethics, and psychology.

Good and Evil may also refer to:

- Good and Evil (film), a 1921 film directed by Michael Curtiz
- Good and Evil (Chinese TV series), a 2021 drama series
- Good & Evil (TV series), a 1991 American sitcom
- Good and Evil (video) a 2004 skateboarding video produced by Toy Machine
- Good & Evil (album), a 2011 album by Tally Hall
- Good and Evil (painting), a 19th-century painting by Victor Orsel

== See also ==
- Beyond Good and Evil (disambiguation)
- Good vs. Evil (disambiguation)
- Good (disambiguation)
- Evil (disambiguation)
