= Abimbola Fernandez =

Bim Fernandez
- Born: Darnel Abimbọla Olumegbon Fernandez; May 25, 1989 (age 37); Neuilly-sur-Seine, France
- Occupation: Singer
- Years active: 2009–present
- Parent(s): Antonio Deinde Fernandez; Aduke Fernandez
- Relatives: DJ Caise (nephew)
- Musical career
- Also known as: Madame Luxe; Bim
- Origin: New York City
- Genre: Pop
- Instruments: Vocals; guitar
- Label: SMH Records

Darnel Abimbọla "Bim" Olumegbon Fernandez (born May 25, 1989) is a French-born American heiress and singer. She is the daughter of Antonio Deinde Fernandez, a Nigerian billionaire ambassador. In 2014 Fernandez sang with the band Pink Grenade and released two controversial videos that were listed as having millions of online views. She left her label later that year.

== Early life ==
Abimbola Fernandez was born at the American Hospital of Paris in Neuilly-sur-Seine, a commune in the western suburbs of Paris, France. Her father was billionaire Antonio Deinde Fernandez from Lagos State in southwestern Nigeria, who had moved to the United States as a young adult. His Fernandez clan descended from a Portuguese-Brazilian slave trader who raised a family with an African wife in Lagos in the early 19th century.

Fernandez's father had four earlier unions; his third wife was white American Barbara Joyce who married him in 1961 while they were living in Virginia, bore him three children in the United States, separated from him in 1984 or early 1985, then filed for divorce in 1987. His fourth partner was Princess Abiola Dosunmu, who married him in Nigeria in April 1973 in a well-attended ceremony. The union produced a daughter and lasted until 1987–1988. His fifth partner, Fernandez's African-American mother, was born Sandra Inett Price. She took the name Aduke Fernandez at their union, which she said began in 1982 with a tribal wedding in Nigeria, though he later said they were never formally married. The first child born to the couple was daughter Atinuke in 1984, then Abimbola followed in 1989. Her French birth certificate states her name as Darnel Abimbola Olumegbon Fernandez and her mother's name as Aduke Olufunmilola Olumegbon Price Fernandez. The shared name of Olumegbon comes from the Olumegbon noble line of Isale-Eko, Lagos; her father was a descendant of this ruling house through his mother.

After the birth of Fernandez, the family lived a short while in the Hotel Ritz Paris, then moved to the Chateau de Bois-Feuillette in Pontpoint.

Another move took her to New York, her father buying the historic All View Estate at the southern tip of Premium Point, New Rochelle. Fernandez began learning the violin at age four. At age six, she attended Rye Country Day School, and later the Convent of the Sacred Heart in Connecticut. At age 10, she moved with the family to Edinburgh, where she attended Fettes College. At 13, she started playing guitar. Fernandez graduated from Fettes at age 18. She took classes in video production at The Art Institute of New York City, then in 2009, enrolled at Oxford Brookes University at Oxford. When she dropped out after one month to follow a music career, her father disapproved.

Many world figures visited her home on business with her father, including Pope John Paul II, George H. W. Bush, Kofi Annan, Nelson Mandela and Mobutu Sese Seko.

In May 2003 while she was in school in Scotland, her father moved out of their Edinburgh home, and her mother initiated divorce proceedings, suing for £300 million, reported at the time as one of the largest-ever divorce suits. The case was eventually settled for 36 monthly payments of £30,000 totalling £1,080,000.

== Fashion ==
In her teens, Fernandez modeled once for Vivienne Westwood during the Edinburgh Fashion Week. She inherited her mother's collection of couture clothing including multiple caftans, one by Jean-Paul Gaultier, and other items by Givenchy, Chanel, Oscar de la Renta and more.

== Music ==
Fernandez started writing songs on her guitar in her teens. She went to concerts and got to know the members of punk group Forever the Sickest Kids, and Gabe Saporta, the leader and singer of the electro-pop band Cobra Starship. In 2009, Fernandez sang backing vocals on the band's song "Nice Guys Finish Last" along with other women who were in the recording studio, and she modeled for the album cover and inner artwork of Hot Mess, which reached number 4 on the Billboard 200 to become Cobra Starship's most successful album. Fernandez also modeled for the cover of the band's single, "Good Girls Go Bad".

Taking the stage name Madame Luxe, Fernandez began collaborating with various musicians. EDM artist Draper, also an alumnus of Oxford Brookes University, featured Madame Luxe singing on his dubstep song "Painting the Sky", uploaded to SoundCloud in June 2011. The song was included on Draper's self-titled EP, released in February 2012 on the Drop Dead label run by Bring Me the Horizon frontman Oliver Sykes.

Fernandez collaborated with the deejay trio Cash Cash, singing lead and backing vocals on the songs "Tongue Twister" and "We Don't Sleep at Night", both released on the Japan-only version of the Cash Cash album The Beat Goes On in September 2012. Fernandez was also featured on Cash Cash's "Love Crime (Not Innocent)", uploaded to SoundCloud in 2013.

In November 2013, Fernandez signed to SMH Records, founded by Jonathan Hay and Mike Smith, who formed the band Pink Grenade around Fernandez. Credited as Bim Fernandez, she played guitar and sang on the songs "Lets Take It Naked" and "Lipstick", sharing the latter song's co-writing credit with Hay and Cash Cash. The pop song "Let's Take It Naked" was released for streaming online in January 2014. On July 1, 2014, a video for "Let's Take It Naked" was uploaded to Vevo and WorldStarHipHop, amassing 7.5 million views in its first week. The video contrasted the upbeat, poppy music with fictional scenes of Fernandez partying with boys and cocaine, cooking meth, and playing Russian Roulette, fitted with a prosthetic pregnant belly as if she was in the last months of pregnancy. The Herald in Nigeria called the video "scandalous, disturbing and provocative." The video was taken down by Vevo and WorldStarHipHop but can still be viewed on Tidal.

A video for the hip-hop single "Lipstick", was released on July 23, 2014, with scenes of Fernandez performing, alternating with scenes of women playing with red lipstick and paint. The "sexually charged" song has lyrics suggesting fellatio, and at the end a male voice "disses" Kim Kardashian and her family. The songs were included in late July on the Pink Grenade album, Fear of a Pink Planet, distributed through Caroline Records.

Fernandez left SMH Records in November 2014.

== Personal life ==
Fernandez's mother died of colon cancer in May 2013. The loss caused Fernandez to re-evaluate her career, and to push forward in music, as her mother had wished, unlike her father who had cut off her allowance for a few years because he disapproved of her music path.

After her father died in September 2015, Fernandez posted tribute messages and family photos on her Instagram account, showing her father together with her.

With her father dead, Fernandez and her step-mother Halima, her father's sixth long-term partner, became embroiled in a bitter dispute about inheritance. Halima did not consider Fernandez to be a legitimate heir of her father, while Fernandez said Halima was never married to her father. Fernandez wrote that Halima was not considerate of the father's wish to be buried in Nigeria with a state funeral, burying him instead in Belgium where he died, and arranging a smaller funeral service, conducted with insulting insinuations aimed at Fernandez's deceased mother. The dispute spilled over into online jabs.
