= Don't Close Your Eyes =

Don't Close Your Eyes may refer to:

== Albums ==
- Don't Close Your Eyes (album), by Keith Whitley
- Don't Close Your Eyes (EP), by Parkway Drive

== Songs ==
- "Don't Close Your Eyes" (Keith Whitley song)
- "Don't Close Your Eyes" (Kix song)
- "Don't Close Your Eyes" (Max Jason Mai song)
- "Don't Close Your Eyes Ashamed", by Kxng Crooked, Truth Ali, and Jonathan Hay
