= Boss Music =

Boss Music may refer to:

- Boss Music (album), an album by rapper Crooked I
- The music that plays during boss (video gaming) battles
- Bossmusic, an independent record label
