= Sex, Money and Hip-Hop =

Studio album by KXNG CROOKED
- Released: December 16, 2014
- Recorded: 2014
- Genre: Hip-hop
- Length: 68:11
- Label: Treacherous C.O.B.; SMH
- Producer: Sarah J; Jonathan Hay; Mike Smith; J.U.S.T.I.C.E. League; KXNG CROOKED; Tabu; Aktive; Rick Rock; Big Blizz; Ryan Ru; Pryme; Keyz; Audio Jones; Lavish; Rogue Regime; Chysty; Brainstorm; Montage; Chris Noxx

KXNG CROOKED chronology
Apex Predator (2013)	Sex, Money and Hip-Hop (2014)	Statik KXNG (2016)

Sex, Money and Hip-Hop is the second studio album by rapper and Slaughterhouse member KXNG CROOKED (also known as Crooked I). The album was released on December 16, 2014 and it was executive produced by KXNG CROOKED himself along with Mike Smith and Jonathan Hay.

== Background ==
On November 15, 2014 during the Shady Cypher for Shady XV, Crooked I officially announced that he was changing his name to Kxng Crooked for his upcoming release Sex, Money and Hip-Hop an album that he described as a "mixtape experience". On November 20 the first single "Freestylin' Under Oath" was released. Billboard reported on December 2 that Slaughterhouse would appear on the album with the song "Total Slaughter". On December 5, MTV News exclusively released the song "I Can't Breathe" to raise awareness for Eric Garner. On December 15, "An Open Letter To The Internet" was released asking the fans to not leak the album online.

We are asking the fans who purchased this album NOT to upload it anywhere online, but to keep it tucked away in your own little stash for your own mixtape experience. This is a piece of history. A collector’s item. A rare piece of art. There are limited copies of this album being manufactured, and you may just be one of the lucky few who own a copy forever. We believe the fans will want to keep this art from going public via the internet and we are trusting you with this. You see, if this album is uploaded online the value of it decreases drastically, much like a baseball card or a rare comic book. It’s simple: keep it retro. Keep this album offline and keep it valuable.

— Kxng Crooked, The Source

On January 13, 2015 the video for "I Can't Breathe" was released to promote Sex, Money and Hip-Hop. The album was released on iTunes on February 26, 2016 through Smith and Hay / Urban Hitchcock.

== Track listing ==
=== Original album ===
No.	Title	Producer(s)	Length
1.	"Intro"	KXNG CROOKED; Bear McCreary	0:53
2.	"Fallen Rap Gods"	Big Blizz; Sarah J	3:35
3.	"Life After Death Row" (Interlude)	KXNG CROOKED	1:35
4.	"Sick of Being Broke" (featuring Emanny)	Pryme; Keyz; Sarah J	3:30
5.	"No Plan B"	Audio Jones; Sarah J	2:30
6.	"Prometheus"	Ryan Ru; Sarah J	3:55
7.	"God Bless the KXNG"	Lavish; Sarah J	4:40
8.	"Freestylin' Under Oath"	Tabu	4:40
9.	"Sauce Got Rules" (Interlude)	KXNG CROOKED	0:35
10.	"Hardest In the Game"	Big Blizz; Sarah J	3:25
11.	"Drum Murder Pt. 2" (featuring Horseshoe Gang)	Aktive	3:30
12.	"Barbara Bush" (featuring Sir Doobie and Barbara Bush)	Rogue Regime; Sarah J	3:35
13.	"Groupie" (featuring Shale)	Jonathan Hay; Mike Smith	4:25
14.	"Martian Pussy" (featuring Sir Doobie and Siri)	Rick Rock	3:35
15.	"The Originals" (featuring Bo-Roc)	J.U.S.T.I.C.E. League	4:30
16.	"Know Thy Self"	Big Blizz; Chysty; Sarah J	3:40
17.	"Lift Me Up" (featuring Novel)	J.U.S.T.I.C.E. League	3:55
18.	"Move Like a G Do"	Brainstorm; Sarah J	2:55
19.	"If I Die"	Montage; Sarah J	3:45
20.	"Total Slaughter" (performed by Slaughterhouse)	Jonathan Hay; Mike Smith; Aktive	3:35
21.	"Make Way for the KXNG"	Chris Noxx; Sarah J	4:10
Total length:			1:12:25

=== Remastered album ===
No.	Title	Length
1.	"Fallen Rap Gods"	3:36
2.	"Sick of Being Broke" (featuring Emanny)	3:32
3.	"No Plan B"	2:30
4.	"Prometheus"	3:59
5.	"Ashamed (Extended Version)" (featuring DJ Revolution, Tabu, and DJ King Tech)	4:20
6.	"Freestylin' Under Oath" (featuring Tabu)	4:42
7.	"I Can't Breathe"	4:05
8.	"God Bless the Kxng"	4:39
9.	"Hardest In the Game"	3:25
10.	"Drum Murder 2" (featuring Horseshoe Gang)	3:29
11.	"The Originals"	4:29
12.	"Barbara" (featuring Sir Doobie)	3:39
13.	"Martian Pussy" (featuring Sir Doobie and Siri)	3:35
14.	"Know Thy Self"	3:43
15.	"Lift Me Up" (featuring Novel)	3:55
16.	"Move Like a G Do"	2:58
17.	"If I Die" (featuring Mike Smith)	3:46
18.	"Total Slaughter (Remix)" (featuring Slaughterhouse)	3:39
19.	"Make Way for the KXNG"	4:09
Total length:		1:12:10
