= Sway Calloway =

American rapper and journalist (born 1971)

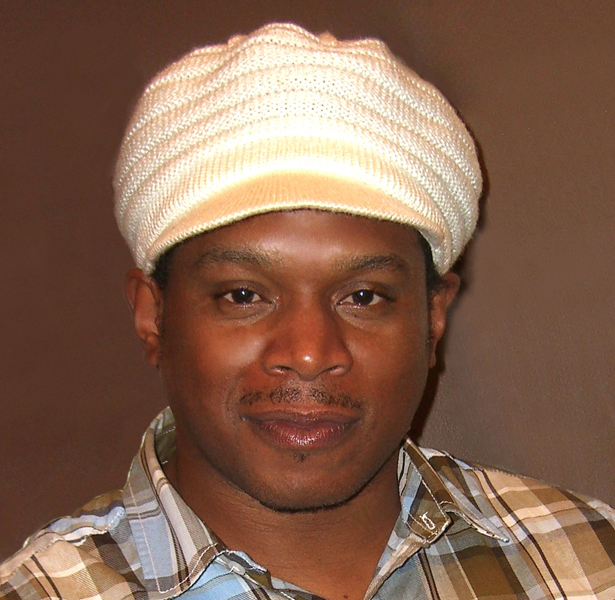
- Calloway in 2011
- Born: Jonathan Ahmad Calloway; July 3, 1971 (age 55); Oakland, California, U.S.
- Occupations: Journalist; radio personality; producer; rapper
- Years active: 1986–present
- Children: 1
- Awards: Radio Hall of Fame

Jonathan Ahmad Calloway (born July 3, 1971), known professionally as Sway Calloway (or simply Sway), is an American radio personality, journalist and former rapper known for hosting programs focused on music, news, and urban culture. He was an on-air reporter and host for MTV News and occasional non-news hosting, including several red carpet MTV award pre-shows, and reports on major events, concluding his tenure with the network as host of the short-lived TRLAM. He is co-hosting the nationally syndicated radio show The Wake Up Show as one half of the duo Sway & King Tech; and hosting Sway in the Morning on SiriusXM Shade45.

== Early career ==
As a teenager growing up in Oakland, California, Sway became a locally known rapper and b-boy performing on San Francisco's Pier 39. He teamed up with DJ King Tech after high school and the duo performed at various San Francisco Bay Area clubs. They also released independent albums. A major label record deal with Giant Records followed. The resulting album, Concrete Jungle in 1990, got them the job of co-hosting their own show on radio station KMEL.

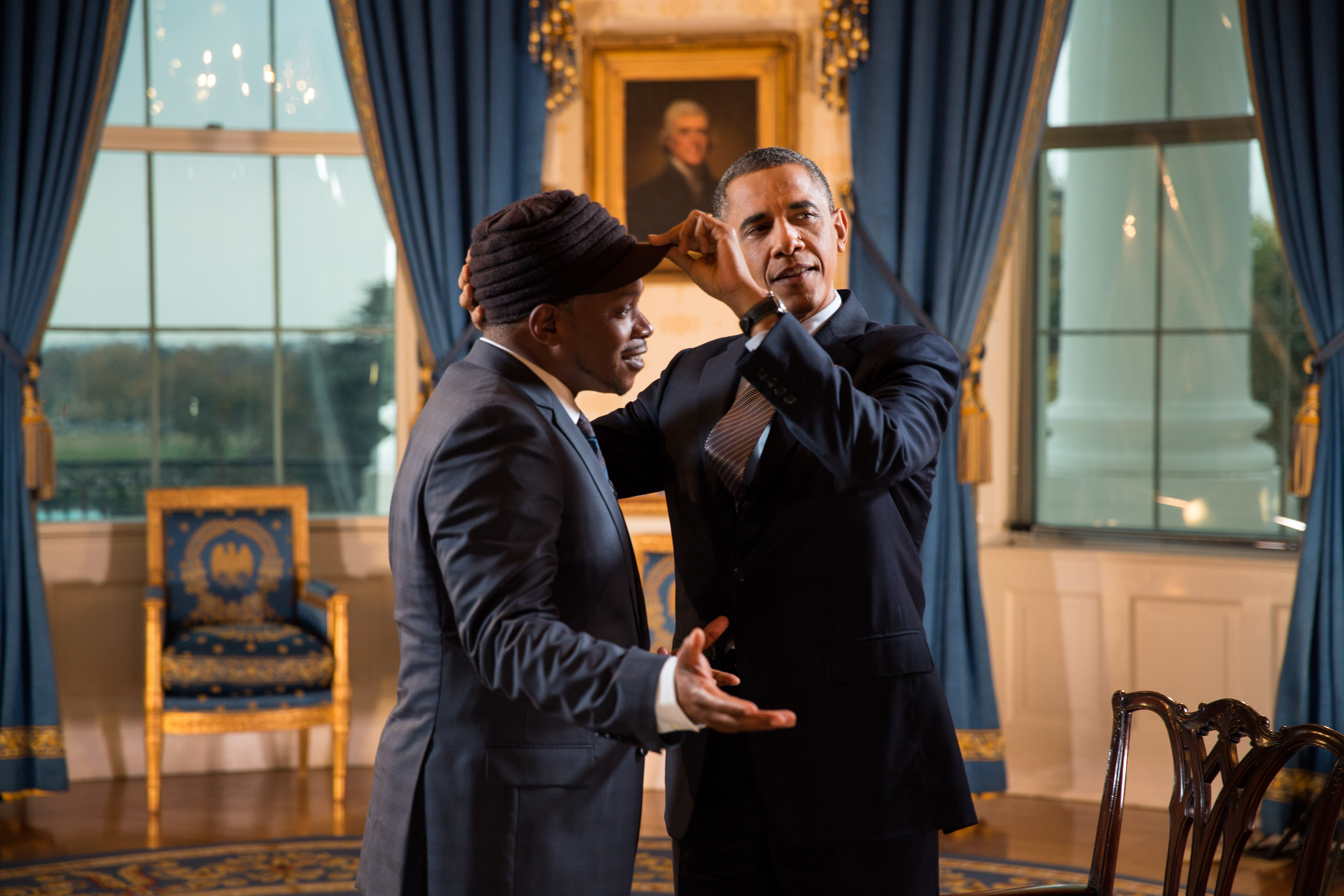
President Barack Obama adjusts Calloway's hat after a 2012 interview for a Live MTV special at the White House.

Another album, Back 2 Basics was released in 2005 on Sway and Tech's own record label, Bolo Entertainment, which is distributed by Universal Music.

== Radio ==
The Wake Up Show featured music and interviews with well-known hip hop artists as well as up-and-coming ones. The show became very popular and began simulcasting to Los Angeles on KKBT in 1993 and to Chicago on WEJM by 1996. Ras Kass, Chino XL and Eminem are among the rappers who made their broadcasting debuts on the show. Soon, Sway was also hosting his own morning drive time show on the station.

The popularity of the show helped Sway and Tech get another record deal, this time with Interscope Records. Their album, This or That, reached #30 on Billboard's R&B/Hip-Hop Albums chart and #1 on the Top Heatseekers chart in 1999. The album featured contributions from hip hop artists such as RZA, Eminem, Xzibit, Kool G Rap, KRS-One, Big Daddy Kane, Tech N9ne, Pharoahe Monch and The Roots. Sway also made an appearance on Jennifer Lopez's DVD, The Reel Me in late 2003.

Sway hosts a weekday morning show on Eminem’s Shade 45 channel on SiriusXM! “Sway in the Morning” launched on Monday, July 18, 2011 on Shade 45 (SiriusXM channel 45) and airs Monday-Friday from 8am-12 noon ET. The second week he was there Ludacris phoned in on the show and they talked about his music and movie career. In an interview with The Source in 2012, Sway talked about his experiences in both satellite and terrestrial radio.

In November 2013, Kanye West appeared as a guest on his show and had an infamous meltdown on air, uttering memorable lines like "You ain't got the answers Sway, You ain't been doing the education".

== Television ==
In 2000, Sway was approached by MTV to join the network as a correspondent, becoming a regular reporter for its music video shows and news specials, including Total Request Live and the hip-hop music video show Direct Effect. Because MTV's studios are based in New York City, King Tech and The Wake Up Show, which had originated in the San Francisco Bay Area on KMEL before moving to Los Angeles went along with Sway in his move. Sway's prominence on MTV led to a brief TV version of the show on the network in January 2004. During this period, Sway also served as a key correspondent for MTV's "Choose or Lose" and "Power of '12" political campaigns, interviewing high-profile figures including Hillary Clinton, John McCain, and Barack Obama.

Throughout his tenure at MTV, Sway collaborated frequently with Sean Combs. He served as the primary correspondent for the finale of Making the Band 2 in 2004 and spearheaded the "Diddy for a Day" MTV contest. He has also maintained a long-standing professional relationship with Jay-Z, notably anchoring the 2001 MTV Unplugged special and later conducting the highly publicized 4:44 retrospective interview for Tidal and Shade 45.

In 2005, Sway voiced himself in the animated series The Boondocks episode "The Story of Gangstalicious". In 2006, he signed a new contract with MTV that allowed him to produce programming with King Tech across Viacom channels. He later appeared on the MTV sketch comedy show Short Circuitz in 2007 and anchored the network's coverage of Michael Jackson's death in 2009.

His television presence expanded into scripted dramas in the 2010s, with guest appearances as himself on the Fox series Empire and the Marvel Cinematic Universe series Luke Cage.

In 2016, Sway hosted and executive produced the BET competition series One Shot alongside co-executive producer and series star Mike Smith. The program featured a panel of judges including T.I., The Game, DJ Khaled, and RZA, with Crooked I and King Tech also serving as leads. The competition offered a $100,000 prize and a contract with Smith's label, SMH Records. In 2024, Smith was indicted for orchestrating a multi-million dollar streaming fraud scheme; he subsequently pleaded guilty to wire fraud conspiracy involving the use of bots to artificially inflate music streams.

== Discography ==
Year	Title	Artist	Type
As a rapper
1988	Flynamic Force	King Tech & MC Sway	Extended play (EP)
1991	Concrete Jungle	Sway & King Tech	Long play (LP)
Various artists
1999	This or That	Sway & King Tech	Long play (LP)
2005	Back 2 Basics	Sway & King Tech	Long play (LP)

== Filmography ==
Year	Title	Role	Notes
2005, 2007	The Boondocks	Himself	2 episodes
2013	Battle of the Year	Himself	
2014	Top Five	Himself	
2015-2018	Empire	Himself	3 episodes
2016, 2018	Luke Cage	Himself	Episodes: "Soliloquy of Chaos", "Can't Front On Me"
2018	Death Wish	Himself	
