= Life After Death Row =

- Directed by: Dominick Wickliffe & James Cail
- Produced by: Dominick Wickliffe, James Cail & Jay Kleiner
- Starring: Crooked I The Horseshoe G.A.N.G. Suge Knight; Russell Simmons; Jim Gittum; Master P Loon; Bun B WC; RBX; Big C Style; Mopreme Shakur; Phobia; Eastwood; Spider Loc; Paperboy
- Narrated by: Crooked I
- Edited by: Mack Tompkins & Eric Herbert
- Distributed by: Phoenix Entertainment Group
- Release date: August 29, 2006
- Running time: 80 minutes
- Country: United States
- Language: English

Life After Death Row is a documentary on the musical career of the rapper Crooked I. The tell-all film was released on August 29, 2006, and illustrates the trials and tribulations Crooked I endured while under contract under the infamous Death Row Records.

The film also takes the viewer on a journey with Crooked I building his own record label Dynasty Entertainment. The film contains many guest appearances from other musical figures who share similar views of Crooked I. These individuals include Russell Simmons, Master P, Jim Gittum, Loon, Bun B, WC, RBX, Big C Style, Mopreme Shakur, Phobia, Eastwood, Spider Loc, Paperboy.
