= Antonio Deinde Fernandez =

Nigerian billionaire

Oloye Antonio Oladeinde Fernandez of Dudley
- Nelson Mandela visiting the Fernandez family in New York, 1994. From left: Mandela, Abimbola, Atinuke, Aduke and Fernandez.
- Born: 12 August 1929; Lagos, Nigeria
- Died: 1 September 2015 (aged 86); Belgium
- Occupations: bureaucrat; business magnate; diplomat
- Years active: 1966–2015
- Relatives: Abimbola Fernandez (daughter); DJ Caise (grandson)

Oloye Antonio Oladeinde Fernandez of Dudley (12 August 1929 – 1 September 2015) was a Nigerian billionaire business magnate, diplomat and Pan-African leader who was Permanent Representative of the Central African Republic to the United Nations. He was considered one of the richest men in Africa.

In addition to a variety of other chieftaincy titles, he held the title of the Apesin Ola of the Egba clan of Yorubaland. Meanwhile, in Scotland, Chief Fernandez was also entitled to use the courtesy territorial designation "of Dudley" as part of his formal name due to his being a baron.

== Background ==
Fernandez was born on 12 August 1929, in Lagos, Nigeria, to a family with Portuguese-Brazilian and Yoruba ancestry. His father was named Camut Akinwale or Kanut Akinwande Fernandez, born with the first name Yesufu, which he later changed. The Fernandez family descended from a Portuguese-Brazilian slave trader who settled in Lagos in the early 19th century to raise a family with his African wife.

Fernandez's mother was Juliana Durojaiye Fernandez, née Palomeras; she was also a member of the Olumegbon noble line of Isale-Eko, Lagos. In 1989, Fernandez named his youngest child Darnel Abimbola Olumegbon Fernandez, naming her in honour of the Olumegbon heritage.

As a child, Fernandez attended Catholic primary school next to the Cathedral of the Holy Cross, Lagos, then CMS Grammar School in the Bariga neighborhood. He enrolled at St Gregory's College, Lagos, for his secondary education but left after his second year for the United States. While in the U.S., he brokered a deal for shipping bauxite from the mining area of Jos, Nigeria, to a client in the U.S.; the deal made him his first million dollars.

== Diplomatic career ==
He started his diplomatic career in 1966 as Consul of the Republic of Dahomey (now Benin Republic). In 1982, he served as advisor to the Angolan Government on Economic matters. He held this position for two years until his appointment as Deputy Permanent Representative of Mozambique to the United Nations in 1984.

== Business interests ==
Fernandez ran an oil company called Petro Inett which obtained a 50% share with South African-based Energy Africa Limited in a deal with the state oil company for exploration rights in a 4,700 km^{2} area of Angola's coast in 1996. In 1992, he was appointed as Special Adviser to the President of Mozambique on International Economic Matters, a position he held for three years.

== Personal life ==
Fernandez had six wives or long-term partners, and he acknowledged nine children.

Princess Ibilola Lipede of Egbaland was his first wife. Their daughter Olateju Phillips learned accountancy and served as the Commissioner for Commerce and Industry in Lagos State. Olateju married British engineer Lanre Phillips and had four children; their son Derin Phillips built a music career as DJ Caise, and in 2018 married Xerona Duke, the daughter of Governor Donald Duke.

Folashade Bankole was Fernandez's second wife, the marriage producing Gbemi Fernandez and Anthony Fernandez.

His third wife was a first generation West Indian black American Barbara Joyce who married Fernandez in 1961 in Virginia, bore him three children in the U.S., separated from him in 1984 or early 1985, then filed for divorce in 1987. The offspring of this marriage are Akintokunbo Fernandez, Christina Titilola Unzicker and Adekoyejo Fernandez. During the divorce, Fernandez claimed diplomatic immunity to prevent Barbara from keeping their mansion in Greenwich, Connecticut. The dispute, which was heard in Connecticut Supreme Court and established a legal precedent, was decided against Fernandez, determining that diplomatic immunity laws signed in 1972 at the Vienna Convention were meant for official business, not divorces. After Barbara died in mid-2013, Fernandez was distraught and refused to celebrate his own birthday.

Fernandez was married to Princess Abiola Dosunmu, who later became the fourth Erelu Kuti of Lagos. When she met Fernandez in 1972, she was a widow with two children. Dosunmu and Fernandez were married in Nigeria at the Palace of the Oba in April 1973 in a ceremony attended by famous Nigerians including Admiral Adekunle Lawal. They had one child, a daughter named Antoinette Oyinkansola Fernandez - a London-based writer and filmmaker who stood for a seat in Parliament in July 2024 as a Green Party candidate. Nigerian musician King Sunny Adé wrote a song honoring Dosunmu titled "Biibire Kose Fowora". Fernandez and Dosunmu worked together to bring industry to Nigeria. When Fernandez was visiting in Lagos, he stayed with Dosunmu at the Tower Fernandez, which they built together. The marriage lasted fifteen years. In 2007, Dosunmu was publicly ordered by Fernandez to stop using his surname.

His fifth partner was African-American Sandra Inett Price. She took the name Aduke Fernandez at their union, which she said began in 1982 with a tribal wedding in Nigeria, though at their divorce proceedings in 2003 he said they were never formally married. Two daughters were born of this union: Atinuke Fernandez in 1984, and Abimbola Fernandez in 1989. On Abimbola's French birth certificate, Fernandez wrote that his own birth year was 1936, not 1929. The family lived in a chateau in Pontpoint, France, then moved to New York and bought the historic All View Estate, and later lived in Edinburgh. In May 2003, Fernandez left Aduke and their Edinburgh mansion to live at the Ritz Hotel in Paris. Aduke initiated divorce proceedings in July 2003, and sued for £300 million, one of the largest divorce suits in history. Lord Brodie presided over the case, which was eventually settled for 36 monthly payments of £30,000 totalling £1,080,000. Aduke died in 2013, after having reconciled with Fernandez, speaking to him on the telephone. Living in New York City, daughter Abimbola followed a music career against the wishes of her father, and was in the band Pink Grenade in 2014, appearing in two controversial videos.

The sixth partner of Fernandez was Halima Maude, once a beauty queen of Kano. She was previously married, and had two children before meeting Fernandez. They married in 2003 when he was 74, and lived in Brussels. She remarried in July 2018, three years after the death of Fernandez.

In addition to the various titles that he held in the Nigerian chieftaincy system, Chief Fernandez was also the Baron of Dudley in Scotland. He purchased this title for £59,000, and held it until his death.

== Death ==
Fernandez died on 1 September 2015, in Belgium, after an undisclosed illness of several months. He was buried at Ixelles Cemetery in Brussels on 18 September 2015. His daughter Abimbola and his last partner Halima became embroiled in a bitter dispute about inheritance. Halima did not consider Abimbola to be a legitimate heir, while Abimbola said Halima was never married to Fernandez. Abimbola also said Halima was not considerate of Fernandez's wish to be buried in Nigeria with a state funeral, as Halima had arranged instead for a smaller service in Belgium, the funeral conducted with insulting insinuations aimed at Aduke, Abimbola's deceased mother. The dispute spilled over into online forums.
