= Don't Close Your Eyes (Ashamed) =

Single by Kxng Crooked, Truth Ali, Jonathan Hay and Morgan McRae

from the album The Urban Hitchcock LP
- Released: September 2015
- Recorded: 2015
- Genre: Hip-hop
- Length: 5:41 (audio); 6:13 (music video)
- Label: Urban Hitchcock
- Songwriters: Dominick Wickliffe; Jonathan Hay; Bob McDill; Joshua Rowe; Morgan McRae; Ajami
- Producers: Jonathan Hay; Ajami

"Don't Close Your Eyes (Ashamed)" is a song written by Dominick Wickliffe, Jonathan Hay, Bob McDill, Joshua Rowe, Morgan McRae and Ajami about alcohol abuse, adoption and suicide. The song is performed by Kxng Crooked formerly known as Crooked I of Slaughterhouse, Truth Ali, Jonathan Hay and Morgan McRae. The chorus of the song was originally performed by American country music artist Keith Whitley. The demo version of the song premiered on Billboard on July 1, 2015, on what would have been Whitley's 61st birthday. The music video of the song premiered on MTV News on August 27, 2015.

== Background ==
Billboard announced the release of "Don't Close Your Eyes (Ashamed)" a tribute to the late Keith Whitley on his 60th birthday. The song is performed by Shady Records recording artist Kxng Crooked formerly known as Crooked I (from Slaughterhouse), Truth Ali, Jonathan Hay and Morgan McRae. "I feel the rap verses really capture the emotional torment of the original", producer Jonathan Hay explained to Billboard.

"As you may or may not know, Keith Whitley died from alcoholism – Kxng Crooked talks about his own chilling battle with alcoholism in his verse", he adds of the evocative tribute. "One of the main reasons I wanted to do this tribute is because I was raised in Kentucky, just like Keith Whitley", Hay continues. "Being all over the United States, it seems Whitley is more iconic back home in the 'Bluegrass State' then he is everywhere else. We want to change that".

— Jonathan Hay, Billboard

Kxng Crooked has battled alcohol abuse on and off for years and told MTV News, "I've been in several dark places in my life. Betrayed by those closest to me or feelings of hopelessness in situations I can't control or even others trying to remove me from this earth… It takes its toll. I have to rise above and keep moving forward for myself and my loved ones. I like to meditate and read a lot so that helps. Music is my ultimate medicine, though".

"I'm involved in a few very serious business ventures so I had to put that demon down and focus on what matters. M.O.B. That's money over bottles".

— Kxng Crooked, MTV News

== Music video ==
The music video was filmed in Louisville, Kentucky and is the first part of a five-part series for producer Jonathan Hay, who had the idea to recreate late county singer Keith Whitley's 1988 single as part of a video series. Whitley died of alcohol poisoning in 1989. The heavy subject matter of the track links not only the pitfalls of alcoholism but also child abuse, suicide and depression. The video pays homage to famed filmmaker Alfred Hitchcock and each of the visuals in the series will appear in black and white.

"Don't Close Your Eyes (Ashamed)" is from Hay's upcoming The Urban Hitchcock LP with features from Cyhi the Prynce, Canibus, Royce da 5'9", Skyzoo, Planet Asia, Professor Griff of Public Enemy, Chino XL and more.
