= Statik Kxng =

Studio album by Statik Selektah and Kxng Crooked
- Released: February 12, 2016
- Recorded: 2015
- Genre: Hip-hop
- Labels: ShowOff; Penalty
- Producer: Statik Selektah

Statik Selektah chronology
Lucky 7 (2015)	Statik Kxng (2016)	8 (2017)

Kxng Crooked chronology
Sex, Money and Hip-Hop (2014)	Statik Kxng (2016)	Good Vs Evil (2016)

Singles from Statik Kxng
- 1. "Dead or in Jail" Released: November 27, 2015; 2. "Everybody Know" Released: January 8, 2016; 3. "Let's Go" Released: January 29, 2016

Professional ratings
Review scores
Source	Rating
Exclaim!	8/10
HipHopDX	3/5
RapReviews	7.5/10

Statik Kxng is the only collaborative full-length studio album by American hip-hop record producer Statik Selektah and West Coast rapper Crooked I. It was released on February 12, 2016, through Showoff Records and Penalty Entertainment. Entirely produced by Statik Selektah, it features a lone guest appearance from Termanology. Music videos were directed for the songs "I Hear Voices" and "Let's Go". In the United States, the album peaked at number 35 on the Top R&B/Hip-Hop Albums, number 21 on the Top Rap Albums and number 23 on the Independent Albums charts.

== Track listing ==
No.	Title	Length
1.	"I Hear Voices"	3:24
2.	"Magic & Bird"	2:11
3.	"Lost a Fan"	3:18
4.	"Everybody Know"	3:18
5.	"Dead or in Jail"	4:43
6.	"Stop Playing"	4:07
7.	"Good Gone Bad"	3:08
8.	"Let's Go" (featuring Termanology)	3:53
9.	"Bitch Got Me Fucked Up"	2:50
10.	"Brand New Shit"	2:52

== Charts ==
Chart (2016)	Peak position
US Top R&B/Hip-Hop Albums (Billboard)	35
US Top Rap Albums (Billboard)	21
US Independent Albums (Billboard)	23
