= Apex Predator (Crooked I album) =

Studio album by Crooked I
- Released: July 30, 2013
- Recorded: 2012–2013
- Genre: Hip-hop
- Length: 41:04
- Label: Treacherous C.O.B.; Empire Distribution
- Producer: Tico Khrimian (exec.); Crooked I (also exec.); Cardo; Jonathan Elkaer; Luxe Beats; Mr. Porter; Sarom; Snaz; Streetrunner; Tabu

Crooked I chronology
In None We Trust EP (2011)	Apex Predator (2013)	Sex, Money and Hip-Hop (2014)

Singles from Apex Predator
- 1. "No Sleep Gang" Released: July 16, 2013

Apex Predator is the debut studio album by American rapper and Slaughterhouse member Crooked I. The album was released on July 30, 2013, by Treacherous C.O.B. and Empire Distribution. The album features guest appearances from K-Young, Tech N9ne and Tena Jones.

== Release and promotion ==
On July 16, 2013, "No Sleep Gang" was released as the album's first single, along with the pre-order of the album. On July 25, 2013, the music video was released for "Yodo". On July 30, 2013, the music video was released for "Crook ‘n Porter". On August 9, 2013, the music video was released for "No Sleep Gang". On August 21, 2013, the music video was released for "Nobody Cares" featuring Tena Jones. On February 10, 2014, the music video was released for "Sumthin From Nuthin".

== Critical response ==
Professional ratings
Review scores
Source	Rating
HipHopDX	3.5/5 stars
RapReviews	6.5/10
XXL	(L)

Apex Predator was met with mixed reviews from music critics. Bruce Smith of HipHopDX gave the album three and a half stars out of five, saying "At times, Slaughterhouse as a whole has been accused by some of not being able to write a good song. If there was any doubt Crooked I can’t as an individual, Apex Predator, should erase any such doubts. Unfortunately, Crook doesn’t display that ability consistently throughout project. Potential is a word seldom used for someone as experienced as Crooked I, however, with this being his proper debut album, you can definitely see the potential of what Crooked could accomplish for his next go round. While a decent project, Apex Predator falls short of what Crooked I is now clearly capable of releasing." Emmanuel C.M. of XXL gave the album an L, saying "All in all, Apex Predator doesn’t keep listeners interested as one might hope for a debut full-length. Crooked I can rap—no question about it—but the LP lacks innovative production and enough creativity to make this more than just another rap album. The disappointing thing about it is you want to root for Crooked I, but after it ends, you’re left wishing there was something to takeaway from it." Grant Jones of RapReviews gave the album a 6.5 out of 10, saying "Ultimately, it is an intense listen and thankfully only eleven tracks in length, any more and it would become too much. Given the lyrical nature of an artist like Crooked, I'd have liked to hear a bit more variety, as what we are offered here is a Slaughterhouse record with one member rather than a true Crooked I album. Sonically, this album is well produced but does have some dodgy moments; "Tell Them Motherfuckers We Made It" cuts right through the most tolerable ear drums, while "No Sleep Gang" is a weak attempt at a Dirty South style anthem that gets drowned out in bass. Overall though, if you enjoy arrogant lyricism with in-your-face production (essentially what Slaughterhouse is all about) then you'll be satisfied with "Apex Predator" – it's just disappointing it couldn't have been a bit more polished and lyrically introspective.

== Track listing ==
No.	Title	Producer(s)	Length
1.	"Yodo"	Snaz	2:33
2.	"Vegas On Biz" (featuring K-Young)	Jonathan Elkaer	4:41
3.	"Let Me Get It" (featuring Tech N9ne)	Luxe Beats	3:04
4.	"Apex Predator (My Gun Go)"	Streetrunner; Sarom	3:43
5.	"Nobody Cares" (featuring Tena Jones)	Tabu	3:55
6.	"Crowns"	Tabu	4:11
7.	"A Lady Fell In Love"	Jonathan Elkaer	4:34
8.	"No Sleep Gang"	Cardo	4:04
9.	"Sumthin From Nuthin"	Crooked I	2:48
10.	"Crook N Porter"	Mr. Porter	3:15
11.	"Tell Them MF's We Made It"	Tabu	3:55
Total length:			41:04

== Charts ==
Chart (2013)	Peak position
US Independent Albums (Billboard)	46
US Heatseekers Albums (Billboard)	6
US Top R&B/Hip-Hop Albums (Billboard)	33
