= Back 2 Basics (Sway & King Tech album) =

Studio album by Sway & King Tech
- Released: May 24, 2005
- Genre: Hardcore hip hop; hip hop
- Label: Bungalo
- Producer: DJ Revolution; King Tech; DJ Premier; DJ Khalil

Sway & King Tech chronology
This or That (1999)	Back 2 Basics (2005)

Professional ratings
Review scores
Source	Rating
Allmusic	3/5 stars

Back 2 Basics is the third album by hip hop duo Sway & King Tech. The album was released in 2005 by Bungalo Records and was produced by DJ Revolution. The album was not as successful as their previous album This or That. It did not make it on any charts. However, the album spawned the semi-successful single "I Don't Think So". Guests on the album include RZA, Chino XL, Crooked I, MC Juice & Royce da 5'9".

== Track listing ==
1. "Intro" (featuring RZA) - 2:34
2. "Everything" (featuring Sly Boogy) - 4:09
3. "Watch Closer" (featuring Chino XL & Tracy Lane) - 3:57
4. "I Wish U Would" (feat. Royce da 5'9", Canibus & Chino XL) - 4:23
5. "Ill Hip Hop" (featuring MC Juice) - 4:27
6. "Thoughts on How to Make a Good Album" - 0:59
7. "I Don't Think So" (featuring Kam) - 4:30
8. "Enough Beef" (featuring Royce da 5'9", Common & Chino XL) - 4:13
9. "Port-O-Posse" (featuring KutMasta Kurt) - 2:53
10. "We Don't Give A..." ( featuring Kallihan & Hellraiza) - 3:40
11. "Watch What You Do" (featuring Crooked I) - 4:35
12. "Wake Up Show Anniversary" (featuring Chino XL) - 3:24
13. "Trouble" (featuring Chino XL & Tracy Lane) - 4:09
14. "23 Degrees" (featuring Dirty Birdy) - 4:54
15. "Wack Detector" (featuring KutMasta Kurt) - 1:45
16. "Better Days" (featuring Self Scientific & Tracy Lane) - 4:20
17. "High Fidelity" (featuring DJ Revolution) - 3:56
18. "Hands to the Sky" (featuring Verb & Rock) - 3:54
19. "I Love the Ghetto" (featuring Crooked I & Tracy Lane) - 4:18
20. "Hit the Deck" (featuring Crooked I) - 3:38
