= Good vs. Evil (album) =

Studio album by KXNG Crooked
- Released: November 11, 2016
- Recorded: 2016
- Genre: Hip-hop
- Length: 52:55 (standard edition); 71:53 (deluxe edition)
- Label: RBC; E1
- Producer: KXNG Crooked (exec.); Matthew Markoff (exec.); Lavi$h; Beat Busta Beats; Young Jordan; Aktive; Chucky Beatz; Claudio Audio; Soundsmith Beats; Deborah's Son; Klasiq; Lew Jay

KXNG Crooked chronology
Statik KXNG (2016)	Good vs. Evil (2016)	Good vs. Evil II: The Red Empire (2017)

Professional ratings
Review scores
Source	Rating
Exclaim!	7/10
HipHopDX	4/5

Good vs. Evil is the third studio album by American rapper KXNG Crooked (formerly known as Crooked I). The album was released on November 11, 2016, through RBC Records and Entertainment One, marking KXNG Crooked's second release in a year. The album features cameo appearances from notable rappers such as Eminem, RZA, Xzibit, and Tech N9ne, among other guests.

The album was well-received by critics, who praised its direction, dark beats, and narrative skills. The album's sequel, Good vs. Evil II, was released on December 8, 2017.

== Track listing ==
Good vs. Evil track listing
No.	Title	Length
1.	"A Just Message" (Intro) (featuring Just Blaze)	2:52
2.	"Welcome to Planet X (We're Coming)" (featuring Eminem and the Observer)	4:14
3.	"Dem People" (featuring Xzibit and SAS)	3:05
4.	"Robocop Went Pop"	3:18
5.	"Rebel Party" (featuring The Observer)	3:22
6.	"I Want to Kill You" (featuring Astray and The Observer)	6:04
7.	"CrazyPsychoLoco"	4:22
8.	"Intergalactic Hustling" (featuring Boroc)	2:38
9.	"Revolutionary Funk" (featuring P Funk Pavarotti)	2:31
10.	"Shoot Back (Dear Officer)" (featuring Tech N9ne)	5:07
11.	"Obey (KXNG's Speech)"	5:05
12.	"The Oath"	2:41
13.	"KXNG Tut"	2:54
14.	"Puppet Master" (featuring RZA, KinG! and The Observer)	4:40
Total length:		52:55

Deluxe edition bonus tracks
No.	Title	Length
15.	"Kxng"	2:13
16.	"Next"	3:39
17.	"Scratch"	3:50
18.	"Song"	3:20
19.	"Experiment"	2:54
20.	"Fun"	3:02
Total length:		71:53
