= Jonathan Hay (publicist) =

American publicist, record producer, influencer, and entrepreneur

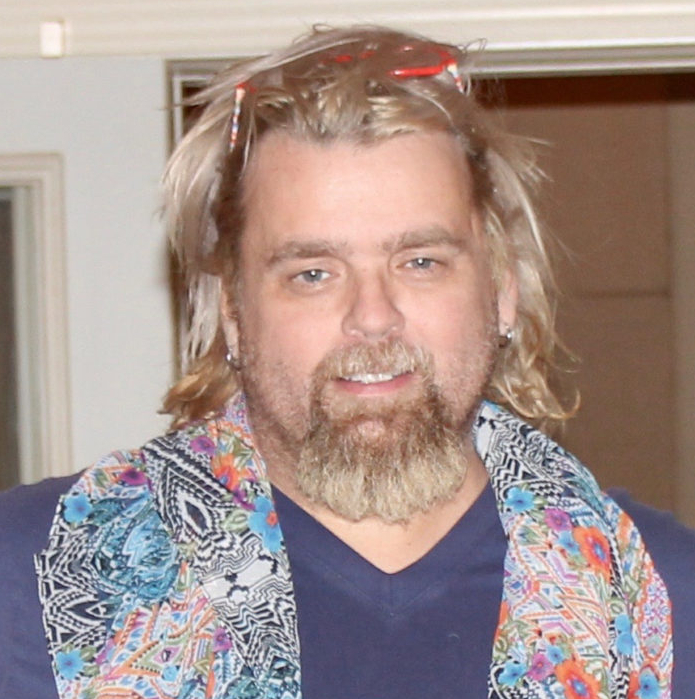
- Born: December 16, 1975 (age 50); Leesburg, Florida, U.S.
- Education: Waggener High School, Christian Academy of Louisville
- Occupations: Publicist; record producer; entrepreneur
- Years active: 1994–present

Jonathan Hay (born December 16, 1975) is an American publicist and record producer. Raised in Louisville, Kentucky, he is known for having publicized various works for music industry acts, such as Rihanna's 2005 debut single "Pon de Replay". In 2019, Hay's collaborative album with Eric B. & Rakim landed at No.1 on the Top Jazz Albums Billboard chart.

== Publicist career ==
Starting his career in the music business as a publicist, Hay launched his first professional project with Quo, a short-lived hip-hop duo signed to Michael Jackson's MJJ Productions. Subsequently, Hay worked with Jackson's producer Teddy Riley.

Hay achieved early success with Days of the New, a multi-platinum rock band that earned four hit singles, most notably "Touch, Peel and Stand", which Billboard named the "All-Time Greatest Mainstream Rock Song". In 2003, Travis Meeks, the lead singer of the group, criticized the publicist for making premature disclosures that the musician felt damaged his chances to advance his career with Guns N' Roses. Despite this conflict, Hay continued to work with Meeks years later.

Hay also worked as a publicist for Death Row Records, announcing the sale of its catalog to Hasbro. In 2012, Hay became involved in a guardianship case involving teenage actress Ariel Winter, a star on the television series Modern Family, and her mother, Chrisoula "Crystal" Workman. After Workman sent a cease and desist letter to Hay, he responded to TMZ, stating that he felt terrible a 14-year-old child had to suffer the consequences of her mother's unfortunate decisions. Hay later testified in court and signed a declaration supporting Winter's request to stay with her sister, Shanelle Workman Gray. In 2013, Hay publicized a book about the Kardashian family.

Hay was in both Vogue and Vanity Fair for a philanthropy project in Florida. Hay spoke out in Rolling Stone on March 24, 2016 (Issue 1257) to publicly support Kesha during her sexual assault lawsuit against Dr. Luke. The magazine called Hay a "crisis management expert".

Hay told The Sun that his frequent collaborator Cyhi The Prynce wrote the lyrics to "Famous", the song that caused the public battle between Taylor Swift, Kanye West and Kim Kardashian. According to Hollywood Life, a source close to West said, "Cyhi is a creative contributor on the song, in which he has been credited accordingly. However, the specific Taylor lyrics were written by Kanye himself."

In April 2017, Hay had involvement with the Drake and Sophie Brussaux pregnancy scandal. Hay told People Magazine, "I've seen the text messages and they do exist", in reference to conversations purportedly from Drake, urging Brussaux to undergo an abortion. Hay has spoken out about this situation with Perez Hilton, Glamour Magazine (in the Netherlands), Hollywood Life and Public Magazine (in France). In March 2025, Hay interviewed with Kat Tenbarge who previously worked for NBC News, in an effort to clarify the circumstances surrounding Sophie and Drake, shifting the responsibility onto a different publicist.

Hay stated to The Huffington Post that Kathy Griffin was "flat-out gross" for her President Donald Trump photo scandal. Defending the POTUS, Hay explained to HuffPost, "From a PR perspective, she did do the right thing, by apologizing … but still that isn't enough. Not even close." From the viewpoint of a crisis publicist, Hay was quoted in The New York Times about XXXTentacion's posthumous album release Skins. During October 2022, The Hindustan Times reported that Jonathan Hay worked an event for the Vice President of the United States.

In May 2025, Wired Magazine published an article in which Hay stated, "I blew the whistle as loud as I could" when he reported his former associate Mike Smith to the local authorities and the FBI in 2019. In September 2024, Smith was arrested and faces charges of wire fraud conspiracy, wire fraud, and money laundering conspiracy. Hay also interviewed with BBC News and Rolling Stone about the federal music streaming fraud case.

In a December 2025 statement to Deadline, Hay criticized Dave Chappelle for joking about Cassie Ventura's assault and expressing repeated support for Sean "Diddy" Combs in his Netflix special The Unstoppable.

== Pon de Replay ==
Hay met Kevin Skinner while working with Whitney Houston through her father's John Houston Entertainment company. In late 2004, Skinner introduced Hay to one of the co-producers of Rihanna's debut single "Pon de Replay". Hay was hired by the producer and Def Jam to promote the single and write her first press release, which became an MTV News item on March 17, 2005. Hay later reiterated to Us Weekly that he was hired specifically for that song by the co-producer, rather than by Rihanna herself.

In 2015, Becoming Beyoncé: The Untold Story by J. Randy Taraborrelli, an author on The New York Times Best Seller list, was released and detailed Hay's marketing tactics for the single. Hay appeared on the CBS national television show Inside Edition and publicly apologized to Beyoncé. He described the PR campaign as an attempt to help break "Pon de Replay" early in his career, telling Newsday that neither Rihanna nor Jay-Z were aware of his marketing strategies.

In 2024, Jonathan Hay conducted interviews with Jaguar Wright and Tisa Tells addressing the marketing tactics behind the song's launch.

== Production career ==
=== Hip-hop releases ===
Hay was a producer on the album Sex, Money and Hip-Hop by Crooked I, a member of Shady Records' now-defunct group Slaughterhouse. Hay executive produced an album featuring Johnny Depp and artists from Kentucky. Depp also appeared on the Hay produced Fear of a Pink Planet by Pink Grenade released in July 2014 on Caroline Records. Hay was a music producer on the BET TV show One Shot with T.I., RZA, DJ Khaled, Tech N9ne, Sway Calloway and others. WAVE (TV) reported that Hay abruptly left during filming of One Shot to focus on reuniting with his birth parents.

Hay released When Music Worlds Collide featuring popular rap artists from several different eras. Released as a streaming-only album with a "Spotify vs. TIDAL" challenge, receiving national coverage on Fox News, Billboard, and Business Insider. Hay's "Don't Close Your Eyes (Ashamed)", a song about suicide and alcohol abuse was a tribute to the late Keith Whitley to commemorate his 60th birthday. The video for "Don't Close Your Eyes (Ashamed)" premiered on MTV News. Hay and Kxng Crooked's "Too Ashamed", a sequel song to "Don't Close Your Eyes (Ashamed)" debuted on Billboard Magazine.

In June 2016, Hay produced a single for Snoop Dogg's Doggy Style Records. In August, Hay took a stand against Afrika Bambaataa with a remix featuring Ron "Bee Stinger" Savage. In the diss track, Jonathan replays the notes from Bambaataa's song "Planet Rock" while Savage speaks out about child molestation. Hay released albums with Kxng Crooked and Cyhi the Prynce that failed to chart. In April 2017, Hay was a producer on a song about Kylie Jenner and 21 Savage that debuted on TMZ. Later that year Hay collaborated with Conway the Machine, and Twista. In 2018, Hay produced for Riff Raff,DJ Whoo Kid, and Bubba Sparxxx. In 2019, Hay was one of the producers for Juicy J and Yung Bleu. In 2023, Hay collaborated with Solo Lucci from Love & Hip Hop.

=== Jazz and House music releases ===
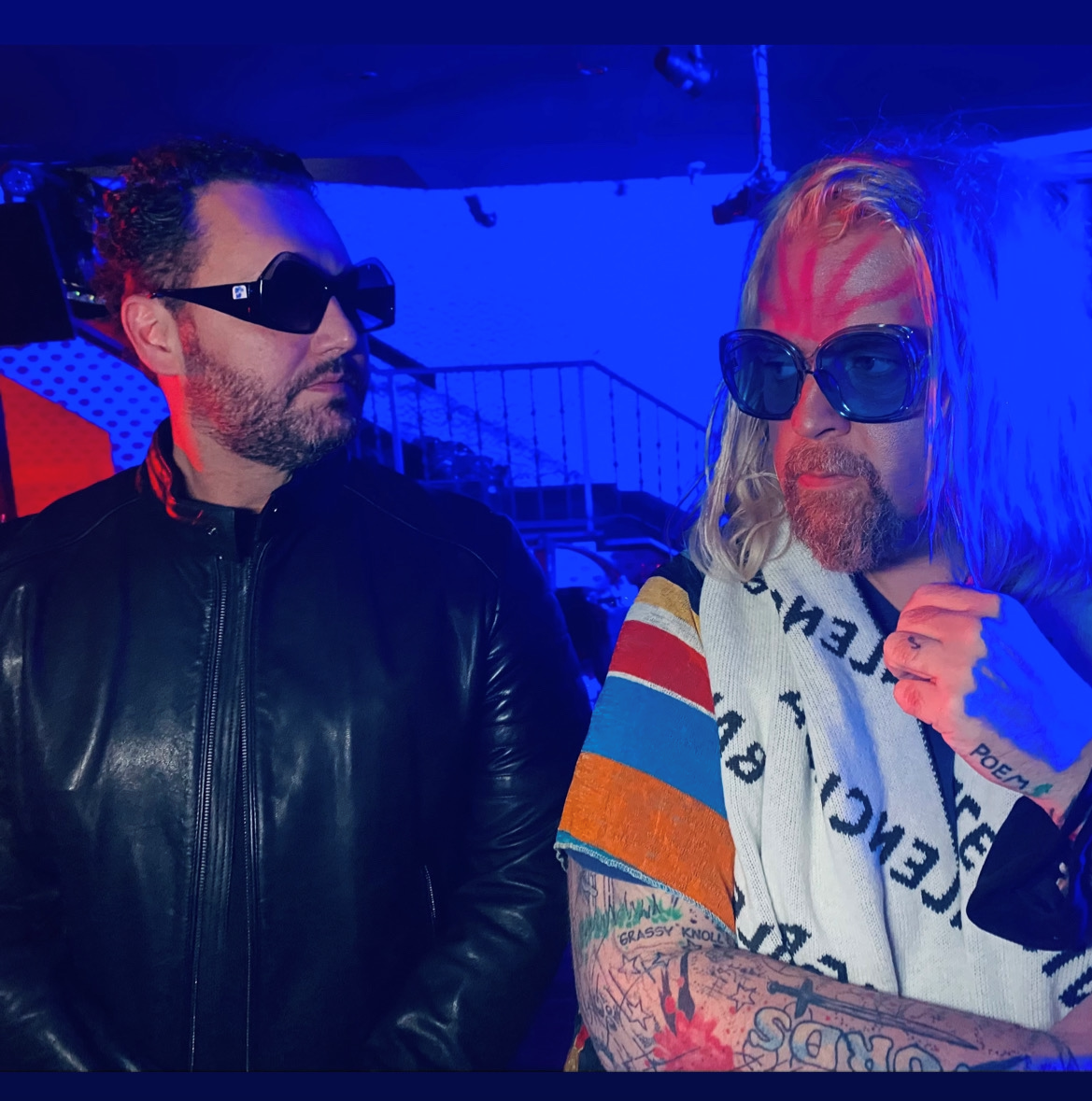
Jonathan Hay in Dallas, Texas by Chip E.

From 2018 to 2019, Hay produced three consecutive albums that reached No. 1 on Billboard's Jazz Albums or Contemporary Jazz Albums charts. His 2019 release Follow the Leader—a jazz reimagining of Eric B. & Rakim's classic album topped the Jazz Albums chart for 11 weeks and received GRAMMY consideration in the jazz category.

In an interview Billboard Magazine, Eric B. & Rakim talked about Hay's jazz rendition of Follow the Leader stating:

"I couldn't have done a better job myself and I created the original album (laughs). It's a great body of work, and all the guys should be so proud of themselves. The simple way to put it is that life imitates art, and art imitates life, and it's all coming around full circle." - Eric B as told to Billboard

Hay formed an electronic music label in 2020 with distribution through Ingrooves (part of Virgin Music Group), the global independent music division of Universal Music Group.

Hay co-produced Nirvana Reimagined as House and Techno a charity album for LGBTQ+, mental health and suicide awareness. The album has collaborations with Fishbone bassist John Norwood Fisher, trumpeter Maurice "Mobetta" Brown, Pink Floyd saxophonist Scott Page, J Patt of the Knocks and drummer Andy Kravitz.

GRAMMY's writer Morgan Enos stated:

"And while a fair amount of tomb-raiding has occurred on Kurt Cobain's behalf—Nirvana Reimagined is one of a few tributes that align with his principles."

Hay's "We Are the World (Contemporary Jazz Instrumental)" peaked at No. 18 on the United Kingdom Apple Music charts in March 2024.

In an interview with The Jewish Chronicle in October 2026, Hay stated that he intends to set a Guinness World Record with David Sugarman upon his return to the music industry.

== Collaboration with The Notorious B.I.G. estate, and Sean Combs ==
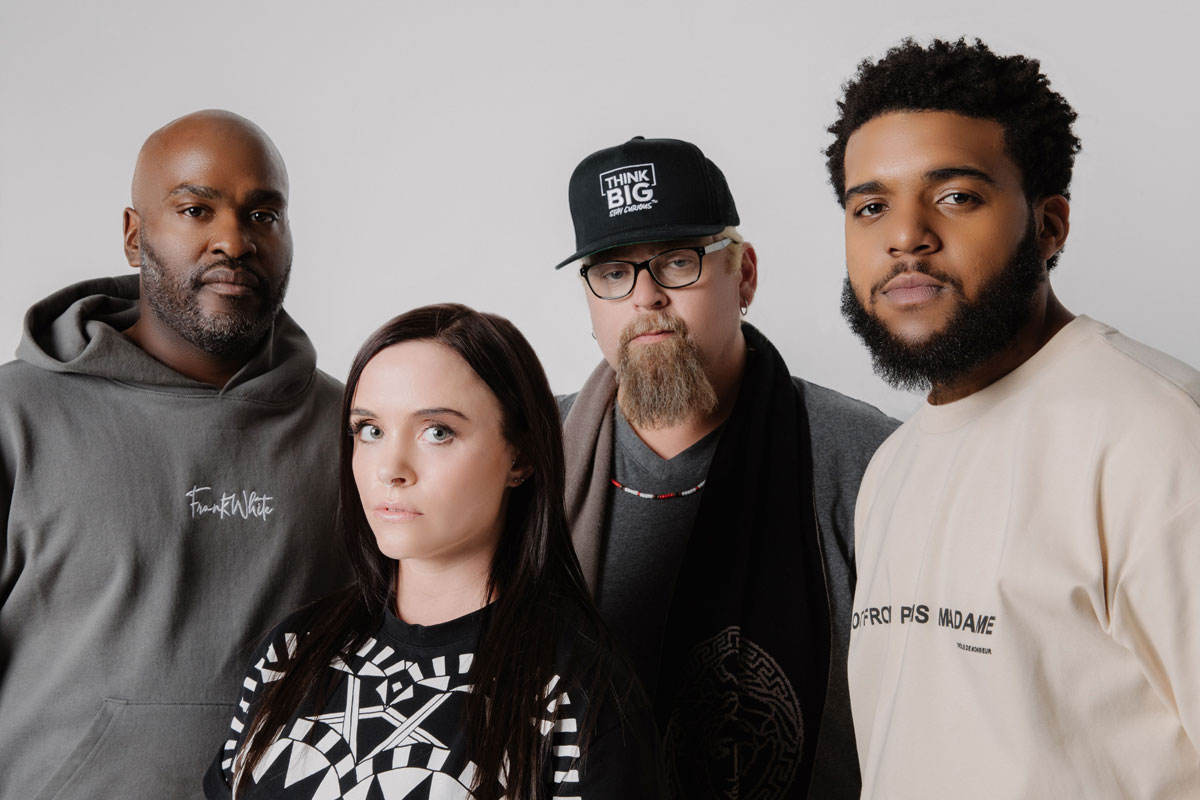
Jonathan Hay during "Big Poppa (House Mix)" release.

In 2020, Jonathan Hay entered into a recording contract with Christopher "C.J." Wallace, an heir to the estate of The Notorious B.I.G., which at the time had partnership with Sean 'Diddy' Combs.

Hay co-produced "Big Poppa (House Mix)" with Biggie's son 'C.J'., Diddy and others from the 'Frank White' team. Spin called the single "electrifying". Landing at #76 on the iTunes charts, the single could be seen as a disappointment in terms of commercial success.

Rolling Stone published Hay's statement to Perez Hilton about the collaboration:

"Our reimagination of 'Big Poppa' is laced with style and grace. With the original spirit of the Notorious B.I.G. spun into a new house classic. Dedicated to all the honeys getting money and the ravers dancing to the sounds from house gods like Martinez Brothers and Carl Cox, our aim was to create music that makes you wanna move and honor BIG's legacy."

The partnership fell apart and Hay released a house music remake of the Biggie, Diddy and Bad Boy Records diss track "Hit 'Em Up" through Fat Beats Records in late 2021.

In July 2025, Hay sued CJ Wallace, Sean Combs, Willie Mack and the Notorious B.I.G. LLC for sexual assault, battery and false imprisonment. Tampa Bay's Fox 13 reported the case has been referred to the Los Angeles County District Attorney's Office for potential criminal charges.

In November 2025, Wallace and The Notorious B.I.G.'s estate filed a countersuit against Hay for defamation seeking punitive and compensatory damages, claiming Hay's allegations are a calculated smear campaign.

A spokesperson for the Los Angeles County Sheriff's Department confirmed to CNN that their Special Victims Bureau is investigating Hay's allegations against Combs, Wallace and Mack. According to CNN, Hay had contemplated coming forward as early as March 2023, eight months before Cassie Ventura filed her lawsuit, and had contacted Cassie's legal team, Wigdor LLP regarding his allegations prior to her filing.

In March 2026, Los Angeles Superior Court Judge Michael E. Whitaker denied a motion to dismiss Hay's lawsuit against Combs, allowing for Hay's case to move forward toward trial. Hay is represented by trial attorney Gary Dordick in the civil litigation.

In May 2026, TMZ and Los Angeles Magazine reported on a new filing from Combs's defense team. The defense argued that Hay "welcomed" the alleged sexual conduct and asserted that the encounters were consensual. Additionally, the filing introduced a narrative involving a citizen's arrest, claiming that the physical restraint Hay described was a lawful response to his own conduct during the incidents.

In June 2026, NBC News reported that the LAPD and LASD each presented a separate sexual assault investigation regarding Hay to the Los Angeles County District Attorney's Office. A representative for District Attorney Nathan Hochman stated, “We are reviewing the case.”

In August 2026, a 15-day jury trial was scheduled for March 20, 2028, at the Beverly Hills Courthouse for the civil action Jonathan Hay v. Sean Combs et al. (Case No. 25SMCV03462), which names Combs, Wallace, Mack, and Notorious B.I.G. LLC among the defendants.

== Home invasion ==
On April 20, 2017, Jonathan Hay was a victim in a home invasion where he was held at gunpoint. Hay was bound by duct tape during the attack in the Mallard Crossing at St. Matthews apartment complex.

WHAS-TV and WAVE (TV) reported that St. Matthews Police arrested Michael Brooks and Louis Simmons Jr. and they were charged with first degree robbery, two counts of kidnapping, possession of a handgun by a convicted felon, receiving stolen property, possession of drug paraphernalia and two counts fraudulent use of a credit card. Quantez Gibson was the third person arrested. Gibson was sentenced to prison at the Kentucky State Reformatory for the two offenses of "criminal facilitation kidnapping and robbery".

== Politics ==
=== 2027 Kentucky gubernatorial campaign ===
In October 2026, Hay announced his candidacy as an independent candidate for Governor of Kentucky in the 2027 Kentucky gubernatorial election. Hay's platform focuses on institutional anti-corruption reform, victim advocacy, reproductive rights, and the integration of artificial intelligence (AI) tools in public education.

== Personal life ==
Hay is a Leesburg, Florida native. He went to Waggener High School but switched to a private school system to play basketball at Christian Academy of Louisville. His uncle is a founding elder of Southeast Christian Church, one of the largest churches in the United States. As of 2024, he is estranged from his adoptive family. He met his biological mother in February 2017; she would die four years later. In 2019, the media reported that Jonathan Hay and Adele were romantically involved after meeting in a recording studio in New York City. Adele and Hay declined to comment on the dating speculation. As of 2024, he lives in Brooklyn.
