= Sway & King Tech =

American hip hop group

- Also known as: Flynamic Force; Sway & Tech
- Origin: San Francisco, California, U.S.
- Genres: Hip-hop
- Years active: 1986–present
- Labels: Giant; Interscope; All City Music; Bungalo
- Members: Sway; King Tech

Sway & DJ King Tech is an American hip-hop duo from San Francisco, California, composed of Bay Area rapper Sway and DJ King Tech.

Also known as Flynamic Force or Sway & Tech, they are the hosts of the nationally syndicated show, The Wake Up Show. The duo first gained major prominence in the early 1990s on KMEL in San Francisco, where they were credited with helping to break artists from both the West and East Coasts during a period of intense regional tension.

In addition to their radio hosting, they have released four albums, mostly featuring other rappers, much of which was recorded while on their program. The duo is best known for their hit single, "The Anthem" from 1999's This or That, which peaked at No. 1 on the Billboard Top Heatseekers chart. The track featured a collection of rappers including RZA, Eminem, Tech N9ne, Xzibit, Pharoahe Monch, Jayo Felony, Chino XL, KRS-One and Kool G Rap.

== Discography ==
- Flynamic Force (1988)
- Concrete Jungle (1991)
- This or That (1999)
- Back 2 Basics (2005)
