= Good vs. Evil II: The Red Empire =

Studio album by KXNG Crooked
- Released: December 8, 2017
- Recorded: 2017
- Genre: Hip-hop; political hip-hop
- Length: 50:13
- Label: C.O.B. LLC; Empire
- Producer: Lavish; Aktive; Snaz; C-Wash; Jay Wash; Illeagle; ENG; Audio Jones; Mr. Authentic

KXNG Crooked chronology
Good vs. Evil (2016)	Good vs. Evil II: The Red Empire (2017)

Singles from Good vs. Evil II: The Red Empire
- 1. "Truth (Why You Mad)" Released: October 25, 2017; 2. "The MAGA Continues" Released: November 22, 2017

Good vs. Evil II: The Red Empire is the fourth studio album by American rapper KXNG Crooked (formerly known as Crooked I). The album was released on December 8, 2017, through C.O.B. LLC and Empire Distribution. The album features guest appearances by Royce da 5'9", Styles P, Jay Townsend, among others.

== Background ==
On March 20, 2017, Crooked I posted an image via social media with the caption "Burnin incense to set the vibe.. GVE2", which suggested a sequel to his previous album Good vs Evil. On March 28, 2017, Crooked I confirmed on Twitter that his upcoming album would indeed be a sequel to Good vs. Evil. In an interview with XXL Magazine, Crooked I stated that the new record will be more politically-driven in comparison to the album's predecessor, with lyrics dealing with subjects such as social injustice, racism, classism, and consumerism. The album's cover art features United States president Donald Trump kneeling before a committee of people such as Adolf Hitler, Joseph Stalin, and Bin Laden.

The album's lead single, "Truth (Why You Mad)", featuring Royce da 5'9", was released on October 25, 2017. The cover art and tracklist for the album were revealed the same day. The second single, "The MAGA Continues", was released on November 22, 2017.

== Critical reception ==
Good vs. Evil II: The Red Empire received generally positive reviews from critics. At the music website HotNewHipHop, the album received an average score of 4.2 out of 5 stars (83%), based on 15 reviews.

== Track listing ==
No.	Title	Producer(s)	Length
1.	"Wake Up Show" (Intro)		1:15
2.	"The MAGA Continues"	Lavish	2:23
3.	"Red Hood's Plot (Hahahaha)"	Lavish	1:54
4.	"GiveUDatHammer"	Aktive	3:27
5.	"Revolution Come" (featuring Jai)	Snaz	4:39
6.	"Truth (Why You Mad)" (featuring Royce da 5'9")	C-Wash	4:49
7.	"Shoot Back 2 (Dear Officer) / Train Tracks"	Jay Wash	6:06
8.	"Adderall Addicts"	C-Wash	3:17
9.	"Cowboy Bebop"	Illeagle	3:12
10.	"Thug Poetry" (featuring Jay Townsend)	Snaz	2:41
11.	"City Lights"	ENG	4:13
12.	"Brainwashed Ni666a"	Audio Jones	2:51
13.	"Stand" (featuring Styles P and Emanny)	Lavish	4:20
14.	"Mace Windu"	Mr. Authentic	5:06
Total length:			50:13
