= Beyond Good and Evil (disambiguation) =

Beyond Good and Evil is a book by Friedrich Nietzsche.

Beyond Good and Evil may also refer to:

- Beyond Good and Evil (album), a 2001 album by The Cult
- Beyond Good and Evil (film), a 1977 Italian-French film by Liliana Cavani
- Beyond Good & Evil (video game), a 2003 action-adventure video game
  - Beyond Good and Evil 2, an upcoming prequel
- "Beyond Good and Evil" (X-Men episode), a four-part episode of the animated TV series X-Men
- Jenseits von Gut und Böse (album), or Beyond Good and Evil, a 2011 album by Bushido
- "Beyond Good and Evil", a 1993 song by At the Gates from With Fear I Kiss the Burning Darkness
- "Beyond Good and Evil", a 2008 song by Grand Magus from Iron Will
- "Beyond Good and Evil", a 2014 song by Machinae Supremacy from Phantom Shadow

== See also ==
- "She is Beyond Good and Evil", a 1979 song by The Pop Group
- Xenosaga Episode II: Jenseits von Gut und Böse, a 2004 video game
