= Concrete Jungle (Sway & King Tech album) =

Studio album by Sway & King Tech
- Released: 1991
- Recorded: 1990
- Genre: Hip hop
- Length: 66:54
- Label: Giant; Warner Bros. Records; 24419
- Producer: King Tech

Sway & King Tech chronology
Flynamic Force (1988)	Concrete Jungle (1991)	This or That (1999)

Concrete Jungle is the debut album by the American hip hop duo Sway & King Tech. The album was released in 1991 by Giant Records. It was nominated for a Bammie Award for best debut album.

According to Tech, the 1990 single release of "Follow 4 Now" sold 40,000 vinyl, 40,000 cassettes and 20,000 CDs. A remix of the song appears on the album.

== Critical reception ==
Professional ratings
Review scores
Source	Rating
AllMusic	3/5 stars
Chicago Tribune	1/4 stars

The Chicago Tribune noted the irony of "Same Old Thang", which criticizes the tiresome sameness of rap music.

== Track listing ==
1. "Intro"
2. "Concrete Jungle"
3. "Devastating"
4. "Baddest Mutha on 2 Turntables [Remix]"
5. "Rock Steady"
6. "Let Me See You Move"
7. "New Dimension"
8. "Future Source"
9. "In Control"
10. "Bum Rush the Sound"
11. "Time 4 Peace"
12. "Follow 4 Now [Remix]"
13. "It's Not Over"
14. "Same Old Thang"
