= King Tech =

American rapper

DJ King Tech
- Born: Rod Sepand; June 30, 1968 (age 58); Bay Area, California
- Occupations: B-boy; DJ; VJ and audio engineer
- Years active: 1986–present

Rod Sepand (born June 30, 1968), better known professionally as DJ King Tech, is an American DJ, B-boy, VJ and audio engineer. He is one half of the duo Sway & King Tech.

== Career ==
DJ King Tech began his career in the hip hop scene as a B-Boy in the Bay Area. He initially joined the musical crews "Master City Breakers" and "Flynamic Force," performing with them regularly. As the popularity of B-Boy crews started to decline, he met Sway Calloway, and the two formed a dynamic partnership. With King Tech handling the turntables and Sway on the microphone, they represented Flynamic Force on their debut single, "We Wanna Rock You," which sold 40,000 copies in the Bay Area. Their second single, "Follow For Now," sold over 140,000 copies.

Well-known on the local scene, Tech and Sway chose to start their own record label, All City Records, rather than signing with an existing one. This venture allowed them to release their music independently. Their indie release "Follow 4 Now/Time 4 Peace" achieved significant success, leading to a major label deal with Giant Records and the release of their LP "Concrete Jungle."

Upon entering and winning a local competition, the duo were given a one-shot deal for a 40-minute mix on local radio station 106.1 KMEL. Radio execs realized that the show can be a success with DJ King Tech on the mix and Sway as the front man. The show was named The Wake Up Show, featured music and interviews with well-known hip hop artists as well as up-and-coming ones. The show became very popular and later became NYC’s premiere Hip Hop outlet which aided Eminem to get his start at a very early stage. King Tech is also noted for helping out Wu-Tang Clan and Jay Z’s career in their early stages. The duo from The Bay Area were changing the face of not just urban radio but popular music in general and the way that it was played and appreciated on regular FM dials across the planet. King Tech was named one of the 50 Most Influential DJ’s of all time by BET.

The popularity of the show helped duo in getting another major label record deal with Interscope Records. The album, This or That, reached #30 on Billboard's R&B/Hip-Hop Albums chart and #1 on the Top Heatseekers chart in 1999.

In 2016, King Tech is one of the four main judges on the reality show One Shot. The show will be aired on BET in August 2016.

== Discography ==
=== Albums ===
Year	Album details	Record
1991	Concrete Jungle 5 versions	Giant Records
1994	Best Of The Wake Up Show Free Styles '94 Vol. 1 6 versions	All City Records
1996	The Wake-Up Show Mix Tape 2 versions	
1996	Wake Up Show Freestyles Vol. 3 3 versions	
1998	Wake Up Show Freestyles Vol. 4 2 versions	360 Enterprizes
1999	Sway & King Tech featuring DJ Revolution - This Or That 5 versions	Interscope Records
1999	Wake Up Show Freestyles Vol. 5 2 versions	
1999	The Wake Up Show 9th Anniversary Live Album ?(CD, Album)	
2000	Wake Up Show Freestyles Vol. 6 2 versions	
2001	Wake Up Show Freestyles Vol. 7 2 versions	
2004	Wake Up Show Freestyles Vol. 8 2 versions	Bolo Entertainment
2005	Back 2 Basics 3 versions	Bungalo Records
	Hip Hop Wars ?(LP)	Ground Level Distribution

=== Singles & EPs ===
Year	Album details	Record
1988	Flynamic Force 3 versions	All City Records
1990	Follow 4 Now / Time 4 Peace 9 versions	All City Records
1991	In Control / Devastating / Bum Rush The Sound 2 versions	Giant Records
1999	Sway & King Tech Featuring DJ Revolution - The Anthem / Underground Tactics 4 versions	Interscope Records
1999	Get You Mad 3 versions	Interscope Records
2001	Sway & King Tech, Crooked I - Wake Up Show Freestyles	
2004	Trouble / Everything 2 versions	Up Above Records
2004	Sway & King Tech feat. Chino XL - Trouble (CD, Single, Promo)	Bungalo Records, Bolo Entertainment
2004	I Don't Think So / I Wish U Would (12")	Up Above Records
2004	Back 2 Basics: Watch Closer 3 versions	Up Above Records

=== Compilations ===
Year	Album details	Record
1996	Wake Up Show Unreleased Project Vol. #1 (CD, Album, Comp)	All City Records
1996	Wake Up Show Freestyles Vol. 2 3 versions	Not On Label
