= DJ Whoo Kid =

American rapper

- Also known as: The Mixtape King • The Haitian Sensation
- Born: Yves Mondesir; October 12, 1972 (age 53); Brooklyn, New York City, U.S.
- Origin: Queens, New York City, U.S.
- Genres: Hip hop
- Occupations: DJ; producer
- Years active: 1995–present
- Labels: Capitol; G-Unit
- Website: DJ Whoo Kid on Facebook www.justwhookid.com

Yves Mondesir (born October 12, 1972), better known by his stage name DJ Whoo Kid, is a Haitian-American hip-hop DJ. He is signed with G-Unit Records, its subsidiary, Shadyville Entertainment and was 50 Cent and G-Unit's tour DJ. Mondesir had two albums chart on the Billboard 200: XXL Presents: Bad Season with Tech N9ne (#118 in 2011) and The Whoodlum Ball with Smith and Hay and Ranna Royce (#156 in 2018).

== Early life ==
DJ Whoo Kid, born Yves Mondesir on October 12, 1972, in Brooklyn, New York, is of Haitian descent. He was raised in Queens Village, Queens, and maintains strong ties to Cap-Haïtien, Haiti.
