= Joe Budden discography =

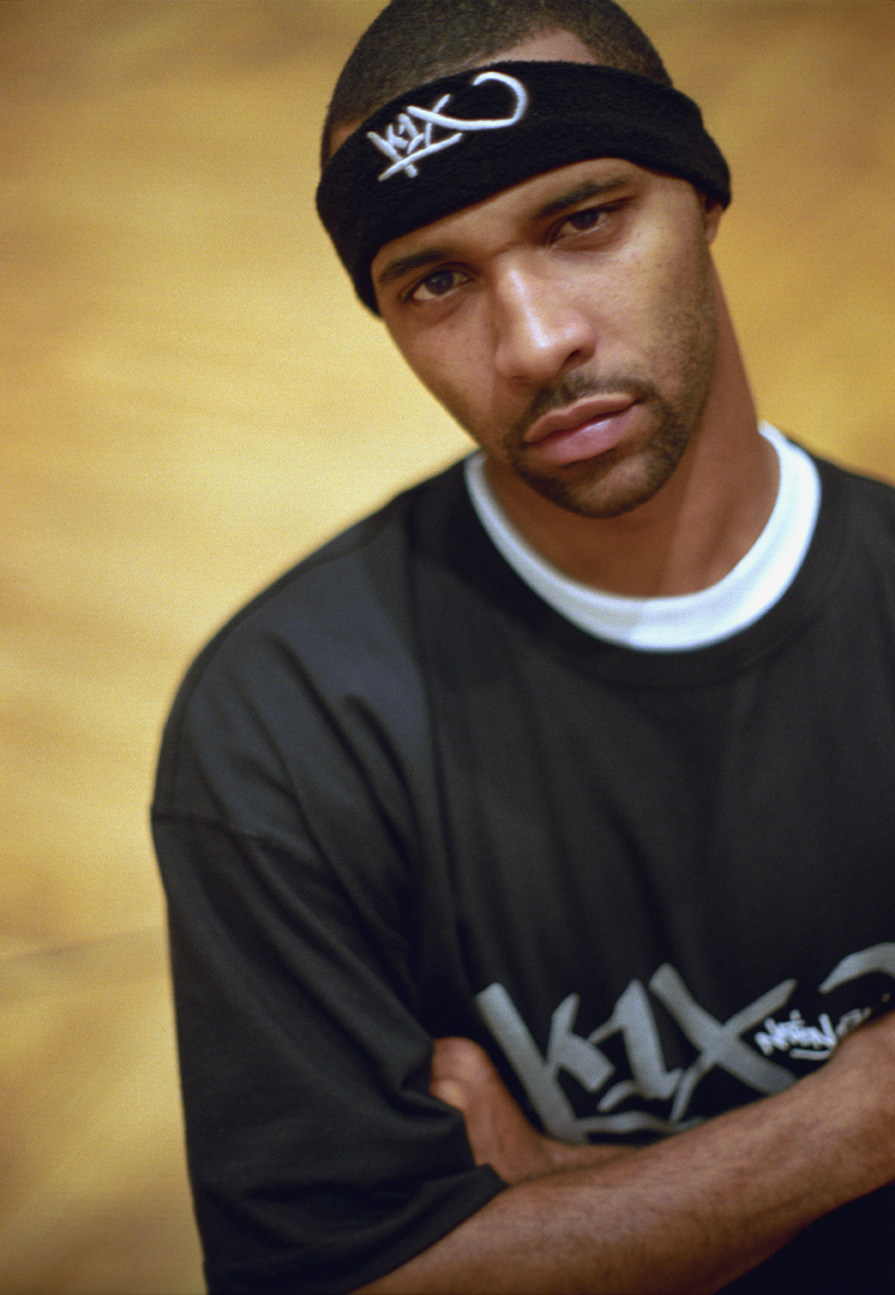
- Budden in 2003
- Studio albums: 8
- Extended plays: 1
- Singles: 26
- Music videos: 9
- Mixtapes: 6
- Featured singles: 6
- Guest appearances: 30
- Collaboration albums: 2

This is the discography of American rapper Joe Budden.

== Albums ==
=== Studio albums ===
List of studio albums, with selected chart positions and sales figures
| Title | Album details | Peak chart positions | | | | Sales |
| Title | Album details | US | US R&B | US Rap | UK | Sales |
|---|---|---|---|---|---|---|
| Joe Budden | Released: June 10, 2003; Label: Def Jam; Format: CD, digital download | 8 | 2 | 1 | 55 | US: 430,000 |
| Mood Muzik 3: The Album | Released: February 26, 2008; Label: Amalgam Digital; Format: CD, digital download | — | 88 | — | — | |
| Halfway House | Released: October 28, 2008; Label: Amalgam Digital; Format: CD, digital download | 184 | — | — | — | |
| Padded Room | Released: February 24, 2009; Label: Amalgam Digital; Format: CD, digital download | 42 | 21 | 6 | — | |
| Escape Route | Released: August 11, 2009; Label: Amalgam Digital; Format: CD, digital download | — | 47 | 22 | — | |
| No Love Lost | Released: February 5, 2013; Label: Mood Muzik, E1 Music; Format: CD, digital download | 15 | 1 | 1 | — | |
| All Love Lost | Released: October 16, 2015; Label: Mood Muzik, E1 Music; Format: CD, digital download | 29 | 6 | 5 | — | |
| Rage & The Machine | Released: October 21, 2016; Label: Mood Muzik, Empire; Format: CD, digital download | 40 | 1 | 2 | — | |

=== Collaborative albums ===
List of collaborative albums, with selected chart positions and sales figures
| Title | Album details | Peak chart positions | | | Sales |
| Title | Album details | US | US R&B | US Rap | Sales |
|---|---|---|---|---|---|
| Slaughterhouse (with Slaughterhouse) | Released: August 11, 2009; Label: E1 Music; Format: CD, digital download | 25 | 4 | 2 | US: 74,000 |
| Welcome to: Our House (with Slaughterhouse) | Released: August 28, 2012; Label: Shady, Interscope; Format: CD, digital download | 2 | 1 | 1 | |

== Mixtapes ==
List of mixtapes, with selected chart positions
| Title | Mixtape details | Peak chart positions | | | |
| Title | Mixtape details | US | US R&B | US Rap | US Ind |
|---|---|---|---|---|---|
| Mood Muzik 1: The Worst of Joe Budden | Released: December 9, 2003; Label: Self-released; Format: Digital download | — | — | — | — |
| Mood Muzik 2: Can It Get Any Worse? | Released: December 26, 2005; Label: Self-released; Format: Digital download | — | — | — | — |
| Mood Muzik 3: For Better or for Worse | Released: December 15, 2007; Label: Self-released; Format: Digital download | — | — | — | — |
| Mood Muzik 3.5 | Released: December 21, 2007; Label: Self-released; Format: Digital download | — | — | — | — |
| Mood Muzik 4: A Turn 4 the Worst | Released: October 26, 2010; Label: Self-released; Format: Digital download | — | — | — | — |
| Mood Muzik 4.5: The Worst Is Yet To Come | Released: May 24, 2011; Label: Self-released; Format: Digital download | — | — | — | — |
| A Loose Quarter | Released: November 20, 2012; Label: Self-released; Format: Digital download | — | — | — | — |
| Some Love Lost | Released: November 4, 2014; Label: Mood Muzik, E1 Music; Format: CD, digital download | 55 | 6 | 5 | 1 |

== Singles ==
=== As lead artist ===
| Year | Title | Chart positions | | | | | Certifications | Album |
| Year | Title | US | US R&B | US Rap | GER | UK | Certifications | Album |
|---|---|---|---|---|---|---|---|---|
| 2002 | "Breathe On 'Em" | — | — | — | — | — | | Non-album singles |
| 2002 | "Get Right with Me" | — | — | — | — | — | | Non-album singles |
| 2002 | "Focus" | — | 73 | — | — | — | | Joe Budden/ 2 Fast 2 Furious (soundtrack) |
| 2003 | "Pump It Up" | 38 | 16 | 10 | 80 | 13 | RIAA: Gold | Joe Budden |
| 2003 | "Fire" (featuring Busta Rhymes) | — | 48 | — | — | 128 | | Joe Budden |
| 2004 | "Body Heat" | — | — | — | — | — | | The Growth |
| 2004 | "Pop Off" | — | — | — | — | — | | The Growth |
| 2004 | "Not Your Average Joe" (featuring Joe and Fat Joe) | — | 63 | — | — | 135 | | The Growth |
| 2005 | "Gangsta Party" (featuring Nate Dogg) | — | 94 | — | — | — | | The Growth |
| 2007 | "Star Inside of Me" (featuring Suzzy Q) | — | — | — | — | — | | Mood Muzik 3: The Album |
| 2008 | "Touch & Go" | — | — | — | — | — | | Halfway House |
| 2008 | "The Future" (featuring The Game and Dominic) | — | — | — | — | — | | Padded Room |
| 2009 | "In My Sleep" | — | — | — | — | — | | Padded Room |
| 2011 | "Tipsy" (featuring Jay Townsend and Emanny) | — | — | — | — | — | | Non-album singles |
| 2011 | "Ayo" (featuring Emanny) | — | — | — | — | — | | Non-album singles |
| 2012 | "She Don't Put It Down" (featuring Lil Wayne and Tank) | 96 | 32 | 25 | — | — | | No Love Lost |
| 2013 | "NBA" (featuring French Montana and Wiz Khalifa) | — | 56 | — | — | — | | No Love Lost |
| 2014 | "OLS4" | — | — | — | — | — | | Some Love Lost |
| 2015 | "F'Em All" | — | — | — | — | — | | All Love Lost |
| 2015 | "Broke" | — | — | — | — | — | | All Love Lost |
| 2015 | "Slaughtermouse" | — | — | — | — | — | | All Love Lost |
| 2016 | "Flex" (featuring Fabolous and Tory Lanez) | — | — | — | — | — | | Rage & The Machine |
| 2016 | "Making a Murderer Pt. 1" | — | — | — | — | — | | —N/a |
| 2016 | "Wake" | — | — | — | — | — | | —N/a |
| 2016 | "By Law" (featuring Jazzy) | — | — | — | — | — | | Rage & The Machine |

"—" denotes releases that did not chart.

=== As featured artist ===
| Year | Title | Chart positions | | | | | Album |
| Year | Title | US | US R&B | GER | UK | JPN | Album |
|---|---|---|---|---|---|---|---|
| 2002 | "Get with Me (Remix)" (3rd Storee featuring Joe Budden) | — | — | — | — | — | Get With Me |
| 2002 | "The One (Remix)" (Jennifer Lopez featuring Joe Budden) | — | — | — | — | — | This Is Me... Then |
| 2003 | "Last Words" (Ai featuring Joe Budden) | — | — | — | — | 29 | Original Ai |
| 2003 | "Clubbin'" (Marques Houston featuring Joe Budden and Pied Piper) | 39 | 12 | — | 15 | — | MH |
| 2004 | "Whatever U Want" (Christina Milian featuring Joe Budden) | 100 | 91 | 51 | 9 | — | It's About Time |
| 2004 | "I Want You" (Eko Fresh and Valezka featuring Joe Budden) | — | — | 57 | — | — | L.O.V.E. |
| 2006 | "Classit u'Parsi" (Subliminal featuring Joe Budden and Miri Ben-Ari) | — | — | — | — | — | —N/a |
| 2013 | "Keep Staring" (Slur featuring Joe Budden) | — | — | — | — | — | Pills & Spilled Beer |

"—" denotes releases that did not chart.

== Guest appearances ==
List of non-single guest appearances, with other performing artists, showing year released and album name
| Title | Year | Other artist(s) | Album |
|---|---|---|---|
| "Make U Wanna Stay" | 2002 | Kelly Rowland | Simply Deep |
| "Coast to Coast Gangstas" | 2003 | DJ Kay Slay, Bun B, Killer Mike, Sauce Money, WC, Hak Ditty | The Streetsweeper |
| "Ride Up" | 2003 | Kendrick Lamar, Freeway | Y.N.I.C. (Hub City Threat: Minor of the Year) |
| "Drop Drop" | 2003 | —N/a | Cradle 2 the Grave (soundtrack) |
| "Pop Off" | 2004 | —N/a | Johnson Family Vacation (soundtrack) |
| "L.O.V.E." | 2004 | Christina Milian | It's About Time |
| "12:00" | 2005 | Marques Houston | Naked |
| "This Is Family" | 2007 | Fabolous, Red Cafe, Ransom, FReckles Billionaire | From Nothin' to Somethin' |
| "Nobody Fucking with Us" | 2010 | Royce da 5'9", Bun B, Crooked I | Bar Exam 3 |
| "Redemption" | 2010 | Kutt Calhoun | Raw and Un-Kutt |
| "My Own Planet" | 2011 | Royce da 5'9", Mr. Porter | Success Is Certain |
| "Money on My Head" | 2011 | Par-City | Civilized Sessions |
| "No Sleep" | 2011 | D-Pryde | Mars |
| "Unusual" | 2011 | Classified | Handshakes and Middle Fingers |
| "I Messed Up" | 2012 | Emanny | Songs About HER |
| "Climax" (Remix) | 2012 | Usher | —N/a |
| "Want You Back" | 2012 | Fabolous, Teyana Taylor | The S.O.U.L. Tape 2 |
| "Trouble" | 2012 | Omarion | Care Package |
| "Talkin' to You" | 2012 | R-Mean | 7 Deadly Sins |
| "Future" (Remix) | 2013 | Taliq | —N/a |
| "Make That Ass Clap" | 2013 | Remo the Hitmaker | —N/a |
| "Loaded Gun" | 2013 | Tsu Surf | A New Mood |
| "Once in a While" | 2013 | Fame | Phuck Ya Co-Sign |
| "Insanity Plea Pt. 1 & 2" | 2013 | Honors English | State of the Art Reimagined 1.5 |
| "Miss Me" | 2013 | Emanny | Songs About HER 2 and Songs About You EP |
| "Won't Be Today" | 2014 | Chris Webby | The Checkup |
| "Affirmative Action Freestyle" | 2015 | Fabolous, Paul Cain | Friday Night Freestyles |
| "Conversations" | 2015 | Tsu Surf | Newark |
| "Transitions" | 2016 | Lloyd Banks | All or Nothing: Live It Up |
| "Chopping Block" | 2017 | Royce da 5'9" | The Bar Exam 4 |
| "That's Me" | 2018 | T-Pain, Joey Badass | Everything Must Go Vol.1 |
| "Started" | 2019 | AZ, DJ Premier | Legacy |
| "Doo Wop Freestyle '99" | 2025 | Big L | Harlem's Finest: Return of the King |

== Music videos ==
| Year | Song | Director |
|---|---|---|
| 2003 | "Pump It Up/Focus" | Erik White |
| 2004 | "Fire (Yes, Yes Y'all)" | Paul Hunter/Kevin Hunter |
| 2007 | "Star Inside of Me" | Rik Cordero |
| 2008 | "Touch & Go" | James Platinum |
| 2009 | "In My Sleep" | Rik Cordero |
| 2009 | "Exxxes" | John Colombo |
| 2010 | "Follow My Lead" | Walu |
| 2014 | "OLS4" | Eif Rivera |
| 2015 | "Broke" | Eif Rivera |
