= No Love Lost (Joe Budden album) =

Studio album by Joe Budden
- Released: February 5, 2013
- Recorded: 2011–2012
- Genre: Hip hop
- Length: 71:49
- Label: Mood Muzik; E1
- Producer: 8 Bars; A6; Allen Ritter; Boi-1da; Beewirks; Cardiak; Darknight; Frequency; KdotOnTheBeat; Mizfitz Soundz; Sean C & LV; SLV; T-Minus; Vinylz

Joe Budden chronology
Escape Route (2009)	No Love Lost (2013)	Some Love Lost (2014)

Singles from No Love Lost
- 1. "She Don't Put It Down" Released: October 10, 2012; 2. "NBA" Released: March 26, 2013

No Love Lost is the sixth studio album by American rapper Joe Budden. The album was released on February 5, 2013, under E1 Music. The album features guest appearances from French Montana, Fabolous, Lil Wayne, Lloyd Banks, Juicy J, Slaughterhouse, Tank, Kirko Bangz, Wiz Khalifa, Twista, and Omarion among others.

The album's release was supported by two singles: "She Don't Put It Down" featuring Lil Wayne and Tank, and "NBA" featuring Wiz Khalifa and French Montana.

== Background ==
Budden has stated that the album is actually the final piece of the four album concept, which includes Halfway House, Padded Room and Escape Route, as he finally finds salvation and freedom from a sense of confinement that had been pervading his life and career.

On August 11, 2009, Amalgam Digital and Budden released a digital-only album entitled Escape Route, the third piece of the four album concept. Budden said that Escape Route would give fans a taste of what to expect from him on his third studio effort. In September 2010, Budden signed to E1 Music, so the album was not released under Amalgam Digital. At the end of 2012 Joe Budden embarked on the Second First Impression Tour. Budden says this album will show his maturity and growth as an artist.

On November 22, 2012, Joe Budden released the mixtape "A Loose Quarter" to positive critical feedback. It features Ab-Soul, Royce da 5'9" and Kobe, among others.

== Guests and production ==
On August 31, 2009, a potential single for the album named "No Competition" featuring R&B singer Emanny was leaked unto the internet. The song was produced by J.U.S.T.I.C.E. League. On January 29, 2010, Budden released a now-scrapped track for the album named "Downfall" via his Twitter page. Budden stated that he and J.Cardim were not able to clear a sample from the track, leading to it being scrapped from the album. The song was later released as a part of Mood Muzik 4.5.

In August 2010, Budden stated that the producer DJ Premier had a beat potentially for No Love Lost. On January 5, 2010, Budden hinted via Twitter that Havoc from Mobb Deep made a beat for No Love Lost. In an interview on November 18, 2012, he revealed that there will also be tracks produced by Cardiak and AraabMuzik on the album. The next day he revealed Beewirks, gentlemen by the name of Dark Night and 8 Bars, Blessed By The Beats and his own underground group SLV (Summer Leather Vest) also among the production.

Guest features on the album were to include Twista, Wiz Khalifa, French Montana, Lil Wayne and Lupe Fiasco. Joe Budden later said he recorded many songs with Black Hippy's Ab-Soul. In December 2012 Joe said in an interview with Hard Knock TV that there is a song with Juicy J and Lloyd Banks on it. Also saying Omarion and Kirko Bangz will be featured on the album. Budden indicated that this album will have more features than any of his previous albums. The final track list revealed Emanny and Slaughterhouse also as featured artists on the project.

== Singles ==
On February 27, 2012, at a concert, Budden previewed a new track featuring Lil Wayne, and R&B singer Tank called “Put It Down Like You”. On October 10, E1 Music released the first song from the album, "She Don't Put It Down Like You", which featured fellow rapper Lil Wayne and R&B singer Tank. The track was produced by T-Minus. The remix was also included on the album and it features Fabolous and Twista. A music video was shot in January 2013 for the remix. On February 5, 2013, the music video was released for "She Don't Put It Down" (Remix) featuring Fabolous, Lil Wayne and Tank.

On November 28, 2012, he announced his second single to be "NBA". The song features Wiz Khalifa and French Montana. On March 26, 2013, the music video was released for "NBA". That same day it would be released to iTunes as the album's second single.

He also filmed a music video for the song "Castles", for which the trailer was released on February 5, 2013. On March 19, 2013, the music video was released for "Castles".

== Critical response ==
Professional ratings
Review scores
Source	Rating
AllMusic	3.5/5 stars
The Boston Globe	2/5 stars
DJBooth.net	4/5 stars
Exclaim!	7/10
HipHopDX	3/5 stars
PopMatters	4/10 medals
The Quietus	5/10
RapReviews	6/10
XXL	4/5 (XL)

No Love Lost was met with generally mixed reviews from music critics. At Metacritic, which assigns a weighted mean rating out of 100 to reviews from mainstream critics, the album received an average score of 57, based on 9 reviews, which indicates "mixed reviews". Roman Cooper of HipHopDX gave the album three out of five stars saying, "The most glaring issue with No Love Lost is the truly terrible production featured throughout. “Castles” and “All in My Head” are more lush and interesting, but too much of the album is glittery, banal R&B a la “Switch Positions.”" Grant Jones of RapReviews gave the album a six out of ten, saying "In short bursts, tracks like "Skeletons" and "You And I" are excellent examples of Joe Budden, and "She Don't Put It Down" is as infectious as any other single in 2013. But ultimately, "No Love Lost" is too inconsistent to leave a lasting impression, and falls short of greatness."

David Jeffries of Allmusic gave the album three and a half stars out of five, saying "So many highlights make the album trophy-case worthy, but the best party numbers sit right next to one another, and long stretches of emo and midtempo threaten to alienate newcomers." Christopher Minaya of XXL gave the album an XL, saying "With No Love Lost, none of Budden’s fans lose. He has something for all of them." Ken Capobianco of The Boston Globe gave the album two stars out of five, saying "Budden has been releasing tart, clever music for a decade, but he sounds completely adrift here, struggling to articulate vulnerability or trying to figure out relationships. More problematic, he seems to have cherry-picked beats off a thrift store rack."

== Commercial performance ==
The album debuted at number 15 on the US Billboard 200 chart, with first-week sales of 30,000 copies in the United States. As of October 2015, the album has sold 86,000 copies in the United States

== Track listing ==
- All song samples, writing and production credits are according to the album booklet.

No.	Title	Writer(s)	Producer(s)	Length
1.	"Our First Again (Intro)"	Joseph Budden; Emanny Saldago; R. Valley	SLV	1:56
2.	"Top of the World" (featuring Kirko Bangz)	Budden; Andrew Johnson; Salem Brown; Damany Leggett; Kirk Randle	Mizfitz Soundz	3:47
3.	"She Don't Put It Down" (featuring Lil Wayne and Tank)	Budden; Durrell Babbs; Dwayne Carter; Tyler Williams	T-Minus	4:03
4.	"NBA" (featuring Wiz Khalifa and French Montana)	Budden; Anderson Hernandez; Matthew Samuels; Cameron Thomaz; Karim Kharbouch	Vinylz; Boi-1da	5:05
5.	"You and I" (featuring Emanny)	Budden; Salgado; Carl McCormick; Karon Graham	Cardiak; KdotOnTheBeat (co.)	4:15
6.	"Castles"	Budden; Hernandez; Allen Ritter	Vinylz; Ritter	3:35
7.	"All in My Head" (featuring Royce da 5'9" and Kobe)	Budden; Ryan Montgomery; McCormick; Brian Honeycutt	Cardiak	5:12
8.	"Skeletons" (featuring Joell Ortiz and Crooked I)	Budden; Joell Ortiz; Dominick Wickliffe; Bryan Fryzel	Frequency	4:46
9.	"Ghetto Burbs" (featuring Emanny)	Budden; Saldago; Deleno Matthews; Levar Coppin	Sean C & LV	6:20
10.	"Last Day" (featuring Juicy J and Lloyd Banks)	Budden; K. Stenborg; Jordan Houston; Christopher Lloyd	A6	4:34
11.	"Role Play (Interlude)"		SLV	1:01
12.	"Switch Positions" (featuring Omarion)	Budden; McCormick; Omari Grandberry	Cardiak	4:32
13.	"Tell Him Somethin'" (featuring SLV)	Budden; Saldago; Valley	SLV	6:51
14.	"Runaway"	Budden; Bobby Yewah; Ben Stevenson; Zale Epstein	Beewirks	4:01
15.	"My Time"	Budden	Darknight; 8 Bars	3:46
16.	"No Love Lost (Outro)"	Budden; McCormick; Graham	Cardiak; KdotOnTheBeat (co.)	3:50
17.	"She Don't Put It Down (Remix)" (featuring Fabolous, Twista and Tank)	Budden; Williams; John Jackson; Carl Mitchell; Babbs	T-Minus	4:15
Total length:				71:49

Note

- "Our First Again (Intro)" features uncredited vocals by Wakenna Rosado and Emanny.
- "NBA" features uncredited vocals by Dion Primo.
- "Skeletons" features uncredited vocals by Kaydence.
- "Tell Him Somethin'" features Emanny's vocals as a member of the group SLV.
- "Runaway" features uncredited instrumentation by Maki Athanasiou.

== Personnel ==
Credits for No Love Lost adapted from Allmusic.

- A6 – Producer
- Kirko Bangz – Featured Artist
- Lloyd Banks – Featured Artist
- Boi-1DA – Producer
- Danielle Brimm – A&R, Producer
- Joe Budden – Executive Producer, Primary Artist
- Sean C. – Producer
- Bekah Connolly – A&R
- Crooked I – Featured Artist
- Emanny – Featured Artist, Vocals
- Beewirks – Producer
- Zale Epstein – Composer
- Fabolous – Featured Artist
- French Montana – Featured Artist
- Roger "Mista Raja" Greene – A&R
- Paul Grosso – Creative Director
- Chris Herche – Marketing
- Marcos Hernandez – Recording Engineer
- Halley Hiatt – Assistant
- Zach Isner – Booking
- Billy J. – A&R, Management
- Karon KdotOnTheBeat – Keyboards, Producer
- Andrew Kelley – Package Design
- Kobe – Featured Artist
- Jeremy Kolmin – Guitar
- Stephen Kozmeniuk – Vocal Engineer
- Brendan Laezza – Marketing
- Lil Wayne – Featured Artist
- John McDonald – Producer
- Giovanna Melchiorre – Publicity
- Arnold Mischkulnig – Mastering
- Mizfitz Soundz – Producer
- Victor Morante – Producer
- Corey Newton – Management
- Omarion – Featured Artist
- Joell Ortiz – Featured Artist
- Joe Pesci – Engineer
- Dion Primo – Vocals
- Jennifer Quard – Assistant
- Isaac Romero – Vocal Engineer
- Wakenna Rosado – Vocals
- Royce da 5'9" – Featured Artist
- Emanny Saldago – A&R
- Feras "Ferrari" Sheika – Assistant
- Ben Stevenson – Composer
- Hanif Sumner – Publicity
- Julia Sutowski – Coordinating Producer
- Dontay Thompson – Promoter
- T-Minus – Producer
- Twista – Featured Artist
- Maurice White – Promoter
- Wiz Khalifa – Featured Artist
- LV. – Producer
- Maki Athanasiou – Guitar

== Chart positions ==
=== Weekly charts ===
Chart (2013)	Peak position
US Billboard 200	15
US Top R&B/Hip-Hop Albums (Billboard)	1

=== Year-end charts ===
Chart (2013)	Position
US Top Independent Albums	44
US Top R&B/Hip-Hop Albums	67
