= Andrew Roettger =

American producer

Versatile
- Born: Andrew Roettger
- Origin: New Jersey, United States
- Genres: Hip hop, R&B
- Occupation(s): Record producer, songwriter, remixer
- Years active: 2006–present
- Labels: BMG Publishing, Versatile Music LLC

Andrew Roettger, better known as Versatile, is an American record producer, songwriter, and remixer from New Jersey. Versatile is signed to BMG Publishing and has his own company Versatile Music LLC.

Versatile has produced and remixed for artists like Flo Milli, Chris Brown, Usher, Fabolous, Jay-Z, Maino, Ciara, Britney Spears, Method Man, Redman, Joe Budden, Pittsburgh Slim, Nelly, Nelly Furtado, amongst others.

== Selected discography ==
| Artist(s) | Year | Album | Song(s) | Label | RIAA Certification | Credit |
|---|---|---|---|---|---|---|
| Method Man (feat. Redman) | 2006 | 4:21... The Day After | "Walk On" | Def Jam | - | Producer |
| Omillio Sparks | 2007 | The Payback | "DJ Turn It Up" | Koch | - | Producer |
| Fabolous feat. Jay-Z, Uncle Murda | 2007 | From Nothin' to Somethin' | "Brooklyn" | Def Jam | Certified Gold Album | Producer |
| Fabolous feat. Makeba | 2007 | From Nothin' to Somethin' (iTunes Bonus Track) | "I Shine You Shine" | Def Jam | Certified Gold Album | Producer |
| Joe Budden | 2009 | Padded Room (album) | "Pray For Me" | Amalgam Digital | - | Producer |
| Maino | 2009 | If Tomorrow Comes... | "Runaway Slave" | Atlantic Records | - | Producer |
| Maino | 2009 | If Tomorrow Comes... | "Celebrate" | Atlantic Records | - | Producer |
| Nelly feat. Nelly Furtado | 2013 | M.O. (album) | "Headphones" | Republic Records | - | Co-Writer |
| Flo Milli | 2020 | Ho, Why Is You Here? | "May I" | RCA Records | - | Producer |
