= Escape Route =

Studio album by Joe Budden
- Released: August 11, 2009
- Recorded: 2009
- Genre: Hip hop
- Length: 49:25
- Label: Amalgam Digital; E1
- Producer: Streetrunner; Chad West; J. Cardim; Jared F.; Young McFly; Deli Beats; The Worxxx; Bink!; 9th Wonder

Joe Budden chronology
Padded Room (2009)	Escape Route (2009)	No Love Lost (2013)

Escape Route is the fifth studio album by American hip hop artist Joe Budden. It released in digital format exclusively on Amalgam Digital on August 11, 2009 and physical copies were released on October 6, 2009 through E1 Music. Two bonus tracks were given when the album was purchased online through Amalgam Digital. The record features guest appearances from Slaughterhouse, Young Chris and Wale.

== Commercial performance ==
Upon its release, Escape Route failed to make it onto the Billboard 200. With little promotion, it sold 1,700 copies in its first week. The album debuted at #80 on the Top R&B/Hip-Hop Albums chart and peaked at #47 on its sixth week. It entered at #22 on the Top Rap Albums chart, as well as entering at #39 on the Top Independent Albums chart.

== Critical reception ==
Professional ratings
Review scores
Source	Rating
AllMusic	3.5/5 stars
HipHopDX	3/5 stars
The Koalition	4/5 stars
The Smoking Section	3.5/5 stars

Escape Route received favorable reviews from music critics. AllMusic's David Jeffries gave the three and a half stars out of five, saying "Budden's years stuck in contract negotiation limbo gave him plenty of time to store up material, but his third release of the year is almost as strong as his first triumphs of 2009. Poll the hip-hop faithful for opinions on Escape Route, and Budden himself would be the only one underselling it as a minor release." Rakeem Johnson of The Koalition gave the album a four out of five, saying "Escape Route stands as yet another stellar release in Joe Budden's ever-growing catalogue of quality (his [fourth] release since 2007's Mood Muzik 3). As fluid as this project is, had the album ended with the intense thrill ride that is "Freight Train," it would easily be a five-star release. The addition of the Young Chris-assisted "Connect 4" as well as the Wale-featured bonus "Tito Santana" slows the album's momentum though [Royce da 5'9"] and Budden's chemistry on "For You" is undeniable. [Escape Route] features the misunderstood mind of Joe Budden at his best: personable and honest, defiant yet focused and hungry as he's ever been. Billed as a mere appetizer before The Great Escape, [Escape Route] has a Mood Muzik-feel, Budden's own "release therapy" session and an apt escape route as Joe Budden maps out his way to daylight and his own salvation."

HipHopDX reviewer, Andres Vasquez, gave the album a three out of five, saying "Gaining creativity from the dark clouds, he remains introspective and polished as a writer, demonstrating lyricism that's miles ahead of many in the genre. Acknowledging the fact that this release comes with defects, it seems it wasn't given the attention of an official album. In a press release, Budden noted that Escape Route is merely a precursor to "what may very well be the best Joe Budden album ever." That may or may not prove true but it does sound like this release wasn't a priority. It still delivers the goods for any fan of poetry on wax but the overall sound quality simply isn't up to par, making this nothing more or less than another solid effort." J. Tinsley of The Smoking Section gave the album a 3.5 out of five, saying "Ultimately, Escape Route finds itself as one of Budden's best releases since 2007's Mood Muzik 3. In typical [Joe Budden] fashion, there's the occasional tedious moments as the appeal is his trademark lack of enthusiasm. But with the upcoming album, The Great Escape and Mood Muzik 4 supposedly in the making, his solo career could soon begin to receive the artistic recognition many have been clamoring for years. That is, if he doesn't drive himself crazy beforehand."

== Track listing ==
No.	Title	Producer(s)	Length
1.	"Intro"	The Worxxx	3:29
2.	"Anti"	Young McFly	3:38
3.	"Never Again"	Jared F.	4:36
4.	"World Keeps Spinnin'"	Deli Beats	3:58
5.	"Forgive Me"	Jared F.	4:35
6.	"State of You"	Jared F.	4:59
7.	"Good Enough"	Jared F.	5:22
8.	"No Comment"	J. Cardim	4:03
9.	"We Outta Here" (featuring Royce da 5'9", Joell Ortiz & Crooked I)	Streetrunner	4:42
10.	"Clothes on a Mannequin"	J. Cardim	4:23
11.	"Freight Train"	Jared F.	3:08
12.	"Connect 4" (featuring Young Chris)	Chad West	2:32
Total length:			49:25

Amalgam Digital bonus tracks
No.	Title	Producer(s)	Length
13.	"Tito Santana" (featuring Wale)	9th Wonder	2:18
14.	"For You" (featuring Royce da 5'9")	Bink!	3:17
Total length:			55:01

== Charts ==
Chart (2009–10)	Peak position
U.S. Billboard Top Independent Albums	39
U.S. Billboard Top Rap Albums	22
U.S. Billboard Top R&B/Hip-Hop Albums	47
