= Gangsta Party =

Gangsta Party may refer to:

- Gangsta Party (album), an album by rapper Daz Dillinger
- "Gangsta Party" (2Pac song), an alternate title for the song "2 of Amerikaz Most Wanted"
- "Gangsta Party" (Joe Budden song), 2005 song
- "Gangsta Party" (Yo Gotti song)
