= J. Cardim =

American/Brazilian music producer

- Origin: Rio de Janeiro, Brazil, Cambridge, Massachusetts New York, NY, USA
- Genres: Hip-Hop, R&B
- Occupation: Producer, writer
- Labels: Dice Music Group/ Respect and Power Records

J. Cardim is an American/Brazilian music producer who has lived in Rio de Janeiro, Brazil, Cambridge, Massachusetts, and currently lives in New York City.

J. Cardim has worked with many artists including: Lil Wayne, Akon, Ludacris, The L.O.X., Shawty Lo, Fat Joe, Joe Budden, Avant, Cassidy, Termanology, Gorilla Zoe, Saigon, Wale and Talib Kweli. He has contributed music to EA Sports’ NBA Hoopz video game series, the soundtrack for the film Beauty Shop, and MTV’s Defy the Ordinary commercial campaign. Notable work has been done with Ludacris, Red Café, DJ Envy, Joe Budden, Sheek Louch, French Montana, and Paul Wall on their respective albums, as well as projects by his own Dice Music Group artists Ariez Onasis, TUGE Palermo, G-Eyez, and Certified Gz.

In 2009 J. Cardim contributed production to Dr. Dre’s long-delayed album Detox via a Ludacris penned reference song entitled “OG’s Theme”. J. Cardim also released a mixtape in 2009 entitled Your Favorite Rapper’s Favorite Producer. The album is hosted by DJ Envy, and was released in most major digital music stores including iTunes, Amazon.com, Amalgam Digital, and Rhapsody. The project was well-received, achieving a "Hood" rating from XXL magazine.

In February 2009 J. Cardim won the Loud.com producer competition receiving $15,000 and a 3 song production deal with SRC Records/Universal Motown.

== Production credits ==
=== 2004 ===
==== Jean Grae - This Week ====
- "Intro", "P.S"

==== Termanology - Hood Politics 2 ====
- "A Different World (Ft. Prospect)
- "If I Could Change feat. Twan Hill

=== 2005 ===
==== Talib Kweli - Right About Now ====
- "Where You Gonna Run" (Ft. Jean Grae)

==== Saigon - Abandoned Nation ====
- "Breath Thru the Years"

==== Termanology - Hood Politics 4 ====
- "Thats Life"
- "55 DJ's"
- "U Never Know" (Ft. Lee Wilson)

==== Jean Grae - Soundtrack to Motion Picture Beauty Shop ====
- "Intro"

=== 2006 ===
==== Termanology - Hood Politics 4: Show & Prove ====
- "H.U.S.T.L.E.R"

==== Jean Grae - NBA Hoopz Videogame ====
- "Sprite"

==== AZ - The Format ====
- "Vendetta"
- "This Is What I Do"
- "Rise & Fall" (ft. Little Brother)

=== 2007 ===
==== Jae Millz - Zone Out Season Vol 1 ====
- "Holla At a Playa"
- "The Dopest"
- "No Days Off" (Ft. Al Doe & Vado)

==== Red Cafe & DJ Envy - The Co-Op ====
- "Shakedown for Life"
- "Move Like a G" (Ft. Styles P & Uncle Murda)
- "What It Be Like"

==== Saigon - Moral of the Story ====
- "Ryders" (Ft. Memphis Bleek)

==== French Montana - Live From Africa ====
- "Straight Cash"

==== Royce da 5'9" - Bar Exam ====
- "What You Call That" (Ft. Termanology)

==== Maino - Realest N***a on Earth Mixtape ====
- "Pop Off" (Ft. Red Cafe)

==== Sha Stimuli - MTV's Defy the Ordinary commercial ====
- "Hood"

=== 2008 ===
==== Lil Wayne & Jae Millz - Your Favorite Rapper's, Favorite Producer ====
- "Holla at a Playa (Remix)"

==== Cassidy - 7-7-08 Mixtape ====
- "Money Come Fast"

==== Sheek Louch - Silverback Gorilla ====
- "Rubber Grip" (Ft. Fat Joe & Styles P)

==== Affiliate - Dope Boy For Real - Single ====
- "Dope Boy For Real" (Ft. Sheek Louch & J.Cardim)

==== French Montana - Your Favorite Rapper's, Favorite Producer ====
- "Straight Cash Remix" (Ft. Cassidy, Gorilla Zoe & Max B)

==== Ariez Onassis - Your Favorite Rapper's, Favorite Producer ====
- "Villains" (Ft. Styles P)

==== ASN - Made For This ====
- "Road To Success" (Ft. AZ & ASN)

=== 2009 ===
==== Ghostwridah - Your Favorite Rapper's, Favorite Producer ====
- "Born and Raised" (Ft. Shawty Lo & Paul Wall)

==== J.Cardim - Your Favorite Rapper's, Favorite Producer ====
- "Dont Play Wit My Dough" (Ft. Wale, Red Cafe & MIMS) - Amalgam Digital bonus track

==== Avant - Your Favorite Rapper's, Favorite Producer ====
- "When It Hurts (Remix)" (Ft. Red Cafe) - Bonus

==== Affiliate - Trash Bag Money - Single ====
- "Trash Bag Money" (Ft. Uncle Murda, Sheek Louch & Styles P)

==== Asher Roth - Loud.com exclusive ====
- "I Love College (Remix)"

==== Ariez Onasis - Heartbreak Kid ====
- "You Ain't Ready" (Ft. Pleasure P.)

==== Max B. & French Montana - Coke Wave ====
- "Stake Sauce", "Security", “CT B*tches”, “Long time coming”

==== Joe Budden - Escape Route ====
- "Clothes on a Mannequin", "No Comment"

==== Ludacris - Dice Music Group: The In Crowd ====
- "OG Theme" (Dr. Dre Detox Reference)

==== French Montana - Married to the Streets - Single ====
- "Married to the streets" (Ft. Akon)

==== French Montana - Married to the Streets - Remix ====
- Married to the Streets" (Ft. Mase)

==== Gudda Gudda - Guddaville ====
- "What a Girl" (Ft. Shanell a.k.a. SNL)

=== 2010 ===
==== Joe Budden - Mood Muzik 4: A Turn 4 The Worst ====
- "Come Along"
- "Sober Up" (Ft. Crooked I)
- "Remember the Titans" (Ft. Fabolous, Lloyd Banks, Royce da 5'9")
- "No Idea"
- "Follow My Lead" (Ft. Joell Ortiz)
- "Pray For Them"

==== Joe Budden - Cardim Collection Leaks ====
- "Money's On Me"
- "R.I.P."
- "Keep On"
- "Downfall"
- "Something 2 Ride To"
- ”Spring Training”

==== French Montana - Straight Cash (Remix) - Single ====
- "Straight Cash Remix" (Ft. Gucci Mane)

==== Ariez Onasis - I Came Up - Single ====
- "I Came Up" (Ft. Rock City)

==== J The S - Another Round - Single ====
- "Another Round Remix" (Ft. B.O.B.)

==== Sheek Louch - Donnie G: Don Gorilla ====
- "Ol' Skool" (Ft. Bun B & Jase)

=== 2011 ===
==== TUGE Palermo - Mr. Money Machine (Single) ====
- "Mr. Money Machine"

==== Joe Budden - Mood Muzik 4.5 ====
- "The Hard Part"
- "Spring Training"
- "When It All Implodes"
- "Dreamerz" (Ft. Emmany)

=== 2012 ===
==== Ariez Onasis - The Heartbreak Kid ====
- "The Heartbreak Kid" (album)

=== 2013 ===
==== Louarmstrong ====
- Looks Like She Want It [Fascinated] (feat. French Montana & Nawlage)

==== Canalha ====
- “Tchoppa Pesada”

2026

Paul Wall & Termanology

• “You Believe In You”

=== Albums ===
==== Your Favorite Rapper's Favorite Producer ====
- "Intro" (DJ Envy)
- "Holla At A Playa" (Jae Millz & Lil Wayne)
- "Money Come Fast" (Cassidy)
- "Rubber Grip" (Sheek Louch, Fat Joe & Styles P)
- "Move Like A G" (Red Cafe, Styles P & Uncle Murda)
- "Dope Boy For Real" (Affiliate & Sheek Louch)
- "Just Blaze" (Saigon & Memphis Bleek)
- "Ride Out" (Ransom & French Montana)
- "My Life" (Sha Stimuli & Block McCloud)
- "Straight Cash" (French Montana, Gorilla Zoe, Cassidy & Max B)
- "Star Struck" (TUGE)
- "Born and Raised" (Ghostwridah, Shawty Lo & Paul Wall)
- "Hustle Just To Make Bucks" (Affiliate, G-Eyez & Jae Millz)
- "Follow The Leader" (G-Eyez)
- "Hard Body" (Ed Rock- Certified G'z)
- "The Dopest" (Jae Millz)
- "What You Call That" (Royce Da 5'9 & Termanology)
- "Villain" (Ariez Onasis & Styles P)
- "Hood" (Sha Stimuli)
- "Breathe Thru The Years" (Saigon)
- "Rise and Fall" (AZ & Little Brother)
- "That's Life" (Termanology)

==== The In Crowd ====
- "Move" (Jadakiss, Sheek Louch & Styles P)
- "Connected" (Red Cafe)
- "G Like Me" (G-Eyez, Danny "Skyhigh" McClain, Sha Stimuli & Termanology)
- "G.R.I.T.S." (TUGE Palermo)
- "Juelz Interlude" (Juelz Santana)
- "The City Never Sleeps" (Juelz Santana & Cankoone)
- "On It" (Rock City, Ariez Onasis & Paul Wall)
- "Married To the Streets Remix" (French Montana, Akon & Ma$e)
- "Hood 2" (Sheek Louch, Sha Stimuli & Joe Budden)
- "Straight Jacket" (TUGE Palermo & Ariez Onasis)
- "All Of the Time" (ODB & Ludacris)
- "You Ain't Ready" (Ariez Onasis & Pleasure P)
- "Talk My Shit" (Certified G'z)
- "What You Sayin" (Styles P, Masspike Miles, TUGE Palermo & French Montana)
- "Unstoppable" (Joe Budden, Chief C & Emilio Rojas)
- "How Am I To Live" (G-eyez & Cyrus Deshield)
- "Letter 2 My Enemies" (Brisco, Millyz & Gunplay of Triple C's)
- "What A Girl" (Gudda Gudda & Shanell of Young Money)
- "Butterfly Effect" (Termanology, G-eyez & Emilio Rojas)
- "OG's Theme BONUS" (Ludacris)
