= She Don't Put It Down =

Single by Joe Budden featuring Lil Wayne and Tank

from the album No Love Lost
- Released: October 16, 2012
- Recorded: 2012
- Genre: Hip hop; R&B
- Length: 4:03
- Label: E1; Mood Muzik
- Songwriters: Joseph Budden, Durrell Babbs, Dwayne Carter, Tyler Williams
- Producer: T-Minus

Joe Budden singles chronology
| "Gangsta Party" (2005) | "She Don't Put It Down" (2012) | "NBA" (2013) |

Lil Wayne singles chronology
| "Ball" (2012) | "She Don't Put It Down" (2012) | "Hello" (2012) |

Tank singles chronology
| "Emergency" (2010) | "She Don't Put It Down" (2012) | "High" (2013) |

"She Don't Put It Down" is a song by American hip hop recording artist Joe Budden. It was released on October 16, 2012, as the first single from his sixth studio album No Love Lost (2013). The song, produced by T-Minus, features guest appearances from Lil Wayne and R&B singer Tank; the music video version contains an additional guest appearance from Fabolous, while the official remix features both the latter and Twista. It became Budden's first song to enter the Billboard Hot 100 since his 2003 hit "Pump It Up", though it only peaked at number 96.

== Music video ==
On February 5, 2013, the music video for the song along with the remix featuring Fabolous, Lil Wayne and Tank premiered on 106 & Park. Twista does not appear in the video.

== Remix ==
The official remix was released for digital download on January 18, 2013, featuring Fabolous, Twista and Tank.

== Track listing ==
Digital single

| No. | Title | Writer(s) | Producer(s) | Length |
|---|---|---|---|---|
| 1. | "She Don't Put It Down" (featuring Lil Wayne and Tank) | Joseph Budden; Durrell Babbs; Dwayne Carter; Tyler Williams | T-Minus | 4:03 |

== Charts ==
| Chart (2012–2013) | Peak position |
|---|---|
| US Billboard Hot 100 | 96 |
| US Billboard Hot R&B/Hip-Hop Songs | 32 |

== Release history ==
| Country | Date | Format | Label |
|---|---|---|---|
| United States | October 16, 2012 | Digital download | E1, Mood Muzik Entertainment |
