= Padded Room (album) =

Studio album by Joe Budden
- Released: February 24, 2009
- Recorded: 2007–08; Bennett Studios (Englewood, New Jersey); Glenwood Place Studios (Burbank, California); Sundance Studios (Jersey City, New Jersey)
- Genre: Hip hop
- Length: 55:49
- Label: Amalgam Digital
- Producers: The Klasix; Blastah Beatz; Dub B; Versatile; Dilemma; MoSS; Fyu-Chur; Qwan

Joe Budden chronology
Halfway House (2008)	Padded Room (2009)	Escape Route (2009)

Singles from Padded Room
- 1. "The Future" Released: December 30, 2008

Padded Room is the fourth studio album by Joe Budden, released February 24, 2009. Recording for the album took place from 2007 to 2008; at Bennett Studios in Englewood, New Jersey, Glenwood Place Studios in Burbank, California and Sundance Studios in Jersey City, New Jersey, and it was mixed and mastered at Cyber Sound Studio in New York City. The record features guest appearances from Emanny, Drew Hudson and The Game. The album's release was supported by the single "The Future" featuring The Game, and two promotional singles – "In My Sleep" and "Exxxes".

Padded Room debuted at #42 on the US Billboard 200 chart and #2 on the Top Independent Albums chart, with 13,451 copies sold in the first week of release. Many people in the entertainment industry had high expectations for Padded Room. Upon its release, the album received generally favorable reviews from music critics. The New York Times gave the rap album a favorable review, and IGN gave it 8.2/10. It was widely promoted, but its success was less than moderate.

== Background ==
At the time, while he was still signed to Def Jam, Joe Budden intended to release a second album, titled The Growth. However, it was scuttled by a deteriorating relationship with the record label, and a rumored feud with Jay-Z (who became the president and CEO of the record label in 2004). Joe Budden commented on his disagreements with his former label, saying, "The relationship went sour over the years, not something that just happened spontaneously or instantly. It was kind of a developing process." Yet, he did acknowledge that Def Jam's changing of the guard in 2004, after his debut's release, was not good for his career. He explained that the people that signed him to the record label and had faith and belief in him were no longer in charge. If the people who currently run Def Jam were in charge in 2002-2003, he doubts that he ever would have been signed to a deal.

In January 2008, in an interview with Billboard.com, the New York/New Jersey rapper said that the album would be "in the same vein as Mood Muzik, just a little more structure and the mood will probably be a little lighter." Once Padded Room was released, Joe Budden hoped there wouldn't be another long wait before his third studio album. "I'm in the studio every single day, vibing and coming up with ideas," he said. "There's always music around to put out, so you'll hear more from me sooner than later, I hope."

Due to complications with the physical product, it was pushed back from October 28, 2008 to February 24, 2009. Joe Budden and Amalgam Digital decided to release Halfway House, a digital-only album featuring fourteen brand new songs, on October 28 as a prequel to the album. Halfway House is the first digital-only hip hop release employing both traditional marketing methods (commercial radio, video, advertising campaigns, etc.) and new media viral marketing initiatives. Joe Budden apologized to his fans, saying, "Though I'm not happy about it being pushed so far back, I do understand the method behind the madness. We've got an album that I'm extremely proud of and a lead single that Amalgam Digital and I are both very happy with, but for those of you who are just as anxious as I am, I apologize."

== Recording and production ==
Padded Room was recorded from 2007 and 2008 at Bennett Studios in Englewood, New Jersey, Glenwood Place Studios in Burbank, California, and Sundance Studios in Jersey City, New Jersey. The album's production was handled by Blastah Beatz, Fyu-chur, MoSS, Dub B, Versatile, Qwan, Dilemma and The Klasix. The album was mixed and mastered at Cyber Sound Studio in New York City by Jeremy Page.

In January 2008, Joe Budden told Billboard.com that Padded Room is completed. "It basically will be in the same vein as 'Mood Muzik,' just a little more structure and the mood will probably be a little lighter. I'm definitely pleased with the direction that it's going." He added that the album "sounds like Joe Budden. I can't really say it sounds like the times, because the times right now I'm not too fond of. I'm not too big on how that sound is going. But Joe Budden fans will get what they're accustomed to, and there's music on there for the casual listener as opposed to 'Mood Muzik,' which is not for the casual fan."

Amalgam partnered with Ustream to broadcast Joe Budden's studio session live on August 21, 2008. The fans had the opportunity to chat with the rapper before watching him live in studio as he puts the finishing touches on his album. In the studio session he finished "Exxxes" and "Happy Holidays".

== Singles ==
The lead single, "The Future" featuring The Game, was released on December 30, 2008. On February 16, 2009, "In My Sleep," was leaked onto the Internet as a promotional single. Its music video, directed by Rik Cordero, was released on March 14, 2009. Joe Budden filmed a music video for the song "Exxxes," for which the behind the scenes footage was released on March 9, 2009. On April 14, 2009, the music video was released.

== Critical reception ==
Professional ratings
Aggregate scores
Source	Rating
Metacritic	70/100
Review scores
Source	Rating
About.com	3.5/5 stars
DJBooth	4/5 stars
Okayplayer	84/100
HipHopDX	3.5/5 stars
IGN	8.2/10
The New York Times	favorable
PopMatters	7/10 medals
Prefix Magazine	7/10
RapReviews	7.5/10
XXL	4/5 (XL)

Padded Room opened up to generally favorable reviews from music critics. At Metacritic, which assigns a normalized rating out of 100 to reviews from mainstream critics, the album has received an average score of 70, based on 5 reviews. Jesal 'Jay Soul' Padania of RapReviews gave the album a 7.5 out of ten, saying "Therefore, whoever had the final say-so on the beat selection is the main culprit for the failings on the album - if it was Joe Budden himself, then more shame him, because he also turns in a superb lyrical performance that rap fans will appreciate as one of the most interesting efforts in recent hip hop history." Evan Rytlewski of Prefix Magazine gave the album a seven out of ten, saying "On his 2003 debut, he was arrogant and scattered, too often losing his train of thought and reaching for throwaway puns. The Joe Budden on Padded Room, however, is focused and hungry, spinning dense, psychological yarns that build for dozens and dozens of bars. Budden scratched and clawed for his second chance, and he hasn't squandered it."

PopMatters's Andrew Martin gave the album a seven out of ten, saying "Padded Room is still a solid, well-crafted effort. Budden has not slouched at all in his six years 'out' of the game, though that's clearly not accurate as his mixtapes have more than filled any possible void. But there is still plenty for him to accomplish if he wants to have a classic under his belt. And if his shit-talking and online presence is any indication, he will likely not settle until he has a classic album of his very own." Jon Caramanica of The New York Times noted "while Joe Budden is enamored of his rhymes, which are taut, intricate and structurally varied, he raps in a scraped-up monotone, a technician first and stylist second." Ivan Rott of About.com gave the album three and a half stars out of five, saying "For so long, Joe Budden has been deemed the ultimate mixtape rapper, but with Padded Room, perhaps he can begin to commence the discography and career he and his fans have sought after for so long. Independent hip-hop and it's a thing to celebrate. And support." Andres Vasquez of HipHopDX gave the album a 3.5 out of five, saying "Joe Budden has released a candid and thought provoking piece of work. It's something that many fans have been waiting for. Even with miscues on board, it's still the album mainstream rappers attempt to make on paper, and the kind of writing that many independents can't seem to keep up with."

IGN reviewer, Alfred H. Leonard, III, gave the album an 8.2 out of ten, stating "Joe's talent is undeniable as he effortlessly paints vivid pictures of his life and allows his audience to see a real person rather than a faux rap persona." Jason Reynolds of Okayplayer gave the album 84 out of a 100, saying "Like most of Joe Budden's work, Padded Room, is sad. But it's good. Which makes me happy. Maybe that's Joe Budden's appeal. Maybe he shows us our humanness, our misery, and the resilience it takes to grow. Or that insanity might be normal, and that we all are in need of a padded room. Either way, this Padded Room is worth a visit." DJBooth reviewer, Nathan S., gave the album four "spins" out of five, saying "In the end, if Budden belongs in a padded room it's because he's self-destructively focused on making music that matters, and if that's crazy, I don't want to be sane." Damien Scoot of XXL gave the album an "XL", saying "Lyrically, Joe crafts a masterpiece, opening the door to the mind of a disturbed yet misunderstood soul. Sadly, the album's beat selections, at times, don't match. There are no throwaways to speak of, but tracks like the '80s-rock-inspired 'Don't Make Me' and the retro pop 'My Life' just aren't as innovative as the lyrics atop them. Whatever the case, Padded Room proves that, when it comes to heartfelt hip-hop, it's good to be crazy."

== Track listing ==
No.	Title	Producer(s)	Length
1.	"Now I Lay"	Blastah Beatz	3:23
2.	"The Future" (featuring The Game)	Fyu-Chur	3:46
3.	"If I Gotta Go" (featuring Emanny)	The Klasix	5:40
4.	"Don't Make Me"	Blastah Beatz	3:30
5.	"Blood on the Wall"	MoSS	4:00
6.	"In My Sleep"	The Klasix	4:19
7.	"Exxxes"	The Klasix	6:05
8.	"I Couldn't Help It" (featuring Emanny)	The Klasix	6:05
9.	"Adrenaline" (featuring Drew Hudson)	Dub B	4:42
10.	"Happy Holidays" (featuring Emanny)	Qwan	3:56
11.	"Do Tell"	Blastah Beatz	3:50
12.	"Angel in My Life"	Blastah Beatz	3:32
13.	"Pray for Me"	Versatile; Dilemma	5:01
Total length:			55:49

Amalgam Digital bonus tracks
No.	Title	Producer(s)	Length
14.	"Family Reunion (Remix)" (featuring Fabolous, Ransom and Hitchcock)	Cousin Cole	5:50
15.	"All of Me (Reprise)" (featuring Emanny)	The Klasix	8:27
Total length:			64:29

== Chart positions ==
Chart	Provider	Peak position
US Billboard 200	Billboard	42
US Top Digital Albums	Billboard	12
US Top Independent Albums	Billboard	2
US Top Rap Albums	Billboard	6
US Top R&B/Hip-Hop Albums	Billboard	21

== Personnel ==
Credits for Padded Room adapted from Allmusic and from the album liner notes.

- Joe Budden – primary artist, composer, rap vocals
- Dominic – featured artist
- Blastah Beatz – production
- Dilemma – production
- Dub B – production
- Andrew "Fyu-chur" Jackson – production
- The Klasix – production
- MoSS – production
- Al Perrota – audio engineer
- Qwan – production
- Emanny "Emanny" Salgado – featured artist
- Jayceon "The Game" Taylor – featured artist
- Versatile – production

Additional personnel

- Crystal Isaacs – management
- Jeremy Page – mastering, mixing
- Alexander Richter – photography
- Skrilla – art direction, design
