= Mood Muzik 3: The Album =

Studio album by Joe Budden
- Released: February 26, 2008
- Genre: Hip-hop
- Length: 77:46
- Label: Amalgam Digital
- Producer: Mr. Freeman; The Klasix; WMS Sultan; Dub B; Mellow Madness; Ryan Lugo; Shatek; Soulsearchin'; Omen

Joe Budden chronology
Joe Budden (2003)	Mood Muzik 3: The Album (2008)	Halfway House (2008)

Professional ratings
Review scores
Source	Rating
PopMatters	5/10 stars
RapReviews	(8.5/10)

Mood Muzik 3: The Album is the second album by the American rapper Joe Budden, released on February 26, 2008, under Amalgam Digital. It is the retail version of Mood Muzik 3: For Better or for Worse. This album marked Budden's first album in five years following label drama with Def Jam and the shelving of his album The Growth.

Mood Muzik 3: The Album peaked at number 88 on the Billboard Top R&B/Hip-Hop Albums chart. The album sold 1,100 copies in its first week.

== Track listing ==
No.	Title	Producer(s)	Length
1.	"Dear Diary"	WMS Sultan	5:08
2.	"Hiatus"	Mellow Madness	5:41
3.	"Family Reunion" (featuring Ransom, Fabolous and Hitchcock)	Shatek	6:50
4.	"Get No Younger" (featuring Ezo)	The Klasix	3:30
5.	"Un4Given"	Ryan Lugo	5:21
6.	"All of Me" (featuring Emanny)	The Klasix	7:56
7.	"Long Way to Go" (featuring Mr. Probz)	Soulsearchin'	4:36
8.	"Thou Shall Not Fall"	The Klasix	4:29
9.	"Ventilation"	The Klasix	3:50
10.	"Warfare" (featuring Joell Ortiz)	The Klasix	2:56
11.	"Roll Call"	WMS Sultan	4:07
12.	"Secrets" (featuring Emanny)	The Klasix	5:53
13.	"Send Him Our Love"	The Klasix	4:15
14.	"Star Inside of Me" (featuring Suzy Q)	Dub B	3:54
15.	"Still My Hood"	Omen	4:39
16.	"4 Walls"	The Klasix	4:41
Total length:			77:46

Sample credits

- "4 Walls" contains a sample of "Four Walls" as performed by Eddie Holman.
- "Un4Given" heavily samples "Unforgiven" as performed by Metallica.
- "Thou Shall Not Fall" heavily samples "Cry Little Sister" as performed by Gerard McMahon.

== Charts ==
Chart (2008)	Peak position
US Top R&B/Hip-Hop Albums (Billboard)	88
