= Last Words (Ai song) =

Single by Ai

from the album Original Ai
- Language: Japanese; English
- B-side: "Last Words (featuring Joe Budden)"
- Released: January 29, 2003
- Recorded: 2002
- Studio: Michael "Lofey" Sandlofer's home studio (New York City, New York)
- Genre: R&B; hip-hop
- Length: 3:23 (Solo version); 4:24 (Joe Budden version)
- Label: Def Jam Japan
- Songwriter: Ai Uemura
- Producers: Desert Storm; Lofey; Skane

Ai singles chronology
"Luv Ya" (2002)	"Last Words" (2003)	"Uh Uh......" (2003)

Joe Budden singles chronology
"Focus" (2002)	"Last Words" (2003)	"Pump It Up" (2003)

Music video
- "Last Words (Solo version)" on YouTube

"Last Words" (最終宣告, Saishū Senkoku) is a song written and recorded by Japanese-American singer-songwriter Ai. It was released on January 29, 2003, as her first single under Def Jam Japan. The song served as the lead single for her second studio album, Original Ai.

Upon its release, "Last Words" was a commercial success, scoring Ai her first top 30 single on the Oricon Japan Singles chart. It is her 8th best selling single on Oricon.

== Background ==
After the release of her debut studio album under BMG, My Name Is Ai, Ai left the label due to the commercial failure of the album and its singles. In 2002, she signed to Universal Music Japan sublabel Def Jam Japan, becoming the first woman signed to the label. In an interview, Ai stated she felt more at home with Def Jam, as many of her co-workers shared her musical tastes.

In an interview with Barks Japan regarding the English version featuring Joe Budden, Ai said she was "happy to work with Joe" as she and Budden both were new to the Def Jam label.

== Music video ==
A music video for the solo version of "Last Words" was released in 2003. Various scenes show Ai performing on a stage, a dressing room and her watching the video on a CRT TV.

Ai re-released the music video to YouTube on her official channel on January 27, 2021 in part of her twentieth anniversary in the music industry as it previously was not on the service.

== Live performances ==
A live performance of the song was included on Ai's 2007 live album, Live Ai.

== Charts ==
"Last Words" peaked at number 29 on the Oricon Singles chart, which became Ai's best performing single on the chart at the time until the release of her 2005 single, "365", which peaked at number 20. The single was Budden's first appearance on the chart.

Chart (2005)	Peak position
Japan Singles Chart (Oricon)	29

== Track listing ==
All tracks produced by Desert Storm, Lofey and Skane.

"Last Words" – Maxi single
No.	Title	Writer(s)	Length
1.	"Last Words"	Ai Uemura	3:23
2.	"Last Words" (featuring Joe Budden)	Uemura; Joseph Budden	4:24
3.	"Last Words" (Instrumental)		3:23
4.	"Last Words" (Instrumental featuring Joe Budden)		4:24

=== Notes ===
- Tracks 1 and 3 are titled in Japanese
