= 2 Fast 2 Furious (soundtrack) =

2003 film soundtrack

Soundtrack album by Various Artists
- Released: May 27, 2003
- Recorded: 2002–03
- Genres: Hip hop; R&B
- Length: 60:53
- Labels: Def Jam South; Disturbing Tha Peace; UMG Soundtracks
- Producers: Chaka Zulu (exec.); John Singleton (exec.); Neal H. Moritz (exec.); Jeff Dixon (co-exec.); Ludacris (co-exec.); Tina M. Davis (co-exec.); Anthony Sears; Bangladesh; Big Du; Carlos Hernandez; Cool & Dre; DirtBag; Diaz Brothers; Elite; Just Blaze; Keith McMasters; R. Kelly; stic.man; The Trak Starz

Singles from 2 Fast 2 Furious (soundtrack)
- 1. "Pump It Up" Released: May 8, 2003; 2. "Act a Fool" Released: May 20, 2003; 3. "Pick Up the Phone" Released: 2003; 4. "Hell Yeah" Released: March 30, 2004

2 Fast 2 Furious is the soundtrack for John Singleton's 2003 action film 2 Fast 2 Furious. It was released on May 27, 2003, via Def Jam South. Production was handled by several record producers, including Keith McMasters, Cool & Dre, the Diaz Brothers, Elite, Just Blaze and The Trak Starz. It features contributions from the film stars Ludacris and MC Jin, as well as 2 Chainz, 8Ball, Chingy, Dead Prez, Dirtbag, Fat Joe, I-20, Joe Budden, Kardinal Offishall, K'Jon, Lil' Flip, Pitbull, R. Kelly, Shawnna, Trick Daddy and Tyrese Gibson.

The album reached number five on the Billboard 200, and peaked atop the Billboard Top Soundtracks and Top R&B/Hip-Hop Albums charts, spawning four singles: "Pump It Up", "Act a Fool", "Pick Up the Phone" and "Hell Yeah". As of August 14, 2003, It was certified Gold by the Recording Industry Association of America for selling of 500,000 copies in the United States.

== Critical reception ==
Professional ratings
Review scores
Source	Rating
AllMusic	2.5/5 stars
RapReviews	8/10

AllMusic editor John Bush highlighted Budden's "Pump It Up", Trick's "Represent" and Ludacris' "Act a Fool" as standout tracks but found Tyrese's offering "weaker [even] than his solo work for J Records". Steve 'Flash' Juon of RapReviews.com gave praise to the overall Dirty South production throughout the first two-thirds of the album, highlighting Budden and Dead Prez's contributions for standing out amongst them, but was mixed on the final third having unknown artists on the last three tracks, concluding that: "Given that's a known fact about rap soundtracks, it's ironic that by using a somewhat less diverse mix 2 Fast 2 Furious actually achieves and in some ways ECLIPSES the success of its predecessor. Whether the movie can do the same without Vin Diesel is up to the audience of moviegoers, but hip-hop and Dirty South fans alike should be happy with the soundtrack".

== Track listing ==
No.	Title	Writer(s)	Producer(s)	Length
1.	"Start (Intro)" (performed by Ludacris)			0:09
2.	"Act a Fool" (performed by Ludacris)	Christopher Bridges; Keith McMasters	Keith McMasters	4:30
3.	"Represent" (performed by Trick Daddy)	Maurice Young; Carlos Hernandez	Carlos Hernandez	3:38
4.	"Slum" (performed by I-20 featuring Shawnna and Tity Boi)	Bobby Sandimanie; Rashawnna Guy; Tauheed Epps; Shondrae Crawford	Bangladesh	3:06
5.	"Pick Up the Phone" (performed by Tyrese and Ludacris featuring R. Kelly)	Bridges; Robert Kelly	R. Kelly	4:53
6.	"Hands in the Air" (performed by 8Ball)	Premro Smith; Dewayne Martin; Jason Boyd	Big Du	4:12
7.	"Gettin' It" (performed by Chingy)	Howard Bailey; Alonzo E. Lee Jr.; Shamar Daugherty	The Trak Starz	4:19
8.	"Block Reincarnated-(Remix)- Album Version (Edited)" (performed by Shawnna featuring Kardinal Offishall)	Guy; Jason Harrow; McMasters	Keith McMasters	3:59
9.	"Pump It Up" (performed by Joe Budden)	Joe Budden; Justin Smith; Claydes Smith; Dennis Ronald Thomas; George Brown; Richard Westfield; Robert Bell; Robert Spike Mickens; Ronald Bell	Just Blaze	4:11
10.	"Peel Off" (performed by Jin)	Jin Auyeng; Anthony Parrino	Elite	4:09
11.	"We Ridin'" (performed by Fat Joe)	Joseph Cartagena; Andre Lyon; Marcello Valenzano	Cool & Dre	3:01
12.	"Rollin on 20's" (performed by Lil' Flip)	Wesley Eric Weston; Anthony Sears; Chris Gallien	Anthony Sears	4:09
13.	"Fuck What a Nigga Say..." (performed by Dirtbag)	Jermany James; Lyon; Valenzano	Cool & Dre	3:16
14.	"Oye" (performed by Pitbull)	Armando Perez; Hugo Diaz; Luis Diaz; Steven Trujillo	The Diaz Brothers	4:02
15.	"Miami" (performed by K'Jon)	Kelvin Johnson; McMasters	Keith McMasters	4:18
16.	"Finish" (performed by Ludacris)			0:10
Total length:				1:00:53

German bonus tracks
No.	Title	Performer(s)	Length
17.	"Remember"	Cronite	4:26
18.	"Get Dirty"	DJ Desue featuring A.G. and Party Arty	2:53

Japanese bonus tracks
No.	Title	Performer(s)	Length
19.	"Cruisin'"	Sphere of Influence	4:39

Notes

- Tracks 1 and 17 are voice clips taken from the film performed by Ludacris.
- Tracks 4, 7, 10, 12 are not featured in the film.

== Bonus tracks ==
On June 23, 2003, an alternate version of the album was released with two additional bonus tracks, "Remember" and "Get Dirty". On October 21, 2003, a further version was released with a single bonus song, "Comin' Up" by Saukrates.

== Charts ==
=== Weekly charts ===
Chart (2003)	Peak position
Austrian Albums (Ö3 Austria)	22
Belgian Albums (Ultratop Wallonia)	50
Canadian Albums (Billboard)	11
French Albums (SNEP)	57
German Albums (Offizielle Top 100)	11
New Zealand Albums (RMNZ)	18
Swiss Albums (Schweizer Hitparade)	26
US Billboard 200	5
US Top R&B/Hip-Hop Albums (Billboard)	1
US Soundtracks Albums (Billboard)	1

=== Year-end charts ===
Chart (2003)	Position
German Albums (Offizielle Top 100)	76
US Billboard 200	98
US Top R&B/Hip-Hop Albums (Billboard)	63
US Soundtrack Albums (Billboard)	6

== Certifications ==
Region	Certification	Certified units/sales
Canada (Music Canada)	Gold	50,000^{^}
United States (RIAA)	Gold	500,000^{^}
^{^} Shipments figures based on certification alone.
