= Rage & The Machine =

Studio album by Joe Budden
- Released: October 21, 2016
- Recorded: 2016
- Studio: 934 Studios (Totowa, NJ)
- Genre: Hip-hop
- Length: 41:41
- Labels: Mood Muzik; Empire
- Producer: araabMUZIK

Joe Budden chronology
All Love Lost (2015)	Rage & The Machine (2016)

Singles from Rage & The Machine
- 1. "Flex" Released: July 1, 2016

Professional ratings
Review scores
Source	Rating
AllMusic	3/5 stars
HipHopDX	4.1/5
Pitchfork	6/10

Rage & The Machine is the eighth and final solo studio album by American rapper Joe Budden. It was released on October 21, 2016, via Mood Muzik Entertainment and Empire Distribution. Recording sessions took place at 934 Studios in Totowa. Production was handled entirely by AraabMuzik, with Illmind co-produced two tracks, and Brady Watt and Parks provided additional instrumentation. It features guest appearances from Emanny, Fabolous, Jazzy, Joell Ortiz, Stacy Barthe and Tory Lanez.

The album debuted at number 40 on the Billboard 200, number-one on both the Top R&B/Hip-Hop Albums and Independent Albums charts with first-week sales of 11,341 copies in the United States.

== History ==
On the hype of his feud with Drake and Meek Mill, Joe Budden previewed Rage & The Machine with a lead single "Flex", which was released on July 1, 2016. In mid-September 2016, he revealed the cover art, tracklisting and album's released date set for October 21, 2016. Accompanying music videos were directed for "Flex" and "By Law". In an interview with Billboard, producer AraabMuzik described the creation of the album, saying:

"It all started with a phone from Joe breaking the album down, telling me his ideas and letting me know what he wanted. I went up to New Jersey and started playing him some tracks he may have wanted for the album. I traveled back home and to his house and he was recording a lot for a couple months. We linked around April 2016 and worked until September and the project released October 2016. [Joe Budden] gave me the Tevin Campbell sample to flip on "Idols" and everything else I did on my own. That was a handpicked sample. It was definitely a good project, but then again".

In 2018, following up the disbandment of Slaughterhouse, Joe Budden announced his retirement from rapping to focus entirely on his infotainment career for The Joe Budden Podcast.

== Track listing ==
No.	Title	Producer(s)	Length
1.	"Three"	araabMUZIK; !llmind (co.)	4:28
2.	"Uncle Joe"	araabMUZIK	3:05
3.	"Serious" (featuring Joell Ortiz)	araabMUZIK	2:38
4.	"By Law" (featuring Jazzy)	araabMUZIK	3:55
5.	"Flex" (featuring Tory Lanez and Fabolous)	araabMUZIK; Brady Watt (add.)	4:11
6.	"Forget"	araabMUZIK	1:31
7.	"I Gotta Ask"	araabMUZIK; !llmind (co.)	2:55
8.	"Time for Work" (featuring Emanny)	araabMUZIK; Parks Vallely (add.)	3:25
9.	"Wrong One"	araabMUZIK	3:28
10.	"I Wanna Know" (featuring Stacy Barthe)	araabMUZIK	5:54
11.	"Idols"	araabMUZIK	6:11
Total length:			41:41

== Personnel ==
- Joe Budden – vocals, executive producer
- Joell Ortiz – vocals (track 3)
- Yasmin "Jazzy" Ledesma – vocals (track 4)
- Daystar "Tory Lanez" Peterson – vocals (track 5)
- John "Fabolous" Jackson – vocals (track 5)
- Emanny Salgado – vocals (track 8)
- Stacy Barthe – vocals (track 10)
- Abraham "AraabMuzik" Orellana – producer
- Ramon "Illmind" Ibanga Jr. – co-producer (tracks: 1, 7)
- Brady Watt – additional producer (track 5)
- Richard Parks Vallely – additional producer (track 8), recording, mixing, executive producer
- Pat Rosario – recording (track 3)
- Ian Schwartzman – executive producer
- Cheng Chum – design, layout
- Alee Rose – photography

== Charts ==
Chart (2016)	Peak position
UK R&B Albums (Official Charts)	20
US Billboard 200	40
US Independent Albums (Billboard)	1
US Top R&B/Hip-Hop Albums (Billboard)	1

== See also ==
- List of Billboard number-one R&B/hip-hop albums of 2016
