= A Loose Quarter =

Mixtape by Joe Budden
- Released: November 20, 2012
- Recorded: 2012
- Genre: Hip hop
- Length: 65:38
- Label: Mood Muzik Entertainment
- Producers: AraabMuzik; DJ Pain 1; SLV; Darknight; 8 Bars; Beewirks; Blessed by the Beats; S. Jones; Studio Magic; Cardiak; Doe Pesci

Joe Budden chronology
Mood Muzik 4: A Turn 4 The Worst (2010)	A Loose Quarter (2012)	Some Love Lost (2014)

A Loose Quarter is the fifth mixtape by American rapper Joe Budden, it was released on November 20, 2012. The mixtape features guest appearances from Ab-Soul, Tsu Surf, Mal, Emanny, Trev Rich, Royce Da 5'9" and Kobe.

== Critical response ==
Professional ratings
Review scores
Source	Rating
AllHipHop	8/10
BET	4/5 stars

A Loose Quarter was met with generally favorable reviews from music critics. David "Rek" Lee of HipHopDX gave the mixtape a positive review, saying "Joe Budden plays his part on the Slaughterhouse album, but A Loose Quarter allows him to really flex his artistry. That's a great thing or just a cool thing depending on how much of a fan you are. But the kind of honesty and open soul-searching shouldn't be taken for granted, especially in a genre that doesn't usually celebrate growth past the obligatory conscious record."

King Eljay of AllHipHop gave the mixtape an eight out of ten, saying "As far as emotional appeal, that’s here in spades as well. From the emotional dealings of “Momma Said”, to “Off 2 The Races”, which deals with the lack of closure from his ex, Tahiry (she loved it, by the way), Joe has always had a painfully honest way of dealing with his situations. The interesting twist here is alluded to above; it's not all negative as one would lead you to think, thanks to his current girl, Kaylin. He even touches on her personal situation for a couple of songs (notably on “More Of Me“), but although it's nice to know the story behind it all, it doesn't seem to quite fit as well as other featured songs here. Thankfully, he gets back into the pocket with Royce Da 5’9 and Kobe, as “All In My Head” is arguably the best track here."

== Commercial performance ==
A Loose Quarter sold 29,000 copies in its first week. It has sold 87,000 copies as of September 2016.

== Track listing ==
No.	Title	Producer(s)	Length
1.	"Intro"	SLV	3:10
2.	"Words of a Chameleon"	AraabMuzik	1:52
3.	"What Y'all Want"	Darknight, 8 Bars	4:47
4.	"Cut From a Different Cloth" (featuring Ab-Soul)	Cardiak	4:06
5.	"Through My Eyes" (featuring Tsu Surf)	AraabMuzik	4:23
6.	"Momma Said"	Beewirks	4:01
7.	"Off 2 the Races"	Blessed By The Beats	5:06
8.	"The Helmet (Interlude)" (featuring Mal and Emanny)	SLV	2:05
9.	"So Good" (featuring Emanny)	AraabMuzik	5:18
10.	"So Hard" (featuring Emanny)	Studiomagic	5:08
11.	"Dreams (Interlude)" (featuring Trev Rich)	S. Jones	3:31
12.	"Pain Won't Stop"	DJ Pain One	4:59
13.	"All In My Head" (featuring Royce Da 5'9" and Kobe)	Cardiak	5:12
14.	"More of Me" (featuring Emanny)	Cardiak	7:00
15.	"Now or Never" (featuring Emanny)	Doe Pesci	5:00
