= The Joe Budden Podcast =

Music podcast

- Genre: Talk; Music
- Language: English

Cast and voices
- Hosted by: Joe Budden; Parks Vallely; Lamar "Ice" Burney; Antwan "Ish" Marby; Trevor "Queenzflip" Robinson; Marc Lamont Hill; Damona Love

Production
- Length: 75–180 minutes

Publication
- Original release: February 18, 2015
- Provider: Joe Budden Network
- Updates: Semiweekly

Related
- Website: The Joe Budden Podcast at the Wayback Machine (archived March 7, 2022)

The Joe Budden Podcast (formerly I'll Name This Podcast Later) is an American talk and music podcast hosted by former rapper and media personality, Joe Budden, along with the show's producer and engineer, Parks Vallely, and co-hosts Lamar "Ice" Burney, Antwan "Ish" Marby, Trevor "Queenzflip" Robinson, Marc Lamont Hill, and Damona "Don't Call Me White Girl" Love. The podcast is released semiweekly, and is produced and based in New Jersey.

The show covers numerous topics within mainstream media and pop culture, ranging from music, politics to sports, but primarily focuses on hip-hop/R&B and recent events centered in African-American culture from the previous week.

== History ==
The show began in early 2015 as I'll Name This Podcast Later, originally hosted by former rapper Joe Budden, Rory Farrell and Marisa Mendez. The content of the podcast was described as "life, music, sex, and more". The first episode was released audio only on February 18, 2015, at a runtime of 1 hour. For the first year of its existence, the show followed this format, releasing episodes at an average run time of 60–75 mins and audio only.

After episode 76 in July 2016, Mendez left the show, siding with Drake during his real life feud with Budden, and was subsequently replaced with Jamil "Mal" Clay for episode 77.

With the release of episode 92 on December 14, 2016, the show switched to a new video format set in Budden's home studio. Shortly after this, the show's run time switched from an average of 60–70 mins to 90–120 mins, which varied from week to week. After the studio began undergoing renovations, the location for filming was moved to the living room of audio engineer Parks Vallely for episode 126 in August 2017. The move to Vallely's house marked his first appearances on the show; he would go on to become a formal host of podcast.

In August 2018, Budden signed a deal to bring his podcast to Spotify while still uploading a video version to YouTube, and expand the show to a twice-weekly schedule, with new episodes every Wednesday and Saturday. In September 2020, the exclusive contract with Spotify came to an end after failed negotiations between the show and the digital streaming provider.

In October 2020, Budden revealed that the podcast would be part of his new online media network, The Joe Budden Network. In addition, he announced that the show had signed a new deal to be sponsored by Cash App. The first podcast launched on The Joe Budden Network was the See The Thing Is... podcast hosted by Bridget Kelly, Olivia Dope and Mandii B in October 2020. Since November 2020, the network and the podcast itself are being distributed by multiple platforms, primarily YouTube, SoundCloud, iTunes and Google Podcasts. In January 2021, Karen Civil and Ming Lee joined the network, launching the Girl I Guess podcast.

In May 2021, Rory and Mal both left the podcast after 5 years as co-hosts, in the wake of Rory being fired by Budden.

Later in May 2021, two of Budden's long-time friends, Antwan "Ish" Marby and Lamar "Ice" Burney joined the podcast as co-hosts. In December 2022, media personality and former video vixen Melyssa Ford and social media entertainer Trevor "Queenzflip" Robinson also joined the podcast as co-hosts. In September 2025, Ford left the podcast after 3 years as a co-host.

In 2024, academic, author, activist, and television personality Marc Lamont Hill joined the podcast as a co-host. In September 2025, following a few recurring guest appearances in the past and earlier in the year, social media personality and comedian, Damona Love (professionally known as "Don't Call me White Girl") joined the podcast as a co-host.

== Hosts ==
=== Current hosts ===
- Joe Budden (2015–present)
- Richard Parks Vallely (2016–present)
- Antwan "Ish" Marby (2021–present)
- Lamar "Ice" Burney (2021–present)
- Trevor "Queenzflip" Robinson (2022–present)
- Marc Lamont Hill (2024–present)
- Damona "Don't Call Me White Girl" Love (2025–present)

=== Recurring hosts ===
- Emanny Salgado (2015–present)

=== Former hosts ===
- Rory Farrell (2015–2021)
- Marisa Mendez (2015–2016)
- Jamil "Mal" Clay (2016–2021)
- Melyssa Ford (2022–2025)

== Tour ==
During the summer of 2018, The Joe Budden Podcast began its first live tour, with performances taking place throughout numerous venues across the U.S. The tour continued into 2019, with dates added monthly. The live shows feature Q&A's, discussion, and occasional skits.

== Content ==
The show is primarily a hip-hop podcast, but other topics such as pop culture, sports, business, and social issues are regularly discussed. The show will occasionally feature musicians or music industry guests.

A regular fixture on the show is a phone-in "Friend of the Show" segment, where Budden will call someone to speak about a topic they submitted.

== Reception ==
The Joe Budden Podcast has received positive reviews from critics. The Source called Budden a "natural fit" for podcasting, and The New York Times praised Budden for being "brash, opinionated and blunt, but knowing what he's talking about", calling him "the Howard Stern of hip-hop".

== See also ==
- Music podcast
- List of music podcasts
