= Fire (Yes, Yes Y'all) =

Single by Joe Budden featuring Busta Rhymes

from the album Joe Budden
- Released: July 15, 2003
- Recorded: 2003
- Studio: Record One (Los Angeles, California)
- Genre: Hip hop; hip house
- Length: 4:21
- Label: Def Jam
- Songwriters: J. Budden; J. Smith; T. Smith; M. Gover; F. Ski; A. McLaran, Jr.
- Producer: Just Blaze

Joe Budden singles chronology
"Clubbin'" (2003)	"Fire (Yes, Yes Y'all)" (2003)	"Whatever U Want" (2004)

Busta Rhymes singles chronology
"I Know What You Want" (2003)	"Fire (Yes, Yes Y'all)" (2003)	"Light Your Ass on Fire" (2003)

"Fire (Yes, Yes Y'all)" (simply known as "Fire") is a song by American rapper Joe Budden featuring Busta Rhymes. Produced by Just Blaze, the song is the second single from Budden's 2003 eponymous debut album.

The song was featured in the film Mean Girls and the pilot episode of Entourage. Joe Budden had made a remix with Paul Cain and Fabolous which appeared on the latter's mixtape, "More Street Dreams, Pt. 2: The Mixtape".

== Track listing ==
12" Vinyl

Side A
No.	Title	Length
1.	"Fire (Yes, Yes Y'all) (Clean)" (featuring Busta Rhymes)
2.	"Fire (Yes, Yes Y'all) (Street)" (featuring Busta Rhymes)
3.	"Fire (Yes, Yes Y'all) (Instrumental)"

Side B
No.	Title	Length
1.	"Fire (Yes, Yes Y'all) (Clean)" (featuring Redman and Busta Rhymes)
2.	"Fire (Yes, Yes Y'all) (Street)" (featuring Redman and Busta Rhymes)
3.	"Fire (Yes, Yes Y'all) (Instrumental)"

== Credits ==
Recording

- Recorded at Record One, Los Angeles, California for N.Q.C. Management.
- Redman's vocals recorded at Enterprise Studios, Los Angeles, California.
- Mixed at Right Track Studios, New York City for Loreal, Inc.

Personnel

- Just Blaze – producer
- Envyi – vocals [additional]
- Busta Rhymes – featured artist
- Pat Viala – mixing
- Ryan West – engineer
- Wassim Zreik – engineer [Redman's verse]

== Charts ==
Chart (2003)	Peak position
US Billboard Hot R&B/Hip-Hop Songs	48
UK Singles Chart	128
