= Hard Knock TV =

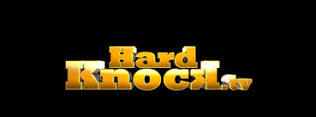
- The current logo for Hard Knock TV (since 2005)
- Website type: Online magazine, Youtube Channel
- Available in: English
- Owner: Nick Huff Barili
- Editor: Nick Huff Barili
- Launched: 2005
- Current status: Active

Hard Knock TV is a multi-platform video production and entertainment company founded in 2005 by Nick Huff Barili. The LA-based media outlet reports on Hip-Hop and urban music, culture, sports and lifestyle news via video interviews and editorial features.

== History ==
As a fifteen-year veteran in the music industry, Nick Huff Barili recognized the need for credible in-depth coverage of Hip-Hop culture and the emergence of new media, and set to launch Hard Knock TV as the first Hip-Hop show on YouTube. He originally pitched the idea of starting a web-based video series to a large agency in Los Angeles, but they assured him that people would prefer to watch content on television, rather than on the internet. Despite the feedback, Nick Huff Barili decided to launch Hard Knock TV independently on YouTube. Hard Knock TV initially gained notoriety for discovering and interviewing emerging talent in the Los Angeles area, one of which being K-Dot (now known as Kendrick Lamar). Hard Knock TV's video content en masse currently has over 70-million views, and its YouTube channel has over 140 thousand subscribers.

== Content ==
Hard Knock TV's trademark is providing interviews with Hip-Hop stars, as well producers and industry influencers. The most viewed interviews on Hard Knock TV's YouTube channel feature Wiz Khalifa, Kendrick Lamar, J. Cole, Macklemore, A$AP Rocky, Big Sean, Tyga, Childish Gambino, Common, Tech N9ne, Game, E-40, Ice Cube, Jay Electronica, Jhene Aiko, TI, 50 Cent, and Mac Miller. While the in-depth video interviews are Hard Knock's crown jewel, Hard Knock TV also publishes written interviews and music news on their website. Some of the artists interviewed for written features include Dilated People, Lil Bibby, DJ Mustard, Sir Michael Rocks, Audio Push, Fashawn, Jarren Benton, Killer Mike, Thurz, G-Eazy, and many more.

=== Hard Knock TV X The GRAMMY'S ===
Hard Knock TV continuously collaborates with The GRAMMYs to produce long-length interviews, conducted by Nick Huff Barili, to highlight the life and work of influential nominated artists such as Andre 3000, Pharrell, Chuck D, Common, Wiz Khalifa, and YG.

== Hard Knock Hoops & SXSW ==
Hard Knock Hoops is an annual three-on-three celebrity basketball tournament organized by Hard Knock TV. The annual tournament takes place in Austin, TX during the SXSW music festival and in Los Angeles in the summer time. The first tournament took place at SXSW in 2011 and was called "Hoop & Hang," a collaboration between Nick Huff Barili of Hard Knock TV and Gotty of The Smoking Section. Nick first approached him with the idea at the 2010 World Basketball Festival in NY, and with Gotty, went on to create a space at SXSW where artists and media could get together in a more intimate setting while sharing their love for music and basketball. The first annual LA Hard Knock Hoops tournament took place in 2012 as part of Hard Knock TV's 7 Year Anniversary Celebration, which was sponsored by Nike, and it is still held annually by Hard Knock TV. However, wanting to focus on its own brand and vision, Hard Knock TV ended its SXSW "Hoop & Hang" collaboration with TSS and carried on its own tournament at SXSW as Hard Knock Hoops in 2014.

Hard Knock Hoops has featured notable musicians such as Chris Brown, The Game, Taco of Odd Future, Quincy, Steelo Brim, Pac Div, Thurz, DJ Khalil, DJ Bizzy and Ben Lyons.
