= Joe Budden (album) =

Studio album by Joe Budden
- Released: June 10, 2003
- Recorded: 2002–2003
- Genre: Hip hop
- Length: 71:05
- Label: On Top; Skane; Def Jam
- Producer: Nitti (exec.); Terry Corley (exec.); Webb (exec.); Skane (co-exec.); White Boy (co-exec.); Just Blaze; Lofey

Joe Budden chronology
Joe Budden (2003)	Mood Muzik 3: The Album (2008)

Singles from Joe Budden
- 1. "Pump It Up" Released: April 29, 2003; 2. "Fire (Yes, Yes Y'all)" Released: July 15, 2003

Joe Budden is the debut studio album by American rapper Joe Budden. It was released on June 10, 2003, by On Top, distributed by Def Jam. Recording sessions took place from 2002 to 2003, with production by Dub B aka White Boy, along with the other high-profile producers such as Just Blaze and Lofey. The album features guest appearances from Lil' Mo, Busta Rhymes and 112. Upon the record's release, it was met with favorable reviews from music critics. Joe Budden debuted at number 8 on the US Billboard 200, selling 95,000 units in its first week, later the record sold 430,000+ copies in the United States. It also entered at number 55 on the UK Albums Chart.

Joe Budden was supported by two singles – the Just Blaze-produced club anthems "Pump It Up" and "Fire (Yes, Yes Y'all)" featuring Busta Rhymes, and two promotional singles – "Focus" and "Drop Drop". Its hit single "Pump It Up" was featured in 2 Fast 2 Furious, You Got Served and Madden NFL 2004, and reached at number 38 in the United States and number 13 in the United Kingdom. "Focus" was featured in Def Jam Vendetta. The album's second single, "Fire (Yes, Yes Y'all)" was released on July 15, 2003, and the song was featured in the movie Mean Girls. "Walk with Me" was featured as the final fight and end credits song for Def Jam: Fight for NY. Joe Budden was a playable character in both games.

== Singles ==
"Pump It Up", produced by Just Blaze, was released as the album's lead single on May 8, 2003, and was a commercial success. The song charted at number 16 on the US Billboard Hot R&B/Hip-Hop Songs, as well as its Hot R&B/Hip-Hop Airplay chart at number 18. The song peaked at number 38 on the US Billboard Hot 100 chart, number ten on the Hot Rap Songs chart, and number 39 on the Radio Songs chart. "Pump It Up" entered the UK Singles chart at number 13. The song's accompanying music video, directed by Erik White, premiered on April 16, 2003, to MTV. "Pump It Up" was also featured on soundtracks for hit movies like 2 Fast 2 Furious (2003) and You Got Served (2004), as well as the American football video game Madden NFL 2004. The song received one Grammy Award nomination for the Best Male Rap Solo Performance at the 46th Annual Grammy Awards, and was nominated for Best Original or Adapted Song at the 2004 Black Reel Awards for its appearance in the 2 Fast 2 Furious movie.

"Fire (Yes, Yes Y'all)", which features guest vocals by American rapper Busta Rhymes, was released as the second single from the album on July 15, 2003. The song peaked at number 18 on the US Billboard Hot R&B/Hip-Hop Airplay chart and number 48 on the Hot R&B/Hip-Hop Songs chart, as well as entering the UK Singles chart at number 128. Joe Budden has made a remix with fellow with rappers Paul Cain and Fabolous, which appeared on the latter's mixtape, titled More Street Dreams, Pt. 2: The Mixtape. "Fire" was featured in Tina Fey's 2004 movie Mean Girls, which starred Lindsay Lohan. It was also featured in the pilot episode of American comedy-drama television series Entourage.

=== Promotional singles ===
"Focus" was released as the album's first promotional single in 2002. The song spent seventeen weeks on the US Billboard Hot R&B/Hip-Hop Songs chart on which it peaked at number 43. Its official remix, featuring American hip hop recording artist LL Cool J, was also released for promotional purposes in 2002. "Focus" was featured on the soundtrack for the 2003 professional wrestling video game Def Jam Vendetta. No music video was shot for the song, but instead its intro appeared at the end of the music video of "Pump It Up". "Drop Drop" was released as the second promotional single in 2002. The song was featured on the soundtrack for the 2003 action film Cradle 2 the Grave, which starred Jet Li and rapper DMX, as well as the Platinum certified-soundtrack for the basketball video game NBA Live 2003. The song does not appear on the album.

== Critical reception ==
Professional ratings
Review scores
Source	Rating
AllMusic	4/5 stars
HipHopDX	4.5/5 stars
RapReviews	8/10
Rolling Stone	3/5 stars
SPIN	8/10
The Village Voice	(choice cut)
XXL	XL (4/5)

Upon its release, Joe Budden received generally favorable reviews from music critics. Jason Birchmeier of AllMusic thought the album was "promising, an omen of a greater things to come, for Budden as well as for listeners", but added that it "could use a couple more non-White Boy productions, if only for the sake of variety". Chris Ryan of Spin said: "This tension between bragging and insecurity, between the night out and the morning after, gives Joe Budden a singular spark. If the album falters, it's when Budden guns for crossover appeal; cameos by Lil' Mo and 112 reek of boardroom tampering. But even a bit of lab-tested R&B can't ruin this bold debut." HipHopDX reviewer K.B. Tindal wrote: "The joy in this CD is that Joe did it without shiny suits, without a lot of ice and without an over needed amount of featured guests. He did it with love for Hip-Hop and real lyrics and a dedication to himself to succeed at what he knows he's good at. Now if that's not inspiration then call me crazy. […] He's destined to be one of the best." Jon Caramanica, in his review for Rolling Stone, said that "Joe Budden's rhymes have two things many round-the-way rappers could use: wit and pathos." Robert Christgau cited "U Ain't Gotta Go Home" and "Calm Down" as "choice cuts" on "an album that isn't worth your time or money." Anslem Samuel of XXL commended Joe Budden for his "rapid-fire barbs in his signature fluctuating cadence" and thought the artist "excels [...] in his openness about his painful past", but added that there are "moments where he shoots and misfires".

== Track listing ==
No.	Title	Writer(s)	Producer(s)	Length
1.	"Intro"	Joseph Budden; Joseph Kuleszynski; Geddy Lee; Alex Lifeson; Neil Peart	White Boy	2:03
2.	"#1"	Budden; Eric Burdon; Bryan Chandler; Kuleszynski; Scott La Rock; Rodney Lemay; Alan Lomax; Lawrence Parker; Abrim Timon	White Boy	4:04
3.	"Pump It Up"	Robert Bell; Ronald Bell; George Brown; Budden; Robert Mickens; Claydes Charles Smith; Justin Smith; Dennis Thomas; Richard Westfield	Just Blaze	4:11
4.	"Pusha Man"	Budden; Kuleszynski	White Boy	4:18
5.	"U Ain't Gotta Go Home"	Budden; Kuleszynski	White Boy	4:54
6.	"Walk with Me"	Budden; Kuleszynski	White Boy	5:34
7.	"She Wanna Know" (featuring Lil' Mo)	Budden; Kuleszynski; Barry White	White Boy	4:24
8.	"Survivor"	Budden; Kuleszynski	White Boy	4:32
9.	"Fire (Yes, Yes Y'all)" (featuring Busta Rhymes)	Budden; Melvin Glover; Al McLaran, Jr.; Frank Ski; J. Smith; Trevor Smith	Just Blaze	4:21
10.	"Ma Ma Ma" (featuring 112)	Budden; Rufus Cooper III; Katari Cox; Yafeu Fula; Kuleszynski; Joseph Paquette; Tupac Shakur; Bruce Washington; Tyrone Wrice	White Boy	4:24
11.	"Calm Down"	Budden; Mike Gainous; Kuleszynski	White Boy	5:16
12.	"Focus"	Budden; Kuleszynski	White Boy	4:02
13.	"Give Me a Reason"	Budden; J. Smith	Just Blaze	3:07
14.	"Stand Up Nucca"	Budden; Kuleszynski	White Boy	3:18
15.	"10 Mins."	Budden; Michael "Lofey" Sandlofer	Lofey	10:01
Total length:				71:05

International bonus tracks
No.	Title	Writer(s)	Producer(s)	Length
16.	"Real Life in Rap"	Budden; Gainous; Kuleszynski; Dennis Lambert; Brian Potter	White Boy	4:22
17.	"Porno Star"	Budden; Kuleszynski	White Boy	3:13
Total length:				78:42

United Kingdom bonus track
No.	Title	Writer(s)	Producer(s)	Length
18.	"Gangsta Lean"	Budden; Kuleszynski	White Boy	3:53
Total length:				82:35

Japanese bonus track
No.	Title	Writer(s)	Producer(s)	Length
19.	"Breathe on 'Em"	Budden; Kuleszynski	White Boy

Leftover Tracks

- "Sacred"
- "Get Right Wit Me"
- "Drop Drop"
- "Focus (Remix)" (featuring LL Cool J and Dutchess)
- "Fire (Yes, Yes Y'all) (Remix)" (featuring Redman and Busta Rhymes)

Notes

- "#1" features additional vocals from White Boy
- "Pusha Man" features additional vocals from Maisha Parker and Mike Gainous.
- "Walk with Me" features additional from Kiyamma Griffin and Mike Gainous.
- "Survivor" features additional from Kiyamma Griffin.
- "Fire" features additional from Envyi.
- "Calm Down" features additional and background arrangements from Mike Gainous.
- "Real Life in Rap" features additional from Mike Gainous.

Sample credits

- "Intro" contains a sample of "Lock and Key" performed by Rush.
- "#1" contains a sample of "I'm Still #1" and "The Bridge Is Over" performed by Boogie Down Productions, "Sound of da Police" by KRS-One, "Blues and Pants" performed by James Brown, and an interpolation of "Baby Let Me Take You (In My Arms)", written by Abrim Timon.
- "Pump It Up" contains a sample of "Soul Vibrations" performed by Kool & the Gang, and "The Payback" performed by James Brown.
- "She Wanna Know" contains a sample of "I Love You So / Never Wanna Let You Go" performed by Love Unlimited Orchestra.
- "Fire" contains an interpolation of "Superrappin'", written by Melvin Gover, and "Whores In This House", written by Frank Ski and Al McLaran, Jr.
- "Ma Ma Ma" contains an interpolation of "Hail Mary", written by Rufus Cooper III, Katari Cox, Yafeu Fula, Joseph Paquette, Tupac Shakur, Bruce Washington and Tyrone Wrice.
- "Real Life in Rap" contains a sample of "Right On Brother" performed by The Four Tops.

== Credits and personnel ==
Credits for Joe Budden adapted from AllMusic and from the album liner notes.

- 112 – guest artist, primary artist, vocals
- Geoff Allen – engineer
- Chris Athens – mastering
- Hector "Rick Boogie" Aviles – A&R
- Robert "Kool" Bell – composer
- Ronald Bell – composer
- George "Funky" Brown – composer
- Joseph "Joe Budden" Budden – composer, primary artist
- Eric Burdon – composer
- Terrence Cash – engineer
- Bryan James Chandler – composer
- Rufus Cooper III – composer
- Terry Corley – executive producer
- Katari Cox – composer
- Tyson Davis – A&R coordination
- Envyi – vocals [additional]
- Yafeu Fula – composer
- Mike Gainous – vocals [additional]
- James Genus – bass
- Melvin Glover – composer
- Kiyamma Griffin – vocals [additional]
- Bob Iadeluca – engineer, guitar
- Ken "Duro" Ifill – mixing
- Tia Johnson – art direction, design
- Terese Joseph – recording administration
- Joseph "White Boy" Kuleszynski – co-executive producer, composer, engineer, producer, vocals [additional]
- Dennis Lambert – composer
- Scott La Rock – composer
- Geddy Lee – composer
- Rodney Lemay – composer
- Ken Lewis – mixing
- Alex Lifeson – composer
- Lil' Mo – guest artist, vocals
- Alan Lomax – composer
- Robert "Spike" Mickens – composer
- Nitti – executive producer
- Joseph Paquette – composer
- Lawrence Krisna Parker – composer
- Maisha Parker – vocals [additional]
- Brian Potter – composer
- Michael "Lofey" Sandlofer – arranger, composer, conductor, drums, engineer, keyboards, percussion, strings
- Tupac Shakur – composer
- Skane – A&R, co-executive producer
- Frank Ski – composer
- Claydes "E.X." Smith – composer
- Justin "Just Blaze" Smith – composer, producer
- Trevor "Busta Rhymes" Smith – composer, guest artist
- Billy Jay Stein – keyboards [additional], string arrangements, strings [additional], string writing
- Dennis "D.T." Thomas – composer
- Patrick Viala – mixing
- Webb – executive producer
- Bruce Washington – composer
- Ryan West – engineer
- Barry White – composer
- Tyrone Wrice – composer

== Chart positions ==
Chart (2003)	Peak position
Canadian Albums (Nielsen SoundScan)	50
Canadian R&B Albums (Nielsen SoundScan)	6
UK Albums Chart	55
UK R&B Albums (Official Charts)	8
US Billboard 200	8
US Top R&B/Hip-Hop Albums (Billboard)	2
