= More Street Dreams, Pt. 2: The Mixtape =

Mixtape by Fabolous
- Released: November 4, 2003
- Genre: Hip hop
- Labels: Desert Storm, Elektra
- Producers: Fabolous (exec.), DJ Clue (exec.), DURO (exec.), Mr. Fingaz, Needlz, DJ Scratchator

Fabolous chronology
Street Dreams (2003)	More Street Dreams, Pt. 2: The Mixtape (2003)	Real Talk (2004)

Singles from More Street Dreams, Pt. 2: The Mixtape
- 1. "Make U Mine/Think Y'all Know" Released: 2003

Professional ratings
Review scores
Source	Rating
AllMusic	2.5/5 stars
RapReviews	7/10
XXL	XL (4/5)

More Street Dreams, Pt. 2: The Mixtape is the first official mixtape by American rapper Fabolous. It was released on November 4, 2003, through Desert Storm Records and Elektra Records. The mixtape included a computer program that allowed listeners to remix one of the tracks. More Street Dreams debuted at number 28 on the Billboard 200 and number 9 on the Billboard Top R&B/Hip-Hop Albums chart. As of November 2004, it had sold 159,000 copies.

== Track listing ==
No.	Title	Producer(s)/Original instrumental	Length
1.	"Niggaz" (featuring Joe Budden and Paul Cain)	"Some Niggaz" by Half a Mill	4:25
2.	"Now What"	"What!" by Eve featuring Truth Hurts	2:20
3.	"Rims" (Skit)		3:11
4.	"Now Ride"	DJ Scratch	2:44
5.	"Think Y'all Know"	Needlz	3:20
6.	"Chicks" (Skit)		0:33
7.	"Make U Mine" (featuring Mike Shorey)	DJ Clue?, Duro	2:58
8.	"Faboloso"	"Who's That" by R. Kelly featuring Fat Joe	1:32
9.	"Fire (Remix)" (Joe Budden featuring Fabolous and Paul Cain)	Just Blaze	4:22
10.	"I Usually Don't"	Mr. Fingaz	2:37
11.	"Renegade" (featuring Paul Cain)	"Renegade" by Jay-Z featuring Eminem	3:46
12.	"Fuck You Too" (featuring Paul Cain)	"Fuck You" by The Lox	4:28
13.	"B.K. Style"	"This Is Who I Am" by Lil' Kim featuring Swizz Beatz and Mashonda	3:23
14.	"Can't Let You Go (Remix)"	Just Blaze	4:39
Total length:			50:47

== Personnel ==
- Fabolous - Vocal, Producer, Executive Producer
- DJ Clue - Producer, Executive Producer
- DURO - Producer, Executive Producer
- DJ Scratchator - Producer
- Mr. Fingaz - Producer
- Needlz - Producer
- Ken "DURO" Ifill - Engineer, Mixer
- Paul Gregory - Assistant Engineer
- Suzanne Burge - Product Manager
- Anita Marisa Boriboon - Art Direction
- Godfrey Lopez - Art Direction
- Sherry Clardy - Artist Coordination

== Charts ==
Chart (2003)	Peak position
US Billboard 200	28
US Top R&B/Hip-Hop Albums (Billboard)	9
