= Mood Muzik 3: For Better or for Worse =

Mood Muzik 3: For Better Or for Worse

Mixtape by Joe Budden
- Released: December 15, 2007
- Genre: Hip hop

Joe Budden chronology
Mood Muzik 2: Can It Get Any Worse? (2005)	Mood Muzik 3: For Better Or for Worse (2007)	Mood Muzik 4: A Turn 4 The Worst (2010)

Mood Muzik 3: For Better or For Worse (originally titled Mood Muzik 3: It's About to Get Worse) is the third installment in the Mood Muzik series by American rapper Joe Budden and DJ On Point.

== Background ==
After almost two years of pushing back scheduled release dates, it was finally released on December 15, 2007. According to Allhiphop magazine, Joe Budden's latest offering is proof that the artist has not missed a step. Vibe Magazine called this mixtape "the sequel to the masterpiece", in reference to Mood Muzik 2: Can It Get Any Worse?. Shortly after the album's release, Budden released Mood Muzik 3.5, which is the same album without DJ tags, except for the exclusion of the Killa BH skits, and the inclusion of two new tracks—"4 Walls", which samples Eddie Holman's "Four Walls", and "Un4Given", which samples Metallica's "The Unforgiven". An official retail version—Mood Muzik 3: The Album—was released on February 26, 2008.

== Critical reception ==
Professional ratings
Review scores
Source	Rating
AllHipHop.com	(8/10)
HipHopDx	5/5 stars
DJBooth.net	4/5 stars
RapReviews	8.5/10
YoRapper.com	5/5 stars

The mixtape received critical acclaim from critics.

== Track listing ==
No.	Title	Producer(s)	Length
1.	"Hiatus"	Mellow Madness	5:47
2.	"Ventilation"	Klasix	3:34
3.	"Talk To 'Em"	WSM The Sultan	3:28
4.	"Warfare" (featuring Joell Ortiz)	Klasix	2:48
5.	"Invisible Man" (featuring Emanny)	Chemo	3:27
6.	"Dear Diary"	WSM The Sultan	4:47
7.	"Get No Younger"	Klasix	3:22
8.	"Star Inside" (featuring Suzy Q)	Dub B	3:48
9.	"Killa BH Skit"		0:55
10.	"Send Him Our Love"	Klasix	4:53
11.	"Family Reunion" (featuring Ransom, Hitchcock and Fabolous)	Shatek The Producer	6:32
12.	"5th Gear"	WSM The Sultan	3:59
13.	"Roll Call"	WSM The Sultan	3:59
14.	"Secrets"	Klasix	5:50
15.	"All Of Me" (featuring Emanny)	Klasix	7:26
16.	"Foldger's Brother" (featuring Killa BH)	Kanye West	2:03
17.	"Long Way To Go" (featuring Mr Probz)	Soulsearchin', Louis Gibzen	4:30
18.	"Thou Shall Not Fall"	Klasix	4:20
19.	"Still My Hood"	Wyks	4:13
