= All Love Lost =

Studio album by Joe Budden
- Released: October 16, 2015
- Recorded: 2013–2015
- Genre: Hip-hop
- Length: 65:57
- Labels: Mood Muzik; eOne
- Producers: 8 Bars; AraabMuzik; Boi-1da; Chigz; DJ Dahi; Karon Graham; Louis Bell; Mr. Fingaz; Parks; Vinylz

Joe Budden chronology
Some Love Lost (2014)	All Love Lost (2015)	Rage & The Machine (2016)

Singles from All Love Lost
- 1. "Broke" Released: July 20, 2015; 2. "Slaughtermouse" Released: September 17, 2015

All Love Lost is the seventh studio album by American rapper Joe Budden. The album was released on October 16, 2015, by eOne Music. The album features guest appearances from Katelyn Tarver, Jadakiss, Marsha Ambrosius, Emanny, Felicia Temple, Eric Bellinger and Yummy Bingham. The album was supported by two singles; "Broke" and "Slaughtermouse".

== Singles ==
On July 20, 2015, the album's first single, "Broke" was released. On September 8, 2015, the music video was released for "Broke". On September 17, 2015, the album's second single, "Slaughtermouse" was released.

== Critical reception ==
Professional ratings
Review scores
Source	Rating
AllMusic	4/5 stars
HipHopDX	3.5/5 stars
XXL	XL

All Love Lost received universal acclaim from music critics. Kellen Miller of XXL said, "One becomes so engrossed in Budden’s hypnotic confession-as-art lyrical display of repeated drug relapses, depression and relationship drama that the music both forgives and transcends his past digressions." Jesse Fairfax of HipHopDX said, "Joe Budden’s recorded therapy gives a voice to the lost, but despite his enormous lyrical ability, All Love Lost finds Joe making music as much for his own catharsis than connecting his laments to either other emotions inside him or the world at large."

== Commercial performance ==
The album debuted at number 29 on the Billboard 200, selling 14,229 copies in the United States.

== Track listing ==
No.	Title	Writer(s)	Producer(s)	Length
1.	"(Intro) All Love Lost"	Joe Budden; Emanny Salgado; Jason "8 Bars" Carr	8 Bars; Parks^{[a]}	7:21
2.	"Broke" (featuring Katelyn Tarver)	Budden; Whitney Phillips	Louis Bell	4:21
3.	"Playing Our Part"	Budden; Carr	8 Bars; Parks^{[a]}	6:50
4.	"Man Down"	Budden	Chigz; Dark Night; Parks^{[a]}	4:48
5.	"Immortal"	Budden; Salgado; Matthew Samuels; Anderson Hernandez	Boi-1da; Vinylz	5:14
6.	"Love, I'm Good"	Budden; Abraham Orellana	AraabMuzik; Karon Graham^{[b]}	7:59
7.	"Make It Through the Night" (featuring Marsha Ambrosius and Jadakiss)	Budden; Marsha Ambrosius; Jason Phillips; Michael Williams; Dejon Howerton; Taiwan "Mr. Fingaz" Green	Mr. Fingaz	5:09
8.	"Slaughtermouse"	Budden; Orellana	AraabMuzik	4:50
9.	"Where Do We Go" (featuring Eric Bellinger)	Budden; Salgado	Chigz; Dark Night; Parks^{[b]}	7:11
10.	"Unnecessary Pain" (featuring Yummy Bingham and Felicia Temple)	Budden; Salgado; Yummy Bingham; Carr	8 Bars; Dark Night; Parks^{[a]}	5:48
11.	"Love for You" (featuring Emanny)	Budden; Salgado; Samuels	Boi-1da	6:20
Total length:				65:57

Deluxe edition (bonus tracks)
No.	Title	Writer(s)	Producer(s)	Length
12.	"Only Human" (featuring Emanny)	Budden; Salgado; Karon Graham	Graham	8:46
13.	"Fuck 'Em All"	Budden; Dacoury Natche	DJ Dahi	3:44
Total length:				78:30

Notes

- ^{^a} signifies an additional producer.
- ^{^b} signifies a co-producer.

== Charts ==
Chart (2015)	Peak position
US Billboard 200	29
US Top R&B/Hip-Hop Albums (Billboard)	6
