= Mood Muzik 2: Can It Get Any Worse? =

Mixtape by Joe Budden
- Released: January 2006
- Recorded: 2004–2005
- Genre: Rap

Joe Budden chronology
Mood Muzik: The Worst of Joe Budden (2003)	Mood Muzik 2: Can It Get Any Worse? (2005)	Mood Muzik 3: For Better or for Worse (2007)

Mood Muzik 2: Can It Get Any Worse? is the second mixtape in the Mood Muzik series by Joe Budden.

== Critical reception ==
Professional ratings
Review scores
Source	Rating
RapReviews	8/10

Although released as a mixtape, it is critically acclaimed and has been reviewed favorably by The New York Times. In a retrospective review, Complex Magazine named it the 12th best mixtape of all time and wrote "It turned out that deep in the dungeons of rap—where his addictions, ambitions, and failures were laid bare—Budden's potential could be fully realized." In a positive review RapReviews wrote "Why would Def Jam sign such a talented, introspective, verbose and charismatic rapper and then sit on his work without releasing it, even though he bodies track after track? Thankfully Budden decided not to wait any more and DJ On Point was willing to help him make it happen."

== Track listing ==
No.	Title	Producer(s)	Length
1.	"Intro"	DJ On Point	1:41
2.	"Are You In That Mood Yet?"	Mark Batson	3:33
3.	"Old School Mouse"	Ron Browz	4:20
4.	"Killa BH Skit Part 1"	DJ On Point	1:34
5.	"6 Minutes Of Death" (featuring Jae Millz and Stack Bundles)	NeoDa Matrix	6:53
6.	"So Serious"	C4	2:46
7.	"Get It Poppin'"	Soul Diggaz	2:42
8.	"The Future"	Dub B	4:47
9.	"If I Die Tomorrow"	E-Zo	6:07
10.	"Young Niggaz"	Ron Browz	3:47
11.	"Phone Sex" (Interlude)	Joe Budden	1:09
12.	"World Takeover"	C4	3:44
13.	"Dumb Out"	The Architechs	7:46
14.	"Killa BH Skit Part 2"		1:11
15.	"Ghetto America" (Snippet)	C4	1:06
16.	"What's Up" (featuring Newz and A-Team)	Cole Seer	4:12
17.	"40 Licks"	Nelly Nel	3:36
18.	"For A Reason"	Boola	4:39
19.	"Three Sides To A Story"	Scott Storch	7:32
20.	"Stained"	Scram Jones	4:11
