= Halfway House (album) =

Studio album by Joe Budden
- Released: October 28, 2008
- Genre: Hip hop
- Length: 48:03
- Label: Amalgam Digital
- Producers: Pro Logic; Mizfit Soundz; Blastah Beatz; Rodney Hazard; Scram Jones; Evo (Beats Ink); Cardiak; VTZ; The Klasix; Malay

Joe Budden chronology
Mood Muzik 3: The Album (2008)	Halfway House (2008)	Padded Room (2009)

Singles from Halfway House
- 1. "Touch & Go" Released: April 1, 2008

Halfway House is the third studio album by American rapper Joe Budden, released on October 28, 2008 exclusively in digital format through Amalgam Digital. Halfway House was released when Joe Budden's fourth studio album, Padded Room, had been pushed back. Its release marked Joe Budden's first return to the Billboard 200 in five years, and approximately 3,000 downloads were sold in its first week of release. The album is notable for featuring the first collaboration between the four members of Slaughterhouse on the track, "Slaughterhouse."

== Critical reception ==
Professional ratings
Review scores
Source	Rating
AllHipHop	7/10
DJBooth.net	4/5 stars
Punknews.org	5/5 stars
The Smoking Section	3.5/5 stars

Upon its release, Halfway House was met with generally favorable reviews from music critics. AllHipHop's Greg Watkins gave the album a seven out of ten, saying, "While Halfway House takes a slight dip from the high standards set forth by the Mood [Muzik] series, it is still a respectable effort. Joe Budden proves that he is still one of the games[sic] best kept secrets regardless of a release date." Nathan S. of DJBooth.net gave the album a four out of five, saying, "Joe Budden is to album delays what Snoop is to weed smoking – just about everyone does it now and again, but not like these guys. These delays seemingly stem from Budden's refusal to put out an inferior product, which is what makes him so good, but that kind of perfectionism can be paralyzing. Let's just hope the next time we hear from Budden it will be because he released Padded Room, not ended up in one."

TC of The Smoking Section gave the album a 3.5 out of five, saying, "Much to Budden's credit, Halfway House serves as one his more focused offerings, allowing more room for song structure opposed to the long-winded diatribes he's made his forte. Still with yet another album completed stuffed with mood music, and one named Padded Room looming on the horizon, the prognosis for the removal of the straitjacket that allows him to be Joe Budden while simultaneously restraining his artistic growth, is still to be determined." Punknews.org reviewer, Anchors, gave the album five stars out of five, saying "That never-quit attitude has been Budden's trademark for years, and it makes him somewhat of an anomaly in 2008. There's no niche for that kind of approach. He's too intelligent for the gangsta-rap tag and too gangsta for the backrap-rap title. He's an East Coast rapper with Tupac's West Coast introspection. He's a Jersey City rapper with Biggie's Brooklyn storytelling."

== Track listing ==
No.	Title	Producer(s)	Length
1.	"Intro"	Pro Logic	1:49
2.	"On My Grind"	Mizfitz Soundz	4:17
3.	"Overkill" (featuring Heartbreak)	Blastah Beatz	3:02
4.	"Check Me Out"	Mizfitz Soundz	3:40
5.	"Sidetracked"	Rodney Hazard	3:48
6.	"Slaughterhouse" (featuring Joell Ortiz, Nino Bless, Crooked I & Royce da 5'9")	Scram Jones	7:02
7.	"Under the Sun"	Evo Productions (Miguel Valor)	4:33
8.	"The Soul"	Cardiak	4:09
9.	"Anything Goes"	Mizfitz Soundz	3:57
10.	"Go to Hell"	Blastah Beatz	3:46
11.	"Just to Be Different"	VTZ	4:20
12.	"Touch & Go"	The Klasix	3:40
Total length:			48:03

Amalgam Digital bonus tracks
No.	Title	Producer(s)	Length
13.	"Better Me"	The Klasix	6:18
14.	"One Night Fuck" (featuring Emanny)	Malay	4:06
Total length:			58:27

Notes

- "One Night Fuck" uses the same production as "If It Wasn't for You" as performed by Day26.

Sample credits

- "On My Grind" contains a sample from "Suite Madame Blue" performed by Styx.
- "Check Me Out" contains a sample from "Silly Love Song" performed by Enchantment.
- "Sidetracked" contains a sample from "Lost!" performed by Coldplay.
- "Under the Sun" contains a sample from "Brothers Under the Sun" performed by Bryan Adams.
- "Go to Hell" contains a sample from "Go to Hell" performed by Alice Cooper.
- "Just to Be Different" contains a sample from "Burning Bright" performed by Shinedown.
- "Better Me" contains a sample from "Dig" performed by Incubus.

== Chart positions ==
Chart (2008)	Provider	Peak position
US Billboard 200	Billboard	184
US Top Digital Albums	Billboard	184
US Top Independent Albums	Billboard	25
