= Gangsta Party (Joe Budden song) =

Single by Joe Budden featuring Nate Dogg

from the album The Growth
- Released: May 25, 2005
- Genre: Hip hop
- Length: 3:59
- Label: On Top, Def Jam
- Songwriter(s): Budden, Scott Storch, Nate Dogg
- Producer(s): Scott Storch

Joe Budden singles chronology
"Whatever U Want" (2004)	"Gangsta Party" (2005)	"She Don't Put It Down" (2013)

Nate Dogg singles chronology
"Thugs Get Lonely Too" (2004)	"Gangsta Party" (2005)	"Hush Is Coming" (2005)

"Gangsta Party" is a song by Joe Budden, featuring Nate Dogg and produced by Scott Storch. It was supposed be the first single from Joe Budden's intended second album The Growth which was supposed to be released in June 2005. However the album had suffered numerous delays and was later shelved after a dispute with Def Jam. Continued disagreements between Budden and Def Jam forced the two sides to part ways.

== Track listing ==
1. "Gangsta Party (Radio)"
2. "Gangsta Party (Dirty)"
3. "Gangsta Party (Instrumental)"

== Charts ==
Chart (2005)	Peak Position
U.S. Billboard Hot R&B/Hip-Hop Songs	94
