= Some Love Lost =

Mixtape by Joe Budden
- Released: November 4, 2014
- Recorded: 2013–2014
- Genre: Hip-hop
- Length: 36:48
- Label: Mood Muzik Entertainment, E1 Music
- Producer: 8 Bars, The Breed, DJ Pain 1, Karon Graham

Joe Budden chronology
No Love Lost (2013)	Some Love Lost (2014)	All Love Lost (2015)

Some Love Lost is a retail mixtape by American rapper Joe Budden. The mixtape was released on November 4, 2014, by Mood Muzik Entertainment and E1 Music.

== Critical reception ==
Professional ratings
Review scores
Source	Rating
AllMusic	4/5 stars
HipHopDX	3.5/5 stars
XXL	(XL)

Carl Lamarre of XXL said, "While Some Love Lost serves as merely an appetizer to his upcoming album All Love Lost, Joe Budden's anguish and candor on this project will do more than enough to hold over his ravenous fan base." Andre Grant of HipHopDX stated, "As a meal before the main course, Some Love Lost, is a lonely one. But Joe’s change in style (to the autobiographical slaughter it is now) is interesting, and he claims he's got his best work on deck. As for this one, it is an ambitious dumping of his tragedies on paper. But it also leaves Joe and this project rolling a rock up hill that never quite gets there."

== Commercial performance ==
The album debuted at number 55 on the Billboard 200, with sales of 7,695 copies in the United States.

== Track listing ==
No.	Title	Producer(s)	Length
1.	"Intro"	Karon Graham	1:45
2.	"The Way You Love Me" (featuring Felicia Temple)	Karon Graham	4:13
3.	"Only Human" (featuring Emanny)	Karon Graham	8:46
4.	"Alive"	DJ Pain 1	6:31
5.	"Poker in the Sky"	8 Bars	5:18
6.	"OLS4"	The Breed	5:10
7.	"Different Love"	8 Bars	5:05
Total length:			36:48
