= Pump It Up (Joe Budden song) =

2003 single by Joe Budden

Single by Joe Budden

from the album Joe Budden and 2 Fast 2 Furious
- B-side: "Get Right with Me"; "Drop Drop"
- Released: March 24, 2003
- Genre: Hip hop
- Length: 4:04
- Label: Def Jam
- Songwriters: Joe Budden; Justin Smith; Robert Bell; George Brown; Robert Mickens; Claydes Smith; Dennis Thomas; Richard Westfield; James Brown; Fred Wesley; John Starks
- Producer: Just Blaze

Joe Budden singles chronology
"Last Words" (2003)	"Pump It Up" (2003)	"Clubbin'" (2003)

Music video
- "Pump It Up" on YouTube

"Pump It Up" is a song by American rapper Joe Budden. It was released on March 24, 2003, as the lead single from his self-titled debut album (2003) and the soundtrack for 2 Fast 2 Furious (2003). The song peaked at number 38 on the US Billboard Hot 100 and at number 13 in the United Kingdom.

Produced by Just Blaze, the beat was originally turned down by Beanie Sigel, Freeway and Jay-Z before Budden used it. It contains a sample from "Soul Vibrations" as performed by Kool & the Gang and "The Payback" as performed by James Brown. The song was nominated for the Best Male Rap Solo Performance award at the 46th Annual Grammy Awards.

== Music video ==
The music video for "Pump It Up" was partially inspired by the 2002 film, The Ring, and begins with three women (one of them played by video model Liza Rivera) putting a videotape containing "Pump It Up" into a VCR player. Joe Budden then appears on the television screen and eventually walks out of it, when the video cuts to him performing the song to a large crowd in a park. The music video features cameos from DJ Envy, DJ Clue, Just Blaze, Webb & Nitty, Skane Dolla, and Dub-B. The video was premiered on April 11, 2003.

== Remix ==
The official remix is a mash-up of two beef freestyles by Jay-Z and Budden against the other person. Jay-Z's freestyle of the song is included in the deluxe edition of his compilation album, The Hits Collection, Volume One (2010).

On December 12, 2015, during a guest appearance on an episode of Abstract Radio, a Beats 1 radio show on Apple Music hosted by rapper Q-Tip, Just Blaze debuted some exclusive unreleased music, which included an unreleased official remix of the song with a verse by the rapper Busta Rhymes.

== Track listings ==
US 12-inch single

1. "Pump It Up" (clean) – 4:14
2. "Pump It Up" (dirty) – 4:13
3. "Pump It Up" (instrumental) – 4:13
4. "Pump It Up" (a cappella) – 4:09

European CD single

1. "Pump It Up" (radio version)
2. "Get Right with Me"

UK 12-inch single

A1. "Pump It Up" – 4:13
A2. "Pump It Up" (instrumental) – 4:13
B1. "Drop Drop" – 4:21

UK CD single

1. "Pump It Up" – 4:13
2. "Drop Drop" – 4:21
3. "Pump It Up" (instrumental) – 4:13
4. "Pump It Up" (video)

UK cassette single

1. "Pump It Up" – 4:13
2. "Drop Drop" – 4:21
3. "Pump It Up" (instrumental) – 4:13

== Charts ==
=== Weekly charts ===
Chart (2003)	Peak position
Canada (Nielsen SoundScan)	41
Europe (Eurochart Hot 100)	44
Germany (GfK)	80
Scotland Singles (Official Charts)	20
Switzerland (Schweizer Hitparade)	90
UK Singles (Official Charts)	13
UK Hip Hop/R&B (Official Charts)	4
US Billboard Hot 100	38
US Hot R&B/Hip-Hop Songs (Billboard)	16
US Hot Rap Songs (Billboard)	10
US Rhythmic Airplay (Billboard)	18

=== Year-end charts ===
Chart (2003)	Position
UK Urban (Music Week)	36
US Hot R&B/Hip-Hop Singles & Tracks (Billboard)	60
US Rhythmic Top 40 (Billboard)	76

== Certifications ==
Region	Certification	Certified units/sales
United States (RIAA)	Gold	500,000^{‡}
^{‡} Sales+streaming figures based on certification alone.

== Release history ==
Region	Date	Format(s)	Label(s)	Ref.
United States	March 24, 2003	Rhythmic contemporary; urban radio	Def Jam Recordings	
United Kingdom	July 7, 2003	12-inch vinyl; CD; cassette	Def Jam Recordings	
