= Mood Muzik 4: A Turn 4 the Worst =

Mood Muzik 4: A Turn 4 The Worst

Mixtape by Joe Budden
- Released: October 26, 2010 (Online) November 9, 2010 (Retail)
- Genre: Hip hop
- Label: Mood Muzik; E1
- Producer: Sean C & LV; Fliccs; Scott Storch; J. Cardim; Karon; David "Boom" Pinks; Beewirks; Kanye West; Frequency; The Maven Boys; Just Blaze; Nascent; QB; Gab Parker

Joe Budden chronology
Mood Muzik 3: For Better or for Worse (2007)	Mood Muzik 4: A Turn 4 The Worst (2010)	A Loose Quarter (2012)

Professional ratings
Review scores
Source	Rating
AllMusic	4/5 stars
DJBooth.net	4/5 stars

Mood Muzik 4: A Turn 4 The Worst is the 4th and latest installment to the Mood Muzik series by rapper Joe Budden.

== Background ==
During an interview, Joe Budden stated that Mood Muzik 4 would be "less dark" than the previous installments. A pre-order of an autographed copy is also available for purchase. During the recording process, three trailers were released to promote the mixtape. Snippets of '1000 Faces' and 'Black Cloud' are heard on the first and second trailers respectively, and 'Stuck in the Moment' is featured on the third and final trailer. The mixtape was released for retail sale on November 9, 2010. The mixtape was re-released as Mood Muzik 4.5 on May 24, 2011 with 7 previously unreleased tracks. Producer J. Cardim handles most of the production for the tape. The art direction of Mood Muzik 4.5 was handled by Brett Lindzen.

== Commercial performance ==
The mixtape debuted at number 94 on the Billboard 200 and has since sold 13,500 copies.

== Track listing ==
No.	Title	Producer(s)	Length
1.	"Pray For Them" (Intro)	Sean C & LV	4:41
2.	"Aftermath"	Fliccs	4:25
3.	"Role Reversal"	Scott Storch	3:43
4.	"Come Along"	J. Cardim	4:51
5.	"Mop Salad" (Skit)	Karon	1:59
6.	"Sober Up" (featuring Crooked I)	J. Cardim	5:33
7.	"Dessert For Thought" (featuring Styles P and Pusha T)	David "Boom" Pinks	3:59
8.	"1000 Faces"	Beewirks	4:45
9.	"Inseperable" (featuring MeLa Machinko)	Beewirks	5:42
10.	"Is It The Shoes?" (Skit)	Kanye West	2:09
11.	"Remember The Titans" (featuring Fabolous, Lloyd Banks and Royce da 5'9")	J. Cardim	6:36
12.	"Welcome To Real Life" (featuring Emanny)	Frequency	4:41
13.	"No Idea"	J. Cardim	5:24
14.	"Black Cloud"	Megaman & Zalezy (of The Maven Boys)	5:54
15.	"Follow My Lead" (featuring Joell Ortiz)	J. Cardim	5:36
16.	"Stuck In The Moment" (featuring Emanny)	Just Blaze	5:58
17.	"If All Else Fails"	Nascent, QB, Gab Parker	3:09
