= Joe Budden =

American rapper (born 1980)

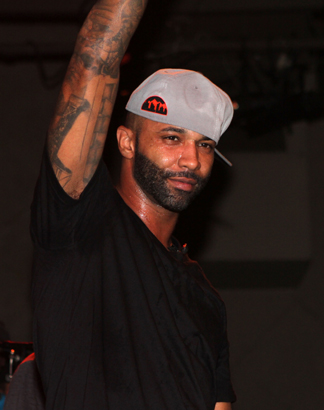
- Budden performing in 2012
- Born: August 31, 1980 (age 46); New York City, U.S.
- Occupations: Broadcaster; rapper; songwriter
- Years active: 1999–present
- Television: The Joe Budden Podcast; Everyday Struggle; State of the Culture
- Children: 2
- Musical career
- Origin: Jersey City, New Jersey, U.S.
- Genre: East Coast hip-hop
- Instrument: Vocals
- Labels: Mood Muzik; Empire; E1 Music; Amalgam Digital; Desert Storm; Def Jam
- Formerly of: Slaughterhouse
- Website: joebudden.com

Joseph Anthony Budden II (born August 31, 1980) is an American broadcaster and former rapper. He first gained recognition with his 2003 single "Pump It Up", which peaked in the top 40 of the Billboard Hot 100 and preceded the release of his eponymous debut studio album (2003). A critical and commercial success, the album peaked in the top ten of the Billboard 200, although it was his only major label release for Def Jam Recordings. He released seven more independent albums to continued critical praise. While doing so, he performed as a member of the hip-hop supergroup Slaughterhouse, who signed with Eminem's Shady Records in 2012; the group released two studio albums. In 2014, he was made fun of in episode nine, "Tombstone," of Loiter Squad's third season, with his beard divorcing him, played by rapper Earl Sweatshirt.

In 2018, he retired from recording and shifted focus onto his career in broadcasting. Three years prior, he began hosting The Joe Budden Podcast, which has been running for 900 episodes. In 2017, he had a much-publicized run as a co-host (alongside DJ Akademiks) for Complex magazine's web show Everyday Struggle. He hosted State of the Culture alongside Remy Ma for the network Revolt from 2018 to 2020. For his outspoken views on prominent hip-hop figures, Budden has been described as "the Howard Stern of hip-hop".

== Early life ==
Budden was born to Joseph Budden and Fay Southerland on August 31, 1980, in the East Harlem neighborhood of Upper Manhattan, New York City. He moved to Jersey City, New Jersey, at the age of thirteen with his mother and older brother, where he attended Lincoln High School. Budden's father was absent from his life during his childhood, a subject he would later address in his music.

Budden was a troubled youth and sent to Laurinburg Institute, a boarding school in North Carolina, where he began to hone his skills as a rapper. After returning to Jersey, he began using drugs, developing an addiction to angel dust. After an emotional confrontation with his mother, Budden voluntarily went into rehab on July 3, 1997, in exchange for him being allowed to attend his senior prom. Budden did not earn his diploma and fathered a child with an older woman by the age of 20. With his son on the way, Budden began taking music more seriously. In 2001, he teamed up with producer Dub-B, also known as White Boy, and began releasing his first mixtapes and demos, one of which ended up in the hands of Hot 97 radio host and Desert Storm Records label head DJ Clue.

== Career ==
=== Breakthrough, self-titled debut (2002–2003) ===
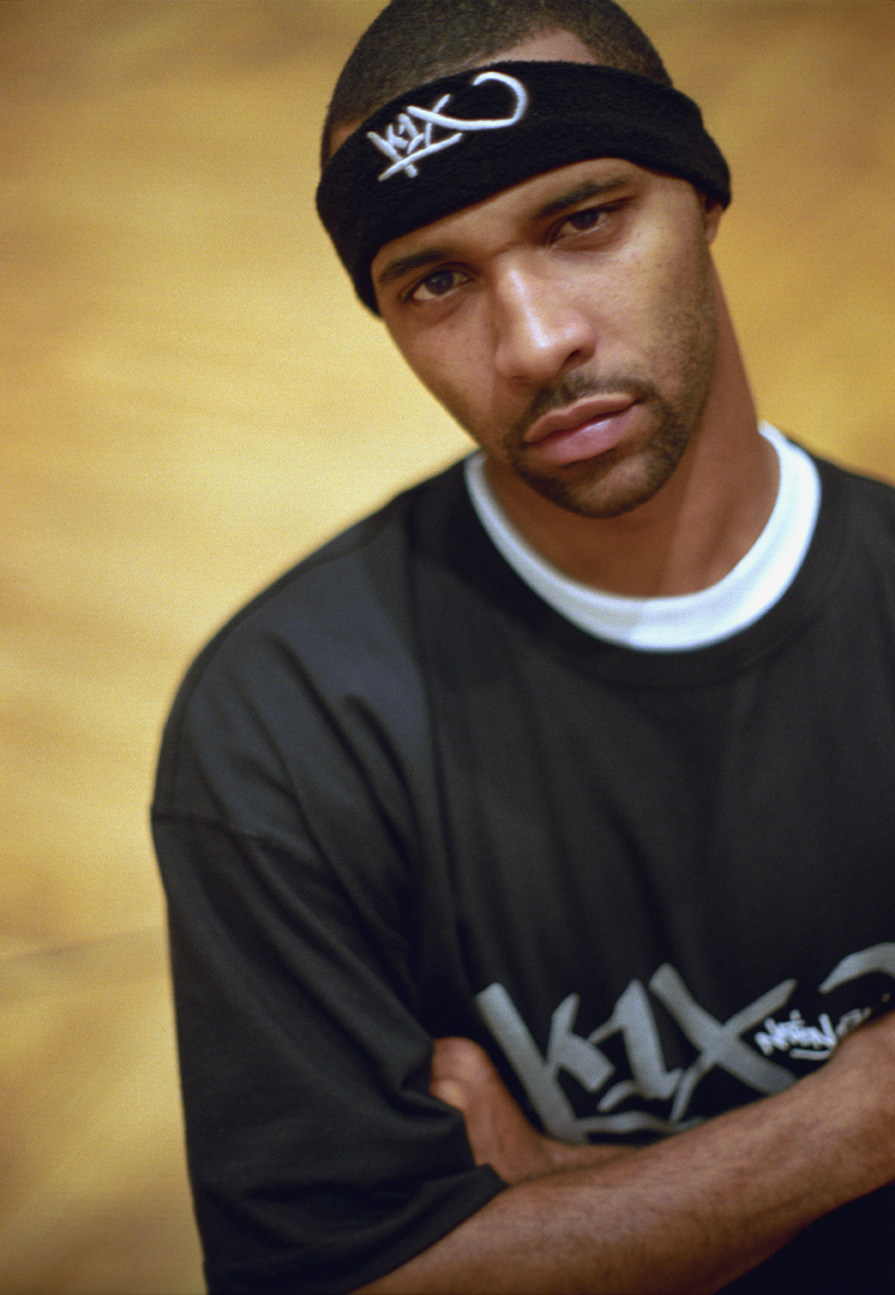
Budden in 2003

Budden quickly became a mixtape fixture, and secured a major deal with Def Jam Recordings in 2002. He first gained attention through the promotional single "Focus", which spent seventeen weeks on the U.S. Billboard Hot R&B/Hip-Hop Songs chart, peaking at No. 43.

On May 8, 2003, Budden released "Pump It Up" as the lead single for his upcoming album. The song, produced by Just Blaze, was a commercial success, charting at No. 16 on the U.S. Billboard Hot R&B/Hip-Hop Songs, as well as its Hot R&B/Hip-Hop Airplay chart at No. 18. The song peaked at No. 38 on the U.S. Billboard Hot 100 chart, No. 10 on the Hot Rap Songs chart, and No. 39 on the Radio Songs chart. The song was also featured on soundtracks for the hit films 2 Fast 2 Furious (2003) and You Got Served (2004), as well as the video game Madden NFL 2004. Def Jam Vendetta, Def Jam: Fight for NY, and Def Jam Fight for NY: The Takeover where Budden appeared as a playable character. The song received a Grammy Award nomination for the Best Male Rap Solo Performance at the 46th Annual Grammy Awards.

On June 10, 2003, Budden released his eponymous debut studio album Joe Budden. It debuted at No. 8 on the U.S. Billboard 200, selling 95,000 units in its first week, and going on to sell over 420,000 copies in the United States. Its second single, "Fire (Yes, Yes Y'all)", featuring guest vocals by American rapper Busta Rhymes, peaked at No. 18 on the U.S. Billboard Hot R&B/Hip-Hop Airplay chart and No. 48 on the Hot R&B/Hip-Hop Songs chart. Budden made a remix featuring Paul Cain and Fabolous, which appeared on the latter's mixtape, titled More Street Dreams, Pt. 2: The Mixtape. In late 2003, Budden guest performed on the R. Kelly-produced single, "Clubbin" by Marques Houston, which peaked at No. 39 on the Billboard Hot 100.

=== Label issues, Mood Muzik series (2003–2008) ===
While on Def Jam, Budden released two mixtapes, Mood Muzik: The Worst of Joe Budden on December 9, 2003, and Mood Muzik 2: Can It Get Any Worse? on December 26, 2005. Both were critically acclaimed with Complex retrospectively naming Mood Muzik 2 as one of the best mixtapes of all time. Around this time, Joe Budden also began recording his intended second album, The Growth. Originally scheduled for a June 21, 2005 release, The Growth suffered continuous delays, due to disagreements between Joe and Def Jam executives over the direction of the album. On May 25, 2005, Joe released "Gangsta Party" featuring Nate Dogg as the album's first single. The Growth was eventually shelved and Budden was released from Def Jam in October 2007.

In December 2007, Budden signed a multi-album deal with independent distributor Amalgam Digital, His first release on the label was Mood Muzik 3: The Album on February 26, 2008, a retailed version of his mixtape Mood Muzik 3: For Better or for Worse, released previously on December 15, 2007. Although it sold poorly, the album received universal acclaim from critics, who praised Budden's willingness to discuss personal issues.

=== Halfway House, Slaughterhouse, Padded Room, Escape Route (2008–2012) ===
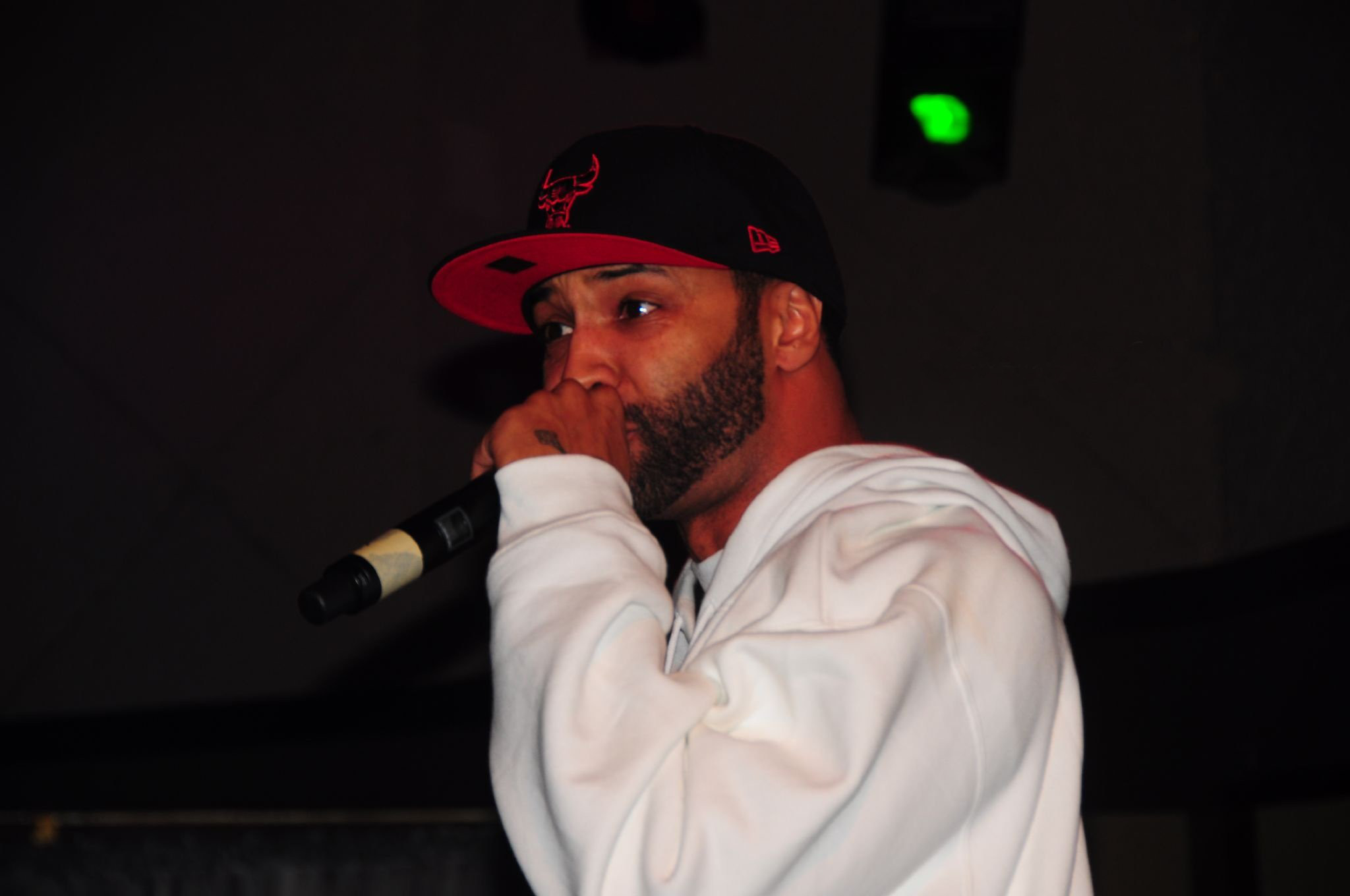
Budden performing in 2010

On October 28, 2008, Budden released his third studio album, Halfway House, exclusively in digital format. It was the first in a series of connected albums. Its release marked Budden's first return to the Billboard 200 in five years, with approximately 3,000 downloads sold in its first week of release. The album featured "Slaughterhouse", the first collaboration between Budden, Crooked I, Royce da 5'9" and Joell Ortiz. The song's positive reception inspired the four to form a group, naming themselves Slaughterhouse after the song.

After an initial delay, Budden's fourth album, Padded Room was released on February 24, 2009, debuting at No. 42 on the U.S. Billboard 200 chart and No. 2 on the Top Independent Albums chart, with 13,451 copies sold in the first week of release. Budden's fifth album, Escape Route, followed on August 11, 2009, and met with positive reception from critics. The same day, Slaughterhouse released their self-titled debut album, Slaughterhouse, through E1. On October 26, 2010, Budden released Mood Muzik 4: A Turn 4 the Worst.

Slaughterhouse planned a second album for release in 2010, tentatively titled No Muzzle. However, Royce da 5'9" confirmed talks between the group and Eminem's Shady Records, and felt their second album should be released on a major label. After some complications with E1 and Amalgam, Slaughterhouse officially signed a deal with Shady Records on January 12, 2011. On February 8, 2011, Slaughterhouse released a self-titled extended play.

On August 28, 2012, Slaughterhouse released their second studio album Welcome to: Our House, which debut at No. 2 on the Billboard 200 and No. 1 on the Billboard Top Rap Albums, selling 52,000 copies its first week. It was preceded by the mixtape, On The House, which was released on August 19, 2012.

=== No Love Lost, All Love Lost, Rage & The Machine (2013–2016) ===
On October 16, 2012, Budden released "She Don't Put It Down", featuring Lil Wayne and Tank. The song was the lead single from his upcoming sixth studio album. It debut at No. 96 on the Billboard Hot 100, marking Budden's first appearance on the chart in nearly ten years since his 2003 hit single "Pump It Up".

In January 2013, Budden joined the cast of VH1's Love & Hip Hop: New York in season three. He would return for its fourth season later that year.

On February 5, 2013, Budden released No Love Lost, which debut at No. 15 on the Billboard 200 selling 30,000 copies in its first week. By March 20, 2013, the album had sold 60,000 copies. It was preceded by the mixtape A Loose Quarter, which was released on November 20, 2012. On March 26, 2013, Budden released the album's second single, "N.B.A. (Never Broke Again)", featuring Wiz Khalifa and French Montana.

On July 12, 2014, Budden participated in Total Slaughter, a rap battle event opposing Hollow Da Don, a top rap battler and influencer in battle rap. Judges awarded victory to Hollow through unanimous decision.

In February 2015, Budden began releasing a weekly podcast with Rory Farrell and Marisa Mendez, then known as I'll Name This Podcast Later. On October 16, 2015, Budden released his seventh studio album, All Love Lost, to universal acclaim from critics. It was preceded by the extended play, Some Love Lost, on November 4, 2014, and the singles "Broke" and "Slaughtermouse".

Budden announced his last solo tour dates on May 16, 2016. On July 2, 2016, Budden released a diss track, "Making A Murderer Part I", primarily aimed at Canadian rapper Drake, although he also takes shots at Meek Mill in the song. He later explained that the diss was not personal, done for the competition and sport, and that he has no gripe with either artist. In the aftermath of the feud, Mendez was replaced on Budden's podcast by Jamil "Mal" Clay, after which the show became known as The Joe Budden Podcast.

On October 21, 2016, Budden released his eighth and final solo album, Rage & The Machine, produced entirely by AraabMUZIK. The album debuted at No. 40 on the Billboard 200, selling 11,341 copies in the United States.

=== Broadcasting career (2017–present) ===
On April 17, 2017, Budden began co-hosting Everyday Struggle, a daily morning show for Complex, with DJ Akademiks and Nadeska Alexis. On June 25, 2017, during the BET Awards pre-show, Budden and his co-hosts conducted an interview with Atlanta rap group Migos, where tensions rose between Budden and Migos member Takeoff after DJ Akademiks questioned his absence on Migos' 2016 hit single Bad and Boujee. Budden walked off set and a momentary standoff occurred between himself and the group. Migos member Quavo referred to Joe Budden in the song "Ice Tray", saying "If a nigga hatin' call him Joe Budden". Budden left the show in December 2017.

On May 14, 2018, Budden announced a partnership with Sean Combs and his media company Revolt, creating and producing the talk show State of the Culture, which premiered on September 10, 2018. Budden would co-host with rapper and fellow Love & Hip Hop co-star Remy Ma. During the summer of 2018, The Joe Budden Podcast began touring, with live performances through the United States. During this time, he officially announced that he was retiring from rapping. In August 2018, Budden signed a deal to bring his podcast to Spotify and expand the show to a bi-weekly schedule, with new episodes every Wednesday and Saturday. On August 27, 2020, Budden announced he was leaving Spotify at the end of his contract over a financial disagreement with the streaming service.

In November 2018, Budden returned to Love & Hip Hop: New York in season nine. The next year, he returned for the show's tenth anniversary season.

On February 3, 2021, Budden announced that he was no longer with Spotify and is bringing exclusive content from his podcast to crowdfunding service Patreon. He also announced that he would be joining Patreon's board as Creator Equity Advisor with the goal to address "everything that's wrong with the monetization system for creators."

== Personal life ==
Budden has two children. His oldest son was born in 2001. In 2010, a warrant for Budden was issued by the Hudson County, New Jersey Sheriff's Office for unpaid child support. His second son was born in 2017 to the video vixen Cyn Santana. The couple became engaged in December 2018, after Budden proposed during a live episode of The Joe Budden Podcast in New York. The couple has since called off their engagement. Budden has been in a relationship with girlfriend Shadee Monique since 2019.

On March 30, 2012, Budden spent a night in jail and missed a Slaughterhouse concert in his hometown over a $75 parking ticket.

In 2014, Budden turned himself in to police following allegations he assaulted his girlfriend and stole her cell phone, and appeared in Manhattan Criminal Court on charges of assault, grand larceny and robbery. A judge later dismissed all charges.

Budden has admitted to having an addiction to PCP and later MDMA, but has been off drugs and publicly spoken out against their use.

=== Views ===
Budden has received attention for his outspoken views on certain artists in the music industry. In 2010, he feuded with Lil B on Twitter, prompting Lil B to release the diss track "T-Shirts and Buddens". In an interview with Lil Yachty on Everyday Struggle, he criticized the artist directly regarding his approach to music. In 2023, he was involved in a feud with Drake (which had been ongoing since 2016) and YoungBoy Never Broke Again, as he expressed distaste for both artists. Both of them in turn reprimanded Budden, referring to him as a "failed musical artist" and various pejoratives, respectively.

== Discography ==
Studio albums

- Joe Budden (2003)
- Mood Muzik 3: The Album (2008)
- Halfway House (2008)
- Padded Room (2009)
- Escape Route (2009)
- No Love Lost (2013)
- All Love Lost (2015)
- Rage & The Machine (2016)

Collaborative albums

- Slaughterhouse (with Slaughterhouse) (2009)
- Welcome to: Our House (with Slaughterhouse) (2012)

== Filmography ==
=== Film ===
Year	Title	Role	Notes
2003	Hip Hop Babylon	Himself	Documentary
2012	Something from Nothing: The Art of Rap	Himself	Documentary
2013	Can't Forget New Jersey	Himself	Documentary

=== Television ===
Year	Title	Role	Notes
2013–2014; 2018–2020	Love & Hip Hop: New York	Himself	Supporting cast (seasons 3–4); Main cast (seasons 9–10)
2015	Couples Therapy	Himself	Main cast (season 6)
2018–2020	State of the Culture	Himself	Host, creator and executive producer
2026	Law & Order	Big Switty	Episode: "Property"

=== Video games ===
Year	Title	Role	Notes
2003	Def Jam Vendetta	Himself	Voice
2004	Def Jam: Fight for NY	Himself	Voice
2006	Def Jam Fight for NY: The Takeover	Himself	Voice
