= Amalgam Digital =

American independent record label

- Founded: 2006
- Founder: Anyextee
- Distributor: Amalgam Entertainment
- Genre: Hip hop
- Country of origin: U.S.
- Location: East Boston, Massachusetts

Amalgam Digital is an independent record label based in East Boston, Massachusetts. Founded in 2006 by Anyextee, the privately owned label had been home to a variety of artists throughout the decade before significantly downsizing in its later years. The label's online store was the first genre-specific digital download store specializing in hip hop music. It focuses on independent labels and artists through the implementation of a new user-generated content module that allowed artists to upload content directly to the site for immediate purchase. Amalgam Digital also houses an exclusive independent record label by the same name, specializing in hip hop music and distribution. In an April 2008 issue, The Source proclaimed that Amalgam Digital has "its finger on the pulse of hip-hop's future."

== History ==
Based in East Boston, the Amalgam Digital label is distributed exclusively by Amalgam Entertainment LLC, a distribution company that offers management, marketing, and promotional services. As an independent label, Amalgam Digital been home to such artists as Max B, Saigon, Curren$y, Chuuwee, Joe Budden, Peedi Crakk, Tash, Kurious, Juggaknots, Tame One, and Lil B.

Joe Budden's album released by the label, Padded Room, reached #42 in the Billboard 200 chart and #21 in the Billboard R&B/Hip-Hop Albums chart in March 2009. Since August 2009, releases by Saigon and Joe Budden are made in partnership with E1 Music. BET named Joe Budden's Padded Room and Saigon's All in a Day’s Work as the #2 and #3 best independent albums of 2009, respectively.

In late 2012, Brooklyn-based artist Dillon Cooper teamed up Amalgam Digital with plans to release his first official mixtape in June 2013.

== Online store ==
Founded in 2007, the AmalgamDigital.com store made promotional, distributional, and public relations services available to aspiring independent artists who registered as vendors at AmalgamDigital.com. This also enabled them to sell music, videos, podcasts, and other material through the online store. On August 21, 2008, AmalgamDigital.com launched its first Amalgam TV live webcast, which featured Joe Budden's last studio session for his sophomore LP on Amalgam Digital, Padded Room. Over 80,000 visitors viewed the webcast, throughout which Budden interacted with fans and answered questions in real time via a live chat room.
