= Slaughterhouse discography =

- Studio albums: 2
- Extended plays: 1
- Singles: 9
- Music videos: 9

This is the discography of rap group Slaughterhouse composed of rappers Royce da 5'9", Joe Budden, Joell Ortiz, and Crooked I. It consists of 2 studio albums, 9 singles, 1 extended play, 2 mixtapes and 9 music videos.

Slaughterhouse's debut studio album, Slaughterhouse, was released on August 11, 2009 on E1 Music. It peaked at number 25 on the US Billboard 200.

The second studio album and major label debut, Welcome to: Our House, was released on August 28, 2012 on Shady Records and peaked at number two on the Billboard 200. The album's second single, "My Life", peaked at number 8 on the US Bubbling Under Hot 100 Singles and peaked at number 87 on Canadian Hot 100. "Throw That", the album's fourth single, peaked at number 98 on the US Billboard Hot 100 and peaked at number 69 on Canadian Hot 100. "Goodbye" and "Throw It Away," however, did not chart.

== Albums ==
=== Studio albums ===
List of studio albums, with selected chart positions and sales figures
Title	Album details	Peak chart positions							Sales
Title	Album details	US	US R&B/ HH	US Rap	CAN	NL	SWI	UK	Sales
Slaughterhouse	Released: August 11, 2009; Label: E1 Music; Format: CD, digital download	25	4	2	—	—	—	—	US: 74,000
Welcome to: Our House	Released: August 28, 2012; Label: Shady, Interscope; Format: CD, digital download	2	1	1	4	90	76	33	US: 200,000

=== Compilation albums ===
List of albums, with selected chart positions, sales figures and certifications
Title	Album details	Peak chart positions								Sales	Certifications
Title	Album details	US	US R&B/ HH	US Rap	BEL (FL)	CAN	GER	SWI	UK	Sales	Certifications
Shady XV	Released: November 24, 2014; Label: Shady, Interscope; Format: CD, LP, digital download	3	1	1	26	1	8	7	5	US: 290,000; CAN: 21,000	RIAA: Gold
"—" denotes a recording that did not chart or was not released in that territory.

== Extended plays ==
List of extended plays, with selected chart positions and sales figures
Title	EP details	Peak chart positions			Sales
Title	EP details	US	US R&B/ HH	US Rap	Sales
Slaughterhouse	Released: February 8, 2011; Label: E1 Music; Format: CD, digital download	147	29	13	US: 15,198
"—" denotes a recording that did not chart or was not released in that territory.

== Mixtapes ==
Title	Mixtape details
On the House	Released: August 19, 2012; Label: Self-released; Format: Digital download
House Rules	Released: May 21, 2014; Label: Self-released; Format: Digital download

== Singles ==
=== As lead artist ===
List of singles, with selected chart positions, showing year released and album name
Title	Year	Peak chart positions		Album
Title	Year	US	CAN	Album
"The One" (featuring The New Royales)	2009	—	—	Slaughterhouse
"Microphone"	2009	—	—	Slaughterhouse
"Hammer Dance"	2012	—	—	Welcome to: Our House
"My Life" (featuring CeeLo Green)	2012	108	87	Welcome to: Our House
"Throw It Away" (featuring Swizz Beatz)	2012	—	—	Welcome to: Our House
"Goodbye"	2012	—	—	Welcome to: Our House
"Throw That" (featuring Eminem)	2012	98	69	Welcome to: Our House
"Y'all Ready Know"	2014	—	—	Shady XV
"R.N.S."	2015	—	—	Southpaw (soundtrack)
"—" denotes a recording that did not chart or was not released in that territory.

== Guest appearances ==
List of non-single guest appearances, with other performing artists, showing year released and album name
Title	Year	Other artist(s)	Album
"Slaughterhouse"	2008	Joe Budden, Nino Bless	Halfway House
"Move On (Slaughterhouse Remix)"	2008	Joell Ortiz	—N/a
"Woodstock (Hood Hop)"	2009	Kxng Crooked, M.O.P.	Mr. Pigface Weapon Waist
"The Warriors"	2009	Royce da 5'9"	Street Hop
"We Outta Here"	2009	Joe Budden	Escape Route
"On My Grind"	2009	Joey 6'1"	—N/a
"Money on the Floor (Remix)"	2009	Corte Ellis	—N/a
"Beamer, Benz or Bentley (Shady Mega Mix)"	2010	Royce da 5'9"	The Bar Exam 3
"Session One"	2010	Eminem	Recovery
"2.0 Boys"	2011	Eminem, Yelawolf	—N/a
"F5 (Furiously Dangerous)"	2011	Ludacris, Claret Jai	Fast Five (soundtrack)
"Loud Noises"	2011	Bad Meets Evil	Hell: The Sequel
"Hard White (Up in the Club) (Remix)"	2011	Yelawolf, T.I.	—N/a
"Devil's Got a Hold"	2011	Travis Barker	Give the Drummer Some
"Monsters in My Head"	2012	Crooked I, Colin Munroe	Psalm 82:V6
"House Gang"	2013	Funkmaster Flex	Who You Mad At? Me or Yourself?
"Brothers Keeper"	2014	Joell Ortiz	House Slippers
"Microphone Preem"	2014	PRhyme	PRhyme
"Chopping Block"	2017	Royce da 5'9"	The Bar Exam 4
"Revenge"	2019	Cryptik Soul, The Styles of L	Killer's Blood

== Music videos ==
Year	Title	Director	Artist(s)
As main performer
2009	"Move On"	John Colombo	
2009	"The One"	Rik Cordero	featuring The New Royales
2009	"Microphone"	John Colombo	
2012	"Hammer Dance"		
2012	"My Life"	Syndrome	featuring Cee Lo Green
2012	"Throw It Away"	Syndrome	featuring Swizz Beatz
2012	"Goodbye"	Rik Cordero	
2014	"Y'all Ready Know"		
2015	"R.N.S."	Shomi Patwary	
Cameo appearances
2009	"Forever"	Hype Williams	Drake featuring Kanye West, Lil Wayne and Eminem
2013	"Berzerk"	Syndrome	Eminem

== See also ==
- Royce da 5'9" discography
- Joe Budden discography
- Joell Ortiz discography
- Crooked I discography
