= Kxng Crooked discography =

American hip hop musician discography

KXNG Crooked discography
- Studio albums: 4
- EPs: 11
- Compilation albums: 3
- Mixtapes: 19
- Collaboration albums: 7

This is the discography for American rapper KXNG Crooked.

== Albums ==
=== Studio albums ===
List of studio albums, with selected chart positions
Title	Album details	Peak chart positions		
Title	Album details	US	US R&B	US Rap
Apex Predator	Released: July 30, 2013; Label: Treacherous C.O.B., Empire; Formats: CD, digital download	—	33	—
Sex, Money and Hip-Hop	Released: December 16, 2014; Label: Treacherous C.O.B., SMH; Formats: CD, digital download	—	—	—
Good vs. Evil	Released: November 11, 2016; Label: RBC, E1 Music; Formats: CD, digital download	—	—	—
Good vs. Evil II: The Red Empire	Released: December 8, 2017; Label: C.O.B. LLC, Empire; Formats: CD, digital download	—	—	—
West Coast '96	Released: October 16, 2026; Label: Hitmaker; Formats: CD, digital download	—	—	—
"—" denotes a title that did not chart, or was not released in that territory.

=== Collaborative albums ===
List of collaboration albums, with selected chart positions
Title	Album details	Peak chart positions		
Title	Album details	US	US R&B	US Rap
Slaughterhouse (with Slaughterhouse)	Released: August 11, 2009; Label: E1 Music; Formats: CD, digital download	25	4	2
Welcome to: Our House (with Slaughterhouse)	Released: August 28, 2012; Label: Shady, Interscope; Formats: CD, digital download	2	1	1
Statik Kxng (with Statik Selektah)	Released: February 12, 2016; Label: Showoff, Penalty; Formats: CD, digital download	—	—	—
Gravitas (with Bronze Nazareth)	Released: December 13, 2019; Label: Holy Toledo Productions; Formats: CD, digital download	—	—	—
H.A.R.D. (with Joell Ortiz)	Released: May 29, 2020; Label: Mello; Format: CD, LP, digital download	—	—	—
Rise & Fall of Slaughterhouse (with Joell Ortiz)	Released: March 11, 2022; Label: Hitmaker Music Group, Hitmaker Distribution; Format: CD, LP, digital download	152	—	—
Harbor City Season One (with Joell Ortiz)	Released: September 16, 2022; Label: Hitmaker Music Group, Hitmaker Distribution; Format: CD, LP, digital download	—	—	—
Prosper (with Joell Ortiz)	Released: October 20, 2023; Label: Hitmaker Music Group; Format: CD, LP, digital download	—	—	—
Tapestry (with Joell Ortiz)	Released: June 28, 2024; Label: Hitmaker Music Group; Format: CD, LP, digital download	—	—	—
"—" denotes a title that did not chart, or was not released in that territory.

=== Compilation albums ===
List of compilation albums
Title	Album details
Hood Star	Released: June 15, 2010; Label: WIDEawake, Death Row; Formats: CD, digital download
Planet C.O.B. Vol. 2	Released: July 12, 2011; Label: C.O.B., Miso Digital; Formats: CD, digital download
The Long Beach Crook Playlist	Released: September 27, 2016; Label: Drink the Lemonade; Formats: CD, digital download

== Extended plays ==
List of extended plays, with selected chart positions and certifications
Title	EP details	Peak chart positions		
Title	EP details	US	US R&B	US Rap
Block Obama II	Released: November 4, 2008; Label: Treacherous; Format: Digital download	—	—	—
Mr. Pigface Weapon Waist	Released: November 10, 2009; Label: C.O.B.; Format: Digital download	—	—	—
Planet C.O.B. Vol. 1	Released: August 18, 2010; Label: C.O.B.; Format: Digital download	—	—	—
Slaughterhouse (with Slaughterhouse)	Released: February 8, 2011; Label: E1 Music; Format: Digital download	—	—	—
Million Dollar $tory	Released: November 29, 2011; Label: C.O.B.; Format: Digital download	—	—	—
In None We Trust	Released: December 13, 2011; Label: C.O.B.; Format: Digital download	—	—	—
Valley of the KXNGS	Released: October 28, 2016; Label: RBC; Format: Digital download	—	—	—
Kxngs Wear Gold (with Frost Gamble)	Released: September 28, 2018; Label: Hitmaker Services, New Wave Distro; Format: Digital download	—	—	—
Menace II Sobriety	Released: July 26, 2019; Label: Hitmaker Services, New Wave Distro; Format: Digital download	—	—	—
The Sixteen Chapel	Released: March 6, 2020; Label: Hitmaker Services, New Wave Distro; Format: Digital download	—	—	—
Flag	Released: October 23, 2020; Label: Hitmaker Services; Format: Digital download	—	—	—
Dear California	Released: January 1, 2023; Label: COB, Hitmaker Distribution; Format: Digital download	—	—	—
JFKLAX (with Joell Ortiz)	Released: February 24, 2023; Label: Hitmaker Distribution; Format: Digital download	—	—	—
Crooked Investments (with WestCoast Gillie)	Released: November 15, 2024; Label: We Create Greatness; Format: Digital download	—	—	—
Crooked Justice (with Sullee J)	Released: May 13, 2026; Label: Self-released; Format: Digital download	—	—	—
"—" denotes a title that did not chart, or was not released in that territory.

== Mixtapes ==
List of mixtapes, with year released
Title	Mixtape details
Taking over the West	Released: 2002; Label: Self-released; Format: Digital download
Westcoasanostra Volume One	Released: 2003; Label: Self-released; Format: Digital download
The Young Boss Vol.1	Released: 2004; Label: Self-released; Format: Digital download
The Young Boss Vol.2	Released: 2006; Label: Self-released; Format: Digital download
Hip-Hop Weekly Vol. 1	Released: 2007; Label: Self-released; Format: Digital download
Hip-Hop Weekly Vol. 2	Released: 2007; Label: Self-released; Format: Digital download
Hip-Hop Weekly Vol. 3	Released: 2007; Label: Self-released; Format: Digital download
St. Valentine's Day Bossacre	Released: 2008; Label: Self-released; Format: Digital download
The Block Obama: Hood Politics	Released: 2008; Label: Self-released; Format: Digital download
Westcoasanostra Volume Two	Released: 2010; Label: Death Row; Format: Digital download
Intrigo	Released: 2011; Label: Self-released; Format: Digital download
Psalm 82:V6	Released: 19 June, 2012; Label: Self-released; Format: Digital download
On the House (with Slaughterhouse)	Released: August 19, 2012; Label: Shady; Format: CD, Digital download
House Rules (with Slaughterhouse)	Released: May 21, 2014; Label: Shady; Format: CD, Digital download
The Weeklys, Vol. 1	Released: March 11, 2019; Label: Hitmaker Services, New Wave Distro; Format: Digital download
The Weeklys, Vol. 2	Released: May 21, 2019; Label: Hitmaker Services, New Wave Distro; Format: Digital download
The Weeklys, Vol. 3	Released: August 9, 2019; Label: Hitmaker Services, New Wave Distro; Format: Digital download
The Weeklys, Vol. 4	Released: October 11, 2019; Label: Hitmaker Services, New Wave Distro; Format: Digital download
The Weeklys, Vol. 5	Released: November 29, 2019; Label: Hitmaker Services, New Wave Distro; Format: Digital download

== Guest appearances ==
List of non-single guest appearances, with other performing artists, showing year released and album name
Title	Year	Other artist(s)	Album
"G's Come Out At Night"	1996	Low Life Gangstas	Big C-Style Presents
"Every Day (DJ Battlecat Remix)"	1997	MQ3	Every Day 12"
"Feels So Good"	1998	Eastsiders, Snoop Doggy Dogg	Ride (soundtrack)
"Girl"	1998	Luniz	Caught Up (soundtrack)
"Poor Man Cry"	1998	Barrington Levy, Snoop Dogg, Daz, Soopafly	Living Dangerously
"Underground Tactics"	1999	Sway & King Tech, Planet Asia, Heltah Skeltah	This or That
"Uh-Oh"	1999	Silva Satin	Escape from Death Row
"I Ain't Shit Without My Homeboyz"	1999	Kurupt, Daz Dillinger, Soopafly, Baby S	Tha Streetz Iz a Mutha
"Step Up"	1999	Kurupt, Xzibit, Daz Dillinger	Tha Streetz Iz a Mutha
"Can I Gitt Bucc"	2001	Soopafly, Daz	Dat Whoopty Woop
"Let Me Live"	2002	Left Eye	N.I.N.A. (unreleased)
"Universal Quest"	2002	Left Eye	N.I.N.A. (unreleased)
"The Nexx Niggaz"	2002	Black Child, Caddillac Tah, Chink Santana, Dave Bing, Eastwood, Ronnie Bumps	Irv Gotti Presents: The Inc.
"Baby (Remix)"	2002	Ashanti	Irv Gotti Presents: The Remixes
"Connected"	2002	Ja Rule, Eastwood	The Last Temptation
"2 of Amerikaz Most Wanted (Nu-Mixx)"	2003	2Pac	Nu-Mixx Klazzics
"Take Yo Fade"	2003	Boo-Yaa T.R.I.B.E., Kokane, Eastwood	West Koasta Nostra
"We Pop (West Coast Remix)"	2003	RZA, E-40, Jayo Felony, Method Man, WC	Westsideee! Vol. 3
"Kalifornia G'z"	2004	The Game, Jim Jones	You Know What It Is, Vol. 2: Throwin' Rocks at the Throne
"Watch What You Do"	2004	Sway & King Tech	Back 2 Basics
"I Love the Ghetto"	2004	Sway & King Tech	Back 2 Basics
"Hit the Deck"	2004	Sway & King Tech, Tracy Lane	Back 2 Basics
"We Run the Streets"	2005	Ras Kass, Spider Loc, 40 Glocc, El Dog, Cali Casino	Institutionalized
"It's Okay (One Blood) (West Coast Remix)"	2006	The Game, E-40, Glasses Malone, Snoop Dogg, Tha Dogg Pound, WC	It's Okay (One Blood) (Regional Remixes CDS)
"Lick Shots"	2008	Immortal Technique, Chino XL	The 3rd World
"Wake the Game Up"	2008	Yukmouth	Million Dollar Mouthpiece
"Elevate"	2008	Ras Kass, Odious	Institutionalized Vol. 2
"Funky Piano"	2008	DJ Revolution, Bishop Lamont	King of the Decks
"Judge"	2008	Cashis, Young De, Royce da 5'9"	Global Warning 3
"Clear the Room"	2008	Cashis, Young De, Royce da 5'9"	Homeland Security
"I'm a Gangsta"	2009	Yukmouth, Dyson, Ray J	The West Coast Don
"That'z Juss Lyfe"	2009	Tha Realest, Val Young	Witness tha Realest
"Not What You Think"	2009	Smoothvega, Royce da 5'9", Sinful	3.10.85
"Acts of Violence"	2009	The Alchemist	Chemical Warfare
"One Hit Away"	2009	BQ, XL Middleton	Travolta
"Gun Harmonizing"	2009	Royce da 5'9"	Street Hop
"From the Blood Pumper"	2009	DieNasty Records, Kalibur, Tank	The Live Sick Compilation
"Sickology 101"	2009	Tech N9ne, Chino XL	Sickology 101
"Weapons"	2009	Rhyme Addicts	Showtime
"Fill Up"	2009	Spider Loc, Mike Knox	—N/a
"Everything"	2009	Chamillionaire	Mixtape Messiah 6
"Show n Prove"	2009	Undergods	Canibus & Keith Murray are the Undergods
"Father Forgive Them"	2010	Mark Morrison, Beenie Man	I Am What I Am
"These Skillz"	2010	Ben Reilly	Section 8: Memoirs of an Everyday Hustle
"So Many"	2010	Young Buck, D Eazy	—N/a
"Event Horizon"	2010	Rhyme Asylum	Solitary Confinement
"We Nah Play"	2010	Snowgoons, Banish, Beenie Man	Kraftwerk
"On Fire"	2010	Royce da 5'9	Bar Exam 3
"Nobody Fucking with Us"	2010	Royce da 5'9, Bun B, Joe Budden	Bar Exam 3
"Sober Up"	2010	Joe Budden	Mood Muzik 4: A Turn 4 the Worst
"Take My City"	2011	DJ Drama, B.o.B	Third Power
"4 Corner Vision"	2011	Praverb the Wyse, A.L. Laureate, Cayoz Da Beast	The Brainstormers EP
"Enemies"	2012	Gudda Gudda, Ace Hood, Trae Tha Truth	Guddaville 3
"Movies"	2012	Xzibit, Game, Slim the Mobster, Demrick	Napalm
"Make It Out Alive"		1982 (Statik /& Termanology)	2012
"The Watchmen"	2013	Nino Bless, Cambatta, Styles P	Smoke n Mirrors
"Skeletons"	2013	Joe Budden, Joell Ortiz	No Love Lost
"The Year of the Underdogz"	2013	Young Noble, Gage Gully	The Year of the Underdogz
"Adrenaline"	2013	Wrekonize	The War Within
"Cypher of Bosses"	2013	Horseshoe Gang, Techniec, Infinity, Gems, Jerzy J, Elz, Pac Ten, Iceman, Karelezz, One-2, Dizaster	R&B (Rap & Bitches)
"Ain't Worried About Nothin'" (Skee-mix)	2013	French Montana, Dizzy Wright, Problem, Game	—N/a
"Ima Hustla"	2013	Cashis, Sullee J	The County Hound 2
"Ima Hustla" (Remix)	2013	Cashis, Mistah F.A.B., Roccett, Goldie Gold	The County Hound 2
"Slaughter Session"	2013	Tony Touch, Joell Ortiz, Royce da 5'9"	The Piece Maker 3: Return of the 50 MC's
"Down Like This"	2014	Statik Selektah, Sheek Louch, Pharoahe Monch	What Goes Around
"2Morrow"	2014	Mark Morrison, Erene, Devlin	—N/a
"Devil in My Room"	2014	Joe Budden	—N/a
"The Mirror"	2014	Pink Grenade	Fear of a Pink Planet
"Imurder"	2015	DaWreck	—N/a
"Beast (Southpaw Remix)"	2015	Rob Bailey & The Hustle Standard, Busta Rhymes, Tech N9ne	Southpaw: Original Motion Picture Soundtrack
"Tax Season"	2015	Chucky Workclothes	Tax Season
"Mind Your Own"	2015	Wax Wonder	—N/a
"Sky Is Ours"	2015	OnlyOne, Illmaculate	Only + Ill
"Lit"	2015	D12	The Devil's Night Mixtape
"Let's Get It"	2015	Heightz, Sloan Bone	—N/a
"Fearless"	2016	Lazarus	—N/a
"The Gods"	2016	Astray	—N/a
"Gouda (Remix)"	2016	Maffew Ragazino	—N/a
"Let's Go"	2016	Termanology	Cameo King III
"Pain"	2016	Young Stunna	—N/a
"Until I'm Gone"	2016	Hatch, Astray	—N/a
"Intro"	2016	Horseshoe Gang	Anti-Trap Music
"Understand Me"	2016	It's Different, Forever M.C.	—N/a
"Thee Cvpher"	2016	Anonymous, Bones, DABeats	—N/a
"Let's Go (Part 2)"	2016	Termanology	More Politics
"To the Good Life"	2016	J Almighty	Aux Cord Porn EP
"Sunlight"	2016	The Ruckus, Demetrius Capone	—N/a
"Feel Good Music"	2017	B. Starr	—N/a
"Split Paths"	2017	Iliana Eve, DJ Hannahbella	Daddy Issues
"Starshine"	2017	Accent, King Deco	The Last Lyricist
"I Feel So Alive (Remix)"	2017	Centric, Kid Vishis, Christ Ray	—N/a
"Crooked Justice"	2017	Sullee J	—N/a
"Gain"	2017	J.O Jetson	—N/a
"Magic"	2017	Lexini Blanco	Blancaveli
"Eviction Notice"	2017	Ayok, Lingo, The Jokerr	2K17: The Mixtape
"Deeper than Rap"	2017	R-Mean	Mean Mondays Mixtape, Vol. 1
"To the Top"	2017	Xpression	—N/a
"Dark Days"	2017	Bigg Z	The Wait Is Over
"Not That Bad"	2017	Forever M.C., Hi-Rez, Emilio Rojas	—N/a
"Checkmate"	2017	Saeed Majazi, Tabesh, Syras	—N/a
"They Don't Want It"	2017	Hypnotic	Tribute 2 da West
"Why Not"	2017	A Reall	—N/a
"A Party Going On"	2018	Smith and Hay	Jazz (deluxe edition)
"Age of Empires"	2018	Chris Webby	—N/a
"Bianca"	2018	Aneesa Badshaw, DJ Whoo Kid	The Whoodlum Ball
"Revenge"	2019	Cryptik Soul, The Styles Of L	Killer's Blood
"Raw"	2019	Brotha Lynch Hung	Torment EP
"I Will"	2020	Eminem, Royce da 5'9", Joell Ortiz	Music to Be Murdered By
"Stockholm Syndrome"	2020	Russ	CHOMP
"Tricked"	2020	Royce da 5'9"	The Allegory
"It's All the Same"	2021	Paki Dunn, D.V. Alias Khryst	Tahi
"I Want U 2 Make It"	2021	Arrested Development, Speech, Configa	For The FKN Love
