= Royce da 5'9" discography =

Hip hop recording artist discography

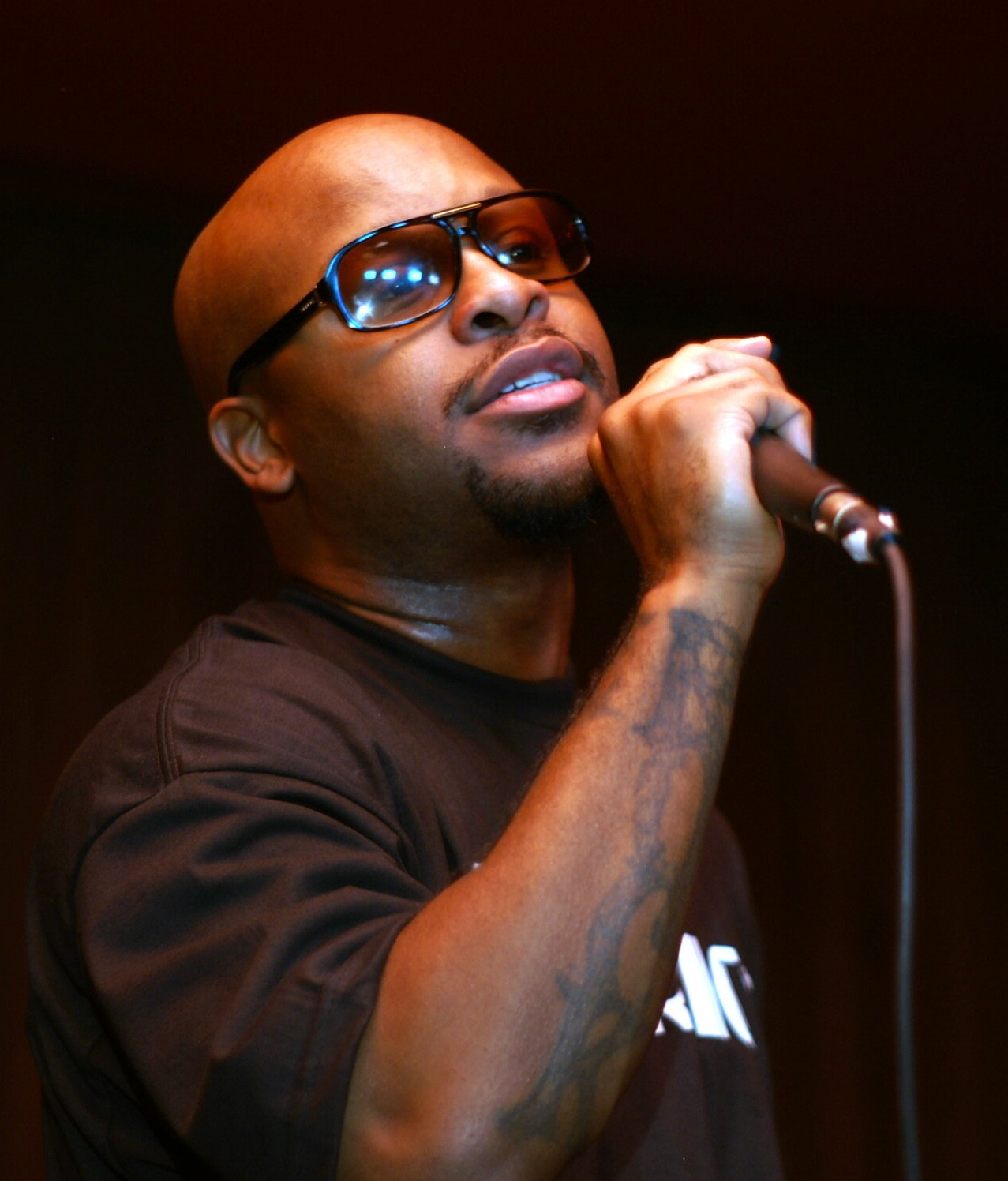
- Royce da 5'9" in 2008
- Studio albums: 8
- Singles: 30
- Music videos: 18
- Collaborative albums: 6
- Extended plays: 2
- Mixtapes: 11

The discography of American rapper Royce da 5'9" consists of 8 studio albums, 6 collaboration albums, 11 mixtapes and 30 solo singles, including 14 as a featured artist, and 18 music videos.

== Albums ==
=== Studio albums ===
List of studio albums, with selected chart positions
| Title | Album details | Peak chart positions | | | |
| Title | Album details | US | US Ind. | US R&B | US Rap |
|---|---|---|---|---|---|
| Rock City | Released: November 26, 2002; Label: E1, Game, Columbia; Format: CD, LP, cassette, digital download | — | 7 | 29 | — |
| Death Is Certain | Released: February 24, 2004; Label: E1; Format: CD, LP, cassette, digital download | 161 | 5 | 39 | — |
| Independent's Day | Released: June 28, 2005; Label: M.I.C.; Format: CD, digital download | — | — | — | — |
| Street Hop | Released: October 20, 2009; Label: M.I.C., One; Format: CD, digital download | 110 | 13 | 29 | 11 |
| Success Is Certain | Released: August 9, 2011; Label: Gracie Productions; Format: CD, digital download | 25 | 3 | 7 | 5 |
| Layers | Released: April 15, 2016; Label: Bad Half Entertainment; Format: CD, digital download | 22 | 4 | 1 | 2 |
| Book of Ryan | Released: May 4, 2018; Label: Heaven Studios, eOne; Format: CD, digital download | 24 | 3 | 14 | 12 |
| The Allegory | Released: February 21, 2020; Label: Heaven Studios, eOne; Format: CD, digital download | 58 | 6 | 32 | — |
"—" denotes the album failed to chart or not released

=== Collaborative albums ===
List of collaborative albums, with selected chart positions
| Title | Album details | Peak chart positions | | | Sales | Certifications |
| Title | Album details | US | US R&B | US Rap | Sales | Certifications |
|---|---|---|---|---|---|---|
| Slaughterhouse (with Slaughterhouse) | Released: August 11, 2009; Label: E1; Format: CD, digital download | 25 | 4 | 2 | US: 74,000 | |
| Hell: The Sequel (with Eminem as Bad Meets Evil) | Released: June 14, 2011; Label: Shady, Interscope; Format: CD, LP, digital download | 1 | 1 | 1 | US: 1,000,000 | RIAA: Gold; ARIA: Gold; BPI: Gold |
| Welcome to: Our House (with Slaughterhouse) | Released: August 28, 2012; Label: Shady, Interscope; Format: CD, digital download | 2 | 1 | 1 | US: 200,000 | |
| Shady XV (with Shady Records) | Released: November 24, 2014; Label: Shady, Interscope; Format: CD, LP, digital download | 3 | 1 | 1 | US: 290,000; CAN: 21,000 | RIAA: Gold; BPI: Silver |
| PRhyme (with DJ Premier) | Released: December 9, 2014; Label: PRhyme; Format: CD, LP, digital download | 59 | 7 | 3 | US: 18,263 | |
| PRhyme 2 (with DJ Premier) | Released: March 16, 2018; Label: PRhyme; Format: CD, LP, digital download | 40 | 23 | 19 | | |
"—" denotes a title that did not chart, or was not released in that territory.

=== Compilation albums ===
List of compilation albums, with year released
| Title | Album details |
|---|---|
| The Heaven Experience, Vol. 1 | Released: August 12, 2022; Label: Heaven Studios, eOne; Format: CD, digital download |

=== Mixtapes ===
List of mixtapes, with year released
| Title | Album details |
|---|---|
| The Rock City Mixtape (Hosted by Stretch Armstrong) | Released: 2001; Label: Self-released; Format: CD |
| Build & Destroy: The Lost Sessions, Pt. 1 | Released: July 29, 2003; Label: Trouble Records / Groove Attack; Format: CD, LP, digital download |
| M.I.C. (Make It Count) | Released: October 26, 2004; Label: Sure Shot Recordings; Format: CD, LP, digital download |
| The Bar Exam (with Statik Selektah and DJ Premier) | Released: 2007; Label: Self-released; Format: Digital download |
| The Bar Exam 2 (with DJ Green Lantern) | Released: September 15, 2008; Label: Self-released; Format: Digital download |
| The Bar Exam 3 (with DJ Whoo Kid) | Released: 2010; Label: Self-released; Format: Digital download |
| On the House (with Slaughterhouse) | Released: August 19, 2012; Label: Self-released; Format: Digital download |
| House Rules (with Slaughterhouse) | Released: May 21, 2014; Label: Self-released; Format: Digital download |
| Lost Files (with Nottz) | Released: January 20, 2015; Label: Self-released; Format: Digital download |
| Tabernacle: Trust the Shooter | Released: March 29, 2016; Label: Bad Half Entertainment; Format: Digital download |
| The Bar Exam 4 (Hosted by DJ Green Lantern) | Released: June 20, 2017; Label: Self-released; Format: Digital download |

== EPs ==
List of extended plays, with year released
| Title | EP details |
|---|---|
| The Revival EP | Released: July 7, 2009; Label: Self-released; Format: Digital download |
| The Heaven Experience EP | Released: March 31, 2023; Label: Heaven Studios, LLC; Format: Digital download |

== Singles ==
=== As lead artist ===
List of singles as lead artist, with selected chart positions, showing year released and album name
| Title | Year | Peak chart positions | | | | | | | | | Album |
| Title | Year | US Bub. | US R&B | US Rap | AUS | BEL | GER | NLD | SWE | UK | Album |
|---|---|---|---|---|---|---|---|---|---|---|---|
| "I'm the King" | 1999 | — | — | 46 | — | — | — | — | — | — | Grand Theft Auto III (soundtrack) |
| "Boom" | 2000 | — | 48 | 35 | 91 | — | — | — | — | — | Rock City |
| "You Can't Touch Me" | 2001 | — | 66 | — | — | — | — | — | — | — | Rock City |
| "Rock City" (featuring Eminem) | 2002 | — | 99 | — | — | 45 | 30 | 42 | 37 | — | Rock City |
| "Hip Hop" | 2003 | — | 98 | — | — | — | — | — | — | — | Death Is Certain |
| "Death Is Certain Pt. 2 (It Hurts)" (featuring Ingrid Smalls and Cha Cha) | 2004 | — | — | — | — | — | — | — | — | — | Death Is Certain |
| "Can't Nobody Stop Me", Also known as "No Way to Stop Me" (featuring Kid Vishis) | 2004 | — | — | — | — | — | — | — | — | — | NFL Street 2 (Soundtrack) |
| "Politics" (featuring Cee Lo Green) | 2005 | — | — | — | — | — | — | — | — | — | Independent's Day |
| "Wet My Whistle" (featuring Sara Stokes) | 2005 | — | — | — | — | — | — | — | — | — | Independent's Day |
| "Hit 'Em / Ding!" | 2007 | — | — | — | — | — | — | — | — | — | The Bar Exam |
| "Shake This" | 2009 | — | — | — | — | — | — | — | — | — | Street Hop |
| "Part of Me" | 2009 | — | — | — | — | — | — | — | — | — | Street Hop |
| "New Money" | 2009 | — | — | — | — | — | — | — | — | — | Street Hop |
| "Vagina" | 2010 | — | — | — | — | — | — | — | — | — | The Bar Exam 3 |
| "Writer's Block" (featuring Eminem) | 2011 | — | 104 | — | — | — | — | — | — | 199 | Success Is Certain |
| "Second Place" | 2011 | — | — | — | — | — | — | — | — | — | Success Is Certain |
| "Legendary" (featuring Travis Barker) | 2011 | — | — | — | — | — | — | — | — | — | Success Is Certain |
| "One for the Money" (featuring Skillz and Diamond D) | 2012 | — | — | — | — | — | — | — | — | — | Non-album single |
| "Detroit Vs. Everybody" (with Eminem, Big Sean, Danny Brown, Dej Loaf and Trick-Trick) | 2014 | 8 | 28 | 23 | — | — | — | — | — | — | Shady XV |
| "T.D.M.T.L.T.A." (They Don't Make Them Like This Anymore) | 2015 | — | — | — | — | — | — | — | — | — | Non-album singles |
| "Go Crazy (featuring Young Product)" | 2016 | — | — | — | — | — | — | — | — | — | Non-album singles |
| "Tabernacle" | 2016 | — | — | — | — | — | — | — | — | — | Layers, Tabernacle: Trust The Shooter |
| "Wait a Minute (Freestyle)" | 2017 | — | — | — | — | — | — | — | — | — | The Bar Exam 4 |
| "I Got The Keys (Freestyle)" | 2017 | — | — | — | — | — | — | — | — | — | The Bar Exam 4 |
| "Beats Keep Callin' (Freestyle)" | 2017 | — | — | — | — | — | — | — | — | — | The Bar Exam 4 |
| "Let's Take Them To War (Freestyle)" | 2017 | — | — | — | — | — | — | — | — | — | The Bar Exam 4 |
| "Barely Human" (featuring Tech N9ne) | 2017 | — | — | — | — | — | — | — | — | — | Non-album single |
| "Boblo Boat" (featuring J. Cole) | 2018 | — | — | — | — | — | — | — | — | — | Book of Ryan |
| "Stay Woke" (featuring Ashley Sorrell) | 2018 | — | — | — | — | — | — | — | — | — | Book of Ryan |
| "Dumb" (featuring Boogie) | 2018 | — | — | — | — | — | — | — | — | — | Book of Ryan |
| "Caterpillar" (featuring Eminem and King Green) | 2018 | 13 | — | — | — | — | — | — | — | — | Book of Ryan |
| "Black Savage" (featuring Sy Ari da Kid, White Gold, Cyhi the Prynce and T.I.) | 2019 | — | — | — | — | — | — | — | — | — | The Allegory |
| "I Don't Age" | 2020 | — | — | — | — | — | — | — | — | — | The Allegory |
"—" denotes a recording that did not chart or was not released in that territory.

=== As featured artist ===
List of singles as featured artist, with selected chart positions, showing year released and album name
| Title | Year | Peak chart positions | | Album |
| Title | Year | US | AUS | Album |
|---|---|---|---|---|
| "Black Mask (We're Taking It All)" (The 701 Squad) | 1999 | — | — | Black Mask (soundtrack) |
| "Thugout" (Severe featuring Royce da 5'9") | 2000 | | | "Black Wednesday" |
| "Can't Get It Back (Trackmasters Remix)" (Blaque featuring Royce da 5'9") | 2001 | | | "Can't Get It Back" |
| "I Wanna Be Bad" (Willa Ford featuring Royce da 5'9") | 2001 | 22 | 52 | Willa Was Here |
| "Change" (Promise featuring Supastition, Mr. Probz and Royce da 5'9") | 2008 | — | — | More Than Music |
| "Curious (What Up wit Ya Girl)" (Tech N9ne featuring Irv Da Phenom and Royce da 5'9") | 2010 | — | — | Bad Season |
| "5´9" + Won" (KVBeats featuring Pace Won and Royce da 5'9") | 2010 | — | — | The Résumé |
| "Twerk Dat, Pop That" (Trick-Trick featuring Eminem and Royce da 5'9") | 2014 | — | — | Non-album singles |
| "All Black Neighborhood" (Consequence featuring Royce da 5'9") | 2017 | — | — | Non-album singles |
| "Keep Your Enemies Closer" (Faulkner featuring Royce da 5'9") | 2017 | — | — | Non-album singles |
| "Triumphant" (Chavis Chandler featuring Royce da 5'9") | 2017 | | | Non-album singles |
| "Level Up" (Team 734 featuring Royce da 5'9" and Kristi Lauren) | 2017 | — | — | Non-album singles |
| "ILL" (DJ Green Lantern featuring Royce da 5'9" and Conway) | 2017 | — | — | Non-album singles |
| "I'm On 3.0" (Trae tha Truth featuring T.I., Dave East, Tee Grizzley, Royce da 5'9", Curren$y, DRAM, Snoop Dogg, Fabolous, Rick Ross, Chamillionaire, G-Eazy, Styles P, E-40, Mark Morrison and Gary Clark, Jr.) | 2017 | — | — | Tha Truth, Pt. 3 |
| "Father Figure" (Tobe Nwigwe featuring Royce da 5'9" & Black Thought) | 2020 | — | — | Cincoriginals |
| "Crossroads" (Hi-Rez featuring Royce da 5'9'' & KR$NA) | 2021 | — | — | Non-album single |
"—" denotes a recording that did not chart or was not released in that territory.

== Guest appearances ==
List of non-single guest appearances, with other performing artists, showing year released and album name
| Title | Year | Other artist(s) | Album |
|---|---|---|---|
| "Bad Meets Evil" | 1999 | Eminem | The Slim Shady LP |
| "Fuckin' wit Us" | 1999 | Boom!, B-O | Take Cover |
| "Me Thugs" | 1999 | Forbidden Froot | Pictures of Life |
| "Don't Fuck with Me" | 2000 | Meance to Society | Situation Critical |
| "Royce da 5'9" (Interlude)" | 2000 | Tony Touch | The Piece Maker |
| "What the Beat" | 2001 | DJ Clue, Eminem, Method Man | The Professional 2 |
| "In Trouble" | 2001 | Bowtie | Son of a Junkie |
| "Intro / Live & Direct" | 2001 | Da Beatminerz, Lord Tariq | Brace 4 Impak |
| "Don't Hate" | 2002 | Kool Savas, Tre' Little | Der beste Tag meines Lebens |
| "Wir Sind Rap" | 2002 | Tefla & Jaleel | Bounce Mit Uns |
| "Pusha" | 2005 | Afu-Ra | State of the Arts |
| "Enough Beef" | 2005 | Sway & King Tech, Chino XL, Common | Back 2 Basics |
| "Unexplainable Hunger" | 2005 | Classified, Choclair | Boy-Cott-In the Industry |
| "I Wish You Would" | 2005 | Canibus, Chino XL | Politics of the Business |
| "The King Meets the Sickest" | 2006 | Vakill | Worst Fears Confirmed |
| "Street Massacre" | 2006 | Outerspace | Blood Brothers |
| "Back Against the Wall" | 2007 | Statik Selektah, Cormega | Spell My Name Right: The Album |
| "Slaughterhouse" | 2008 | Joe Budden, Joell Ortiz, Crooked I, Nino Bless | Halfway House |
| "Losing Out" | 2008 | Black Milk | Tronic |
| "Glow" | 2008 | Jake One, Elzhi | White Van Music |
| "All Around the World" | 2008 | Trick Trick | The Villain |
| "Do My Thing" | 2008 | DJ Revolution, Guilty Simpson | King of the Decks |
| "Motown 25" | 2008 | Elzhi | The Preface |
| "Judge" | 2008 | Ca$his, Young De, Crooked I | Global Warning 3 |
| "Clear the Room" | 2008 | Ca$his, Young De, Crooked I | Homeland Security |
| "Take It All Back" | 2008 | Statik Selektah, Paula Campbell, Reks, Ea$y Money | Stick 2 the Script |
| "Say It Again" | 2009 | Wale, 9th Wonder | Back to the Feature |
| "If You Forgot My Name" | 2009 | Tone Spliff, Apathy | Authentic |
| "They Call This (Hip Hop)" | 2009 | Classified, B.o.B | Self Explanatory |
| "My Castle" | 2010 | Sandy Solo, Sirah | Coming to America |
| "Rap's Finest" | 2010 | Bizarre, Kuniva, Seven da General | Friday Night at St. Andrews |
| "Money Clip" | 2010 | Kuniva | Retribution |
| "Never Caught Slippin'" | 2010 | Nottz, Snoop Dogg | You Need This Music |
| "Ya Dayz R #'D" (NYG-Mix) | 2010 | DJ Premier, Freddie Foxxx, The Lady of Rage | DJ Premier Presents Get Used To Us |
| "Come Around" | 2010 | Statik Selektah, Termanology | 100 Proof: The Hangover |
| "What Y'all Chasin" | 2010 | Elusive, Bruce Hathcock | District 2 District |
| "Deadly Medley" | 2010 | Black Milk, Elzhi | Album of the Year |
| "Nightmares" | 2011 | Professor Green, Kobe | At Your Inconvenience |
| "Assassins" | 2011 | Pharoahe Monch, Jean Grae | W.A.R. (We Are Renegades) |
| "Finish What You Start" | 2011 | Joell Ortiz | Free Agent |
| "Life's a Bitch" | 2011 | Elzhi, Stokely Williams | Elmatic |
| "See You in Hell" | 2011 | Omar LinX, Joell Ortiz | City of Ommz |
| "Them Vets" | 2011 | Paradime, Ketchphraze | Breaking Beauregard |
| "Spazz Out" | 2012 | Drew32 | The B.U.R.N. Project |
| "Can't Push" | 2012 | Tef Poe | War Machine 2 |
| "100" | 2012 | Big Sean, Kendrick Lamar, James Fauntleroy | Detroit |
| "I Swear" | 2012 | Bishop Lamont, Swish | The Layover |
| "Coin Flip Lunatic" | 2012 | Twiztid | Abominationz |
| "Watch the Sky Fall" (Remix) | 2012 | Koncept | Watch the Sky Fall EP |
| "Winner's Circle" | 2012 | MarvWon | Heavy Is The Head... |
| "1,2,3" | 2012 | Ca$his | The Art of Dying |
| "All In My Head" | 2012 | Joe Budden, Kobe | A Loose Quarter |
| "Tell Me To My Face" | 2013 | Havoc | 13 |
| "My City" | 2013 | Mack Maine, Talib Kweli | Freestyle 102: No Pens or Pads |
| "Craziness" | 2013 | Nick Vibes | —N/a |
| "You Can Make It" | 2013 | Achromatik | The Greyscale |
| "Michigan Shit" | 2013 | Jon Connor | Unconscious State |
| "Slaughter Session" | 2013 | Tony Touch, Joell Ortiz, Crooked I | The Piece Maker 3: Return of the 50 MC's |
| "Stop Playin'" | 2013 | Bun B, Redman | Trill OG: The Epilogue |
| "Don't Get in My Way" | 2014 | King Los, Shanica Knowles | Zero Gravity II |
| "The Imperial" | 2014 | Statik Selektah, Action Bronson, Black Thought | What Goes Around |
| "Coward" | 2014 | Kid Vishis | Timing Is Everything |
| "Lights Out" | 2014 | Pink Grenade | Fear of a Pink Planet |
| "Giraffe Pussy" | 2014 | Apollo Brown, Ras Kass, Xzibit, Bishop Lamont | Blasphemy |
| "Throw Ya Hood Up" | 2014 | DJ Mustard, RJ, Dom Kennedy | 10 Summers |
| "Burnin" | 2014 | Marcus D, Kid Vishis, Crooked I | Simply Complex |
| "Revolutionary Ride Music" | 2015 | DJ EFN, O.C., Reks, Your Old Droog | Another Time |
| "Afreak" | 2015 | Squala Orphan, Rock | Radical Eyez |
| "Crystal Clear" | 2015 | Statik Selektah | Lucky 7 |
| "Warriors" | 2015 | Papa Roach | F.E.A.R. |
| "Forbidden" | 2015 | Ro Spit | IV Life... |
| "The Greatest" | 2016 | Fatt Father, Low Down, Kuniva | Veterans Day |
| "Go Off" | 2016 | Kid Vishis, VMDP | The Purge |
| "Paradise" | 2016 | Jonathan Hay, Ali, KXNG Crooked | The Urban Hitchcock EP |
| "Hold the Drums" | 2016 | Smoke DZA, Pete Rock | Don't Smoke Rock |
| "Kick, Snare & Hi-Hats Intro" | 2016 | Snowgoons, DJ Premier | Goon Bap |
| "A Dangerous Cloth" | 2016 | DJ Kay Slay, Ransom, McGruff | The Rap Attack |
| "God Bless" | 2016 | Denaun Porter, Marv | Connect |
| "Suicide Squad" | 2016 | MarvWon | Soundtrack of Autumn |
| "Calisthenics" | 2017 | Nolan the Ninja | Yen |
| "Hold On" | 2017 | Ty Farris | Room 39 |
| "Testing Me" | 2017 | Page Kennedy, King Los, Denaun Porter | Torn Pages |
| "Nobody 2" | 2017 | Avenue, Ariez Onasis | Mass Ave & Lenox |
| "Mandatory" | 2017 | Conway | G.O.A.T. |
| "100,000 Machine Gunz" | 2017 | Westside Gunn, Conway | Hitler on Steroids |
| "Nobody Move" | 2017 | Statik Selektah, Raekwon | 8 |
| "Truth (Why You Mad)" | 2017 | KXNG Crooked | Good Vs. Evil II: The Red Empire |
| "Keep Calm" | 2017 | Kuniva, Kis Vishis | N/A |
| "Everybody's a Bitch" | 2017 | King Los, Hopsin | Moors Bars |
| "Timberlan'd Up" | 2018 | Apollo Brown & Joell Ortiz | Mona Lisa |
| "Who Are You" | 2018 | Benny the Butcher, Melanie Rutherford | Tana Talk 3 |
| "Not Alike" | 2018 | Eminem | Kamikaze |
| "What's Real" | 2019 | Gang Starr, Group Home | One of the Best Yet |
| "Can't Lose" | 2019 | Apollo Brown | Sincerely, Detroit |
| "The Sermon" | 2019 | Mickey Facts & Nottz | The Achievement |
| "You Gon' Learn" | 2020 | Eminem, White Gold | Music to Be Murdered By |
| "Yah Yah" | 2020 | Eminem, Black Thought, Q-Tip, Denaun | Music to Be Murdered By |
| "I Will" | 2020 | Eminem, Kxng Crooked, Joell Ortiz | Music to Be Murdered By |
| "This Is Not New" | 2020 | J.R. Writer | I Really Rap Too |
| "Friday Night Cypher" | 2020 | Big Sean, Tee Grizzley, Kash Doll, Cash Kidd, Payroll, 42 Dugg, Boldy James, Drego, Sada Baby, Eminem | Detroit 2 |
| "Dogs Don't Lie" (Extended Version) | 2021 | IDK | USee4Yourself |
| "Placebo" | 2022 | Grip | IDFT!? |
| "Ten Years" | 2022 | Logic | Vinyl Days |
| "Head to Hades" | 2022 | Tobe Nwigwe | MoMINTS |
| "King" | 2023 | Bks, Emerson | Wolves of Africa |
| "Shine On" | 2024 | Tha Vill | The Godz III |

== Music videos ==
List of music videos, years released and director
| Title | Year | Director | Ref. |
|---|---|---|---|
| "Boom" | 1999 | | |
| "You Can't Touch Me" | 2000 | | |
| "Rock City" | 2002 | Antti Jokinen | |
| "Hip Hop" | 2004 | | |
| "Politics" | 2005 | | |
| "Shake This" | 2009 | Rik Cordero | |
| "Part of Me" | 2009 | Rik Cordero | |
| "Vagina" | 2010 | | |
| "Writer's Block" | 2011 | WALU | |
| "Tabernacle" | 2016 | Chris Chynoweth | |
| "Which Is Cool" | 2016 | Rik Cordero | |
| "Universe" | 2016 | Rik Cordero | |
| "Layers" | 2016 | Ryan Snyder | |
| "Boblo Boat" | 2018 | J. Cole | |
| "Caterpillar" | 2018 | James Larese | |
| "Summer on Lock" | 2018 | WALU | |
| "Cocaine" | 2019 | Safehouse | |
| "Black Savage" | 2019 | Cricket | |
| "Overcomer" | 2020 | offJimmer | |
| "Upside Down" | 2020 | offJimmer | |
| "Tricked" | 2020 | Cricket | |
| "I Don't Age" | 2021 | Joe LeFleur | |

== Production discography ==
List of production and non-performing songwriting credits, with performing artists, showing year released and album name
| Title | Year | Credit(s) | Artist(s) | Album |
|---|---|---|---|---|
| 22. "The Watcher/Outro"; (featuring Mary J. Blige and Rell) | 1999 | Songwriter | Dr. Dre | 2001 |
| 7. "Tell Me"; (featuring Christina Aguilera) | 2006 | Songwriter | Diddy | Press Play |
| "New Day" (featuring Alicia Keys and Dr. Dre) | 2012 | Songwriter | 50 Cent | Non-album single |
| 3. "You Gon' Learn"; (featuring Royce da 5'9" and White Gold) | 2020 | Producer | Eminem | Music to Be Murdered By |
| 8. "Darkness" | 2020 | Producer | Eminem | Music to Be Murdered By |
| 1. "Mr. Grace (Intro)" | 2020 | Producer | Royce da 5'9" | The Allegory |
| 2. "Dope Man"; (featuring Emanny and Cedric the Entertainer) | 2020 | Producer | Royce da 5'9" | The Allegory |
| 3. "I Don't Age" | 2020 | Producer | Royce da 5'9" | The Allegory |
| 4. "Pendulum"; (featuring Ashley Sorrell) | 2020 | Producer | Royce da 5'9" | The Allegory |
| 5. "I Play Forever"; (featuring Grafh) | 2020 | Producer | Royce da 5'9" | The Allegory |
| 6. "Ice Cream (Interlude)" | 2020 | Producer | Royce da 5'9" | The Allegory |
| 7. "On the Block"; (featuring Oswin Benjamin and DJ Premier) | 2020 | Producer | Royce da 5'9" | The Allegory |
| 8. "Generation Is Broken" | 2020 | Producer | Royce da 5'9" | The Allegory |
| 9. "Overcomer"; (featuring Westside Gunn) | 2020 | Producer | Royce da 5'9" | The Allegory |
| 10. "Ms. Grace (Interlude)" | 2020 | Producer | Royce da 5'9" | The Allegory |
| 11. "Thou Shall"; (featuring Kid Vishis) | 2020 | Producer | Royce da 5'9" | The Allegory |
| 12. "Fubu"; (featuring Conway the Machine) | 2020 | Producer | Royce da 5'9" | The Allegory |
| 13. "A Black Man's Favorite Shoe (Skit)" | 2020 | Producer | Royce da 5'9" | The Allegory |
| 14. "Upside Down"; (featuring Ashley Sorrell and Benny the Butcher) | 2020 | Producer | Royce da 5'9" | The Allegory |
| 15. "Perspective (Skit)" | 2020 | Producer | Royce da 5'9" | The Allegory |
| 16. "Tricked"; (featuring KXNG Crooked) | 2020 | Producer | Royce da 5'9" | The Allegory |
| 17. "Black People in America" | 2020 | Producer | Royce da 5'9" | The Allegory |
| 18. "Black Savage"; (featuring Sy Ari da Kid, White Gold, Cyhi the Prynce, and T.I.) | 2020 | Producer | Royce da 5'9" | The Allegory |
| 19. "Rhinestone Doo Rag" | 2020 | Producer | Royce da 5'9" | The Allegory |
| 20. "Young World"; (featuring Vince Staples and G Perico) | 2020 | Producer | Royce da 5'9" | The Allegory |
| 21. "My People Free"; (featuring Ashley Sorrell) | 2020 | Producer | Royce da 5'9" | The Allegory |
| 22. "Hero"; (featuring White Gold) | 2020 | Producer | Royce da 5'9" | The Allegory |

== See also ==
- Bad Meets Evil discography
- Slaughterhouse discography
