= Slaughterhouse (disambiguation) =

A slaughterhouse is a facility where animals are killed.

Slaughterhouse may also refer to:

== Film and television ==
- Slaughterhouse (film), a 1987 horror-comedy film
- "The Slaughterhouse" (Brooklyn Nine-Nine), (Season 4, Episode 20)
- "Slaughterhouse" (CSI: Miami), (Season 1, Episode 8)
- "Slaughterhouse" (Hell on Wheels), (Season 2, Episode 3)
- "Slaughterhouse" (Justified), (Season 3 Episode 13) *Served as the Season Finale*

== Law ==
- Slaughter-House Cases (1873), a landmark decision by Supreme Court of the United States regarding the Fourteenth Amendment.

== Music ==
- Slaughterhouse (group), a former hip hop supergroup
  - Slaughterhouse (Slaughterhouse album), 2009
  - Slaughterhouse (EP), a 2011 EP by Slaughterhouse
- Slaughterhouse (Ty Segall Band album), 2012
- The Slaughterhouse, a 2004 album by Prince
- SlaughtaHouse, a 1993 album by Masta Ace
- "Slaughterhouse", a 1987 song by Goo Goo Dolls from Goo Goo Dolls
- "Slaughterhouse", a 1984 song by Death from Reign of Terror
- "Slaughterhouse", a 2022 song by Motionless in White from Scoring the End of the World, featuring guest vocals from Bryan Garris

== Places ==
- Slaughterhouse Creek
- Slaughterhouse Beach (Mokule'ia), a beach on the island of Maui in Hawaii
- Slaughter House Covered Bridge, Northfield, Vermont
- Yorba–Slaughter Adobe, fka Slaughter House, Chino, California

== Other ==
- Slaughterhouse (painting), an early 20th-century painting by Nicolai Fechin

== See also ==
- Slaughterhouse-Five, a 1969 novel by Kurt Vonnegut
  - Slaughterhouse-Five (film), a 1972 adaptation of the novel
