= Throw That =

2012 song by Slaughterhouse

Single by Slaughterhouse featuring Eminem

from the album Welcome to: Our House
- Released: August 21, 2012
- Length: 3:57
- Label: Shady; Interscope
- Songwriters: R. Montgomery; J. Budden; J. Ortiz; D. Wickliffe; T. Williams; L. Campbell; D. Obbs; M. Ross; C. Wongwon; J. Brown; R. Gunyard; M. Mathers
- Producers: T-Minus; Eminem

Slaughterhouse singles chronology
"Goodbye" (2012)	"Throw That" (2012)	"Y'all Ready Know" (2014)

Eminem singles chronology
"Space Bound" (2011)	"Throw That" (2012)	"My Life" (2012)

"Throw That" is the fifth single of the hip hop supergroup Slaughterhouse from their second and final album Welcome to: Our House, which was released on August 28, 2012 via Shady Records and Interscope Records. The song features Eminem and production by Eminem and T-Minus. It was available to purchase on iTunes on August 21, 2012. "Throw That" entered the Billboard Hot 100 at number 98, making it both the group's and the album's most successful single.

== Critical reception ==
David Jeffries of AllMusic highlighted it and reviewed it positively: "Still in the club, "Throw That" sits in the same booth but seeking 'higher mileage' with 'I throw this, I throw this dick on you girl' as its brutish hook." Slava Kuperstein of HipHopDX thought that the song was skippable. Phillip Mlynar of Spin was acclaiming noting that it expertly channels the disorderly energy of iconic late-'90s Tunnel-era anthems. Critic DJBooth noted that "You don’t have Em on the hook of a stripper anthem like Throw That without some hit aspirations" and opined that the song was "squeezed in a box."

== Track listing ==
Digital single

No.	Title	Writer(s)	Producer(s)	Length
1.	"Throw That" (featuring Eminem)	M. Mathers, R. Montgomery, J. Budden, J. Ortiz, D. Wickliffe, T. Williams, L. Campbell, D. Obbs, M. Ross, C. Wongwon, J. Brown, R. Gunyard	T-Minus, Eminem	3:57

== Charts ==
"Throw That" debuted and peaked at numbers 98 and 69 on the Billboard Hot 100 and Canadian Hot 100 charts respectively for the week of September 8, 2012.

Chart (2012)	Peak position
US Billboard Hot 100	98
Canada Hot 100 (Billboard)	69

== Release history ==
Country	Date	Format	Label
Canada	August 21, 2012	Digital download	Shady, Interscope
United States	August 21, 2012	Digital download	Shady, Interscope
