= The One (Slaughterhouse song) =

Single by Slaughterhouse featuring The New Royales

from the album Slaughterhouse
- Released: July 2, 2009
- Recorded: 2009
- Genre: Hip hop, rap rock
- Length: 3:40
- Label: E1 Music
- Songwriters: Ryan Montgomery, Dominick Wickliffe, Joseph Anthony Budden II, Joell Ortiz, Khalil Abdul-Rahman
- Producer: DJ Khalil

Slaughterhouse singles chronology
"Move On" (2009)	"The One" (2009)	"Microphone" (2009)

Music video
- "The One" on YouTube

"The One" is the debut single by Slaughterhouse, a hip hop supergroup consisting of rappers Crooked I, Joe Budden, Joell Ortiz and Royce da 5'9". It was released on July 2, 2009 and was produced by DJ Khalil. The song is from the group's self-titled debut album. The beat samples heavily from Boogie Down Productions' "I'm Still #1" and Lenny Kravitz's "Fly Away".

== Music video ==
A music video for the song was directed by Rik Cordero. Behind-the-scenes footage from the music video, which features commentary from Slaughterhouse and the director, was leaked on Cordero's Three/21 Media website on June 23, 2009. The entire video takes place in the penthouse of the Night Hotel. The video premiered on July 12 online and on MTV2 Sucka Free & MTV Jams (hourly).

== Track listing ==
iTunes Release

(Released: July 2, 2009)

1. "The One" (Clean) – 3:39
2. "The One" (Dirty) – 3:40
3. "The One" (Instrumental) – 3:38

== Other remixes ==
On October 19, 2009, Travis Barker released a video of "The One Travis Barker Remix" made in his studio, with drums. Bun B has an added verse on the Travis Barker remix. Lupe Fiasco also did a freestyle over the beat for his mixtape, Enemy of the State.

In 2012, rapper and actor OMG released a mixtape titled "Jacking For Beats", which included his own lyrics over the song's beat.
