= My Life (Slaughterhouse song) =

Single by Slaughterhouse featuring Cee Lo Green

from the album Welcome to: Our House
- Released: May 15, 2012
- Genre: Hip hop
- Length: 4:25
- Label: Shady; Interscope
- Songwriters: Ryan Montgomery; Joell Ortiz; Dominick Wickliffe; Joe Budden; Nicholas Warwar; Raymond Diaz; M. Aiello; Mike Gaffey; Francesco Bontempi; Annerley Gordon; Giorgio Spagna; Peter Glenister; Thomas Callaway
- Producers: StreetRunner; Raymond "Sarom" Diaz; Eminem (co.)

Slaughterhouse singles chronology
"Hammer Dance" (2012)	"My Life" (2012)	"Goodbye" (2012)

"My Life" is the second single by hip hop group Slaughterhouse from their album Welcome to: Our House. The song features artist Cee Lo Green and production by Streetrunner and Sarom. The song samples Corona's song "The Rhythm of The Night". It was available to purchase on iTunes on May 15, 2012.

== Music video ==
A music video for the song was released on June 20, 2012 under VEVO on YouTube. It features a cameo appearance by rapper Eminem, which comes before the song starts.

== Track listing ==
Digital single

No.	Title	Writer(s)	Producer(s)	Length
1.	"My Life" (featuring Cee Lo Green)	Ryan Montgomery; Joell Ortiz; Dominick Wickliffe; Joe Budden; Nicholas Warwar; Raymond Diaz; M. Aiello; Mike Gaffey; Francesco Bontempi; Annerley Gordon; Giorgio Spagna; Peter Glenister; Thomas Callaway	StreetRunner; Raymond "Sarom" Diaz; Eminem^{[a]}	4:25

Notes

- ^{^[a]} signifies a co-producer.

== Release history ==
Country	Date	Format	Label
United States	May 15, 2012	Digital download	Shady, Interscope

== Charts ==
Chart (2012)	Peak position
US Bubbling Under Hot 100 Singles (Billboard)	8
Canada (Canadian Hot 100)	87
US Heatseakers Songs	22
US Digital Songs	57
