= On the House =

On the House may refer to:

- On the House (album), by hip hop super group Slaughterhouse
- On the House (TV series), a British television comedy
- On the House (horse)
- On the House, a house music group membering Marshall Jefferson
- On the House: A Washington Memoir, a book by John Boehner

== See also ==
- Gratis versus libre
