= Goodbye (Slaughterhouse song) =

Single by Slaughterhouse featuring Ming Xia

from the album Welcome to: Our House
- Released: August 14, 2012
- Genre: Hip hop
- Length: 5:02
- Label: Shady; Interscope
- Songwriters: Joell Ortiz; Dominick Wickliffe; Joe Budden; Matthew Samuels; Matthew Burnett; I. Perez
- Producers: Boi-1da; Matthew Burnett (add.); Eminem (co.)

Slaughterhouse singles chronology
"My Life" (2012)	"Goodbye" (2012)	"Throw That" (2012)

"Goodbye" is the fourth single of the hip hop group Slaughterhouse from their album Welcome to: Our House, which was released on August 28, 2012. The song features Ming-Xia formally of The Spooks. The song features production by Boi-1da. It was available to purchase on iTunes on August 14, 2012. There is a remix featuring Fat Joe, dedicated to Chris Lighty.

== Music video ==
A music video for the song was released on November 9, 2012 under VEVO on YouTube.

== Track listing ==
Digital single

No.	Title	Writer(s)	Producer(s)	Length
1.	"Goodbye"	Joell Ortiz; Dominick Wickliffe; Joe Budden; Matthew Samuels; Matthew Burnett; I. Perez	Boi-1da; Matthew Burnett^{[a]}; Eminem^{[b]}	5:02

Notes

- ^{^[a]} signifies an additional producer.
- ^{^[b]} signifies a co-producer.

== Release history ==
Country	Date	Format	Label
United States	August 14, 2012	Digital download	Shady, Interscope

== Charts ==
Chart (2012)	Peak position
US R&B/Hip-Hop Digital Songs	49
US Rap Digital Songs	50
