= Slaughterhouse (EP) =

Slaughterhouse EP

EP by Slaughterhouse
- Released: February 8, 2011
- Recorded: 2010
- Genres: Hardcore hip-hop; underground hip-hop
- Length: 28:30
- Label: E1
- Producers: Black Milk; Frequency; M-Phazes; Mr. Porter; Sean C & LV

Slaughterhouse chronology
Slaughterhouse (2009)	Slaughterhouse EP (2011)	On the House (2012)

Slaughterhouse is the only extended play by hip-hop supergroup Slaughterhouse. It was released on February 8, 2011 through E1 Music. The album debuted at #132 on the Billboard charts, after having sold 5,100 copies.

== Background ==
Speculation had been brewing for quite some time that the group would be signing with Shady Records, after the group made a cameo in the "Forever" music video. Throughout 2010, it was confirmed that the group would be signing to the label but multiple contractual obligations held the signing up. Despite the delay, it was confirmed on January 12, 2011 that the group had successfully signed to the label along with Alabama rapper Yelawolf, and the two acts would be appearing on the cover of the March issue of XXL along with Shady Records founder Eminem.

== Singles ==
On January 10, 2011, the single "Back on the Scene" featuring Dres of Black Sheep was released on the internet. The following day, a remix to group member Joell Ortiz's song "Put Some Money On It" featuring rap group The LOX was also released as a single.

== Reception ==
Professional ratings
Review scores
Source	Rating
AllMusic	3/5 stars
HipHopDX	4/5 stars
Pitchfork	(4.7/10)
RapReviews	(7.5/10)

The EP has been met with strong reviews, with many critics stating that it is an improvement from the group's 2009 debut.

== Commercial performance ==
As of April 2012, it has sold 15,198 copies in the United States.

== Track listing ==
As confirmed by iTunes, co-writers by DiscoOS.

No.	Title	Writer(s)	Producer(s)	Length
1.	"Back on the Scene" (featuring Dres)	Ryan Montgomery; Dominick Wickliffe; Joell Ortiz; Joseph Budden; Andres Titus; Mark Landon	M-Phazes	4:11
2.	"Sun Doobie"	Montgomery; Wickliffe; Ortiz; Budden; Denaun Porter	Mr. Porter	3:03
3.	"Everybody Down"	Montgomery; Wickliffe; Ortiz; Budden; Curtis Cross	Black Milk	5:17
4.	"Put Some Money on It" (remix) (featuring The Lox)	Montgomery; Wickliffe; Ortiz; Budden; Jason Phillips; David Styles; Sean Divine Jacobs; Deleno Matthews; Levar Coppin	Sean C & LV	4:29
5.	"Fight Club" (remix)	Montgomery; Wickliffe; Ortiz; Budden; Bryan Fryzel	Frequency	3:22
6.	"Move On" (remix) (featuring Iffy)	Montgomery; Wickliffe; Ortiz; Budden; Alonzo Stevenson; Fryzel	Frequency	8:08
Total length:				28:30

== Personnel ==
By DiscoOS.

- Andres Titus: Composer, Performer
- Alonzo Mario Stevenson: Composer
- Andrew Kelley: Art Direction, Design
- Bob Perry: A&R
- Bryan Fryzel
- Chad Griffith: Photography
- David Styles: Composer, Performer
- Deleno Matthews: Composer
- Dominick Wickliffe: Composer, Performer
- Jason Phillips: Composer, Performer
- Joseph Budden: Composer, Performer
- Joell Ortiz: Composer, Performer
- KK Rosemond: A&R admin
- Levar Coppin: Composer
- Mark Landon: Composer
- Paul Grosso: Creative Direction
- Ryan Montgomery: Composer, Performer
- Sean Divine Jacobs: Composer, Performer
- Shawnte Crespo: Product Manager
