= The Allegory =

Studio album by Royce da 5'9"
- Released: February 21, 2020
- Genre: Hip hop
- Length: 68:04
- Label: eOne
- Producer: Royce da 5'9"; DJ Premier; Miki Cardovillis; Symbolyc One

Royce da 5'9" chronology
Book of Ryan (2018)	The Allegory (2020)

Singles from The Allegory
- 1. "Black Savage" Released: November 15, 2019; 2. "Overcomer" Released: January 17, 2020; 3. "I Don't Age" Released: January 31, 2020; 4. "Upside Down" Released: February 7, 2020

The Allegory is the eighth studio album by American rapper Royce da 5'9". It was released through eOne Music on February 21, 2020. It features guest appearances from Benny the Butcher, Conway the Machine, KXNG Crooked, Cyhi the Prynce, DJ Premier, Eminem, Grafh, Sy Ari da Kid, T.I., Vince Staples, Westside Gunn, and Cedric the Entertainer among others. Production was handled by Royce da 5'9" himself on all of the album's tracks, making it his first album to be entirely self-produced.

== Background ==
On December 11, 2019, Royce da 5'9" revealed the album's title and cover art on Instagram. The cover art is a reflection of the album's politically inspired themes, containing lyrics that focus on societal issues, similar to some of Royce's previous work such as the track "America" from his 2016 album Layers.

Speaking about the album's title in an interview, Royce said "The goal was to make something that feels like a hip-hop album, but that has a lot of layers you may not necessarily get on the first time. It's really abstract in the way that it's constructed. It goes against all the normal standard laws and shit that everybody's creating right now. 'This can't be this length... This has to be longer... This has to be shorter... That has to be that way.' It's going in a different direction. It's the anti-everything."

Unlike Royce's previous album Book of Ryan, the album did not necessarily focus on a central theme. He explained that "it's whatever it needs to be. Usually, when I do albums, there is a main theme. With [my last album] Book of Ryan, there was a main theme. That was my focus when I was making the individual songs. But this album, I didn't want any song to be a focus of a theme. I wanted it to be: you're enjoying the grassroots elements of hip-hop, then out of nowhere there's a line or two that I could've said on a song three songs back. I wanted everything to be very splashes of paint all over the canvas. I wanted it to sound like Quentin Tarantino directed it. I didn't want it to be anything traditional. There's no one conceptual song. There's no one song that sums up anything, but everything together creates the complete concept of the Allegory.

The Allegory was Royce da 5'9"'s first self-produced album. Speaking on the production process, he said "My integrity means everything to me. If I say I'm producing it, I want people to feel 'OK, Royce said he produced it, he produced it.' I don't want to be one of these guys, you hear about 'em later like 'oh, he didn’t really do that beat. I heard such and such did that beat.' You run the risk of that happening when you have people in the room. Because I realized how much of a luxury it is to have DJ Premier sitting in a room or Mr. Porter sitting in a room. To the naked eye, why would he be there? Unless he's doing something. If he wasn't doing anything, I didn't have him around this time. Like, for Book of Ryan, I'd have [Mr. Porter] around because I love his creative input. But with this album, I shied away from even having any of those guys around. Because I don't want them to hold my hand."

== Singles and promotion ==
The lead single, "Black Savage" featuring Sy Ari da Kid, White Gold, Cyhi the Prynce, and T.I., was released on November 15, 2019. The song was released as part of Jay-Z's "Inspire Change" campaign, and its music video premiered on November 14, 2019. The second single, "Overcomer" featuring Westside Gunn, was released on January 17, 2020, along with a music video. The third single, "I Don't Age", was released on January 31, 2020. The album's final single, "Upside Down" featuring Ashley Sorrell and Benny the Butcher, was released on February 7, 2020. The music video was released the same day.

The music video for "I Don't Age" was released on February 23, 2021, and was directed by Joe LeFleur. A music video for "Hero", featuring White Gold and directed by Lanfia, was released on March 4, 2021.

On March 6, 2020, Royce da 5'9" announced The Allegory US Tour to promote the album, which included dates from April 21 to May 20, 2020. However, the tour was postponed due to the ongoing COVID-19 pandemic.

== Critical reception ==
Professional ratings
Aggregate scores
Source	Rating
Metacritic	79/100
Review scores
Source	Rating
AllMusic	4/5 stars
Exclaim!	9/10
HipHopDX	4.2/5
NME	4/5 stars
Pitchfork	5.8/10
Q	4/5 stars
RapReviews	7/10

The Allegory received critical acclaim from music critics. At Metacritic, which assigns a normalized rating out of 100 to reviews from mainstream critics, the album received an average score of 79 based on seven reviews, which indicates "generally favorable reviews".

Kyle Mullin of Exclaim! praised the album saying, "That's right: sonically, thematically, lyrically — on every level, Royce gives The Allegory his all. And the result is the best LP yet in his 20-year-strong career". HipHopDX critic Kevin Cortez stated, "The Allegory plays out as Royce's most consolidated offering yet. A definite career high-point for a rapper whose résumé spans over 20 years". AllMusic's Neil Z. Young said, "Intense and thrilling, The Allegory is a powerful work with uncomfortably realistic and poignant snapshots of American life that linger long after the last song has finished". Will Lavin of NME said, "Royce's 2018 album Book of Ryan was always going to be a tough act to follow, but The Allegory stands up as an accomplished body of work, packed full of poetic intricacies and life lessons, soundtracked by the sound of Detroit; it will likely end up on the majority of 2020 end-of-year rap lists". George Garner of Q said, "At 22 tracks - including a spoken interlude by Eminem - there's a lot to digest here. But, crucially, a lot worth digesting". RapReviews.com writer Sy Shackleford said, "While handling all of the production himself is a valiant effort, it's evident that Royce had a wobbly experience with it in that it isn't fully consistent. Even so, The Allegory is another solid effort from the Detroit rhyme sayer".

In a mixed review, Jay Balfour of Pitchfork wrote: "His beats are generally chunky sample flips and simple loops, but he also has an ear for a good sound. But if you're listening to a Royce album it's because you want to hear the guy rap. To his credit, Royce has the rare effect of a rapper's extreme technical ability making him seem limber instead of rigid".

At the 63rd Annual Grammy Awards, The Allegory received a nomination for the Grammy Award for Best Rap Album.

== Track listing ==
- All songs produced by Royce da 5'9".

The Allegory track listing
No.	Title	Writer(s)	Length
1.	"Mr. Grace (Intro)"	Ryan Montgomery; Carl Smalls; D. Grace; E.J. Johnson	4:07
2.	"Dope Man" (featuring Emanny and Cedric the Entertainer)	R. Montgomery; Emanny Salgado; Cedric Kyles; Alton Taylor; Andre Young; Claydes Charles Smith; Dennis Thomas; George Brown; O'Shea Jackson; Richard Westfield; Robert Bell; Robert Mickens; Ronald Bell	3:41
3.	"I Don't Age"	R. Montgomery	2:47
4.	"Pendulum" (featuring Ashley Sorrell)	R. Montgomery; Ashley Sorrell; DeAndre Cortez Way; Johnson	4:44
5.	"I Play Forever" (featuring Grafh)	R. Montgomery; Philip Bernard; Anthony Markeith Reid	3:53
6.	"Ice Cream (Interlude)"	R. Montgomery; Melanie Rutherford	1:09
7.	"On the Block" (featuring Oswin Benjamin and DJ Premier)	R. Montgomery; Oswin Benjamin; Christopher Martin	3:54
8.	"Generation Is Broken"	R. Montgomery; Sorrell; Chavis Chandler	0:16
9.	"Overcomer" (featuring Westside Gunn)	R. Montgomery; Alvin Worthy; Johnson	5:14
10.	"Ms. Grace (Interlude)"	R. Montgomery; Grace; Johnson	1:06
11.	"Thou Shall" (featuring Kid Vishis)	R. Montgomery; Marcus Montgomery; Johnson	3:15
12.	"Fubu" (featuring Conway the Machine)	R. Montgomery; Demond Price	3:41
13.	"A Black Man's Favorite Shoe (Skit)"	R. Montgomery; A. Riker	0:25
14.	"Upside Down" (featuring Ashley Sorrell and Benny the Butcher)	R. Montgomery; Sorrell; Jeremie Pennick; Johnson; Suzanne Vega	4:29
15.	"Perspective (Skit)"	R. Montgomery; Marshall Mathers	2:24
16.	"Tricked" (featuring KXNG Crooked)	R. Montgomery; Dominick Wickliffe; Johnson; Ken Hirsch; Ron Miller	3:40
17.	"Black People in America"	R. Montgomery; Aliaune Thiam; Eric Narciandi; Victor Santiago Jr.	0:37
18.	"Black Savage" (featuring Sy Ari da Kid, White Gold, Cyhi the Prynce and T.I.)	R. Montgomery; Sy Ari Brockington; H. Amarr; Bobby Yewah; Cydel Charles Young; Clifford Harris	4:43
19.	"Rhinestone Doo Rag"	R. Montgomery	1:19
20.	"Young World" (featuring Vince Staples and G Perico)	R. Montgomery; Johnson; Vince Staples; Jeremy Nash; Kelvin Wooten; Larry Griffin	4:29
21.	"My People Free" (featuring Ashley Sorrell)	R. Montgomery; Sorrell; Johnson; Wooten; Griffin	4:37
22.	"Hero" (featuring White Gold)	R. Montgomery; Yewah; Johnson	3:34
Total length:			68:04

Notes

- "Perspective (Skit)" contains additional vocals from Eminem.

== Charts ==
Chart performance for The Allegory
Chart (2020)	Peak position
US Billboard 200	58
US Independent Albums (Billboard)	6
US Top R&B/Hip-Hop Albums (Billboard)	32
