= House Rules (mixtape) =

Mixtape by Slaughterhouse
- Released: May 21, 2014
- Recorded: 2013–2014
- Genre: Hip hop
- Length: 46:29
- Label: Shady
- Producer: AraabMuzik; The Heatmakerz; Illmind; Nottz; 8 Bars; DJ Pain 1; Dark Knight; Tabu; Harry Fraud

Slaughterhouse chronology
Welcome to: Our House (2012)	House Rules (2014)

House Rules is the second and final mixtape by Slaughterhouse, a hip hop supergroup consisting of rappers Joe Budden, Joell Ortiz, KXNG CROOKED and Royce da 5'9". It was released on May 21, 2014, exclusively on DatPiff. It served as a warm up for their 3rd studio album Glass House, which would eventually never see the light of day. The mixtape followed on from the groups' last successful mixtape, having been downloaded over 100,000 times in the first week.

== Critical reception ==
Professional ratings
Review scores
Source	Rating
HipHopDX	4/5 stars
XXL	4/5 stars

The mixtape received positive reviews from music critics. Omar Burgess of HipHopDX wrote "until the next retail album, the questions and expectations still remain unanswered. In the meantime, fans can enjoy a damn good mixtape." XXL concluded "if this is what we can expect from Slaughterhouse in 2014, there’s a lot to be excited about."

== Track listing ==
No.	Title	Producer(s)	Length
1.	"House Rules" (Intro)	8 Bars	4:41
2.	"SayDatThen"	Nottz	6:36
3.	"Interlude"	Illmind	3:43
4.	"Trade it All" (Joe Budden solo)	8 Bars; Dark Night	4:37
5.	"Keep It 100" (Royce da 5'9" solo)	AraabMuzik	2:33
6.	"Offshore"	DJ Pain 1	9:36
7.	"Struggle" (KXNG CROOKED solo)	Tabu	2:54
8.	"Life in the City" (Joell Ortiz solo)	The Heatmakerz	3:00
9.	"I Ain't Bullshittin"	AraabMuzik	3:52
10.	"I Don't Know"	Harry Fraud	4:57
