= On the House (album) =

Mixtape by Slaughterhouse
- Released: August 19, 2012
- Recorded: 2012
- Genre: Hip-hop
- Length: 72:44
- Label: Shady
- Producer: AraabMuzik; Hit-Boy; Jai Dave; J.U.S.T.I.C.E. League; The Alchemist; Mr. Porter; No I.D.; Pitchshifters; StreetRunner; Salaam Remi; Sarom; The Klassix

Slaughterhouse chronology
Slaughterhouse EP (2011)	On the House (2012)	Welcome to: Our House (2012)

On the House is the debut mixtape by hip-hop supergroup Slaughterhouse. It was released on August 19, 2012, as a warm up to their second studio album Welcome to: Our House with a release of August 28, 2012. The mixtape is hosted by DJ Drama.

== Background ==
On July 7, 2012, Royce announced in an interview with Jenny Boom Boom that the group would release a pre-album mixtape around the first week of August. Joe Budden revealed via Twitter that the mixtape is called On the House and will be hosted by DJ Drama. A promotional video for the mixtape was released on August 6, 2012, and previewed a song called "See Dead People". Rapper Sauce Tha Boss, signed to Crooked I's COB label, claimed via Twitter that the mixtape would drop on Friday, August 10, 2012. This, however, was not the case. Royce Da 5'9" released the cover art for the mixtape through Twitter on August 7. Amazon.com posted the album preview of Welcome to: OUR HOUSE with individual snippets of all the songs. The rumored track tentatively titled "All I Want" featuring Eminem which many thought would be on the DJ Drama Gangsta Grillz On The House mixtape is actually titled "Our House" and will be featured as the first song on the Welcome to: OUR HOUSE album. On August 16, Joe Budden released the song titled "Truth or Truth" through Twitter. On August 18, Thisis50.com released the official track list as seen below and, according to Joe Budden's Twitter account, there will be a sequel to the mixtape track titled "Truth or Truth Pt1" as being Part 2. Royce Da 5'9" confirmed On The House was to be released on August 19, 2012, at 12 pm noon EST via Twitter. However, the song "Coming Home" featuring a sample of soft pop hook was produced by Arxym Jai (Jai Dave) in the last minutes of the mixtape which resulted in a delay of an hour.

== Track listing ==
No.	Title	Producer(s)	Length
1.	"Back the Fuck Up"	StreetRunner; Sarom	6:15
2.	"Weight Scale"	Salaam Remi	5:15
3.	"On the House"	Sarom	3:47
4.	"Sucka MC's" (featuring Freeway)	Mr. Porter	5:09
5.	"Ya Talkin"	J.U.S.T.I.C.E. League	4:17
6.	"All on Me"	The Alchemist	3:59
7.	"See Dead People"	AraabMuzik	7:57
8.	"Where Sinners Dwell"	Hit-Boy	2:41
9.	"Juggernauts"	The Klasix	4:02
10.	"Coming Home"	Jai Dave	5:28
11.	"Gone" (featuring K-Young)	Pitchshifters	4:59
12.	"Who I Am" (featuring SLV)	Sarom	4:24
13.	"Truth or Truth Pt.1"	No I.D.	14:31

Recycled beats credits

- "Weight Scale" recycles "Nasty" by Nas and Niggas Bleed by The Notorious B.I.G.
- "Ya Talkin'" recycles "Maybach Music III" by Rick Ross.
- "Where Sinners Dwell" recycles "Way Too Cold" by Kanye West.
- "Truth or Truth Pt.1" recycles "Tears of Joy" by Rick Ross
- "Back the Fuck Up" recycles "Roman in Moscow" by Nicki Minaj
- "Who I Am" recycles "Dead Presidents" by Jay-Z
- "See Dead People" recycles "1,2,3 Grind" by Lloyd Banks
- "Juggernauts" recycles "Patiently Waiting" by 50 Cent featuring Eminem (Hook Only) and "Sirius" by The Alan Parsons Project
