= Welcome to: Our House =

Studio album by Slaughterhouse
- Released: August 28, 2012
- Recorded: 2011–2012
- Genre: Hip-hop
- Length: 64:22 (Normal version); 80:30 (Deluxe version)
- Label: Shady; Interscope
- Producer: Eminem (also exec.); Alex da Kid; AraabMuzik; Black Key; Boi-1da; The Maven Boys; Hit-Boy; I.L.O; JMIKE; Kane Beatz; Luis Resto; Matthew Burnett; Mr. Porter; No I.D.; Streetrunner; Sarom; The Mad Violinist; T-Minus; J.U.S.T.I.C.E. League; Zukhan

Slaughterhouse chronology
| On the House (2012) | Welcome to: Our House (2012) | House Rules (2014) |

Singles from Welcome to: Our House
- 1. "Hammer Dance" Released: March 13, 2012; 2. "My Life" Released: May 15, 2012; 3. "Throw It Away" Released: July 2, 2012; 4. "Goodbye" Released: August 9, 2012; 5. "Throw That" Released: August 21, 2012

Welcome to: Our House (stylized as welcome to: OUR HOUSE) is the second and final studio album by American hip-hop supergroup Slaughterhouse, consisting of Crooked I, Joe Budden, Joell Ortiz and Royce da 5'9". It was released on August 28, 2012, by Shady Records and Interscope Records. This would also be their only major label album before disbanding on April 26, 2018.

== Background ==
On February 9, 2012, Crooked I, in an interview with XXL, said that Eminem has been confirmed to feature on the album and provide most of the production, and Royce later stated that Eminem would mix the album. Alex da Kid, The Alchemist, J.U.S.T.I.C.E. League and No I.D. later were confirmed to produce on the album. The title of the album was announced in January 2012, before a tour that began on March 8 in Dallas and concluded May 10 in Nashville was also confirmed. Joe Budden has publicly said the group was abusing substances while recording the album.

=== Delay and mixtape ===
On June 4, on 106 & Park, Royce Da 5'9 stated that the album has been pushed back till July 2012, instead of June 12. Further delays led to a release date of August 28, 2012. On July 7, 2012, Royce announced in an interview with Jenny Boom Boom that the group will release a pre-album mixtape around the first week of August. Joe Budden revealed via Twitter that the mixtape is called On the House and will be hosted by DJ Drama. Royce Da 5'9" released the cover art for the mixtape through Twitter on August 7, 2012. A promotional video for the mixtape was released on August 6, 2012, and previewed a song called "See Dead People" with confirmed guest appearances by Eminem. Rapper Sauce Tha Boss, signed to Crooked I's COB label, claimed via Twitter that the mixtape will drop on Friday, August 10, 2012. This was not the case, however, the mixtape was released via DatPiff and DJ Drama on August 19, 2012.

== Singles ==
On February 27, 2012 Funkmaster Flex premiered "Hammer Dance", the lead single from the album, on New York's Hot 97 radio station. The song was produced by AraabMuzik. On March 13, the song was released through iTunes. On April 25, the group premiered "My Life", the second single from the album, which features Cee Lo Green and is produced by Streetrunner and Sarom. The song was released on iTunes on May 15, 2012. On June 29, the third single, "Throw It Away", was released, also on Hot 97, with Funkmaster Flex. The song features vocals from the American rapper Swizz Beatz and production from Mr. Porter. The single was later available to purchase on iTunes, on July 2, 2012. A video for the single was released on August 31, 2012. The group confirmed in an interview on BET Awards 2012 with Hip Hop Wired that the fourth single will be "Goodbye", produced by Boi-1da. "Goodbye" premiered on Shade 45 on August 9, 2012, during an interview with the group and Eminem. On August 14, the single was released on iTunes for digital download. On August 21, 2012 the fifth single, Throw That which features their executive producer Eminem, was released for digital download on iTunes.

== Guest appearances ==
On August 4, 2012, the track listing was confirmed with the guests appearances. Notably, Shady records label head Eminem appears on three tracks. Joining Mr. Mathers are Cee Lo Green, Busta Rhymes, Skylar Grey, Swizz Beatz and B.o.B. The producers on the album are AraabMuzik, Streetrunner, Sarom, Mr. Porter, Boi-1da, The Alchemist, J.U.S.T.I.C.E. League, No I.D., Alex da Kid, Hit-Boy, T-Minus, Black Key, Zukhan, Kane Beatz, and Eminem as the executive producer.

== Reception ==
=== Commercial performance ===
Welcome to: Our House was Slaughterhouse's most successful release to date, peaking at number two in the Billboard 200 and at Number One in the Billboard Top Rap Albums, selling 52,000 copies in the first week. As of January 2016, the album has sold 200,000 copies in the United States.

=== Critical response ===
Professional ratings
Aggregate scores
| Source | Rating |
|---|---|
| Metacritic | 70/100 |
Review scores
| Source | Rating |
| Allmusic | 3.5/5 stars |
| Exclaim! | 8/10 stars |
| HipHopDX | 4.5/5 stars |
| RapReviews | 8/10 |
| Rolling Stone | 3/5 stars |
| Spin | 7/10 |
| XXL | 4/5 stars |

Welcome to: Our House received generally positive reviews from contemporary music critics. At Metacritic, which assigns a normalized rating out of 100 to reviews from mainstream critics, the album received an average score of 70, which indicates "generally favorable reviews", based on 10 reviews. HipHopDX's editor Slava Kuperstein reviewed the album, and gave it 4.5 out of 5. Kuperstein says: "With welcome to: OUR HOUSE, Slaughterhouse has somehow managed to improve upon its already-absurd skill set." RapReviews review was written by Steve Juon, who said: "The debut was unexpectedly good and remains a classic. The official sequel to it was EXPECTED to be good and it is." In a mixed review, written by Jody RosenThe from the magazine Rolling Stone, was said "the group's second LP is a showcase for gritty traditionalism". The review had the lowest score. Allmusic's editor David Jeffries has criticized the album saying: "Crotch-grabbing tracks might crash into a convincing emo-rap number and these proven wordsmiths might have left more room for guests and hooks than they probably should have, but just because their indie debut was a more cohesive showcase doesn't mean the joy and pain of Welcome to Our House isn't worth the required sorting."

On September 5, 2012, Mark Bozzer from Canadian music magazine Exclaim! made a positive review of the album, saying "Joe, Joell, Crooked I and Royce trade quality rhymes over a varied catalogue of original productions that allow the four-piece ample room to spit their different brands of venom." The magazine XXL reviewed the album with their editor Adam Fleischer. Fleischer said: "There's rarely a weak bar on welcome to: OUR HOUSE, though the verbal dexterity isn't quite as stunning as it was on their debut." Music magazine Spin reviewed the album on September 5, 2012, and their editor Phillip Mlynar commented about album: "Despite this abundance of raps about the unadulterated greatness of rapping, the Slaughterhouse four pull it off with extraordinary sincerity, and Our House avoids devolving into some tired treatise about how these guys make "real hip-hop" and other rappers don't." Nathan S. from the website DJ Booth reviewed the album, saying: "At 16 tracks, 20 on the deluxe version, this album manages to work in more than a couple joints featuring some of the vicious rap hardcore fans were hoping for."

== Track listing ==
| No. | Title | Writer(s) | Producer(s) | Length |
|---|---|---|---|---|
| 1. | "The Slaughter" (Intro) | Marvin O'Neil | Eminem | 1:16 |
| 2. | "Our House" (featuring Eminem and Skylar Grey) | Ryan Montgomery; Joell Ortiz; Dominick Wickliffe; Marshall Mathers; Holly Hafferman; Alexander Grant | Alex da Kid | 5:58 |
| 3. | "Coffin" (featuring Busta Rhymes) | Montgomery; Ortiz; Wickliffe; Joe Budden; Trevor Smith; Chauncey Hollis | Hit-Boy; Eminem^{[b]} | 3:41 |
| 4. | "Throw That" (featuring Eminem) | Montgomery; Ortiz; Wickliffe; Budden; Mathers; Tyler Williams; Luther Campbell; David Hobbs; Mark Ross; Christopher Wong won; James Brown; Robert Ginyard | T-Minus; Eminem^{[b]} | 3:57 |
| 5. | "Hammer Dance" | Montgomery; Ortiz; Wickliffe; Budden; Abraham Orellana; Jonathan Davis; Reginald Arvizu; James Shaffer; David Silveria; Brian Welch | AraabMuzik; Eminem^{[a]} | 3:43 |
| 6. | "Get Up" | Montgomery; Ortiz; Wickliffe; Budden; Ernest Wilson; Antony Genn; Martin Slattery | No I.D.; Eminem^{[a]} | 5:01 |
| 7. | "My Life" (featuring Cee Lo Green) | Montgomery; Ortiz; Wickliffe; Budden; Nicholas Warwar; Raymond Diaz; M. Aiello; Mike Gaffey; Francesco Bontempi; Annerley Gordon; Giorgio Spagna; Peter Glenister; Thomas Callaway | Streetrunner; Raymond "Sarom" Diaz; Eminem^{[b]} | 4:21 |
| 8. | "We Did It" (Skit) | | Eminem | 0:41 |
| 9. | "Flip a Bird" | Montgomery; Ortiz; Wickliffe; Budden; Imogen Heap | Black Key Beats; Zukhan; Eminem^{[b]} | 4:20 |
| 10. | "Throw It Away" (featuring Swizz Beatz) | Montgomery; Ortiz; Wickliffe; Budden; Denaun Porter; Renee Scroggins; Kasseem Dean | Mr. Porter; Eminem^{[a]} | 4:15 |
| 11. | "Rescue Me" (featuring Skylar Grey) | Montgomery; Ortiz; Wickliffe; Budden; Hafferman; Grant | Alex da Kid | 3:39 |
| 12. | "Frat House" | Montgomery; Ortiz; Wickliffe; Budden; Nikhil Seetharam; Williams | T-Minus; Eminem^{[b]} | 3:48 |
| 13. | "Goodbye" | Ortiz; Wickliffe; Budden; Matthew Samuels; Matthew Burnett; I. Perez | Boi-1da; Matthew Burnett^{[a]}; Eminem^{[b]} | 5:02 |
| 14. | "Park It Sideways" | Montgomery; Ortiz; Wickliffe; Budden; Guillermo Astrain; Igor Escudero; Unai Lazcano; E. De La Granja; Daniel Johnson; Jeremy Coleman; Ashanti Floyd | Kane Beatz; JMIKE^{[b]}; Ashanti "The Mad Violinist" Floyd^{[b]}; Eminem^{[a]} | 3:56 |
| 15. | "Die" | Montgomery; Ortiz; Wickliffe; Budden; Porter; Tony "56" Jackson; Andi Toma; Sly Jordan | Mr. Porter | 5:04 |
| 16. | "Our Way" (Outro) | Montgomery; Ortiz; Wickliffe; Budden; Samuels; Zale Epstein; Brett Kruger | Boi-1da; The Maven Boys^{[b]}; Eminem^{[b]} | 5:39 |
| Total length: | | | | 1:04:22 |

Deluxe version
| No. | Title | Writer(s) | Producer(s) | Length |
|---|---|---|---|---|
| 17. | "Asylum" (featuring Eminem) | Montgomery; Ortiz; Wickliffe; Mathers; Luis Resto | Eminem; Luis Resto^{[a]} | 4:02 |
| 18. | "Walk of Shame" | Montgomery; Ortiz; Wickliffe; Budden; Warwar; Diaz; M. Aiello; M. Hayward; Russell Marsden; Emma Richardson | Streetrunner; Raymond "Sarom" Diaz; I.L.O; Eminem^{[b]} | 4:06 |
| 19. | "The Other Side" | Montgomery; Ortiz; Budden; Eric Ortiz; Kevin Crowe; Kenny Bartolomei; M. Franklin; M. Primous | J.U.S.T.I.C.E. League | 4:09 |
| 20. | "Place to Be" (featuring B.o.B) | Montgomery; Ortiz; Wickliffe; Budden; Jason Boyd; Daniel Johnson; Coleman | Kane Beatz; JMIKE; Eminem^{[b]} | 3:54 |
| Total length: | | | | 1:20:30 |

Notes

- ^{^a} signifies an additional producer.
- ^{^b} signifies a co-producer.

Sample credits

- "Hammer Dance" samples "Falling Away from Me" performed by Korn.
- "Get Up" samples "Ali In the Jungle" performed by The Hours.
- "My Life" samples "The Rhythm of the Night" performed by Corona.
- "Flip a Bird" samples "Little Bird" performed by Imogen Heap.
- "Throw It Away" samples "UFO" performed by ESG.
- "Park It Sideways" samples "Real Love" performed by Delorean.
- "Walk of Shame" samples "Light of the Morning" performed by Band of Skulls.

== Personnel ==
Credits for Welcome to: Our House adapted from AllMusic.

- M. Aiello - Composer
- AraabMuzik - Producer
- Reginald "Fieldy" Arvizu - Composer
- Black Key Beats - Producer
- Boi-1da - Producer
- T-Minus - Producer
- F. Bontempi - Composer
- Cullen Brooks - Assistant Engineer
- Matthew Burnett - Additional Production, Composer
- Busta Rhymes - Featured Artist
- Tony Campana - Engineer
- J. Coleman - Composer
- Jonathan Davis - Composer
- James "Munky" Shaffer - Composer
- Mickey Davis - Engineer
- Denaun - Vocals, Producer
- Dennis Dennehy - Marketing, Publicity
- Raymond "Sarom" Diaz - Producer
- DJ Mormile - A&R
- Eminem - Additional Production, Executive Producer, Featured Artist, Mixing, Producer
- Keith Ferguson - Guitar
- John Fisher - Studio Manager
- Ashanti "The Mad Violinist" Floyd - Producer
- Brian "Big Bass" Gardner - Mastering
- P. Glenister - Composer
- Alicia Graham - A&R
- A. Grant - Composer
- B.o.B - Featured Artist
- Cee-Lo Green - Featured Artist
- Skylar Grey - Featured Artist, Composer
- Chad Griffith - Photography
- Hit-Boy - Producer
- Stephanie Hsu - Creative Art
- Tony "56" Jackson - Keyboards
- J-MIKE - Producer
- Joe Strange - Assistant Engineer, Engineer
- D. Johnson - Composer
- Selena Jordan - Vocals
- Sly Jordan - Composer, Vocals
- Kane Beatz - Producer
- Alex Da Kid - Mixing, Producer
- Marc Labelle - Project Coordinator
- Edgar Luna - Engineer
- M. Gaffey - Composer
- Deborah Mannis-Gardner - Sample Clearance
- Graham Marsh - Engineer
- Marvwon - Rap
- Justine Massa - Creative Coordinator
- Maven Boys - Producer
- Alex Merzin - Engineer
- R. Montgomery - Composer
- Riggs Morales - A&R
- No I.D. - Producer
- J. Ortiz - Composer
- Dart Parker - A&R
- Luis Resto - Keyboards
- M. Samuels - Composer
- Jason Sangerman - Marketing
- Mike Saputo - Art Direction, Design
- R. Scroggins - Composer
- Les Scurry - Production Coordination
- Feras "Ferrari" Sheika - Engineer
- David Silveria - Composer
- M. Slattery - Composer
- Manny Smith - A&R
- T. Smith - Composer
- G. Spagna - Composer
- Miguel Starcevich - Back Cover Photo
- Mike Strange - Engineer, Keyboards, Mixing
- N. "Streetrunner" Warwar - Composer, Producer
- Swizz Beatz - Featured Artist
- Brian "Head" Welch - Composer
- Ryan West - Mixing
- D. Wickliffe - Composer

== Charts ==
=== Weekly charts ===
| Chart (2012) | Peak position |
|---|---|
| Canadian Albums (Billboard) | 4 |
| Dutch Albums (Album Top 100) | 90 |
| Scottish Albums (OCC) | 42 |
| Swiss Albums (Schweizer Hitparade) | 76 |
| UK Albums (OCC) | 33 |
| UK Album Downloads (OCC) | 22 |
| UK R&B Albums (OCC) | 2 |
| US Billboard 200 | 2 |
| US Top R&B/Hip-Hop Albums (Billboard) | 1 |
| US Top Rap Albums (Billboard) | 1 |
| US Indie Store Album Sales (Billboard) | 1 |

=== Year-end charts ===
| Chart (2012) | Position |
|---|---|
| US Top R&B/Hip-Hop Albums (Billboard) | 61 |

== Release history ==
List of release date, showing country, and record label
| Region | Date | Label | Ref |
|---|---|---|---|
| Canada | August 28, 2012 | Shady, Interscope | |
| United Kingdom | August 24, 2012 | Shady, Interscope | |
| United States | August 28, 2012 | Shady, Interscope | |
