= Slaughterhouse (Slaughterhouse album) =

Studio album by Slaughterhouse
- Released: August 11, 2009
- Recorded: 2009
- Genre: Hip-hop
- Length: 56:23
- Label: E1 Music
- Producer: The Alchemist; DJ Khalil; StreetRunner; Mr. Porter; Filthy Rockwell; Emile; Focus...; RealSon

Slaughterhouse chronology
Slaughterhouse (2009)	Slaughterhouse EP (2011)

Singles from Slaughterhouse
- 1. "The One" Released: July 2, 2009; 2. "Microphone" Released: November 24, 2009

Slaughterhouse is the self-titled debut studio album by American hip-hop supergroup, Slaughterhouse, consisting of members Crooked I, Joe Budden, Joell Ortiz and Royce da 5'9". It was released on August 11, 2009, by E1 Music and sold 18,600 copies in its first week.

== Background ==
In June 2009, E1 Music announced the album. The group came together when Joe Budden was working on a song for his Halfway House album and enlisted the services of Crooked I, Joell Ortiz and Royce da 5'9" for a song entitled "Slaughterhouse". Inspired by the vibe of track and the immediate chemistry of the four rappers, a plan was immediately made to form the supergroup.

=== Delay ===
The album release date was changed from July 7 to August 11. Royce da 5'9" said that the group wanted more time to put into set up and marketing with its label E1 Music. On his interview with AllHipHop on June 12, Royce told: "Even though this [group] is a new way of doing business, we still gotta stick to the old school script when it comes time to market this, to have the proper time to set up a record. We're not idiots. We understand the concept of labels throwing something against the wall and seeing if it sticks. That's not what we are in business to do. We're still in the business of selling records, because we feel we have a great product to present to the public."

The Detroit rapper also stated that the lyrics and the music came together in a way that made them want to generate maximum interest in the self-titled début. Royce continued: "All the push back has to do [with] is the set up. It's great music. My biggest concern with making the project is us picking the best beats possible. Rhyming is there. The best music possible is what I was always concerned with, that's why a lot of songs came out so good." Joell Ortiz, a Brooklyn-bred artist who himself is a member of Slaughterhouse, said that the process of creating the album was arduous, yet fun. "It was definitely the busiest session I had ever been in my life. To come out with the product that we do have, was ridiculous."

On June 16 via SOHH, the group apologized to their fans and assured them there would be no more delays.

=== Music ===
The album features production from Focus..., the Alchemist, DJ Khalil, Streetrunner, D12's Mr. Porter and more. On June 18, 2009, a street single was released via Joe Budden's Twitter. The track is "Woodstock (Hood Hop)" which is produced by Nottz and features M.O.P. on the hook. The first official single from the album was "The One". The video, shot and directed by Rik Cordero, premiered on July 12 online and on MTV2 Sucka Free & MTV Jams hourly. Royce confirmed that Pharoahe Monch and Novel are set to appear on the album.

The album cover features each member wearing a sports team's logo from another member's hometown. Joell Ortiz's hat is supposed to be a Detroit Tigers hat but is blacked out.

== Reception ==
After three weeks the album had managed to sell 28,000 copies.

Professional ratings
Aggregate scores
Source	Rating
Metacritic	69/100
Review scores
Source	Rating
About.com	4/5 stars
AllMusic	4/5 stars
AllHipHop	(8/10)
Okayplayer	(89/100)
PopMatters	7/10 medals
RapReviews	(9/10)
Pitchfork	(5.5/10)
Sputnikmusic	3/5
XXL	4/5 (XL)

Reviews of the album were favorable. It has a score of 69 out of an overall score of 100 (calculated by only 9 reviews) on Metacritic, stating that the album has "generally favorable reviews".

Allmusic.com gave it a four out of five stars stating that:

Well-chosen guests like Fatman Scoop and Pharoahe Monch increase the thug appeal while earthshaking productions from the Alchemist, DJ Khalil, and Mr. Porter seal the deal.

RapReviews gave it a 9 out of 10 stars. they stated:

Whether you want to doubt it or not, there's just too much right about the self-titled Slaughterhouse for this album to be wrong.

XXL gave it XL out of XXL stating:

Evidenced by the chemistry on their first effort, Slaughterhouse is no reality-show-created supergroup. And while each member may be a little movement by himself, without a doubt, they're a force when they're together.

HipHopDX gave it a four out of five stars stated :

Considering that most groups comprised of previously-established artists never amount to anything, the fact that Slaughterhouse is even out on shelves is a triumph. But rather than rest on their laurels and ride on the success (however limited) of their solo careers to get them through the album, it's evident that Royce, Budden, Crooked and Joell rhyme like they've still got something to prove. Their formula hasn't been perfected yet; but the talent, and (most importantly) the will are there, which is a promising indicator of things to come.

About.com has said that:

After a thorough journey through the minds of these four MCs, you'll be left with the realization that Slaughterhouse embodies mind-bending refractions from an era when hip-hop's top MCs experimented with a whole arsenal of concepts.

It's refreshing to see four individually acclaimed wordsmiths working together for the sheer purpose of rewiring hip-hop's current disposition while staying true to the game's fundamentals. With consistency and more variety, Slaughterhouse could become your new favorite group.

== Track listing ==
No.	Title	Writer(s)	Producer(s)	Length
1.	"Sound Off"	Joseph Budden; Ryan Montgomery; Joell Ortiz; Dominick Wickliffe; Nicholas Warwar	StreetRunner	5:51
2.	"Lyrical Murderers" (featuring K-Young)	Bernard Edwards Jr; Budden; Montgomery; Ortiz; Wickliffe	Focus...	4:04
3.	"Microphone"	Alan Daniel Maman; Budden; Montgomery; Ortiz; Wickliffe	The Alchemist	4:42
4.	"Not Tonight"	Budden; Montgomery; Ortiz; Warwar; Wickliffe	StreetRunner	3:39
5.	"The One" (featuring The New Royales)	Budden; Chin Injeti; Erik Alcock; Khalil Abdul-Rahman; Liz Rodrigues; Montgomery; Ortiz; Wickliffe	DJ Khalil	3:37
6.	"In the Mind of Madness" (Skit)			1:23
7.	"Cuckoo"	Budden; Montgomery; Ortiz; Rahman; Wickliffe	DJ Khalil	4:30
8.	"The Phone Call" (Skit)			1:01
9.	"Onslaught 2" (featuring Fatman Scoop)	Budden; Emile Haynie; Isaac Freeman III; Montgomery; Ortiz; Wickliffe	Emile	4:27
10.	"The Phone Call 2" (Skit)			0:58
11.	"Salute" (featuring Pharoahe Monch)	Budden; Denaun Porter; Montgomery; Ortiz; Troy Donald Jamerson; Wickliffe	Mr. Porter	4:31
12.	"Pray (It's a Shame)"	Aiko Rohd; Budden; Montgomery; Ortiz; Wickliffe	RealSon	3:53
13.	"Cut You Loose"	Budden; Montgomery; Ortiz; Porter; Wickliffe	Mr. Porter	4:43
14.	"Raindrops" (featuring Novel)	Alonzo Mario Stevenson; Budden; Horrus Turner; Montgomery; Ortiz; Robert Brookins; Travis Marcus Haynes; Wickliffe	Filthy Rockwell	5:00
15.	"Killaz" (featuring Melanie Rutherford and C. Brown)	Budden; Haynie; Melanie Rutherford; Montgomery; Ortiz; Wickliffe	Emile	4:09

iTunes bonus track
No.	Title	Writer(s)	Producer(s)	Length
16.	"Fight Klub"	Bryan Fryzel; Budden; Montgomery; Ortiz; Wickliffe	Frequency	4:42

=== Sample credits ===
- "Sound Off" - Contains a samples of "It's Too Late" by The Stylistics
- "Microphone" - Contains a samples of "L'alpagueur" by Michel Colombier
- "Not Tonight" - Contains a samples of "I Don't Know Why I Love You" by Thelma Houston
- "The One" - Contains a samples of "I'm Still #1" by Boogie Down Productions, "Janie's Got a Gun" by Aerosmith and "Fly Away" by Lenny Kravitz
- "Pray (It's a Shame)" - Contains a samples of "It's a Shame" by The Spinners
- "Cut You Loose" - Contains a samples of "You're No Good" by The Harvey Averne Dozen

== Charts ==
Chart (2009)	Peak position	Sales
U.S. Billboard 200	25	44,000+
U.S. Top Digital Albums	9	
U.S. Top Independent Albums	2	
U.S. Top Rap Albums	2	
U.S. Top R&B/Hip-Hop Albums	4	
