= Rik Cordero =

American film director and musician (born 1979)

- Born: Fredric Joseph Cordero; 1979 (age 46–47)
- Origin: Queens, New York, United States
- Years active: 2007–present
- Website: Official Website

Rik Cordero (born 1979 as Fredric Joseph Cordero) is an American film director and musician. Cordero was born and raised in Queens, New York and is known for applying unusual, non-traditional shooting methods in his work. He was nominated for Video Director Of The Year at the 2009 BET Awards and was the recipient of the Best Film Award for his feature film, Inside A Change which made its world premiere at the 2009 HBO NYILFF. In 2010, Cordero was featured in Sprite's print and television ads for their Spark campaign and directed The World Is Watching, a documentary about the culture of New York City high school basketball produced by Nike and narrated by Spike Lee.

In 2011 Cordero was a featured director for SHOOT Magazine's 9th Annual New Director's Showcase held at the DGA Theater and was also a recipient of an American Advertising Federation Mosaic Award for the US Marine Corps Where I'm From national campaign (JWT/Uniworld). In 2012 he was named one of the 100 Most Influential Artists of the Complex Decade by Complex Magazine and was nominated for a Best Hip Hop Music Video Award for AK-69's Start It Again at the 2013 MTV Japan Video Music Awards.

His big break came when he shot a teaser trailer for Blue Magic, the first visual off Jay-Z's concept album American Gangster. The teaser created a viral buzz online and the results were millions of online impressions and views which ultimately helped the album to reach numerous top 10 lists by the end of 2007.

His client list includes, amongst other artists, Jay-Z, Nas, Action Bronson, The Roots and Wu-Tang Clan and brands such as Coca-Cola, PepsiCo, Nike, Levi Strauss & Co., MillerCoors, LG, and Heineken International.

He is currently signed to First Wave Entertainment for U.S. Commercial Representation headed by executive producer Justin Havlik. He graduated from New York Institute of Technology.
