= Slaughterhouse (group) =

American hip-hop group

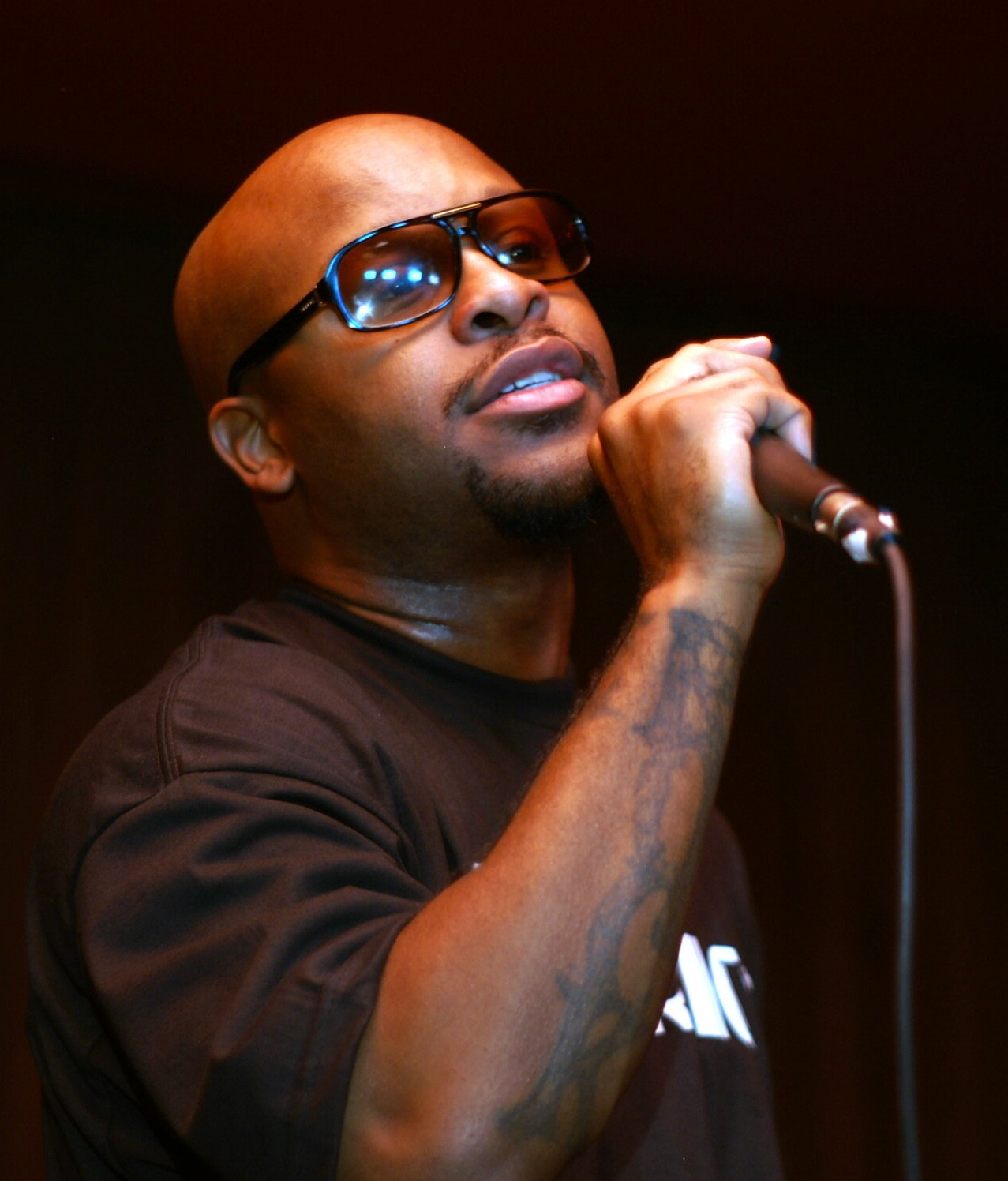
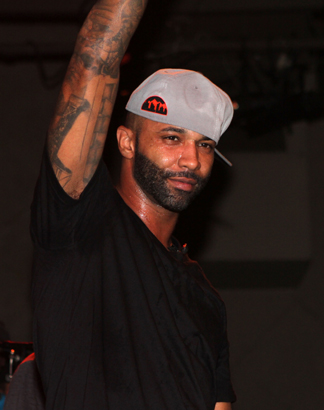
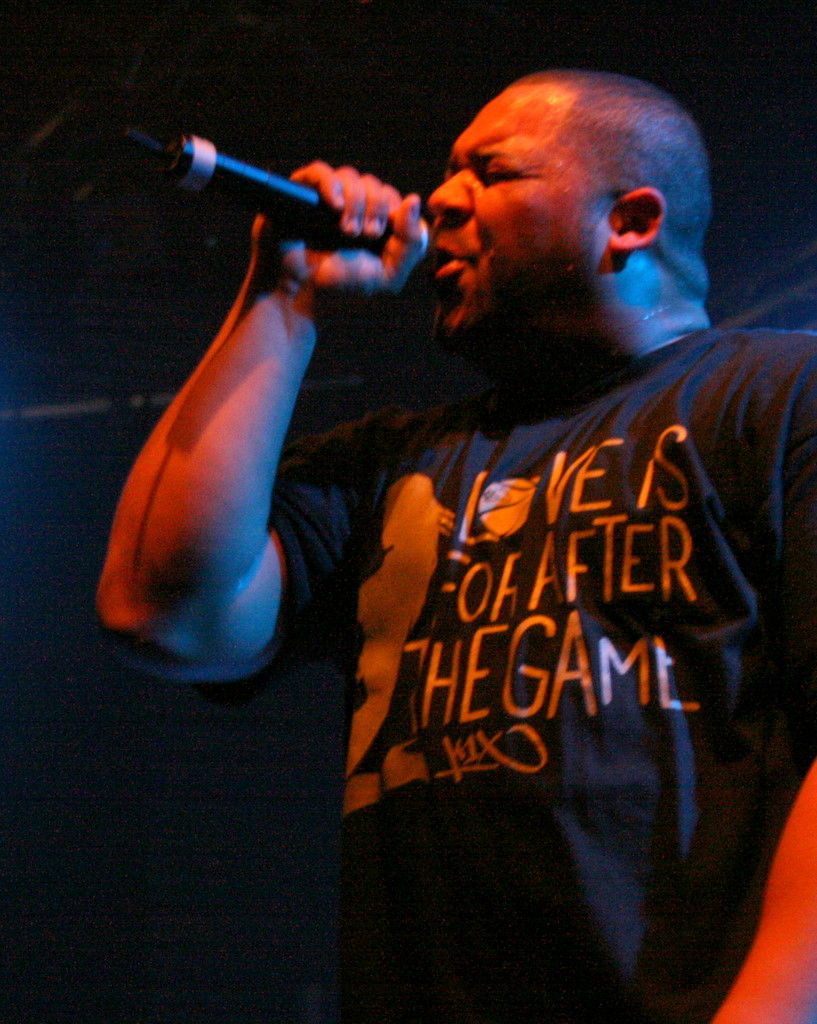
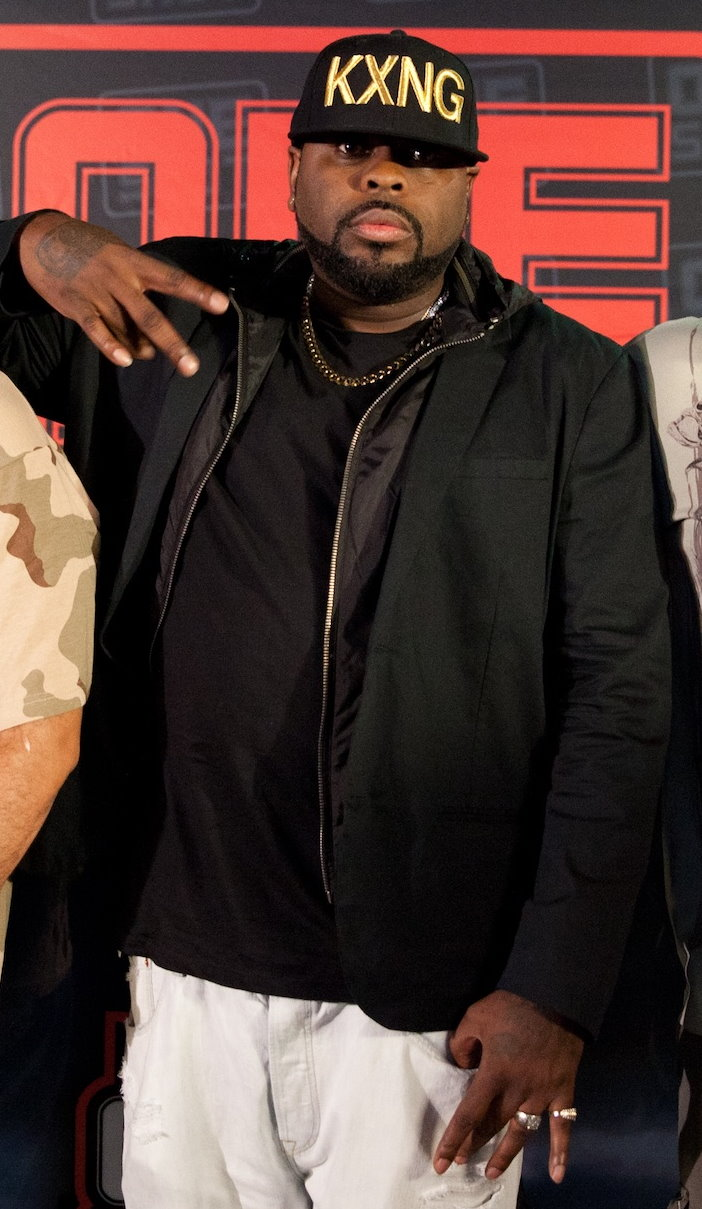
- Clockwise from top: Royce da 5'9", Joe Budden, Kxng Crooked, Joell Ortiz

Background information
- Origin: United States
- Genre: Hip-hop
- Years active: 2008–2018
- Labels: E1; Shady; Interscope
- Past members: Joell Ortiz; Kxng Crooked; Royce da 5'9"; Joe Budden
- Website: slaughterhouseweb.com

Slaughterhouse was an American hip-hop supergroup consisting of rappers Joe Budden, Joell Ortiz, Kxng Crooked, and Royce da 5'9". They released their eponymous debut studio album independently in 2009, and signed to Shady Records, an imprint of Interscope Records to release its follow up, Welcome to: Our House in 2012. The group disbanded in 2018.

== History ==
=== 2008: Formation ===
The group formed in late 2008 after Crooked I, Joell Ortiz, Royce da 5'9", and Joe Budden appeared on the song "Slaughterhouse" from Joe Budden's album Halfway House. They decided to form a group and named the group after the song. The members of Slaughterhouse all share some degree of controversy from their past in the music industry. All four address these issues in the song "Move On".

=== 2009–2010: Debut album ===
Their self-titled debut album was released on August 11, 2009. The album was recorded over a six-day period in early June. The album features production from Focus, The Alchemist, DJ Khalil, StreetRunner and Mr. Porter of D12. On June 18, 2009, the first street single off the album was released via Joe Budden's Twitter account. The track was "Woodstock (Hood Hop)" and features M.O.P. on the hook. The first official single from the album was "The One". A second video for the song "Microphone" was also released in late 2009. A video directed by Rik Cordero.

Their debut album sold 18,000 copies in its first week (Only 20,000 copies were shipped to stores). As of September 5, 2009 the album has sold 31,000 copies.

The group initially planned for their second album to release in 2010, tentatively named by Crooked I as No Muzzle. In late 2009, however, Royce da 5'9" confirmed talks between the group and Shady Records, stating that he felt their second album should be released on a major label.

=== 2011–2012: Shady Records and Welcome to: Our House ===
As rumors of a Shady Records/Slaughterhouse signing spread, in March 2010, Joell Ortiz posted a rant on Twitter denigrating E1 Entertainment for blocking Shady negotiations, implying that another party was involved as well. Responding to a disgruntled Amalgam Digital executive's allegations against him, Joe Budden confirmed that complications regarding E1 and Amalgam were the reason the deal had not been completed previously. Royce da 5'9" would later name-drop Shady Records in a Bar Exam 3 freestyle, and the group released a song entitled "Beamer, Benz or Bentley (ShadyMegaMix)", while still with E1. Slaughterhouse, minus Joe Budden, were featured on the iTunes deluxe edition of Eminem's Recovery album on the track "Session One", while they were still with E1. The group also featured on "Loud Noises" on Hell: The Sequel (2011), a collaborative EP between Royce and Eminem.

Plans to release an EP were revealed by HipHopDX in June 2010, tentatively titled Slaughterhouse EP. The EP was released on February 8, 2011, with four new tracks and two remixes by Frequency of tracks previously released. On January 12, 2011, it was confirmed that the group officially signed to Shady Records, along with Yelawolf. Both acts appeared along with Eminem on the cover of XXL magazine's March 2011 edition.

A year later, the group was featured on the cover of the July/August issue of The Source magazine in anticipation of their Shady Records debut. On July 7, 2012, Royce announced in an interview with 11Jenny Boom Boom22 that the group will release a pre-album mixtape around the first week of August. Shortly after, they released the song "Throw It Away", produced by Swizz Beatz, as the albums first promotional single. Joe Budden revealed via Twitter that the mixtape is called On The House and will be hosted by DJ Drama. A promotional video for the mixtape was released on August 6, 2012, and previewed a song called "See Dead People", with confirmed guest appearances on the mixtape by Eminem and Black Hippy. On August 16, Slaughterhouse released a new track, "Truth or Truth". The Mixtape On the House was released on Aug.19th. Slaughterhouse released their second studio album Welcome to: Our House, the first to be released under Shady Records, on August 28, 2012. As of November 23, 2012, it has sold 146,000 copies in the US. Budden has admitted to the group abusing substances during the recording of the album however saying the whole group is sober and ready for their third album.

=== 2013–2018: Glass House and split ===
In May 2013, Slaughterhouse confirmed that they had put their solo projects on hold, and had begun recording for their third studio album. The album will be executive produced by Just Blaze and contains production by J.U.S.T.I.C.E. League, Cardiak, Illmind, AraabMuzik and DJ Premier. In November 2013, Joe Budden confirmed that the album would be released in early 2014. At the time he also stated that Action Bronson would be featured on the album, and they had yet to work with Eminem on it. On May 21, 2014, the group released their second mixtape titled House Rules, which featured 10 tracks with production from Nottz, AraabMuzik, DJ Pain 1, The Heatmakerz, Illmind, Harry Fraud among others. On February 19, 2015, Royce da 5'9" had confirmed that the album was "pretty close to being done", and that the group, along with Eminem were "nitpicking at it". He had hoped for a summer release date for the album. On February 7, 2017, Joe Budden confirmed on his podcast that the album will never be released

In April 2018, KXNG Crooked announced via Instagram his departure from Slaughterhouse and confirmed that Glass House "exists" but without a release date. He said there were no harsh feelings about his departure: it was "all love". Joell Ortiz and Royce da 5'9" commented on the announcement with respect and support. On April 26, 2018, Royce da 5’9” announced that the supergroup had officially disbanded.

=== 2018–present: Aftermath ===
In September 2018, Eminem released a four-part interview with Sway Calloway on his YouTube channel explaining the reasons why the group had a downfall.

Where we had left it, about two years ago, was everybody came in, and some of the guys in the group picked certain beats, some of guys didn't feel those beats [...] There was definitely enough songs to put an album out, but for the most part, it wasn't a complete picture, because everybody wasn't on the same page of what their favorite songs were. So I thought they were gonna go back, regroup, and try to make few more songs. [...] Joe said 'Slaughterhouse ain't hot right now, we don't have a buzz, we need to put out a mixtape.' From that point, everybody started branching out, Royce went and did his album, PRhyme, everybody started doing their own solo shit.

In January 2020, former group members Royce da 5'9", KXNG Crooked, and Joell Ortiz were featured on Eminem's eleventh studio album, Music to Be Murdered By, on the track "I Will".

In February 2022, KXNG Crooked and Joell Ortiz announced a collaborative studio album titled Rise & Fall of Slaughterhouse, in which they addressed the group's fallout from their own perspectives. Royce da 5'9" and Joe Budden were displeased with the project, as they viewed it as an attempt to tear down the Slaughterhouse brand for financial gain without consent from the rest of the group. On March 8, following a heated exchange between Royce, Budden, and Ortiz on Instagram Live, KXNG Crooked gave further explanation about the situation, saying that he and Ortiz tried to get the group together for years but were unsuccessful, mainly due to Budden's lack of interest and cooperation, and that he and Ortiz wanted to make one final project to give their fans some closure.

== Discography ==
Studio albums

- Slaughterhouse (2009)
- Welcome to: Our House (2012)
