= Royce da 5'9" =

American rapper (born 1977)

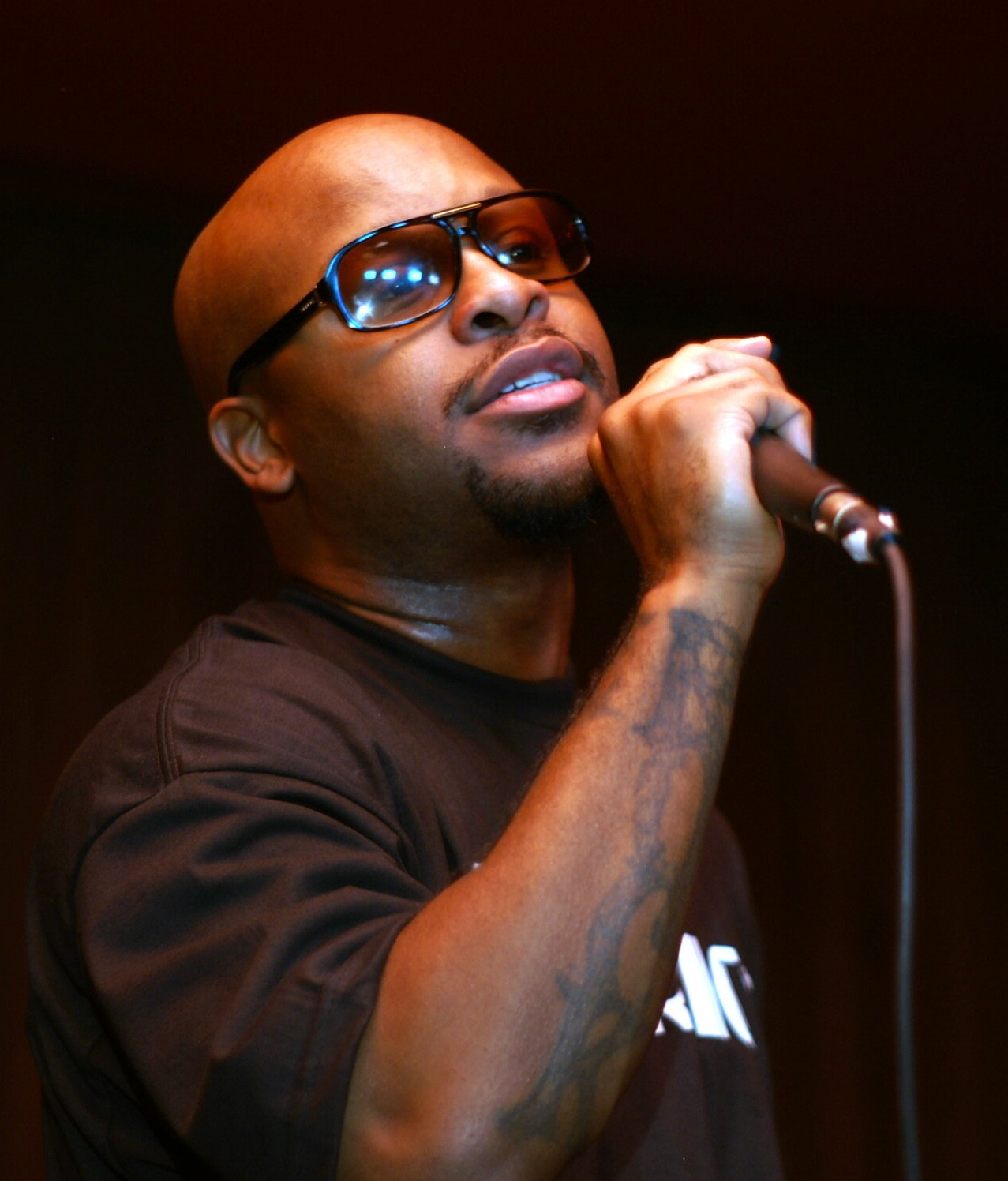
- Royce da 5'9" performing in 2008

Background information
- Also known as: Nickel Nine; Nickle; Royce 5'9"; R-Dog; Bad
- Born: Ryan Daniel Montgomery; July 5, 1977 (age 49); Detroit, Michigan, U.S.
- Education: Oak Park High School
- Height: 5 ft 9 in (175 cm)
- Genre: Midwestern hip-hop
- Occupations: Rapper; songwriter; record producer
- Works: Discography; production
- Years active: 1995–present
- Labels: Heaven Studios; Bad Half; Gracie; One; M.I.C. (Make It Count); Columbia; Tommy Boy; E1; GAME; Sure Shot
- Member of: PRhyme
- Formerly of: Bad Meets Evil; Slaughterhouse

Ryan Daniel Montgomery (born July 5, 1977), known professionally as Royce da 5'9" (or simply Royce 5'9"), is an American rapper. Best known for his association with fellow Detroit rapper Eminem, the two met in 1997 and formed the hip hop duo Bad Meets Evil the following year. Their 2011 single, "Lighters" (featuring Bruno Mars), peaked at number four on the Billboard Hot 100 and preceded the release of their debut extended play (EP), Hell: The Sequel (2011). The song and EP—which debuted atop the Billboard 200—have both yielded Montgomery's furthest commercial success.

Montgomery first embarked on a solo career with his debut studio album, Rock City in 2002; originally slated for release the year prior, disputes with Columbia Records led it to an independent release. He self-released eight follow-up studio albums each to critical acclaim; his latest, The Allegory (2020), earned Montgomery his first Grammy Award nomination for Best Rap Album in 2021. He also formed the hip hop supergroup Slaughterhouse with Joe Budden, Joell Ortiz and Kxng Crooked in 2008. Active for a decade, the group released two studio albums—Slaughterhouse (2009) and Welcome to: Our House (2012)—to commercial success. In 2014, he formed the hip hop duo PRhyme in 2014, with producer DJ Premier; they have released two albums.

== Early life ==
In an interview with DJ Vlad, Royce stated that his first stage name was "R-Dog", which was short-lived. He moved to Oak Park, Michigan when he was ten years old, later acquiring the nickname "Royce" in high school after wearing a chain with an R pendant resembling the Rolls-Royce symbol. Royce's name comes from his height, 5 feet 9 inches (175 cm), but the numbers five and nine have been in his life numerous times as he "found his calling" as a rapper in 1995 and in his song "Tabernacle" he discusses his grandmother dying on the fifth floor of a hospital and his first son being born on the ninth.

He started rapping at age 18, influenced mainly by Ras Kass, Redman, Tupac Shakur, The Notorious B.I.G., Esham, Heltah Skeltah, LL Cool J, Nas, Jay-Z, Detroit's Most Wanted, and N.W.A.

== Career ==
=== 1997–2001: Early years and Rock City ===
Through his manager Kino Childrey, Royce was introduced to fellow Detroit rapper Eminem on December 29, 1997. The two formed a duo, Bad Meets Evil, and released several tracks together. On August 20, 1998, they appeared on The Stretch Armstrong and Bobbito Show for the first time. Royce appeared on Eminem's debut studio album The Slim Shady LP (1999), in which he was featured on a song called "Bad Meets Evil". They later collaborated on the track "Renegade", from which Royce's vocals would later be replaced with Jay-Z's on the latter's The Blueprint. Through Eminem, Royce was introduced to both Dr. Dre and execs at Game Recordings, but they parted ways after Royce refused Dre's request that he cut ties with Childrey.

Royce signed his first recording contract in 1998, a $1-million deal with Tommy Boy Records. He had rejected an offer beforehand from Dr. Dre's Aftermath Entertainment of $250,000 and unlimited beats, a move that he called his "biggest regret" in a 2016 interview with Complex. After Tommy Boy Records shut down, he signed a deal with Columbia and Game Recordings where he started recording an album called Rock City, referring to Detroit's former status as home to Motown Records. When the project was heavily bootlegged, Royce was dropped from Columbia in early 2002; he later signed to Koch, where he re-recorded some of the album, eventually releasing it on November 29 as Rock City (Version 2.0). Despite poor album sales, the DJ Premier-produced single "Boom" gained Royce some underground recognition and eventually resulted in the two working together more closely.

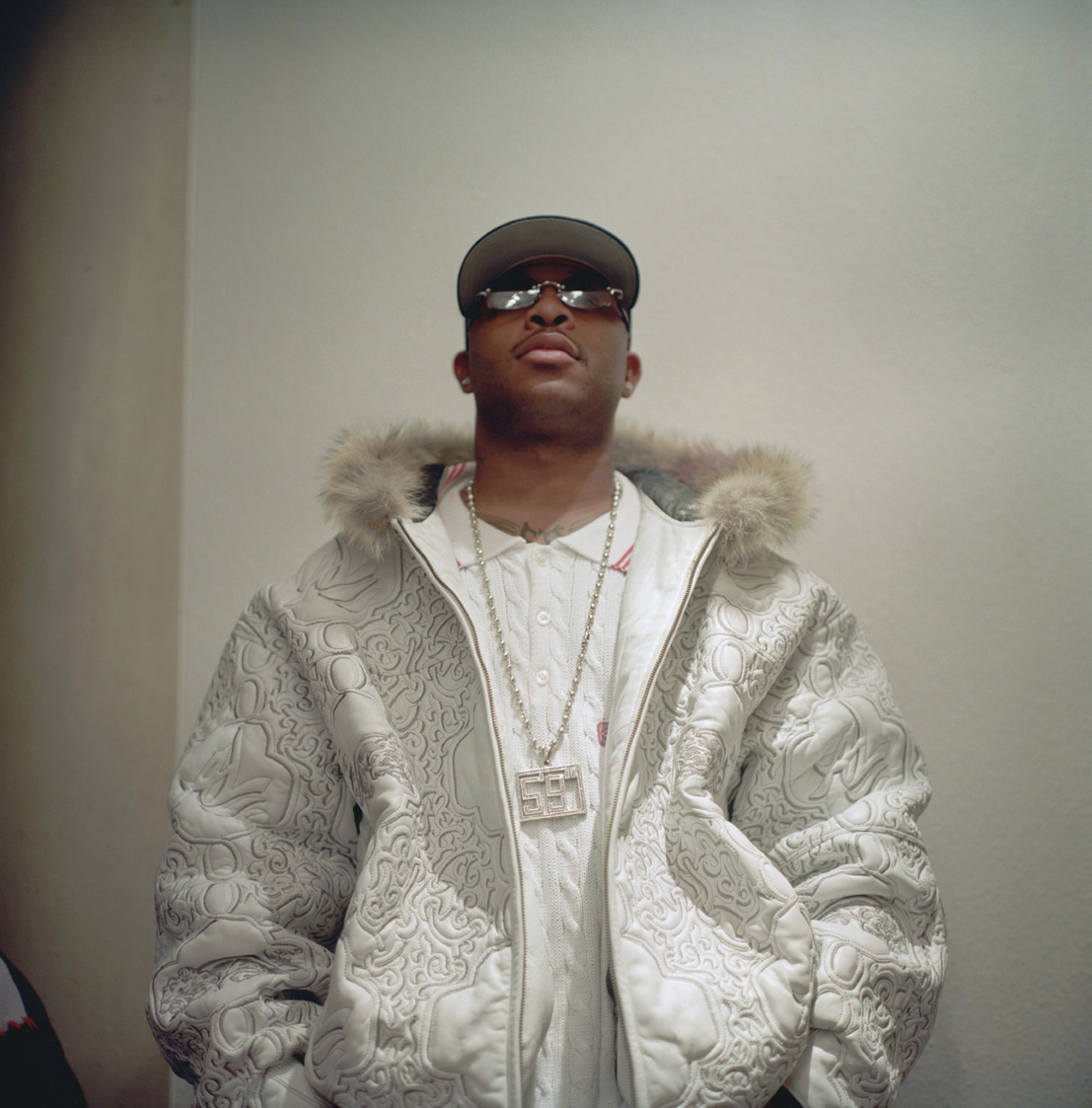
Royce da 5'9" in 2002

=== 2002–2003: Feud with D12 ===
In 2002, Royce had a falling out with D12 including mutual friend and group member Proof, which sparked a public rivalry that resulted in Royce releasing a total of three diss tracks. The first, "Shit on You", was recorded over the instrumental of D12's track of the same name and mainly attacked group member Bizarre. Following Royce's second track, "Malcolm X", D12 responded with "Smack Down", over the instrumental of 50 Cent's "Back Down". Proof himself released the tracks "Many Men", over the instrumental of 50 Cent's "Many Men (Wish Death)"; and "Beef Is Ova", with rap group the Purple Gang. Royce responded with his third track, "Death Day", recorded over 50 Cent's "In Da Club".

Proof confronted Royce outside a Detroit nightclub in 2003, which led to a fight between both rappers' entourages. Proof and Royce were arrested and jailed overnight in adjacent cells, where they talked out their differences and ended the feud. Their rivalry officially ended in 2008 when he was featured on D12's mixtapes Return of the Dozen and The Devil's Night Mixtape.

=== 2004–2005: Death Is Certain and Independent's Day ===
Royce signed with Game Recordings, for whom he had recorded several tracks for the soundtrack of the video game Grand Theft Auto III, released in 2001. The in-game radio station, Game Radio FM, prominently featured Royce's "I'm the King" and the Alchemist-produced solo track, which (along with the publicized beef) helped elevate Royce's name beyond his association with Eminem. In 2001, Royce was featured on pop singer Willa Ford's song "I Wanna Be Bad". In 2004, he released his second and most critically successful album to date, Death Is Certain, charting with another Premier-produced single, "Hip Hop".

After the relative success of his second effort, Royce put out a third solo project, Independent's Day, in 2005. This was met with less acclaim than either of his previous releases. Following their time spent together in adjacent jail cells in 2003, during which they ended their beef, Royce and Proof embarked on two overseas tours together. Though Royce had planned other projects involving Nottz and his former crew, D-Elite, these were cut short after a sentencing to one year in jail for a DUI.

=== 2007–2008: release from jail and The Bar Exam ===
After his release in 2007, Royce with DJ Premier and Statik Selektah released the mixtape The Bar Exam. He also announced an album with Premier; in an interview with Elemental Magazine, Royce stated that, contrary to rumors, Premier would not be producing the entirety of his upcoming album, but will be overseeing the project as executive producer, handpicking all of the beats. Following The Bar Exam, Royce wrote the single for Diddy's album Press Play, "Tell Me". Following this, Diddy also expressed interest in signing him to Bad Boy.

In early 2008, Royce confirmed that he had officially resolved misunderstandings between himself and Eminem. He released The Bar Exam 2 with DJ Green Lantern later in the year, as well as a retail version of the mixtape The Album; the projects featured production from Green Lantern, 9th Wonder, DJ Premier and July 6, among others. Later worked on his Premier-assisted retail release, Street Hop, the lead single of which was "Shake This", also produced by DJ Premier. The project was released October 20, 2009.

=== 2011–2012: Slaughterhouse and Bad Meets Evil reunion ===
Joe Budden collaborated with Crooked I, Joell Ortiz, Royce da 5'9" and Nino Bless on a track titled "Slaughterhouse" on his digital release, Halfway House. Based on the reception of the track, they decided to form a supergroup, minus Nino Bless, and named it after the first song they made together. They released numerous songs throughout early 2009, building a buzz for their album Slaughterhouse, which was released through E1 on August 11, 2009. The album features production from DJ Khalil, Mr. Porter and the Alchemist, plus guest appearances from Pharoahe Monch, K. Young and the New Royales. The group signed with Shady Records on January 12, 2011. On August 28, 2012, Slaughterhouse released their second studio album, Welcome to: Our House. As of November 23, 2012, it has sold 146,000 copies in the United States. In June 2013, the group began recording their second album with Shady Records. Super producer Just Blaze has been tapped to be Executive Producer of the project. The album was set to be released in 2016 but has since been delayed.

After Royce reconciled with Eminem, the duo started working again on new music and released the album Hell: The Sequel on June 14, 2011, with Eminem's label Shady Records. Two singles from the EP were released: "Fast Lane" and "Lighters" featuring Bruno Mars. This is considered Royce's biggest breakthrough into mainstream hip-hop as both singles received regular radio play. The album would be certified Gold by the RIAA. Bad Meets Evil would reunite again for the albums "Shady XV" and "Southpaw", the soundtrack to the film of the same name.

On August 9, 2011, Royce released his fifth album, Success Is Certain. The album title plays on the title of his second release, Death Is Certain.

=== 2014–2016: PRhyme and Layers ===
In 2014, Royce and DJ Premier announced that they would release a collaborative album as the duo PRhyme. In September 2014, Royce da 5'9" and DJ Premier spoke about the album, saying: "I want people to appreciate the fact that we didn't compromise in lieu of the environment. In order to try to change the way that people digest music, we had to take a leap of faith," says Royce. DJ Premier adds, "The bar has to be high. For this album to be another body of work and another chapter for both of our lives." Enlisting the music composing skills of Adrian Younge, DJ Premier went out of his comfort zone and sampled only Younge's music for the album's production. On November 24, 2015, PRhyme released the single "Highs & Lows" ft MF Doom and Phonte of Little Brother to promote their upcoming PRhyme Deluxe Edition release. On December 11, the deluxe edition was released which included the original PRhyme Album with four bonus songs featuring the Roots, Black Thought, Joey Bada$$ and Logic featured on an extended version of the song "Mode".

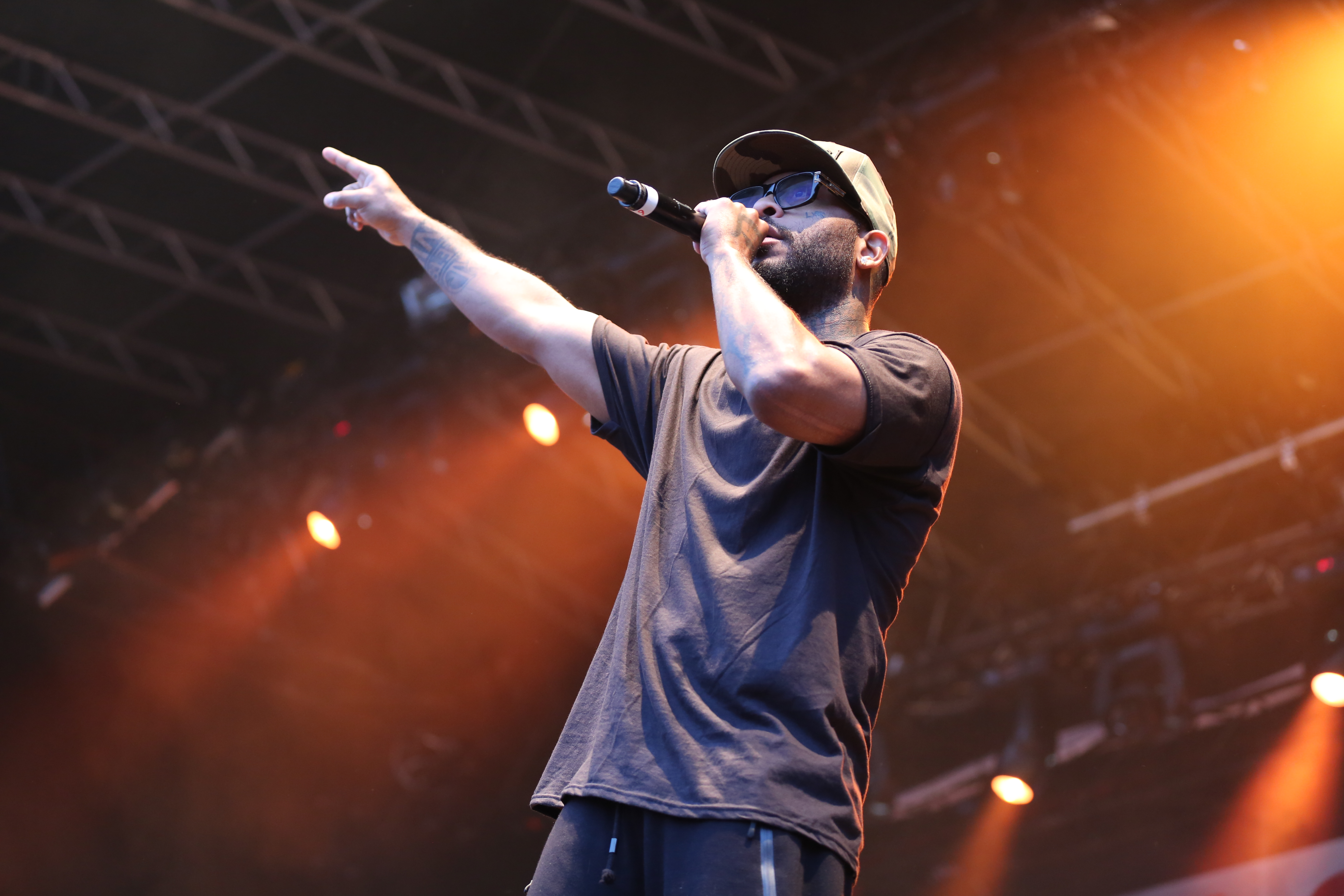
Royce da 5'9" performing in 2016

In May 2017, Royce confirmed on his Instagram account that he and DJ Premier are working on the sequel to their debut album, titled PRhyme 2. He released a set of videos with one in particular featuring DJ Premier scratching on the turntables and making an instrumental. PRhyme 2 was released on March 16, 2018.

Months after the release of the deluxe version of PRhyme, Royce announced his sixth studio album Layers, which was released on April 15, 2016. He released the single "Tabernacle" to positive reception from fans and critics, and then released "Dead President Heads". On March 29, the free pre-album Trust the Shooter EP was released on the mixtape website DatPiff.

In July 2015, Royce collaborated with American rapper Lazarus and was featured on the single Underdog which was released under Russell Simmons' All Def Digital channel. The music video of the single was released in February 2016.

=== 2016–2018: Book of Ryan ===
On March 31, 2016, Royce announced that a new album titled Book of Ryan was near completion. The album was originally planned to be his second album of 2016, but after multiple delays, the album was officially released on May 4, 2018. The album, featuring guest appearances from Eminem, J. Cole, Pusha T, Jadakiss, Fabolous, T-Pain, Logic, was met with widespread acclaim from music critics. That same year, Royce confirmed via social media that his supergroup, Slaughterhouse, had disbanded following the departure of Joe Budden. Later that year, he was also featured on the Eminem single "Not Alike", which was later included in his 2018 album Kamikaze.

=== 2020–2021: The Allegory ===
On February 21, 2020, Royce da 5'9" released his eighth studio album, The Allegory, which included features from T.I, Westside Gunn, Conway the Machine, Ashley Sorrell, and KXNG Crooked (formerly Crooked I). This album contained four singles; the first, "Black Savage", was released on November 15, 2019. This generated a buzz around Royce's production and was featured on Jay-Z's "Inspire Change" campaign. Later, on January 17, 2020, Royce released the second single from the album, "Overcomer" featuring Westside Gunn. On 31 January 2020, Royce released the third single "I Don't Age", which he said was "the first song he made using a self-produced beat". The album peaked at No. 58 on the Billboard 200.

In February 2021, the album was nominated for a Grammy Award for Best Rap Album, losing to Nas' King's Disease.

=== 2022–present: Other releases ===
In 2022, Royce released a greatest hits album titled The Heaven Experience, Vol. 1.

== Personal life ==
In high school, Montgomery was generally a good student, though he said in a 2014 interview that he "did have a bit of attention issues". Royce has two sons, James and Trenton, and three daughters. He is a recovering alcoholic, being sober since September 11, 2012. One of the main reasons for his choice of sobriety was his son saying, "I love my dad. I think he's Superman, but I don't really know him". Montgomery married his high school sweetheart, who also attended Oak Park High School, and they had begun dating in 1995.

Montgomery has a younger brother, Marcus, who goes by the name of Kid Vishis. Vishis released his debut album, Timing Is Everything, on July 22, 2014.

== Discography ==
Studio albums

- Rock City (2002)
- Death Is Certain (2004)
- Independent's Day (2005)
- Street Hop (2009)
- Success Is Certain (2011)
- Layers (2016)
- Book of Ryan (2018)
- The Allegory (2020)

Collaborative albums

- Slaughterhouse (with Slaughterhouse) (2009)
- Hell: The Sequel (with Eminem as Bad Meets Evil) (2011)
- Welcome to: Our House (with Slaughterhouse) (2012)
- Shady XV (with Shady Records) (2014)
- PRhyme (with DJ Premier as PRhyme) (2014)
- PRhyme 2 (with DJ Premier as PRhyme) (2018)

== Awards and nominations ==
| Year | Nominee / work | Award | Result | Ref. |
|---|---|---|---|---|
| 2011 | Recovery | Grammy Award for Album of the Year | Nominated | |
| 2012 | Hell: The Sequel | Detroit Music Award for Outstanding National Major Record Label Recording | Won | |
| 2017 | "Tabernacle" | Detroit Music Award for Outstanding National Single | Nominated | |
| 2017 | "Tabernacle" | Detroit Music Award for Outstanding Video (Major Budget) | Nominated | |
| 2020 | "Black Savage" | Detroit Music Award for Outstanding Video (Major Budget) | Nominated | |
| 2020 | "Cocaine" | Detroit Music Award for Outstanding Video (Major Budget) | Nominated | |
| 2021 | The Allegory | Grammy Award for Best Rap Album | Nominated | |
