= Joell Ortiz discography =

Hip hop recording artist discography

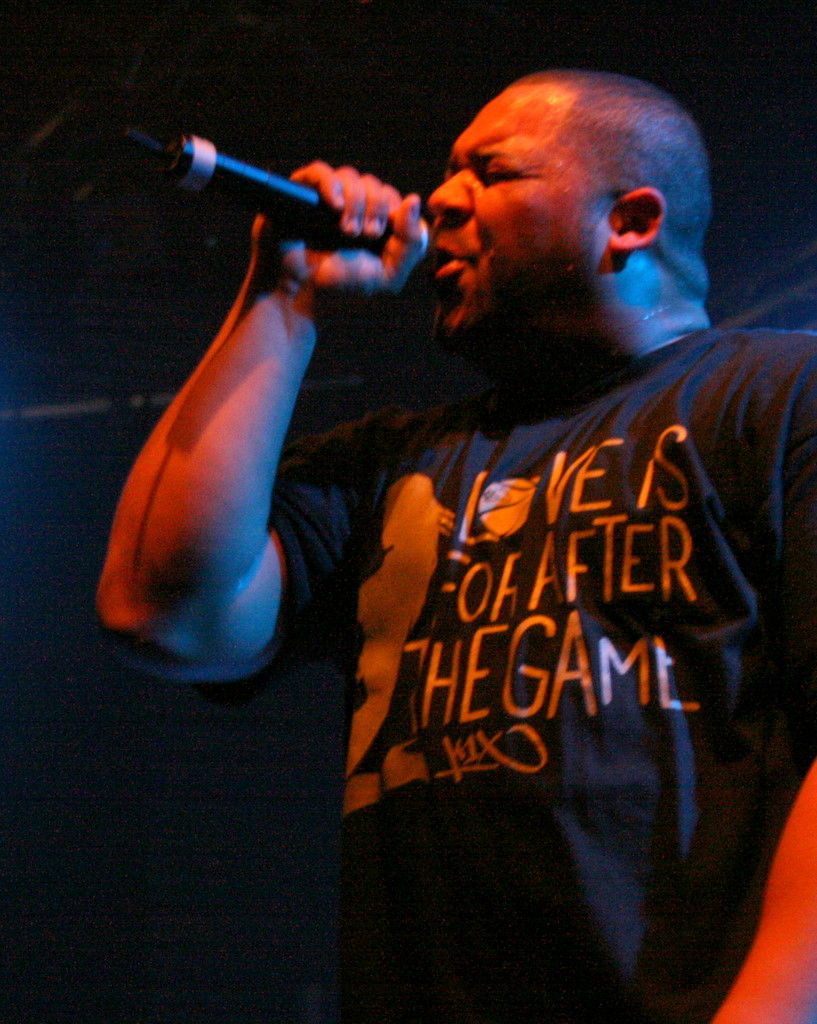
- Ortiz performing in Amager Bio, Denmark in 2007.
- Studio albums: 6
- Singles: 6
- Mixtapes: 9
- Collaboration albums: 8

The discography of Joell Ortiz, an American rapper, consists of six studio albums, six singles and nine mixtapes.

== Albums ==
=== Studio albums ===
List of albums, with selected chart positions and certifications
Title	Album details	Peak chart positions			Certifications
Title	Album details	US	US R&B	US Rap	Certifications
The Brick: Bodega Chronicles	Released: April 24, 2007; Label: E1 Music; Format: CD, digital download	190	49	23	
Free Agent	Released: February 22, 2011; Label: E1 Music; Format: CD, digital download	169	33	15	
House Slippers	Released: September 16, 2014; Label: Penalty Entertainment; Format: CD, digital download	45	8	5	
That's Hip Hop	Released: March 15, 2016; Label: That's Hip Hop; Format: CD, digital download	180	39	38	
Monday	Released: August 30, 2019; Label: Mello Music Group; Format: CD, digital download	—	—	—	
Autograph	Released: November 12, 2021; Label: Mello Music Group; Format: CD, digital download	—	—	—	
Love, Peace & Trauma	Released: September 19, 2025; Label: Hitmaker Music Group; Format: CD, digital download	—	—	—	

=== Collaboration albums ===
Title	Album details	Peak chart positions							Sales
Title	Album details	US	US R&B	US Rap	CAN	NL	SWI	UK	Sales
Slaughterhouse (with Slaughterhouse)	Released: August 11, 2009; Label: E1 Music; Format: CD, digital download	25	4	2	—	—	—	—	
Welcome to: Our House (with Slaughterhouse)	Released: August 28, 2012; Label: Shady, Interscope; Format: CD, digital download	2	1	1	4	90	76	33	US: 176,000
Human (with Illmind)	Released: July 17, 2015; Label: Roseville Music Group, Yaowa! Nation; Format: CD, digital download	—	17	14	—	—	—	—	
Mona Lisa (with Apollo Brown)	Released: October 26, 2018; Label: Mello Music Group; Format: CD, digital download	—	—	—	—	—	—	—	
Gorilla Glue (with Fred the Godson & The Heatmakerz)	Released: January 25, 2019; Label: Vydia; Format: Digital download	—	—	—	—	—	—	—	
H.A.R.D. (with KXNG Crooked)	Released: May 29, 2020; Label: Mello Music Group; Format: CD, LP, digital download	—	—	—	—	—	—	—	
Rise & Fall of Slaughterhouse (with KXNG Crooked)	Released: March 11, 2022; Label: Hitmaker Music Group, Hitmaker Distribution; Format: CD, LP, digital download	152	—	—	—	—	—	—	
Harbor City Season One (with KXNG Crooked)	Released: September 16, 2022; Label: Hitmaker Music Group, Hitmaker Distribution; Format: CD, LP, digital download	—	—	—	—	—	—	—	
Signature (with L'Orange)	Released: August 11, 2023; Label: Mello Music Group; Format: CD, LP, digital download	—	—	—	—	—	—	—	
Prosper (with KXNG Crooked)	Released: October 20, 2023; Label: Hitmaker Music Group; Format: CD, LP, digital download	—	—	—	—	—	—	—	
Tapestry (with KXNG Crooked)	Released: June 28, 2024; Label: Hitmaker Music Group; Format: CD, LP, digital download	—	—	—	—	—	—	—	
W.A.R. (With All Respect) (with The Heatmakerz)	Released: October 11, 2024; Label: Hitmaker Music Group; Format: CD, LP, digital download	—	—	—	—	—	—	—	

=== EPs ===
Title	Album details	Peak chart positions			Sales
Title	Album details	US	US R&B	US Rap	Sales
Slaughterhouse EP (with Slaughterhouse)	Released: February 8, 2011; Label: E1 Music; Format: CD, digital download	147	29	13	
JFKLAX (with KXNG Crooked)	Released: February 24, 2023; Label: Hitmaker Distribution; Format: digital download	—	—	—	

=== Mixtapes ===
List of mixtapes, with year released
Title	Album details
Who The F*@k Is Joell Ortiz?	Released: May 10, 2007; Label: Self-released; Format: Digital download
Joell Ortiz Covers the Classics	Released: May 12, 2009; Label: Self-released; Format: Digital download
Road Kill	Released: December 15, 2009; Label: Self-released; Format: Digital download
Defying The Predictable (with Novel)	Released: February 5, 2010; Label: Self-released; Format: Digital download
Farewell Summer EP	Released: September 10, 2010; Label: Self-released; Format: Digital download
On the House (with Slaughterhouse)	Released: August 19, 2012; Label: Self-released; Format: Digital download
House Rules (with Slaughterhouse)	Released: May 21, 2014; Label: Self-released; Format: Digital download
Yaowa! Nation EP	Released: December 23, 2014; Label: Self-released; Format: Digital download
Westside Highway Story (with Bodega Bamz and Nitty Scott as No Panty) prod. by Salaam Remi	Released: August 5, 2016; Label: Louder Than Life Records; Format: Digital download

== Singles ==
List of singles, showing year released and album name
Title	Year	Album
"Hip Hop"	2007	The Brick: Bodega Chronicles
"Call Me (She Said)" (featuring Novel)	2010	Free Agent
"So Hard" (featuring Ana Yvette)	2010	Free Agent
"House Slippers"	2014	House Slippers
"Music Saved My Life" (featuring B.o.B & Mally Stakz)	2014	House Slippers
"Almost Like Praying"	2017	Almost Like Praying

== Guest appearances ==
List of non-single guest appearances, with other performing artists, showing year released and album name
Title	Year	Other artist(s)	Album
"It's Nothing"	2002	Kool G Rap	The Giancana Story
"it's a Beautiful Thing"	2006	Ras Kass	Eat or Die
"6 in the Morning"	2007	Statik Selektah, Kool G Rap, Sheek	Spell My Name Right: The Album
"Stomp Thru"	2007	Heltah Skeltah	The Album
"Piano Lessons"	2007	Colin Munroe	The Unsung Hero
"Ghetto (Remix)"	2008	Nas	—N/a
"Ey"	2008	DJ Revolution, Termnalogy	King of the Deck
"Where My Homies"	2008	Omar Cruz, Sick Jacken, Mr. Shadow, Guzzle, Conejo, Sinful, Cynic, Spanto & Sleepz	Welcome to Rome
"Talkin to You (Ladies)"	2008	Statik Selektah, Talib Kweli, Skyzoo	Stick 2 the Script
"Best @ It"	2009	Brother Ali, Freeway	Us
"Hood Love"	2009	Royce da 5'9, Bun B	Street Hop
"To the Top"	2009	Critical Madness	Bringing out the Dead
"Where You Come From"	2009	Mr. Capone-E	New Money Records Presents: The Genesis
"God Forgive Me"	2010	DJ Kay Slay, Jae Millz, Saigon	More Than Just A DJ
"1 Nighta"	2010	Masspike Miles, B Hess	Superfly (soundtrack)
"If You Love Me"	2010	Havoc, Cassidy, Sheek Louch	—N/a
"This Is Hip Hop"	2010	Sheek Louch, Termanology	—N/a
"Ask Me About BK"	2010	Maino	The Art of War
"That Work"	2010	DJ Suss One, Uncle Murda, Cassidy, French Montana, Vado	The Feature Presentation Album
"The Trifecta"	2010	King Magnetic, Tug McRaw	Everything's a Gamble
"Prowler 2"	2010	Ski Beatz, Jay Electronica, Jean Grae	24 Hour Karate School
"Follow My Lead"	2010	Joe Budden	Mood Muzik 4: A Turn 4 the Worst
"Work"	2010	Playboy Tre	The Last Call
"Drama"	2010	Ghostface Killah, Game	Apollo Kids
"Bulletproof"	2010	Chris Webby	Best in the Burbs
"Body Down Pt. 2"	2011	Novel	—N/a
"Damn Right"	2011	Statik Selektah	Population Control
"Keep It Rockin"	2011	Maino, Jadakiss, Jim Jones, Swizz Beatz	Keep It Rockin
"See You in Hell"	2011	Omar Linx, Royce da 5'9	City of Ommz
"Young Lords"	2011	Immortal Technique, Pumpkinhead, CF, Panama Alba	The Matryr
"Say It (Remix)"	2011	Termanology, Bun B, Saigon, Freeway	Da Cameo King 2
"All I Know"	2012	2 Pistols, French Montana	—N/a
"Hey Girl"	2012	Big Dave, Kurupt	Self Made
"Tick Tock"	2012	Pusha T, Raekwon, Danny Brown	Music From And Inspired By The Motion Picture The Man With The Iron Fists
"The Grey (Goonberg)"	2013	Realm Reality	In the Grind We Trust
"No Way Out"	2013	DJ Kay Slay, Jon Connor, Cassidy	Grown Man Hip Hop Part 2 (Sleepin' With the Enemy)
"Skeletons"	2013	Joe Budden, Crooked I	No Love Lost
"Roll Deep"	2013	Funkmaster Flex	Who You Mad At? Me or Yourself?
"Bring 'Em Up Dead"	2013	Statik Selektah	Extended Play
"Go!"	2013	AWKWORD, Slug, Maya Azucena	World View
"Hitman for Hire"	2013	DJ Kay Slay, Raekwon, Fred The Godson	The Last Champion
"Save Ya Breath"	2013	Esoteric, Stu Banga	Machete Mode
"I Don't Give a Fuck 2.0"	2013	Peter Jackson, Troy Ave, Talib Kweli, Skyzoo, M.O.P.	Good Company
"90's Rich"	2013	Peter Jackson, DJ Paul, 3D NaTee	Good Company
"Slaughter Session"	2013	Tony Touch, Royce da 5'9, Crooked I	The Piece Maker 3: Return of the 50 MCs
"Mega Trife"	2014	A Villa	Carry on Tradition
"NYC Shine"	2014	DJ Kay Slay, Sheek Louch, Sauce Money	The Last Hip Hop Disciple
"Last Breath"	2014	K-Slick	K-9 Vs. The Industry
"New York"	2014	Tony Yayo, Uncle Murda	El Chapo 3
"Tattoo Gun Scarz"	2014	Soulkast	Memento Mori
"When I'm Dead"	2015	DJ EFN, Chris Rivers, Keith Murray	Another Time
"Make Room"`	2015	Erick Sermon, Sheek Louch	E.S.P.
"Street Rebel"	2015	Neek the Exotic	Still on Hustle
"Hood Nigga"	2015	Sheek Louch, Billy Danze	Silverback Gorilla 2
"Etc. Revisited"	2016	Ras Kass	Soul on Ice Revisited
"Serious"	2016	Joe Budden	Rage & The Machine
"A Couple Dollars"	2016	Skyzoo & Apollo Brown	The Easy Truth
"My Shot (Remix)"	2016	The Roots, Nate Ruess, Busta Rhymes	The Hamilton Mixtape
"Why I Can't Relate"	2016	Father Dude	The Balance
"Regulate"	2017	DJ Kay Slay	Big Brother
"Back to the Bars"	2017	DJ Kay Slay	Hip Hop Frontline
"I Will"	2020	Eminem, Royce da 5'9", Kxng Crooked	Music to Be Murdered By
"Give Me My Flowers Now"	2020	DJ Kay Slay	Living Legends
"Rhyme or Die"	2020	DJ Kay Slay	Homage
"Rolling 110 Deep"	2021	DJ Kay Slay	Accolades
"Bobby Bonilla"	2021	Apollo Brown Stalley	Blacklight
"Black Rock"	2021	Mellow Music Group	Bushido
"Royal"	2022	L'Orange, Blu	Marlowe 3
"No Love'	2023	Black Rob	Life story 2
"International"	2024	Rakim, Kool G Rap	G.O.D.s Network
