= Uncle Murda =

American rapper from New York

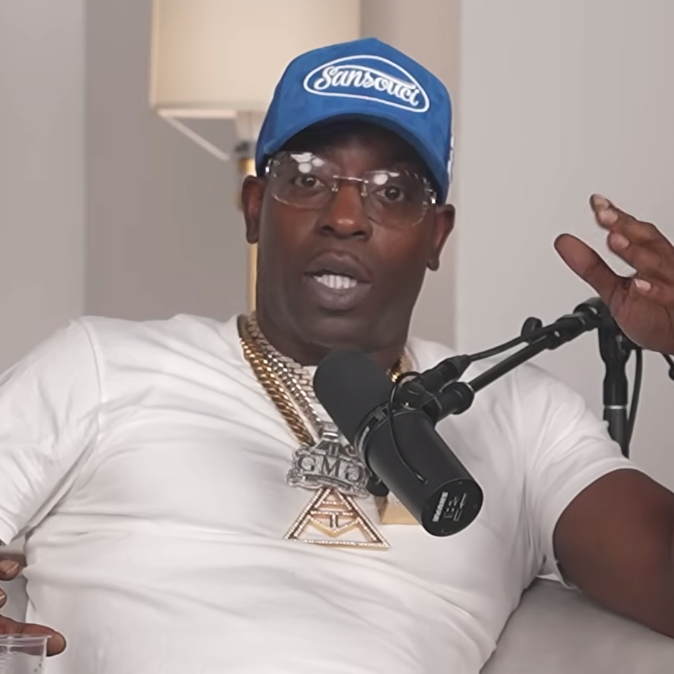
- Uncle Murda in 2026

Background information
- Also known as: U.M., Lenny Grant
- Born: Leonard Carl Grant; July 25, 1980 (age 46)
- Origin: New York City, U.S.
- Genres: East Coast hip hop, gangsta rap
- Occupations: Rapper; songwriter
- Years active: 2001–present
- Labels: Addicted to Money; G-Unit; Def Jam; Roc-A-Fella; EMPIRE
- Website: unclemurda.com

Leonard Carl Grant (born July 25, 1980), better known by his stage name Uncle Murda, is an American rapper from Brooklyn, New York. He signed to 50 Cent's G-Unit Records in 2016, having previously signed to Jay-Z's Roc-A-Fella Records in 2007.

== Career ==
In 2007, Uncle Murda's signed to Jay-Z's record label Roc-A-Fella Records but was eventually released from the label. On November 8, 2016, Uncle Murda signed a deal with 50 Cent and G-Unit Records.

=== Yearly Rap Ups ===
Since 2014, Grant has released an annual "Rap Up" track on or around New Year’s Day, in which he delivers a lyrical recap of the year’s most talked‑about events in hip‑hop and pop culture, often with blunt and provocative commentary. The series quickly became both popular and controversial; Uncle Murda uses the yearly track to gossip about rapper feuds, political upheavals, sports highlights, and celebrity scandals, frequently drawing attention for his unvarnished opinions.

The 2023 rap‑up was so event‑packed that Uncle Murda split it into three separate parts. The 2024 edition, produced by Great John and clocking in at 17 minutes, addressed Diddy’s sex‑trafficking case, JAY‑Z’s rape allegations, the Drake–Kendrick Lamar feud, the YSL RICO trial, and Joe Budden’s lewdness arrest, among other topics. After the 2024 installment, Grant stated that it “might be” his last, having done the series for ten years, though he has made similar statements before.

The concept of the yearly rap‑up has also been a point of contention with fellow rapper Mad Skillz, who had been releasing his own "Rap Ups" since 2002 (with a hiatus in 2013). In 2018, Skillz criticized Uncle Murda for copying the idea, leading to a brief feud between the two.

=== Fabricated shooting claim ===
In January 2024, during an interview on The Danza Project podcast, Grant admitted that he had fabricated a claim about being shot in the head early in his career. He stated, "all rappers lie," and explained he had hoped to gain credibility and buzz by emulating the attention rappers 2Pac and 50 Cent received after surviving shootings. Grant recounted that he had been in a car that was shot up, but he was only cut on the head by a piece of glass from the window, causing a small amount of blood. He then exaggerated the incident, falsely claiming he had been shot in the head, hoping to capitalize on the momentum of his song "Brooklyn" (with Jay‑Z and Fabolous).

=== Rolling Stone investigation ===
In 2024, a Rolling Stone investigation alleged that Uncle Murda operated the Instagram promotion account DaBlock365, which was central to a scheme in which high‑profile artists charged independent musicians for promotional opportunities that were often of little or no value.

=== Podcast ===
In 2025, Murda and rapper Tony Yayo launched the podcast The Real Report on the Volume network. The show, which premiered in January 2026, interviews celebrities from the entertainment industry.

== Discography ==
=== Mixtapes ===
- 2005: Murder Capitol
- 2006: Say Uncle: 2 Hard for Hip-Hop
- 2006: Respect the Shooter
- 2007: Murda Muzik
- 2008: Hard to Kill
- 2008: Back on My Bullshit
- 2008: Rudy King
- 2008: Murda Muzik 2: Return of the Bad Guy
- 2009: Summer Time Shootouts
- 2013: The First 48
- 2013: Murda Muzik 3
- 2014: Ain't Nothin' Sweet
- 2016: Yellow Tape (with Maino)
- 2017: Don't Come Outside, Vol. 1
- 2020: Don't Come Outside, Vol. 2
- 2021: Don't Come Outside, Vol.3
- 2022: Love Don't Live Here
- 2024: Lenny Grant Story

=== Singles ===
- 2007: "Bullet Bullet"
- 2007: "Run The City"
- 2007: "Children's Story"
- 2007: "Hard to Kill"
- 2008: "Still Run The City"
- 2008: "Anybody Can Get It" (original song made and featured in Grand Theft Auto IV)
- 2009: "Murdera" (featuring Akon)
- 2011: "Warning"
- 2011: "Warning (Remix)" (featuring French Montana, Jadakiss, Styles P, Jim Jones, Vado and Cam'ron)
- 2011: "Warning (Remix)" (featuring 50 Cent, Mariah Carey and Young Jeezy)
- 2012: "Money Work" (featuring French Montana)
- 2013: "9's and 45's"
- 2014: "Yearly Rap Up"
- 2015: "Body Dance" (featuring Bobby Shmurda)
- 2015: "Right Now" (featuring Future)
- 2016: "Thot" (featuring Young M.A and Dios Moreno)
- 2017: "On & On" (featuring 50 Cent and Jeremih)
- 2018: "Get the Strap" (featuring Casanova, 6ix9ine and 50 Cent)
- 2018: "Hold Up" (featuring Dave East)
- 2019: "62" (feat Tory Lanez)
- 2019: "It Hit Different"
- 2019: "Who The Boss Is"
- 2019: "God I F With You"
- 2019: "Dope Money"
- 2020: "Party Full Of Demons" (featuring Que Banz)
- 2021: "So What" (featuring Eli Fross)
- 2022: "Justin Laboy Page
- 2024: "Money" (featuring Jadakiss)

=== Guest appearances ===
List of non-single guest appearances, with other performing artists, showing year released and album name
Title	Year	Other artist(s)	Album
"Code of the Streets"	2006	DJ Kay Slay & Greg Street, Lakey The Kid, Maino, Pistol Pete, Prinz	The Champions: North Meets South
"Ya Heard"	2007	French Montana	—N/a
"En Why Cee"	2007	Juganot, Tess, Joell Ortiz	—N/a
"Brooklyn"	2007	Fabolous, Jay-Z	From Nothin' to Somethin'
"G Shit"	2007	Statik Selektah, Jadakiss, Sev-One, Termanology	Spell My Name Right: The Album
"Let it Off"	2007	Memphis Bleek	—N/a
"Shooters For Hire"	2008	Tony Yayo	Black Friday
"Don't Take It There	2008	Papoose, Junior Reid, Tony Yayo, Jim Jones, Sheek Louch	—N/a
"Who Shot Ya 2009"	2009	Maino, Red Cafe	—N/a
"MurderGram 2k9"	2009	Busta Rhymes, Maino, Red Cafe	—N/a
"My Way Or Nothing"	2009	Lloyd Banks	5 & Better Series vol 4
"Stick Up Muzik"	2009	Raekwon, Busta Rhymes	—N/a
"My Hood"	2009	Capone-N-Noreaga, Clipse, Tha Dogg Pound, Maino	Channel 10
"Director's Cut"	2009	Busta Rhymes	I Bullshit You Not
"Watch How You Talk"	2009	Busta Rhymes, Raekwon, The Game	—N/a
"Kay Slayed'em"	2010	DJ Kay Slay, Mistah F.A.B., Grafh	More Than Just a DJ
"Live by the Gun"	2010	Waka Flocka Flame, Ra Diggs	Flockaveli
"That Work"	2010	Vado, DJ Suss One, Cassidy, Joell Ortiz, French Montana	The Feature Presentation Album
"Pablo Doe"	2010	Styles P, N.O.R.E.	The Green Ghost Project
"Pussy"	2010	Jadakiss, Bully	The Champ Is Here, Pt. 3
"Its Whatever"	2010	Jadakiss, Tone	The Champ Is Here, Pt. 3
"Tiger Blood"	2011	Tony Yayo, Lucky Done	Gun Powder Guru 3
"Ghetto Boy"	2012	Young Buck, French Montana	Bond Money
"Poppin' Bottle"	2012	Styles P	The Diamond Life Project
"Excuse Me"	2012	DJ Kay Slay, Gunplay, Vado, Sauce Money	The Return Of The Gatekeeper
"8 Is Enough"	2012	DJ OP, Styles P, Shoota, Papoose, A-Mafia, Capone Push, J.R. Writer	—N/a
"Sicker Than Your Average"	2012	DJ Kay Slay, Sheek Louch, Reek Da Villain	Grown Man Hip-Hop
"Pop Ya Belly Ring"	2013	Wyclef Jean, Hannah Eggert	April Showers
"New York"	2013	Vado, Waka Flocka Flame	—N/a
"Boy"	2013	Vado	Slime Flu 4
"Count Your Blessings"	2013	DJ Kay Slay, Torch, Vado	Grown Man Hip Hop Part 2 (Sleepin' With The Enemy)
"Put It Down"	2014	Pyro Prada	—N/a
"When We Ride"	2014	DJ Kay Slay, Sheek Louch, Styles P	The Rise of a City
"Murda Barz"	2014	DJ OP, Young Buck, Styles P	I Refuse to Lose
"New York"	2014	Tony Yayo, Joell Ortiz	El Chapo 3
"Return Fire"	2014	DJ Kay Slay, Trick Trick, Byrdgang Shotta	I Refuse to Lose
"Ice Man"	2014	DJ Kay Slay, Mysonne and Fat Trel	The Last Hip Hop Disciple
"Back Block"	2014	M.O.P.	—N/a
"Extra Clips"	2014	Memphis Bleek, Yung Kha	—N/a
"This Ain't What You Want"	2015	Miilkbone, Flame Spitta	Voice of Reason
"I Declare War"	2015	Chris Rivers, Whispers	Medicated Consumption
"MMM"	2015	Cassidy, Maino, Papoose, Dave East, FAT TREL, Vado	—N/a
"Straight Outta Brooklyn"	2015	DJ Kayslay, Lil Fame, Maino, Papoose, Troy Ave, Moe Chips, Lucky Don	Shadow of the Sun
"Money and the Power"	2015	Vado, DJ Khaled, Ace Hood, Mavado	Slime Flu 3
"Face Down"	2015	Vado, Chinx Drugz, Maino	Slime Flu 3
"Love My Niggas"	2015	Maino, Vado	K.O.B. 3
"Worldwide"	2015	Method Man, Hanz On, Chedda Bang	The Meth Lab
"It's All Love"	2016	DJ Absolut, Sheek Louch, Raekwon, Nathaniel	—N/a
"Kill Dem"	2016	DJ Kayslay, Murda Mook, Tone Trump	The Rap Attack
"BK Alliance"	2016	DJ Kayslay, M.O.P.	50 Shades Of Slay
"NYC Driveby"	2017	Scram Jones, Dave East, Styles P	—N/a
"Gangsta Muzik"	2017	DJ Kayslay, Ms. Hustle, Young Buck	Can't Knoc the Hustle
"Change the Story"	2017	Bone Thugs-n-Harmony	New Waves
"Think Itz a Joke"	2017	Ron Browz	—N/a
"Gangsta Rhythm"	2017	DJ Kayslay, Trick Trick, Z-Ro, Ra Diggs	The Big Brother
"Tap In"	2018	E-40, B-Legit	Connected and Respected
"Paperwork"	2019	Bun B, Statik Selektah	TrillStatik
"Bout That"	2021	Paki Dunn	Tahi
