= More Than Just a DJ =

Studio album by DJ Kay Slay
- Released: February 9, 2010
- Recorded: 2008–2009
- Genre: Hip-hop
- Length: 70:38
- Label: Streetsweepers; E1
- Producer: DJ Scratch, Amadeus, Neo Da Matrix, Street Radio, AraabMUZIK, Sparkz Tha Trakman, DJ Khalil, Don Cannon, Statiq, Denaun Porter, Sean C & LV, The Alchemist, DJ Infamous, Zaytoven, Drew Correa, Laurent "Slick" Cohen, & Swiff D

DJ Kay Slay chronology
The Champions: North Meets South (2006)	More Than Just a DJ (2010)	The Big Brother (2017)

Singles from More Than Just a DJ
- 1. "Blockstars" Released: September 15, 2009; 2. "Thug Luv" Released: January 12, 2010

Professional ratings
Review scores
Source	Rating
Allmusic	3.5/5 stars

More Than Just a DJ is the third studio album by DJ Kay Slay . It was released on February 9, 2010, through Streetsweepers Entertainment and E1 Music.

== Album information ==
The album was originally set to be released on October 13, 2009 then it was pushed back to November 10, 2009. The third time the album was pushed was due to the album's first single "Blockstars" which originally featured Plies, was replaced by Yo Gotti because according to Kayslay, Plies could not be found when it was time to shoot the video.

== Guests and production ==
Kayslay originally called on collaborators ranging from 50 Cent, Lloyd Banks, Tony Yayo, Busta Rhymes, Saigon, Drake, Ray J, Rell, Nicole Wray, Jim Jones, Juelz Santana, Hell Rell, JR Writer, Cam'ron, AZ, Raekwon, Ghostface Killah, Maino, Red Cafe and longtime collaborator Papoose for the project. Some of these collaborators weren't included on the album though, they were replaced with different artists and/or songs with different artists featured on them.

== Track listing ==
No.	Title	Producer(s)	Length
1.	"Intro" (featuring Busta Rhymes)	DJ Scratch	2:12
2.	"Men of Respect" (featuring Tony Yayo, Papoose, Lloyd Banks, Jim Jones & Rell)	Amadeus	4:53
3.	"Bad Girls" (featuring Jacki-O, Remy Ma, Hedonis da' Amazon & Ayanna Irish)	Street Radio	3:46
4.	"Blockstars" (featuring Yo Gotti, Jim Jones, Busta Rhymes & Ray J)	Street Radio	3:46
5.	"Monster Music" (featuring Cam'ron & Vado)	AraabMUZIK	3:44
6.	"Layed Out" (featuring Bun B, Twista, Papoose, Dorrough, Young Chris & Jay Rock)	Tie Stick	4:21
7.	"Gangsta Shit" (featuring OJ da Juiceman, Papoose & Yo Gotti)	Zaytoven	4:11
8.	"Straight Stuntin Magazine Photo Shoot" (Skit) (featuring Bianca Simmone)	Tie Stick	1:46
9.	"Let's Ryde Together" (featuring Trick-Trick, M.O.P., Trae & Tre Williams)	Street Radio	4:38
10.	"Thug Luv" (featuring Maino, Papoose, Red Cafe & Ray J)	Statiq, Denaun Porter	3:58
11.	"Building with the God" (Skit) (featuring Popa Wu)		1:21
12.	"See the Light" (featuring AZ, Raekwon & Ghostface Killah)	Sean C & LV	3:40
13.	"Hustle Game" (featuring Bun B, Webbie, Lil Boosie & Nicole Wray)	The Alchemist	3:22
14.	"God Forgive Me" (featuring Joell Ortiz, Jae Millz & Saigon)	Street Radio	3:17
15.	"Kay Slayed'em" (featuring Uncle Murda, Mistah F.A.B. & Grafh)	Drew Correa	3:38
16.	"Make the Block Hot" (featuring Nina B, Mike Beck, KI Grip, Lucky Don, GI & Nutso)	Drew Correa, Laurent "Slick" Cohen	4:37
17.	"You Heard of Us" (featuring Sheek Louch, Styles P & Ray J)	Swiff D	3:23
18.	"Street Credibility" (featuring San Quinn, Big Rich & Hood Stars)	Money Alwayz	3:55
19.	"Blockstars (Remix)" (featuring Busta Rhymes, Sheek Louch, Rick Ross, Papoose, Cam'ron, Vado & Ray J)	Street Radio	4:44
20.	"Building with the God Pt. 2" (Outro) (featuring Popa Wu)		1:34
Total length:			70:38

Samples

- Gangsta Shit : The Detroit Spinners - Since I Been Gone

== Charts ==
Chart (2010)	Peak position
U.S. Billboard 200	133
U.S. Billboard Top R&B/Hip-Hop Albums	29
U.S. Billboard Top Rap Albums	10
U.S. Billboard Top Independent Albums	13
