= The Streetsweeper, Vol. 1 =

Studio album by DJ Kay Slay
- Released: May 20, 2003
- Recorded: 2002–2003
- Studio: 54 Sound (Detroit, MI); Aquemini Studios (Atlanta, GA); Chung King (New York, NY); D Block Studios (Yonkers, NY); PatchWerk Studios (Atlanta, GA); Platinum Studios (New York, NY); Room Lab (Queens, NY); Sony Studios (New York, NY); Sound on Sound Studios (New York, NY); Soundtrack Studios (New York, NY); Teamwork Studios (Long Island, NY); The Archives (Oakland, CA); The Cutting Room (New York, NY)
- Genre: Hip-hop
- Length: 1:18:18
- Label: Columbia
- Producer: Buckwild; Dame Grease; Deric "D-Dot" Angelettie; DJ Scratch; Dream Team; E-A-Ski; Eminem; Ez Elpee; Havoc; Jazze Pha; Jerry Duplessis; Kyze; Nottz; Paperchase Inc; P. King; Stevie J; Supa Mario; The Heatmakerz; Vinny Idol; Wyclef Jean

DJ Kay Slay chronology
| The Streetsweeper, Vol. 1 (2003) | The Streetsweeper, Vol. 2: The Pain from the Game (2004) |

Professional ratings
Review scores
| Source | Rating |
|---|---|
| AllMusic | 2.5/5 stars |
| Entertainment Weekly | B |
| HipHopDX | 3.5/5 |
| RapReviews | 7/10 |

The Streetsweeper, Vol. 1 is the debut studio album by American DJ Kay Slay. It was released on May 20, 2003, through Columbia Records.

The production was handled by Paperchase Inc., Dame Grease, Buckwild, Deric "D-Dot" Angelettie, DJ Scratch, Dream Team, E-A-Ski, Eminem, EZ Elpee, Havoc, Jazze Pha, Jerry Duplessis, Kyze, Nottz, P. King, Stevie J, Supa Mario, The Heatmakerz, Vinny Idol and Wyclef Jean.

It features guest appearances from Fat Joe, Remy Ma, The Lox, 8Ball & MJG, 50 Cent, Aaron Hall, A Bless, Amerie, Amil, Angie Martinez, Big Noyd, Birdman, Black Rob, Bristal, Brucie B, Bun B, Cam'ron, Cassidy, Craig Mack, DJ Clue?, DJ Doo Wop, DJ S&S, Dutchess, E-A-Ski, Eminem, Flipmode Squad, Foxy Brown, Funkmaster Flex, G. Dep, Grafh, Hak Ditty, Hollywood, Jagged Edge, J-Hood, Joe Budden, Kam, Kid Capri, Killer Mike, Lady May, MC Ren, Mobb Deep, Nas, Noreaga, Postaboy, Raekwon, Ron G, Sauce Money, Scarface, Shells, Sonja Blade, Tony Touch, Vita, WC and Wyclef Jean.

In the United States, the album debuted at number 22 on the Billboard 200 and number 4 on the Top R&B/Hip-Hop Albums charts. It also made it to number 62 on the Swiss Hitparade and number 25 on the UK Official Hip Hop and R&B Albums Chart. Its single "Too Much for Me" peaked at number 53 on the US Hot R&B/Hip-Hop Songs chart.

== Track listing ==
| No. | Title | Writer(s) | Producer(s) | Length |
|---|---|---|---|---|
| 1. | "Intro" (featuring Aaron Hall) | Keith Grayson; Aaron Hall; Dennis Lambert; Brian Potter | Paperchase Inc. | 3:26 |
| 2. | "I Never Liked Ya Ass" (featuring Scarface, Raekwon and Fat Joe) | Brad Jordan; Corey Woods; Joseph Cartagena; Lamont Porter; Michael Richard Theodore | Paperchase Inc. | 3:37 |
| 3. | "The Streetsweeper" (featuring the L.O.X.) | David Styles; Jason Phillips; Sean Jacobs; Mario Pizzini; Randy Ousley; Donna Summer; Giorgio Moroder; Peter John Bellotte | Supa Mario; Vinny Idol | 3:51 |
| 4. | "50 Shot Ya" (featuring 50 Cent) | Curtis Jackson; George Spivey; James Brown; Gloria Lavern Collins | DJ Scratch | 4:02 |
| 5. | "Get Shot the Fuck Up" (featuring Mobb Deep and Big Noyd) | Kejuan Muchita; Albert Johnson; Tajuan Perry | Havoc | 3:34 |
| 6. | "Everybody Wanna Shine" (featuring Black Rob, G. Dep and Craig Mack) | Robert Ross; Trevell Coleman; Craig Mack; Deric Michael Angelettie; Sylvester Stewart | Deric "D-Dot" Angelettie | 3:16 |
| 7. | "Too Much for Me" (featuring Nas, Baby, Foxy Brown and Amerie) | Nasir Jones; Bryan Williams; Inga Marchand; Amerie Mi Marie Rogers; Donald Woolfolk; Mark Curry; Bernard Edwards; Nile Rodgers | The Dream Team | 4:05 |
| 8. | "Purple Haze" (featuring The Diplomats) | Cameron Giles; Gregory Green; Sean Thomas; Dorothy Moore | The Heatmakerz | 3:28 |
| 9. | "Freestyle" (featuring Eminem) | Marshall Mathers | Eminem | 3:39 |
| 10. | "The Champions" (featuring Doo Wop, Tony Touch, DJ Clue?, Funkmaster Flex, DJ S&S, Brucie B, Kid Capri and Ron G) | Grayson; Raphael Gonzalez; Joseph Hernandez; Shampelle Everett; David Love; Damon Blackmon | Dame Grease | 4:01 |
| 11. | "Seven Deadly Sins" (featuring Vita, Angie Martinez, Duchess, Lady May, Amil, Sonja Blade and Remy Martin) | LaVita Raynor; Angela Martinez; Yamina Washington; Rhonda Robinson; Amil Whitehead; Sonja Holder; Reminisce Smith; Porter; José Alberto Bourbon Ruiz | EZ Elpee; Stevie J. | 5:38 |
| 12. | "New Jack City" (featuring Posta Boy, Shells, Cassidy, Grafh and J-Hood) | Sharard Dixon; William Cintron; Barry Reese; Phillip Bernard; Joshua Hood; Porter | Paperchase Inc. | 4:08 |
| 13. | "Westside Driveby" (featuring E-A-Ski, MC Ren and Kam) | Shon Adams; Lorenzo Patterson; Craig Miller | E-A-Ski | 3:38 |
| 14. | "I'ma Smack This Muthafucka" (featuring Noreaga) | Victor Santiago | Kyze | 2:50 |
| 15. | "Angels Voice" (featuring Flipmode Squad) | Trevor Smith; Rashia Fisher; Marlon King | Nottz | 3:39 |
| 16. | "I Got U" (featuring Styles P and Bristal) | Styles; Jamel Fisher; Walter Sigler | P. King | 3:43 |
| 17. | "Take a Look at My Life (Remix)" (featuring Fat Joe, Remy Martin and A-Bless) | Cartagena; R. Smith; Anthony Best | Buckwild | 5:01 |
| 18. | "Coast to Coast Gangstas" (featuring Sauce Money, Joe Budden, WC, Bun B, Killer Mike and Hak Ditty) | Todd Gaither; Joseph Budden; William Calhoun; Bernard Freeman; Michael Render; Akhim Miller; Blackmon | Dame Grease | 5:45 |
| 19. | "Nino Brown" (featuring Wyclef Jean and Hollywood) | Wyclef Jean; Jerry Duplessis | Wyclef Jean; Jerry "Wonder" Duplessis | 4:05 |
| 20. | "Put That Thing Down" (featuring 8Ball, MJG and Jagged Edge) | Premro Smith; Marlon Goodwin; Brandon Casey; Brian Casey; Phalon Alexander | Jazze Pha | 4:45 |
| Total length: | | | | 1:18:18 |

== Charts ==
| Chart (2003) | Peak position |
|---|---|
| Swiss Albums (Schweizer Hitparade) | 62 |
| UK Albums (OCC) | 183 |
| UK R&B Albums (OCC) | 25 |
| US Billboard 200 | 22 |
| US Top R&B/Hip-Hop Albums (Billboard) | 4 |
