= The Champions: North Meets South =

The Champions: The North Meets the South

Studio album by DJ Kay Slay and Greg Street
- Released: August 22, 2006
- Recorded: 2005–2006
- Genre: Hip-hop
- Length: 1:10:10
- Label: Koch

DJ Kay Slay chronology
The Streetsweeper, Vol. 2 (2004)	The Champions: The North Meets the South (2006)	More Than Just a DJ (2010)

Greg Street chronology
Six O'Clock Vol. 1 (2000)	The Champions: The North Meets the South (2006)

Professional ratings
Review scores
Source	Rating
AllHipHop	3/5 stars
AllMusic	3.5/5 stars
RapReviews	5.5/10

The Champions: The North Meets The South is a collaborative studio album by American deejays KaySlay from New York and Greg Street from Atlanta. It was released on August 22, 2006, through Koch Records. It features guest appearances from Attlas, B.G., Big Daddy Kane, Buffie The Body, Bun B, Busta Rhymes, Cam'Ron, Cassidy, Chamillionaire, C-Note, Fat Joe, Ghostface Killah, Hell Rell, Jae Millz, Jim Jones, Juelz Santana, Kool G Rap, Lakey The Kid, Lil' Flip, Lil Jon, Lil Scrappy, Lil Wyte, Lloyd Banks, Lord Tariq, Maino, Mike Beck, Mike Jones, Papoose, Paul Wall, Pistol Pete, Prinz, Raekwon, Razah, Remy Martin, Shaquille O'Neal, Sheek Louch, Smitty, Speedknot Mobstaz, Three 6 Mafia, Twista, Uncle Murda, Vein and Yung Joc. The album debuted at number 57 on the Billboard 200, number 17 on the Top R&B/Hip-Hop Albums and number 2 on the Independent Albums charts in the United States.

== Track listing ==
No.	Title	Length
1.	"Intro"	0:50
2.	"Go Off" (featuring Busta Rhymes)	2:43
3.	"The Hardest Out" (featuring Papoose, Remy Martin and Hell Rell)	3:27
4.	"Pop the Trunk" (featuring Yung Joc, Papoose and Chamillionaire)	4:00
5.	"Drama Gang" (featuring Cam'ron, Juelz Santana and Jim Jones)	4:18
6.	"Live From the Block" (featuring Mike Jones, Papoose and Paul Wall)	3:54
7.	"Hood Drug Warz" (featuring Three 6 Mafia and B.G.)	4:14
8.	"Interlude" (featuring Shaq Diesel)	0:16
9.	"Can't Stop the Reign 2006" (featuring Bun B, Papoose and Shaq Diesel)	4:25
10.	"One and Only (My Boo)" (featuring Remy Martin and Razah)	3:48
11.	"The Rush" (featuring Lloyd Banks)	1:56
12.	"In the Ghetto" (featuring Fat Joe, Jim Jones, Shaq Diesel, Cassidy and Sheek Louch)	5:11
13.	"Streetniggaz" (featuring Jae Millz, Smitty and Mike Beck)	2:59
14.	"5 Deadly Venoms" (featuring Ghostface Killah, Kool G Rap, Raekwon, Lord Tariq and Big Daddy Kane)	4:58
15.	"Interlude" (featuring Buffie the Body)	0:35
16.	"The Introduction" (featuring Vein)	2:32
17.	"Big Problems" (featuring Lil' Jon, Lil' Flip, Lil' Scrappy and Lil' Wyte)	3:34
18.	"Knock em Out" (featuring Twista and Speedknot Mobstaz)	3:26
19.	"Code of the Streets" (featuring Maino, Uncle Murda, Prinz, Lakey the Kid and Pistol Pete)	4:53
20.	"7 Days a Weeks" (featuring Attlas and C-Note)	4:16
21.	"Can't Stop the Reign (Remix)" (featuring Busta Rhymes, Shaq Diesel, Papoose and Remy Martin)	3:55
Total length:		1:10:10

== Charts ==
Chart (2006)	Peak position
US Billboard 200	57
US Top R&B/Hip-Hop Albums (Billboard)	17
US Independent Albums (Billboard)	2
