= Free Agent (album) =

Studio album by Joell Ortiz
- Released: February 22, 2011
- Recorded: 2008–2010
- Genre: Hip hop
- Length: 46:36
- Label: E1
- Producer: Frank Dukes; Sean C & LV; Knobody; DJ Premier; Kenny Dope; The Audible Doctor; Just Blaze; Nottz; Novel; Frequency; Anna Yvette; Large Professor; Broadway; DJ Khalil; Yuri Zwadiuk

Joell Ortiz chronology
The Brick: Bodega Chronicles (2007)	Free Agent (2011)	House Slippers (2014)

Singles from Free Agent
- 1. "Call Me (She Said)" Released: February 9, 2010; 2. "So Hard" Released: January 18, 2011

Professional ratings
Review scores
Source	Rating
DJ Booth	3.5/5 stars
HipHopDX	4.5/5 stars
RapReviews	(8/10)
Spin	(7/10)

Free Agent is the second studio album by American rapper Joell Ortiz. It was released on February 22, 2011, through E1 Music in the United States after being pushed back. It is the follow-up to his previous album The Brick: Bodega Chronicles (2007).

The album had leaked on the internet 3 months early via Amazon.com, but was later taken down. Joell Ortiz was trying to be released from E1, formally Koch Records, to sign to Shady Records as part of the super group Slaughterhouse. On November 4, 2010 Joell stated through his Twitter account that he was off of E1 Music, but Free Agent was still released through the label. The album features production from DJ Premier, Large Professor, Knobody, DJ Khalil, Sean C & LV, Mr. 187, Broadway, Dookie Fingazz, Nottz, Frank Dukes and Yuri Zwadiuk. Guests are The Lox, Just Blaze, Dookie Fingazz.

== Commercial reception ==
The album debuted at #173 on the Billboard 200 with 4,000 copies sold in its first week released.

== Track listing ==
No.	Title	Producer(s)	Length
1.	"Intro"	Frank Dukes	1:57
2.	"Put Some Money on It" (featuring The LOX)	Sean C & LV	2:29
3.	"Killed for Less" (Intro)		0:19
4.	"One Shot (Killed for Less)" (featuring Fat Joe)	Knobody	3:53
5.	"Sing Like Bilal"	DJ Premier	2:30
6.	"Finish What You Start" (featuring Royce da 5'9")	Kenny Dope	3:16
7.	"Battle Cry" (featuring Just Blaze)	Just Blaze; The Audible Doctor	5:04
8.	"Nursery Rhyme"	Nottz	3:10
9.	"Phone" (Skit)		0:31
10.	"Call Me (She Said)" (featuring Novel)	Novel; Frequency	4:08
11.	"So Hard" (featuring Anna Yvette)	Frequency; Anna Yvette	3:21
12.	"Oh!" (featuring Iffy)	Large Professor	4:06
13.	"Checkin for You" (Skit)		0:19
14.	"Checkin for You" (performed by Sebastian Rios)	Frank Dukes; Yuri Zwadiuk	3:56
15.	"Good Man Is Gone"	Broadway	4:01
16.	"Cocaine"	DJ Khalil	3:36
17.	"Incredible (iTunes Bonus Track)" (featuring Barrington Levy)	The Audible Doctor	3:48

== Charts ==
Chart (2011)	Peak position
US Billboard 200	173
US Top R&B/Hip-Hop Albums (Billboard)	33
US Top Rap Albums (Billboard)	15
US Independent Albums (Billboard)	22
