= The Streetsweeper, Vol. 2 =

The Streetsweeper, Vol. 2: The Pain from the Game

Studio album by DJ Kay Slay
- Released: March 30, 2004
- Recorded: 2003–2004
- Genre: East Coast hip-hop; gangsta rap; hardcore
- Length: 76:29
- Label: Columbia; Sony Urban
- Producer: DJ Kay Slay (exec.); Clark Kent; DJ Twinz; EA-Ski; Eminem; Kanye West; Luis Resto; Mr. Porter; Stay Gettin'; Swizz Beatz; The Dream Team; The Heatmakerz; Juicy J; DJ Paul

DJ Kay Slay chronology
The Streetsweeper, Vol. 1 (2003)	The Streetsweeper, Vol. 2: The Pain from the Game (2004)	The Champions: North Meets South (2006)

Professional ratings
Review scores
Source	Rating
AllMusic	3/5 stars

The Streetsweeper, Vol. 2: The Pain from the Game is the second studio album by American DJ, DJ Kay Slay, released on March 30, 2004, through Columbia Records and Sony Urban Music.

== Background ==
The album was the follow-up to Kay Slay's The Streetsweeper, Vol. 1 released the previous year.

== Production ==
This album followed the same format as the last, several of hip-hop's biggest artists, including 50 Cent and Eminem, perform songs produced by prominent hip hop producers ranging from Swizz Beatz to Kanye West. Kay Slay himself does not rap on nor produce any of the songs, rather he serves as the executive producer and ad-libs on some of the songs.

== Track listing ==
No.	Title	Producer(s)	Length
1.	"King of the Streets" (featuring Caliba, Fat Cat and Arsonist)		2:30
2.	"Face Off" (featuring Ghostface Killah and Scarface)	The Heatmakerz	3:01
3.	"Angels Around Me" (featuring G-Unit and 50 Cent)	DJ Twinz	3:39
4.	"Hands on the Pump" (featuring Memphis Bleek, Sauce Money and Game)	Clark Kent	3:19
5.	"I'm Gone" (featuring Eminem and Obie Trice)	Eminem; Luis Resto^{[a]}	3:09
6.	"Harlem" (featuring Cam'ron and Chinky Brown Eyes)	Stay Gettin'	4:22
7.	"Not Your Average Joe" (featuring Fat Joe, Joe Budden and Joe)	The Dream Team	3:52
8.	"Don't Stop the Music" (featuring Lil' Flip, Lil' Mo and E-40)	EA-Ski	3:33
9.	"The Truth" (featuring LL Cool J)	Swizz Beatz	3:40
10.	"No Problems" (featuring Jaheim, N.O.R.E., Nature and Left Gunz)	Kanye West	4:48
11.	"Alphabetical Slaughter" (featuring Papoose)	Stay Gettin'	4:48
12.	"Drama" (featuring Lil Jon, David Banner, Bun B and Baby D)	Stay Gettin'	4:15
13.	"Who Gives A Fuck Where You From" (featuring Three 6 Mafia, Lil Wyte and Frayser Boy)	Juicy J; DJ Paul	4:46
14.	"Get Retarded" (featuring The Diplomats and Twista)	Stay Gettin'	4:27
15.	"Census Bureau" (featuring D12)	Mr. Porter	4:59
16.	"Through Your Head" (featuring Jae Millz, Angelous, Cashmere, Trife, Maino, Tru Life and The Bad Seed)	Stay Gettin'	5:37
17.	"Untouchables" (featuring Prodigy, Raekwon and AZ)	The Heatmakerz	3:35
18.	"The Kennedies" (featuring Bristal and C. White)	The Heatmakerz	3:55
19.	"Celebrity Love" (featuring Lala, Tiffany, Steph Lova, Sunny and Chinky Brown Eyes)	DJ Kay Slay; The Heatmakerz	4:14
Total length:			76:29

Notes

- ^{^[a]} signifies an additional producer.
- "Hands on the Pump" contains interpolations from "The Breakdown" by Rufus Thomas.
- "Not Your Average Joe" contains interpolations from "Ain't Nobody" by Rufus & Chaka Khan.

Samples

- "Don't Stop the Music" samples "Don't Stop The Music" by Yarbrough & Peoples.
- "Who Gives A Fuck Where You From" contains a sample from "Transformers (Original Version)" by Anne Bryant.
- "Through Your Head" contains samples from "Didn't I (Blow Your Mind This Time)" by Regina Belle.
- "Celebrity Love" contains interpolations from the composition "Let's Do It Again" written by Curtis Mayfield.

== Chart history ==
Chart (2004)	Peak position
US Billboard 200	27
US Billboard R&B/Hip-Hop Albums	10
