= The Brick: Bodega Chronicles =

Studio album by Joell Ortiz
- Released: April 24, 2007
- Recorded: 2005–2006
- Genre: Hip hop
- Length: 59:10
- Label: Koch
- Producer: Mike "Heron" Herard (exec.); Alchemist; Ax The Bull; DJ EMZ; Frank Dukes; Hecks; Jonyfraze; JPaz; MoSS; P-Money; Prince and Machavelli; Showbiz; Street Radio; V.I.C.

Joell Ortiz chronology
The Brick: Bodega Chronicles (2007)	Free Agent (2011)

Singles from The Brick: Bodega Chronicles
- 1. "Hip Hop" Released: January 23, 2007

Professional ratings
Review scores
Source	Rating
HipHopDX	4/5
PopMatters	7/10 stars
Prefix	5/10
RapReviews	7.5/10
Spin	3/5 stars
XXL	3/5 (L)

The Brick: Bodega Chronicles is the debut album by American Brooklyn-based rapper Joell Ortiz. It was released on April 24, 2007 through Koch Records. Production was handled by several record producers, including Frank Dukes, Alchemist, MoSS, P-Money and Showbiz. It features guest appearances from Akon, Big Daddy Kane, Big Noyd, Cashmere, Gab Gacha, Grafh, Immortal Technique, La Bruja, Lord Black, Maino, Ras Kass, Sha Stimuli, Solomon and Styles P.

== Track listing ==
No.	Title	Producer(s)	Length
1.	"125 Part 1 (The Bio)"	MoSS	5:28
2.	"Brooklyn (Remix)" (featuring Cashmere, Maino, Big Daddy Kane and Solomon)	JPaz	2:45
3.	"Caught Up"	DJ EMZ	3:37
4.	"Night in My P's" (featuring Big Noyd)	Ax The Bull	2:26
5.	"125 Part 2 (Fresh Air)"	Frank Dukes	5:10
6.	"Hip Hop"	Hecks	3:25
7.	"Modern Day Slavery" (featuring Immortal Technique)	Jonyfraze	2:48
8.	"125 Part 3 (Connections)" (featuring Ras Kass, Sha Stimuli, Grafh and Gab Gatcha)	Frank Dukes	6:05
9.	"BQE" (featuring Lord Black and Alex "BQE" Santiago)	Alchemist	4:11
10.	"Block Royal"	Prince; Machavelli	2:49
11.	"Latino" (featuring La Bruja)	V.I.C.	3:36
12.	"Keep on Callin'" (featuring Akon)	P-Money	3:44
13.	"Time Is Money" (featuring Styles P)	Street Radio	3:02
14.	"Brooklyn Bullshit"	Showbiz	4:20
15.	"125 Part 4 (Finale)"	Frank Dukes	5:43
Total length:			59:10

Best Buy bonus tracks
No.	Title	Producer(s)	Length
16.	"125 Part 5"	MoSS	5:18
17.	"L.I.F.E."	Mel-Man; DJ Silk	2:18
18.	"Feel Good"	Dr. Dre	4:20

== Charts ==
Chart (2007)	Peak position
US Top R&B/Hip-Hop Albums (Billboard)	49
US Top Rap Albums (Billboard)	23
US Independent Albums (Billboard)	40
US Heatseekers Albums (Billboard)	16
