= Human (Joell Ortiz and Illmind album) =

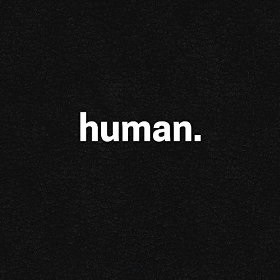

Studio album by Joell Ortiz and Illmind
- Released: July 17, 2015
- Recorded: 2015
- Genre: Hip hop
- Length: 38:30
- Label: Roseville Music Group; Yaowa! Nation
- Producer: Cubeatz; Illmind; G Koop

Joell Ortiz chronology
House Slippers (2014)	Human (2015)	That's Hip Hop (2016)

Illmind chronology
Behind The Curtain (2011)	Human (2015)

Human is the fourth studio album by American rapper Joell Ortiz. The album is entirely produced by Illmind. The album was released on July 17, 2015, by Roseville Music Group and Yaowa! Nation.

== Track listing ==
Credits adapted from the album's official liner notes.

No.	Title	Writer(s)	Producer(s)	Length
1.	"Human (Intro)"	Joell Ortiz; Ramon Ibanga, Jr.; Kevin Gomringer	Illmind; Cubeatz	1:09
2.	"New Era"	Ortiz; Ibanga, Jr.	Illmind	3:01
3.	"I Just Might"	Ortiz; Ibanga, Jr.; Gomringer	Illmind; Cubeatz	3:36
4.	"My Niggas"	Ortiz; Ibanga, Jr.; Gomringer	Illmind; Cubeatz	2:40
5.	"Six Fo'"	Ortiz; Ibanga, Jr.	Illmind	2:51
6.	"Light a L"	Ortiz; Ibanga, Jr.	Illmind	3:22
7.	"Lil' Piggies"	Ortiz; Ibanga, Jr.	Illmind	3:12
8.	"Latino, Pt. 2" (featuring Emilio Rojas, Bodega Bamz & Chris Rivers)	Ortiz; Ibanga, Jr.; Emilio Rojas; Christopher Rios, Jr.; Nathaniel De La Rosa	Illmind	6:20
9.	"Who Woulda' Knew" (featuring Father Dude)	Ortiz; Ibanga, Jr.; Mitch Conwell; Robert Mandell	Illmind; G Koop	5:02
10.	"Bad Santa" (featuring Jared Evan)	Ortiz; Ibanga, Jr.; Gomringer; Jared Evan	Illmind; Cubeatz	3:23
11.	"Human (Outro)"	Ortiz; Ibanga, Jr.; Ben Freelander	Illmind	3:54
Total length:				38:30

== Charts ==
Chart (2015)	Peak position
US Independent Albums (Billboard)	21
US Top R&B/Hip-Hop Albums (Billboard)	17
