= House Slippers =

Studio album by Joell Ortiz
- Released: September 16, 2014
- Recorded: 2012–2014
- Genre: Hip hop
- Length: 44:57
- Label: Penalty
- Producer: Frequency; Gnyus; The Heatmakerz; Illmind; Operator Emz; Prafit

Joell Ortiz chronology
Free Agent (2011)	House Slippers (2014)	Human (2015)

Singles from House Slippers
- 1. "House Slippers" Released: June 17, 2014; 2. "Music Saved My Life" Released: July 22, 2014

House Slippers is the third studio album by American rapper Joell Ortiz. The album was released on September 16, 2014, by Penalty Entertainment. The album features guest appearances from Lee Carr, B.o.B, Mally Stakz, Royce da 5'9", Joe Budden, Crooked I, Sahlance, Maino and Kaydence. The album was supported by the singles "House Slippers" and "Music Saved My Life".

== Background ==
In a March 2012, interview with Montreality, he spoke about the album originally titled Yaowa, saying: "Working alongside these dudes: Crooked I, Joe Budden, Royce, it opened up my eyes to a whole bunch of other things I want to talk about as a solo artist. The Yaowa thing has been long awaited, but for me it’s like baby steps all over again so I’mma make this one special. But May 15th the Slaughterhouse album will be out, Welcome to: Our House. The Yaowa album, dates is just numbers. I’m just working."

In an October 2013, interview with, The Come Up Show, he spoke about when the album would be released, saying: "Well you know what, this YAOWA album would’ve came out maybe a year [or a] year and a half ago, but I’m happy it didn’t. I made some changes in my life that I talk about on the YAOWA project. From weight loss to stopping smoking and drinking, just lifestyle changes. I’ve traveled so much with Slaughterhouse; I’ve learned so many things from Eminem and I’ve just been alongside some great people so my story got iller. I feel like if I told my story a year and a half ago it still would have been ill because I’m one of the dopest, but I just think that it’s so much more wide-spread now that this YAOWA album is going to be received in a way where people are going to learn a lot about the old me and the new me. I couldn’t have it any other way; I mean it’s been a while but worth the wait regardless, if that sounds cliche or not I really mean that.

On April 7, 2014, Joell Ortiz announced that he had signed a deal with Penalty Entertainment to release his third studio album House Slippers in 2014. In a July 2014, interview with Crazy Hood, he spoke about why he changed the album title to House Slippers, saying: "The way I came up with House Slippers was, when I listen to the album, I’m not afraid, man. I’m very comfortable with myself. I don’t care what anybody’s gonna think. This is the first time I can honestly say that. I don’t care if they go, “Word? That happened?” or “He’s okay with sayin’ that?” I don’t care! In so many ways, this album is only for me. But I swear it’s gonna be for everybody who feels like me. Once I found my comfortable place as a human being, I wanted to find a name that equated that comfort. When are you most comfortable, Joell? Sitting on my couch, in my house slippers, with the remote in my hand, just doing what I want to do."

== Singles ==
On June 17, 2014, the album's first single "House Slippers" was released. On June 17, 2014, the music video was released for "House Slippers". On July 22, 2014, the album's second single "Music Saved My Life" featuring B.o.B and Mally Stakz was released. On September 10, 2014, the music video was released for "Music Saved My Life" featuring B.o.B and Mally Stakz. On October 29, 2014, the music video was released for "Q&A". On December 9, 2014, the music video was released for "Crack Spot".

== Critical response ==
Professional ratings
Review scores
Source	Rating
AllMusic	4/5 stars
HipHopDX	3.5/5 stars
XXL	4/5 (XL)

House Slippers received positive reviews from music critics. Steven Goldstein of HipHopDX said, "House Slippers is a strong listen, and Joell Ortiz’s redemption story is easy enough to follow without falling victim to platitude. The radio efforts and the excessive Biggie Smalls interpolations create two hindering extremes, but the majority of the tracks that fall somewhere in the between are worth at least a few rotations." David Jeffries of AllMusic said, "Long, purposeful cuts and fine flow for the overall album make this one one of the rapper's best solo efforts." Rachel Chesbrough of XXL stated, "The musicality is strong as the instrumentals drip with crossover appeal, and Joell is right in his comfort zone describing a childhood shaped by industry legends. What it comes down to with House Slippers, is that there simply isn’t a throwaway moment, let alone a throwaway track. The beats offer variety, and the bars are packed with verbal skills that demand multiple rewinds. The Yaowa, in short, does not disappoint."

== Commercial performance ==
The album debuted at number 45 on the Billboard 200 chart, with first-week sales of 5,876 copies in the United States.

== Track listing ==
No.	Title	Producer(s)	Length
1.	"House Slippers"	Illmind	3:17
2.	"Cold World" (featuring Lee Carr)	The Heatmakerz	2:57
3.	"Dream On"	Illmind	3:50
4.	"Music Saved My Life" (featuring B.o.B & Mally Stakz)	The Heatmakerz	3:31
5.	"Brothers Keeper" (featuring Royce da 5'9", Joe Budden & Crooked I)	The Heatmakerz	5:25
6.	"Q & A"	Frequency; Operator Emz	4:23
7.	"Get Down"	The Heatmakerz	3:06
8.	"Say Yes" (featuring Sahlance)	The Heatmakerz	3:27
9.	"Better Than" (featuring Maino & Kaydence)	Prafit; Illmind	3:55
10.	"Phone" (featuring GiGi Daai)	The Heatmakerz	3:49
11.	"Candy" (featuring Mally Stakz)	The Heatmakerz	3:32
12.	"Crack Spot"	Gnyus	3:45

== Charts ==
Chart (2014)	Peak position
US Independent Albums (Billboard)	47
US Top R&B/Hip-Hop Albums (Billboard)	26
