= Rise & Fall of Slaughterhouse =

Studio album by Kxng Crooked and Joell Ortiz
- Released: March 11, 2022
- Recorded: 2021–22
- Genre: Hip-hop
- Length: 47:46
- Label: Hitmaker
- Producer: DJ Pain 1; DJ Silk; Fong-Sai-U; The Heatmakerz; Hesami; Jim Gittum

Kxng Crooked chronology
H.A.R.D. (2020)	Rise & Fall of Slaughterhouse (2022)

Joell Ortiz chronology
Autograph (2021)	Rise & Fall of Slaughterhouse (2022)

Singles from Rise & Fall of Slaughterhouse
- 1. "Vacancy" Released: February 25, 2022; 2. "Backstage" Released: March 3, 2022; 3. "Smoke" Released: March 10, 2022

Rise & Fall of Slaughterhouse is a collaborative studio album by American rappers Kxng Crooked (formerly known as Crooked I) and Joell Ortiz. It was released on March 11, 2022, by Hitmaker Music Group. It features guest appearances by Sly Pyper, Blakk Soul, and Traxx Sanders, and production by The Heatmakerz, DJ Pain 1, and Hesami, among others.

Professional ratings
Review scores
Source	Rating
Allmusic	3.5/5 stars

== Background and release ==
The album was announced on February 25, 2022, with its lead single, "Vacancy" featuring Blakk Soul, being released the same day. The album's second single, "Backstage", was released on March 3. The album's third single, "Smoke", was released on March 10. To promote the album, the rappers released a three-episode miniseries named "ForeClosure" on YouTube in the days leading up to the album's release.

Lyrically, the album features the two rappers mournfully reflecting on their group Slaughterhouse's breakup. On the track "Vacancy", Ortiz raps, "Royce said he ain't doing the three-man without Joe / But Joe said he retired, so how the hell is it supposed to go / I looked in the eyes of Crooked I and said one last time, he said let's go / So this one's for the fans and anyone else who wants to know / Why the best group ever / Turned out to be one of the best groups that never".

Both former Slaughterhouse groupmates Royce da 5'9" and Joe Budden expressed their distaste for the project. On February 25, 2022, Royce da 5'9" made a lengthy post on Instagram criticizing the project for attempting to "burn down" a brand that they had only owned half the rights of, referencing the album's cover art, which features the Slaughterhouse logo set ablaze. Budden publicly denounced the project in an Instagram Live session with Royce and Ortiz, which later took a heated turn after an argument broke out between the three rappers.

== Track listing ==
All tracks are written by Dominick Antron Wickliffe and Joell Christopher Ortiz.

Rise & Fall of Slaughterhouse track listing
No.	Title	Producer(s)	Length
1.	"The Birth Intro"	Jim Gittum	1:07
2.	"Vacancy" (featuring Blakk Soul)	The Heatmakerz	4:50
3.	"Ain't Nobody Mad"	DJ Silk	3:12
4.	"Backstage"	Hesami	4:56
5.	"Flood Waters" (featuring Sly Pyper)	DJ Silk	4:24
6.	"Fukglasshouse"	DJ Pain 1	3:34
7.	"Brothers Keeper 2"	Hesami	3:44
8.	"Almighty"	Hesami	3:42
9.	"Smoke"	DJ Silk	3:20
10.	"Coastin'" (featuring Traxx Sanders)	DJ Pain 1	4:00
11.	"Still in My Feelings"	The Heatmakerz	3:37
12.	"Look Mama"	Fong-Sai-U	3:56
13.	"Sorry"	The Heatmakerz	3:24
Total length:			47:46

Deluxe Edition
No.	Title	Producer(s)	Length
14.	"Dream"	The Heatmakerz	4:01
15.	"Cornflakes"	The Heatmakerz	3:57

== Charts ==
Chart performance for Rise & Fall of Slaughterhouse
Chart (2022)	Peak position
US Billboard 200	152
US Independent Albums (Billboard)	22
