= Novel (musician) =

American rapper (born 1981)

- Born: Alonzo Mario Stevenson; Los Angeles, California
- Genres: Hip hop
- Occupations: Rapper, producer, singer, songwriter
- Years active: 2000–present
- Labels: Rowdy, Capitol, Rawkus

Alonzo Mario Stevenson (born September 3, 1981), known by his stage name Novel, is an American hip-hop/soul artist based in Los Angeles, California. He is the son of William Stevenson and the grandson of soul pioneer Solomon Burke.

Novel has collaborated with artists such as Lauryn Hill and Talib Kweli, and worked with other musicians including Royce Da 5'9', Joss Stone, David Guetta, India.Arie, Tweet, Stacie Orrico and Smokey Robinson, among others. He has received over five Grammy nominations and one win.

== Biography ==
Alonzo Mario Stevenson was born in Los Angeles, California, son of singer William Stevenson, Melanie Burke, a background singer for Chaka Khan. Stevenson, also the grandson of soul music pioneer Solomon Burke, grew up with his mother in Atlanta, Philadelphia, and North Carolina, sometimes staying in shelters because they had no money. A friend of Stevenson's in Philadelphia nicknamed him “Novel“ because he always carried a notebook. After running away from home at age 14, Novel returned to California where his father set up a recording studio for him. He released a single, “Peach“, on Rawkus Records in 2003. The video for the song features Smokey Robinson, a longtime family friend and Novel's godfather. Vibe called the song's melody “infectious“ and Novel's vocals “seductive“, but Novel almost didn't release the single because he “felt it was bubble gum“. His debut album The Word was set to be released in 2003 but was ultimately cancelled when Rawkus split from MCA Records, which folded that year.

Novel spent the next several years writing and producing for other artists, including Alicia Keys, Beyoncé Knowles, India.Arie, Joss Stone, Kelis, and Leona Lewis. He signed to Dallas Austin's Rowdy Records in 2007 and released an EP, I Am... (Future Black President), the following year. The single “I Am“, featuring Talib Kweli and Spree Wilson, contains a sample of the 2001 Ben Folds song “The Luckiest“. Folds also provides pianos and vocals on the track. Novel's debut full-length album, The Audiobiography, was announced in early 2009. Spin wrote that Novel's “innate talents ooze“ on the album and that it contains a “series of slinky funk jams“, but it also “sounds a little too well-oiled at times“. Novel wrote and featured on the David Guetta song, “Missing You", from Guetta's 2009 album One Love. The song peaked at number 85 on the French singles chart. Novel and rapper Joell Ortiz released a collaborative album, Defying the Predictable, in 2010.

== Discography ==
=== Albums and EPs ===
- He Can't (2002, EP, with Kool G Rap)
- I Am (Future Black President)
- The EP (2008, Rowdy/Capitol)
- Calligraphy (TBA/2012, Lost Poets Music)
- Under Water
- Overwhelmed (2012)
- Black In America (2016)
- Unreligious (2016)
- Goodbye August (2016)
- Dedication (2017)
- Introverted Dreamer (2018)
- Somewhere off in the quiet corner (2019)
- The Quarantine Files (2020)
- The Joys of Misery (2021)
- Libations (2022)
- Alone for the Holidays (2022)

=== Mixtapes ===
- Chapter One (2008)
- 808's and Mixtapes (2009)
- Suspended Animation (2009)
- Defying the Predictable (with Joell Ortiz) (2010)
- Legato Blues Summer (2010)
- Grant Me Serenity (2011)
- Red Wine & Ambien (2012)
- Red Wine & Ambien II (2014)

=== Production and writing ===
Title	Artist	Label	Year	Contribution
Stand to the Side feat. Novel	Talib Kweli	MCA	2002	writer/& Feature
Peach Remix feat. G Unit, LLoyd Banks	Novel	Rawkus	2002	writer/producer
Purify Me	India.Arie	Motown	2005	writer
Bossy	Kelis	LaFace/Zomba	2005	writer
Sick & Tired	Monica	Motown	2005	writer/ co-producer
Roll with Me	Sammie	Rowdy/Universal	2006	producer/writer
Slow	Sammie	Rowdy/Universal	2006	producer/writer
Addiction	Stacie Orrico	EMI/Virgin	2006	Producer/Writer
Frustrated	Stacie Orrico	EMI/Virgin	2006	Producer/Writer
Baby Girl	Stacie Orrico	EMI/Virgin	2006	Producer/Writer
Brush Em Off feat. Novel	Stacie Orrico	EMI/Virgin	2006	Producer/Writer
Dream You	Stacie Orrico	EMI/Virgin	2006	Producer/Writer
Easy to Love You	Stacie Orrico	EMI/Virgin	2006	Producer/Writer
Wait	Stacie Orrico	EMI/Virgin	2006	Producer/Writer
Tell You Something	Alicia Keys	J Records	2007	Writer
What We're Gonna Do	Joss Stone	Emi/Virgin	2007	Writer/ Co-Producer
Music feat. Lauryn Hill	Joss Stone & Lauryn Hill	Emi/Virgin	2007	Writer/Co-Producer
Whatever It Takes	Leona Lewis	SONYBMG UK	2007	Producer/Writer
Myself feat. Novel	Leona Lewis	SONYBMG UK	2007	Writer
Back Down	Sugababes	Island UK	2007	Producer/Writer
With You	Tweet	Bugsby Group	2007	Producer/Writer
Anymore	Tweet	Bugsby Group	2007	Producer/Writer
Alright, Soundtrack & Score	Knivez Out	Sony Pictures	2008	Producer/Writer
I Can't Be Without You	Nikki Flores	Epic/Sony	2008	Producer/Writer
Love feat. Novel	Nikki Flores	Epic/Sony	2008	Producer/Writer
Call Me feat. Novel	Joell Ortiz	E1 Music	2009	Producer/Writer
We Don't Believe You feat. Novel	Joell Ortiz	E1 Music	2010	Writer
Raindrops feat. Novel	Slaughterhouse	E1 Music	2009	Writer
Missing You Feat. Novel	David Guetta & Novel	Virgin Fra (EMI)	2009	Writer
Therapy	India Arie	UMG	2009	Writer
Broken	Leona Lewis	Sony BMG UK	2009	Writer
Eyes For You	Esmee Denters Justin Timberlake	Tennman	2009	Producer/Writer
Hero	David Guetta	Virgin Fra (EMI)	2010	Writer
Coming Home	Lemar	Epic Sony BMG	2010	Producer/Writer
Trust Him	Fantasia	J Records	2010	Producer/Writer
Ms. Orleans feat. Kid Rock	Trombone Shorty	Jazz	2011	Writer
Walk with Me feat. Novel	Lecrae	Reach	2012	Writer/ Feature
Under Water, Overwhelmed EP	Novel	Unsigned/Lost Poets	2012-2013	Writer/ Co-Producer
The Woman You Love feat. Busta Rhymes	Ashanti	Unknown	2012/2013	Writer
BlackStreet	Teddy Riley	N/A	2013/2014	Writer
Detox Album/Untitled feat. Novel	Dr. Dre	Interscope	Unknown	Writer
If I Die Tonight feat. Novel	Lecrae	Reach	2013	Writer
Fire & Brimstone	Trombone Shorty	Jazz	2014	Writer
Nothing Is Impossible	Smokie Norful	Motown Gospel	2014	Writer/ Co-Producer
He Loves Me	Smokie Norful	Motown Gospel	2014	Writer/ Co-Producer
Hey Mama (feat. Nicki Minaj)	David Guetta	unknown	2015	Vocalist/Sample Re-imagine for Film and Commercial versions only
Made In America	The Game	The Documentary 2	2015	co-Writer
Joy (NBA Theme Song)	Coby Odonis	Sony	2015	co-Writer/ Co-Producer
Lifes Pretty Sweet (Georgia Tourism Theme)	Novel	unknown	2016	co-Writer/ Producer
Can't Keep Me Caged (Netflix Commercial)	Novel	Lost Poet Indie	2016	Writer/ Producer
Key To The Streets feat. Migos (Remix)	YFN LUCCI	T.I.G.	2016	co-Writer/Producer
No Dope On Sundays (feat. Pusha T)	Cyhi Da Prynce	Sony	2017	co-Writer/ Co-Producer
Get Yo Money	Cyhi Da Prynce	Sony	2017	co-Writer/ Co-Producer
Don't Know Why (feat. Jagged Edge)	Cyhi Da Prynce	Sony	2017	co-Writer/ Co-Producer
Leave With You (feat. Novel)	Dallas Austin	Rowdy	2017-2018	co-Writer/Vocal Producer
Not A Rich Man (feat. Royce da 5′9″)	Summer Of 96	Unknown	2017	Writer/Producer
Sunflower Seeds (feat. Novel)	PRhyme	N/A	2018	co-Writer/Performer
Misunderstood (feat. Novel)	Father Figures Movie	Soundtrack/ Film Score	2018	Producer/Writer/Performer
Red Light (feat. Dej Loaf)	Jacquees	4275	2018	Co-Writer
Bossy	Ocean's 8 Movie Scene	Film Score	2018	Writer
Hell Fire (RetroValley)	HBO Trailer	unsigned	2019	Producer/Co-writer/Performer
Monster feat. Afro	BET TV Synch	Cop Watch: Reality Docu Series	2019	Artist/Writer/Singer/producer
Can't Keep Me Caged	BET TV Synch	Cop Watch: Reality Docu Series	2019	Artist/Writer/Singer/producer
The Old Groove	Griselda - Westside Gunn, Conway The Machine, Benny The Butcher	Shady Records	2020	Featured Artist/Writer/Rapper/Singer
Can't Keep Me Caged	Netflix Trailer/Commercial	13Th Documentary	2021	Artist/Writer/Singer/producer
A Sickness	Netflix Film Score	Monster	2021	Artist/Writer/Singer
Rise	STARZ	Power II: Book Of Ghost Season 1 Finale	2021	Artist/Writer/rapper/Producer
Wild Chapter Conway The Machine feat. T.I.	God Don't Make Mistakes	Shady Records	2021-2022	Featured Artist/Rapper/Singer
