= DJ Kay Slay =

American DJ (1966–2022)

Background information
- Also known as: The Drama King; Dez; Slap Your Favorite DJ
- Born: Keith Grayson; August 14, 1965; New York City, U.S.
- Died: April 17, 2022 (aged 56) New York City, U.S.
- Genres: Hip hop
- Occupations: Disc jockey; music promoter
- Years active: 1983–2022
- Labels: MNRK; Streetsweepers; Columbia

Keith Grayson (August 14, 1965 – April 17, 2022), known professionally as DJ Kay Slay, was an American disc jockey (DJ) from Manhattan, New York. He is referred to by The New York Times as "Hip Hop's One-Man Ministry of Insults". He released four studio albums: The Streetsweeper, Vol. 1 (2003), The Streetsweeper, Vol. 2 (2004), The Champions: North Meets South (with Greg Street; 2006), and More Than Just a DJ (2010). Known for extensive curation of prominent figures in East Coast hip-hop, his albums were met with success in the regional market; his first two were released by Columbia Records. Grayson died from COVID-19 in 2022.

== Early life ==
Grayson was born August 14, 1965, in New York City. He was born and raised in the East River Houses located in the East Harlem neighborhood of Manhattan. He was originally a prominent graffiti artist, having been featured in the 1983 hip hop documentary, Style Wars. One of Grayson's better known tags was "Dez". As a youth involved in New York's flourishing hip hop scene, Keith witnessed firsthand the ascent of legendary disc jockeys such as Grandmaster Flash, Grand Wizzard Theodore, and Kool DJ Red Alert, in the late 1970s and into the 1980s. "I didn't so much set out to be a DJ," he said. "It was just something to do that was fun and that I enjoyed doing." With the decline of the graffiti movement in the late 1980s, Dez began dealing with narcotics and consequently ended up in jail by the late 1980s. Grayson was released from jail in 1990, and claimed to have abstained from using drugs thereafter. In the early years of his life, he also met long-time friend Sauce Money, whom he was friends with until his death.

== Career ==
=== 2003–2009: Streetsweeper series ===
DJ Kay Slay released his debut album, The Streetsweeper, Vol. 1, on May 20, 2003. In the summer of 2003, Kay Slay released a single, accompanied by a music video, for a song titled "Too Much For Me". The single, which features a chorus sung by then-up-and-coming singer Amerie, also features verses from American rappers Birdman, Nas, and Foxy Brown. The song peaked at number 53 on the US Billboard Hot R&B/Hip-Hop Songs chart, making it the DJ's highest-charting single to date. The single's music video includes cameo appearances by Swizz Beatz, N.O.R.E., Raekwon, WC, and Lloyd Banks. Although the song was not a major success, its music video was aired on MTV Jams and BET. The "Too Much For Me" video did not feature Nas (because of Nas' solo projects) or Baby; so Loon was featured instead. This replacement started a feud between Nas and Kay Slay.

On March 30, 2004, Kay Slay's second album The Streetsweeper, Vol. 2, was released. Another single and video were released for "Who Gives A...Where You From" with Three 6 Mafia, which peaked at number 89 on the Hot R&B/Hip-Hop Songs. Kay Slay and the song were featured on the 2004 NFL Street video game.

=== 2010–2022: More Than Just a DJ and Rhyme or Die ===
After releasing More Than Just a DJ in 2010, Rhyme or Die was released. The first album's initial two singles "60 Second Assassins" featuring Busta Rhymes, Layzie Bone, Twista, and Jaz-O and "The Kings of the Streets" featuring DJ Khaled, DJ Drama, DJ Doo Wop, and Fly Nate were released in 2011. In 2013, "About That Life" featuring Fabolous, T-Pain, Rick Ross, Nelly, and French Montana was released as a single from Rhyme or Die. It debuted and peaked at #54 on the Hot R&B/Hip-Hop Songs chart, making it one of Kay Slay's most successful singles to date. In the beginning of 2014, "Free Again" was released featuring Fat Joe and 50 Cent, which came as a surprise for some seeing as how they had "beef" before, but later reconciled. In 2019 DJ Kay Slay Broke Bronx New York Rapper Bruse Wane's hit song Killa Soundboy live on his streets sweepers radio show. The Song Killa Soundboy featured Dj Kay Slay's protege Papoose. In 2021, Dj Kay Slay released the track "Rolling 110 Deep" which featured 110 hip hop artists with contributing verses from Ice-T, Shaq, Coke La Rock, KRS-One, Kool G Rap, Ghostface Killah, Roy Jones Jr, Omar Epps, and others.

== Illness and death ==
In January 2022, DJ Kay Slay's brother said he was in the hospital after contracting COVID-19, but was "in a recovery state". He died from COVID-19 in New York City, on April 17, 2022, at the age of 55.

The intersection of First Avenue and East 105th Street in East Harlem was renamed "DJ Kay Slay Way" in 2023.

== Discography ==
=== Studio albums ===
List of albums, with selected chart positions and certifications
Title	Album details	Peak chart positions	
Title	Album details	US	US R&B/HH
The Streetsweeper, Vol. 1	Released: May 20, 2003; Label: Streetsweepers, Columbia; Format: CD, download	22	4
The Streetsweeper, Vol. 2: The Pain from the Game	Released: March 30, 2004; Label: Streetsweepers, Columbia; Format: CD, download	27	10
More Than Just a DJ	Released: February 9, 2010; Label: Streetsweepers, E1; Format: CD, download	133	29
The Big Brother	Released: September 22, 2017; Label: Streetsweepers, Empire; Format: CD, download	—	—
Hip Hop Frontline	Released: January 25, 2019; Label: Streetsweepers, Empire; Format: CD, download	—	—
The Soul Controller	Released: December 17, 2021; Label: Streetsweepers, Empire; Format: CD, download	—	—

=== Collaborative albums ===
List of collaborative albums, with selected chart positions and certifications
Title	Album details	Peak chart positions	
Title	Album details	US	US R&B/HH
The Champions: North Meets South (with Greg Street)	Released: August 22, 2006; Label: Koch; Format: CD, download	57	17

=== Mixtapes ===
List of mixtapes, with year released
Title	Album details
The Month of the Bad Guy	Released: 2003; Label: Streetsweepers; Format: CD
The MySpace Maniac	Released: October 30, 2006; Label: Streetsweepers; Format: Download
Sign of the Times	Released: January 29, 2007; Label: Streetsweepers; Format: Download
Sign of the Times 2	Released: March 6, 2007; Label: Streetsweepers; Format: Download
Hate Is the New Love	Released: August 24, 2007; Label: Streetsweepers; Format: Download
The Return of the God	Released: December 21, 2007; Label: Streetsweepers; Format: Download
Blockstars	Released: October 18, 2009; Label: Streetsweepers; Format: Download
Blockstars 2	Released: November 16, 2009; Label: Streetsweepers; Format: Download
The God Is Back!	Released: August 24, 2010; Label: Streetsweepers; Format: Download
Long Live the King!	Released: October 11, 2010; Label: Streetsweepers; Format: Download
Redemption	Released: January 14, 2011; Label: Streetsweepers; Format: Download
The Soul Controller	Released: February 6, 2011; Label: Streetsweepers; Format: Download
The Changing of the Guard	Released: July 24, 2012; Label: Streetsweepers; Format: Download
Return of the Gate Keeper	Released: September 8, 2012; Label: Streetsweepers; Format: Download
Grown Man Hip-Hop	Released: November 19, 2012; Label: Streetsweepers; Format: Download
Grown Man Hip-Hop Part 2 (Sleepin' with the Enemy)	Released: January 23, 2013; Label: Streetsweepers; Format: Download
The Last Champion	Released: July 12, 2013; Label: Streetsweepers; Format: Download
The Rise of a City	Released: January 23, 2014; Label: Streetsweepers; Format: Download
The Last Hip Hop Disciple	Released: May 8, 2014; Label: Streetsweepers; Format: Download
The Original Man	Released: November 14, 2014; Label: Streetsweepers; Format: Download
The Industry Purge	Released: April 8, 2015; Label: Streetsweepers; Format: Download
Shadow of the Sun	Released: October 26, 2015; Label: Streetsweepers; Format: Download
50 Shades of Slay	Released: February 15, 2016; Label: Streetsweepers; Format: Download
The Rap Attack	Released: July 1, 2016; Label: Streetsweepers; Format: Download
Living Legend	Released: March 6, 2020; Label: Streetsweepers; Format: CD, download
Homage	Released: November 12, 2020; Label: Streetsweepers; Format: CD, download
Accolades	Released: June 25, 2021; Label: Streetsweepers; Format: CD, download

== Singles ==
Title	Year	Peak chart positions	Album
Title	Year	US R&B/HH	Album
"Too Much for Me" (featuring Nas, Baby, Foxy Brown and Amerie)	2003	53	The Streetsweeper, Vol. 1
"Not Your Average Joe" (featuring Fat Joe, Joe Budden and Joe)	2004	63	The Streetsweeper, Vol. 2
"Who Gives a Fuck Where You From" (featuring Three 6 Mafia, Lil Wyte and Frayser Boy)	2004	89	The Streetsweeper, Vol. 2
"Blockstars" (featuring Yo Gotti, Jim Jones, Busta Rhymes and Ray J)	2009	—	More Than Just a DJ
"Thug Luv" (featuring Maino, Papoose, Red Cafe and Ray J)	2010	112	More Than Just a DJ
"60 Second Assassins" (featuring Busta Rhymes, Layzie Bone, Twista and Jaz-O)	2011	—	Non-album singles
"The Kings of the Streets" (featuring DJ Khaled, DJ Drama, DJ Doo Wop and Fly Nate)	2011	75	Non-album singles
"About That Life" (featuring Fabolous, T-Pain, Rick Ross, Nelly and French Montana)	2013	54	Non-album singles
"Keep Calm" (featuring Juicy J, Jadakiss, 2 Chainz and Rico Love)	2013	—	Non-album singles
"Don't Do It" (featuring Fat Joe, French Montana and Rico Love)	2014	—	Non-album singles
"Hocus Pocus" (featuring A Boogie wit da Hoodie, Blueface and Moneybagg Yo)	2019	—	Non-album singles
"—" denotes a recording that did not chart or was not released in that territory.
