= El Chapo 3 =

2015 hip-hop mixtape album by Tony Yayo

El Chapo 3: The Great Escape

Mixtape by Tony Yayo
- Released: November 13, 2015
- Genre: Hip hop, East Coast hip hop
- Length: 34:13
- Label: G-Unit

Tony Yayo chronology
Godfather Of The Ghetto (2013)	El Chapo 3: The Great Escape (2015)

El Chapo 3: The Great Escape is a mixtape by American rapper Tony Yayo. The mixtape features exclusive tracks from Yayo with guest appearances from G-Unit affiliate Bolly.

It is the third installment of the El Chapo mixtape series, which dated back to 2011.

== Track listing ==
No.	Title	Length
1.	"Always In My Business"	3:49
2.	"Billionaire"	2:33
3.	"Weed And Money"	3:12
4.	"We Out Here"	3:12
5.	"That's Facts"	3:42
6.	"Cocaine" (featuring Bolly)	3:08
7.	"Attention Getting" (featuring Bolly)	2:05
8.	"Institutionalized"	2:54
9.	"Say Jesus"	3:19
10.	"Daylight"	3:28
11.	"Lord Can I"	2:59
