= Grafh =

American rapper

- Born: Phillip Anthony Bernard; August 22, 1982 (age 43)
- Origin: Queens, New York City, U.S.
- Genres: East Coast hip hop • gangsta rap
- Occupations: Rapper; songwriter
- Years active: 2000–present
- Labels: Team Bang Dope Gang; Stage One; Sony Urban Music; Epic Records; Black Hand Entertainment

Philip Anthony Bernard (born August 22, 1982), better known by his stage name Grafh, is an American rapper. His 2007 debut studio album, Autografh, was released through EMI and Virgin. Afterward, he parted ways with both labels.

Grafh has also been supported by several well-known artists, including Drake, Trinidad James and Raekwon. Actor Shia LaBeouf praised Grafh in a late-night interview with Carson Daly. In February 2014, Grafh released his mixtape New York Dxpe hosted by DJ Mr. FX. In 2016, Grafh collaborated with singer Melissa B. on the singles "Creep" and "The Greatest".

== Discography ==
=== Albums ===
- 2007: Autografh
- 2024: God's Timing (joint album with 38 Spesh)
- 2026: Sometimes Money Costs Too Much

=== Mixtapes ===
- 2003: The Bang Out
- 2004: The Oracle (Hosted by DJ Green Lantern)
- 2005: The Preview
- 2006: I Don't Care
- 2006: Make It Hot (Hosted by DJ Rob)
- 2006: Bring Dat Money Back (Hosted by Big Mike)
- 2006: MySpace Jumpoff (Hosted by Clinton Sparks)
- 2007: Black Hand America (Hosted by DJ Allure)
- 2008: The Oracle 2 (Hosted by DJ Green Lantern)
- 2009: Bring the Goons Out (Hosted by DJ Chaplin)
- 2010: Best of Grafh: Classic Sh*t, Pt. One
- 2010: From the Bottom (Hosted by Big Mike)
- 2011: Classic's (Hosted by DJ Whiteowl)
- 2011: Pain Killers (Hosted by Love Dinero)
- 2011: The Saturday Night EP (Collaboration with recording artist Shalone)
- 2011: The Sunday Morning EP (Collaboration with recording artist Shalone)
- 2014: New York Dxpe (Hosted by DJ Mr. FX)
- 2014: 88 Crack Era (Hosted by DJ Ted Smooth)
- 2016: Pain Killers: Reloaded
- 2019: Dirty Restaurant (Collaboration with recording artist Flee Lord)
- 2020: The Oracle 3 (Hosted by DJ Green Lantern)
- 2020: Good Energy
- 2021: Stop Calling Art Content (Hosted by DJ Shay)

=== Singles ===
- 2001: "Keeps It Gangsta"
- 2003: "Bang Out"
- 2004: "I Don't Care"
- 2008: "Like Ohh" (featuring Busta Rhymes & Prinz)
- 2008: "Bring the Goons Out" (featuring Sheek Louch)
- 2010: "Bout Dat" (featuring Jim Jones)
- 2010: "Knock 'Em Down" (featuring Waka Flocka Flame)
- 2011: "U Know How I Do It"
- 2011: "Another One"
- 2015: "Lord of Mercy"
- 2015: "The Come Up"
- 2015: "Ain't Near" (featuring Wiz Khalifa and Jadakiss)
- 2016: "Trap Phone Ringin'"
- 2016: "Creep" (featuring Melissa B.)
- 2016: "The Greatest (featuring. Melissa B.)
- 2016: "Wanna Know"
