= Cheech & Chong discography =

- Studio albums: 7
- Soundtrack albums: 2
- Compilation albums: 2
- Singles: 12
- Video albums: 1

This is the discography of American comedy duo Cheech & Chong.

== Albums ==
=== Studio albums ===
Title	Album details	Peak chart positions				Certifications
Title	Album details	US	AUS	CAN	NZ	Certifications
Cheech and Chong	Released: August 1971; Label: Ode; Formats: LP, MC, 8-track	28	—	43	35	US: Gold
Big Bambú	Released: June 1972; Label: Ode; Formats: LP, MC, 8-track	2	—	10	—	US: Gold
Los Cochinos	Released: August 1973; Label: Ode; Formats: LP, MC, 8-track	2	—	4	—	US: Gold
Cheech & Chong's Wedding Album	Released: September 1974; Label: Ode; Formats: LP, MC, 8-track	5	18	6	21	CAN: Gold; US: Gold
Sleeping Beauty	Released: May 1976; Label: Ode; Formats: LP, MC, 8-track	25	84	35	—	
Let's Make a New Dope Deal	Released: March 1980; Label: Warner Bros.; Formats: LP, MC, 8-track	173	—	—	33	
Get Out of My Room	Released: August 1985; Label: MCA; Formats: LP, MC	71	96	—	—	US: Gold
"—" denotes releases that did not chart or were not released in that territory.

=== Soundtrack albums ===
Title	Album details	Peak chart positions	
Title	Album details	US	AUS
Up in Smoke	Released: November 1978; Label: Warmer Bros./Ode; Formats: LP, MC, 8-track	162	80
Cheech & Chong's Animated Movie!	Released: April 9, 2013; Label: Friday Music/Ode; Formats: CD, digital download	—	—
"—" denotes releases that did not chart or were not released in that territory.

=== Compilation albums ===
Title	Album details	Peak chart position		
Title	Album details	US	AUS	NZ
Cheech & Chong's Greatest Hit	Released: September 1981; Label: Warmer Bros.; Formats: LP, MC, 8-track	201	68	39
Where There's Smoke There's Cheech & Chong	Released: March 2002; Label: Rhino/Warner Bros.; Formats: CD	—	—	—
"—" denotes releases that did not chart or were not released in that territory.

=== Video albums ===
Title	Album details
Get Out of My Room	Released: November 1985; Label: CIC Video; Formats: VHS

== Singles ==
Titles (A-side, B-side) Both sides from same album except where indicated	Year	Peak chart positions					Album
Titles (A-side, B-side) Both sides from same album except where indicated	Year	US	US R&B	AUS	CAN	NZ	Album
"Santa Claus and His Old Lady" b/w "Dave" (from Cheech and Chong)	1971	— (Note: "Santa Claus and His Old Lady" peaked at number 3 on the Christmas Singles chart. In years when the chart was published, songs that appeared on the chart were ineligible for the Hot 100.)	—	—	—	—	Non-album single
"Basketball Jones featuring Tyrone Shoelaces" b/w "Don't Bug Me"	1973	15	58	—	36	—	Los Cochinos
"Sister Mary Elephant" b/w "Wink Dinkerson" (from Cheech and Chong)	1973	24	—	—	50	—	Big Bambú
"Earache My Eye" b/w "Turn That Thing Down" (Non-album track)	1974	9	—	26	4	—	Cheech & Chong's Wedding Album
"Black Lassie" b/w "Coming Attractions"	1974	55	—	—	71	—	Cheech & Chong's Wedding Album
"(How I Spent My Summer Vacation) Or a Day at the Beach with Pedro & Man" (Parts I and II)	1975	54	—	—	—	—	Non-album single
"Framed" b/w "Pedro's Request"	1976	41	—	—	68	—	Sleeping Beauty
"Bloat On" b/w "Just Say "Right On" (The Bloaters' Creed)" (Non-album track)	1977	41	56	78	—	40	Let's Make a New Dope Deal
"Rudolph the Red-Nosed Reindeer" b/w "Santa Claus and His Old Lady" (Non-album track)	1977	—	—	—	—	—	Let's Make a New Dope Deal
"Up in Smoke" b/w "Rock Fight"	1978	—	—	—	—	—	Up in Smoke
"Born in East L.A." b/w "I'm A (Modern) Man"	1985	48	—	53	—	49	Get Out of My Room
"I'm Not Home Right Now" b/w "Hot Saki" (Non-album track)	1985	—	—	—	—	—	Get Out of My Room
"—" denotes releases that did not chart or were not released in that territory.
