= Where There's Smoke There's Cheech & Chong =

Compilation album by Cheech & Chong
- Released: 2002
- Genre: Comedy
- Length: 2:35:15
- Label: Rhino / WEA

Cheech & Chong chronology
Get Out of My Room (1985)	Where There's Smoke There's Cheech & Chong (2002)

Where There's Smoke There's Cheech & Chong is the second compilation album by the comedy duo Cheech & Chong. Released in 2002, it collects the duo's most popular comedy routines and songs from their eight studio albums, and additional rare material, including tracks that are exclusive to this set, including radio commercials for the film Up in Smoke, "(How I Spent My Summer Vacation) Or A Day At The Beach With Pedro & Man" and "Santa Claus And His Old Lady", which were previously only released as singles, and a live recording of the duo performing the "Old Man In The Park" sketch.

== Content ==
Much of the content on Where There's Smoke There's Cheech & Chong derives from the albums Cheech and Chong, Big Bambu, Los Cochinos, Cheech & Chong's Wedding Album, Sleeping Beauty and Let's Make a New Dope Deal. The title track from the Up in Smoke soundtrack is also included, as well as "Born in East L.A.", from the album Get Out of My Room.

The anthology also includes the tracks "Santa Claus And His Old Lady" and "(How I Spent My Summer Vacation) Or A Day At The Beach With Pedro & Man-Part 1", which were previously only available as singles, and on compilations, but had not appeared on any previous Cheech & Chong release. The "How I Spent My Summer Vacation" single contained a second part which is not featured on this compilation and is otherwise unavailable.

Exclusive to the anthology were two radio commercials for the film Up in Smoke, and a live recording of the sketch "Old Man in the Park", which had not been recorded for any Cheech & Chong album. Also, at the time of the anthology's release, the albums Sleeping Beauty, Let's Make A New Dope Deal and Get Out Of My Room were out of print, although they have since been reissued.

The tracks "Santa Claus and His Old Lady", "Earache My Eye" and "Born in East L.A." were commercial hits.

Liner notes for the anthology were written by Dr. Demento.

== Reception ==
Professional ratings
Review scores
Source	Rating
AllMusic	4.5/5 stars

AllMusic reviewer Richie Unterberger described the material on Where There's Smoke There's Cheech & Chong as being "more juvenile than it is funny", appraising the duo's sound design and musical satires, singling the tracks "Blind Melon Chitlin'", "Framed", and "Earache My Eye" as highlights.

== Track listing ==
All tracks are written by Cheech & Chong, except where noted.

Disc 1
No.	Title	Writer(s)	Length
1.	"Dave" (from the album Cheech and Chong (1971))	Cheech & Chong, Chick Corea	1:24
2.	"Blind Melon Chitlin'" (from the album Cheech and Chong (1971))		4:21
3.	"Wink Dinkerson" (from the album Cheech and Chong (1971))		2:58
4.	"Acapulco Gold Filters" (from the album Cheech and Chong (1971))		2:50
5.	"Cruisin' With Pedro De Pacas" (from the album Cheech and Chong (1971))		3:56
6.	"Trippin' In Court" (from the album Cheech and Chong (1971))		5:57
7.	"Santa Claus and His Old Lady" (originally released as a single on Ode Records, ODE 66021 (1971))		6:25
8.	"Sister Mary Elephant" (from the album Big Bambu (1972))		3:35
9.	"Ralph and Herbie" (from the album Big Bambu (1972))		3:24
10.	"Continuing Adventures of Pedro De Pacas and Man" (from the album Big Bambu (1972))		6:27
11.	"Let's Make A Dope Deal" (from the album Big Bambu (1972))		3:59
12.	"Sargent Stadanko" (from the album Los Cochinos (1973))		6:32
13.	"The Strawberry Revival Festival" (from the album Los Cochinos (1973))		3:26
14.	"Evelyn Woodhead Speed Reading Course" (from the album Los Cochinos (1973))		0:38
15.	"White World Of Sports" (from the album Los Cochinos (1973))		2:57
16.	"Basketball Jones" (from the album Los Cochinos (1973))		4:06
17.	"Pedro and Man at the Drive-Inn" (from the album Los Cochinos (1973))		12:43

Disc 2
No.	Title	Writer(s)	Length
1.	"Earache My Eye" (from the album Cheech & Chong's Wedding Album (1974))	Cheech & Chong, Gaye DeLorme	5:20
2.	"Championship Wrestling" (from the album Cheech & Chong's Wedding Album (1974))		6:51
3.	"Wake Up America" (from the album Cheech & Chong's Wedding Album (1974))		5:05
4.	"Black Lassie (A Great American Dog)" (from the album Cheech & Chong's Wedding Album (1974))	Cheech & Chong, Billy Page, Gene Page	3:49
5.	"Wake Up America (Conclusion)" (from the album Cheech & Chong's Wedding Album (1974))		1:11
6.	"(How I Spent My Summer Vacation) Or A Day At The Beach With Pedro & Man-Part 1" (originally released as a single on Ode Records, ODE-66115-S (1975))		4:38
7.	"The Big Sniff" (from the album Sleeping Beauty (1976))		4:57
8.	"Pedro's Request" (from the album Sleeping Beauty (1976))		3:44
9.	"Framed" (from the album Sleeping Beauty (1976))	Chong, Leiber, Marin, Stoller	2:42
10.	"Up In Smoke" (from the album Up in Smoke (1978))		3:17
11.	"Bloat On" (from the album Let's Make a New Dope Deal (1980))	Chong, Ingram, Marin, Mitchell, Willis	4:59
12.	"Let's Make A New Dope Deal" (from the album Let's Make a New Dope Deal (1980))		5:33
13.	"Acupuncture" (from the album Let's Make a New Dope Deal (1980))		5:02
14.	"Moe Money/Rudolph The Red Nosed Reindeer" (from the album Let's Make a New Dope Deal (1980))	Marks	5:19
15.	"Born In East L.A." (from the album Get Out of My Room (1985))	Chong, Marin, Springsteen	4:53
16.	"Up In Smoke Commercial (I)" (previously unreleased)		1:05
17.	"Up In Smoke Commercial (II)" (previously unreleased)		1:03
18.	"Academy Of Music/NY Concert Commercial" (previously unreleased)		1:07
19.	"Old Man In The Park" (previously unreleased; live recording)		9:01

== Personnel ==
From Warner Bros./Ode Sounds & Visual/Rhino's 2002 2-CD release R2 74265 liner notes

- Cheech & Chong

"Basketball Jones" Musicians: Tyrone Shoelaces & Rap Brown Jr. H.S. Band

- George Harrison: guitar
- Klaus Voormann: bass
- Jim Karsten: drums
- Jim Keltner: percussion
- Carole King: electric piano
- Nicky Hopkins: piano
- Billy Preston: organ
- Tom Scott: saxophone
- George Bohanon, Dick "Slyde" Hyde & Paul Hubinon: horny guys

Cheerleaders:

- The Blossoms: Darlene Love, Fanita Jones & Jean King
- Michelle "Trixie" Phillips

Sister Mary Elephant Santana St. School 6th Grade Class:

- Rae Dawn Chong, Robbie Chong, Sherry Goffin, Kierk Goodwich, Scott Harper, Nolia Kienholz, Leslie Manikas, Leslie Oyler, Bonnie Pollei, Lisa Romane, Jill & Scott Smith

"Framed" Musicians:

- Tim Weston, David Bluefield & Ricky Fataar
- Arranged & Conducted by: Tom Scott

"Up In Smoke" Musicians:

- Danny "Kootch" Kortchmar: guitars
- Waddy Wachtel: guitars
- Stanley Sheldon: bass
- Andy Muson: bass
- Rick Marotta: drums
- Bobby Jay La Kind: percussion
- Jai Winding: keyboard
- David Sanborn: saxophone
- Gene Page: horn arrangements

"Bloat On"

- Arranged and conducted by David Foster
