= Cheech & Chong's Greatest Hit =

Greatest hits album by Cheech & Chong
- Released: 1981
- Recorded: 1971–80
- Genre: Comedy
- Length: 54:16
- Label: Warner Bros.
- Producer: Lou Adler

Cheech & Chong chronology
Cheech & Chong's Greatest Hit (1981)	Where There's Smoke There's Cheech & Chong (2002)

Professional ratings
Review scores
Source	Rating
Allmusic	4.5/5 stars

Cheech & Chong's Greatest Hit is the first compilation album by the comedy duo Cheech & Chong. A greatest hits album, it features some of the duo's best known bits. Some tracks were edited for this release: most notably, the 1:34 track "Dave" is broken into two separate tracks, and is edited down for time. Also, "Earache My Eye" fades out just before the start of the argument between father and son.

== Track listing ==
=== Side 1 ===
1. Dave 0:39
2. Earache My Eye 2:28
3. Let's Make a Dope Deal 3:56
4. Basketball Jones 4:00
5. Blind Melon Chitlin' 4:20
6. Sister Mary Elephant 3:30
7. Sargent Stadanko 6:30
8. Dave (continued) 0:16

=== Side 2 ===
1. Cruisin' With Pedro De Pacas 3:51
2. The Continuing Adventures Of Pedro De Pacas And Man 6:00
3. Pedro And Man At The Drive-Inn 12:44
4. Trippin' In Court 5:57

=== Charts ===
Chart (1981)	Peak position
Australian (Kent Music Report)	68

== See also ==
- Cheech & Chong
