= Cochino =

Cochino ("pig") may refer to:

- Cochino, the Cuban name of the triggerfish Balistes vetula
- USS Cochino (SS-345), a United States Navy submarine commissioned in 1945 and lost in 1949
- Bahía de los Cochinos, the Spanish-language name for the Bay of Pigs in Cuba
- Cayos Cochinos, two small islands off the northern coast of Honduras
- Los Cochinos, a 1973 comedy album by Cheech and Chong
