= Brighter Side of Darkness =

American soul musical group

- Origin: Chicago, Illinois, United States
- Genres: R&B, Soul
- Years active: 1971–1974
- Label: 20th Century Records

Brighter Side of Darkness was an American R&B/soul group. They were formed in 1971 at Calumet High School in Chicago, Illinois. Their lead singers were Ralph Eskridge and 12-year-old Darryl Lamont. The other members were Randolph Murph and Larry Washington.

They released the single "Love Jones" in August 1972. It was a hit in the US (Hot 100, #16; Hot Soul Singles, #3) and was certified gold by the RIAA on February 9, 1973. They released an album, Love Jones, in 1973. Their second single, "I Owe You Love", was less successful, and the group disbanded in 1974, after all but Darryl Lamont were fired and rebranded "The Imaginations."

An updated, more mature version of "Love Jones" was recorded in 1975 by The Imaginations (after Lamont left) and later the song was recorded by Doctor Ice of UTFO featuring Full Force and Cheryl Pepsii Riley. In addition, "Love Jones" was parodied as "Basketball Jones" by Cheech and Chong and Paul Gruwell in 1973. The parody was released as a single in August 1973 and reached #15 on the Hot 100.

== Discography ==
- Love Jones (20th Century Records, 1973) US R&B Albums #35
