= Still Smokin (film) =

1983 film by Tommy Chong

- Theatrical release poster
- Directed by: Tommy Chong
- Written by: Tommy Chong; Cheech Marin
- Produced by: Peter MacGregor-Scott
- Starring: Cheech Marin; Tommy Chong
- Cinematography: Harvey Harrison
- Edited by: James Coblentz; Ian Crafford; David Ramirez
- Music by: George S. Clinton
- Distributed by: Paramount Pictures
- Release date: May 6, 1983
- Running time: 91 min
- Country: United States
- Language: English
- Box office: $15,543,710

Still Smokin is a 1983 American comedy film directed by Tommy Chong, featuring Cheech & Chong sketches with a wraparound story involving the duo arriving in Amsterdam for a film festival. While the film grossed $15 million, it received predominantly negative reviews.

== Plot ==
Cheech Marin and Tommy Chong play versions of themselves being invited to Amsterdam for a film festival devoted to Burt Reynolds and Dolly Parton. After initially assuming that Cheech was Reynolds, the promoter soon finds out that neither Reynolds nor Parton will appear, forcing the festival to be canceled. In need of a replacement act, he goes to Cheech and Chong for help, and the duo happily volunteers to give a live stand-up performance.

Most of the sketches are presented as cutaways, culminating in their live performance (filmed at the Tuschinski Theater in September 1982) ending with the Ralph and Herbie routine.

== Cast ==
- Cheech Marin as Cheech
- Tommy Chong as Chong "Man"
- Hans Man in 't Veld as Promoter
- Carol van Herwijnen as Hotel Manager
- Shireen Strooker as Assistant Manager
- Susan Hahn as Hotel Maid
- Arjan Ederveen as Bellboy #1
- Kees Prins as Bellboy #2
- Mariette Bout as Barge Waitress
- Fabiola as Barge Lady
- Carla van Amstel as Queen Beatrix

== Reception ==
Vincent Canby of The New York Times wrote, "With Still Smokin, Cheech Marin and Tommy Chong are scraping the bottom of the barrel and finding only bits and pieces of the characters and comedy routines that were so successful in their earlier films." Variety panned the film as an "amateurish, incompetent excuse for filmmaking." Gene Siskel of the Chicago Tribune gave the film one star out of four, writing that it "barely qualifies as a movie," adding, "Smokin' indicates Cheech and Chong's disrespect for their own audience and makes some of their other miserable films look good by comparison." Richard Harrington of The Washington Post wrote, "Richard 'Cheech' Marin and Thomas Chong are 'Still Smokin''—that's even the name of their latest film venture—but the daffy fires that often lit their four previous films are in danger of extinction. Or, to put it in terms they and their friends surely will understand, it's down to seeds and stems." Linda Gross of the Los Angeles Times wrote, "This is the same old stuff. The humor, if you can call it such, is crass, crude, predictable, scatological, lascivious and lame." Leonard Maltin's film guide gave it the lowest possible grade of BOMB and called it "Rock-bottom. Not even the most forgiving C & C fans can justify this nonmovie that climaxes a scant plot involving an Amsterdam film festival with twenty minutes of laughless concert footage."

According to Stuart Henderson, the film is "lazily offensive in its attempts to be funny,". It has a score of 3.2/10 on Rotten Tomatoes, alongside a 10% rating based on ten reviews.
