= Born in East L.A. =

Born in East L.A. may refer to:

- "Born in East L.A." (song), a song by Cheech & Chong
- Born in East L.A. (film), a film starred and directed by Cheech Marin
