= David Ramírez =

David Ramírez may refer to:

- David Ramírez (footballer, born 1981), Argentine football midfielder
- David Ramírez (footballer, born 1993), Costa Rican football forward
- David Ramírez (footballer, born 1995), Mexican football right-back
- David Noel Ramírez Padilla (1950–2025), dean of the Monterrey Institute of Technology
- David Ramirez (film editor), American film and television editor
- David Ramirez (musician) (born 1983), American musician from Texas
