= Sister Mary Elephant =

Single by Cheech and Chong

from the album Big Bambu
- B-side: "Wink Dinkerson"
- Released: December 1973
- Genre: Comedy, stoner comedy, spoken word
- Length: 3:38
- Label: Ode
- Songwriters: Cheech Marin; Tommy Chong
- Producer: Lou Adler

Cheech and Chong singles chronology
""Santa Claus and His Old Lady""	"Sister Mary Elephant"	""Basketball Jones featuring Tyrone Shoelaces""

"Sister Mary Elephant" is a comedy sketch by Cheech and Chong. The recording appeared on the duo's second album, Big Bambu, released in 1972. It was re-released as a single in 1973 and peaked at No. 24 on the Billboard Hot 100 and No. 50 in Canada in early 1974. It is one of very few entirely spoken-word recordings (with no singing or musical accompaniment) to make the top 40 of the Billboard Hot 100.

The picture sleeve for the record was illustrated by Paul Gruwell.

== Synopsis ==
The title character is an exceedingly prissy nun substitute teacher (played by Cheech Marin) teaching in a parochial school ("Our Lady of 115th Street") classroom of exceedingly irreverent, noisy teenage boys (all played by Cheech and Tommy Chong through overdubbing). She attempts to teach the class, but the boys totally ignore her. She then tries to get the students' attention by speaking increasingly loudly, to no avail. When she finally screams, "SHUT UP!" at the top of her lungs, in startling contrast to her usually placid manner, dead silence ensues. She follows this with a once again prissy "Thank you". This becomes a running joke throughout the skit.

Sister Mary Elephant announces that she is the substitute for their regular teacher, Sister Rosetta Stone (a pun on both the Rosetta Stone and gospel singer Sister Rosetta Tharpe), who has sent her love and the artwork she is making: fingerpaintings and dustcloths, indicating that she has likely been institutionalized. After introducing herself, the class erupts in laughter upon hearing her name, prompting a repetition of the "SHUT UP!"/"Thank you" routine. Sister Mary Elephant then asks a student to give her his knife. He complies, but not quite the way she had in mind (it is heard flying and sticking in the wall with a twang). She responds with another prissy "Thank you". She continues to try to teach the class, during which they continue talking, necessitating further repetitions of her screaming.

Sister Mary Elephant tells the class that they will read their previously assigned essays on "How I Spent My Summer Vacation". She chooses one boy (Chong), who stands up and reads in a monotone voice how on the first day he woke up, went downtown to look for a job, then hung out in front of the drugstore. Another student (voiced by Cheech) asks if it's the one on 13th but gets no answer. Chong repeatedly describes this same daily routine verbatim for each day of his vacation as well. Sister Mary tries to get the student to stop reading, but he ignores her and continues, finally noting that on the third day he got a job keeping people from hanging out in front of the drugstore. Sister Mary beseeches the boy to "SHUT UP!" before he can continue any further. A student (Chong) had started asking to "go to the can", and does so repeatedly during the students reading but is ignored entirely by Sister Mary. Several times the sound of flatulence is heard implying he has diarrhea or that the students are making fart sounds.

Sister Mary Elephant then reads from a book of excessively flowery poetry. The class responds with their usual razzing then fall silent except for scattered snoring after a few verses. In a variation on the running joke, she screams for the class to "WAKE UP!" The sketch ends here with Chong declaring "I gotta go to the can, man."

== Sergeant Stadanko ==
The character of Sister Mary Elephant reappeared in a later Cheech and Chong skit, "Sergeant Stadanko", on their Los Cochinos album. The nun introduces the titular narcotics officer (Chong) as a guest speaker. Her rowdy classroom immediately falls silent at the mention of Stadanko's profession. Later one student (Cheech) rats out another student, Billy (Chong), to Stadanko for selling him oregano packaged as marijuana. The students begin fighting and Sister Mary beseeches Stadanko to intervene. Stadanko sheepishly informs her that he will call the police.

On the compilation album Cheech & Chong's Greatest Hit, "Sister Mary Elephant" and "Sergeant Stadanko" appear back-to-back.

== Legacy ==
The "SHUT UP!" portion was used as a sound bite on Imus in the Morning.
