= Where There's Smoke =

Where There's Smoke is an allusion to the saying where there's smoke, there's fire, and may refer to:

- Where There's Smoke..., a 1979 album by Smokey Robinson
- Where There's Smoke (The Cruel Sea album), 2001
- Where There's Smoke.. (Gibson/Miller Band album), 1993
  - "Where There's Smoke", this album's title track, later recorded by Archer/Park
- "Where There's Smoke" (The Brady Bunch), an episode of The Brady Bunch
- "Where There's Smoke..." (Sex and the City), an episode of Sex and the City
- "Where There's Smoke" (Superman: The Animated Series), an episode of Superman: The Animated Series
- "Where There's Smoke" (That's So Raven), an episode of That's So Raven
- Where There's Smoke, a 1993 novel by Sandra Brown

== See also ==
- Where There's Smoke There's Cheech & Chong, a 2002 comedy album by Cheech & Chong
- "Where There's Smoke There's Fired", an episode of Frasier
- No Smoke Without Fire, a 1978 album by Wishbone Ash
- "No Smoke Without a Fire", a 1989 song by English rock group Bad Company.
