= Santa Claus and His Old Lady =

Single by Cheech and Chong
- B-side: "Dave"
- Released: December 1971
- Genre: Novelty, Christmas
- Length: 6:25
- Label: Ode Records
- Songwriters: Cheech Marin; Tommy Chong
- Producer: Lou Adler

Cheech and Chong singles chronology
"Santa Claus and His Old Lady" (1971)	"Sister Mary Elephant" (1973)

"Santa Claus and His Old Lady" is a bit by Cheech and Chong, one of their best-known comedy routines. It was the duo's first single.

"Santa Claus and His Old Lady" did not appear on the duo's eponymous debut album, although the B-side, "Dave", did.

== Synopsis ==
The sketch begins with Cheech at the piano attempting to write a parody of "¿Dónde Está Santa Claus?" (Spanish for "Where Is Santa Claus?"), a Christmas song by Augie Rios from 1958, to little success. Chong enters, at which point he reveals that he has never heard of Santa Claus (Chong repeatedly mistakes Santa Claus for a musician).

Cheech then explains the story of Santa Claus, but from an unusual perspective. In 1966, Santa and his wife began in the projects in an apartment next door to Cheech, after which, in no small part due to a combination of excessive noise from "hammering and pounding all night" and the cannabis-infused brownies for which Mrs. Claus became known, they were driven out and formed a commune at the North Pole with a large group of midgets, supporting themselves with welfare and food stamps. Cheech explains that the reason Santa's sleigh can fly is because he "took the freeway" and liberally used "magic dust" (on his reindeer and himself), while uncomfortable experiences with Border Patrol and Southerners who threatened to cut off his hair and beard prompted him to go underground. According to Cheech, Santa Claus now works undercover as a Salvation Army bell-ringer, at which point Chong once again, and more certainly this time, asserts he really had played music with Santa Claus.

In contrast to most of their other sketches, Cheech and Chong play fictionalized versions of themselves in this bit. (Chong himself was a musician before beginning his collaboration with Cheech, most prominently as a songwriter and vocalist for Bobby Taylor & the Vancouvers in the late 1960s; he somewhat fictionalizes this in the song, however, stating not that he is from his real hometown of Vancouver, but instead from Pittsburgh.)

== Chart performance ==
"Santa Claus and His Old Lady" peaked at number 4 on the Billboard Christmas Singles chart upon its release in 1971, then peaked again at number 3 on the same chart in 1972 and 1973. (Entries on any given week's Christmas Singles chart were ineligible for the corresponding edition of the Hot 100 at the time.) In 1997, the record entered the Mainstream Rock Tracks chart and peaked at number 38 there.

== Dave ==
The B-side was "Dave", one of the duo's earliest and most famous sketches. In this sketch, a man named Dave (Cheech), who is apparently on the run from the police, attempts to enter the locked apartment of his roommate (Chong), who will not answer the door. As Dave repeatedly tries to identify himself, the roommate instead thinks he is asking for Dave, and replies "Dave's not here."
