= Basketball Jones featuring Tyrone Shoelaces =

Single by Cheech and Chong

from the album Los Cochinos
- B-side: "Don't Bug Me"
- Released: August 1973
- Genre: Comedy rock, hard rock, novelty song, soul
- Length: 4:04
- Label: Ode
- Songwriters: Cheech Marin; Thomas Chong
- Producer: Lou Adler

Cheech and Chong singles chronology
"Sister Mary Elephant"	"Basketball Jones featuring Tyrone Shoelaces"	"Earache My Eye"

"Basketball Jones featuring Tyrone Shoelaces" is a song by Cheech and Chong that first appeared on the 1973 album Los Cochinos.

== Background ==
Sung in falsetto by Cheech Marin, playing the title character Tyrone (as in "tie-your-own") Shoelaces, it tells the story of Shoelaces's love of basketball. It is a parody of the No. 16 Billboard Hot 100 song "Love Jones" by Brighter Side of Darkness. In the album version, the song is preceded by a mock interview with Jones' basketball coach named "Umgwana Kickbooti" (a parody of a Wide World of Sports interview), conducted by a character named "Red Blazer".

The song's opening lyric, "basketball jones, I got a basketball jones", references "jones" as slang for craving or addiction. A "basketball jones" thus refers to loving basketball so much that it overtakes all other thoughts.

Musicians who appeared on the record included George Harrison, Billy Preston, Tom Scott, Klaus Voormann, and Carole King (the record became the highest-peaking single on which she appeared during 1973). The Blossoms and Michelle Phillips (from The Mamas & the Papas) performed vocals as cheerleaders on the track.

Some notes on the recording of the track, taken from the booklet accompanying Where There's Smoke There's Cheech & Chong, read:

Cheech sings, and Tommy plays piano—that's all it was at first. In Cheech's words, "George Harrison and those guys were in the next studio recording, and so Lou [Adler] just ran over there and played [it for him]. They made up the track right on the spot." "That was a wild session," Lou Adler recalls. "I probably called Carole [King] and told her to come down, but with Harrison and [Klaus] Voorman—I didn't call and say come in and play. Everyone happened to be in the A&M studios at that particular time, doing different projects. It was spilling out of the studio into the corridors."

Other members of the ad hoc supergroup included Nicky Hopkins (piano), Tom Scott (sax), Billy Preston (organ), Jimmy Karstein (drums), and Jim Keltner (percussion).

== Personnel ==
- Cheech Marin – Tyrone Shoelaces (voice)
- George Harrison – electric guitar
- Klaus Voormann – bass guitar
- Jim Karstein – drums
- Jim Keltner – percussion
- Carole King – electric piano
- Nicky Hopkins – piano
- Tom Scott – saxophone
- Billy Preston – organ

Cheerleaders (backing vocalists)

- Darlene Love
- Fanita James
- Jean King
- Michelle Phillips
- Ronnie Spector

Horny Guys (brass players)

- George Bohanon
- Dick "Slyde" Hyde
- Paul Hubison

Others

- Sister Mary Elephant
- Santana Street School 6th Grade Class

== Chart performance ==
The song was released as a single in August 1973 and reached No. 15 on the Billboard Hot 100, becoming the only spoof to peak higher than the corresponding original. It was backed with "Don't Bug Me", also from Los Cochinos. To coincide with the graffiti artwork from the album's cover, both sides of the single feature the Ode label covered with graffiti.

Chart (1973)	Peak position
Canada RPM	36
U.S. Billboard Hot 100	15
U.S. Billboard Hot Soul Singles	58

== Animated film ==
Tyrone Shoelaces

Basketball Jones is a 1973 animated short film based on the Cheech and Chong song. The cartoon was created to promote the song's release in the United States. It is about a teenager named Tyrone Shoelaces and his love of basketball. The short was created by animator Paul Gruwell who was known at the time for The Banana Splits.

In the animation, Shoelaces, who appears as a stereotypical African American, is shown from birth having a skill for "dribbling" (in which he is shown to be drooling) and, as a result, his mother gives him a basketball for a gift. Shoelaces takes an immediate liking to the ball and takes it wherever he goes. This sets up a trip to the "basketball championship," in which he begins preaching to potential teammates, coaches, cheerleaders (complete with "day of the week" panties visible) to "help him out." A gospel chorus begins singing, and slowly escalates. A few short shots of Shoelaces actually playing basketball, mostly dribbling downcourt on a breakaway, are visible, but the rest of the video is primarily devoted to shots of increasingly unusual and distant people in "the entire stadium" and "around the world" singing along to "Basketball Jones." At the end of the short, Shoelaces begins growing at a dramatic pace, breaking through the stadium roof and becoming big enough to use the moon as a basketball while Cheech and Chong, Viet Cong, King Kong, alley cats, men in business suits, a mountaintop guru, The Singing Nun, and The Beatles sing along to the song. The short film encapsulates the political moods of the 70s and predicts Richard Nixon's impeachment before the president actually resigned on August 8, 1974.

"Basketball Jones" was originally seen in theaters in late 1973, before showings of Hal Ashby's The Last Detail at select screens. It can be seen during the 1974 film California Split, directed by Robert Altman, although its use in the film prevented California Split from being released on VHS or Laserdisc due to Columbia Pictures' refusal to pay royalties for the song. Altman later removed the song (but not the cartoon) from the film so it could be released on DVD.

The film was broadcast in the United Kingdom on February 24, 1974, during an episode of the BBC television program, The Old Grey Whistle Test.

The cartoon was re-released in 1976, when it was shown before the film Tunnel Vision. The film is perhaps best known for being featured in another highly acclaimed Hal Ashby film, the 1979 Oscar-nominated Being There, where Peter Sellers's character, Chauncey Gardiner watches the cartoon in a limousine.

== Cover versions ==
- The song was covered by Barry White and Chris Rock in the 1996 film Space Jam. Rock performed the higher-pitched vocals and shouted lines.

== Popular culture ==
- The animated short is watched by the character "Chance" in the 1979 film Being There.
- The song is featured in a 2008 commercial for the television series House of Payne.
- The song is also featured on the season 22 episode of The Simpsons, "A Midsummer's Nice Dream".
