= Cheech and Chong (album) =

Cheech And Chong

Studio album by Cheech & Chong
- Released: August 1971
- Recorded: 1971
- Genre: Comedy
- Length: 37:56
- Labels: Ode, Warner Bros., WEA
- Producer: Lou Adler

Cheech & Chong chronology
Cheech And Chong (1971)	Big Bambu (1972)

Professional ratings
Review scores
Source	Rating
AllMusic	4.5/5 stars

Cheech And Chong is the 1971 debut album of Cheech & Chong, produced by Lou Adler. It features "Dave", one of their most famous routines. The album peaked at No. 28 on the Billboard Top LP's & Tape chart the week of March 4, 1972. The album was nominated for Best Comedy Recording at the 14th Grammy Awards, but lost to Lily Tomlin's This Is a Recording.

At Christmas that year, a single was released with "Dave" on the B-side and with "Santa Claus and His Old Lady" (a sketch not available on any of the duo's LPs, but it does appear on a Dr Demento compilation) on the A-side. The single peaked at No. 38.

The album cover art is by Paul Gruwell.

== Track listing ==
All tracks by Cheech Marin and Tommy Chong, except where noted.

Side 1 (UNO)
No.	Title	Length
1.	"Blind Melon Chitlin'"	4:22
2.	"Wink Dinkerson"	2:58
3.	"Acapulco Gold Filters"	2:50
4.	"Vietnam"	3:07
5.	"Trippin' In Court"	5:56

Side 2 (YE)
No.	Title	Length
6.	"Dave"	1:25
7.	"Emergency Ward"	3:34
8.	"Welcome to Mexico"	2:48
9.	"The Pope: Live at the Vatican"	1:55
10.	"Cruisin' With Pedro De Pacas"	3:56
11.	"Waiting for Dave"	5:05

== Production ==
- Produced by Lou Adler
- Recorded & engineered by Norman Kinney
