= Cheech & Chong's Animated Movie =

Cheech & Chong's Animated Movie!
- Promotional poster
- Directed by: Branden Chambers; Eric D. Chambers
- Written by: Tommy Chong; Cheech Marin
- Produced by: Houston Curtis; Branden Chambers; Eric Chambers; Lou Adler
- Starring: Cheech Marin; Tommy Chong
- Edited by: Eric D. Chambers; Kevin C. Murray
- Music by: Steve Pacey; Dominic Kelly
- Production companies: Houston Curtis Pictures; Chambers Brothers Animation
- Distributed by: 20th Century Fox
- Release date: March 18, 2013
- Running time: 83 minutes
- Country: United States
- Language: English

Cheech & Chong's Animated Movie! is a 2013 American adult animated stoner comedy film by Branden Chambers and Eric D. Chambers. It stars comedy duo Cheech and Chong in their first feature film since 1984's The Corsican Brothers, and the first to feature them as animated characters. The film features several of their original comedy bits such as "Sister Mary Elephant", "Sgt. Stedanko", "Ralph and Herbie", "Let's Make a Dope Deal", "Earache My Eye", and the classic "Dave". It was released on March 18, 2013, by 20th Century Fox and was released on DVD/Blu-ray on April 23, 2013.

The trailer claims it to be an adventure, but scenes shown throughout are mostly animated interpretations of their segments from their comedy albums. It also features a wraparound story of a genital crab named Buster the Body Crab trying to get high from Chong's weed scented head.

== Plot ==
The movie opens with an interview with a crab louse named Buster living on a bikini-clad woman. The body crab sees Man (Tommy Chong) passing by and jumps on his beard. Man quickly pulls him out and throws him away. Pedro De Pacas (Cheech Marin) is shown driving just up the street from the hitchhiking Man. Pedro sees him and stops the car to give Man a ride. Man gets in and they both peel off, sending the body crab flying. The body crab smells the strong marijuana scent left behind from their car and gives chase. Pedro and Man smoke a joint together and drive through traffic as Pedro admires the street lights. A police car suddenly appears from behind and tails them. Man quickly decides to eat all the drugs in the car to avoid being caught with them. After Man does that the police car passes them without pulling them over. The body crab then gets hit by a train while it is still looking for them.

Pedro and Man pull into a theater. They go in and try to find a parking spot. They pull into a spot near theatre speakers and hear knocking from inside their trunk. They then have to park somewhere else so they won't be spotted letting whoever is in the trunk out. Unfortunately, the key breaks off in the lock so Man has to search for a crow bar but he's unsuccessful. Pedro gets out of the car and urinates on the trunk and a camera cut reveals there are two people in the trunk and are afraid of being peed on. The credits start to roll on the movie theater movie and the movie theater speaker announces the movie has ended. Just then Man returns with a load of snacks. Pedro and Man leave the theater.

The next day, a skit with two dogs then takes place. The body crab appears in one of the dogs excrement and is stepped on by Pedro, who winds up taking the body crab home on the bottom of his shoe. He wipes his shoes on the doormat and goes inside and watches television with Man. An interrogation scene from a film plays on the TV. They change the channel and a gameshow involving drugs plays. The gameshow eventually leads into a zit treatment product commercial. Next, a spoof of American Bandstand plays on the television. They then turn off the TV and Pedro pulls out a giant rolled joint that is filled with a sock. They try to smoke it but it just makes them cough. The body crab appears at the window but is soon snatched by a bird and released further away from the house. The body crab lands on the window of a doctor who is examining patients.

A skit involving a Jewish man and his child talking to their doctor starts. The doctor tries to remove a bullet from the child's nose and the bullet explodes, sending the body crab flying. The camera then zooms into a product called Acapulco Gold (which are marijuana joints). Filming of a commercial for this product takes place.

The film cuts back to Pedro in his home and someone knocks at his door claiming to be the police. Pedro then rushes to get rid of all his drugs. After he gets rid of the drugs he answers the door only to be greeted by Man who says "April Fools".

The film then shows a paper article about Afghanistan and a skit taking place there plays out. The body crab then appears on someones shoulder in Afghanistan but is shot. The camera then zooms into a courtroom skit. Soon Man is shown to be on trial. Man wanders around the courtroom and then returns to his table to gather up drugs which were to be used as evidence against him. Man begins to ramble much to the chagrin of his lawyer. Man approaches the judge's desk, climbs on it then passes out. The scene dissolves into Man passed out on the floor in his house. It appears that it was actually a dream. Pedro knocks on the door, waking him up. The "Dave's not here" skit then begins to play out. Pedro is trying to get in but Man refuses to open the door. Pedro gives up and begins to cry. The body crab then appears underneath a deck board but is roasted as he turns into a vampire and is exposed to natural sunlight. Man, still inside, starts to watch a show called "Wake up America". The Wake Up America skit involves a reporter who is a parody of Geraldo Rivera investigating the recording industry. After the reporter is ejected from the studio Pedro is seen walking by. The body crab catches his scent and tries to dive on him from a window sill but lands on an electric wire instead.

Man is shown on the phone at a diner making a drug deal. After that call ends, Pedro makes a few song requests on the phone with a local radio station. Man leaves and a cop approaches Pedro as he is trying to listen to the radio. He finds Man's drugs but since Pedro is the only one around at that time he is arrested instead. He takes Pedro outside and the camera zooms across the street to Sister Mary Elephant's school. Another skit involving a nun teaching a class takes place. Shortly after, Sargent Stadanko then joins Sister Mary Elephant's class to speak out against drug use. Just as Sargent Stadanko is about to leave Pedro opens the door to the class. Pedro and Man then play Earache My Eye. The body crab appears during the song and starts to head-bang. It runs after them but falls into a jar of chemicals. Pedro and Man are then seen lifted into a rocket and they launch into outer space. The body crab is seen to have made it on the rocket and jumps in Man's beard. The rocket crashes into the moon and the moon proceeds to smoke it as its appearance is similar to a joint.

During the credits a scene shows the body crab singing and having a party on Man's beard. Man again plucks it and throws it away.

== Cast ==
- Cheech Marin - Jacque Culot, Pedro De Pacas, Herbie (Dog), Nazi, Show Host, Juan Mo'ty, Righton Washington, Empire Hancock Host, Mr. Stromberg, Jamie, Acapulco Gold Host, P.A., Captain, Soldier #1, Rodriguez, R.F.D. Soldier #1, Bailiff, Judge Gladys Dykes, Attorney, Horrendo Revolver, Sister Marry Elephant, Swifty, Lucy, Alice Bowie
- Tommy Chong - Buster "The Body Crab", Man, Ticket Guy, Ralph (Dog), Screaming Woman, Bob Bitchin, Laidback Lenny, Blind Melon Chitlin, Doctor, Ashley Roachclip, Com Soldier, Brown, R.F.D. Soldier #1, Leslie Horwinkle, Stoner, Security Guard, Guy In Bathroom, Nemo Track's, Narc, Radio Host, Billy, Horseface, Chongo, Sgt. Stadanko, Captain Quaalude

== Soundtrack ==
The soundtrack for the film was released on April 9, 2013.

== Releases ==
The movie debuted in theaters on March 18, 2013, by 20th Century Fox. The DVD and Blu-ray release by 20th Century Fox Home Entertainment followed shortly after on April 23, 2013.

== Reception ==
High Def Digest wrote that "The filmmakers' attempts to connect the sketches are so thin and poorly conceived that I'm a little confused as to why they bothered at all" and "The visual embellishments rarely add much to the humor [...] these additions actually end up diminishing a lot of the legitimate comedy found in the duo's vocal performances [and] the movie only proves how much more effective these sketches are when the audience is only focused on the audio, letting their own imaginations fill in the blanks themselves." Merry Jane advised viewers, "Don't puff, just pass."
