= Up in Smoke =

1978 Cheech & Chong film directed by Lou Adler

- Theatrical release poster
- Directed by: Lou Adler
- Written by: Tommy Chong; Cheech Marin
- Produced by: Lou Adler; Lou Lombardo
- Starring: Cheech Marin; Tommy Chong; Tom Skerritt; Edie Adams; Strother Martin; Stacy Keach
- Cinematography: Gene Polito
- Edited by: Scott Conrad
- Music by: Danny Kortchmar; Waddy Wachtel
- Production company: Paramount Pictures
- Distributed by: Paramount Pictures
- Release date: September 15, 1978 (United States)
- Running time: 86 minutes
- Country: United States
- Language: English
- Budget: $2 million
- Box office: $104 million

Up in Smoke (also referred to as Cheech & Chong's Up in Smoke) is a 1978 American buddy stoner comedy film directed by Lou Adler in his directorial debut and starring Cheech Marin, Tommy Chong, Tom Skerritt, Edie Adams, Strother Martin, and Stacy Keach. It is Cheech & Chong's film debut.

Cheech & Chong had been a counterculture comedy team for about ten years before they started reworking some of their material for their first film. Most of the film was shot in Los Angeles, California, including scenes set in Tijuana, while scenes set on the Mexican border were actually filmed at the border in Yuma, Arizona.

While negatively received upon its release, Up in Smoke grossed over $104 million, is credited with establishing the stoner film genre, and is now considered a cult classic. In 2024, the film was selected for preservation in the United States National Film Registry by the Library of Congress as being "culturally, historically, or aesthetically significant".

== Plot ==
Anthony "Man" Stoner, an unemployed, marijuana-smoking drummer, is told to either get a job by sundown or be sent off to military school by his parents. Man leaves the house and later becomes stranded on the highway. Man is picked up while hitchhiking by the equally enthusiastic stoner Pedro de Pacas, and the two share a large joint, which is revealed to contain Labrador feces after the dog ate Man's supply. When Pedro freaks out and seems to have trouble breathing, Man accidentally gives him an extremely powerful dose of LSD. The police find their car parked on a traffic median with them in it, discover that they are high, and arrest them. At trial, the pair are released on a technicality after Man discovers that the judge is drinking vodka.

In an attempt to procure more marijuana, they visit Pedro's cousin Strawberry, a Vietnam War veteran with PTSD. During the party, a lady snorts a couple of lines of Ajax set up by Man, under the presumption it was cocaine, despite Man trying to warn her. They narrowly escape a police raid on Strawberry's house while Strawberry has a flashback and thinks the police are the Viet Cong but are soon deported to Tijuana by the INS along with Pedro's relatives, who actually called the INS on themselves so they could get a free ride to a wedding in Tijuana.

In order to get back to the United States, they arrange to pick up a vehicle from Pedro's uncle's upholstery shop but arrive at the wrong address: a marijuana processing plant disguised as an upholstery shop. They end up unknowingly involved in a plot to smuggle a van constructed completely out of "fiberweed" (hardened THC resin derived from marijuana – a play on the word fiberglass) from Mexico to Los Angeles, with an inept police narcotics unit led by the insane and anti-drug Sergeant Stedenko hot on their trail. At the Mexican–American border, they almost get arrested, but attention is diverted to a group of nuns (into whose car Man had thrown his joint unintentionally to avoid getting arrested). The duo then cross the border into America as Stedenko finds out from his unit that they have apprehended the wrong group. Stedenko realizes that Pedro and Man's van is their target and begins a pursuit; however, one of Stedenko's men shoots out one of their own tires due to incompetence, abruptly ending the chase.

Pedro and Man pick up two hitchhiking women who convince them to perform at a Battle of the Bands contest at the Roxy Theatre. After narrowly avoiding arrest by a motorcycle cop who had gotten high off fumes from the "fiberweed" van, they arrive at the venue to find that most of the bands performing are being negatively received by the audience, which causes Man to freak out. One of the women gives Man what she believes is an "upper", but mistakenly gives him the wrong drugs and leaves Man feeling weak. The duo's band, Alice Bowie, wins over the audience, including the cops, who get stoned due to a large amount of marijuana smoke from the burning van being funneled into the venue. The pair wins the contest and a recording contract. Outside, a defeated Stedenko is upset at the fact that he and his unit are stoned and gives in to the munchies.

The film concludes with Pedro and Man driving in the former's car and dreaming how their future career will pay off. Man then lights a small portion of hash and gives some to Pedro. However, it falls into his lap, causing him to panic and swerve the car while trying to put it out; Man attempts to put the hash out with his beer. During the scuffle, the car swerves down the road, and smoke billows out the windows.

== Cast ==
- Cheech Marin as Pedro De Pacas
- Tommy Chong as Anthony "Man" Stoner (Note: Chong's character name is used only once. It is during the scene in which his father berates him, and his mother calls him "Anthony".)
- Strother Martin as Arnold Stoner
- Edie Adams as Tempest Stoner
- Stacy Keach as Sergeant Stedenko
- Mills Watson as Harry
- Zane Buzby as Jade East
- Wally Ann Wharton as Debbie (as Anne Wharton, born Anne Marie Wharton)
- Tom Skerritt as Strawberry
- June Fairchild as Ajax Lady
- Rainbeaux Smith as Laughing Lady
- Angelina Estrada as Aunt Bolita
- Otto Felix as Motorcycle Cop
- Louisa Moritz as Officer Gloria Whitey
- David Nelson and Kurt Kaufman as Roxy Theatre Doormen
- Rodney Bingenheimer as Himself
- Ellen Barkin (Uncredited) as Guitar-Playing Woman
- Harry Dean Stanton (Deleted Scenes) as Police Officer
- Gary Mule Deer as The Freak With The Basketball
- Corey Fortenberry (uncredited) Little Girl On The Couch
- Ruth Hernandez (uncredited) Court Reporter

== Production ==
The screenplay was written under the title The Adventures of Pedro & Man. Paramount Pictures provided the budget of $1 million but refused to provide the additional $800,000 needed to complete the film after studio president Michael Eisner saw a rough cut, so Lou Adler used his own money to complete it.

== Release ==
As this was the comedy duo's first film, Paramount wanted the initial screenings to be filled with their most ardent fans. Cheech and Chong also came up with the novel (and ultimately successful) idea of advertising the film through comic strips, which they left on bus benches.

The film had test screenings in August 1978 and opened in nine theatres in Texas in early September, grossing $344,785 in its first 10 days. The film went on to become a huge success. Prior to its official release date, the film had grossed $1.7 million, and by the end of the first month of release, it had grossed $20 million and went on to gross $76 million at the domestic box office and over $104 million worldwide.

The film had midnight screenings at the Cannes Film Festival on May 17 and 18, 1979.

The film was banned in South Africa during apartheid. Censors in the country said that the film "might encourage the impressionable youth of South Africa to take up marijuana smoking". It was also banned in Colombia.

=== Home media ===
On April 10, 2018, a 40th Anniversary Edition set was released, which featured the movie on Blu-ray and DVD and the album on vinyl record and compact disc, as well as a 7-inch picture disc vinyl record single featuring the songs "Earache My Eye" and "Lost Due To Incompetence (Theme From A Big Green Van)", with an image of Cheech from the film on the A-side and the "YESCA" license plate image on the B-side.

The 40th Anniversary Edition CD featured two bonus tracks, a previously unreleased version of the song "Up In Smoke" with an additional Spanish verse by Cheech, and a newly recorded "2018 version" of the same song.

The set also featured oversized Up In Smoke branded rolling papers, an 11×17 film poster and a booklet with new essays by both Marin and Chong, along with rare and unseen photos.

== Soundtrack album ==
Up in Smoke

Soundtrack album by Cheech & Chong
- Released: 1978
- Length: 40:05
- Label: Warner Bros./Ode
- Producer: Lou Adler

Cheech & Chong chronology
Sleeping Beauty (1976)	Up in Smoke (1978)	Let's Make a New Dope Deal (1980)

Singles from Up in Smoke
- 1. "Up in Smoke/Rock Fight" Released: 1978

Professional ratings
Review scores
Source	Rating
Allmusic	3/5 stars

The soundtrack album was released in 1978. Allmusic gave the album a score of 3 out of 5 stars. In 2017, Billboard named Up in Smoke as one of the 10 best stoner film soundtracks.

=== Track listing ===
Side A
No.	Title	Lyrics	Music	Performer(s)	Length
1.	"Finkelstein Shit Kid" (dialogue)			Strother Martin	0:14
2.	"Up in Smoke"	Cheech & Chong	Tommy Chong	Cheech & Chong	2:24
3.	"Low Rider" (first appeared on the 1975 album Why Can't We Be Friends?)	War; Jerry Goldstein	War	War	3:13
4.	"1st Gear, 2nd Gear" (dialogue)			Cheech & Chong	7:20
5.	"Framed" (first appeared on the 1976 album Sleeping Beauty)	Cheech & Chong	Jerry Leiber; Mike Stoller	Cheech & Chong	2:44
6.	"Searchin'"	Cheech & Chong	Jerry Leiber; Mike Stoller	Cheech & Chong	2:44
7.	"The Ajax Lady" (dialogue)			Thomas Chong; June Fairchild	0:54
8.	"Strawberry's"		Danny Kortchmar; Waddy Wachtel	Yesca	3:28

Side B
No.	Title	Lyrics	Music	Performer(s)	Length
9.	"Here Come the Mounties to the Rescue"		Danny Kortchmar; Waddy Wachtel	Yesca	2:58
10.	"Sometimes When You Gotta Go, You Can't" (dialogue)			Cheech Marin; Stacy Keach	1:04
11.	"Lost Due to Incompetence" (Theme for a Big Green Van)		Danny Kortchmar; Waddy Wachtel	Yesca	3:45
12.	"Lard Ass" (dialogue)			Cheech & Chong; Stacy Keach; Karl Johnson	1:27
13.	"Rock Fight"	Cheech & Chong	Cheech & Chong	Cheech & Chong	3:13
14.	"I Didn't Know Your Name Was Alex" (dialogue)			Cheech & Chong; Zane Buzby	1:26
15.	"Earache My Eye" (first appeared on the 1974 album Cheech & Chong's Wedding Album)	Cheech & Chong	Cheech & Chong; Gaye Delorme	Alice Bowie	2:38
16.	"Up in Smoke" (reprise)	Cheech & Chong	Tommy Chong	Cheech & Chong	0:56

40th Anniversary Edition CD bonus tracks
No.	Title	Performer(s)	Length
17.	"Up in Smoke" (Spanish verse)	Cheech & Chong	3:26
18.	"Up in Smoke 2018"	Cheech & Chong	3:57

40th Anniversary Edition bonus 7" picture disc single
No.	Title	Performer(s)	Length
1.	"Earache My Eye" (Side A)	Alice Bowie	2:38
2.	"Lost Due To Incompetence (Theme From A Big Green Van)" (Side B)	Yesca	3:45

=== Charts ===
Chart (1979)	Peak position
Australian (Kent Music Report)	80

=== Personnel ===
- Lou Adler - Producer
- Waddy Wachtel - Producer (8, 9, 11, 13)
- Danny Kortchmar - Producer (8, 9, 11, 13)
- Jerry Leiber - Producer (5, 6)
- Mike Stoller - Producer (5, 6)
- Jerry Goldstein - Producer (3)
- Steve Katz - Engineer
- Howard Frank - Assistant Engineer

Yesca

- Waddy Wachtel - Guitar
- Danny Kortchmar - Guitar
- Jai Winding - Keyboards
- Stanley Sheldon - Bass
- Rick Marotta - Drums

"Up in Smoke 2018"

- Bass – Cisco Adler
- Engineer, Mixed By, Mastered By – Johannes Raassina
- Guitar – Duane Betts, Jeramy "Bearbo" Gritter
- Piano, Organ, Drums – Cody Dickerson
- Producer – Cisco Adler, Lou Adler

== Reception ==
On Rotten Tomatoes, the film has an approval rating of 45%, based on reviews from 20 critics. The site's consensus reads, "Oft-quoted but undeniably flawed, Up In Smoke is a seminal piece of stoner cinema thanks to the likability of its two counterculture icons." On Metacritic, it has a score of 57 out of 100, based on reviews from 11 critics, indicating "mixed or average" reviews.

Vincent Canby of The New York Times called the film "a genially slapdash, sometimes winning live-action cartoon" with "several genuinely funny moments." Variety wrote that the film "gets off to a great start" but "once the more obvious drug jokes are exhausted, Adler lets the film degenerate into a mixture of fitful slapstick and toilet humor." Gene Siskel of the Chicago Tribune gave the film half of one star out of four, calling it "one of the most juvenile, poorly written, awkwardly directed pictures I have ever seen. And my guess is that even if you saw it in a pleasantly altered state whether from grass, a banana daiquiri, Frango mint milkshake, or a Weight Watchers' Veal Parmigiana frozen dinner, Up in Smoke would still be a real downer, man." He later put it on his year-end unranked list of the worst films of 1978. Kevin Thomas of the Los Angeles Times wrote that Cheech & Chong were "a likable, funky duo, but the script they've come up with for their film debut is severely underwritten." He also found it "hard to watch the effects of gulping Quaaludes and the like being treated as something hilarious—especially when one realizes that the kids for whom the film was so clearly intended are probably going to love it."

Pauline Kael of The New Yorker compared the film favorably to The Groove Tube, writing that Up in Smoke was "also crudely done but is more consistently funny." She added that "Cheech and Chong are so gracefully dumb-assed that if you're in a relaxed mood you can't help laughing at them." Art Harris of The Washington Post wrote that the film "may give you a buzz, but don't count on it to keep you high. Like, you know, the film suffers from a bad case of burn-out, leading one to nod off between jokes and wonder why producer Lou Adler bothered to attempt a Doper's Delight in this post-Woodstock age of Clean Living." David McGillivray of The Monthly Film Bulletin observed that the film "looks, unfortunately, as if it were more fun to make than it is to watch."

== Unproduced follow-ups ==
In December 1978, Rolling Stone published an article stating that Cheech and Chong had "seven scripts waiting in the drawer" which included one for an animated film, and one for a sequel to Up in Smoke. No sequel was ever produced, and Cheech and Chong's Next Movie, released in 1980, did not feature the characters of Pedro and Man, although the characters they played had personalities and character traits that were virtually identical to those of Pedro and Man.

== Legacy ==
The Grammy Award Museum in Los Angeles features an Up in Smoke exhibit which displays the master tape for the soundtrack album, the annotated original script, limited-edition 40th anniversary "smoking devices," and part of Marin's collection of "Blazing Chicano Guitars."

The officially licensed graphic novel Cheech & Chong's Chronicles: A Brief History of Weed was released by Z2 Comics in 2021. Written by Cheech Marin, Tommy Chong, and Eliot Rahal, the graphic novel acts as a sequel to the Up in Smoke film, as it features Pedro de Pacas and Anthony "Man" Stoner as the main characters of the story.

== See also ==
- List of cult films
