= Tommy Chong =

Canadian comedian and actor (born 1938)

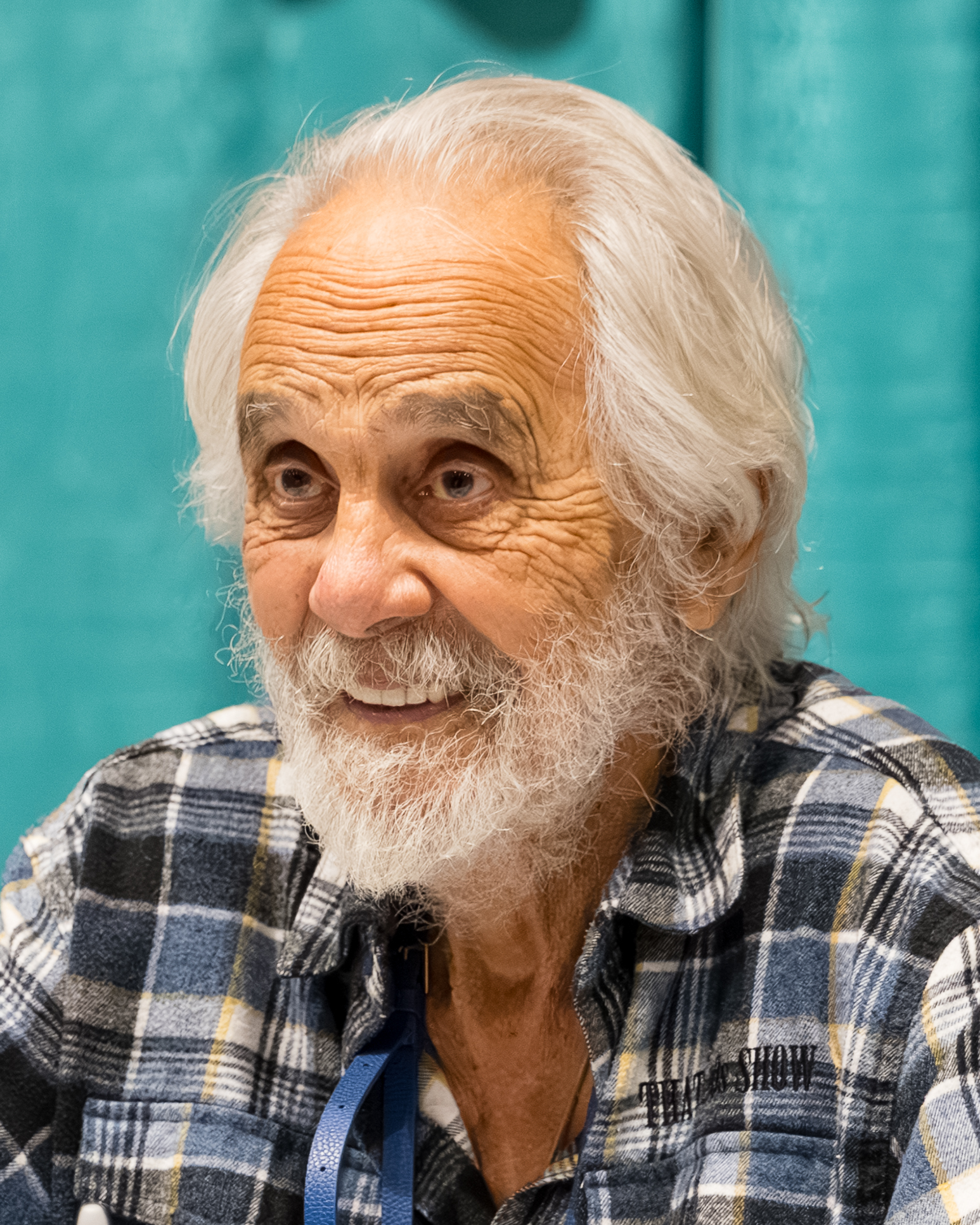
- Chong at GalaxyCon Oklahoma City in 2026
- Born: Thomas Bing Kin Chong; May 24, 1938 (age 88); Edmonton, Alberta, Canada
- Spouses: Maxine Sneed (m. 1960; div. 1970); Shelby Fiddis (m. 1975)
- Children: 6, including Rae, Robbi and Marcus
- Relatives: C. Thomas Howell (former son-in-law)

Comedy career
- Years active: 1962–present
- Medium: Film; stand-up; television
- Genres: Character comedy; political satire; stoner comedy; sketch comedy
- Subjects: Canadian culture; drug culture; everyday life; recreational drug use
- Chong's voice On Cheech & Chong

Thomas Bing Kin Chong (born May 24, 1938) is a Canadian comedian, actor, musician and activist. He is known for his role/inspiration in the marijuana industry, his marijuana-themed Cheech & Chong comedy albums and movies with Cheech Marin, and playing the character Leo on Fox's That '70s Show. He became a naturalized United States citizen in the late 1980s.

== Early life ==
Thomas Bing Kin Chong was born on May 24, 1938, in Edmonton, Alberta to Stanley Chong Sr. and Lorna Jean Gilchrist. His mother was a Canadian of Scottish and Irish ancestry, while his father was a Canadian of Chinese descent and was born in Vancouver, British Columbia in 1908. Chong first lived with an aunt in Vancouver. He had an older brother, Stan (1936–2018).

As a youth, Tommy Chong moved with his family to Calgary, settling in a conservative neighbourhood Chong has referred to as "Dog Patch". He has said that his father had "been wounded in World War II and there was a veterans' hospital in Calgary. He bought a $500 house in Dog Patch and raised his family on $50 a week." In an interview, Chong later described how he dropped out of Crescent Heights High School "when I was 16 but probably just before they were going to throw me out anyway." He played guitar to make money. In 1993, he also said of his youth, "I discovered that music could get me laid, even if you were a scrawny, long-haired, geeky-looking guy like me."

== Career ==
=== Music ===
By the early 1960s, Chong was playing guitar for a Calgary soul group called the Shades. The Shades moved to Vancouver, where the band's name changed to "Little Daddy & the Bachelors". They recorded a single, "Too Much Monkey Business" / "Junior's Jerk". Together with bandmember Bobby Taylor, Chong opened a Vancouver nightclub in 1963. Formerly the Alma Theatre, they called it the “Blues Palace”. They brought in the Ike & Tina Turner Revue, which had never been to Vancouver before. Although Little Daddy & the Bachelors built up a small following, things soured when they went with Chong's suggestion and had themselves billed as "Four Niggers and a Chink" (or, bowing to pressure, "Four N's and a C") before taking on the moniker Bobby Taylor & the Vancouvers.

In 1965, the Vancouvers signed with Gordy Records (a subsidiary of Detroit's Motown Records). They recorded their debut album, an eponymous release, and their debut single, the Tommy Chong co-composition, "Does Your Mama Know About Me," peaked at number 29 on the Billboard Hot 100. While on tour in Chicago for a short time, the band followed opening act the Jackson 5. Chong later referred to the young Michael Jackson as a "cute little guy". After the band released two additional singles, Chong and bandmate Wes Henderson missed a Friday night performance to apply for green cards so they could become American citizens. Chong was fired by Chris Clark and Motown producer Johnny Bristol for arriving late to the gig. Later, when Berry Gordy told Chong that he wasn't fired after all, that it had been a mistake, Chong said he wanted to stay fired. "I said I want to become a Berry Gordy, I don't want to just work for a Berry Gordy. And he says I can, I can dig that. So he was nice. He gave me $5,000 as the severance and to me that was a fortune." The group broke up shortly afterwards, when Chong tried to reduce the number of players covered by the Vancouvers' contract. He intended that he, Taylor, and Henderson would constitute the group, while other members would be classified as sidemen and session artists.

Chong opened another nightclub in Vancouver's Chinatown in 1966 with his brother Stan called the Shanghai Junk Cabaret. The club defied local stripping laws that necessitated that strippers wear pasties, which led to the club having their liquor license revoked in 1967. Chong often performed as part of Bobby Taylor and the Vancouvers while dancers performed in the club.

=== Cheech & Chong ===
Chong co-wrote and performed on many Cheech & Chong comedy albums, four of which were nominated for the Grammy Award for Best Comedy Album. He and Cheech Marin shared the 1973 award in this category for Los Cochinos.

He also directed four of the duo's films, while co-writing and starring in all seven with Cheech.

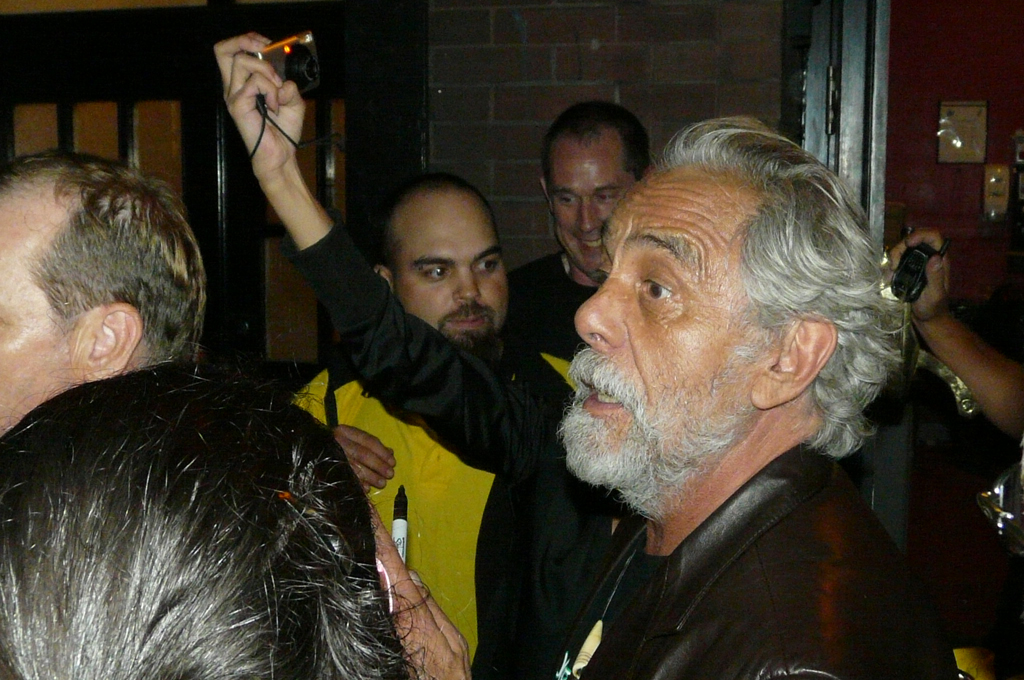
Tommy Chong in Toronto, 2008

Chong appeared with his long-time comedy partner, Cheech Marin, in a 2000 South Park episode called "Cherokee Hair Tampons".

In mid-2008, Cheech & Chong reunited and started touring. The tour was called Light Up America and Canada and The Felimony Tour, which referred to major experiences of each. In October 2008, they appeared on The Howard Stern Show, the Opie and Anthony Show, and the Ron and Fez Show on SIRIUS/XM Satellite Radio. On March 1, 2010, they hosted WWE Raw in Oklahoma City. On March 13, 2011, Cheech & Chong were guest stars on The Simpsons episode "A Midsummer's Nice Dream", where, during a reunion tour, Homer briefly replaced Chong before the pair reconciled.

Cheech Marin appeared in Tommy Chong's first dance in the season opener of Dancing with the Stars on September 15, 2014. Around this same time, Cheech and Chong appeared together on the Internet-based, pro-marijuana show, Getting Doug with High.

=== Solo career ===
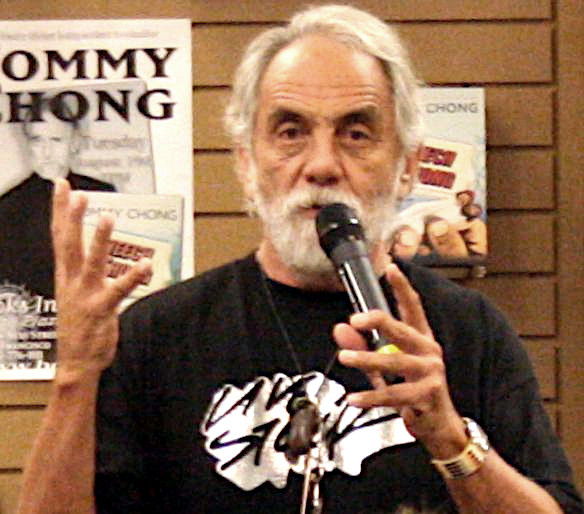
Chong speaking in San Francisco in 2008

In January of 1982, a nude beefcake of Chong was featured as the Playgirl centerfold. His photos were republished in that year's Best of Playgirl. He also appeared as the 1983 Playgirl calendar, for the month of March.

Cheech & Chong, while a very successful comedy act, split in 1985 due to creative differences and Marin's desire to focus on a mainstream acting career. This began a difficult time for Chong. He developed an unsold pilot for CBS called The Martinez Family, which was redeveloped as the 1988 sitcom Trial and Error. In 1990, he directed, wrote and starred in the movie Far Out Man. He did not act regularly until filling the recurring role (later a regular role) as the fun-loving, aging hippie "Leo" (similar to his Chong character) on That '70s Show. Chong was absent during the fifth and sixth seasons of the show as he was serving a brief jail sentence; upon his release, he returned to the series for its final two seasons. He also played a role as a hippie in Dharma & Greg.

Chong was originally going to voice the character of Shenzi, the hyena in the Disney film The Lion King. Cheech Marin voiced Banzai. (The Shenzi character was changed to a female and was voiced instead by Whoopi Goldberg.) Chong provided the voice of the character Yax in the 2016 Disney film Zootopia.

In September 2005, a/k/a Tommy Chong premiered at the Toronto International Film Festival. The documentary, produced, written and directed by Josh Gilbert, chronicles Chong's comedic and personal history. It includes material related to his prosecution by the US Justice Department and imprisonment. The project features interviews with Cheech Marin, Bill Maher, George Thorogood, Peter Coyote, Lou Adler, Eric Schlosser and Jay Leno. In 2011, Chong appeared as a Judge in an episode of Franklin & Bash.

On September 4, 2014, Chong was announced as one of the celebrities participating on the 19th season of Dancing with the Stars. He paired with professional dancer Peta Murgatroyd. Despite being at the bottom of the leaderboard numerous times, Chong and Murgatroyd were able to make it to the night of the semi-finals but were eliminated at the end of that night. Chong is the oldest contestant to have made it to the semi-finals of the show.

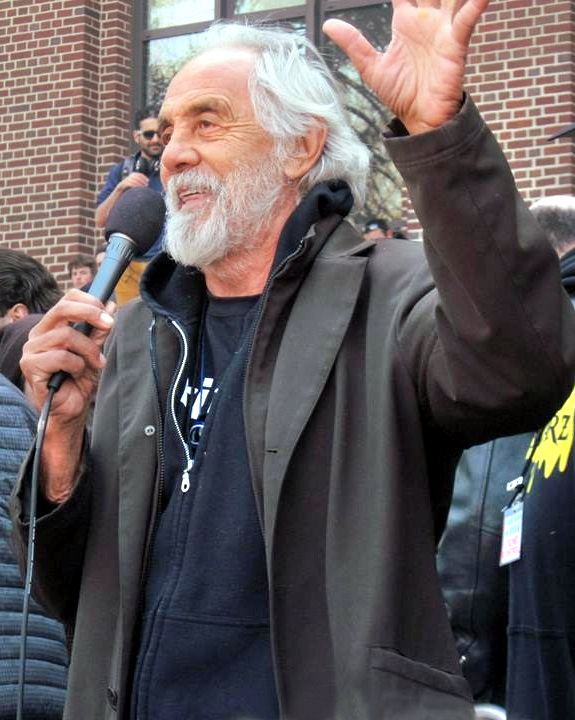
Chong at 2015 Hash Bash

On April 4, 2015, Chong appeared as a guest speaker at the annual "Hash Bash" event in Ann Arbor, Michigan, which focuses on cannabis legalization.

In November 2017, Chong guest-starred as himself in an episode of the Trailer Park Boys spinoff Out of the Park: USA. In 2017, he also partnered with smoking subscription box service Daily High Club to create the DHC Tommy Chong Signature Smoking Supply Box.

On January 9, 2019, Chong competed in season one of The Masked Singer as "Pineapple" where he sang "I Will Survive" by Gloria Gaynor.

On May 23, 2019, Chong appeared on episode #1303 of the internet video podcast The Joe Rogan Experience, hosted by Joe Rogan.

On June 19, 2019, Chong appeared on episode #694 of the internet video podcast "The Church Of What's Happening Now", hosted by Joey Diaz.

In April 2020, Chong's brand started working alongside the fashion brand Slicks.

On December 18, 2020, Chong appeared in the online cannabis publication The Green Fund for an interview to discuss his career with Cheech & Chong and his upcoming branded dispensaries.

== Personal life ==
In 1960, Chong married Maxine Sneed, the older sister of drummer Floyd Sneed, in Canada. They raised two daughters, Rae Dawn (b. 1961) and Robbi Chong (b. 1965). They divorced in 1970.

In 1975, Chong married Shelby Fiddis in Los Angeles. They had three children, including the actor Precious Chong. They also adopted Marcus Wyatt (b. 1967) in 1978. Marcus took the surname of his adoptive parents and siblings when he turned eighteen.

In an interview, Tommy Chong shared that he smoked with Willie Nelson, Snoop Dogg, Arnold Schwarzenegger and his bodybuilding buddies, and with all the Beatles except Paul McCartney. He also calls George Harrison his favorite smoking friend.

Tommy Chong is a marijuana activist and supports legalizing the plant's use. He is a regular contributor to Cannabis Culture Magazine and sits on the NORML (National Organization for the Reform of Marijuana Laws) advisory board.

=== Cancer diagnosis ===
Chong announced on June 9, 2012, that he was battling prostate cancer. He described the cancer "as a slow stage one [that I've] had for a long time". He said that he had been drug free for about three years, during which time he began having prostate-related problems. On June 16, 2015, he said he had been diagnosed with colorectal cancer and was "using cannabis like crazy" to endure the treatment.

In 2019, Chong announced that he is "cancer-free". He also opined that stress could have been a cause of his condition.

== Legal issues ==
=== U.S. v. Chong ===
In 2003, Chong became caught up in two American investigations, code-named Operation Pipe Dreams and Operation Headhunter, which tried to trace drug traffic and users through businesses selling drug paraphernalia, mostly bongs. Operation Pipe Dreams was based in Pittsburgh. U.S. Attorney for Western Pennsylvania Mary Beth Buchanan oversaw the case. The estimated cost of Operation Pipe Dreams was over $12 million and included the resources of 2,000 law enforcement officers. Fifty-five companies that sold drug paraphernalia over the Internet were the subject of the investigation, with Nice Dreams being one.

Chong was charged for his part in financing and promoting Chong Glass/Nice Dreams, a company started by his son Paris. His case never went to trial, as his attorney negotiated a plea agreement with the U.S. Attorney for the Western District of Pennsylvania's Office. He admitted to distributing 7,500 bongs and water pipes on the Internet through Nice Dreams. Chong agreed to plead guilty to one count of conspiracy to distribute drug paraphernalia in exchange for non-prosecution of his wife, Shelby, and his son, Paris. Chong cooperated with the government and was the first of the Operation Pipe Dreams defendants to plead guilty.

At Chong's sentencing, Assistant U.S. Attorney for Western Pennsylvania Mary McKeen Houghton said in her arguments that Tommy Chong "used his public image to promote this crime" and marketed his products to children. U.S. Attorney Mary Beth Buchanan also was present at the sentencing in Pittsburgh and released a statement to the press stating: "There are consequences for violating the law, even if the violator is a well-known entertainer like Thomas Chong."

While Chong argued for community service and home detention at his sentencing, the district judge, Arthur J. Schwab, denied his requests and sentenced him to 9 months in federal prison, a fine of $20,000, forfeiture of $103,514, and the loss of all merchandise seized during the raid of his business. Chong served his sentence at the Taft Correctional Institution from October 8, 2003, to July 7, 2004. He was a cellmate of "The Wolf of Wall Street" Jordan Belfort, who credits him for encouraging Belfort to write his memoirs. They have remained friends.

These events were among those chronicled in a/k/a Tommy Chong (2006), a documentary by Josh Gilbert. It premiered theatrically at the New York Film Forum in New York City and won awards. His time in prison was also a main point in his book, "The I Chong".

=== Controversy ===
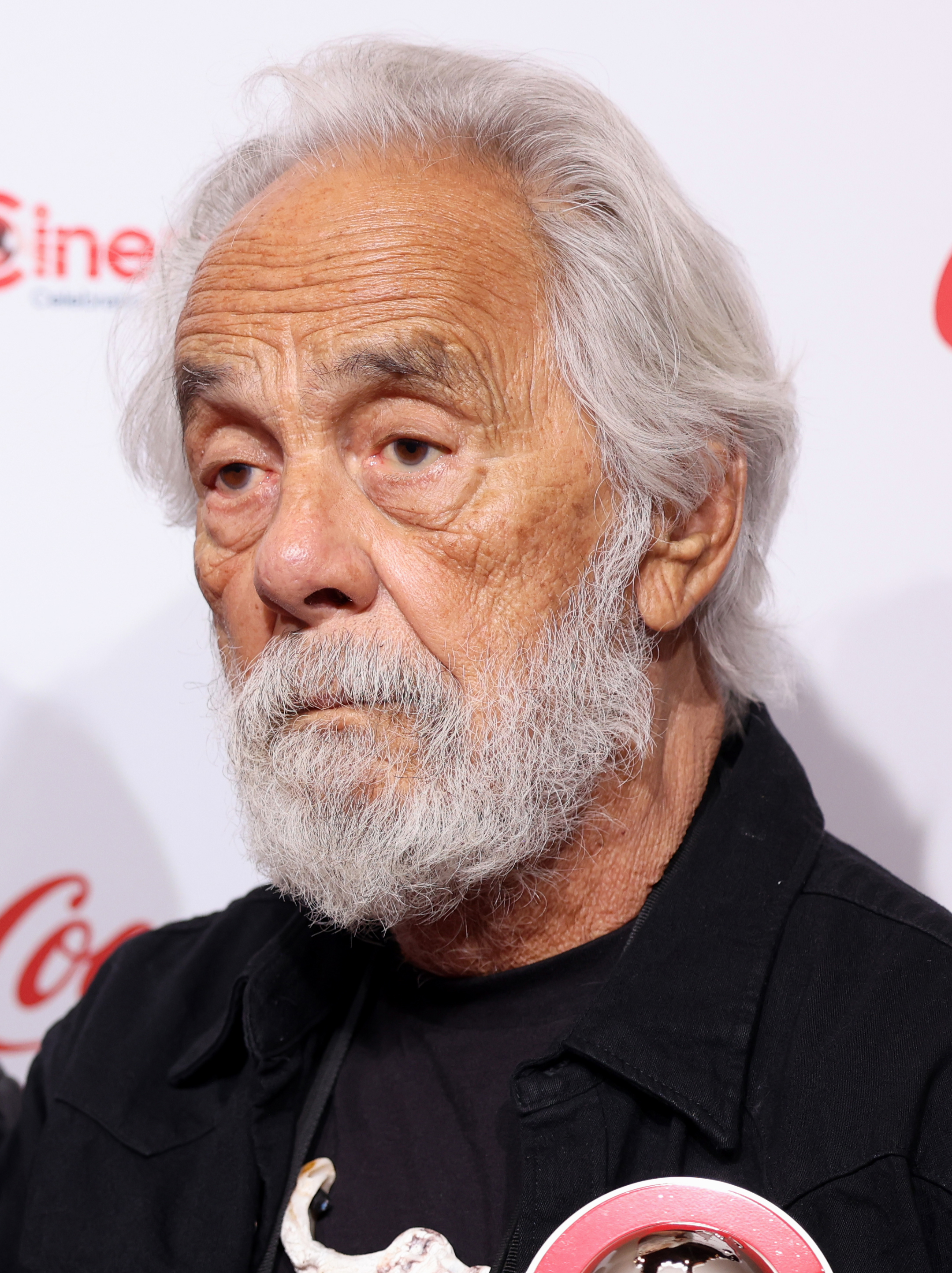
Tommy Chong at the 2025 CinemaCon in Las Vegas, Nevada

While government officials denied that Chong was treated any differently from the other defendants, supporters felt his celebrity status was being used against him. Chong's publicist Brandie Knight said the Chong family was shocked by the raid. "We've done everything the right way, and the government is saying there is no right way," Knight said. Supporters started the "Free Tommy Chong!" movement that called for his release. They questioned why Chong was prosecuted rather than his son Paris Chong, who was CEO of the business. They also pointed to the disparity in sentences between Chong's and those of other defendants, and they protested the DEA tactics used in the investigation.

Paris Chong had started Nice Dreams in 1999. He was never charged with his alleged crimes in relation to the investigation, as part of a plea bargain. When asked why the government had focused on Chong rather than his son the CEO, U.S. Attorney Mary Beth Buchanan said that "Tommy Chong was the more responsible corporate officer because he financed and marketed the product."

Of the 55 people who were subjects of the investigation, Chong was the only one without previous convictions who received jail time. When questioned on the sentencing, U.S. Attorney Mary Beth Buchanan noted that Chong had never gone to trial and made a plea bargain. She said, "He was a relatively new player, but he had the ability to market products like no other."

During its investigation of Nice Dreams, federal agents posed as head-shop owners from Beaver County in western Pennsylvania. They asked Paris Chong to sell them pipes through the mail to a fictitious shop in the town of Beaver Falls, 31 miles (50 km) from Pittsburgh. Paris Chong had been prohibited from selling to Pittsburgh or anywhere in Western Pennsylvania because of the successful federal prosecution of Akhil Kumar Mishra and his wife, Rajeshwari, who had two head shops in the city. Accounts differ as to who in Nice Dreams went against Chong's prohibition, or even if it had been made up by the defense, but the sales did take place to the agents. This enabled the U.S. Attorney to show jurisdiction in Pennsylvania for Chong's illegal activities, as opposed to California, which was the base for Nice Dreams.

=== Aftermath ===
In December 2004, Chong was to appear in an off-Broadway show entitled The Marijuana-Logues, a parody of Eve Ensler's The Vagina Monologues. His parole officer barred him from the show and the tour was cancelled, as audience members were smoking pot during performances. Such exposure would cause Chong to violate the terms of his parole. In 2006, Chong published a memoir about his experiences in jail and his exploration of meditation, called The I Chong: Meditations from the Joint.

In 2010, Chong and Cyril Wecht appeared at a Democratic Party fundraiser in Pittsburgh, Pennsylvania, to aid the campaign against Mary Beth Buchanan, the United States Attorney who prosecuted him. She was running as a Republican candidate for the United States House of Representatives. She was defeated in the Republican primary.

=== Seizure of a/k/a Tommy Chong DVDs ===
On May 7, 2008, federal agents raided Spectrum Labs in an investigation related to its "detoxification" products. The search was one of nine conducted for Operation True Test, an investigation being led by Buchanan, still the U.S. Attorney for the Western District of Pennsylvania. It targeted companies that sold so-called "masking products," intended to help drug users pass employer drug tests. No federal law bans such products; they are regulated on a state-by-state basis. Of the nine search warrants issued, none was for businesses within Buchanan's district.

Chong claimed that federal agents had seized 8,000–10,000 copies of the yet-to-be released documentary, a/k/a Tommy Chong, from Spectrum Labs, but their attorney said no DVDs were taken. In a press release, Chong said: "[The seizure of the DVDs is] a way to punish the distributor financially. There's no way to get the DVDs back until the investigation is over." Chong said he did not have any ownership of the film. The Pittsburgh Post-Gazette later amended its story, saying that an "undisclosed number of DVDs was taken". It noted the government is not required to disclose a reason for the seizure as the raid was part of "an ongoing investigation".

== Filmography ==
=== Film ===
Year	Title	Role	Notes
1978	Up in Smoke	Anthony "Man" Stoner	Also writer and director
1980	Cheech & Chong's Next Movie	Chong	Also writer and director
1981	Nice Dreams	Chong	Also writer and director
1982	It Came from Hollywood	Himself	Documentary
1982	Things Are Tough All Over	Chong / Prince Habib	Also writer
1983	Still Smokin	Chong	Also writer and director
1983	Yellowbeard	El Nebuloso	
1984	Cheech & Chong's The Corsican Brothers	Lucian Corsican	Also writer and director
1985	Get Out of My Room	The Man	
1985	After Hours	Pepe	
1989	Tripwire	Merle Shine	
1990	Far Out Man	Far Out Man	Also writer and director
1992	Life After Sex	Awkward Naked Guy	
1992	FernGully: The Last Rainforest	Root	Voice role
1995	National Lampoon's Senior Trip	Red	
1997	McHale's Navy	Armando / Ernesto	
1998	Half Baked	Squirrel Master	
2001	The Wash	Dee's Connection	
2002	High Times' Potluck	Himself	
2003	Best Buds	Tommy Chong / Carlos	
2003	Pauly Shore Is Dead	Himself	
2005	Secret Agent 420	QP	
2006	Evil Bong	Jimbo Leary	
2006	a/k/a Tommy Chong	Himself	Documentary
2007	American Drug War: The Last White Hope	Himself	Documentary
2007	The Union: The Business Behind Getting High	Himself	Documentary
2008	I Am Somebody: No Chance in Hell	Deputy Tom	Original title: Chinaman's Chance
2010	Cheech & Chong's Hey Watch This	Himself	Documentary
2011	Hoodwinked Too! Hood vs. Evil	Stone	Voice role
2013	Cheech & Chong's Animated Movie	Various roles	Voice role; also writer
2014	The Fluffy Movie	Video store clerk	
2016	Zootopia	Yax	Voice role
2017	It's Gawd!	Gawd	
2018	Railroad to Hell: A Chinaman's Chance	Deputy Tom	
2019	Color Out of Space	Ezra	
2019	Jay and Silent Bob Reboot	Alfred	
2024	Cheech & Chong's Last Movie	Himself	Documentary
2025	Zootopia 2	Yax	Voice role

=== Television ===
Year	Title	Role	Notes
1986	Playboy Comedy Roast for Tommy Chong	Himself	
1986	Miami Vice	T.R. "Jumbo" Collins	Episode: "Trust Fund Pirates"
1994	The George Carlin Show	Rhodes	Episode: "George Runs Into an Old Friend"
1997	Nash Bridges	Barry Chen	Episode: "Wild Card"
1997	Sliders	Van Elsinger	Episode: "Stoker"
1999	Dharma & Greg	Carl	Episode: "Tie-Dying the Knot"
1999–2002, 2005–2006	That 70s Show	Leo Chingkwake	Season 2–4, 7 & 8
2000	South Park	Chief Running Pinto	Episode: "Cherokee Hair Tampons"
2007	George Lopez	Mr. Gutierez	Episode: "George Joins the Neighborhood Wha-tcha and Raises the Vigil-ante"
2008	Code Monkeys	Laird Boony	Episode: "The Secret of 4-20"
2009	MADtv	Himself	
2009	Tosh.0	Himself	Episode: "Drunk Dunk"
2010	WWE Raw	Himself	
2011	The Simpsons	Himself	Voice; episode: "A Midsummer's Nice Dream"
2011	Franklin and Bash	Judge Tommy Harper	Episode: "The Bangover"
2014	Raising Hope	Hubert Wilson	Episode: "The One Where They Get High"
2014	The Millers	Ganja Pete	Episode: "Bahama Mama"
2014	Dancing with the Stars	Himself	Contestant (season 19)
2015	Uncle Grandpa	Bottom Bag	Voice; episode: "Bottom Bag"
2017	Trailer Park Boys: Out Of the Park: USA	Anthony Stoner / Himself	Episode: "Los Angeles 1"
2019	The Masked Singer	Pineapple / Himself	Contestant (season 1)
2023–2024	That '90s Show	Leo Chingkwake	3 episodes
2024	Lopez vs Lopez	Bryan	Episode: "Let It Go"

=== Video games ===
Year	Title	Role	Notes
2024	Call of Duty: Modern Warfare III	Chong	Playable character in multiplayer modes

== Awards and nominations ==
Grammy Awards

Year	Nominee / work	Award	Result
1972	Cheech and Chong	Best Comedy Recording	Nominated
1973	Big Bambu	Best Comedy Recording	Nominated
1974	Los Cochinos	Best Comedy Recording	Won
1975	Cheech & Chong's Wedding Album	Best Comedy Recording	Nominated
1977	Sleeping Beauty	Best Comedy Recording	Nominated
1986	"Born in East L.A."	Best Comedy Recording	Nominated

Behind The Voice Actor Awards

Year	Nominee / work	Award	Result
2017	Zootopia	Best Vocal Ensemble in a Feature Film	Nominated

Golden Reel International Film Festival

Year	Nominee / work	Award	Result
2022	Chinaman's Chance: America's Other Slaves	Best Ensemble Cast	Won
