= David Ramirez (film editor) =

American film and television editor

- Born: United States
- Occupation: Film editor

David Ramirez is an American film and television editor. Ramirez is best known for such films and television series as American Pop, New York, New York, Star Trek: Deep Space Nine, and Still Smokin.

He was an associate film editor on The Blues Brothers, and assistant editor on Cabaret.
