= Let's Make a New Dope Deal =

Studio album by Cheech & Chong
- Released: 1980
- Genre: Comedy
- Length: 44:25
- Label: Warner Bros.
- Producer: Cheech & Chong

Cheech & Chong chronology
| Up in Smoke (1978) | Let's Make a New Dope Deal (1980) | Get Out of My Room (1985) |

Professional ratings
Review scores
| Source | Rating |
|---|---|
| AllMusic | 3/5 stars |

Let's Make a New Dope Deal is the sixth studio album by the comedy duo Cheech & Chong. Released in 1980 on LP, 8-track and cassette, the album was reissued on CD on November 15, 2005, along with Sleeping Beauty. It was their first project created without the involvement of Lou Adler or his company Ode.

A single for "Bloat On", a parody of "Float On" by R&B group The Floaters was released with a non-album B-side entitled "Just Say 'Right On'" with a picture sleeve depicting animated overweight versions of Cheech and Chong. The rest of the album may have been recorded shortly before filming began for Up In Smoke, with then-current references to Peter Frampton, punk rock, and Star Wars noticeable during some of the routines.

== Track listing ==
Side 1
| No. | Title | Length |
|---|---|---|
| 1. | "Queer Wars" | 4:21 |
| 2. | "Disco Disco" | 3:11 |
| 3. | "China Town" | 5:55 |
| 4. | "Rainbow Bar & Grill" | 2:40 |
| 5. | "Bloat On" | 5:00 |

Side 2
| No. | Title | Length |
|---|---|---|
| 1. | "Dork Radio" | 4:36 |
| 2. | "Let's Make a New Dope Deal" | 5:34 |
| 3. | "Acupuncture" | 5:03 |
| 4. | "Moe Money / Rudolph The Red-Nosed Reindeer" | 5:20 |
| 5. | "17th American Tour" | 3:02 |
