= Cheech Marin =

American comedian and actor (born 1946)

- Marin at GalaxyCon San Jose in 2026
- Born: Richard Anthony Marin; July 13, 1946 (age 80); Los Angeles, California, U.S.
- Education: California State University, Northridge (BA)
- Occupations: Comedian; actor; musician; activist
- Spouses: Darlene Morley (m. 1975; div. 1984) Patti Heid (m. 1986; div. 2009) Natasha Rubin (m. 2009)
- Children: 3

Comedy career
- Years active: 1971–present
- Medium: Film; stand-up; television
- Genres: Character comedy; musical comedy; political satire; sketch comedy; stoner comedy
- Subjects: Latin American culture; drug culture; everyday life; recreational drug use

Richard Anthony "Cheech" Marin (born July 13, 1946) is an American comedian and actor. He gained recognition as part of the comedy act Cheech & Chong during the 1970s and early 1980s with Tommy Chong, and as Don Johnson's partner, Insp. Joe Dominguez, on Nash Bridges. Marin has also voiced characters in several Disney films, including Oliver & Company, The Lion King, The Lion King 1½, the Cars franchise, Coco, and Beverly Hills Chihuahua.

Marin's trademark is his characters' strong Chicano accents.

== Early life ==
Marin was born on July 13, 1946, in South Los Angeles, California, to Mexican parents Elsa (née Meza; 1923–2010), a secretary, and Oscar Marin (1922–2015), a police officer for the LAPD and US Navy veteran of World War II. Marin was born with a cleft lip, which was surgically repaired. He identifies as Chicano; he speaks some Spanish and often uses it in his movies.

Marin's nickname "Cheech" is short for "chicharrón", fried pork rind, which is a popular snack and ingredient in Latin American cuisine. In a 2017 NPR interview, Marin attributed the nickname to his uncle: "I came home from the hospital, I was like a couple of days old or something, my uncle came over and he looked in the crib and he said [in Spanish], 'Ay, parece un chicharrón.' Looks like a little chicharrón, you know?"

While living in South Central, Marin attended Trinity Street Elementary School. In 1955, Marin and his family moved to Granada Hills, California, and he attended primary school at St. John Baptist de la Salle Catholic School. Marin then went to high school at Bishop Alemany High School, during which he started to attend folk music events at the Ash Grove on Melrose Avenue as a teenager. Marin then studied at California State University, Northridge (then known as San Fernando Valley State College), where he was a member of Phi Sigma Kappa. During his second semester at CSUN, Marin worked almost full-time at Nordskog Industries in Van Nuys, while enrolled more than full-time as a college student. It was also during this time that Marin was socially introduced to marijuana through his fraternity, a key feature in his later film career, in addition to becoming acquainted with Timothy Leary at a Students for a Democratic Society campus event, who would become a lifelong friend. Soon after graduating CSUN as an English major in 1968, Marin auditioned to sing for Frank Zappa's band, The Mothers of Invention. Not being offered the gig during his audition, Marin moved to Calgary, Alberta the next day in order to evade the draft during the Vietnam War, influenced by the draft evasion movement formed by David Harris. After suffering from a skiing accident, Marin recovered for six months at a Banff residence that only had one vinyl record, Love Child, by the Supremes. Included on that album was the cover song "Does Your Mama Know About Me", co-written by Tommy Chong. Marin eventually met his future comedic partner, Chong, in Vancouver, British Columbia.

== Career ==
=== Comedy albums and films ===
As a part of the highly successful comedy duo Cheech & Chong, Marin participated in a number of comedy albums and feature film comedies in the 1970s and 1980s. Tommy Chong directed four of their films while co-writing and starring in all seven with Marin.

=== Later films and television work ===
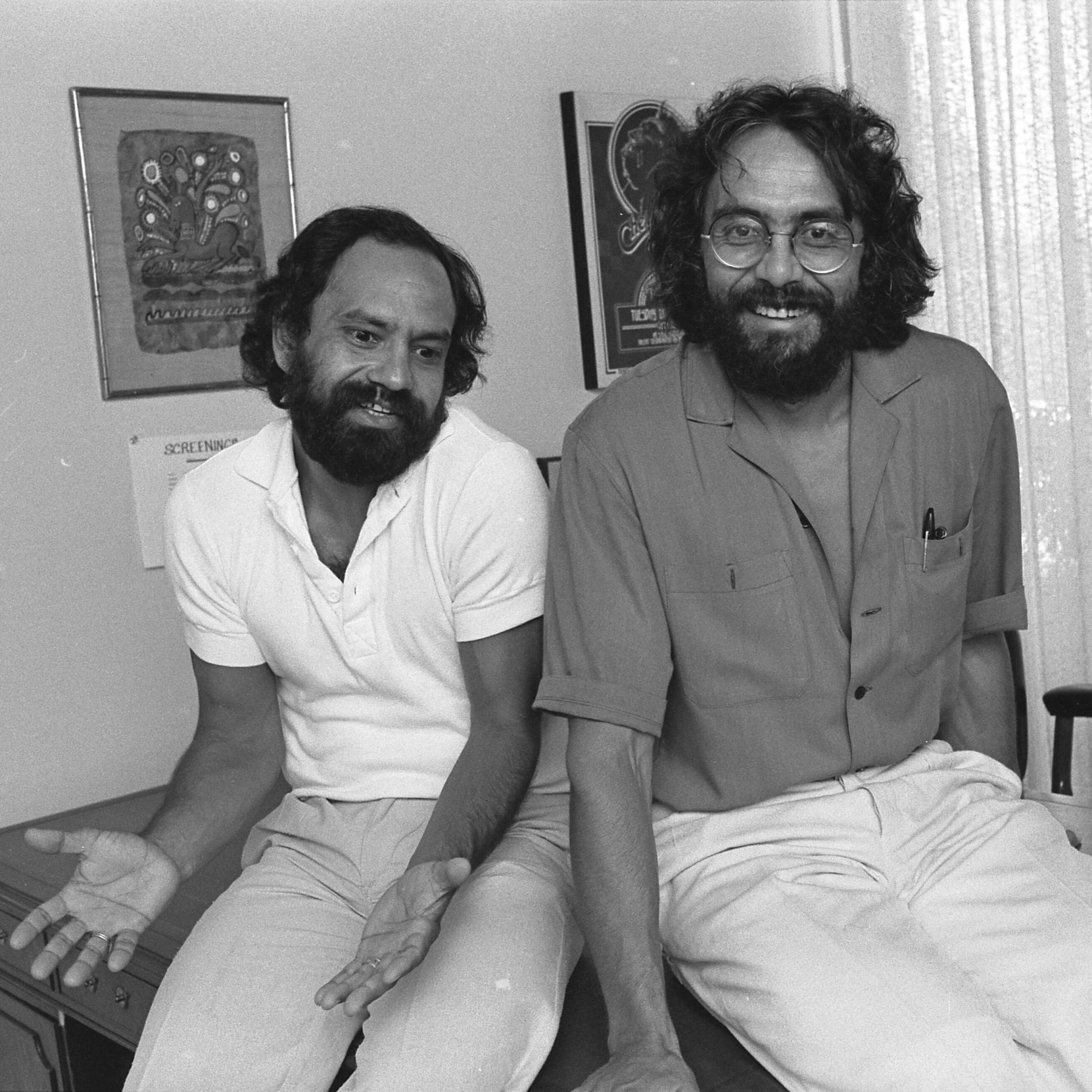
Marin with Tommy Chong in 1979

After Cheech & Chong disbanded in 1985, Marin starred in a number of films as a solo actor, most notably Born in East L.A., which was also his directorial debut, The Shrimp on the Barbie, Tin Cup, and Once Upon a Time in Mexico. Marin made a cameo appearance as a dockworker in Ghostbusters II. In 2004, he made his second appearance as a policeman, as "Officer Salino" in the film adaptation of John Grisham's holiday novel Skipping Christmas, under the title Christmas with the Kranks, starring Tim Allen and Jamie Lee Curtis. In 2009, Marin appeared as an auto mechanic in Race to Witch Mountain. In 2017, he played the voice of a Corrections Officer in the Pixar film Coco.

Marin appeared in the Fox sitcom Married... with Children as the voice of the Bundys' Briard dog, Buck; he voiced the character in three episodes: Look Who's Barking, Change for a Buck and Assault and Batteries. Marin made the transition to full-time television work when he co-starred on the short-lived The Golden Girls spin-off The Golden Palace (1992–1993), and later with Don Johnson, Jaime P. Gomez, and Yasmine Bleeth in the police show Nash Bridges (1996–2001), in which they played San Francisco police-detective partners. A movie of this series was rebooted in 2021. In recent years, Marin has been active in playing supporting roles in films and performing voice overs for animated features. After appearing in a supporting role in Judging Amy, playing an independently wealthy landscape designer, he starred in the CBS sitcom Rob, with Rob Schneider.

Marin is a frequent collaborator of the director Robert Rodriguez, who has worked with Marin seven times; the last two installments of the Mexico trilogy, the Spy Kids trilogy, From Dusk Till Dawn and Machete. He provided his voice for several Disney animated films, most notably Tito the Chihuahua in Oliver & Company (1988), Banzai the hyena in The Lion King (1994), and Ramone in Cars (2006) and its sequels Cars 2 (2011) and Cars 3 (2017). Marin also voiced Manuel in Disney's live-action-animated comedy film Beverly Hills Chihuahua (2008) and played Pancho in The Cisco Kid (1994), and reprised the Banzai role in the video game Kingdom Hearts II.

Marin encouraging people to wear masks during the COVID-19 pandemic as part of the Government of California's "Your Actions Save Lives" campaign in 2020.

Cheech appears in several episodes of AMC's Lodge 49 as El Confidente, a member of Lodge 55 in Mexico.

=== Children's music albums and related works ===
Marin has released two best-selling albums in the children's music genre, My Name is Cheech, the School Bus Driver (1992) and My Name is Cheech, The School Bus Driver "Coast to Coast" (1997). Both albums were released bilingually. In July 2007, the book Cheech the School Bus Driver was released, written by Marin, illustrated by Orlando L. Ramirez, and published by HarperCollins.

In 2005, Marin lent his voice to the animated children's series Dora the Explorer. He appeared in the episode "A Crown for King Juan el Bobo" as the Puerto Rican folk hero Juan Bobo.

=== Additional television appearances ===
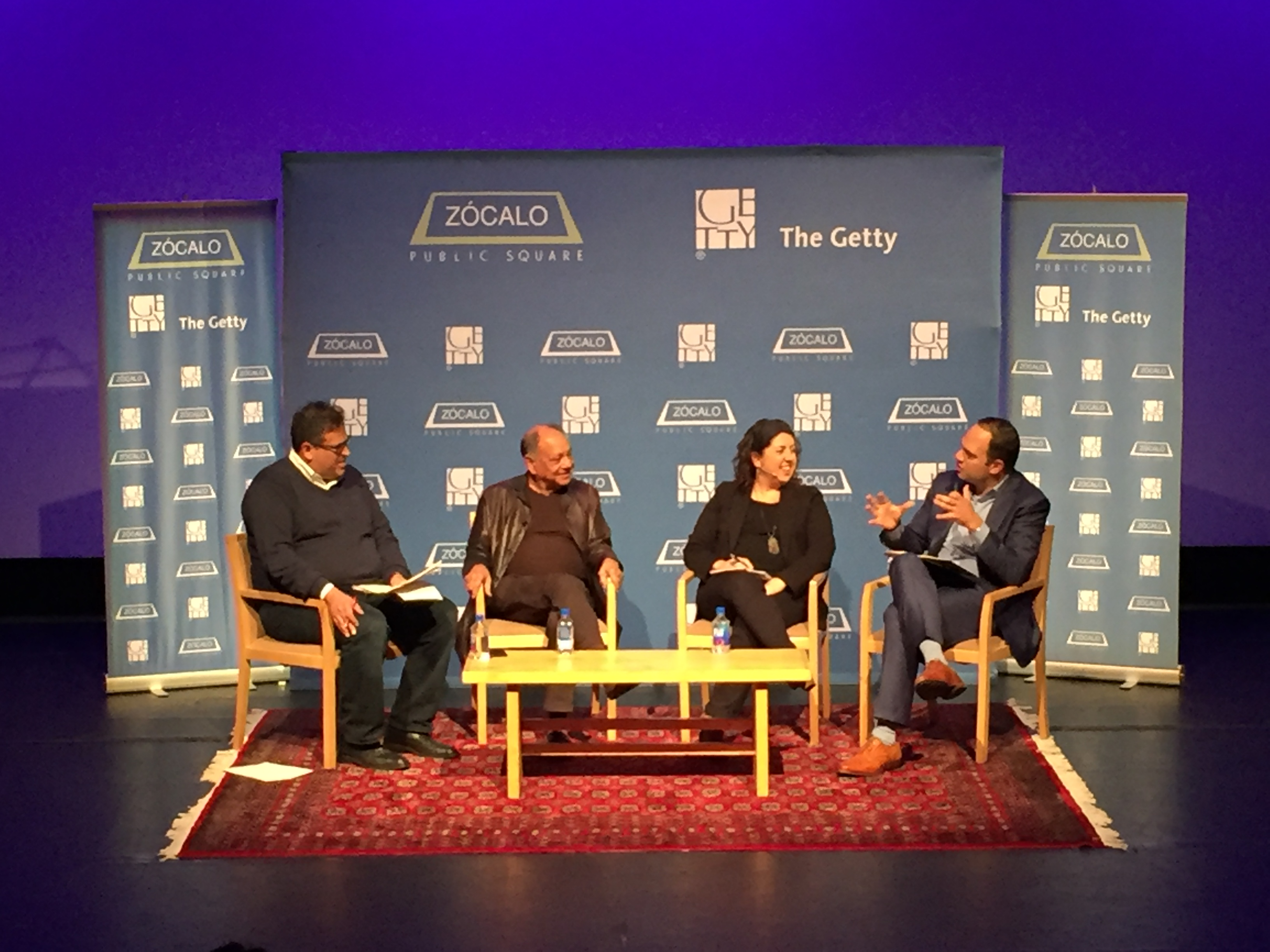
Marin as a panelist at the Getty Museum's 2018 discussion entitled Is Los Angeles Part of Latin America?

In late 2006, Marin participated in Simon Cowell's Celebrity Duets, having sung with Peter Frampton, Randy Travis, Clint Black, Aaron Neville, and Al Jarreau. He was the fourth contestant eliminated.

Marin had a recurring role in the hit television series Lost, playing David Reyes, Hurley's father.

Marin was a co-host for WWE Raw on March 1, 2010, with his comedy partner Tommy Chong, in Oklahoma City. Marin also sings on the hidden track "Earache My Eye" on Korn's album Follow the Leader. It is a cover of an original song by Cheech and Chong. The song is performed by a fictional singer named Alice Bowie, played by Marin, whose appearance consists of a tutu, a Disney mouse ear hat, nipple tassels, an eye mask and dress socks. This character is featured on the cover of Cheech and Chong's Wedding Album and the end of the duo's first film, Up In Smoke.

In 2009, Marin appeared in the Hallmark Channel movie Expecting a Miracle.

On March 18, 2010, Marin beat journalist Anderson Cooper and actress Aisha Tyler on Celebrity Jeopardy!'s Million Dollar Celebrity Invitational. Cooper admitted he was "crushed" by Marin. Marin also won his semifinal round early May, but lost in the finals to Michael McKean and Jane Curtin. He had previously won the first Celebrity Jeopardy! tournament in 1992.

In January 2012, Marin was one of eight celebrities participating in the Food Network reality series Rachael vs. Guy: Celebrity Cook-Off. He was eliminated in the third week of the competition.

== The Cheech Marin Center for Chicano Art, Culture & Industry ==
Marin is an avid collector of Chicano art and started his collection in the 1980s. Two national touring exhibitions have featured works from his private collection. He feels that it's important to "use his celebrity status to call attention to what he saw as an under-appreciated and under-represented style of art". In collaboration with the city of Riverside, California, and the Riverside Art Museum, Marin established The Cheech Marin Center for Chicano Art, Culture & Industry, in the City of Riverside, which opened June 18, 2022. Marin will be donating his collection of over 700 pieces of Chicano art, the largest collection of such art in the world. The center will provide a location for the presentation and study of Chicano art, and is expected to draw international attention.

== Honors and accolades ==
- On June 20, 2025, the L.A. City Council declared June 20 Cheech Marin Day.

== Other interests ==
Marin is an avid golfer, although he initially disliked the sport until he co-starred in the golf-themed comedy Tin Cup. Marin also practices horse archery on a special course built on his private land.

On April 19, 2018, Marin (as part of GLE Brands Inc) signed an agreement with Heritage Cannabis Holdings Corporation (CSE: CANN) to have exclusive rights to use cannabis and cannabis-related products using the Private Stash brand throughout Canada for a period of two years, with the agreement automatically renewing for an additional year upon achieving various milestones.

In 2019, Marin was featured in The Little Mermaid: An Immersive Live-to-Film Concert Experience playing the role of Chef Louis at the Hollywood Bowl.

== Personal life ==
Marin was married in 1975 to Darlene Morley, who co-produced Cheech & Chong's The Corsican Brothers and also played minor roles in earlier Cheech & Chong films under the name Rikki Marin. The couple had one child and divorced in 1984. Marin married artist Patti Heid in 1986; they had two children and have since divorced. Marin married his longtime girlfriend, Russian pianist Natasha Marin, on August 8, 2009, in a sunset ceremony at their home.

Marin resides in Malibu, California. He is a fan of both the Los Angeles Rams of the NFL, and the Los Angeles Dodgers of Major League Baseball.

== Filmography ==
=== Film ===
Year	Title	Role	Notes
1978	Up in Smoke	Pedro de Pacas	
1980	Cheech and Chong's Next Movie	Cheech/Dwayne "Red" Mendoza	
1981	Nice Dreams	Cheech	
1982	Things Are Tough All Over	Cheech/Mr.Slyman/Narrator	
1983	Still Smokin'	Cheech	
1983	Yellowbeard	El Segundo	
1984	Cannonball Run II	Tire Store Employee	
1984	Cheech & Chong's The Corsican Brothers	Corsican Brother	
1985	Get Out of My Room	Cheech/Ian Rotten	
1985	After Hours	Neil	
1986	Charlie Barnett's Terms of Enrollment	Elvis Friend & Fan	
1986	Echo Park	Sid	
1987	Born in East L.A.	Rudy Robles	Also director and writer
1987	Fatal Beauty	Bartender	
1988	Mickey's 60th Birthday	Disney Janitor	
1988	Oliver & Company	Tito the Chihuahua (voice)	
1989	Ghostbusters II	Dock Supervisor	
1989	Rude Awakening	Jesus Monteya	
1989	Troop Beverly Hills	Himself	
1990	Far Out Man	Cheech	
1990	The Shrimp on the Barbie	Carlos Munoz	
1990	Mother Goose Rock 'n' Rhyme	Carnival Barker	
1992	Ferngully: The Last Rainforest	Stump (voice)	
1994	Charlie's Ghost Story	Coronado	
1994	The Magic of the Golden Bear: Goldy III	Master Borgia	
1994	A Million to Juan	Shell Shock	
1994	The Lion King	Azizi (voice)	
1995	Desperado	Short Bartender	
1996	From Dusk till Dawn	Border Guard/Chet Pussy/Carlos	
1996	The Great White Hype	Julio Escobar	
1996	Tin Cup	Romeo Posar	
1998	Paulie	Ignacio	
1999	The Nuttiest Nutcracker	Mac (voice)	Direct-to-video
2000	See You in My Dreams	Estaban	
2000	Luminarias	Jesus	
2000	Picking Up the Pieces	Mayor Machado	
2001	Spy Kids	Felix Gumm The Fake Uncle	
2002	Spy Kids 2: The Island of Lost Dreams	Felix Gumm The Fake Uncle	Cameo
2002	Pinocchio	The Fox (voice)	English dub
2003	Masked and Anonymous	Prospero	
2003	Spy Kids 3-D: Game Over	Felix Gumm The Fake Uncle	Cameo
2003	Once Upon a Time in Mexico	Belini	
2003	Good Boy!	The Henchmen (voice)	
2004	The Lion King 1½	Azizi(voice)	Direct-to-video
2004	Christmas with the Kranks	Officer Salino	
2005	Sian Ka'an	Unknown role (voice)	
2005	Fall Down a School	Erick Matthew, 202, 26, 57, 211 Bus Motorists (voices)	
2005	Underclassman	Captain Victor Delgado	
2006	Cars	Ramone (voice)	
2006	Mater and the Ghostlight	Ramone (voice)	Short film
2007	The Union: The Business Behind Getting High	Himself	
2007	Grindhouse	Padre Benicio Del Toro	
2008	Beverly Hills Chihuahua	Manuel (voice)	
2009	Race to Witch Mountain	Eddie Cortez The Auto Mechanic	
2010	The Perfect Game	Padre Esteban	
2010	Tales from Earthsea	Hare (voice)	US version only
2010	Machete	Padre Benicio Del Toro	Cheech also makes an appearance as the Padre in the (then) fictitious Machete trailer for the 2007 Grindhouse double feature. The trailer appears in the DVD for the Planet Terror portion of Grindhouse.
2011	Cars 2	Ramone (voice)	
2011	Hoodwinked 2: Hood vs. Evil	Mad Hog (voice)	
2012	El Santos vs. La Tetona Mendoza	Narrator, El Charro (voices)	(Spanish-language Mexican animated film)
2012	Tad, The Lost Explorer	Freddy (voice)	US English dub
2013	Cheech & Chong's Animated Movie	Various roles	Also co-writer
2014	The Book of Life	Pancho Rodriguez (voice)	
2016	El Americano: The Movie	Martin (voice)	
2016	Dark Harvest	Ricardo	
2017	Cars 3	Ramone (voice)	
2017	Coco	Corrections Officer (voice)	
2019	The Cheech: An American Icon's Crusade for the Chicano Art Movement	Himself	A documentary covering Marin's lifelong advocacy for Chicano art, and his efforts to develop The Cheech Marin Center for Chicano Art, Culture and Industry.
2020	The War with Grandpa	Danny	
2022	Angry Neighbors	Hector (voice)	
2022	Shotgun Wedding	Robert	
2023	Champions	Julio	
2023	The Long Game	Pollo	
2024	Cheech & Chong's Last Movie	Himself	
2025	Alexander and the Terrible, Horrible, No Good, Very Bad Road Trip	Gil Garcia	

=== Television ===
Year	Title	Role	Notes
1987	The Tracey Ullman Show	Azai	1 episode
1990	Mother Goose Rock 'n' Rhyme	Carnival Barker	
1991	Great Performances	El Cosmico	1 episode
1991–94	Married... with Children	Buck's Voice	3 episodes
1992	Ring of the Musketeers	Burt Aramis	
1992–93	The Golden Palace	Chuy Castillos	24 episodes
1993	Tales from the Crypt	Dr. Beneloy	Episode: "Half-Way Horrible"
1994	The Cisco Kid	Pancho	
1994	Dream On	Waiter	1 episode
1994	Sesame Street	Genie	Episode 3259
1995	Santo Bugito	Lencho the Flea	Unknown episodes
1995	The Courtyard	Angel Steiner	
1995	Happily Ever After: Fairy Tales for Every Child	Alberto (voice)	Episode: "Hansel and Gretel"
1996	Latino Laugh Festival	Host	
1996–98	Tracey Takes On...	Carlos	2 episodes
1996–2001	Nash Bridges	Inspector Joe Dominguez	Main cast; 120 episodes
2000	Funny Flubs & Screw-Ups V	Host	
2000	The 26th Annual People's Choice Awards	Host	
2000	Resurrection Blvd.	Hector Archuletta	
2000	South Park	Carlos Ramirez (voice)	Episode: "Cherokee Hair Tampons"
2003	The Ortegas	Henny Ortega	Unaired TV series
2003	Tracey Ullman in the Trailer Tales	Himself	
2003	George Lopez	Lalo Montenegro	Episode: "Guess Who's Coming to Dinner, Honey"
2004–05	Judging Amy	Ignacio Messina	20 episodes
2005	Dora the Explorer	King Juan el Bobo (voice)	Episode: "A Crown for King Juan el Bobo"
2007	Storm Hawks	Cyclonian Pilot	
2007–09	Lost	David Reyes	3 episodes
2008	Mind of Mencia	Gay man's father	
2008	Grey's Anatomy	Otis	Episode: "Where the Wild Things Are"
2009	MADtv	Himself	
2009	Outnumbered		Television film
2009	Expecting a Miracle	Father Arturo	Television film
2010	WWE Raw	Himself (guest host)	
2011	Off the Map	Papa	
2011	The Simpsons	Himself (voice)	Episode: "A Midsummer's Nice Dream"
2011	Lopez Tonight	Himself	
2012	American Dad!	Horatio (voice)	Episode: "Stanny Tendergrass"
2012	Psych	Deacon Jones	
2012	Rob	Fernando	
2012	Rachael vs. Guy: Celebrity Cook-Off	Himself (celebrity contestant)	
2014	Anger Management	Hector	
2015	Jane the Virgin	Edward	
2017	Disjointed	Cheech	Episode: "The Worst"
2017–20	Elena of Avalor	Quita Moz (voice)	
2018	Rob Riggle's Ski Master Academy	Condor De Bogota	
2018–19	Lodge 49	El Confidente	
2020	Broke	Don Dominguez	Episode: "The Test"
2021	Maya and the Three	Hura / Can / Teca (voice)	5 episodes
2021	Bubble Guppies	Fogzilla (voice)	Episode: "Fogzilla!"
2021	Nash Bridges	Joe Dominguez	Television film
2022	Home Economics	Roberto	Episodes: "Round-Trip Ticket SAN-OAK, $234", "Wedding Bouquet, $125"
2022	Cars on the Road	Ramone (voice)	Episode: "Dino Park"
2023	Lopez vs Lopez	Carlos	Recurring Cast
2023	The Legend of Vox Machina	Trinket (voice)	Episode: "The Fey Realm"
2023	The Muppets Mayhem	Himself	Episode: "Track 4: The Times They Are A-Changing"
2024–25	Primos	Ignacio "Pop" Ramírez Sr. (voice)	Recurring role
2025	Chibiverse	Ignacio "Pop" Ramírez Sr. (voice)	Episode: "Grandparent Napped"
2027	Cars: Lightning Racers	Ramone (voice)	Upcoming series
TBA	The Eric Andre Show	Himself (guest)	Upcoming episode

=== Video games ===
- Animated Storybook: The Lion King (1994) - Banzai (voice)
- Blazing Dragons (1996) - Sir George / Guido the Pizza Chef / Loudmouth Guard
- Scarface: The World Is Yours (2006) - Gaspar Gomez (voice)
- Kingdom Hearts II (2006) - Banzai (voice)
- Cars (2006) - Ramone
- Cars Mater-National Championship (2007) - Ramone
- Cars Race-O-Rama (2009) - Ramone
- Cars 2 (2011) - Ramone
- Disney Infinity (2013) - Ramone
- Cars: Fast as Lightning (2014) - Ramone
- Call of Duty: Modern Warfare III (2024) - Cheech

=== Theme park attractions ===
- It's Tough to Be a Bug! (1998) - Chilic
- Radiator Springs Racers (2012) - Ramone

== Discography ==
- Cheech and Chong (1971)
- Big Bambu (1972)
- Los Cochinos (1973), won Best Comedy Recording at the 16th Annual Grammy Awards
- Cheech & Chong's Wedding Album (1974)
- Sleeping Beauty (1976)
- Up in Smoke (1978)
- Let's Make a New Dope Deal (1980)
- Get Out Of My Room (1985)
- My Name Is Cheech the School Bus Driver (Released October 27, 1992)
- Follow the Leader (1998)

== Books ==
- Marin, Cheech; Hassan, John (2017). Cheech Is Not My Real Name...But Don't Call Me Chong!. New York: Grand Central Publishing. ISBN 9781455592340. OCLC 974034992.

== See also ==
- List of celebrities who own cannabis businesses
