= Born in East L.A. (song) =

Single by Cheech & Chong

from the album Get Out of My Room
- Released: September 1985
- Genre: Comedy
- Songwriters: Bruce Springsteen, Cheech Marin

"Born in East L.A." is a single by Cheech & Chong, released in September 1985. It is a parody of Bruce Springsteen's "Born in the U.S.A.", with references to the song "I Love L.A." by Randy Newman. The song reached No. 48 on the Billboard Hot 100.

Written by Cheech Marin, the song's lyrics deal with a Mexican American from East Los Angeles who is mistaken for an undocumented immigrant and deported. The song served as the basis for the film of the same name, directed by Marin.

== Background ==
Cheech Marin wrote the song without his comedy partner Tommy Chong, although Chong was credited for the song's writing on the album and single. Chong was subsequently insulted when Marin asked him to perform backup vocals on the song, and it was recorded without Chong. It is one of only two Cheech & Chong songs written solely by one member of the duo and not in collaboration, the other being Tommy Chong's "Up in Smoke".

== Music video ==
A music video for the song was produced and appeared in the home video release Get Out of My Room. The video featured appearances from Cassandra Peterson as Elvira, Roberta Vasquez, Jan-Michael Vincent, Ángel Ramírez and Sal Lopez.

== Reception ==
The song was released as Springsteen's Born in the U.S.A. tour was ending, missing the top 40 on the US pop chart. The subsequently released music video became popular.

== Charts ==
Chart (1985)	Peak position
US Billboard Hot 100	48
Australian (Kent Music Report)	53

== Film ==
The song served as the basis for the film Born in East L.A., directed by Marin, which also starred the role alongside Paul Rodriguez, Daniel Stern, Kamala Lopez-Dawson, Jan-Michael Vincent and Lupe Ontiveros. The film debuted well in its first week but dropped by 40% in its second week at the box office.

== See also ==
- Death Valley Days, a show which featured then actor Ronald Reagan, who the protagonist of the song confuses for John Wayne when asked who the President is.
