= Cheech & Chong's Wedding Album =

Studio album by Cheech & Chong
- Released: 1974
- Genre: Comedy
- Length: 38:01
- Label: Ode
- Producer: Lou Adler

Cheech & Chong chronology
Los Cochinos (1973)	Cheech & Chong's Wedding Album (1974)	Sleeping Beauty (1976)

Singles from Cheech & Chong’s Wedding Album
- 1. "Earache My Eye" Released: July 1974; 2. "Black Lassie" Released: October 1974

Professional ratings
Review scores
Source	Rating
Allmusic	2.5/5 stars

Cheech & Chong's Wedding Album is the fourth studio album recorded by comedy duo Cheech & Chong, released in 1974 on Ode Records. It was certified Gold by the RIAA. The single "Black Lassie (A Great American Dog)" reached #71 in Canada.

== Cover art ==
The album cover of Cheech & Chong's Wedding Album had concept origination, design and art direction by Peter Corriston and contained unique artwork that made the album look like an actual wedding album. The album's design was even nominated for a Grammy award.

In the inner fold of the original vinyl LP, there are many pictures of the "wedding and reception". Cheech and Chong, both playing the groom, were dressed to look like conjoined twins, while the bride, a blonde whose face remained hidden by wearing a plain brown bag over her head in every photo, is in the late stages of pregnancy.

Original sleeve inserts contained mail order information for various Cheech & Chong paraphernalia, including candles, T-shirts, and ceramic hand-painted roach clips.

== Track listing ==
Side one
No.	Title	Length
1.	"Championship Wrestling"	6:51
2.	"The Other Tapes"	2:06
3.	"Testimonial by R. Zimmerman"	0:23
4.	"Hey Margaret"	2:49
5.	"Earache My Eye" (with Alice Bowie)	5:21

Side two
No.	Title	Length
1.	"Wake Up America"	5:06
2.	"Black Lassie (A Great American Dog)"	3:50
3.	"Wake Up America (Conclusion)"	1:13
4.	"The Baby Sitters" (with Pedro & Man)	3:21
5.	"Three Little Pigs"	5:12
6.	"Coming Attractions"	1:58
Total length:		38:01

== Charts ==
Chart (1974)	Peak position
Australia (Kent Music Report)	18
Canada (RPM)	6
The Billboard 200	5

== See also ==
- Cheech Marin
- Tommy Chong
