= Get Out of My Room =

Studio album by Cheech & Chong
- Released: 1985
- Recorded: 1985
- Genre: Comedy
- Length: 43:05
- Label: MCA
- Producer: Jeff Eyrich

Cheech & Chong chronology
Let's Make a New Dope Deal (1980)	Get Out of My Room (1985)

Professional ratings
Review scores
Source	Rating
Allmusic	3/5 stars

Get Out of My Room is the seventh studio album by comedians Cheech & Chong, released in 1985. "Born in East L.A." and "I'm Not Home Right Now" were released as singles from the album, and a visual album was produced, containing music videos from the LP as well as sketches.

== Track listing ==
=== Side 1 ===
No.	Title	Length
1.	"**Born in East L.A.**"	4:52
2.	"Dorm Radio I"	2:41
3.	"**I'm Not Home Right Now**"	3:41
4.	"Sushi Bar"	3:55
5.	"Dorm Radio II"	2:11
6.	"**Love Is Strange**"	3:34
7.	"Dorm Radio III"	1:10

=== Side 2 ===
No.	Title	Length
8.	"I'm a (Modern) Man"	5:37
9.	"The Music Lesson"	4:35
10.	"The Stupid Early Show"	0:47
11.	"Warren Beatty"	0:31
12.	"Juan Coyote"	1:18
13.	"Radio News"	3:41
14.	"**Get Out of My Room**"	4:06

Tracks in bold are songs.

== Visual album ==
In 1985 a 53-minute visual album was made, presented in a mockumentary style akin to This Is Spinal Tap (1984). The visual album was written and directed by Cheech Marin. In the visual album, he and Tommy Chong are shown attempting to finish a "video album" for their novelty record Get Out of My Room. In between fake interview segments and behind-the-scenes footage are music videos for the songs "Get Out of My Room", "I'm Not Home Right Now", "Love Is Strange", and "Born in East L.A." (a parody of Bruce Springsteen's "Born in the U.S.A.". In the visual album's story, the duo find themselves overworked and over-budget in an attempt to finish the four music videos. The visual album also features cameos from Cassandra Peterson (Elvira), Beverly D'Angelo, John Paragon, Mary Woronov, Playboy Playmate Alana Soares and her sister Leilani. Patti Heid, Cheech's second wife, art-directed the videos.

In the "Get Out of My Room" music video, Cheech plays Ian Rotten, the egotistic control-freak leader of a British punk rock group, and Chong plays 'The Man', an American guitarist who plays for the group. Both have been set up in a gym to record the music video for their song. Several basketball players show up and play a game in the background, despite Rotten's complaints. The two begin to pretend to play the song (with Ian lip-synching poorly and Man failing to synch up his actions with the recording).

The song "Born in East L.A." became novelty hit and received regular airtime on MTV. "Born in East L.A." was later made into a film of the same name; Cheech Marin wrote, directed and starred in the film, without Chong's involvement.

Get Out of My Room was released on DVD in the United Kingdom, but not in the United States, where it was only available on VHS. The LP remained unavailable on compact disc until 2002. The visual album was released in the U.S. on DVD in the Cheech and Chong Midnight Munchies Pack with Cheech and Chong's Next Movie and Born in East L.A. on October 13, 2015.

== Charts ==
Chart (1985)	Peak position
Australia (Kent Music Report)	96
