= Los Cochinos =

Studio album by Cheech & Chong
- Released: August 1973
- Recorded: 1973
- Genre: Comedy
- Length: 42:39
- Label: Ode Records/ Warner Bros. Records/ WEA
- Producer: Lou Adler

Cheech & Chong chronology
| Big Bambu (1972) | Los Cochinos (1973) | Cheech & Chong's Wedding Album (1974) |

Los Cochinos
- Inner cover.

Los Cochinos ("The Pigs") is the third album by the comedy duo Cheech & Chong, released in 1973. The Spanish term cochino is a derogatory way of referring to a pig, as it also means "dirty", in contrast to cerdo, a more neutral word for a pig as an animal. In this context, "cochino" ("[dirty] pig") equates to the American derogatory term "pig" for "police officer".

== Packaging ==
The album cover of Los Cochinos had concept origination, design and art direction by Peter Corriston. The package design was nominated for a Grammy award. The first production release of this album on long playing vinyl was an example of the elaborate album art of the era. The packaging of the first release included a die cut cover showing a car door, and another die cut cardboard inner cover showing the usually sealed parts of a car door (which contained baggies of marijuana); the cardboard edge of the opening of the cover was cut decoratively around the windshield in the upper right corner. Subsequent re-pressings of the recording have not replicated the die-cut packaging.

The credits and track listing consisted of a black and white photograph of hand written graffiti also on a car door (four pairs of feet suggestively situated in the driver's side window) enclosed on a single sheet in the album. Additional graffiti includes the early 1970s arithmetic statement:

2 Good
+ 2 Be
________
4 Gotten,

a "↑ Made in U.S.A." and the classic "Wash Me!"

== Reception and performance ==
Professional ratings
Review scores
| Source | Rating |
|---|---|
| Allmusic | 4.5/5 stars |

In a review of the album published in Rolling Stone, Janet Maslin found Cheech and Chong's humor to be running thin by this point, asking, "is this really the best we can do for comedy? (...) There's nothing funny about it." Nevertheless, the album not only matched the chart performance of Big Bambu by reaching #2 on the Billboard Albums Chart, but also earned the duo their one and only Grammy for Best Comedy Recording at the 16th Grammy Awards. In Canada the album was #4 for 3 weeks.

== Track listing ==
All material written by Thomas Chong and Cheech Marin.

Side one
| No. | Title | Length |
|---|---|---|
| 1. | "Sargent Stadanko" | 6:31 |
| 2. | "Peter Rooter" | 0:20 |
| 3. | "Up His Nose" | 3:24 |
| 4. | "Pedro and Man at the Drive-Inn" | 12:44 |

Side two
| No. | Title | Length |
|---|---|---|
| 1. | "The Strawberry Revival Festival" | 3:24 |
| 2. | "Don't Bug Me" | 1:27 |
| 3. | "Evelyn Woodhead Speed Reading Course" | 0:36 |
| 4. | "Les Morpions" | 5:55 |
| 5. | "Cheborneck" | 1:12 |
| 6. | "White World of Sports" | 3:02 |
| 7. | "Basketball Jones by Tyrone Shoelaces and Rap Brown Jr. H.S. Band" | 4:04 |

== Personnel ==
- Guitar – George Harrison
- Bass – Klaus Voormann
- Organ – Billy Preston
- Electric Piano – Carole King
- Piano – Nicky Hopkins
- Horns – Dick "Slyde" Hyde, George Bohanon, Paul Hubinon
- Percussion – Jim Keltner
- Drums – Jim Karsten
- Saxophone – Tom Scott
- Cheerleaders – The Blossoms (Darlene Love, Fanita James, and Jean King) and Michelle "Trixie" Phillips

== Production ==
- Producer – Lou Adler
- Engineer – Norm Kinney
- Recorded by [All Recording-Studio-Live-Mixing And More], Mixed by – Bongo Norm Kinney
- Artwork [Collages] – Paul Zammit
- Artwork [Tinting] – Andy Reichline, Reed Hutchinson
- Design – Peter Corriston
- Photography by – Ed Caraeff

=== "Evelyn Woodhead Speed Reading Course" ===
This track is a parody of the numerous speed reading courses available in the United States in the 1960s and 1970s, written by Cheech and Chong. The title specifically refers to the Evelyn Wood course.

Voiced by Cheech Marin, the piece begins with the words delivered phonetically:

Ever since I took the Evelyn Woodhead Sped Riddin' course, my riddin' has [Cheech carefully sounds out the syllables somewhat incorrectly] im-PROVVed one hunert percent [pause] and "comprenshun" has increased "won-der-full-lee". I recommend the Evelyn Woodhead Sped Riddin' course to all mah friends out there, and you tell 'em you heard it here first on Roller Derby.

The short spoken word testimonial style skit was an efficient parody of commercials that were prevalent on the television and radio stations in that era.

=== "Basketball Jones" ===
The album's final track, "Basketball Jones featuring Tyrone Shoelaces", is a music track which features George Harrison on guitar, Carole King, Billy Preston, Jim Keltner, Klaus Voormann, Nicky Hopkins, Jim Karstein and Tom Scott, with Darlene Love, Fanita James, Jean King, Ronnie Spector and Michelle Phillips (The Mamas & the Papas) as cheerleaders.

Animated in 1974 by Paul Gruwell, parts of this music video were featured in the 1979 movie Being There. This track was also released as a single and reached #15 on the Billboard Hot 100 and #36 in Canada.
