= Sleeping Beauty (Cheech & Chong album) =

Studio album by Cheech & Chong
- Released: 1976
- Genre: Comedy
- Length: 46:20
- Label: Ode; A&M; Warner Bros.
- Producer: Lou Adler

Cheech & Chong chronology
Cheech & Chong's Wedding Album (1974)	Sleeping Beauty (1976)	Up in Smoke (1978)

Professional ratings
Review scores
Source	Rating
Allmusic	link

Sleeping Beauty is the fifth album by the comedy duo Cheech & Chong. It was released in 1976 on vinyl LP, 8-track, and cassette. It went out of print in 1978 except for a CD release in 1991 and a digitally remastered CD in 2005.

== Cover ==
The album cover and title refer to the once-popular drug secobarbital, a barbiturate derivative commonly known as "reds". Used for epilepsy and insomnia, the drug was widely abused in the 1960s and 1970s. The original LP album cover folded out into a giant red capsule, bearing a pharmaceutical code resembling that of secobarbital pills of the 1970s. The inner sleeve featured a photo of a "red" placed on a person's tongue; this image was used as the cover art for the remastered CD. Many other references to "reds" have been made on Cheech & Chong's albums and in their films.

== Track listing ==
Side A
No.	Title	Lyrics	Music	Length
1.	"The Big Sniff" (Starring Ralph & Herbie)			4:56
2.	"The Adventures of Red & Roy" (The Last Round-Up)			5:37
3.	"T.W.A.T." (Tactical Women's Alert Team)			6:32
4.	"Pedro's Request"			3:46
5.	"Framed"	Cheech & Chong	Jerry Leiber; Mike Stoller	2:40

Side B
No.	Title	Length
6.	"Jimmy"	3:24
7.	"Uncle Pervy"	3:24
8.	"Sleeping Beauty"	16:12
Total length:		46:20

== Charts ==
Chart (1976)	Peak position
Australian (Kent Music Report)	84
