= Big Bambu =

Studio album by Cheech & Chong
- Released: June 1972
- Genre: Comedy
- Length: 34:14
- Label: Ode Records/Warner Bros. Records / WEA
- Producer: Lou Adler

Cheech & Chong chronology
Cheech and Chong (1971)	Big Bambu (1972)	Los Cochinos (1973)

Professional ratings
Review scores
Source	Rating
AllMusic	4.5/5 stars

Big Bambu is the second album by Cheech & Chong, released in 1972. The name Big Bambu is a reference to the actual Bambu brand of rolling paper. The original LP concept and album package was approved by the producer Lou Adler and designed by Ron Larson and manufactured by Sound Packaging Corp. to look like a giant rolling paper package, and contained a giant rolling paper with the record. Vinyl copies with the rolling paper have become collectible and hard to find. The original CD packaging has been slightly reformatted, and does not contain rolling papers.

In generally positive review published in Rolling Stone, Janet Maslin singled out the duo's voice work for particular praise. "The thing Cheech and Chong are great with is voices. Each has terrific ears for dialect, anything from spare change wino to jiveass soul, and there are at least 20 distinct personae showing up here, all of them cleverly done."

The album was nominated for Best Comedy Recording at the 15th Grammy Awards, but lost to George Carlin's FM & AM.

The album was #10 for 3 weeks in Canada, and was on the charts for 39 weeks.

== Track listing ==
Side one
No.	Title	Length
1.	"Sister Mary Elephant"	3:38
2.	"Ralph and Herbie"	3:24
3.	"Streets of New York or Los Angeles or San Francisco or..."	2:34
4.	"Rebuttal: Speaker Ashley Roachclip"	1:56
5.	"The Continuing Adventures of Pedro de Pacas and Man"	6:22

Side two
No.	Title	Length
1.	"The Bust"	2:02
2.	"Television Medley: a) Tortured Old Man; b) Empire Hancock; c) Let's Make a Dope Deal; d) Unamerican Bandstand"	14:18 3:08 1:08 3:57 6:05
