= Cheech & Chong =

Comedy duo

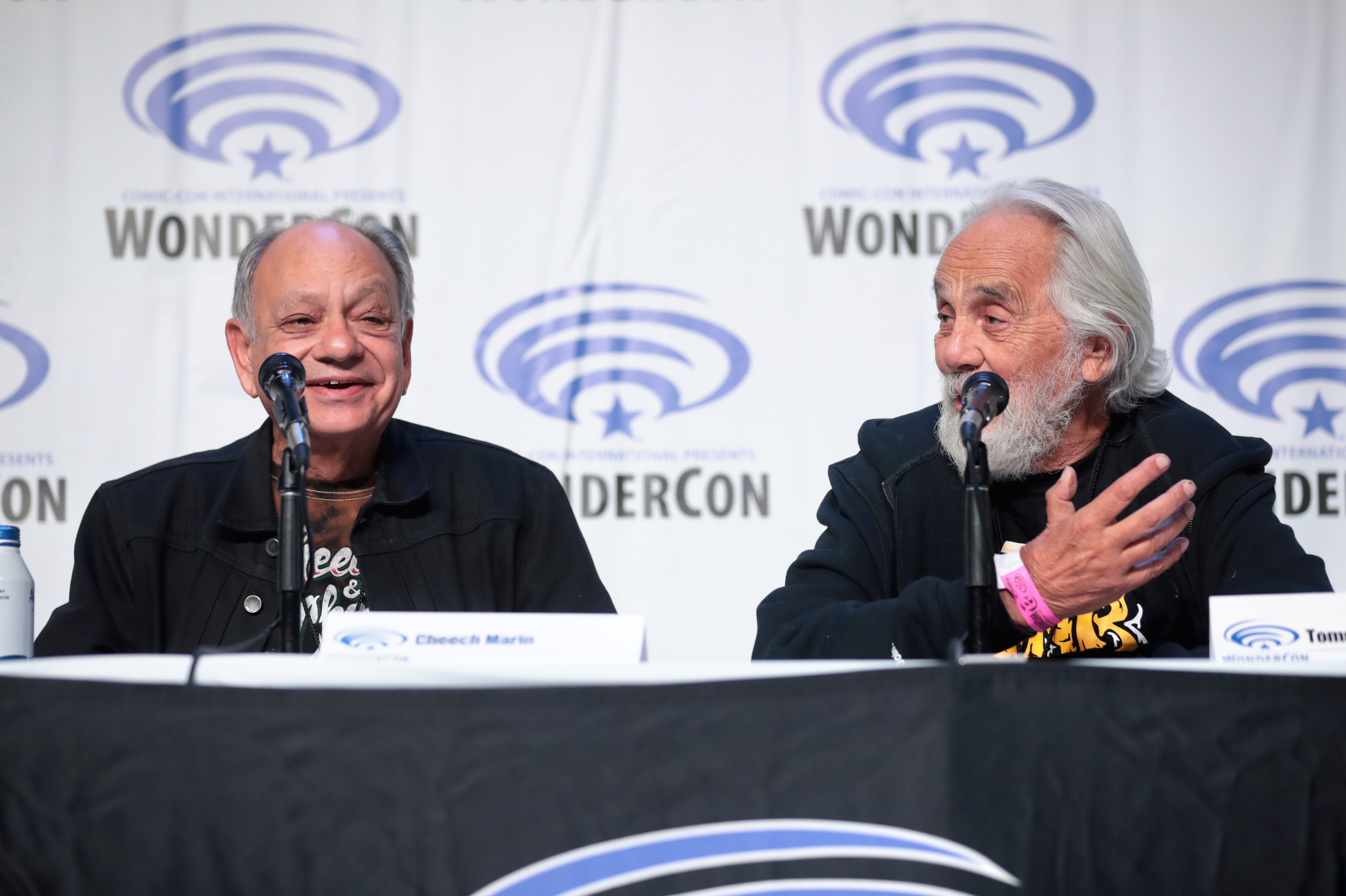
- Cheech Marin and Tommy Chong at the 2022 WonderCon

Comedy career
- Years active: 1971–1985; 2004–present
- Medium: Film, stand-up, music, television
- Genres: Black comedy; character comedy; musical comedy; political satire; sketch comedy; stoner comedy
- Subjects: Latin American culture, drug culture, everyday life, recreational drug use

Cheech & Chong are a comedy duo founded in Vancouver and consisting of American Cheech Marin and Canadian Tommy Chong. The duo found commercial and cultural success in the 1970s and 1980s with their stand-up routines, studio recordings, and feature films, which were based on the hippie and free love era, the drug and counterculture movements, and their love for cannabis.

== Career ==
=== Early years ===
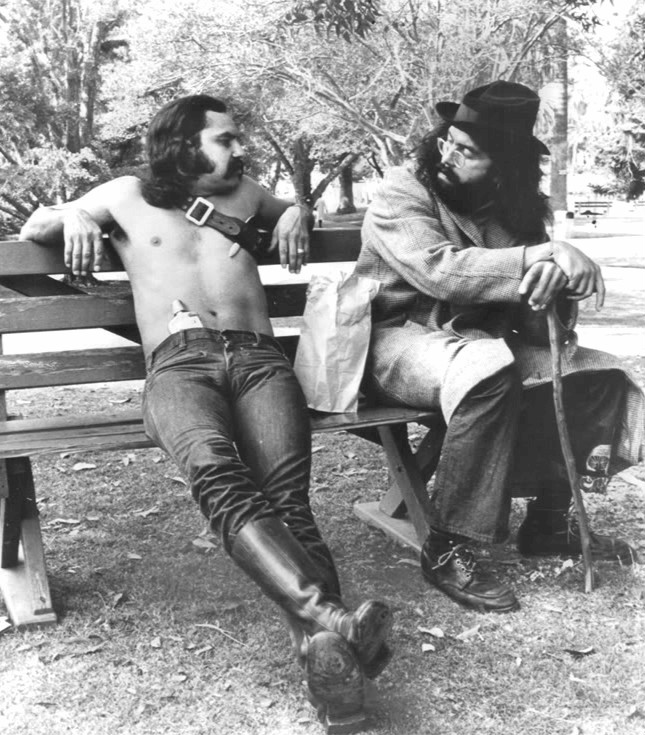
Cheech and Chong in the early 1970s

The duo met in Vancouver, British Columbia, in 1969. Chong was a Canadian citizen, and Cheech had moved there from Southern California to avoid the draft at the height of the Vietnam War. Chong had formed an improv group called "City Works" after seeing Second City Improv while touring as a musician. City Works performed as part of a "hippie burlesque" at Shanghai Junk, a strip club owned by Chong's family. Marin briefly joined City Works as a replacement for the original straight man.

According to Chong's book The Unauthorized Autobiography, the two came out one night to warm up the crowd for a new musical group of Chong's, but never relinquished the stage due to the audience's strong laughter. As the improv group had not been a financial success at the strip club—they drew a large but low-spending crowd—the two decided to form a comedy duo and play different venues. Successful as a duo, they eventually moved to Los Angeles.

=== Mainstream success ===
The pair performed stand-up shows, released many successful comedy record albums, and starred in a series of low-budget films. Some of their best-known comedy routines and songs include "Earache My Eye", "Basketball Jones", "Santa Claus and His Old Lady", and "Sister Mary Elephant". Perhaps their most famous line is "Dave's not here", from their self-titled debut album.

In 1974, Cheech & Chong contributed background voices on the song "Twisted", on Joni Mitchell's album Court and Spark.

In 1975, Cheech & Chong featured on the Hoyt Axton track "No No Song," on Axton's album Southbound. They are credited with "attempted temptation" in the liner notes.

Their early success culminated with the release of their first feature-length movie, Up in Smoke, in 1978. The film was successful enough at the box office (grossing over $44 million despite a low budget) to warrant two sequels: Cheech and Chong's Next Movie in 1980, and Nice Dreams in 1981. These were followed by the less successful Things Are Tough All Over (1982) and Still Smokin (1983). The pair attempted a departure from their stoner comedy with 1984's Cheech & Chong's The Corsican Brothers.

In 1979, Cheech & Chong were given the Comedy Medal from Mira Costa College.

Cheech & Chong appeared in smaller supporting roles in Graham Chapman's Yellowbeard (1983) and Martin Scorsese's After Hours (1985).

In 1985 the duo released their album Get Out of My Room, which included the novelty hit song "Born in East L.A." (based on Bruce Springsteen's "Born in the U.S.A."). This song later served as the basis for the 1987 film of the same title, in which Marin played the starring role. Immediately following the release of the album, Marin separated himself from the pair's drug-inspired act by working on a solo career.

=== Reunion ===
After their contentious parting in the 1980s, the duo spent years without working together. In 1992 they worked together for the first time in several years, voicing characters in the animated film FernGully: The Last Rainforest. In 1997, Chong made an appearance on Marin's TV series Nash Bridges, in an episode titled "Wild Card," which contained a reference to their iconic "Dave" skit from their 1972 debut album. In 2000 the performers voiced characters in the animated television series South Park for the episode "Cherokee Hair Tampons", but their voices were recorded separately. Marin and Chong indicated in a 2003 episode of Biography that they were willing to reunite.

The duo had plans to reunite for another film when Chong's California-based company, Chong's Glass, was raided by federal officials in February 2003, as part of a federal crackdown on "drug-related paraphernalia". In a plea bargain which allowed his son and wife to remain out of jail, Chong pleaded guilty to charges of conspiring to distribute drug paraphernalia in May, and in September 2003 was sentenced to nine months in federal prison, fined $20,000, and forced to forfeit $120,000 in assets. He was released in July 2004. His cellmate was Jordan Belfort.

In 2007, Brett Harvey's marijuana advocacy documentary The Union: The Business Behind Getting High starred Tommy Chong as a commentator about marijuana related issues and his drug paraphernalia charge in 2003. The film had many other notable names such as former Vancouver mayor Larry Campbell, Canadian marijuana seed retailer Marc Emery, Canadian baking marijuana icon "Watermelon Girl", and other marijuana advocates like author and former "Pot TV" manager ChrBennett and former High Times editor Steve Bloom.

Beginning in September 2008, Cheech and Chong reunited for the Light Up America comedy tour which opened in Ottawa, making a radio program appearance on The Bob & Tom Show.

On November 5, 2008, Cheech and Chong appeared in a Funny or Die video titled "Cheech and Chong Get Out the Vote!" The video, which encouraged people to get out and vote, was released the day after the United States general election. On November 30, 2008, Cheech & Chong were honored during the roast special Cheech & Chong: Roasted on TBS hosted by Brad Garrett which included other guests, among them Chong's wife. The event was filmed at Caesars Palace in Las Vegas during The Comedy Festival.

In March 2009, they recorded two shows at the Majestic Theatre in San Antonio for a DVD release of the reunion tour. On April 17, 2009, while on the Sydney leg of their "Cheech and Chong Light Up Australia" Tour, they had to delay the start of their show as it became the target of a drug operation by the New South Wales Police. About 25 police and four drug dogs were involved, searching around 50 people, with six people caught in possession of small amounts of cannabis.

On January 25, 2010, Cheech & Chong appeared on Lopez Tonight. During a singing segment they started to perform their song "Mexican Americans", but it turned into "Get It Legal", in reference to their current U.S. tour. On March 1, 2010, Cheech & Chong were the guest hosts of WWE Raw in Oklahoma City. On April 20, 2010 (4/20) Cheech and Chong's Hey, Watch This, the DVD filmed in San Antonio on March 14, 2009, was released.

In September 2011, Cheech & Chong appeared in a viral video posted on YouTube which at first appeared to be a trailer for a (non-existent) upcoming movie titled Cheech & Chong's Magic Brownie Adventure, but which at the end revealed itself to be a commercial for Fiber One 100-calorie snack brownies.

Cheech & Chong were guest stars on the animated sitcom The Simpsons, on the episode "A Midsummer's Nice Dream". The episode focuses on a fictitious separation of the duo, with Homer taking Chong's place.

2013 saw the release of Cheech & Chong's Animated Movie, adapted from the audio of the duo's comedy albums.

On September 28, 2014, they were guests of Doug Benson on his podcast Getting Doug with High.

The pair appeared together on The Late Show with Stephen Colbert on April 23, 2018, in response to recent news that John Boehner had joined the board of a marijuana company. The pair expressed displeasure that marijuana was no longer rebellious, Cheech remarking that he could now buy weed "from a store in a strip mall" when before he could only buy it from "behind a store in a strip mall". They then joked that they would no longer be doing stoner comedy and would do comedy about things that were still illegal, such as unpasteurized dairy products, importing exotic reptiles, taping and distributing football games without the consent of the NFL, and burning leaves without a permit.

Cheech & Chong were selected by the Red Hot Chili Peppers to present to them the Global Icon Award at the 2022 MTV Video Music Awards on August 28, 2022.

On April 17, 2024, Cheech & Chong were added to Call of Duty: Warzone & Modern Warfare III as a part of a purchasable bundle worth 3,000 CoD Points (equivalent to 30 USD). In this bundle, the player receives both Cheech & Chong as playable characters, as well as three weapon blueprints with special "Pain Puff Tracers" and the "Doobie Dismemberment" effect upon killing an enemy, a unique execution, loading screen, weapon charms, and decals.

== Unproduced films ==
In 1980, there were plans to make a film called Riding High with Cheech & Chong.

Ivan Reitman conceived Stripes as a Cheech and Chong vehicle. Cheech and Chong's manager thought the script was very funny; however, the comedy duo wanted complete creative control, so Reitman told the screenwriters to rewrite it for Bill Murray and Harold Ramis.

Screenwriter Tom McLoughlin also pitched a sequel to the slasher film Friday the 13th in which Cheech and Chong, playing camp counselors, faced off against killer Jason Voorhees, as a comedy horror movie in the vein of Abbott and Costello Meet Frankenstein.

The hyenas Banzai and Shenzi in the 1994 animated film The Lion King were storyboarded as being characters modeled after Cheech and Chong. Due to the duo not getting along with each other at the time, and Whoopi Goldberg taking interest in the role of Shenzi, Chong was not cast, but Cheech played the part of Banzai.

In 2009, Cheech & Chong announced a proposed reunion movie, tentatively titled Grumpy Old Stoners. The following year, Up in Smoke 2 was announced, with Marin slated to direct. In March 2014, they announced they were working on a new movie, with writer/director Jay Chandrasekhar. In 2020, Chong said that he wanted to make a Cheech & Chong horror movie.

== Discography ==
- Cheech and Chong (1971)
- Big Bambu (1972)
- Los Cochinos (1973)
- Cheech & Chong's Wedding Album (1974)
- Sleeping Beauty (1976)
- Let's Make a New Dope Deal (1980)
- Get Out of My Room (1985)

== Filmography ==
- Up in Smoke (1978)
- Cheech and Chong's Next Movie (1980)
- Nice Dreams (1981)
- Things Are Tough All Over (1982)
- Still Smokin (1983)
- Cheech & Chong's The Corsican Brothers (1984)
- Get Out of My Room [Visual album] (1985)
- Cheech & Chong's Animated Movie (2013)
- Cheech & Chong's Last Movie (2024)

== Mobile app and game ==
- Cheech and Chong's The Fatty (2011)
- Cheech and Chong's Bud Farm (2020)
