= Ode Records =

American record label

- Founded: 1967
- Founder: Lou Adler
- Defunct: 1989
- Status: Defunct
- Country of origin: United States

Ode Records (also known as Ode Sounds and Visuals) was an American record label, started by Lou Adler in 1967 after he sold Dunhill Records to ABC Records. It was distributed by CBS's Epic Records except between 1970 and 1976, when the label was distributed by A&M Records. The original incarnation was closed in 1978 and CBS took over most of catalog, often with Epic logos replacing Ode logos on reissues. Ode has the distinction of being the first non-CBS label to be distributed by CBS Records.

Adler reactivated the label several times, including another short run with A&M in 1989. It was disbanded when A&M was sold to PolyGram in late 1989.

Ode is now part of Sony Music Entertainment (the successor to CBS), excluding:

- Cheech & Chong catalogue is controlled by Warner Music Group. After Cheech & Chong switched to Warner Bros. Records in 1978, they took also its past catalog to their new home label. Depending on reissue, they can have "Warner Bros. Records Inc.", "Warner Records Inc." or "Ode Records" printed as copyright owner. It is believed that Lou Adler still owns copyrights for its Ode releases.
- Soundtrack to The Rocky Horror Picture Show and the London Symphony Orchestra's version of Tommy are still owned by Lou Adler, with reissues distributed under license to third party oldies labels like Rhino, Castle Communications and more recently, The Orchard, another subsidiary of Sony Music.

== Artists ==
- Jan Berry
- The Blossoms
- Cheech & Chong
- Merry Clayton
- The Comfortable Chair
- Don Everly
- Mark Guerrero
- Carole King
- Peggy Lipton
- London Symphony Orchestra (Tommy)
- Scott McKenzie
- Tom Scott
- Spirit
- David T. Walker
- The Rocky Horror Show
- The Rocky Horror Picture Show

== See also ==
- List of record labels
