= Pure Danger =

1996 film directed by C. Thomas Howell

- Directed by: C. Thomas Howell
- Written by: Joseph John Barmettler; William Applegate Jr.
- Produced by: Richard Pepin; Joseph Merhi
- Starring: C. Thomas Howell; Teri Ann Linn; Michael Russo; Marcus Chong; Leon
- Cinematography: Ken Blakey
- Edited by: Scott Riddle
- Music by: Alex Wilkinson
- Production company: PM Entertainment Group
- Distributed by: PM Entertainment Group
- Release date: September 10, 1996 (U.S.)
- Running time: 99 minutes
- Country: United States
- Language: English

Pure Danger is a 1996 action film starring and directed by C. Thomas Howell. It co-stars Teri Ann Linn, Michael Russo, Marcus Chong and Leon. The story concerns an ex-con cook (Howell) and a waitress (Linn) who happen upon stolen diamonds, and find themselves on the run from the two gangs looking to get them back, respectively led by a mafioso (Russo) and his African-American rival (Leon).

== Cast ==
- C. Thomas Howell as Johnie Dean
- Teri Ann Linn as Becky
- Michael Russo as DePalma
- Marcus Chong as Freethrow
- Leon as Felix
- Rick Shapiro as Dice
- Ray Laska as Miccelli
- Bill Rutkoski as Tony (as Bill Rutkowski)
- Elisa Leonetti as Stella
- Lou Casal as Farmentero
- Andre Rosey Brown as Shyboy
- Irwin Keyes as Killjoy
- Chris Devlin as Thug
- Patricia Scanlon as Receptionist
- Carrot Top as Morgue truck driver
- Darren Dalton as Cook
- Greg Bronson as Police officer
- Don Most as Parole officer

== Production ==
Pure Danger was C. Thomas Howell's second film as a director after 1995's Hourglass. The transition remained difficult, as people often dismissed it as an actor's whim, and his private lifestyle did not give him much political sway in Hollywood. The IMDb, based on unspecified sources, has filming taking place during parts of September and October 1995. Although some establishing shots place scenes in Las Vegas, main unit photography took place in Los Angeles. Comedian Scott "Carrot Top" Thompson, who had a similar cameo in Hourglass, makes an appearance as a morgue truck driver in the climactic chase.

=== Comments by Marcus Chong ===
In a 2019 book detailing his grievances against the movie business, actor Marcus Chong blames Howell and PM for destroying his relationship with the William Morris talent agency during the making of this film. According to Chong, he took the part of "Freethrow" as a favor to his sister Rae Dawn Chong, who was Howell's ex-wife. He was later called to perform ADR, but could not attend on the desired date due to his commitment to a stage play. Chong claims that Howell was unduly rigid in refusing to reschedule the recording session. Instead, the director joined PM employees in making angry phone calls to Chong and William Morris, causing him be let go and hurting his career.

== Release ==
Pure Danger was released on VHS by PM Entertainment on September 10, 1996.

== Reception ==
Pure Danger has received mixed to positive reviews. Mike Mayo of The Roanoke Times praised the "quickly paced action" and the "terrific car chases" for which PM Entertainment is known. Although he found that some Tarantino stylings were "blatantly borrowed, the L.A. locations are well-chosen and the humor is rough, earthy, and original", making the film "refreshingly unpredictable". Mistakenly referring to it as Howell's directorial debut, VideoHound's Golden Movie Retriever called the movie "fast paced and surprisingly entertaining". Sister publications TV Guide and The Motion Picture Annual were less enthusiastic, describing it as "a convoluted crime caper" which "borders on the truly tasteless, and features too many criminals to keep track of". It further complained that "[i]t's never quite clear whether Pure Danger is intended as comedy or drama."

== Related works ==
Howell directed and starred in another crime film for PM Entertainment the following year, The Big Fall.
