= Shelby Chong =

American stand-up comedian (born 1948)

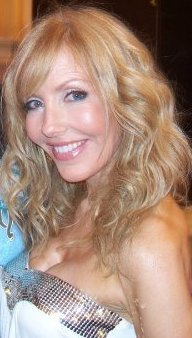
- Chong in January 2010
- Born: Shelby Fiddis; February 1, 1948 (age 78); Los Angeles, California, U.S.
- Spouse: Tommy Chong (m. 1975)
- Children: 4; including Marcus

Comedy career
- Medium: Stand-up, film, television
- Genre: Cannabis culture

Shelby Chong (née Fiddis; born February 1, 1948) is an American comedian, actress and producer who was the executive producer of Best Buds (2003) and the associate producer of four Cheech & Chong films. She is married to the comedian and actor Tommy Chong.

== Early life ==
Shelby (Sharon) Fiddis was born in Los Angeles, California in 1948. She attended Gladstone Secondary School in Vancouver, BC from Grade 7 to 12, graduating in 1966.

== Career ==
Interested in acting and comedy, she started performing in local clubs as a stand-up comedian.

Shelby Chong acted in Cheech & Chong's Next Movie (1980), Nice Dreams (1981) and Things Are Tough All Over (1982). She was associate producer for Still Smokin' (1983) and Cheech & Chong's The Corsican Brothers (1984). and in Far Out Man (1990) as Tree. Her notable acting roles include "Nancy Reynolds" in Sandman (1993), “Professor Jones” in Class of Nuke 'Em High 2: Subhumanoid Meltdown (1991), credited as “Shelby Shepherd”.

Shelby Chong performed as Tommy's opening act at his comedy shows from 1996 to 2000, when she became his comedy partner. Since Cheech and Chong's reunion in 2008, Shelby performed as their opening act at sold-out comedy shows on their cross-country tour.

== Personal life ==
In 1975 in Los Angeles, Fiddis married Canadian actor and comedian Tommy Chong, becoming his second wife. They have three children together: Precious (b. 1968), Paris (b. 1974), and Gilbran (b. 1981). They also adopted Marcus Wyatt (b. 1967) in 1978. Marcus took the surname of his adoptive parents and siblings when he turned eighteen. Shelby Chong is also the stepmother to Tommy's two daughters from his first marriage, Rae Dawn and Robbi. Marcus and all three of his sisters have each pursued acting careers, and his two brothers have acted in occasional family movie productions.
