= Bigfoot Wars =

- Directed by: Brian T. Jaynes
- Screenplay by: Andrea Doss; Frederic Doss; Jacob Mauldin
- Based on: Bigfoot Wars by Eric S. Brown
- Produced by: Nicholle Walton
- Starring: C. Thomas Howell
- Cinematography: Michael John Marcinik
- Edited by: Brian T. Jaynes; Justin Purser
- Music by: Justin R. Durban
- Production company: Edgen Films
- Distributed by: Origin Releasing
- Release date: March 10, 2014
- Running time: 75 minutes
- Country: United States
- Language: English

Bigfoot Wars is a 2014 American science fiction film directed by Brian T. Jaynes and starring C. Thomas Howell. The film is based on Eric S. Brown's book series of the same name.

== Plot ==
After the mayor of Boggy Creek is murdered by an unknown assailant, local news reporter Kendall Sharp for KRKR-8 News delivers a special report on a series of disappearances and unsolved murders. After first suggesting that Sasquatch may be responsible for the murders, Sharp suggests that local criminal Eddie Justertin, a member of a "self-styled, Dixieland mafioso family," may be the one to blame.

The following day, six young adults (Steve, Heather, Amanda, Danny, Jo, and Collyn) trespass into a closed section of a state park, where they plan to camp for the weekend. After playing volleyball and drinking some beer, the teens separate. Moments later, they are attacked by Bigfoot. Some (but not all) of the campers are killed on screen. The next day, Sheriff Jim Taylor and Deputy Walton arrive to investigate the murders. While there, an unidentified police official arrives on the crime scene and informs the sheriff that one of the victims (Steve McTee) is the son of a local oil tycoon, who is putting pressure on the department to solve the murder. The sheriff believes the teens have been attacked by a bear, but his deputy believes in Bigfoot. Through a phone call, the sheriff learns that only five bodies were found, and that one of the campers, a female, is missing.

On the other side of town, ex-deputy Mark Kline (who was fired for being an alcoholic) discovers a missing and disheveled woman named Dakota running through the woods. While rescuing her, Kline spots a Bigfoot in the woods before driving off and delivering Dakota to the local hospital. At the hospital, Sheriff Taylor interviews his drunk ex-deputy, who swears he saw a Bigfoot. In a separate interview, the local doctor (Dr. Leonard Evans) tells the sheriff that the wounds do not look like they came from a bear, but that is what he will put on the death certificate. The sheriff visits Dakota's home in an attempt to tell the girl's father Zeke that she has been located, but is met with hostility by the girl's family.

That evening, the sheriff's daughter Savannah goes to the local drive-in with her boyfriend Billy. While the two are making out in Billy's car, Bigfoot enters the drive-in and crushes Billy's head by stomping on it before dragging Savannah off into the woods.

The next day, news reporter Sharp along with her camera man (Aaron) head into the woods in search of Bigfoot. They find him, and the monster chases them through the woods. Back at the sheriff's office, sheriff Taylor, Deputy Walton, and Dakota's father Zeke form a posse to enter the woods and find the sheriff's daughter.

While fleeing from Bigfoot, reporter Sharp and cameraman Aaron stumble upon the hideout of Eddie Justertin. Eddie fires a warning shot followed by a second shot from point blank range that misses the two. The two flee the shed but cameraman Aaron is quickly killed after stepping on a landmine. Reporter Sharp fires several shots at Bigfoot with Aaron's handgun and fails to kill the beast, but then the sheriff and his posse arrive and Deputy Walton shoots Bigfoot several times with a tactical shotgun, killing it. The deputy then turns around and is impaled by a spear thrown by someone/something off screen.

Zeke performs a Bigfoot call and a second Bigfoot emerges from the woods, which Zeke promptly shoots in the head. During a long speech, Zeke explains to the sheriff and the reporter that all female Bigfoot have gone extinct, and Bigfoot must now survive by kidnapping human females and impregnating them. Back at the hospital, Dr. Evans discovers that Dakota is indeed pregnant. Later, Dakota gives birth, and asks to see her baby.

Back in the woods, the sheriff's posse discover Bigfoot's lair, where the creatures rape their human victims. There they discover the sheriff's daughter Savannah alive, and free her. While the sheriff frees his daughter, Zeke finds a Bigfoot, attacks it with a sledgehammer, cuts its head off, and carries it around. The two girls escape from the lair and are seen running through the woods, but when Zeke uses explosives to try and close up the cave, he accidentally separates the two parties.

Zeke and Sheriff Taylor emerge from another exit and enter a clearing. There, many Bigfoot (six or more) emerge from the woods and surround the two men. The men are able to shoot a couple of Bigfoot, but there are too many. Zeke produces a rocket launcher and shoots more, but more than half a dozen remain. Armed with only a machete and a sledgehammer, the two men hold their ground until more than a dozen Bigfoot pounce on them, ripping the two men to shreds.

== Cast ==
- C. Thomas Howell as Zeke
- Judd Nelson as Dr. Leonard Evans
