= Red Dawn =

1984 action film directed by John Milius

- Original theatrical release poster by John Alvin
- Directed by: John Milius
- Screenplay by: Kevin Reynolds; John Milius
- Story by: Kevin Reynolds
- Produced by: Buzz Feitshans; Barry Beckerman; Sidney Beckerman
- Starring: Patrick Swayze; C. Thomas Howell; Lea Thompson; Ben Johnson; Harry Dean Stanton; Ron O'Neal; William Smith; Powers Boothe
- Cinematography: Ric Waite
- Edited by: Thom Noble
- Music by: Basil Poledouris
- Production companies: United Artists; Valkyrie Films
- Distributed by: MGM/UA Entertainment Company
- Release date: August 10, 1984
- Running time: 114 minutes
- Country: United States
- Languages: English; Spanish; Russian
- Budget: $17 million
- Box office: $38 million

Red Dawn is a 1984 American action drama film directed by John Milius, from a screenplay co-written with Kevin Reynolds, and starring Patrick Swayze, Charlie Sheen, C. Thomas Howell, Lea Thompson and Jennifer Grey, with supporting roles played by Ben Johnson, Darren Dalton, Harry Dean Stanton, Ron O'Neal, William Smith and Powers Boothe. Set during a fictional World War III between an increasingly isolated United States and the Soviet Union, the film follows a group of teenage guerrillas, known as the Wolverines, fighting against a joint Soviet-Latin American invasion force in Colorado.

Despite mixed reviews from critics, the film became a commercial success, grossing $38 million against a budget of $17 million. It was the first film to be released in the United States with a PG-13 rating under the modified rating system introduced on July 1, 1984. A remake was released in 2012.

== Plot ==
In the 1980s, the United States has become increasingly isolated after NATO is dissolved and Western Europe's nuclear weapons are removed. The Soviet Union is devastated by a failed wheat harvest and is forced to use military intervention in Poland to suppress food and labor riots. Soviet allies Cuba and Nicaragua build up their military strength, while expanding their influence across El Salvador and Honduras. Along with this, a Soviet-allied government is established in Mexico following a coup d'état.

High school students in Calumet, Colorado, witness a surprise Soviet-led invasion of their town. Brothers Jed and Matt Eckert escape the chaos of a Soviet paratroop attack. When Soviet, Cuban, and Nicaraguan soldiers occupy Calumet, Jed, Matt, and their friends Robert, Danny, Daryl, and Arturo flee into the countryside with camping supplies, food, and weapons taken from Robert's father's store. They evade a Soviet roadblock assisted by a U.S. helicopter gunship, and narrowly escape into the mountains where they go into hiding.

Weeks later when their supplies run low, the group agrees to go into town to find out what’s going on. While Danny, Daryl and Arturo remain at their camp, Jed, Matt and Robert return to Calumet where they discover they’re wanted by the KGB and that Mr. Eckert and other dissenters are being held at a re-education camp at Calumet's drive-in. They surreptitiously visit him and learn that Mrs. Eckert is dead. He asks his sons to avenge him.

Visiting the Mason family in occupied territory, they learn that Robert's father has been executed and they are forty miles away from the nearest safe zone. The Masons ask Jed and Matt to care for their granddaughters, Toni and Erica, as the group retreats back to their camp. The group is eventually discovered in their forest hideout by a small group of Soviets, whom they kill in self-defense. The group begins launching guerilla attacks on the occupation forces, calling themselves the "Wolverines" after their high school mascot. The occupiers respond with brutal crackdowns, such as executing large groups of civilians by firing squad which include Mr. Eckert and Arturo's father.

The Wolverines encounter crashed USAF pilot Andrew Tanner who informs them of the current state of the war: several American cities, including Washington, D.C., Omaha, Nebraska and Kansas City, Missouri were destroyed by nuclear strikes, Strategic Air Command was crippled by Cuban saboteurs, and paratroopers seized key positions in preparation for full-scale invasion via Mexico and Alaska. Denver has been under heavy siege the last three months. Most of the southwestern United States and northwestern Canada are occupied, but American counterattacks halted their advance between the Rocky Mountains and the Mississippi River. Western Europe has chosen to remain neutral, and America's only remaining foreign allies, China and the United Kingdom, actively resist the Soviets but are militarily crippled.

After witnessing the Wolverines take down a Russian armored column, Tanner joins them in leading a raid to free political prisoners. While visiting the Mason’s, Jed learns that stories of the Wolverines success has reached the US controlled territory and that the US military plans to send Green Berets to assist them around Spring time. The Wolverines later visit the frontline where Tanner plans to return back to friendly territory but are ambushed by Russian tanks. Tanner and Arturo are killed in the ensuing battle.

Soviet Spetsnaz commander Colonel Strelnikov arrives to track down the Wolverines and orders the retaliatory killings of American civilians to stop. The spoiled Daryl defies Jed's orders and warnings, venturing into town to rescue his father on his own and is arrested by the KGB when his brainwashed father betrays him. Daryl is forced to swallow a tracking device and released to rejoin the Wolverines. Soviet troops track the group but are ambushed by the Wolverines, who capture one of the Soviets alive. After questioning the Soviet leads nowhere, Matt gets the tracker to work, which points to Daryl. The group assembles to execute Daryl and the Soviet, arguing about whether what they are about to do is right, but Jed shoots the Soviet. Daryl pleads for mercy, but is killed by a furious Robert.

The remaining Wolverines are ambushed by Soviet helicopter gunships, which kill Toni and Robert. Jed and Matt attack the occupation forces in Calumet as a distraction to help Danny and Erica escape to friendly territory. Strelnikov mortally wounds Jed and Matt before Jed kills him with his grandfather's pistol. Although the brothers are discovered and held at gunpoint by Cuban Colonel Ernesto Bella, he lets them escape in a moment of disillusionment about the war. The dying brothers sit together in a playground during their final moments. Danny and Erica trek through the mountains and reach American-held territory.

The film closes with a shot of a plaque on a mountainside, fenced off, with a U.S. flag flying nearby. The plaque identifies the location as Partisan Rock, and reads the following:

In the early days of World War III, guerrillas, mostly children, placed the names of their lost upon this rock. They fought here alone and gave up their lives, so that this nation shall not perish from the earth.

== Cast ==
- Patrick Swayze as Jed Eckert
- C. Thomas Howell as Robert Morris
- Lea Thompson as Erica Mason
- Charlie Sheen as Matt Eckert
- Darren Dalton as Daryl Bates
- Jennifer Grey as Toni Mason
- Brad Savage as Danny
- Doug Toby as Arturo "Aardvark" Mondragon
- Powers Boothe as Lt. Colonel Andrew Tanner, USAF
- Ben Johnson as Jack Mason
- Lois Kimbrell as Mrs. Mason
- Harry Dean Stanton as Tom Eckert
- Ron O'Neal as Colonel Ernesto Bella, Cuban Revolutionary Army
- William Smith as Colonel Strelnikov, Spetsnaz
- Vladek Sheybal as General Bratchenko, Soviet Army
- Frank McRae as Mr. Teasdale
- Roy Jenson as Samuel Morris
- Pepe Serna as Mr. Mondragon
- Lane Smith as Mayor Bates
- Radames Pera as Sgt. Stepan Gorsky
- Sam Slovick as Yuri
- Judd Omen as Nicaraguan Captain

== Production ==
=== Ten Soldiers ===
Originally called Ten Soldiers, the script was written by Kevin Reynolds. Producer Barry Beckerman read it, and, in the words of Peter Bart, "thought it had the potential to become a tough, taut, 'art' picture made on a modest budget that could possibly break out to find a wider audience." His father Sidney Beckerman helped him pay a $5,000 option. Reynolds wanted to direct but the Beckermans wanted someone more established. Walter Hill briefly considered the script before turning it down, as did several other directors.

The Beckermans pitched the project to David Begelman at MGM, but were turned down. They tried again at that studio when it was run by Frank Yablans. Senior vice-president for production Peter Bart, who remembers it as a "sharply written anti-war movie ... a sort of Lord of the Flies", took the project to Yablans.

The script's chances increased when Reynolds became mentored by Steven Spielberg, who helped him make Fandango; the script was eventually purchased by MGM.

=== John Milius ===
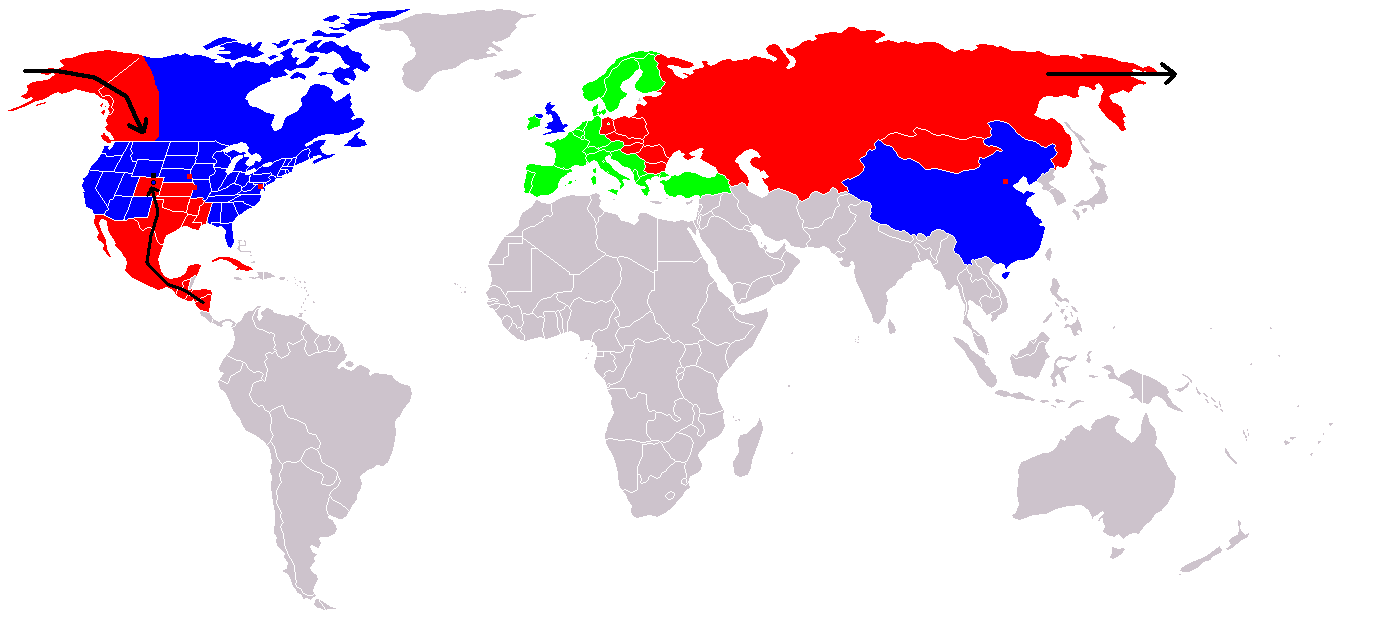
Approximate map of the events described in the movie: Blue: The United States and its allies Canada, the United Kingdom and China. Red: The Soviet Union and its allies Cuba and Nicaragua. Green: The neutral countries of Western Europe. The arrows show the invasion routes, and the red dots show the cities that were destroyed by nuclear weapons: Washington, D.C., Omaha, Nebraska, Kansas City, Missouri and Beijing.

Bart recalls that things changed when "the chieftains at MGM got a better idea. Instead of making a poignant little antiwar movie, why not make a teen Rambo and turn the project over to John Milius, a genial filmmaker who loved war movies. The idea was especially popular with a member of the MGM board of directors, General Alexander Haig, the former Nixon chief of staff, who yearned to supervise the film personally and develop a movie career."

Bart says most of MGM's executives, except for Yablans, were opposed to Milius directing. Bart claims he made a last minute attempt to get Reynolds to direct the film and went to see Spielberg. However, by this stage, Fandango was in rough cut, and Bart sensed that Spielberg was disappointed in the film and would not speak up for Reynolds. Milius was signed to direct at a fee of $1.25 million, plus a gun of his choice.

Milius set about rewriting the script. He and Haig devised a backstory in which the circumstances of the invasion would occur; this was reportedly based on Hitler's proposed plans to invade the U.S. during World War II. Haig took Milius under his wing, bringing him to the Hudson Institute, the conservative think tank founded by Herman Kahn, to develop a plausible scenario. Milius saw the story as a Third World liberation struggle in reverse; Haig introduced Nicaragua and suggested that, with the collapse of NATO, a left-wing Mexican government would participate in the Soviet invasion, effectively splitting the U.S. in half. Bart says, "Even Milius was taken aback by Haig's approach to the project. 'This is going to end up as a jingoistic, flag-waving movie,' Milius fretted. As a result, the budget of this once $6 million movie almost tripled."

Other changes included a shift in focus from conflict within the group to conflict between the teens and their oppressors, and the acceleration of the ages of some of the characters from early teens to high school age and beyond. There was also the addition of a sequence where some children visit a camp to find their parents have been brainwashed.

Milius later said: "I see this as an anti-war movie in the sense that if both sides could see this, maybe it wouldn't have to happen. I think it would be good for Americans to see what a war would be like. The film isn't even that violent – the war shows none of the horrors that could happen in World War III. In fact, everything that happened in the movie happened in World War II."

Bart says Yablans pushed through filming faster than Milius wanted because MGM needed a movie over the summer. Milius wanted more time to plan, including devising futuristic weaponry and to not shoot over winter, but had to accede.

The Department of Defense had originally agreed to provide assistance to the production on the basis the film "would have a positive impact and benefit to the military services and in the [national] interest", although the Air Force objected to the language used by one of the pilot characters. However, Milius ultimately decided not to cooperate with the department after deciding doing so would be too expensive.

=== Casting ===
Milius wanted Robert Blake to play the American pilot, but was overruled by Frank Yablans. Powers Boothe was selected instead.

=== Filming ===
The movie was filmed in and around the city of Las Vegas, New Mexico. Many of the buildings and structures which appear in the film, including a historic Fred Harvey Company hotel adjacent to the train depot, the train yard, and a building near downtown, which was repainted with the name of "Calumet, Colorado", referencing the town in Michigan, are still there today. An old Safeway grocery store was converted to a sound stage and used for several scenes in the movie.

Powers Boothe later claimed that "Milius cut out the emotional life of its characters. Originally, my character was anti-war, as well as a rightist. I was supposed to be the voice of reason in that movie. But certain cuts negated my character."

Lea Thompson said the original cut featured a love scene between her and Powers Boothe, but it "was cut out after some previews because of the age difference. And that was the main reason I took the movie—it was such a terrific scene." Similarly, a sex scene that took place in a sleeping bag was scripted between the characters Jed and Toni, but was abandoned after a failed take. Jennifer Grey stated this was because Patrick Swayze was drunk and couldn't remember his lines while filming, while Grey was high on marijuana, stating: "And then it got cut. And they said, 'We'll come back and reshoot it.' But of course they didn't." Her negative interaction with Swayze made her anxious about working with the actor again in Dirty Dancing.

There were scenes filmed at and around a McDonald's restaurant and at least one picture of Soviet officers around the restaurant exists. However, the scenes were cut before the movie was finished, supposedly due to a shooting at a McDonald's less than a month before release.

The Soviet Mi-24 "Hind-A" helicopter-gunships were mocked-up and built around French SA 330 Pumas. Some of the weaponry devised for the film did not work. Futuristic helicopters created for the film did not have FAA approval to fly over people.

The budget increased from $11 million to $15 million. It ultimately cost $19 million.

=== Music ===
The film's score was composed and conducted by Basil Poledouris and performed by the Hollywood Studio Symphony.

== Reception ==
=== Box office ===
Red Dawn was the 20th highest-grossing film of 1984, opening on August 10, 1984, in 1,822 theaters and taking in $8,230,381 on its first weekend. Its box office gross is $38,376,497.

=== Critical reaction ===
Red Dawn received mixed reviews, receiving a "Rotten" 48% rating on Rotten Tomatoes based on 27 reviews, with an average rating of 5.6/10. The website's consensus reads: "An appealing ensemble of young stars will have some audiences rooting for the Wolverines, but Red Dawn's self-seriousness can never conceal the silliness of its alarmist concept." Metacritic, which uses a weighted average, assigned the film a score of 53 out of 100, based on 15 critics, indicating "mixed or average" reviews.

Colin Greenland reviewed Red Dawn for Imagine magazine, and stated that "Red Dawn [...] is a self-congratulatory little B-picture, the sort America does so well. Set in the early months of World War Three, it's a loving chronicle of juvenile heroism in Russian-occupied Colorado. Schoolkids caught behind enemy lines become crack guerillas overnight. Slaughter nobly, die even more so. Nice scenery, shame about the movie."

The New York Times reviewer Janet Maslin said: "To any sniveling lily-livers who suppose that John Milius ... has already reached the pinnacle of movie-making machismo, a warning: Mr. Milius's Red Dawn is more rip-roaring than anything he has done before. Here is Mr. Milius at his most alarming, delivering a rootin'-tootin' scenario for World War III."

MGM apologized to Alaska war veterans for the film's advertising, which claimed that no foreign troops had ever landed on U.S. soil, overlooking the Aleutian Islands campaign of World War II, where Japanese soldiers occupied the Aleutian Islands, part of the Territory of Alaska.

At the time it was released, Red Dawn was considered the most violent film by the Guinness Book of Records and the National Coalition on Television Violence, with a rate of 134 acts of violence per hour, or 2.23 per minute. The 2007 DVD Special Edition includes an on-screen "Carnage Counter" in a nod to this.

A few days after the NCTV survey came out, 35 protestors picketed the MGM/UA building in opposition to the film. John Milius said:

What these people really don't like is that the movie shows violence being perpetrated against Russian and Cuban invaders, which is what the demonstration was all about. My question is, where were all these demonstrators when the Russians shot down that airliner? Were they cheering? And what about the people being gassed and yellow-rained in Afghanistan? ... There's really no pleasure in outraging these people. I suppose next some extreme right-wing organization will give me an award, which is equally ridiculous.

United States President Ronald Reagan and his wife Nancy Reagan were reported to have watched and enjoyed the film during his presidency.

=== Later reputation ===
National Review Online has named the film No. 15 in its list of the "Best Conservative Movies." Adam Arseneau at the website DVD Verdict opined that the film "often feels like a Republican wet dream manifested into a surrealistic Orwellian nightmare".

According to Jesse Walker of Reason:

The film outraged liberal critics, but further to the left it had some supporters. In a witty and perceptive piece for The Nation, Andrew Kopkind called it "the most convincing story about popular resistance to imperial oppression since the inimitable Battle of Algiers", adding that he'd "take the Wolverines from Colorado over a small circle of friends from Harvard Square in any revolutionary situation I can imagine."

Libertarian theorist Murray Rothbard argued that the film was "not so much pro-war as it is anti-state." Rothbard gave the film a generally positive review, while expressing some reservations with the story:

One big problem with the picture is that there is no sense that successful guerrilla war feeds on itself; in real life the ranks of the guerrillas would start to swell, and this would defeat the search-and-destroy concept. In Red Dawn, on the other hand, there are only the same half-dozen teenagers, and the inevitable attrition makes the struggle seem hopeless when it need not be. Another problem is that there is no character development through action, so that, except for the leader, all the high school kids seem indistinguishable. As a result, there is no impulse to mourn as each one falls by the wayside.

Ed Power writes for The Independent:

From a political perspective, many will find its simplistic vision problematic. But the visceral punch of Red Dawn is nonetheless undeniable. It puts pedal to the floor early on and keeps it there to the end. It is one of the most relentless films ever made.... As with Conan and Apocalypse Now, the air of unrelenting doom is an acquired taste. Yet this grit has served as a preservative. Red Dawn holds up surprisingly well today. Not simply in terms of its action set pieces but in its portrait of America as a place where the frontier mentality lives on just beneath the surface.

Writing for Foreign Policy, Antonio De Loera-Brust instead suggested that Red Dawn was meant as a critique of American foreign policy, describing the film's core message as "that those under occupation have the right to fight back." Describing it as "a profoundly anti-war and anti-imperialist film", De Loera-Brust proposed that the film asked Americans: "How would you like it if somebody did that to you?" in reference to the American invasions of other nations, and stated the Wolverines "stand in for any teenagers from any land who have taken up arms against a foreign invader, from the Ukrainian partisans of World War II to the Palestinian kids throwing rocks at Israeli tanks."

=== Home media ===
Red Dawn has been variously released across a variety of formats.

- In 1985, Red Dawn released on VHS. It was also released at the same time on PAL and Betamax.
- Also in 1985, Red Dawn released on LaserDisc. The film was released several times on this format, with the latest in April 1994.
- In 1998, Red Dawn released on DVD.
- In 2007, a two-disc DVD Collector's Edition was released. Unusual among the "extras" are interviews of residents recalling the filming of the movie.
- In 2015, a DVD release featured Red Dawn with the 2012 remake. Another release the same year excluded the remake.
- In 2017, the Collector's Edition was released on Blu-ray.
- In 2022, Shout! Factory released Red Dawn on 4K Ultra HD Blu-ray.

== References in the film ==
The movie being shown to American prisoners at the re-education camp is Sergei Eisenstein's Alexander Nevsky (1938).

Much of the story is set in the Arapaho National Forest, and a group of Soviet soldiers refer to the Colorado War, which was fought there between the Arapaho and Cheyenne tribes and the U.S. government.

During one scene, the young freedom fighters sit and listen to a radio playing messages meant for guerrillas behind the lines. The message played, "John has a long mustache", is one of the messages that was used before D-Day in Normandy to signal French partisans of the imminent invasion. The broadcast of this message is dramatized in the 1962 film The Longest Day.

== Operation Red Dawn ==
The operation to capture former Iraqi dictator Saddam Hussein was named Operation Red Dawn and its targets were dubbed "Wolverine 1" and "Wolverine 2". Army Captain Geoffrey McMurray, who named the mission, said the naming "was so fitting because it was a patriotic, pro-American movie". Milius approved of the naming, saying: "I was deeply flattered and honored. It's nice to have a lasting legacy".

== Cultural influence ==
Red Dawn has been referenced by and influenced a number of other media, including music, books, film, and video games.

=== Books, film and television ===
- Numerous references occur in the movie Hot Tub Time Machine, including the movie playing in the Ski Patrol station and being watched by Blaine, who considers it one of the best movies of all time.
- "Grey Dawn" is a South Park episode which parodies Red Dawn where the old people of the town, fed up with how they are treated, take over the quiet Colorado town.
- The 2006 Family Guy episode "Hell Comes to Quahog" features a cutaway gag flashing back to Peter Griffin performing in a stage musical adaptation of Red Dawn on Broadway.
- The 2017 American military drama series SEAL Team episode "Rolling Dark" contains numerous references to Red Dawn, such as the one scene where a SEAL operator shouts the Wolverines' motto to the Russian pursuers.
- The 2006 American Dad episode "With Friends Like Steve's" references Red Dawn with characters Stan Smith and Barry play-acting as the Wolverines and Smith saying "it's the best movie ever filmed."

=== Music ===
- Rock musician David Rosenthal formed the prog rock group Red Dawn in 1992 with drummer Chuck Burgi and bassist Greg Smith.

=== Video games ===
Red Dawn has influenced a number of video games.

- Freedom Fighters is a 2003 video game that takes place during a Soviet invasion of New York. This game is heavily influenced by Red Dawn's characters, costumes, and design. The game's last mission closely resembles one of the movie's final scenes, when the Wolverines attack the Soviet base.
- The plot of Call of Duty: Modern Warfare 2 includes an invasion of the United States by an ultra-nationalist Russia, where members of the United States Army's 75th Ranger Regiment have to repel the attack. The achievement "Red Dawn" is awarded for completing the American "Wolverines!" and "Exodus" missions in Veteran difficulty. "Wolverines!" itself is a reference to the movie.
- Homefront, a video game also written by John Milius about a unified Korea invading North America, borrows heavily from the movie. One notable Easter egg relating to the film is a large billboard at a school sport stadium which reads "Go Wolverines!!!". In turn, the plot of the 2012 remake of Red Dawn borrows heavily from Homefront, including the use of a united Korean threat, the use of rural and suburban settings for the primary action, and partisan warfare.

=== Red Dawn emails ===
In the wake of the COVID-19 pandemic, a string of emails by Trump administration officials detailing concerns about the government's response to COVID-19 was dubbed the "Red Dawn emails" in reference to the film.

=== Russian invasion of Ukraine ===
During the Russian invasion of Ukraine, several Russian armored vehicles destroyed by Ukrainian forces around Kyiv appeared with the word "Wolverines" spray-painted in white, though it is unclear whether they were painted by civilians or soldiers.

== Remake ==
A remake of Red Dawn directed by Dan Bradley was released in 2012. The film takes place in the 2010s and follows a North Korean invasion of the United States. Milius criticized the remake after reading an original script where the villains were instead Chinese:

There was a strange feeling to the whole thing. They were fans of the movie so they put in stuff they thought was neat. It's all about neat action scenes, and has nothing to do with story. ... There's only one example in 4,000 years of Chinese territorial adventurism, and that was in 1979, when they invaded Vietnam, and to put it mildly they got their [butts] handed to them ... Why would China want us? They sell us stuff. We're a market. I would have done it about Mexico.

== See also ==
- Culture during the Cold War
- Survival film
- World War III in popular culture
- The Price of Freedom (role-playing game)
- Tomorrow, When the War Began (film)
