= Robbi Chong =

Canadian actress and former model (born 1965)

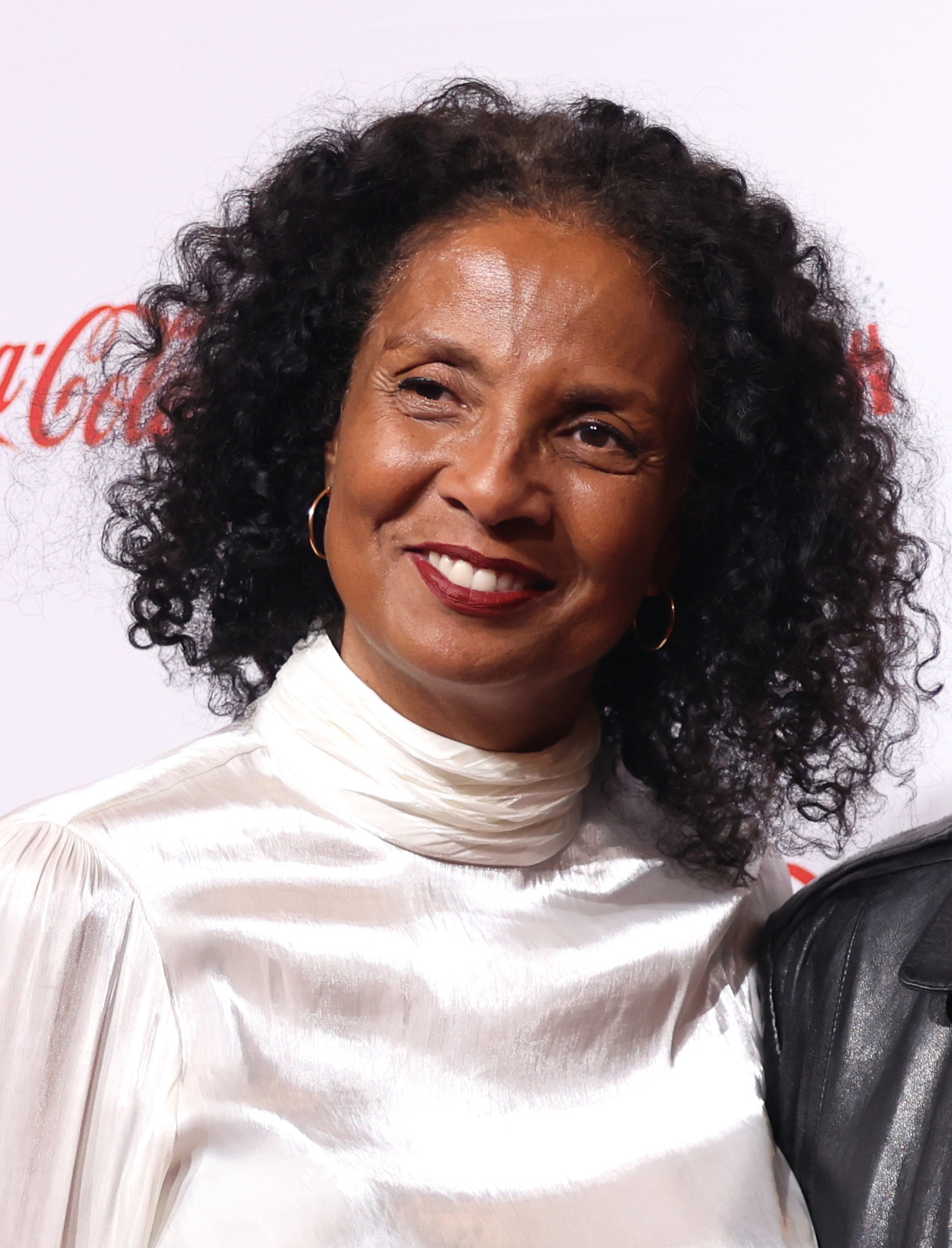
- Chong in 2025
- Born: Robbi Lynn Chong; May 28, 1965 (age 61); Vancouver, British Columbia, Canada
- Other name: Robby Chong
- Occupation: Actress
- Years active: 1983–2007; 2015

Robbi Lynn Chong (born May 28, 1965) is a Canadian actress and former model.

== Early life ==
Chong was born on May 28, 1965, in Vancouver, British Columbia, the second daughter of Maxine Sneed and Tommy Chong, an actor, comedian, director and writer. Both parents are biracial: her mother is of Black Canadian and Cherokee descent and her father is half Scotch-Irish, French and half Chinese. Her sister Rae Dawn Chong is also an actress. They have three younger half-brothers (including one who is adopted) and a half-sister from their father's second marriage.

== Career ==
Robbi Chong studied acting in Los Angeles, California for two years and began appearing frequently on stage and television, working full-time. She was an international cover girl who joined the Click Modeling Agency at age 19 and modeled in Paris from 1983 to 1988.

== Filmography ==
=== Films ===
- Cheech & Chong's The Corsican Brothers (1984) as Princess III
- Sécurité publique (1987) as Suzannah
- Far Out Man (1990) as Dancer
- The Evil Inside Me (1993) as Bobbie
- Jimmy Hollywood (1994) as Casting Secretary
- Ellie Parker (2005) as Acting Student
- Shelter (2007) as Receptionist
- Only God Can (2015) as Patrice

==== As producer ====
- Cheech & Chong's Last Movie (2024)

=== TV series ===
- The Cosby Show (1988) as Doctor
- You Bet Your Life (1992)
- Dave's World (1995)
- Murder One (1995) as Reporter #4
- Poltergeist: The Legacy (1996–1999) as Alexandra Moreau
- The Outer Limits (1999, Episode: "Blank Slate") as Hope Wilson
- The Outer Limits (1999, Episode: "Star Crossed") as Teresita Arboleda
- Red Shoe Diaries 12: Girl on a Bike (2000) (segment "Written Word")
- ER (2006) as Sonya Ames
