= Cheech & Chong's The Corsican Brothers =

- Theatrical release poster
- Directed by: Tommy Chong
- Written by: Cheech Marin; Tommy Chong
- Based on: The Corsican Brothers by Alexandre Dumas
- Produced by: Peter MacGregor-Scott
- Starring: Cheech Marin; Tommy Chong
- Cinematography: Harvey Harrison
- Music by: George S. Clinton
- Distributed by: Orion Pictures
- Release date: July 27, 1984
- Running time: 82 min.
- Country: United States
- Language: English
- Box office: $3,772,785

Cheech & Chong's The Corsican Brothers is a 1984 American film, the sixth feature-length film starring the comedy duo Cheech & Chong. Cheech Marin and Tommy Chong star as the two twin brothers in a parody of various film adaptations of the 1844 Alexandre Dumas novella, The Corsican Brothers.

To date, it is the last live-action film starring the duo, and the only one that does not heavily revolve around the normal elements of stoner comedy (being that there are very few references to marijuana). Instead the film elects to be a straightforward farce of swashbuckler films.

== Plot ==
Los Guys, a rockabilly band, has developed a racket playing loud music on the streets of France and accepting payment for them to stop playing. While at a nearby restaurant counting the proceeds from their latest "gig," two lead band members meet a gypsy storyteller. She tells them the story of The Corsican Brothers.

The story begins with the birth of two superfecund twin brothers, Louis and Lucien (played by adult Cheech and Chong as babies, children and adults), each by a different aristocratic French father. When they are first seen by their mother, she runs away screaming. The two fathers then end up dead in a botched duel over their partner's infidelity, leaving the twins to be raised as orphans. As toddlers in high chairs, their trait of only feeling pain from each other's injuries becomes apparent when they begin hitting each other during a food dispute: ”a bond of sympathy so extraordinary that each could feel the joy or pain of the other in his place.” This trait becomes the film's predominant running gag and an ongoing source of plot twists. Later, the brothers accidentally burn down their house and they decide to split up.

At age 30, they reunite: Louis (now Luís) wound up in Mexico working low-end jobs (though he claims to be a wealthy businessman) and Lucien, who stayed in France, has grown resentful of the royals' harsh treatment of peasants in the country, particularly that of the queen's regent, the sadistic (in more ways than one) Fuckaire, who usurped the king after his disappearance. The cowardly Luís is reluctant to help his brother's revolutionary plans, but both find themselves drawn to two of the queen's daughters (played by Cheech and Chong's real-life wives). The crux of Lucien's scheme is to disguise themselves respectively as a gay Spaniard hairdresser and Nostradamus, who are prepared to visit the queen with the Marquis du Hickey. Despite a setback in which they are temporarily imprisoned because Lucien would rather fight outnumbered than flee from danger as Luís wanted, Lucien manages to escape. At Luís's execution, Lucien and the peasants storm the festivities, Luís is freed and Fuckaire is deposed. As Luís prepares for the dual wedding between the brothers and princesses, he suddenly fears for their future, and Lucien sweeps in to rescue him as they both leave the princesses at the altar, resolved to cross the globe and start a revolution in America.

After their saga concludes, Los Guys resume playing in an outdoor cafe, covering Chuck Berry's "Nadine," to an indifferent audience.

Much of the film's humor comes from anachronisms: The Corsican Brothers is set in the 1840s (in the film it is portrayed closer to 18th-century, pre-revolution France), but Nostradamus, who lived and died three centuries prior, makes an appearance, and Luís is said to have spent time in a modern-day Mexico.

== Cast ==
- Cheech Marin as Luis Corsican
- Tommy Chong as Lucian Corsican
- Roy Dotrice as The Evil Fuckaire/Ye Old Jailer
- Shelby Chong as Princess I
- Rikki Marin (Cheech's real-life wife) as Princess II
- Edie McClurg as The Queen
- Robbi Chong as Princess III
- Jean-Claude Dreyfus as Marquis Du Hickey
- Rae Dawn Chong as The Gypsy
- Kay Dotrice as The Midwife
- Jennie C. Kos as The Pregnant Mother
- Martin Pepper as Martin
- Yvan Chiffre as Tax Collector #1
- Dan Schwarz as Tax Collector #2
- Serge Fedoroff as Nostrodamus
- Pierre Olaf as Courtier

== Reception ==
Leonard Maltin said the film was "Staggeringly unfunny even by C&C standards; the previews for Start the Revolution Without Me have more laughs."
