= C. Thomas Howell =

American actor (born 1966)

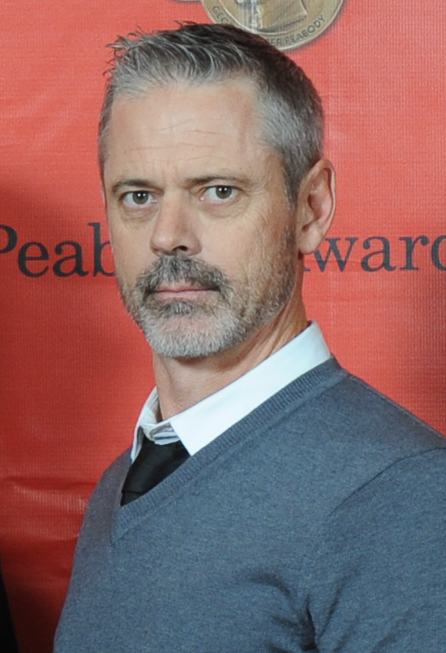
- Howell at the 2013 Peabody Awards
- Born: Christopher Thomas Howell; December 7, 1966 (age 59); Los Angeles, California, U.S.
- Other names: Tommy Howell; Tom Howell
- Occupations: Actor; director
- Years active: 1972–present
- Spouses: Rae Dawn Chong (m. 1989; div. 1990) Sylvie Anderson (m. 1992; div. 2016) Brandi Howell (m. 2023)
- Children: 3
- Relatives: Tommy Chong (former father-in-law)

Christopher Thomas Howell (born December 7, 1966) is an American actor, director and musician. After making his film debut with a supporting role in E.T. the Extra-Terrestrial (1982), Howell had his breakout with a lead role as Ponyboy Curtis in the coming-of-age film The Outsiders (1983).

Following his breakout, Howell had starring roles in the films Tank (1984), Grandview, U.S.A. (1984), Red Dawn (1984), Secret Admirer (1985), and The Hitcher (1986). He also starred in the commercially successful yet controversial film Soul Man (1986).

In the 1990s, Howell starred in the films Side Out (1990), That Night (1992), and Gettysburg (1993), and had main roles as Detective Frank Kohanek on the Fox horror television series Kindred: The Embraced (1996) and Dr. Alex Kennedy on the syndicated series Amazon (1999–2000). He portrayed Baby Face Nelson in the biographical film Baby Face Nelson (1995). In the 2000s, Howell starred in the film Gods and Generals (2003) and had a recurring, later main, role as Bill "Dewey" Dudek on the NBC and TNT crime drama series Southland (2009–2013). He had a supporting role in the film Hidalgo (2004).

In the 2010s, Howell starred in the films Woodlawn (2015) and A Question of Faith (2017), and had a supporting role in the superhero film The Amazing Spider-Man (2012). He had voice roles in the superhero animated films Justice League: The Flashpoint Paradox (2013), Justice League: Gods and Monsters (2015), and Suicide Squad: Hell to Pay (2018). Howell also portrayed Walter Jenkins in the political drama film LBJ (2016). In the 2020s, Howell had a main role as Hagerty on the Netflix series Obliterated (2023) and portrayed Caspar Weinberger in the biographical film Reagan (2024).

In addition to his acting career, Howell began pursuing music professionally in the 2020s under the name Tommy Howell. He released his debut single, "Rose Hill," in 2022, followed by "Whiskey Demon," and later issued his first full-length album American Storyteller in 2023.

== Early life ==
Howell was born in the Van Nuys neighborhood of Los Angeles to Christopher N. and Candice Howell. He has three siblings.

His father worked as a stunt coordinator and rodeo performer. He played the role of the Red Knight in Terry Gilliam’s The Fisher King. As a young boy, Howell wanted to be a stuntman and was a child stunt performer. He was also a rodeo star.

When Howell was young, his parents divorced. Howell graduated from Saugus High School in 1984.

== Career ==
Howell made his show business debut in the situation comedy The Brian Keith Show. When he was older, he acted in commercials.

=== 1980s ===
In 1982, Howell made his film debut as Tyler in Steven Spielberg's E.T. the Extra-Terrestrial.

In 1981, aged 15, Howell was cast in The Outsiders, Francis Ford Coppola's 1983 cinematic adaptation of S. E. Hinton's novel. Howell played the lead role of Ponyboy Curtis, "the soulful tagalong greaser through whose eyes we see the events of the 1960s-set film unfold." The coming-of-age film went on to become a cult classic, and featured an ensemble cast that included Tom Cruise, Matt Dillon, Emilio Estevez, Leif Garrett, Diane Lane, Rob Lowe, Ralph Macchio, and Patrick Swayze. Howell's portrayal of Ponyboy was his breakthrough role, and it earned him a Young Artist Award.

In 1984, Howell and his Outsiders co-star Swayze reunited for Grandview, U.S.A. and Red Dawn, Howell also had a pivotal role in Tank. In 1985, he starred in Secret Admirer. After filming The Outsiders, Howell co-starred in his own television series Two Marriages, which ended after four episodes, but letters of support got it back on air. He later expressed disappointment in the series.

Howell was one of two final actors in the running for the lead role of Marty McFly in Back to the Future (1985); the other was Eric Stoltz. Ultimately, Michael J. Fox was cast as Marty after Stoltz was deemed wrong for the part. In 1986, Howell was a hitchhiker's target in the horror film The Hitcher. He also starred in the 2003 sequel The Hitcher II: I've Been Waiting. In 1986, Howell starred in the satire Soul Man, a controversial film in which Howell's character appears in blackface. The film was widely condemned and while it was a box office success, it did not help Howell's career. Howell then played the young Arturo Toscanini in Franco Zeffirelli's 1988 film Young Toscanini alongside Elizabeth Taylor.

=== 1990s ===
In 1992, Howell starred in romantic drama That Night alongside Juliette Lewis. The film was based on the novel of the same name by Alice McDermott. In 1993, Howell starred with Linda Fiorentino and Nancy Allen in the thriller Acting on Impulse. He then achieved success in the film Gettysburg, which was popular with history buffs and history classrooms. In 1995, he starred as Mike, a motorcycle courier in the poorly received Mad Dogs and Englishmen with Elizabeth Hurley.

Following this, Howell starred in Payback and then played gangster Baby Face Nelson in the film of the same name. He starred in and made his directorial debut with the 1996 direct-to-video release Pure Danger, which also featured Teri Ann Linn and comic Carrot Top. In 1999, Howell played a doctor stranded on a deserted island after a plane crash in the television show Amazon.

=== 2000s ===
In 2004, he played serial killer Kenneth Bianchi in The Hillside Strangler. In 2005, he starred in H. G. Wells' War of the Worlds, one of three 2005 adaptations of the novel The War of the Worlds by H. G. Wells. Howell directed and starred in a straight-to-DVD sequel War of the Worlds 2: The Next Wave in 2008. Also in 2005, he reunited with his Secret Admirer co-star Lori Loughlin when he had a recurring role on her television show Summerland as Zac Efron's father. Howell appeared as a doctor in The Poseidon Adventure, an adaptation of the 1972 film of the same name. His father's first (uncredited) stunt co-ordination was for the original film.

In 2006, Howell starred in Hoboken Hollow. He also became a supporter of the production company The Asylum, which produced his straight-to-DVD films. In 2008, Howell directed and starred in The Day the Earth Stopped, a mockbuster intended to capitalize on The Day the Earth Stood Still.

Beginning in 2009, Howell guest starred in Criminal Minds on CBS as serial killer George Foyet (The Boston Reaper), a recurring villain based on The Boston Strangler. Also beginning in 2009, he played the role of Officer Bill "Dewey" Dudek, a police officer recovering from alcoholism, in the L.A. police drama Southland.

=== 2010s and 2020s ===
In 2011, Howell guest starred as an inmate on The Glades and in Torchwood: Miracle Day.

Howell appeared in the 2012 film The Amazing Spider-Man.

Starting in 2015, Howell has had a recurring role as Dr. Daniel Stinger in the Freeform show Stitchers. In 2017, he had a recurring role as Ash Spenser, a retired Navy SEAL, in the CBS show SEAL Team.

In 2016 and 2018, Howell had a recurring guest-star role as Paul Belmont, a United States Navy Lieutenant Commander at Camp Pendleton, in seasons 1 and 3 of Animal Kingdom.

In 2023, Howell starred in Obliterated on Netflix as Harry Haggerty.

== Personal life ==
In the 1980s, Howell dated actress Kyle Richards. In 1989, he married actress Rae Dawn Chong, whom he met while co-starring with her in the 1986 film Soul Man. They divorced the following year. Howell married his second wife, Sylvie Anderson, in 1992, and the couple had three children. Anderson filed for divorce in 2016.

In November 2001, Howell was acquitted of five misdemeanor charges, including hit and run and brandishing a weapon arising out of a confrontation with a skateboarder in Southern California.

== Filmography ==
=== Film ===
Year	Title	Role	Notes
1982	E.T. the Extra-Terrestrial	Tyler	Credited as Tom Howell
1983	The Outsiders	Ponyboy Curtis	
1984	Tank	Billy	
1984	Grandview, U.S.A.	Tim Pearson	
1984	Red Dawn	Robert Morris	
1985	Secret Admirer	Michael Ryan	
1986	The Hitcher	Jim Halsey	
1986	Soul Man	Mark Watson	
1987	A Tiger's Tale	Bubber Drumm	
1988	Young Toscanini	Arturo Toscanini	
1989	The Return of the Musketeers	Raoul	
1990	Far Out Man	Himself	
1990	Side Out	Monroe Clark	
1990	Kid	Kid	
1991	Nickel & Dime	Jack Stone	
1992	Breaking the Rules	Gene Michaels	
1992	That Night	Rick	
1992	To Protect and Serve	Egan	
1993	Gettysburg	Thomas Chamberlain	
1993	Treacherous	Micky Stewart	
1994	Jailbait	Sergeant Lee Teffler	Direct-to-video
1994	Teresa's Tattoo	Carl	
1995	Payback	Oscar Bonsetter	
1995	Dangerous Indiscretion	Jim	
1995	Mad Dogs and Englishmen	Mike	
1995	Hourglass	Michael Jardine	Direct-to-video
1995	Baby Face Nelson	Baby Face Nelson	Direct-to-video
1996	The Sweeper	Mark Goddard	Direct-to-video
1996	Pure Danger	Johnie Dean	Direct-to-video; also director
1997	The Big Fall	Blaise Rybeck	Direct-to-video; also director
1997	Laws of Deception	Evan Marino	
1997	Last Lives	Aaron	
1997	Sleeping Dogs	Sanchez Boon	Direct-to-video
1997	Dilemma	Thomas "Quin" Quinlan	
1997	Matter of Trust	Michael D'Angelo	
1998	Shepherd	Boris Dakota	
1998	Charades	Evan	
1998	Fatal Affair	Malcolm "Mack" Maddox	
1999	The Glass Jar	Lanois	
1999	Avalanche	Jack	
1999	Hitman's Run	Tom Holly	
1999	The Prince and the Surfer	Dean	Direct-to-video
1999	Enemy Action	John Reed	
1999	The Crimson Code	J.B. Gaines	
2000	The Million Dollar Kid	Valentino	
2000	Hot Boyz	Officer Roberts	Direct-to-video
2001	XCU: Extreme Close Up	Geoffrey Liddy	
2001	Separate Ways	Tom Milton	
2001	Asylum Days	Nathan Devine	
2001	Askari	Joss McKinley	
2002	WillFull	Nat Wolff	
2003	Net Games	Adam Vance	
2003	Gods and Generals	Thomas Chamberlain	
2003	The Hitcher II: I've Been Waiting	Jim Halsey	Direct-to-video
2004	Hidalgo	Preston Webb	
2004	Nursie	Zack	
2004	The Hillside Strangler	Kenneth Bianchi	
2004	A Killer Within	Addison Terrill	
2004	The Lost Angel	Kuratha	
2005	Glass Trap	Curtis	Direct-to-video
2005	The Keeper: The Legend of Omar Khayyam	Coach Fielding	
2006	Hoboken Hollow	Clayton Connelly	Direct-to-video
2006	The Da Vinci Treasure	Michael Archer	Direct-to-video
2006	The Far Side of Jericho	"Little Jimmy" Thornton	
2007	The Haunting of Marsten Manor	Captain Williams	
2007	Fighting Words	David Settles	
2007	The Stolen Moments of September	Sisner	
2007	Dead Letters	KC	
2008	House of Fallen	Thomas	
2008	Big Game	Cody "Sully" Sullivan	
2008	Toxic	Joe	Direct-to-video
2008	The Thirst: Blood War	Jed	
2008	The Day the Earth Stopped	Josh Myron	Direct-to-video; also director
2008	Mutant Vampire Zombies from the Hood!	David	
2008	The Grind	Luke	
2009	The Jailhouse	Seth Delray	
2009	The Land That Time Forgot	Frost Michaels	Direct-to-video; also director
2009	American Pie Presents: The Book of Love	Alumnus Guy #2	Direct-to-video
2009	Secret at Arrow Lake	Daniel	
2009	Fuel	Shane	
2009	Camouflage	Stanley	
2010	Street Poet	David	
2010	The Terror Experiment	Chief Grasso	
2010	Flatline	Teacher	
2010	Cupid's Arrow	Professor Grimes	
2011	Restitution	John Youngstown	
2012	Wedding Day	Russ	
2012	Commander and Chief	Shrub	
2012	The Amazing Spider-Man	Troy	
2012	Chilly Christmas	Patrick Cole	Direct-to-video
2012	MoniKa	Double	
2012	Escape	Paul Jordan	Direct-to-video
2013	Don't Pass Me By	Jack	
2013	The Devil's Dozen	Tom	
2013	Lost on Purpose	Delbert Fergeson	
2013	Justice League: The Flashpoint Paradox	Eobard Thawne / Professor Zoom	Voice; direct-to-video
2013	Storm Rider	Mitch	
2014	Confessions of a Womanizer	Tony	
2014	Bigfoot Wars	Zeke	
2014	A Magic Christmas	Jack Carter	
2014	Borrowed Moments	Jack	
2015	Spirit Riders	Keith	
2015	Rivers 9	Sheriff Quentin	
2015	Justice League: Gods and Monsters	Will Magnus	Voice; direct-to-video
2015	Woodlawn	Coach George "Shorty" White	
2015	A Christmas Eve Miracle	Jack Carter	
2015	Magic Hour	Tom Worthy	
2015	Lazarus Rising	Silent Cal	
2016	Blood Lust	Ryan	
2016	Attack of the Killer Donuts	Officer Rogers	
2016	LBJ	Walter Jenkins	
2016	Sick People	Dr. Sam Zimmerman	
2017	The Shadow People	Kaine	
2017	Disconnected	Robert Crawford	
2017	A Question of Faith	John Danielson	
2018	Suicide Squad: Hell to Pay	Eobard Thawne / Professor Zoom	Voice; direct-to-video
2018	Dirty Dealing 3D	Carter	
2018	The Rack Pack	Ted	
2018	Shifting Gears	Jenkins	
2018	My B.F.F.	Ben Wilkens	
2019	Dauntless: The Battle of Midway	Miles Browning	Direct-to-video
2019	Rich Boy, Rich Girl	Blake	
2020	Beast Mode	Breen Nash	
2023	Old Dads	Ed Cameron	
2023	Crimson Point	Frank	
2024	Ride	John Hawkins	
2024	Reagan	Caspar Weinberger	
2026	One Mile	Stanley Dixon	Direct-to-video

=== Television ===
Year	Title	Role	Notes
1972–1974	The Brian Keith Show	Unknown	Unknown episodes
1983	Two Marriages	Scott Morgan	Episode: "Relativity"
1985–1986	Moonlighting	Waiter / Postal Worker	2 episodes
1989	Nightmare Classics	Jenner Brading	Episode: "The Eyes of the Panther"
1990	Curiosity Kills	Cat Thomas	Television film
1992	Tattle Tale	Bernard Sprat	Television film
1993	Acting on Impulse	Paul Stevens	Television film
1994	Natural Selection	Ben Braden / Alex Connelly	Television film
1995	Suspect Device	Dan Jerico	Television film
1996	Kindred: The Embraced	Frank Kohanek	8 episodes
1997	Dead Fire	Tucker	Television film
1998	Sealed with a Kiss	Detective Mick Cullen	Television film
1998	The Outer Limits	Captain Miles Davidlow	Episode: "The Joining"
1998	V.I.P.	Phil Sherman	Episode: "Val Got Game"
1998	Love Boat: The Next Wave	John	Episode: "Affairs to Remember"
1999	Dead Man's Gun	Henry Hubble	Episode: "The Phrenologist"
1999–2000	Amazon	Dr. Alex Kennedy	22 episodes
2000	Twice in a Lifetime	Tony	Episode: "The Escaped Artist"
2000	Lawless: Dead Evidence	Dean Riley	Television film
2002	Son of the Beach	Jason Dudikoff	Episode: "In the Line of Booty"
2002	Night of the Wolf	Sheriff Wade Messer	Television film
2002	Killer Bees!	Sheriff Lyndon Harris	Television film
2004	The District	Chris Gunner	Episode: "On Guard"
2004	Zolar	Hedion	Television film
2004–2005	Summerland	Kyle Bale	2 episodes
2005	Crimson Force	Captain Baskin	Television film
2005	Ordinary Miracles	Jim Powell	Television film
2005	H. G. Wells' War of the Worlds	George Herbert	Television film
2005	The Poseidon Adventure	Doctor Matthew Ballard	Television film
2005	ER	Vincent Janeson	Episode: "The Human Shield"
2006	24	Barry Landes	2 episodes
2008	Celebracadabra	Himself	Contestant
2008	Xenophobia	Stone	Television film
2008	A Gunfighter's Pledge	Horn	Television film
2008	War of the Worlds 2: The Next Wave	George Herbert	Television film; also director
2009–2013	Southland	Bill "Dewey" Dudek	27 episodes
2009–2020	Criminal Minds	George Foyet / The Boston Reaper	6 episodes
2010	Psych	Agent Camden Driggs	Episode: "One, Maybe Two, Ways Out"
2011	The Glades	Peyton Robinson	Episode: "Second Skin"
2011	Torchwood: Miracle Day	The Gentleman	Episode: "Escape to L.A."
2011	CHAOS	Carson Simms	Episode: "Proof of Life"
2011	Camel Spiders	Sheriff Ken Beaumont	Television film
2012	Alphas	Eli Aquino	Episode: "The Quick and the Dead"
2012	Revolution	Bounty Hunter	Episode: "Chained Heat"
2012	Castle	John Campbell	Episode: "Swan Song"
2012	Longmire	Ray Stewart	Episode: "A Damn Shame"
2012	Hawaii Five-0	Martin Cordova	Episode: "Death Wish"
2012	Home Invasion	Ray	Television film
2013	Horror Haiku	John Asher	Episode: "I Know What You Know"
2013	Sons of Anarchy	Agent Frank Eagan	Episode: "One One Six"
2013	Blue Bloods	Alex Polanski	Episode: "Justice Served"
2013	An Amish Murder	Nathan Detrick	Television film
2013	Christmas Belle	Rex Everhart	Television film
2014	Grimm	Agent Weston Steward	5 episodes
2014	Category 5	Charlie DuPuis	Television film
2014–2015	Girlfriends' Guide to Divorce	Nate	4 episodes
2015	Motive	Joe Hillis	Episode: "Reversal of Fortune"
2015	Ties That Bind	Mr. Witherspoon	Episode: "Controlled Substance"
2015	Sleepy Hollow	Agent Mick Granger	Episode: "I, Witness"
2015–2017	Stitchers	Daniel Stinger	7 episodes
2016	Advance & Retreat	Nathan Shapiro	Television film
2016–2018	Animal Kingdom	Paul Belmont	9 episodes
2017	Ray Donovan	Dr. Brogan	4 episodes
2017	Outcast	Simon Barnes	3 episodes
2017	The Punisher	Carson Wolf	3 episodes
2017–2021	SEAL Team	Ash Spenser	5 episodes
2018	The Blacklist	Earl Fagen	2 episodes
2018	MacGyver	Vasil	Episode: "Guts + Fuel + Hope"
2018	Dynasty	Max Van Kirk	2 episodes
2018	The Good Cop	Chuck Everett	Episode: "Why Kill A Busboy?"
2018–2021	The Walking Dead	Roy	6 episodes
2019	Bosch	Louis Degner	2 episodes
2019	The Terror	Major Bowen	4 episodes
2021	Creepshow	Samuel Spinster	Episode: "Dead and Breakfast/Pesticide "
2023	Will Trent	Warden Sturgill Hardly	Episode: "It's The Work I Signed Up For"
2023	Obliterated	Harry Haggerty	8 episodes
2025	1923	Anders	3 episodes
2026	The Lowdown	Shorty Henderson	Season 2, Episode 7 ("Hot Weeners!")

=== Video games ===
Year	Title	Voice role
2017	Injustice 2	Leonard Snart / Captain Cold
2018	Lego DC Super-Villains	Eobard Thawne / Reverse-Flash

== Discography ==
=== Singles ===
Year	Title	Album
2022	"Rose Hill"	Non-album single
2022	"Whiskey Demon"	Non-album single
2022	"Ponygirl"	Non-album single

=== Albums ===
Year	Title
2023	American Storyteller
