= Elizabeth Berridge (actress) =

American film and theatre actress

- Born: May 2, 1962 (age 64); New Rochelle, New York, U.S.
- Occupation: Actress
- Years active: 1979–present
- Spouse: Kevin Corrigan (m. 2001)
- Children: 1
- Website: elizabethberridge.net

Elizabeth Berridge (born May 2, 1962) is an American film and theatre actress. She is best known for playing Constanze Mozart in the Miloš Forman period drama film Amadeus (1984), Melanie in Five Corners (1987), and for her comedic roles as Charlotte on the Norman Lear sitcom The Powers That Be (1992–1993), and Officer Eve Eggers on The John Larroquette Show (1993–1996).

== Early life ==
Berridge was born in New Rochelle, New York, the daughter of George Berridge, a lawyer, and Mary L. Berridge (née Robinson), a social worker. The family settled in Larchmont, New York, where she attended Chatsworth Elementary School. There she began to perform and sing. At 15, she began studying at the Lee Strasberg Theatre and Film Institute, and with renowned acting teacher Warren Robertson. Due to her acting commitments, she earned her diploma through an independent-study program at Mamaroneck High School.

== Career ==
Berridge was called to audition for the part of Mozart's wife Constanze after filming had already commenced in Prague on Amadeus. Meg Tilly, who was originally cast, injured her leg in a soccer game, forcing her to withdraw from the film. Two actresses were flown to Prague, and after a week's auditions Berridge was given the part (she recalled that Milos Forman declared, in jest, that the other actress, Diane Franklin, was "too pretty" to play the part of a landlady's daughter). Berridge and the other cast members remained in Prague for six months to complete filming.

Her other film roles include co-starring as glue-sniffing Melanie alongside Jodie Foster, John Turturro, and Tim Robbins in Five Corners, directed by Tony Bill and written by John Patrick Shanley, and as Laura Dern's sister June in Smooth Talk (1985), directed by Joyce Chopra and based on a short story by Joyce Carol Oates.

Berridge has also had a prolific career on stage. She won the 1989 Dramalogue Award and was nominated for a San Diego Critics Circle Award for playing the title role in Frank Wedekind's Lulu at the La Jolla Playhouse opposite Harris Yulin. Off-Broadway, she was nominated for Drama Desk Awards for Best Featured Actress for her roles in Kevin Wade’s Cruse Control, directed by Norman Rene, and Bill C. Davis's Wrestlers, directed by the late Geraldine Fitzgerald. In London, she starred in Butterfly Kiss at the Almeida Theatre. She is a member of the Actors Studio and the Ensemble Studio Theatre.

On TV, in addition to her series regular roles on Norman Lear's The Powers that Be (1992–1993) and The John Larroquette Show (1993–1996), Berridge guest-starred on several primetime series including Miami Vice, The Equalizer, and in a recurring role on Grounded For Life In made-for-TV movies, she had major supporting roles in Larry McMurtry's Montana (1990), Silence of the Heart (1984) with Charlie Sheen, and Home Fires Burning (1989), with Bill Pullman and Neil Patrick Harris.

Berridge was the executive producer on her daughter Sadie Bones' first feature film, If That Mockingbird Don't Sing (2024), which won numerous awards internationally on the film festival circuit and was picked up for distribution by Tribeca Films/Giant Pictures.

== Personal life ==
Berridge met actor Kevin Corrigan when they worked together on the film Broke Even (2000). They married in 2001 and have a daughter, Sadie, a writer and director.

== Filmography ==
=== Film ===
Elizabeth Berridge film credits
Year	Title	Role	Notes
1979	Natural Enemies	Sheila Steward	
1981	The Funhouse	Amy Harper	
1984	Amadeus	Constanze Mozart	
1985	Smooth Talk	June	
1987	Five Corners	Melanie	
1993	When the Party's Over	Frankie	
1999	Payback	Hooker	uncredited
2000	Broke Even	Leslie	
2004	Hidalgo	Annie Oakley	
2010	Please Give	Elyse	
2015	Results	Christine	
2022	The Vanishing Point	Lori	Short film

=== Television ===
Elizabeth Berridge television credits
Year	Title	Role	Notes
1981	Guiding Light	Morgan Richards	Soap opera, episode: "Surprise Witness"
1981–82	Texas	Allison Linden	Soap opera, recurring role
1984	Silence of the Heart	Penny	TV movie
1987	Leg Work	Peaches	Episode: "Peaches"
1989	Home Fires Burning	Francine Tibbetts	TV movie
1989	Miami Vice	Julia Scianti	Episode: "The Lost Madonna"
1989	The Equalizer	Susan Wilhite	Episode: "Endgame"
1990	Montana	Lavetta	TV movie
1992–93	The Powers That Be	Charlotte	Main cast
1993–96	The John Larroquette Show	Officer Eve Eggers	Main cast
1998	Touched by an Angel	Holly	Episode: "The Trigger"
2001	When Billie Beat Bobby	Rosie Casals	TV movie
2001–05	Grounded for Life	Amy	3 episodes
2003	Still Standing	Sandy Hartwick	Episode: "Still Changing"
