= Things Are Tough All Over =

1982 film by Thomas K. Avildsen

- Theatrical release poster
- Directed by: Thomas K. Avildsen
- Written by: Tommy Chong; Cheech Marin
- Produced by: Howard Brown
- Starring: Cheech Marin; Tommy Chong
- Cinematography: Bobby Byrne
- Edited by: Dennis Dolan
- Music by: Gaye Delorme
- Distributed by: Columbia Pictures
- Release date: August 6, 1982
- Running time: 90 minutes
- Country: United States
- Language: English
- Budget: $7 million
- Box office: $21 million

Things Are Tough All Over is a 1982 American action stoner comedy film directed by Thomas K. Avildsen and starring Tommy Chong and Cheech Marin as two aging hippies, and additionally as Arab businessmen Mr. Slyman and Prince Habib.

The film is initially set in Chicago, where two impoverished musicians are working for a duo of Arab businessmen. Their employers want to transport illegally-obtained money to Las Vegas, so they hide it in a limousine. They arrange for the musicians to drive the limousine to Vegas, without informing them of the actual nature of their mission. Since the employers did not provide them with travel expenses, the musicians sell parts of the car. After delivering the car, they wander in the deserts of Nevada on foot. Their employers are searching for them to kill them.

== Plot ==
Cheech and Chong are driving a limo through the desert. Chong, who has decided to stop doing drugs for a while, is talking about rock and roll, and Cheech is falling asleep, but Cheech is narrating over what is happening. He says that "things are tough all over" and that he is going to tell their story.

It's an awful winter in Chicago, and Cheech and Chong are poor, struggling musicians working at a car wash owned by a pair of oil-rich Arabs, Mr. Slyman and Prince Habib. After messing up on the job, the 2 are forced by the Arabs to work and play music at their club. Cheech and Chong also try to get with the Arabs' French girlfriends, who are more in love with the stoners.

The Arabs find themselves with a large sum of illegal money, which they try to get to their other business in Las Vegas. They decide to stash all the money in the seats of a limousine. The Arabs hire the stoners to drive the limousine to Las Vegas, telling them that they're sending them on a "rock tour."

Cheech and Chong at first get gas in Chicago, but when they reveal they're strapped for cash, the man at the gas station takes a piece of the car as payment. With that idea, Cheech and Chong find themselves driving across the country, selling parts and pieces of the car for gas, food, and supplies. Soon, their car becomes a wreck and looks messed up, but Cheech and Chong continue to sell parts to get by. While out in the middle of the deserts, they decide to pick up a hitchhiker, who turns out to be none other than Donna, Cheech's girlfriend. The two decide to take Donna in their messed-up limo to the nearest gas station. However, Donna is traveling with dozens of Mexicans, so the stoners end up driving all the Mexicans and Donna to the nearest gas station. To pay for gas, Cheech and Chong give the old man that runs the place a chair from the limo—which unbeknownst to them the Arab's have hidden money for safe transport on the bottom of the car seat.

Cheech and Chong deliver the messed-up limousine to the Arabs' other oil plant in the desert, to find no one there. With no other transportation or money, Cheech and Chong set out on foot into the desert. They wander into the burning deserts, suffering the Nevada heat, and trying to get cars to stop- they remain unsuccessful. Eating peyote to survive and singing to pass the time, Cheech and Chong do their best to get through the desert, though they believe they'll die from the heat.

Back in Chicago, the Arabs find out that Cheech and Chong have delivered what remains of the car without any money in it. After deciding to kill them, the Arabs fly out to Nevada in their private plane and set out by car into the desert. The Arabs meet the old man at the gas station and learn that Cheech and Chong have been around, and set out into the deserts; their car breaks down, leaving the Arabs to wander through the Nevada deserts and get lost. Meanwhile, while walking through the desert, Cheech and Chong are picked up by the Arab's French girlfriends, who take them to an abandoned motel in the middle of the desert. The French girlfriends have sex with the stoners, and are (unknown to them) on a hidden camera film. Afterwards, the French ladies leave in their car, leaving the stoners stranded in the middle of nowhere yet again. Meanwhile, the Arabs are having the same problem, looking for Cheech and Chong in the middle of the desert, having no idea where to go.

Cheech and Chong wander through the desert again until they're picked up again, this time by comedian Rip Taylor, whose puns and props make Chong cry. The comedian drives the two into Las Vegas and drops them off at a restaurant, and has them dressed up as women to cover up their rags. Cheech and Chong start to dine at the restaurant, before the Arabs show up for dinner as well, having escaped the desert. Before they can eat, all the peyote Chong consumed begins to mess with his mind. Chong becomes emotional and confused, and when the Arabs begin to notice, the stoners try to escape. However, their wigs fall off, and the Arabs realize it's Cheech and Chong. The Arabs chase the stoners out of the restaurant and through the streets of Vegas. Cheech and Chong run into a women's-only porno theater with the murder-happy Arabs on their tail. In the theater, the Arabs see the showing of the hidden camera film of the stoners having sex with the Arabs' girlfriends. While the Arabs watch, inspired, Cheech and Chong escape. The stoners ditch the women's clothes and set out on foot to leave Las Vegas. The next day, as Cheech and Chong walk out of the city, a car pulls up, and Cheech and Chong get in, to find the Arabs and their French girlfriends. At first, Cheech and Chong are terrified and try to escape, but Mr. Slyman reveals that, instead of killing them, the Arabs have decided to cast the duo in porn films and launder the money through the enterprise.

A happy ending, with a narrating Cheech reminding us that "hey, things are tough all over."

== Cast ==
- Cheech Marin as Cheech and Mr. Slyman
- Tommy Chong as Chong and Prince Habib
- Evelyn Guerrero as Donna
- John Steadman as Old Timer
- George Wallace as The Champ
- Toni Attell as Cocktail Waitress
- Mike Bacarella as Cop in Laundromat
- Dorothea Neumann as Mom
- Billy Beck as Pop
- Senta Moses as Kid in Laundromat
- Don Bovingloh as Maitre D'
- Richard "Moon" Calhoun as Drummer
- Jennifer Condos as Bass Player
- John Corronna as St. Louis Biker
- Aaron Freeman as Cop in Ghetto
- Mike Friedman as Car Rental Agent
- Maya Harman as Belly Dancer
- Vanaghan S. Housepian as Henchman
- Ben Powers as The Pimp
- Garth Shaw as Tourist
- Rip Taylor
- Dave Coulier
- Ruby Wax
- Rikki Marin
- Shelby Chong

== Reception ==
Janet Maslin of The New York Times wrote, "Cheech and Chong have a good time in 'Things Are Tough All Over,' and you will, too." Variety called the film "a painful and pallid affair which reminds of the tired, late-career efforts of Abbott & Costello." Gene Siskel of the Chicago Tribune gave the film one-and-a-half stars out of four and called it "the fourth and possibly worst Cheech and Chong comedy film." Gary Arnold of The Washington Post wrote, "'Things Are Tough All Over' proves a prophetic bad-luck title for Cheech & Chong, who slump into the sporadically amusing doldrums for the first time in their brief but hilarious career as outrageous movie clowns." David Ansen of Newsweek called it "a shaggy-dog road movie, with all the team's usual ingredients but one — it's not funny."
