= Darren Dalton =

American actor, writer (born 1965)

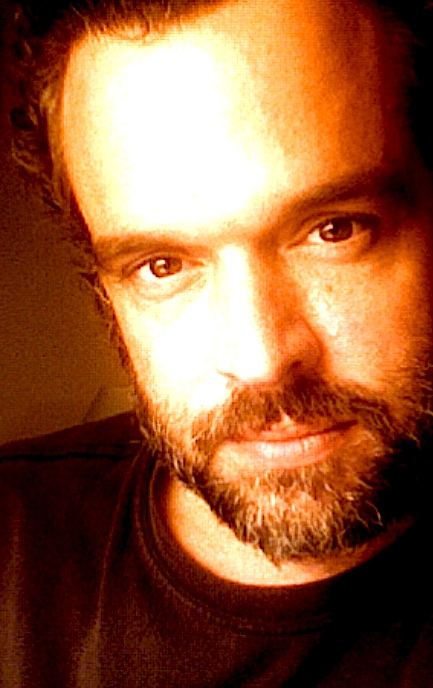
- Born: Darren Jack Dalton; February 9, 1965 (age 61); Powell, Wyoming, United States
- Occupations: Film, television actor, writer
- Years active: 1983–present
- Spouse: Kristen Dalton (m. 1993; div. 2009)

Darren Jack Dalton (born February 9, 1965) is an American actor, screenwriter, and film producer. He is best known for playing Randy the Soc in The Outsiders (1983) and Daryl in Red Dawn (1984),

== Life and career ==
Dalton was born in Powell, Wyoming and raised in Worland, Wyoming. He spent a lot of his time at Big Trails Ranch outside Ten Sleep, where his grandparents raised cattle along the Nowood River. There, Dalton learned to cowboy, riding horses and exploring caves with what he imagined were conquistador inscriptions. The family moved to Albuquerque when he was 13 where Dalton discovered his high school offered a stagecraft elective.

When the drama department needed actors for smaller roles performing Shakespeare, he auditioned and got hooked.

Dalton's career began in 1982 when cast as Randy Anderson by Francis Ford Coppola during a nationwide talent search for the teen ensemble The Outsiders.

Dalton rejoined his The Outsiders co-stars C. Thomas Howell and Patrick Swayze in Red Dawn (1984), a story of a group of teenagers fighting Soviet Union troops who had invaded the United States. Dalton portrayed Daryl Bates, the son of the mayor.

After Red Dawn, Dalton's first made-for-television movie was Brotherhood of Justice (1986) as a rebellious teenager, and he appeared in the short-lived TV ensemble drama The Best Times (1985). He also had TV guest appearances in the late 1980s on Highway to Heaven, Quantum Leap, Alien Nation and as General Custer on Doctor Quinn, Medicine Woman. Shortly after, he returned to film, including in Dancing in the Forest (1989) and The Wolves (1996).

Turning to screenwriting full-time, Dalton did not appear in other TV shows or movies until 2007's The Stolen Moments of September. He then returned to acting in War of the Worlds 2, Children of the Hunt, Darkroom (which he also executive produced and provided music for), the 3-D zombie thriller Day of the Living and The Day the Earth Stopped which Dalton also wrote and produced, and The Land That Time Forgot, which Dalton adapted from the Edgar Rice Burroughs novel.

== Filmography ==
Year	Title	Role	Notes
1983	The Outsiders	Randy Anderson	
1984	National Lampoon's Joy of Sex	Ed Ingalls	
1984	Red Dawn	Daryl	
1986	Brotherhood of Justice	Scottie	TV movie
1987	Daddy	John Sparks	TV movie
1988	Freddy's Nightmares	Zach	Episode: "Freddy's Tricks and Treats"
1989	Dancing in the Forest	Sy	
1990	Montana	Jimbo	TV movie
1992	To Protect and Serve	Hall	
1994	Scanner Cop	Officer Longo	
1995	Hourglass	Pete the bartender / Dog Man	
1996	The Wolves	Blackie	
1996	Pure Danger	Cook	
1997	The Big Fall	Larry	
1997	Sleeping Dogs	Dexter	
2007	The Stolen Moments of September	Det. Scott Kawalski	
2008	Darkroom	Baron Bradley	
2008	War of the Worlds 2	Shackleford	
2008	The Day the Earth Stopped	Prewitt	
2009	The Jailhouse	Donnie	
2009	The Land That Time Forgot	Cole Stevens	
2009	Vault of Darkness	Malcolm	
2009	Children of the Hunt	Mayor Paulo	
2010	The Auctioneers	Tucson	
2012	The Cottage	Detective Martin	
