= The Jailhouse =

- Film poster
- Directed by: Billy Lewis
- Written by: Billy Lewis
- Produced by: Billy Lewis; Heath Franklin; Brandon Luck
- Starring: C. Thomas Howell; Lindsey McKeon; Darren Dalton; Rey Valentin; Siri Baruc; Sahr Ngaujah; Nate Panning; Mark Darby Robinson; Ken Aguilar; Madison Weidberg; Phillip Troy Linger; Keith Minor
- Cinematography: Joe Stauffer
- Edited by: Joe Stauffer
- Music by: Alex Beard
- Distributed by: American World Pictures, 3L Productions, Galvanized Films
- Release dates: May 1, 2009 (Cape Fear); May 4, 2010 (United States)
- Running time: 86 minutes
- Country: United States
- Language: English

The Jailhouse is a 2009 American psychological thriller film starring C. Thomas Howell, Lindsey McKeon, Rey Valentin and Darren Dalton. It was written and directed by Billy Lewis and produced by Brandon Luck and Heath Franklin. The film features a family moving into a house that used to be a jail when they discover it's haunted. The Jailhouse premiered on May 1, 2009 at the Cape Fear Independent Film Festival, was released in 16 theaters in 10 states beginning May 4, 2010. The Jailhouse made its world television premiere on the Chiller Network on February 4, 2011

== Cast ==
- C. Thomas Howell as Seth Delray
- Lindsey McKeon as Maddy
- Darren Dalton as Donnie
- Rey Valentin as Stark
- Siri Baruc as Grace
- David Schifter as Calvin Simpkins
- Madison Weidberg as Jillian
- Brandon Luck as Jim Kenton
- Phillip Troy Linger as Sheriff Hooper
