= Montana (1990 film) =

1990 TV film

- Written by: Larry McMurtry
- Directed by: William Graham
- Starring: Gena Rowlands; Richard Crenna; Lea Thompson; Justin Deas; Elizabeth Berridge; Darren Dalton
- Composer: David McHugh
- Country of origin: United States
- Original language: English

Production
- Executive producer: Roger Gimbel
- Producer: Fred Roos
- Production location: Bozeman, Montana
- Cinematography: Dennis Lewiston
- Editor: Corky Ehlers
- Running time: 100 minutes
- Production companies: Turner Pictures; HBO Production; Roger Gimbel Productions; Zoetrope Studios

Original release
- Network: TNT
- Release: February 19, 1990

Montana is a 1990 American Western television film directed by William Graham and written by Larry McMurtry. The film stars Gena Rowlands, Richard Crenna, Lea Thompson, Justin Deas, Elizabeth Berridge and Darren Dalton. The film premiered on TNT on February 19, 1990.

== Plot ==
The Guthrie family are cattle ranchers in Montana who are struggling to make ends meet in the 1980s. When a large coal company offers to buy their land to open a strip mine, it causes controversy in the family and the community over the future of development.

The movie was about opposition to mining in Montana. According to Larry McMutry, the film took eighteen years to get made and by the time it did, he was off the project. He later wrote, "I never saw it but understand it was pretty good. The fact that it did finally get made was because Ted Turner acquired a big ranch in Montana and was seeking tax write-offs. It began as a virtuous little film, which is possibly why I had trouble getting in sync with it. I have never, I suppose, been a particularly good citizen, especially not when citizenship interferes with the attempt to make art."

The historian Ryan Driskell Tate has noted that the "screenplay experiments with themes central to McMurtry's later works: the clash between romantic and realistic frontiers, between white men reared on the myths of cowboy heroes and the new class of tycoons who upend their existence."

== Analysis ==
The film provides a social commentary on technology in the 1980s. The historian Ryan Driskell Tate writes:

The film's fixation on technology provides a central metaphor in this world where men feel emasculated and inadequate in modern industrial society. The Guthries are at their best as a family, and egalitarians, when working the land with simple tools... The freedom from machines and big technologies restores their humanity... By contrast, the new coal miners embrace mechanized existence as a sturdy tool for violence and domination (over nature, over women, over anachronistic ranchers, over each other)."

== Cast ==
- Gena Rowlands as Bess Guthrie
- Richard Crenna as Hoyce Guthrie
- Lea Thompson as Peg Guthrie
- Justin Deas as Clyde
- Elizabeth Berridge as Lavetta
- Darren Dalton as Jim "Jimbo"
- Scott Coffey as Willie
- Michael Madsen as Pierce
- Jim Bishop as Chesler
- Dana Andersen as Fran
- Dean Norris as Foreman
- Michael Rider as John Donley
- Frank Salsedo as Joe "Hold His Gun"
- Timothy James Sampson as Sarge
- Tom Simmons as Young Surveyor
- Jack Vanderlans as Jack "Little Jack"
- John William Young as "Big Boomer"
