= Brotherhood of Justice =

1986 American television film

- Genre: Action; Drama; Thriller
- Teleplay by: Noah Jubelirer; Jeffrey Bloom
- Story by: Noah Jubelirer
- Directed by: Charles Braverman
- Starring: Keanu Reeves; Kiefer Sutherland; Lori Loughlin; Joe Spano; Darren Dalton; Evan Mirand; Don Michael Paul
- Theme music composer: Brad Fiedel
- Country of origin: United States
- Original language: English

Production
- Executive producers: Peter Guber; Jon Peters
- Producers: Judith R. James; Margot Winchester
- Production locations: Santa Cruz, California; Aptos, California; Watsonville, California
- Cinematography: Hanania Baer
- Editors: Bert Glatstein; Ann E. Mills
- Running time: 93 min.
- Production companies: The Guber-Peters Company; Margot Winchester Productions; Phoenix Entertainment Group; Taper Media Enterprises

Original release
- Network: ABC
- Release: May 18, 1986

The Brotherhood of Justice is a 1986 Canadian-American television action movie featuring Keanu Reeves, Billy Zane, Kiefer Sutherland, and Lori Loughlin.

Film critic & historian Leonard Maltin disliked the picture, describing it as "...Head of the Class meets The Mod Squad."

== Overview ==
The movie is based on actual events that occurred in 1984 at Paschal High School in Fort Worth, Texas, where a vigilante group formed under the name "The Legion of Doom". The movie was filmed in Santa Cruz County in the San Francisco Bay Area in California. Some locations used were Aptos High School in Aptos, California, Downtown Watsonville, California, the Santa Cruz Beach Boardwalk, and various beaches in the area around Santa Cruz.

== Plot ==
The eponymous "Brotherhood of Justice" begins as an attempt by several students to end vandalism and drug sales in and near their high school, but this "solution" gradually becomes worse than the original problem. As the Brotherhood's targets expand to include all who irritate them for any reason, the group's actions escalate to arson and attempted murder. Its original main organizer, Derek, realizing what the group has become, eventually reports his comrades.

== Cast ==
- Keanu Reeves as Derek
- Lori Loughlin as Christie
- Kiefer Sutherland as Victor Parks
- Joe Spano as School Principal Bob Grootemat
- Darren Dalton as Scottie
- Evan Mirand as "Mule"
- Don Michael Paul as Collin
- Gary Riley as Barnwell
- Billy Zane as Les
- Danny Nucci as Willie
- Danny De La Paz as Carlos
- Jim Haynie as Sheriff
- Sean Sullivan as Pastey
- Perla Walter as Maria
