= Soul Man (film) =

1986 film by Steve Miner

- Theatrical release poster
- Directed by: Steve Miner
- Written by: Carol Black
- Produced by: Steve Tisch
- Starring: C. Thomas Howell; Rae Dawn Chong; Arye Gross; James B. Sikking; Leslie Nielsen; James Earl Jones
- Cinematography: Jeffrey Jur
- Edited by: David Finfer
- Music by: Tom Scott
- Production companies: Balcor Film Investors; The Steve Tisch Company
- Distributed by: New World Pictures
- Release date: October 24, 1986
- Running time: 104 minutes
- Country: United States
- Language: English
- Budget: $4.5 million
- Box office: $35 million

Soul Man is a 1986 American comedy film directed by Steve Miner and written by Carol L. Black. C. Thomas Howell stars as a white male law student who pretends to be black in order to qualify for a scholarship. Its title refers to the song of the same name by Isaac Hayes and David Porter; the original soundtrack includes a version performed by Sam Moore and Lou Reed.

The film garnered controversy due to Howell's makeup drawing comparisons to blackface, which prompted protests against the film upon its release. Despite the controversy and negative reviews from critics, Soul Man was a commercial success, grossing $35 million on a $4.5 million budget.

== Plot ==
Mark Watson, the pampered son of a wealthy family, is about to attend Harvard Law School, along with his best friend Gordon. Unfortunately, his father's neurotic psychiatrist convinces his patient to focus on his happiness instead of spending money on his son. Mark is denied a student loan and the only scholarship he sees is for African Americans. He decides to cheat by using tanning pills, in a larger dose than prescribed, to appear as an African American. Watson then sets out for Harvard, naïvely believing that black people have no problems at all in American society.

However, once immersed in a black student's life, Mark finds out that prejudice and racism truly exist. He meets a young African American student named Sarah Walker, whom he only flirts with at first; gradually, however, he genuinely falls in love with her. In passing, she mentions that he received the scholarship she was in the running for at the last minute. Due to this, she not only has to handle her classes but also work as a waitress to support herself and her young son, George.

Slowly, Mark begins to regret his decision as he continues to experience problems because of his skin tone. Mark is jailed with uneducated, slovenly locals who take out their frustration with a team's loss to black athletes by assaulting Mark. He also finds himself subjected to sexual harassment by his landlord's daughter, Whitney, who is eager to explore what she perceives to be the "exotic" thrill of sleeping with a black man.

After a chaotic day in which Sarah, his parents (who are not aware of his double life), and Whitney all make surprise visits at the same time, Mark drops the charade and publicly reveals himself to be white. He is surprised many will forgive him after considering his reasons, but Sarah is furious. Mark has a private conversation with his professor. He has learned more than he bargained for, admitting that he still doesn't know what it is like to be black because he could have changed back to being white at any time.

Mark forfeits his scholarship but gets a loan (albeit at high interest). He goes to Sarah and begs for another chance, to which she agrees after Mark stands up for her and George when two male students tell a racist joke in front of them.

== Cast ==
- C. Thomas Howell as Mark Watson
- Rae Dawn Chong as Sarah Walker
- Arye Gross as Gordon Bloomfield
- James B. Sikking as Bill Watson
- Leslie Nielsen as Mr. Dunbar
- James Earl Jones as Professor Banks
- Melora Hardin as Whitney Dunbar
- Julia Louis-Dreyfus as Lisa Stimson
- Maree Cheatham as Dorothy Watson
- Wallace Langham as Barky Brewer
- Max Wright as Dr. Aronson
- Amy Stoch as Girl in Bed

== Production ==
Producer Steve Tisch offered the role of Mark Watson to Anthony Michael Hall, Tim Robbins, Anthony Edwards, Val Kilmer and John Cusack, all of whom declined. Star C. Thomas Howell later said, "when I made the movie, I didn't go into it with the idea that I had a responsibility to sort of teach America a lesson. I went into it because it was a great script. It was so well-written, so funny, and—sadly—very true. A lot of the experiences this guy goes through, maybe he wouldn't have gone through them if he was a white person, but when he's black, it's a very different experience."

Ron Reagan, son of then-president Ronald Reagan and first lady Nancy Reagan, had a small role in the film.

== Reception ==
=== Controversy ===
The film was widely criticized for its use of make-up to make a white actor appear African American, which many compared to blackface. Members of the NAACP spoke out against the film and an African American student group at UCLA organized a picket of a cinema screening Soul Man.

NAACP Chapter President Willis Edwards said in a statement at the time, "We certainly believe it is possible to use humor to reveal the ridiculousness of racism. However the unhumorous and quite seriously made plot point of Soul Man is that no black student could be found in all of Los Angeles who was academically qualified for a scholarship geared to blacks."

In defending the film, Tisch compared it to Tootsie (1982), which featured a man masquerading as a woman for career advancement. "It used comedy as a device to expose sexual stereotyping. I think Soul Man uses it to explode racial stereotyping."

The film was seen by USA President Ronald and Nancy Reagan at Camp David. "The Reagans enjoyed the film and especially enjoyed seeing their son Ron," a White House spokesman said at the time.

=== Critical reception ===
Controversy aside, the film was panned by critics. It has a score of 17% on Rotten Tomatoes from 24 reviews. The critics's consensus reads, "Critics had a whole lot less than a truckload of good loving for this woefully misguided take on race in '80s America". Metacritic, which uses a weighted average, assigned the film a score of 33 out of 100, based on 12 critics, indicating "generally unfavorable" reviews.

Roger Ebert gave Soul Man one out of four stars, writing that the main premise "is a genuinely interesting idea, filled with dramatic possibilities, but the movie approaches it on the level of a dim-witted sitcom." Janet Maslin of The New York Times was more positive, writing: "[the film] has a breezy, unapologetic manner. And it also happens to be funny, which goes a long way toward making up for any underlying obtuseness or insensitivity... If ''Soul Man'' lacks polish, not to mention social awareness, it also lacks pretension. It's a blithe, silly, good-natured movie and, of its kind, quite an enjoyable one...", in addition to praising the cast.

=== Box office ===
Despite the controversy, the film was a box office success. On its opening weekend, it debuted at No. 3 behind Crocodile Dundee and The Color of Money, with $4.4 million. In total, Soul Man went on to gross $27.8 million domestically.

== Soundtrack ==
=== Charts ===
Chart (1987)	Peak position
Australia (Kent Music Report)	100

=== Music video ===
A music video for the title track, originally by Sam & Dave and performed by Sam Moore and Lou Reed, was released. The video starred actors Bruce Willis, Cybill Shepherd, Cassandra Peterson, Rae Dawn Chong, C. Thomas Howell, Ron Reagan, George Segal, Jamie Farr, boxer Ray Mancini and the children's character Gumby, all lip synching to the song. Tisch recruited the actors to do the cameos.

== Legacy ==
Chong later defended the film, saying of the controversy:

It was only controversial because Spike Lee made a thing of it. He'd never seen the movie and he just jumped all over it… He was just starting and pulling everything down in his wake. If you watch the movie, it's really making white people look stupid… [The film] is adorable and it didn't deserve it... I always tried to be an actor who was doing a part that was a character versus what I call 'blackting,' or playing my race, because I knew that I would fail because I was mixed [Chong is of African, Chinese and European ancestry]. I was the black actor for sure, but I didn't lead with my epidermis, and that offended people like Spike Lee, I think. You're either militant or you're not and he decided to just attack. I've never forgiven him for that because it really hurt me. I didn't realize [at the time] that not pushing the afro-centric agenda was going to bite me. When you start to do well people start to say you're a Tom [as in Uncle Tom] because you're acceptable.

Lee responded by saying, "In my film career, any comment or criticism has never been based on jealousy."

"A white man donning blackface is taboo," said Howell. "Conversation over — you can't win. But our intentions were pure: We wanted to make a funny movie that had a message about racism."

Howell later expanded:

I'm shocked at how truly harmless that movie is, and how the anti-racial message involved in it is so prevalent... This isn't a movie about blackface. This isn't a movie that should be considered irresponsible on any level... It's very funny... It made me much more aware of the issues we face on a day-to-day basis, and it made me much more sensitive to racism... It's an innocent movie, it's got innocent messages, and it's got some very, very deep messages. And I think the people that haven't seen it that judge it are horribly wrong. I think that's more offensive than anything. Judging something you haven’t seen is the worst thing you can really do. In fact, Soul Man sort of represents that all the way through. I think it's a really innocent movie with a very powerful message, and it's an important part of my life. I'm proud of the performance, and I'm proud of the people that were in it. A lot of people ask me today, 'Could that movie be made today?'... Robert Downey Jr. just did it in Tropic Thunder!... The difference is that he was just playing a character in Tropic Thunder, and there was no magnifying glass on racism, which is so prevalent in our country. I guess that's what makes people more uncomfortable about Soul Man. But I think it's an important movie.

Downey Jr. referenced Howell and Soul Man when addressing the potential controversy over his role in Tropic Thunder: "At the end of the day, it's always about how well you commit to the character. If I didn't feel [the role in Tropic Thunder] was morally sound, or that it would be easily misinterpreted that I'm just C. Thomas Howell [in Soul Man], I would've stayed home."

American mathcore band Botch has a track named "C. Thomas Howell as the 'Soul Man'" on their second and final studio album We Are the Romans (1999).

== Home media ==
Soul Man was released on DVD on March 19, 2002, by Anchor Bay Entertainment. Special features included a theatrical and teaser trailer, along with an audio commentary by Miner and Howell. On November 20, 2007, it was re-released by Anchor Bay as a double feature with Fraternity Vacation (1985). On October 20, 2011, it was released by Image Entertainment as a double feature with 18 Again! (1988).
