= Nick G. Miller =

American businessman

Nick Miller
- Born: January 18, 1964; Dayton, Ohio, U.S.
- Occupations: Screenwriter, filmmaker, business consultant, musician
- Spouse(s): Amie Jacqueline Miller (divorced); Stephanie Seymour
- Children: 2

Nick G. Miller (born January 18, 1964), also known as Nick Miller, is an American businessman. His main interests are within the entertainment industry, the marine industry, and business education. Miller is a screenwriter, filmmaker, movie producer, movie director, television producer, actor, music producer, film composer, public speaker, and philanthropist. He has owned various companies within the marine industry and is a consultant and keynote speaker.

== Career ==
His acting credits include The Last Marshal, The Librarians, Chronicles of an Exorcism, and Catch of a Lifetime. He has produced feature films and television shows such as Palmetto, The Unlikely's, Catch of a Lifetime, E! Entertainment's Wild On the Mark Cuban series Art Mann Presents, Talent Rock, and CBS Television's The Music Cafe Presents (co-produced with Greg Rike and Greg Rike Studios). In 2005, Miller, along with producing partner Matthew Ashford did a test shoot for a screenplay they had written together in the horror film genre entitled Chronicles of an Exorcism. The film was originally shelved by Miller and his producers, but has since been released on DVD. In October 2008 the movie was one of the most watched horror movies of all time and was listed near the top 100 (#116) on the Internet Movie Database. Miller is currently post production on the movie Windwalkers and in pre production on a screenplay co-written with published author Timothy G. Grogan. In April 2014, as executive producer, Miller's romantic comedy, Catch of a Lifetime, directed by Ben Klopfenstein and written by Miller, Klopfenstein, and book author Connie Neumann, won the Audience Choice for Best Feature award at the Silver Springs International Film Festival.

Miller consults and works with companies on forming strategic alliance business plans via product placement, co-branding and media exposure. He has been instrumental in negotiating and placing products in feature films and television shows including War of the Worlds, I, Robot, Fun with Dick and Jane, Scream 3, Charlie's Angels, CSI: Miami, 24, Nash Bridges, V.I.P., and JAG.

Nick G. Miller produces and hosts sales and motivational training workshops across the globe. He has trained thousands of sales and service staff members from companies including FTD Flowers, Harley-Davidson, Featherlite Luxury Coaches, Bombardier, Platinum Coach Works, Northeast Marine Trade Association, Rio Roses, and many others.

Miller is also a music producer, and in 2009 became vice president of Living Legends Music, a property which includes a syndicated radio show, streaming iTunes radio, a DVD series, and the CBS television series The Music Cafe Presents, all featuring interviews with musicians. Miller also produced and hosted the 2009 DVD documentary Orleans: Official History & Music for the 1970s and 1980s band Orleans. He comes from a musical family dating back to 1940 when his great uncle Douglas Dalton, played mandolin and guitar for The Whippoorwills, Roy Rogers, Sons of the Pioneers, and other bands and musicians. Today, Miller performs with Nick Miller & The Gathering, a group consisting of rotating legendary musicians playing their own number one hits.

Miller's companies have produced nightclub events, swimwear modeling competitions, and VIP parties for Corona Beer, Harley-Davidson, Loews Hotels, Gibson, Universal Studios Theme Parks, Six Flags Theme Parks and others.

Miller has been part of the marine industry since 1986. As vice president, Miller played an instrumental part in resurrecting Donzi Marine in 1993. Miller and Donzi Marine manager Steve Simon formed "Team Donzi" and raced a Donzi 38 ZX in the American Power Boat Association circuit. The team won two APBA/UIM World Championships five APBA National Championships. Under the same ownership group, Miller organized a marketing campaign and formed strategic alliances with non-endemic companies helping Pro-Line Boats become the #1 selling fiberglass fishing boats in the United States. During the mid-2000s Miller consulted and worked with the offshore racing champion, Reggie Fountain and his company Fountain Powerboats. In 2012 he became a partner and shareholder of Sak Marine, a Georgia-based company that manufactured Caravelle Boats, Key Largo Boats, Interceptor Performance Boats, Clearwater Fishing Boats, and Sea Hawk Boats.

Nick Miller was introduced to Burt Reynolds at his home in Florida. The lunch meeting resulted in Miller being offered acting roles in two of Reynolds' films. Soon after he would meet the man who would become his mentor; the late filmmaker John Daly, of which just some of his movies includes Platoon, The Terminator, The Falcon and the Snowman, Salvador, Full Metal Jacket, The Bodyguard, and The Legend of Zorro.

== Gallery ==
Miller with business partner Jordy Kline on set

Miller (right) and Kid Rock in studio working on "Cocky"

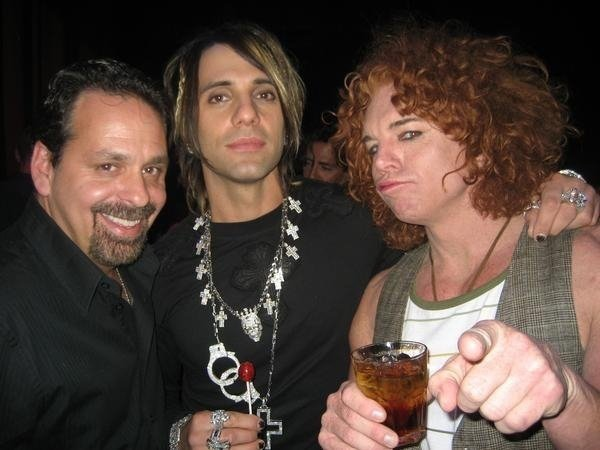
Miller (left), Criss Angel and Carrot Top at the VH1 Awards
