= Louie Says =

- Origin: U.S.
- Genre: Indie rock
- Years active: 1997
- Label: RCA Records
- Past members: Sam Slovick; Clark Stiles; Josh Crawley

Louie Says was an American indie rock trio on the RCA Records label. The group consisted of Clark Stiles, Sam Slovick, and Josh Crawley. They released two CDs in 1997; one was a demo EP called Cold to the Touch, the other was their debut (and only) album entitled Gravity, Suffering, Love, and Fate.

Despite the group's short lived career they produced one notable song – "She". "She" was featured in American television shows such as Dawson’s Creek (Episode 1x10 – "Double Date") and Buffy the Vampire Slayer (Episode 2x05 – "Reptile Boy") when those shows appeared on the now defunct WB network.

== Members ==
- Clark Stiles – Guitar, Bass, Drums, etc.
- Sam Slovick – Lead vocals
- Josh Crawley – Keyboards and Vocals

== Discography ==
- Cold to the Touch (EP), 1997
- Gravity, Suffering, Love, and Fate, 1997
