= Sam Slovick =

American actor, musician, and writer (born 1958)

- Born: June 23, 1958 (age 67)
- Occupation(s): Writer, actor, musician
- Website: www.samslovick.com

Samuel J. Slovick (born June 23, 1958) is an American actor, musician, and writer.

== Life and career ==
Slovick grew up in Oshkosh, Wisconsin. He currently lives in Topanga, California.

As an actor, he appeared in the movies Red Dawn (1984) and Home for the Holidays (1995), and the TV series Fame. As a singer-songwriter, he was part of the 1990s cult classic group Louie Says.

Slovick has written for Whole Life Times, LA Yoga magazine, and Good Magazine. His work on Skid Row, Los Angeles for LA Weekly won a 2007 prize at The Magazine Awards of Western Publishing, was submitted for a Pulitzer Prize, and was made into a documentary. In 2008, Slovick wrote a sexually graphic review of immigrant LGBT bar The Silver Platter near MacArthur Park. The review led to protests; it was later removed and Slovick apologized. His recent work for Mission and State includes The People vs. Brian Tacadena and Sacred Monsters. He also recently released a documentary series for Participant Media's Take Part, Scenes From The New Revolution and an essay on political resistance for SLAKE literary journal.

== Filmography ==
- High School U.S.A. (1984) (Crazy Leo Bandini, as Sam Slovik)
- Red Dawn (1984) (Yuri)
- ABC Afterschool Special (1984) (Messenger) (Summer Switch)
- Fame (1984–85) (Cassidy) (6 episodes)
- My Man Adam (1985) (Derric)
- White and Lazy (1986)
- Home for the Holidays (1995) (Jack)
- The Japanese Sandman (2008) (Bill Gains)
