= Teri Ann Linn =

American actress and singer

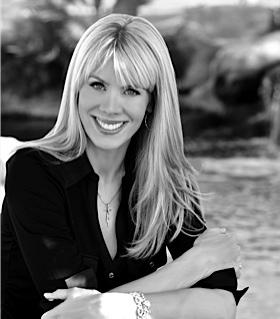
- Linn in 2013
- Born: Honolulu, Hawaii
- Occupations: Actor, Pop-recording Artist, Model
- Years active: 1982–1999

Teri Ann Linn is an American actress and singer who also worked in Finland and Italy. She originated the role of Kristen Forrester Dominguez on The Bold and the Beautiful, appearing regularly from 1987 to 1990, briefly returning in 1992 and again in 1994.

== Miss Hawaii USA 1981 ==
Linn was Miss Hawaii USA 1981 and fourth runner-up in the Miss USA 1981 pageant.

== Acting career ==
She appeared as a guest on Johnny Carson's Tonight Show, April 28, 1982 with the Disney Corporation for a Mousercise album. The album earned a Gold Record after which she hosted a TV show called Grand Prix All Star Show with co-host Michael Young.

Linn's TV appearances also include Hawaii Five-O, Magnum, P.I., Herman's Head, Hill Street Blues, Mike Hammer, Flamingo Road, Dallas, and T. J. Hooker.

She had the lead female role in the Italian comedy mini-series Anni '60.

She was a host, guest host and made appearances on Hour Magazine, PM Magazine, Hollywood Squares and Family Feud (as "family" leader). She also performed in a trapeze act on the 1987 Circus of the Stars.

Although generally cast as the nice, pretty girl, People Magazine quoted her as saying "No problem creating bitchiness; everybody has it in them."

Known for big hair in the eighties, Linn later appeared with post-80's looks in a 1996 movie, Pure Danger, that also featured Marcus Chong (The Matrix). In another 1999 movie, Fallout with Daniel Baldwin, she plays a NASA computer engineer sent into space to fix broken hardware.

== Singing career ==
Linn's first albums, Love is the Answer and Be Young, Be Foolish, Be Happy were recorded under the Fazer Music label in 1993 and 1997 with European/Finland releases.

Her CD Teri was released in the United States in 1998 by the record label Pool Party with a re-arranged track order. According to CD Universe:

"this album, which went Gold on the European charts, is a mix of styles ranging from sexy dance cuts to heartfelt ballads, as well as 2 duets"

with Donny Gerrard (Forrest Gump, Little Shop of Horrors, Little Mermaid).

== Personal life ==
Linn was raised in the Diamond Head area of Honolulu, Hawaii.

Linn was a schoolmate of Barack Obama at Punahou School in Honolulu, Hawaii (both graduated in 1979). She was quoted in the Italian daily Corriere della Sera, saying that the future United States President had a "cute afro" and that he "dressed like John Travolta." She added that she thought Obama wasn't very good at tennis, "or we would have played tennis together", since she knew the good tennis players in Hawaii.

At Punahou, Linn was the 1978 Hawaii state girls' singles tennis champion.

She went to both the University of San Diego and Pepperdine University, attending the latter for one year.

In 1981, Linn and her mother won the Mother-Daughter US Open Tennis Championship.

In People magazine, she is pictured with her (then) "boyfriend" actor Tony Griffin, the only child of entertainment business magnate Merv Griffin.

Linn has been a licensed real estate agent in Hawaii and California.

Awards and achievements
Preceded by Carol Ching	Miss Hawaii USA; 1981	Succeeded by Vanessa Dubois
