= Michael Russo =

Michael Russo may refer to:

- Michael Russo (rugby league) (born 1983), rugby league footballer of the 2000s
- Michael Russo (sportswriter), American sports journalist for The Athletic
- Michael Russo of Ralph & Russo

== See also ==
- Michael Dellorusso (born 1983), American soccer player
