= Carrot Top =

American stand-up comedian and actor (born 1965)

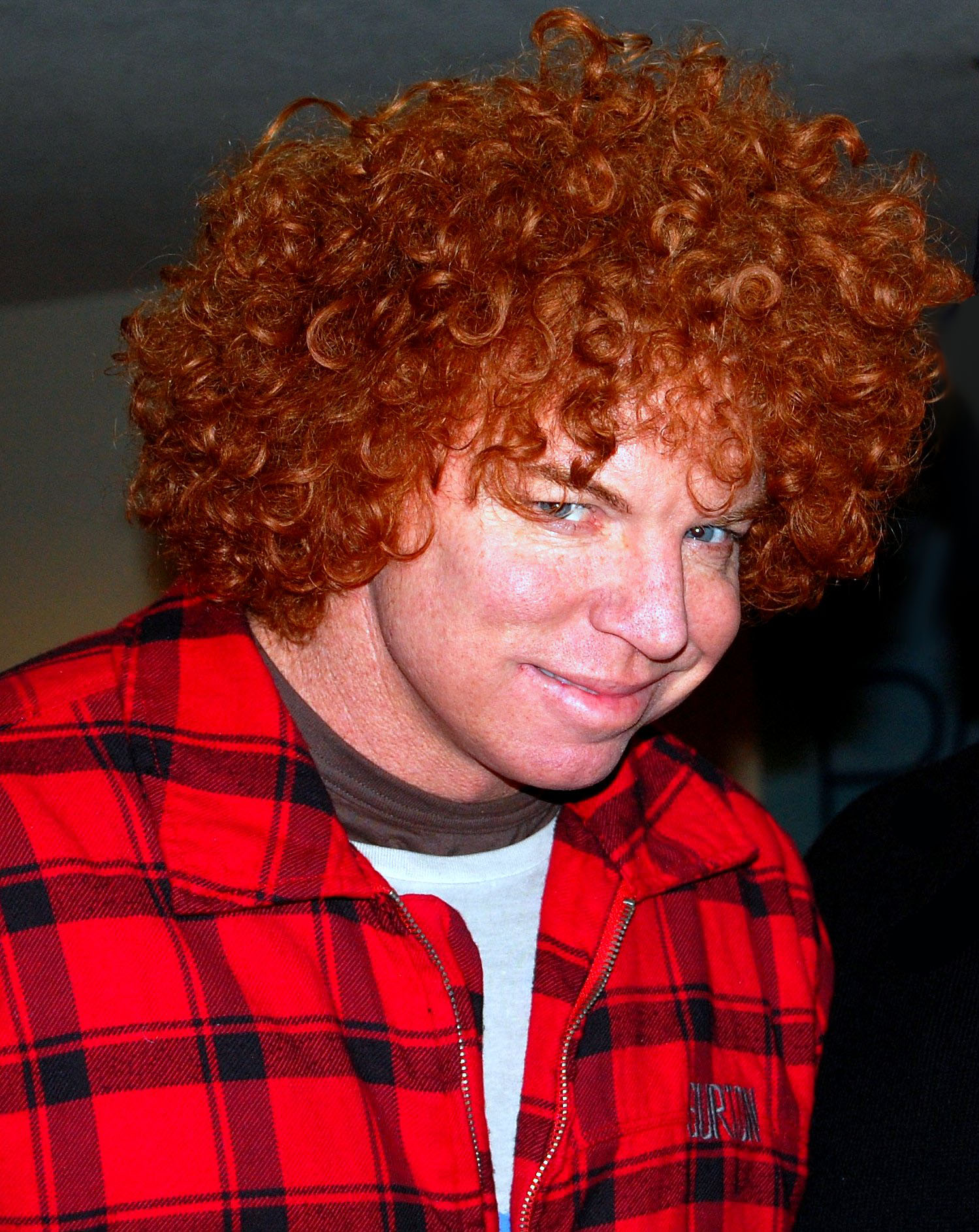
- Carrot Top in January 2009
- Born: Scott Christopher Thompson; February 25, 1965 (age 61); Rockledge, Florida, U.S.

Comedy career
- Years active: 1985–present
- Medium: Film, stand-up comedy, television
- Genres: Prop comedy, satire
- Subjects: American culture, self-deprecation
- Website: www.carrottop.com

Scott Christopher Thompson (born February 25, 1965), known professionally as Carrot Top, is an American stand-up comedian and actor. He is known for his use of prop comedy.

== Early life, family and education ==
Scott Christopher Thompson was born in Rockledge, Florida, and was raised in Cocoa, Florida. He has an older brother, and their father was a NASA engineer. Thompson and his brother were raised Catholic and attended St. Mary’s Catholic School as children. As a student at Cocoa High School, Scott played drums in the marching and concert band, and he graduated in 1983.

A local swimming coach gave him the nickname "Carrot Top", a reference to his red hair, which would become his trademark in later life.

After high school he enrolled at Florida Atlantic University in Boca Raton, Florida. While a college freshman, Thompson performed his first standup comedy routine.

== Career ==
In the late 1980s, Thompson worked as a courier for a mortgage company.

His big break was in 1991 when he performed on Comic Strip Live. Around this time, he also performed on the competition television show Star Search. He has appeared in Larry the Cable Guy's Christmas Spectacular, Gene Simmons Family Jewels, Space Ghost Coast to Coast, Criss Angel Mindfreak, Scrubs (2001), George Lopez, and Tugger: The Jeep 4x4 Who Wanted to Fly (2005). His film roles include Chairman of the Board, and he also served as a spokesman in commercials for 1-800-CALL-ATT. In 2002, he recorded a commentary track for The Rules of Attraction. In 2006, Carrot Top appeared in the Reno 911! episode "Weigel's Pregnant" as an enraged version of himself who trashes his hotel room and steals a police car. In 2008, he was a guest judge for Last Comic Standing.

From 1995 to 1999, Carrot Top was the continuity announcer for Cartoon Network, for which he also produced and starred in an early morning show, Carrot Top's AM Mayhem, from 1994 to 1996.

=== Live comedy ===
Since 2005, Carrot Top has headlined at MGM Resorts International properties in Las Vegas, Nevada. He has had a residency comedy show at the Luxor Hotel in Las Vegas since November 22, 2005, and he performs various comedy engagements when his show is not playing. His comedy routine typically incorporates dozens of props stored in large trunks on stage and his prop jokes commonly consist of his pulling out a prop, describing it in a one-liner, and tossing it away. He typically closes his show with a lip-synced musical montage.

=== Television appearances ===
On January 16, 2010, Carrot Top appeared on Don't Forget the Lyrics!, where he assisted illusionists Penn & Teller in their quest for the million-dollar grand prize. He was one of the roasters at the Comedy Central Roast of Flavor Flav and Gene Simmons Roast. He appeared on a second-season episode of the television series Criss Angel Mindfreak and continued to be a regular guest. Carrot Top also appeared in an episode of the reality series The Bad Girls Club. He appeared as himself in episodes of CSI: Crime Scene Investigation ("Man Up"), Family Guy ("Petergeist"), Scrubs ("My Balancing Act"), and Robot Chicken ("The Unnamed One").

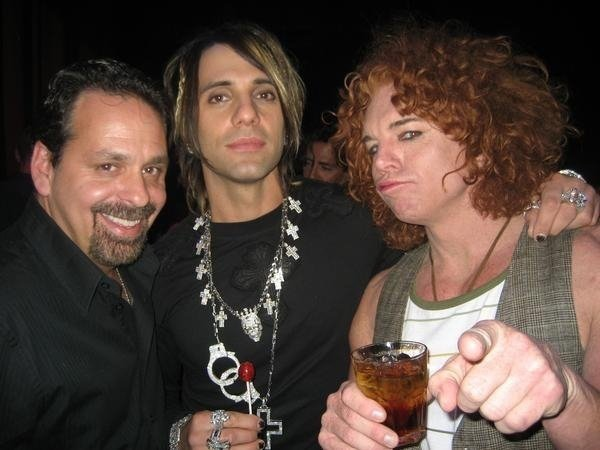
Nick G. Miller (left), Criss Angel, and Carrott Top (right) at the VH1 Awards

Carrot Top appeared briefly in both Bad Girls Club's third season (2008–09) and Holly's World (2010–11). He appeared alongside country artist Toby Keith in the music video for "Red Solo Cup" and also appeared alongside Keith as he performed the song in the audience as a member of Keith's entourage at the 2011 ACM Awards.

Carrot Top has appeared on numerous nighttime television talk shows. In 1996, he appeared on the animated/live action Cartoon Network talk show Space Ghost Coast to Coast. On February 8, 2010, he appeared on an episode of The Jay Leno Show, wherein he had pies thrown at him by Leno and guest Emma Roberts. He appeared on The Late Late Show with Craig Ferguson alongside Courteney Cox on May 24, 2011.

Carrot Top appeared on an episode of Tosh.0, receiving a full-body massage from Daniel Tosh. He was also a special guest performer in Tosh.0's Selena Gomez tribute video of "Good for You".

On October 22, 2011, Carrot Top appeared as a first-time guest panelist on Red Eye w/Greg Gutfeld. On April 13, 2016, he appeared as a panelist on the @midnight game show.

=== Internet series roles ===
Carrot Top appeared as himself on the Bradley Cooper episode of Between Two Ferns with Zach Galifianakis. He also appeared as himself on the show Tom Green's House Tonight to discuss his props and career. In 2022, he appeared on The Joe Rogan Experience on Spotify episode #1758. On October 26, 2023, he appeared as himself in the ‘Guess How Much This Weighs (Challenge)’ episode of YouTube variety show Good Mythical Morning with Rhett and Link. On May 26, 2025, he appeared on Kill Tony, and again on September 15.

== Personal life ==
Carrot Top had a long-term relationship in the early 2000s with Amanda Hogan, according to the Detroit Free Press.

In August 2026, singer Brian Evans filed a $15 million lawsuit against Carrot Top, which claims the comedian sent an unsolicited sexually explicit video and subsequently tried to compel Evans into a legal settlement. Later, Zachary Defazio filed a supporting statement, and alleged Carrot Top catfished him on the Grindr app by pretending to be younger than his actual age when making sexual advances, and also supplied alcohol when Defazio was 19 years old, under the legal drinking age.

On September 18, 2026, Carrot Top's scheduled appearances were canceled after he attempted suicide.

== Filmography ==
=== Film ===
Carrot Top's film credits with year of release, film titles and roles
Year	Title	Role	Notes
1995	Hourglass	Clerk	Direct-to-video
1996	Pure Danger	Morgue Truck Driver	Direct-to-video
1998	Chairman of the Board	Edison	
1998	Dennis the Menace Strikes Again	Sylvester	Direct-to-video
2003	Pauly Shore Is Dead	Himself	Mockumentary
2003	Carrot Top Rocks Las Vegas	Himself	Direct-to-video
2005	Now That's Funny	Himself	Direct-to-video
2005	Tugger: The Jeep 4x4 Who Wanted to Fly	Shorty	
2005	The Aristocrats	Himself	Documentary
2007	Shortcut to Happiness	Himself	Guest on talk show on television Cameo appearance
2007	The Bros	Himself	Direct-to-video
2007	Smiley Face	Himself	Brief walk-on part
2009	The Hangover	Himself	Uncredited cameo
2012	Last Call	Mailman	
2014	Swearnet: The Movie	Himself	
2019	The Amazing Johnathan Documentary	Himself	Documentary

=== Television ===
Carrot Top's television credits with year of release, film titles and roles
Year	Title	Role	Notes
1996	Space Ghost Coast to Coast	Himself	Voice role Episode: "Lovesick"
1997	The Larry Sanders Show	Himself	Episode: "The Roast"
2000	N.Y.U.K	Dr. Eugene Splicer	
2001	Weakest Link	Himself	Episode: "Comedians #2 Special"
2002	Scrubs	Himself	Episode: "My Balancing Act"
2004	George Lopez	Himself	Episode: "George Searches for a Needle in a Haight-Stack"
2006; 2017	Family Guy	Himself	Voice role 2 episodes
2006	Reno 911!	Himself	Episode: "Wiegel's Pregnant"
2007-2008	Gene Simmons Family Jewels	Himself	2 episodes
2009	Bad Girls Club	Himself	Episode: "What Happens in Vegas... Airs on TV"
2009	The Girls Next Door	Himself	Episode: "Meet the New Girls"
2010	Tosh.0	Himself	Episode: "Peter Pan Fail Girls"
2011	CSI: Crime Scene Investigation	Himself	2 episodes
2014	The Neighbors	Himself	Episode: "Oscar Party"
2016	Robot Chicken	Himself	Episode: "The Unnamed One"
2016	Hitting the Breaks	Himself	5 episodes
2016	Sharknado: The 4th Awakens	Driver	Television film
2024	Hacks	Himself	Episode: "Better Late"; Uncredited
