= Marcus Chong =

American actor (born 1967)

- Born: Marcus Scott Wyatt; July 8, 1967 (age 59); Seattle, Washington, U.S.
- Occupation: Actor
- Years active: 1977–2013
- Notable work: Panther; The Matrix

Marcus Scott Chong (né Wyatt; born July 8, 1967) is an American former actor. He played Miguel Mendez in the crime drama, Street Justice (1991–1993), real-life activist Huey P. Newton in Panther (1995), and Tank in The Matrix (1999).

== Early life ==
Chong was born in Seattle on July 8, 1967, to an African-American father and a Chinese mother. His biological father, Martin Wyatt, was a sports reporter in San Francisco for KGO-TV. He was adopted by Tommy and Shelby Chong in 1978.

== Career ==
Chong began acting at age nine. His first role was portraying the young Frankie Warner in the 1979 miniseries Roots: The Next Generations (1979). He was a guest star in Little House on the Prairie, in "Blind Journey: Part 2".

Chong originated the role of student Lee Cortez in the Broadway production of Stand-Up Tragedy, written by Bill Cain, which opened at the Criterion Center Stage Right and closed in October 1990 after 13 performances. The short-lived role nevertheless earned him a 1991 Theatre World Award; he was also nominated Drama Desk Award for Outstanding Featured Actor in a Play.

In the early 1990s, Chong played the recurring character Miguel Mendez on the TV show Street Justice from 1991 to 1993. By 1994, he later appeared in the action series Vanishing Son as Fu Qua Johnson alongside many other actors of Asian descent. In 1995, he appeared in the music video for "Temptations" with Coolio, Ice-T, and Jada Pinkett Smith.

In 1999, Chong appeared as Tank in The Matrix. Throughout the 2000s decade and briefly the 2010s, Chong has appeared in popular TV shows in supporting guest roles. In 2001, he appeared in the third season of the TV series Law & Order: Special Victims Unit and in 2002, appeared in the first season of Law & Order: Criminal Intent. In 2009, he appeared in the sixth season of Numb3rs and in 2010, he had a role in the fourth season of Burn Notice.

Chong's last feature film role was in the 2005 movie The Crow: Wicked Prayer as a character named War. The film was released briefly in theaters in Chong's hometown of Seattle, Washington. Following this, he's appeared in multiple short films: "Concrete River" (2009), "Son Shine" (2013), and "Not 4 Sale" (2013); the latter in which he plays legendary actor Harry Belafonte. Following the last short film Not 4 Sale, Chong has had no further acting roles.

== The Matrix controversy ==
In May 2003, Chong filed a lawsuit at Los Angeles County Superior Court against Warner Bros and AOL Time Warner, saying Warner was in breach of a 1998 verbal agreement, and a 2000 contract to continue the character of Tank in the film's two sequels. Chong was offered a total of $250,000 to appear in The Matrix Reloaded and The Matrix Revolutions. Chong claimed he was owed twice that amount, in addition to bonuses and guarantees he would be invited to press junkets and premieres. When the Wachowskis rejected his demands, Chong was arrested in October 2000 for allegedly making threatening phone calls to the filmmakers. In his suit, Chong claimed he had since been blackballed from Hollywood and blamed The Matrix creators and Warner Bros. for branding him a "terrorist".

In 2016, Chong did a radio interview with BlogTalkRadio going into detail regarding behind-the-scenes issues during production of The Matrix and instances that occurred afterwards where he felt he was treated unfairly.

In 2018, he released a documentary, "The Marcus Chong Story", on his YouTube channels (under the names "Marcus Wyatt" and "Marcus Chong"), detailing his life and the issues he's faced working with actor C. Thomas Howell (his ex-brother-in-law) on the direct-to-video movie Pure Danger (1996) and during production of The Matrix in 1998.

== Filmography ==
=== Film ===
Year	Title	Role	Notes
1978	Lady and the Tramp: A Lesson in Sharing Attention	Richard	Educational short film from the Disney's Animated Classics: Lessons in Living series
1980	The Reference Section	Lead	Short film
1980	Cheech & Chong's Next Movie	Johnny	
1980	Blood Beach	2nd kid	
1988	Evil Altar	Troy Long	
1990	The Knife and Gun Club	George	Television film
1991	Flight of Black Angel	'Dragonfly'	Television film
1992	Venice/Venice	Guest at party	
1992	American Heart	Terry Cosmos	
1994	Vanishing Son	Fu Qua Johnson	Television film
1994	Vanishing Son II	Fu Qua Johnson	Television film
1994	Vanishing Son IV	Fu Qua Johnson	Television film
1995	Panther	Huey Newton	
1996	Pure Danger	'Freethrow'	Direct-to-video
1997	The Uncontrollable Professor	Chucky	
1997	Fatal Fight	Kevin	
1998	High Freakquency	Jordan Barnes	
1999	The Matrix	Tank	
2005	The Crow: Wicked Prayer	'War'	
2009	Concrete River	Base	Short film
2013	Son Shine	Darrell Brown	Short film
2013	Not 4 Sale	Harry Belafonte	Short film; also associate producer

=== Television ===
Year	Title	Role	Notes
1978	Little House on the Prairie	Samson	Episode: "Blind Journey: Part 2"
1979	Roots: The Next Generations	Frankie Warner	2 episodes
1979	The Lazarus Syndrome	Jerry	Episode: "Peace and Love, Willie Jackson"
1979	Dallas	Jimmy Monroe	Episode: "The Heiress"
1982	Diff'rent Strokes	Kid at the arcade	Episode: "Shoot-Out at the O.K. Arcade"
1982	The Facts of Life	Young Boy	Episode: "Starstruck"
1989	Hard Time on Planet Earth	Tim	Episode: "The Way Home"
1989	Dragnet	Billy Roberts	Episode: "The Connection"
1991–1993	Street Justice	Miguel Mendez	24 episodes
1995	Chicago Hope	Ramsey Coleman	Episode: "A Coupla Stiffs"
2000	Linc's	Ken	Episode: "People Like Us"
2001	Law & Order: Special Victims Unit	Darrell Guan	Episode: "Inheritance"
2002	Law & Order: Criminal Intent	Johnny West	Episode: "Seizure"
2009	Numb3rs	Jones	Episode: "Ultimatum"
2010	Burn Notice	Caleb	Episode: "Brotherly Love"
