= Far Out Man =

1990 American comedy film

- Theatrical release poster
- Directed by: Tommy Chong
- Written by: Tommy Chong
- Produced by: Lisa M. Hansen; John Pare
- Starring: Tommy Chong; C. Thomas Howell; Rae Dawn Chong; Shelby Chong; Paris Chong; Martin Mull; Judd Nelson; Michael Winslow; Cheech Marin; Paul Bartel
- Cinematography: Greg Gardiner; Eric Woster
- Edited by: Stephen R. Myers; Gilberto Costa Nunes
- Music by: Jay Chattaway
- Production company: CineTel Films
- Distributed by: New Line Cinema
- Release date: May 11, 1990
- Running time: 81 minutes
- Country: United States
- Language: English
- Budget: $1 million
- Box office: $82,000

Far Out Man is a 1990 American comedy film written, directed by and starring Tommy Chong. A co-production with CineTel Films, the film was released to theatres by New Line Cinema on May 11, 1990.

== Plot ==
An aging hippie goes on a road trip in search of his long lost family. He meets up with his son (Paris Chong, Tommy's real-life son). Together they go off to see America. A majority of Tommy's real life family have roles; daughter Rae Dawn plays his daughter and wife Shelby has a lead role as his ex. Chong's former partner Cheech Marin makes a cameo appearance as a passenger in the back of Far Out Man's truck.

== Cast ==
- Tommy Chong as Far Out Man
- C. Thomas Howell as himself
- Rae Dawn Chong as herself
- Shelby Chong as Tree
- Paris Chong as Kyle
- Martin Mull as Dr. Leddledick
- Bobby Taylor as Bobby
- Reynaldo Rey as Lou
- Peggy McIntaggart as Misty (Peggy F. Sands)
- Al Mancini as Fresno detective
- Judd Nelson as himself
- Cheech Marin as Cheech
- Michael Winslow as airport cop
- Lisa M. Hansen as police radio dispatcher
- Cynthia Darlow as Truck Stop Waitress
- Henry Kingi as Mean Indian
- Rae Allen as Holly
- Paul Bartel as Weebee Cool
- Paul Hertzberg as Drunk man with wine

== Production ==
Labeled on promotional posters and in the opening credits as "A Tommy Chong Attempt", it was filmed in Los Angeles, California, USA on a low-budget of $500,000.

Floyd Sneed, former drummer of the rock group Three Dog Night, and brother of Chong's first wife Maxine Sneed, made a small cameo in the film as a drummer during the nightclub scene.

A two-minute animation title sequence was featured in the film, and it was animated by a then-unknown Dan Povenmire, who was at the time a freelance animator for shows like Teenage Mutant Ninja Turtles during the film's production. He would go on to be an animator for X-Men: The Animated Series, and would do writing, storyboards, and directing credits for The Simpsons, Rocko's Modern Life, SpongeBob SquarePants, and Family Guy, before eventually creating Phineas and Ferb in the future.

== Release ==
=== Box office ===
The film grossed $82,000 in its limited release against its $1 million budget, making it a box office bomb.

=== Critical reception ===
Owen Gleiberman of Entertainment Weekly gave it a negative review, calling the film, "one lame ’60s-burnout joke after another. The movie [Far Out Man] is so weightless it barely gives you a contact high."
