= The Big Fall =

- Video cover
- Directed by: C. Thomas Howell
- Written by: William Applegate Jr.
- Produced by: Gaby K. Malouf; Joseph Merhi; Richard Pepin
- Starring: C. Thomas Howell; Sophie Ward; Jeff Kober; Sam Seder; Justin Lazard; Kathy Griffin
- Cinematography: Jürgen Baum
- Edited by: David Molino; Dennis M. O'Connor
- Music by: Gardner Cole; Simeon Spiegel
- Distributed by: PM Entertainment Group
- Release dates: April 11, 1997 (HBO); October 14, 1997 (US video premiere)
- Running time: 90 minutes
- Country: United States
- Language: English

The Big Fall is a 1997 American neo-noir action-drama film directed by and starring C. Thomas Howell.

When L.A. private detective Blaise Rybeck is hired by an alluring woman to find her brother, he is plunged headfirst into his deadliest case ever, including double-crossing deals and dangerous situations.

The film was released direct to video on October 14, 1997, having previously aired on HBO in April 1997.

== Plot ==
Los Angeles private investigator Blaise Rybeck, hired by Mrs. Brody to confirm her husband's infidelity, gets beaten. Directly afterwards, he returns what she paid him, suggesting that she get a divorce lawyer while rejecting her advances.

The next day at Rybeck Investigations, a man named Gary Snider offers his services. Formerly at the DA's office, a heart murmur prevented him from passing the physical to become an officer. So now, he is trying to become a P.I.

A woman named Emma Roussell then brings in a missing person case. Her flight instructor brother Ken disappeared three days before. The police found plane wreckage the day after his disappearance, but without a body. At night, at Hangar 66 at the airport, a man named Axe tortures a bound man to get information about what he stole from them.

At Kenneth Roussell's flight school, where Emma is at reception, Blaise finds an unusual patch with an upside down eagle's head in his office. Taking it with him to his friend Vic's bar, Blaise asks about it. A customer reveals that it belongs to the bungee jumpers the Fallen Eagles.

Blaise visits the bridge where they practice, introducing himself as a New Yorker just passing through. Blaise offers to buy them drinks, which Fallen Eagle Moe accepts for the following evening.

At the agency, Blaise asks Emma for documents from the flight school and about the Fallen Eagles. However, the feds demand that he stop his investigation of the school and Ken's disappearance. Agent Bill Dixon is in charge of the case.

Blaise goes out for drinks with Moe, who reveals that he is also a sky jumper. Claiming that he has come to the West Coast to escape troubles in the east, Blaise asks him for work. As they start to leave, the guy who had told Blaise about the jumping crew, now dressed with a swastika jacket, and his friend attack them, as Moe had slept with his sister. After Blaise defends him with a gun, he gets invited to Hangar 66 the next afternoon.

After arriving home, Emma appears for developments. Blaise is convinced that she is withholding information. Emma explains that she moved to England with inheritance money from her father, but came to work at the flight school when it ran out. Ken disappeared within a week. Emma then has sex with Blaise, but he wakes up alone.

At the Whiteman Airport hangar, Blaise first sees Moe and then Axe. The ring leader and two others intimidate him by pulling guns on him. Moe leads Blaise out, insisting that he did well.

Agent Dixon and other agents later chase Blaise down. They beat him up, reminding him to stay off the case. Gary calls Blaise to confirm that Ken's body was found. He tells Emma. Then, there is a drive by shooting, right after Gary tells Blaise that ER is all over the flight logs.

Blaise gives chase, but the coupé utility vehicle gets away. He goes directly to the hangar, where Moe lets him in. Breaking into Axe's office, Blaise sees photos of Emma with him. He demands that Emma tell him the truth.

The Fallen Eagles are a group of former paratroopers who hijack planes mid-flight. Their last heist, of an FBI cargo plane, had a big haul, but Ken tried to keep it for himself. Axe was not only his partner but Emma's husband. Blaise arrives to the hangar to find the group dividing the money and planning to disperse.

Emma arrives, shooting Axe. Emma had convinced her brother to double cross the paratrooper thieves. Now, she attempts to convince Blaise to run away with her. He helps Emma escape with the money, but opts to stay in LA as a P.I.

== Cast ==
- C. Thomas Howell as Blaise Rybeck
- Sophie Ward as Emma Roussell
- Jeff Kober as Johnny 'Axe' Roosevelt
- Sam Seder as Gary Snider
- Justin Lazard as Agent Bill Dickson
- Titus Welliver as Moe
- Buzz Belmondo as Brody
- Darren Dalton as Larry
- Joanne Baron as Mrs. Brody
- William Applegate Jr. as Agent Wilcox
- Steve DeRelian as Echo
- Kathy Griffin as Sally

== Reception ==
In his review, Nathan Rabin of The A.V. Club wrote "The script doesn't do Howell any favors, with its wide selection of stock characters and predictable twist." However, he remarked that "Howell's direction is surprisingly competent." He also labelled Howell's lead role in the film as "unintentionally hilarious", claiming "The eternally boyish and effeminate former teen star can't help but inspire chuckles as he spits out supposedly witty tough-guy banter and gritty narration in a silly Bogart-esque mumble that needs to be heard to be believed."
