= Eric S. Brown =

American novelist

- Occupation: Horror novelist
- Writing career
- Language: English
- Years active: 2003–present
- Genres: Horror, science fiction, post-apocalyptic
- Subject: Fictional survival/creature horror
- Notable works: Bigfoot War, Sasquatch Planet, Zombie Horror 101, Cowboys Vs. Zombies, Megalodon

Eric S. Brown is an American novelist known for writing science fiction/horror novels who lives in North Carolina. He has written nearly one hundred and twenty novels and publishes most of them with Severed Press. He began his writing career with short "zombie" horror stories, and then wrote his first full-length novel in 2003, entitled "Dying Days". It was followed by the "Queen" series, and then "Cowboys vs. Zombies". He now writes creature novels, post-apocalyptic fiction, stories about cryptids, and space-marine novels.

== Career ==
Brown began his career by writing short horror stories as well as illustrated graphic novels, which began with his first 2003 novel, "Dying Days". In 2004, he co-authored a novel entitled "Portals of Terror" along with Angeline Hawkes Craig.

In 2005, his next novel, entitled "Cobble" was released. It was co-authored by Susan Brydenbaugh. Brown had continued with "The Queen" which dealt with zombies controlling a cruise ship. Next was "Barren Earth", which was released in 2009. Also released in 2009 was his novel entitled "World War of the Dead".

After releasing a novel entitled "The Human Experiment", he got his big break when "Bigfoot War" was released. It was followed by "Dead in the Woods", which came out in 2011, along with the third entry, "Food Chain". Along with this new series, Brown wrote and published "The Bloody Rage of Bigfoot" in 2012.

After writing over six more entries into the Bigfoot War series, Brown published his first stand-alone novel entitled "Kaiju Dawn" in 2014, which began another series. Its sequel, "Kaiju Armageddon", was released a few months later. He wrote seven more entries into the Kaiju series before publishing his next stand-alone novel, "Megalodon" which was released on e-book and paperback in April 2015. The next novel he wrote, which was also released in 2015, was entitled "Megalodons", and was co-authored by Clarence Writz.

His next novel was "Megalodon Apocalypse". Then, in February 2016, he released a new novel entitled "Kraken", which followed a Navy ship as it battled horrifying mutant squids. It had good reviews from critics and customers alike. It was followed by "Alien Battalion", which told the story of Alien warfare. Then, "Kraken Island" was released just a month and a half later. It was followed by "Kraken Vs. Megalodon", where Eric combined the two mighty beasts of the deep.

=== 1632 series ===
In 2014, Brown branched out into the alternate history genre by contributing several short stories to various issues of Eric Flint's online magazine The Grantville Gazette set in Flint's 1632 universe. His first short story, The Magic of the Speedster appeared in volume 55 and it describes a 17th-century Native American's exposure to a 20th-century comic book that he had found on the body of a dead English colonist.

In the following year, Brown started his The Monster Society series, an ongoing series of short stories about young adult LARPers pretending to fight imaginary monsters in the outskirts of Grantville while growing up and dealing with the effects of 20th-century Grantville appearing suddenly in 17th-century Germany. The first story of the series was successful enough to generate seven more sequels and subsequently republished as a single volume collection through the Flint's Ring of Fire Press in 2018.
