= Rae Dawn Chong =

Canadian-American actress (born 1961)

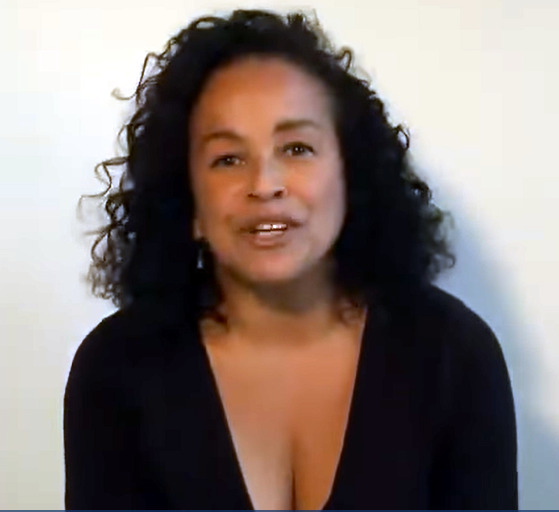
- Chong in 2013
- Born: February 28, 1961 (age 65); Edmonton, Alberta, Canada
- Occupation: Actress
- Years active: 1974–present
- Spouses: Owen Baylis (div. 1982) C. Thomas Howell (m. 1989; div. 1990) Nathan Ulrich (m. 2011; div. 2014)
- Children: 1
- Father: Tommy Chong

Rae Dawn Chong (born February 28, 1961) is a Canadian actress. She made her big screen debut appearing in the 1978 musical drama film Stony Island, and in 1981 starred in the science fantasy film Quest for Fire, for which she received the Genie Award for Best Actress.

Chong later starred in films Beat Street (1984), Choose Me (1984), American Flyers (1985), The Color Purple (1985), Commando (1985), Soul Man (1986), The Principal (1987), Tales from the Darkside: The Movie (1990), The Borrower (1991), Time Runner (1993), and Boulevard (1994). She is the daughter of comedian and actor Tommy Chong.

== Early life ==
Rae Dawn Chong was born on February 28, 1961, in Edmonton, Alberta, Canada, the first daughter of actor/comedian Tommy Chong. Her father is of Chinese and Scots-Irish descent. Her mother, Maxine Sneed, was of Black Canadian descent. Her maternal uncle was drummer Floyd Sneed. Her younger sister Robbi Chong is a model and actress. They have three younger half-brothers, one adopted, and a half-sister by their father's second wife. Two of her sisters and her adopted brother Marcus Chong have also pursued acting careers.

Chong has said that her paternal grandfather left a poor village in China in the 1930s to live with an aunt in Vancouver, where Chinese immigrants were mostly sequestered in a small area due to racial discrimination. Although he spoke Cantonese, he refused to teach it to his children or grandchildren. She said, "I think my grandfather had great racial shame, which was hard on us growing up. ... We grew up desperate to know anything about our Chinese culture." Later in life, though, her grandfather "saw the error of his ways and embraced his heritage."

== Career ==
After acting in a few television roles, Chong's second feature film was Quest for Fire (1981), for which she won the Genie Award for Best Performance by an Actress in a Leading Role in 1983. Other notable roles have been in the films Choose Me (1984), Beat Street (1984), The Color Purple alongside Oprah Winfrey and Commando with Arnold Schwarzenegger (both in 1985), and Soul Man (1986). She also appeared with her father in Cheech & Chong's The Corsican Brothers (1984) and Far Out Man (1990). In 1985, Chong played the love interest in Mick Jagger's video "Just Another Night".

At 19 years old, Chris Pratt was waiting tables at the Bubba Gump Shrimp Company restaurant in Maui when he was scouted by Chong; she cast him in her directorial debut, the short horror film Cursed Part 3, which was filmed in Los Angeles in 2000.

On television, Chong starred opposite Adrian Pasdar in the science fiction drama series Mysterious Ways from 2000 to 2002. In 2003, she starred in the first season of Lifetime comedy-drama series Wild Card opposite Joely Fisher. The following years, she appeared in a number of independent movies. She returned to television appearing in two episodes of Better Things in 2016 and two episodes of 9-1-1 (2018-19). In 2021, Chong played Betty Currie in the FX series Impeachment: American Crime Story. Also in the same year, she was honored with the "Invisible Woman Award" from the Women Film Critics Circle for "Supporting performance by a woman whose exceptional impact on the film dramatically, socially or historically, has been ignored" for her performance in the drama film The Sleeping Negro.

In 2022, Chong portrayed Florence de Pointe du Lac in the AMC series Interview with the Vampire.

== Personal life ==
Chong married Owen Baylis, a stockbroker, and they had a son named Morgan. They divorced in 1982. In 1989, she married actor C. Thomas Howell, her co-star in the feature film Soul Man. They divorced in 1990. In 2011, Chong married Nathan Ulrich, one of the founders of Xootr. They divorced in 2014.

Chong has spoken out against the genocide in Gaza in an Instagram post (September 15, 2026).

== Pop culture references ==
British-American rapper-producer MF Doom recorded a song titled "Rae Dawn". It was released under the alias Viktor Vaughn, as a single from his third studio album Vaudeville Villain. Some releases list the title as "Raedawn". The reference to Chong appears in the lyrics: "New drink, named it after Chong daughter".

Rapper Redman mentions Chong in his 1994 song "Winicumuhround".

Comedian Stephen Lynch also has a song about Chong—"R.D.C. (Opie's Lament)"—as the 12th track on his 2000 debut album A Little Bit Special.

Chong's name is repeated several times on the hidden track "Love Song" from Alice in Chains' 1992 EP Sap.

== Filmography ==
=== Film ===
Year	Title	Role	Notes
1978	Stony Island	Janetta	
1979	Top of the Hill	Rita	TV movie
1981	Quest for Fire	Ika	
1984	Beat Street	Tracy Carlson	
1984	Choose Me	Pearl Antoine	
1984	Fear City	Leila	
1984	Cheech & Chong's The Corsican Brothers	The Gypsy	
1984	City Limits	Yogi	
1985	American Flyers	Sarah	
1985	Running Out of Luck	Slave Girl	
1985	Commando	Cindy	
1985	Badge of the Assassin	Christine Horn	TV movie
1985	The Color Purple	Squeak	
1986	Soul Man	Sarah Walker	
1987	The Squeeze	Rachel Dobs	
1987	The Principal	Hilary Orozco	
1990	Far Out Man	Herself	
1990	Denial	Julie	
1990	Tales from the Darkside: The Movie	Carola	
1990	Curiosity Kills	Jane	TV movie
1990	Amazon	Paola	
1991	Prison Stories: Women on the Inside	Rhonda	TV movie
1991	The Borrower	Diana Pierce	
1991	Chaindance	Ilene Curtis	
1992	When the Party's Over	M.J.	
1993	Time Runner	Karen Donaldson	
1993	Father & Son: Dangerous Relations	Yvonne	TV movie
1994	Boulevard	Ola	
1994	Boca	J.J.	
1994	Amberwaves	Misty	
1995	Hideaway	Rose Orwetto	
1995	Power of Attorney	Joan Armstrong	Video
1995	The Break	Jennifer Hudson	
1995	Crying Freeman	Detective Forge	
1996	Mask of Death	Cassandra Turner	
1996	Starlight	Arianna	
1996	Small Time	The Woman	
1996	For Hope	Woman at Bar	TV movie
1997	Alibi	D.A. Linda Garcia	TV movie
1997	Goodbye America	Danzig	
1998	Valentine's Day	Sally	Video
1999	Cosas que olvidé recordar	Mary	
2000	Dangerous Attraction	Ann Rich	
2000	The Visit	Felicia	
2002	Highball	Herself	
2005	Constellation	Jenita	
2006	Max Havoc: Ring of Fire	Sister Caroline	Video
2006	Deadly Skies	Madison Taylor	TV movie
2010	Cyrus: Mind of a Serial Killer	Vivian	
2010	Etta, Kit, and Grace	Etta	Short
2011	Jeff, Who Lives at Home	Carol	
2012	Shiver	Detective Burdine	
2012	Pegasus vs. Chimera	Mayda	TV movie
2013	Mud Lotus	Kim	Short
2014	Knock 'em Dead	Jenny Logan	
2015	Drizzle Of Hope	Ms. Johnson	Short
2017	Five Minutes	Delores	Short
2018	Reborn	Dory Ryder	
2021	The Sleeping Negro	Black Woman	
2022	We Are Gathered Here Today	Mary Reed	
2022	The Mistress	Evelyn	
2024	Scared to Death	Ruth	
2025	Feel	Sitter 5	
2026	The Raven	Nurse Virginia	
2026	Moodswing Whiskey	Mama Marks	

=== Television ===
Year	Title	Role	Notes
1974	Walt Disney's Wonderful World of Color	Greta Bagley	Episode: "The Whiz Kid and the Mystery at Riverton: Part 1 & 2"
1980	Lou Grant	Adrienne	Episode: "Lou"
1983	St. Elsewhere	Hooker	Episode: "Monday, Tuesday, Sven's Day"
1984–85	St. Elsewhere	Billie Vaughn	Recurring Cast: Season 2, Guest: Season 3
1986	Tall Tales & Legends	Circe Lafemme	Episode: "Casey at the Bat"
1991	The Hitchhiker	Leesa White	Episode: "New Blood"
1992–93	Melrose Place	Carrie Fellows	Recurring Cast: Season 1
1994	Lonesome Dove: The Series	May Lawson	Episode: "Firebrand"
1995	The Outer Limits	Karen Heatherton	Episode: "Second Soul"
1996	Highlander: The Series	Claudia Jardine	Episode: "Timeless"
1997	Poltergeist: The Legacy	Tanya Moreau	Recurring Cast: Season 2
2000–02	Mysterious Ways	Dr. Peggy Fowler	Main Cast
2002	Judging Amy	Atty. Westland	Episode: "A Pretty Good Day"
2003–04	Wild Card	Sophie Mason	Main Cast: Season 1
2007	That's So Raven	Lynn Thomas	Episode: "The Way They Were"
2016	Better Things	Patty Donner	Recurring Cast: Season 1
2018–19	9-1-1	Stacey Mullins	Guest Cast: Season 2-3
2019	My Sister Is So Gay	Parker	Recurring Cast: Season 2
2021	Impeachment: American Crime Story	Betty Currie	Recurring Cast
2021	Saturday Morning All Star Hits!	Sheena Murphy	Recurring Cast
2022	Interview with the Vampire	Florence de Pointe du Lac	Recurring Cast: Season 1

=== Music videos ===
Year	Song	Artist	Role
1985	"Lucky in Love"	Mick Jagger	Woman
1985	"Just Another Night"	Mick Jagger	Girlfriend
1986	"Soul Man"	Lou Reed & Sam Moore	Herself

== Accolades ==
Year	Awards	Category	Recipient	Outcome
1981	Genie Awards	Genie Award for Best Actress	Quest for Fire	Won
2021	Women Film Critics Circle	Women Film Critics Circle Invisible Woman Award	The Sleeping Negro	Won
