= Eminem videography =

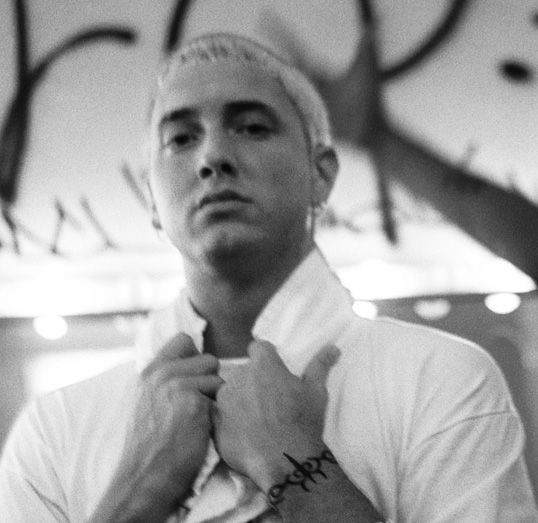
Eminem in 1999

American rapper Eminem has released five video albums and has featured in numerous music videos, as well as in various films and television shows. His first song to have an official music video was his first single "Just Don't Give A Fuck". Eminem subsequently starred in the music videos for songs such as "My Name Is", "The Real Slim Shady", "The Way I Am", "Stan", "Without Me", "Lose Yourself", "Mockingbird", "3 a.m.", "Beautiful", "Not Afraid", "Love the Way You Lie", "Rap God", "The Monster", "Walk On Water", "River", "Venom", "Godzilla" and "Houdini".

After small roles in the 2001 film The Wash and as an extra in the 1998 Korn music video for "Got the Life" (during which he gave the band a demo tape), Eminem made his Hollywood debut in the semi-autobiographical 2002 film 8 Mile. He said it was a representation of growing up in Detroit rather than an account of his life. Eminem recorded several new songs for the soundtrack, including "Lose Yourself".

He voiced an aging, corrupt, African American Vernacular English-speaking police officer in the video game 50 Cent: Bulletproof and guested on the Comedy Central television show Crank Yankers and a Web cartoon, The Slim Shady Show. Eminem had a cameo appearance, arguing with Ray Romano, in the 2009 film Funny People. He played himself in the Entourage season-seven finale "Lose Yourself" with Christina Aguilera. Eminem had a cameo appearance as himself in the 2014 film The Interview.

== Video albums ==
Title	Album details	Notes
The Up in Smoke Tour	Released: December 5, 2000; Label: RED Distribution, Eagle Rock (30001); Format: DVD, UMD, VHS	The Up in Smoke Tour is a concert film of a concert held in Worcester, Massachusetts as part of the 2000 Up in Smoke Tour. It features live performances as well as backstage content from various rappers, including Dr. Dre, Snoop Dogg, Ice Cube and Eminem. The film, rendered for DVD in Dolby Digital 5.1 audio compression, is directed by Philip G. Atwell and narrated by Dr. Dre.
E	Released: December 12, 2000; Label: Aftermath, Interscope, PolyGram Video (60819); Format: DVD, VHS	E features seven director's cut versions of Eminem's music videos released up to 2000, as well as footage of the making of the "Stan" video. All songs are taken from his second and third studio albums The Slim Shady LP and The Marshall Mathers LP.
All Access Europe	Released: June 18, 2002; Label: Interscope (493313)	Directed by John 'Quig' Quigley, All Access Europe documents Eminem's European tour to promote The Marshall Mathers LP. The video album is divided in segments based on the concert locations, which included Hamburg, Oslo, Paris, London, and other European destinations.
Eminem Presents the Anger Management Tour	Released: June 28, 2005; Label: Interscope (9883138)	Eminem Presents: The Anger Management Tour, directed by Donn J. Viola, highlights the 2002 concert in Detroit, part of the Anger Management Tour. The concert features performances from Eminem and the Shady Records roster, as well as backstage footage and a free download option of the "Ass Like That" music video with the purchase of the DVD.
Live from New York City	Released: December 3, 2005; Label: Showtime (TV), Eagle Rock (DVD – 302339); Format: TV broadcast (2005), DVD (2007), Blu-ray (2009)	Live from New York City 2005 is Eminem's fourth and to-date final concert film. The film documents his 2005 live concert at the Madison Square Garden in New York, part of the Anger Management Tour 3. The taped event, directed by Hamish Hamilton, originally premiered on Showtime on December 3, 2005, while the DVD was released on November 13, 2007.

== Music videos ==
Year	Title	Director(s)	Artist(s)
As main performer
1998	"Just Don't Give A Fuck"	Darren Lavett	—N/a
1999	"My Name Is"	Dr. Dre and Phillip Atwell	—N/a
1999	"Guilty Conscience"	Dr. Dre and Phillip Atwell	featuring Dr. Dre
1999	"Role Model"	Dr. Dre and Phillip Atwell	—N/a
2000	"The Real Slim Shady"	Dr. Dre and Phillip Atwell	—N/a
2000	"The Way I Am"	Paul Hunter	—N/a
2000	"Stan"	Dr. Dre and Phillip G. Atwell	featuring Dido
2002	"Without Me"	Joseph Kahn	—N/a
2002	"White America"	Animated	—N/a
2002	"Cleaning Out My Closet"	Dr. Dre and Phillip G. Atwell	—N/a
2002	"Lose Yourself"	Eminem, Paul Rosenberg and Phillip G. Atwell	—N/a
2003	"Superman"	Paul Hunter	—N/a
2003	"Sing for the Moment"	Phillip G. Atwell and Jeff Grippe	—N/a
2004	"Mosh"	Ian Inaba (Animated)	—N/a
2004	"Just Lose It"	Phillip G. Atwell	—N/a
2004	"Like Toy Soldiers"	The Saline Project	—N/a
2005	"Mockingbird"	Eminem, Quig	—N/a
2005	"Ass Like That"	Phillip G. Atwell	—N/a
2005	"When I'm Gone"	Anthony Mandler	—N/a
2006	"Shake That"	Plates Animation (Animated)	featuring Nate Dogg
2006	"You Don't Know"	The Saline Project	featuring 50 Cent, Cashis and Lloyd Banks
2009	"Crack a Bottle"	Syndrome	featuring Dr. Dre and 50 Cent
2009	"We Made You"	Joseph Kahn	—N/a
2009	"3 a.m."	Syndrome	—N/a
2009	"Beautiful"	Anthony Mandler	—N/a
2010	"Not Afraid"	Rich Lee	—N/a
2010	"Love the Way You Lie"	Joseph Kahn	featuring Rihanna
2010	"No Love"	Chris Robinson	featuring Lil Wayne
2011	"Space Bound"	Joseph Kahn	—N/a
2013	"Berzerk"	Syndrome	—N/a
2013	"Survival"	Syndrome	—N/a
2013	"Rap God"	Rich Lee	—N/a
2013	"The Monster"	Rich Lee	featuring Rihanna
2014	"Headlights"	Spike Lee	featuring Nate Ruess (does not appear in video)
2014	"Shady CXVPHER"	James Larese	with Slaughterhouse and Yelawolf
2014	"Guts Over Fear"	Syndrome	featuring Sia (does not appear in video)
2015	"Detroit vs. Everybody"	James Larese	with Royce da 5'9", Big Sean, Danny Brown, Dej Loaf, Trick-Trick
2015	"Phenomenal"	Rich Lee	—N/a
2017	"Walk on Water"	Rich Lee	featuring Beyoncé (does not appear in video)
2018	"River"	Emil Nava	featuring Ed Sheeran
2018	"Framed"	James Larese	—N/a
2018	"Fall"	James Larese	—N/a
2018	"Lucky You"	James Larese	featuring Joyner Lucas
2018	"Venom"	Rich Lee	—N/a
2018	"Good Guy"	Peter Huang	featuring Jessie Reyez
2020	"Darkness"	James Larese	—N/a
2020	"Godzilla"	Cole Bennett	featuring Juice WRLD (video filmed after Juice WRLD's death)
2020	"Gnat"	Cole Bennett	—N/a
2021	"Higher"	James Larese	—N/a
2022	"From the D 2 the LBC"	James Larese	with Snoop Dogg
2024	"Doomsday Pt. 2"	Cole Bennett	cameos from: Big Sean, BabyTron, Denzel Curry, Teezo Touchdown, JID, Swae Lee and Cordae
2024	"Houdini"	Rich Lee	—N/a
2024	"Tobey"	Cole Bennett	with Big Sean and BabyTron
2024	"Somebody Save Me"	Emil Nava	featuring Jelly Roll
2024	"Temporary"	Eminem	featuring Skylar Grey

As featured performer
1999	"The Anthem"		Sway & King Tech featuring RZA, Tech N9ne, Xzibit, Pharoahe Monch, Kool G Rap, Jayo Felony, Chino XL and KRS-One
2000	"Forgot About Dre"	Phillip G. Atwell	Dr. Dre
2001	"Don't Approach Me"	(Backstage video)	Xzibit
2001	"Fight Music"	Marc Klasfeld	
2002	"Rock City"		Royce da 5'9"
2005	"Welcome 2 Detroit"	unknown	Trick-Trick
2005	"Gatman and Robbin"	unknown	50 Cent
2006	"Smack That"	Benny Boom	Akon
2009	"Forever"	Hype Williams	Drake, Kanye West, Lil Wayne
2010	"Drop the World"	Chris Robinson	Lil Wayne
2011	"I Need a Doctor"	Allen Hughes	Dr. Dre, Skylar Grey
2011	"Fast Lane"	James Larese	Bad Meets Evil
2011	"Lighters"	Rich Lee	Bad Meets Evil, Bruno Mars
2012	"My Life"	Rich Lee	50 Cent, Adam Levine
2012	"C'mon Let Me Ride"	Isaac Rentz	Skylar Grey
2015	"Best Friend"		Yelawolf
2018	"Caterpillar"	James Larese	Royce da 5'9", King Green
2019	"Rainy Days"	James Larese	Boogie
2019	"Homicide"		Logic
2024	"Murdergram Deux"	@jaketheshooter	LL Cool J
Cameo appearances (No vocals, just brief appearance in the video.)
1993	"Do Da Dipity"		Champtown
1998	"Got the Life "	McG	Korn
1999	"Still D.R.E."	Hype Williams	Dr. Dre featuring Snoop Dogg
1999	"Just Dippin'"		Snoop Dogg featuring Dr. Dre and Jewell
1999	"I Declare War"		Pacewon
2000	"Break Stuff"		Limp Bizkit
2000	"Get Your Walk On"	Smith N Borin'	Xzibit
2002	"Rap Name"		Obie Trice
2003	"In Da Club"	Phillip G. Atwell	50 Cent
2003	"Got Some Teeth"		Obie Trice
2005	"I'm Supposed to Die Tonight"		50 Cent
2005	"Hush Is Coming"		Hush
2005	"Rockstar"		Bizarre
2006	"Snitch"		Obie Trice featuring Akon
2009	"Get Up"		50 Cent
2011	"Memory Lane"		Elzhi
2012	"Hammer Dance"		Slaughterhouse
2012	"My Life"		Slaughterhouse featuring CeeLo Green
2012	"Throw It Away"		Slaughterhouse featuring Swizz Beatz

== Filmography ==
Film
Year	Film	Role	Notes
2000	Da Hip Hop Witch	Himself	
2001	The Wash	Chris	Uncredited
2002	8 Mile	Jimmy "B-Rabbit" Smith Jr.	Semi-autobiographical film, also composer and executive soundtrack producer; Academy Award for Best Original Song ("Lose Yourself"); ASCAP Award for Most Performed Song from a Motion Picture ("Lose Yourself"); BMI Film Award for Music; BMI Film Award for Most Performed Song from a Film ("Lose Yourself"); Critics Choice Award for Best Song ("Lose Yourself"); MTV Movie Award for Best Video from a Film ("Lose Yourself"); MTV Movie Award for Best Male Performance; MTV Movie Award for Best Breakthrough Male Performance; Teen Choice Award for Choice Movie Actor – Drama/Action Adventure; Teen Choice Award for Choice Movie Breakout Star – Male; (Nominated) CFCA Award for Most Promising Performer; (Nominated) Golden Globe for Best Original Song from a Motion Picture ("Lose Yourself"); (Nominated) Golden Satellite for Best Original Song ("Lose Yourself"); (Nominated) Grammy Award for Best Song Written for a Motion Picture, Television or Other Visual Media ("Lose Yourself"); (Nominated) OFCS for Best Breakthrough Performance (Nominated) PFCS for Best Original Song ("Lose Yourself")
2009	Funny People	Himself	Cameo
2014	The Interview	Himself	Cameo
2017	Bodied	—N/a	Producer
2025	Happy Gilmore 2	Donald Jr.	Cameo
2025	Stans	Himself	Documentary, also producer

Television
Year	Title	Role	Notes
1999; 2000; 2002; 2004; 2010; 2013; 2017; 2020; 2022	Saturday Night Live	Musical guest/cameo	Season 25, Episode 3: "Norm Macdonald/Dr. Dre, Snoop Dogg & Eminem" Season 26, Episode 1: "Rob Lowe/Eminem"; Season 27, Episode 19: "Kirsten Dunst/Eminem"; Season 30, Episode 4: "Kate Winslet/Eminem"; Season 36, Episode 10: "Jeff Bridges/Eminem & Lil Wayne"; Season 39, Episode 5: "Kerry Washington/Eminem"; Season 43, Episode 6: "Chance the Rapper/Eminem"; Season 46, Episode 7: "Jason Bateman/Morgan Wallen; Season 47, Episode 21: "Natasha Lyonne/Japanese Breakfast
2000	The Slim Shady Show	Eminem, Marshall Mathers, Slim Shady, Ken Kaniff	Web series
2004	Crank Yankers	Billy Fletcher	Season 3, Episode 1: "Eminem & Tracy Morgan"
2010	Entourage	Himself	Season 7, Episode 10: "Lose Yourself"
2013	Detroit Rubber	Himself	Web series Season 1, Episode 1: "Pilot"; Also executive producer
2021	BMF	White Boy Rick	Drama series Season 1, Episode 7: "All in the Family"

Documentaries
Year	Title
2003	50 Cent: The New Breed
2012	Something from Nothing: The Art of Rap
2012	How to Make Money Selling Drugs
2015	Not Afraid: The Shady Records Story
2015	Stretch and Bobbito: Radio That Changed Lives
2017	The Defiant Ones
2020	LA Originals
2023	Dear Mama
2024	How Music Got Free
2025	Stans

Concert films
Year	Film	Role	Notes
2000	The Up In Smoke Tour	Headline	Released with Dr. Dre, Snoop Dogg and Ice Cube
2005	Eminem Presents: The Anger Management Tour	Headline	Concert at The Palace of Auburn Hills in Detroit with D12, Obie Trice and Dina Rae
2005	Live from New York City	Headline	Concert at Madison Square Garden with D12, Obie Trice, Stat Quo and The Alchemist.

Video games
Year	Film	Role	Notes
2005	50 Cent: Bulletproof	Detective McVicar	Voice and likeness
2015	Shady Wars	Himself	Likeness
2023	Fortnite Battle Royale	Himself	
2025	Hitman 3	Himself / Slim Shady	Voice and likeness
