= Nice Guy (Eminem and Jessie Reyez song) =

Eminem song

Song by Eminem and Jessie Reyez

from the album Kamikaze
- Released: August 31, 2018
- Studio: Effigy Studios (Detroit, MI)
- Genre: Industrial hip hop
- Length: 2:30
- Label: Shady
- Songwriters: Marshall Mathers; Jessie Reyez; Fred Ball; Larry Griffin Jr.; Luis Resto
- Producers: Fred Ball; Symbolyc One; Eminem (add.)

"Nice Guy" is a song by American rapper Eminem and Canadian singer Jessie Reyez from the former's tenth studio album Kamikaze, released on August 31, 2018, via Shady Records. Produced by Fred Ball and Symbolyc One with additional production by Eminem, recording sessions took place at Effigy Studios in Detroit. Despite never being released as a single, the song has managed to chart in several countries.

== Critical reception ==
Aja Romano of Vox wrote: "'Nice Guy' and 'Good Guy' both trade on the popular conception of the "nice guy" as an embodiment of the kind of entitled misogyny that leads to the violence we see in "Normal". It's not exactly groundbreaking, and as always, it's so difficult to uncouple Em's critique of misogyny from actual misogyny that it might as well be one and the same". Craig Jenkins of Vulture.com wrote: "The methodical Jessie Reyez raps on "Nice Guy" nudge the marquee artist toward pointed story raps that revisit his old glory, when songs gripped with emotion and honesty, not just a barrage of internal rhymes. The melodic relationship raps on the back end of "Normal" pose the question of how much better this half of Eminem's decade could've gone had he poured himself into collaborations with guys like Drake and Future instead of writing their entire wing of rap off as heralds of some coming real hip-hop apocalypse".

== Personnel ==
- Marshall Mathers – vocals, additional producer, mixing, songwriter
- Jessie Reyez – vocals, songwriter
- Larry Griffin Jr. – producer, songwriter
- Fred Ball – producer, songwriter
- Luis Resto – additional keyboards, songwriter
- Mike Strange – recording, mixing
- Joe Strange – recording
- Tony Campana – recording

== Charts ==
Chart (2018)	Peak position
Australia (ARIA)	48
Austria (Ö3 Austria Top 40)	74
Canada Hot 100 (Billboard)	53
Czech Republic Singles Digital (ČNS IFPI)	63
France (SNEP)	168
Slovakia Singles Digital (ČNS IFPI)	33
Sweden (Sverigetopplistan)	82
US Billboard Hot 100	65
US Hot R&B/Hip-Hop Songs (Billboard)	31

== Certifications ==
Certifications for "Nice Guy"
Region	Certification	Certified units/sales
Australia (ARIA)	Gold	35,000^{‡}
^{‡} Sales+streaming figures based on certification alone.
