= Venom (soundtrack) =

Venom (Original Motion Picture Soundtrack)

Film score by Ludwig Göransson
- Released: October 5, 2018
- Length: 55:22
- Label: Sony Classical

Ludwig Göransson chronology
Slice (2018)	Venom (2018)	Creed II (Original Motion Picture Soundtrack) (2018)

Venom (Original Motion Picture Soundtrack) is the soundtrack for the 2018 American superhero film Venom, based on the Marvel Comics character of the same name and produced by Columbia Pictures, consists of an original score composed by Ludwig Göransson and a series of songs featured in the film. Göransson was hired after previously working with director Ruben Fleischer, and after his successful work in the superhero genre for Marvel Studios' Black Panther earlier that year.

Eminem released "Venom" as part of his tenth studio album Kamikaze on August 31, 2018, and as a single on September 21. Göransson's score was released by Sony Classical Records on October 5.

== Background ==
Ludwig Göransson signed on to compose the score for Venom in March 2018, reuniting with Fleischer after the pair worked together on the 2011 film 30 Minutes or Less. Having composed the music for Marvel Studios' Black Panther (2018), Göransson said he was interested in continuing to explore music for superhero films because "as a young film composer that is one of the things you dream of ... superhero themes really resonate with audiences."

== Release and track listing ==
=== Singles ===
Three additional songs, "Venom" by American rapper Eminem, "No Problem" by American rapper Pusha T and "Let's Go (The Royal We)" by American hip hop duo Run the Jewels are featured in the film, but are not included on the soundtrack album.

=== Venom (Original Motion Picture Soundtrack) ===
All music composed by Ludwig Göransson.

No.	Title	Length
1.	"Space Exploration"	4:24
2.	"Symbiotes Arrive"	2:03
3.	"First Contact"	3:29
4.	"Eddie's Blues"	4:50
5.	"Run, Eddie, Run"	1:47
6.	"What's Wrong with Me"	2:33
7.	"Panic at the Bistro"	1:23
8.	"Humans... Such Poor Design"	2:55
9.	"Self Defense"	3:38
10.	"Pedal To The Metal"	3:50
11.	"Eyes, Lungs, Pancreas"	2:45
12.	"You Want Up?"	1:40
13.	"Venom Rampage"	3:03
14.	"Annie, I'm Scared"	1:47
15.	"Parasite"	2:57
16.	"Unexpected Ally"	0:51
17.	"Battle on the Launch Pad"	8:18
18.	"You Belong With Us"	3:09
Total length:		55:22
