= Eminem Presents: The Anger Management Tour =

2005 concert film

The Anger Management Tour

Video concert film by Eminem
- Released: June 28, 2005
- Recorded: September 8, 2002
- Venue: The Palace of Auburn Hills (Detroit, MI)
- Genre: Hip hop
- Label: Aftermath
- Producer: Eminem (exec.); Paul Rosenberg (exec.); Stuart Parr (exec.)

Eminem chronology
All Access Europe (2002)	The Anger Management Tour (2005)	Live from New York City (2005)

Professional ratings
Review scores
Source	Rating
AllMusic	3/5 stars

The Anger Management Tour is a concert film directed by Donn J. Viola, documenting American rapper Eminem's live concert at The Palace of Auburn Hills in Detroit as part of his second Anger Management Tour. The taped event, also featuring D12, Obie Trice and Dina Rae, was recorded on September 8, 2002, and released on June 28, 2005, via Aftermath Entertainment.

The second edition of Anger Management Tour concerts, including The Anger Management Tour, were in support of Eminem's fourth solo studio album The Eminem Show.

== Track listing ==
No.	Title	Length
1.	"Square Dance"
2.	"Business"
3.	"White America"
4.	"Kill You"
5.	"When the Music Stop" (performed by D12)
6.	"Pimp Like Me" (performed by D12)
7.	"Fight Music" (performed by D12)
8.	"Purple Pills" (performed by D12)
9.	"Stan"
10.	"The Way I Am"
11.	"Soldier"
12.	"Cleanin' Out My Closet"
13.	"Forgot About Dre"
14.	"Drips" (featuring Obie Trice)
15.	"Superman" (featuring Dina Rae)
16.	"Drug Ballad" (featuring Dina Rae)
17.	"Just Don't Give a Fuck"
18.	"Sing for the Moment"
19.	"Without Me"
20.	"My Dad's Gone Crazy"

== Charts ==
Chart (2005)	Peak position
Australian DVD chart (ARIA Charts)	5
German Albums (Offizielle Top 100)	49
Dutch Music DVD (MegaCharts)	15
US Music Video Sales (Billboard)	2

== Certifications ==
Region	Certification	Certified units/sales
Australia (ARIA)	Gold	7,500^{^}
New Zealand (RMNZ)	Gold	2,500^{^}
^{^} Shipments figures based on certification alone.
