= Gotta Get Away (The Offspring song) =

1995 single by the Offspring

Single by the Offspring

from the album Smash
- B-side: "Smash" (live)
- Released: February 2, 1995
- Genre: Punk rock; alternative rock; power pop
- Length: 3:53
- Label: Epitaph
- Songwriter: Dexter Holland
- Producer: Thom Wilson

The Offspring singles chronology
"Self Esteem" (1994)	"Gotta Get Away" (1995)	"Smash It Up" (1995)

Alternative Cover
- Vinyl Cover

"Gotta Get Away" is a song by American rock band the Offspring. It is the fourth track and third single from their breakthrough album, Smash (1994). The song was a modest hit in several countries and peaked at No. 6 on the US Billboard Modern Rock Tracks chart. "Gotta Get Away" was inspired by an early track, "Cogs", written while the band was still named Manic Subsidal. Although the song was a big hit, it did not reach the heights nor achieve the popularity, success, airplay, or sales of the album's previous singles "Come Out and Play" and "Self Esteem".

The song has two single covers. The first, the cover for the CD single, depicts a skeleton in the same style as the previous singles from Smash: "Come Out and Play" and "Self Esteem". The second, the cover for the 7-inch vinyl, shows the actor from the video standing outside the coliseum, his eyes covered by the song title. The song also appears as the same numbered track on the Offpsring's Greatest Hits (2005).

== Composition and lyrics ==
"Gotta Get Away" has been described as a punk rock, alternative rock and power pop song. The lyrics refer to the pressure that lead singer Dexter Holland was under to finish the album on time. He told Rolling Stone:

We were at Track Record Studios in North Hollywood with [producer] Thom Wilson, and we were writing up to the last minute. We didn’t have a lot of time to finish the record and we didn’t have a lot of money. [...] The last two nights I still had four songs left to do. I’d go in, spend a few hours writing a lyric, then a few hours singing it. Then I’d do it again. I remember “It’ll Be a Long Time” and “Smash” happened on those days. I was there until five in the morning trying to get everything done.

== Music video ==
The music video for the song was directed by Samuel Bayer and filmed at the Fairgrounds Coliseum in Salt Lake City, UT on December 17, 1994. The video starts with a boy entering a coliseum where a mosh pit breaks out while the band plays. It is predominantly in black and white. The video ends with the same boy lying on the floor alone. The music video appears on the Complete Music Video Collection DVD, released in 2005.

== Track listings ==
CD single

No.	Title	Length
1.	"Gotta Get Away"	3:56
2.	"We Are One"	4:00
3.	"Forever and a Day"	2:37

Swedish CD maxi and U.K. 7-inch black vinyl

No.	Title	Length
1.	"Gotta Get Away"	3:56
2.	"Smash" (Live version)	3:01

== Personnel ==
=== The Offspring ===
- Dexter Holland – vocals, guitar
- Noodles – guitar, backing vocals
- Greg K. – bass
- Ron Welty – drums

== Charts ==
=== Weekly charts ===
Chart (1995)	Peak position
Australia (ARIA)	53
Australia Alternative (ARIA)	8
Austria (Ö3 Austria Top 40)	36
Belgium (Ultratop 50 Flanders)	28
Belgium (Ultratop 50 Wallonia)	21
Canada Top Singles (RPM)	32
European Hot 100 Singles (Music & Media)	54
European Alternative Rock Radio (Music & Media)	8
Finland (Suomen virallinen lista)	6
Netherlands (Dutch Top 40)	37
Netherlands (Single Top 100)	33
Norway (VG-lista)	18
Scottish Singles Sales (Official Charts)	46
Sweden (Sverigetopplistan)	26
UK Singles (Official Charts)	43
UK Rock & Metal (Official Charts)	1
US Radio Songs (Billboard)	58
US Alternative Airplay (Billboard)	6
US Mainstream Rock (Billboard)	15

=== Year-end charts ===
Chart (1995)	Position
US Album Rock Tracks (Billboard)	40

== Release history ==
Region	Date	Format(s)	Label(s)	Ref.
Europe	February 2, 1995	CD	Epitaph	
United Kingdom	August 7, 1995	7-inch vinyl; CD; cassette	Out of Step	
