= E (video) =

2000 music video collection DVD by Eminem

Video by Eminem
- Released: December 12, 2000
- Recorded: 1998–2000
- Genres: Hardcore hip-hop; horrorcore; comedy hip-hop
- Length: 52:57
- Labels: Aftermath; Interscope
- Directors: Phillip Atwell; Dr. Dre; Darren Lavett; Paul Hunter; Damon Johnson
- Producers: Dr. Dre (exec.); Phillip Atwell (exec.); Chris Palladino; Damon Johnson; Nigel Sarrag; Nina Huang; Anna Rambo; Courtney Holt; Leo Rossi; Melinda Pepler

Eminem chronology
The Up in Smoke Tour (2000)	E (2000)	All Access Europe (2002)

Professional ratings
Review scores
Source	Rating
AllMusic	4/5 stars

E (styled as Ǝ) is a compilation video album by American rapper Eminem, released in DVD and VHS formats. It was released on December 12, 2000, through Aftermath and Interscope Records. It is composed of seven music videos from The Slim Shady LP and The Marshall Mathers LP, the making of the "Stan" video, a short movie titled "The Mathers Home" and a hidden "Shit on You" video from D12's then-upcoming album Devil's Night. Ǝ peaked at number 5 on the Billboard's Music Video Sales chart and was certified Platinum by the Recording Industry Association of America. It was also certified Platinum by Music Canada and 2× Platinum by British Phonographic Industry.

== Track listing ==
No.	Title	Film director(s)	Length
1.	"Stan"	Philip G. Atwell; Dr. Dre	8:16
2.	"The Way I Am"	Paul Hunter	5:03
3.	"The Real Slim Shady"	Philip G. Atwell; Dr. Dre	4:29
4.	"Role Model"	Philip G. Atwell; Dr. Dre	3:59
5.	"Guilty Conscience"	Philip G. Atwell; Dr. Dre	3:35
6.	"My Name Is"	Philip G. Atwell; Dr. Dre	4:10
7.	"Just Don't Give a Fuck"	Darren Lavett	3:50
8.	"Stan: Behind the Scenes"	Damon Johnson	8:43
9.	"The Mathers Home"	Phillip G. Atwell	5:26
10.	"Shit on You"		5:26
Total length:			52:57

== Charts ==
Chart (2000–03)	Peak position
Australian DVD chart (ARIA Charts)	8
US Music Video Sales (Billboard)	5

== Certifications ==
Region	Certification	Certified units/sales
Australia (ARIA)	Platinum	15,000^{^}
Canada (Music Canada)	Platinum	10,000^{^}
United Kingdom (BPI)	2× Platinum	100,000^{^}
United States (RIAA)	Platinum	100,000^{^}
^{^} Shipments figures based on certification alone.
