= Kamikaze (Eminem album) =

2018 studio album

Studio album by Eminem
- Released: August 31, 2018
- Recorded: January–August 2018
- Studios: Effigy (Detroit); Heaven (Detroit); Record One (Los Angeles)
- Genres: Hip-hop; trap
- Length: 45:49
- Labels: Shady; Goliath; Aftermath; Interscope
- Producers: Eminem (also exec.); Swish Allnet; Fred Ball; Boi-1da; Illa da Producer; Jeremy Miller; Tay Keith; LoneStarrMuzik; Mike Will Made It; Luis Resto; Ronny J; S1; Tim Suby; Jahaan Sweet

Eminem chronology
Revival (2017)	Kamikaze (2018)	Music to Be Murdered By (2020)

Singles from Kamikaze
- 1. "Fall" Released: September 4, 2018; 2. "Venom" Released: September 21, 2018; 3. "Lucky You" Released: November 30, 2018

Kamikaze is the tenth studio album by the American rapper Eminem, released on August 31, 2018, by Shady Records, Goliath Artists, Aftermath Entertainment, and Interscope Records. The album, executive produced by Eminem and Dr. Dre, was released with no prior announcement just eight months after his previous album, Revival, in retaliation to the backlash it received. It features guest appearances from Joyner Lucas, Royce da 5'9", and Jessie Reyez. Production on the album was handled by Eminem, Luis Resto, Boi-1da, Tay Keith, Ronny J, Mike Will Made It, amongst others.

Following the polarizing reception of Revival, music journalists debated over whether Eminem's relevance and ability were waning. Kamikaze represents a response, containing various insults against critics and rappers alike. The artwork is an homage to Beastie Boys' debut album, Licensed to Ill (1986). Critical reception towards Kamikaze ranged from mixed to positive. Some praised it as an improvement over Revival and a welcome return to Eminem's more aggressive persona, while others criticized him for failing to adapt to the current sound of hip-hop, and found the album outdated as a result. It also generated some controversy for its diss tracks against various artists.

Kamikaze was promoted with three singles: "Fall", "Venom" (from the 2018 film of the same name), and "Lucky You", and a music video for "Good Guy", along with a supporting tour. Commercially, the album reached number one in 21 countries, becoming Eminem's ninth consecutive number-one album in the United States, and later becoming the best-selling hip-hop album of 2018. It sold 434,000 album-equivalent units in its first week in the US and later received a platinum certification by the Recording Industry Association of America (RIAA).

== Recording and release ==
On January 8, 2018, Eminem unexpectedly released a remix to his Revival song "Chloraseptic", featuring 2 Chainz and Phresher. In the song, Eminem mocked critics of Revival, concluding "I just added to the fuel in my rocket pack, till I'm ready to respond then I'ma launch it at 'em... I'll be back..." On January 22, 2018, photos revealed Mike Will Made-It in the studio with Eminem and Dr. Dre. During the Revival sessions, S1 tried to work with Eminem but he refused; the producer kept sending him beats to use on future tracks that the rapper incorporated into Kamikaze songs. The afternoon before Kamikaze's release, Eminem posted a 15-second teaser of a new song on social media, featuring the logo for the superhero film Venom, without comment.

On August 31, 2018, he released the album to digital music stores and streaming services without any promotion or pre-announcement, unlike the extensive marketing done for Revival; he would repeat the strategy with 2020's Music to Be Murdered By. Billboard credits the success of the surprise release to Beyoncé's self-titled fifth studio album released in December 2013 without any promotion or pre-announcement, which was a critical and commercial success, ultimately changing the global release day for music from Tuesday to Friday. The album was sold on his website in several formats, including bundled with merchandise such as apparel. Eminem used social media services such as Instagram and Twitter to announce the release and has relied on the extensive feedback from diss tracks and Internet hype to spread the word of the album. Several weeks after the album's release and subsequent commercial success, Eminem took out a full-page ad in The Hollywood Reporter mocking negative reviews of Kamikaze, including The Hollywood Reporter's review itself.

Although he had no marketing prior to the debut, Eminem had previously debuted freestyle rap "The Storm" at the 2017 BET Hip Hop Awards using similar lyrics to the eventual title track and he directly referred to his experience performing it on "The Ringer". He debuted a clothing line featuring "The Kamikaze" t-shirt the month prior. Producer Illa da Producer sees the album as similar to The Slim Shady LP in terms of its ferocity, rather than the subdued Revival.

American singer Justin Vernon of Bon Iver, whose vocals were uncredited on the song "Fall", disavowed his participation in the album, claiming that he was not in the studio when the recording was made. A music video for "Fall" was released on September 4, 2018, addressing criticism of Revival. The music video was directed by James Larese, who previously directed the music videos of "Framed" and "Caterpillar". A second video was released for "Lucky You" on September 13, 2018, followed by one for "Venom" on October 5, 2018, as well as one for "Good Guy" on December 7, 2018.

== Artwork ==
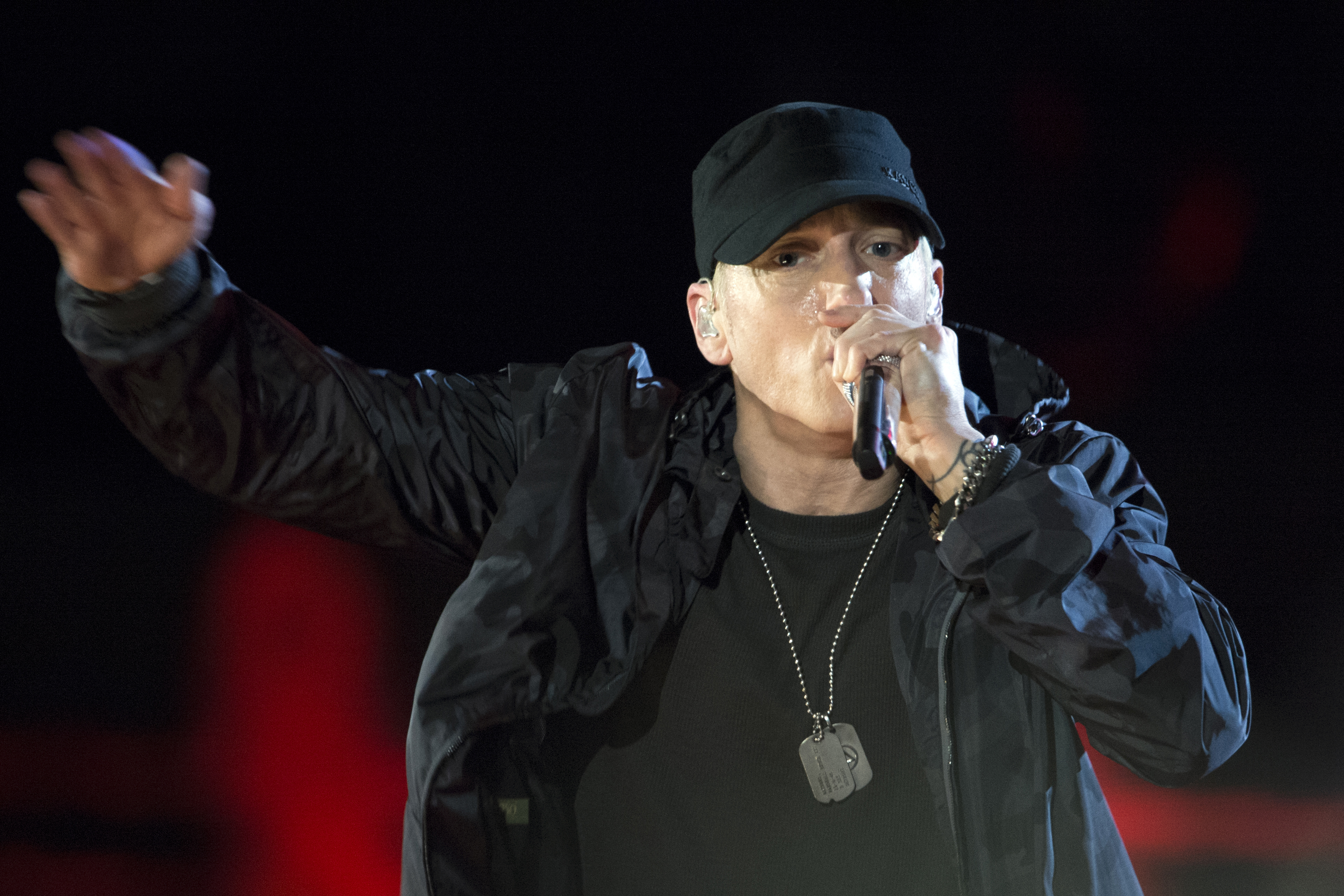
Eminem in 2014, sporting dog tags and a patrol cap; the military imagery is reproduced on the artwork for Kamikaze

The full album cover, front to back, features fighter pilot LT. Mathers III intentionally crashing an F-86 Sabre fighter jet into an unknown object. The artwork appropriates the cover design of the 1986 Beastie Boys album, Licensed to Ill; Eminem has cited them as an inspiration for several years but did not give the band any prior consultation for the cover homage. However, despite this, the Beastie Boys themselves seemed to react positively to this, with Mike D saying "We feel flattered." Promotion for the album featured the same artwork in full, including the Eminem logo with added Japanese writing, neither of which was included on the album cover design made by Mike Saputo.

Promotion for the second single "Venom" featured the logo from the film of the same name. The "E" in "VENOM" was replaced with the "Ǝ" character Eminem frequently uses on his artwork.

== Critical reception ==
Professional ratings
Aggregate scores
Source	Rating
AnyDecentMusic?	5.6/10
Metacritic	62/100
Review scores
Source	Rating
AllMusic	2/5 stars
The Daily Telegraph	4/5 stars
Consequence of Sound	B−
The Guardian	3/5 stars
HipHopDX	3.9/5
NME	3/5 stars
Pitchfork	5.0/10
PopMatters	7/10
Rolling Stone	2.5/5 stars
Vice (Expert Witness)	B+

According to the review aggregator Metacritic, Kamikaze received "generally favorable reviews" based on a weighted average score of 62 out of 100 from 16 critic scores. Aggregator AnyDecentMusic? gave the album 5.6 out of 10, based on their assessment of the critical consensus. Other assessments of the critical consensus have been mixed.

Aja Romano of Vox called the album Eminem's best in years, citing a return to the rapper's old school sound after deviating with Revival. Ed Power of The Daily Telegraph also compared this album to Revival, calling Kamikaze a "high-kicking, low-punching riposte", indicating it is a better release. Similarly, A. D. Amorosi of Variety sees the album as similar to Eminem's earlier work, stating, "[his] voice hasn't sounded quite so cranky, silly, impassioned or enraged since his early days" and for XXL, Scott Glaysher calls the album a revisit of the Slim Shady persona. For Consequence of Sound, Dedrick Hendrix gave the album a B−, summing up, "As a whole, the album may not be impeccable, but it’s the best he's released since 2010." M. Oliver of PopMatters summed up his review, "Kamikaze is Slim Shady at his midlife best; slightly less deviant, not quite as funny—but revived, nonetheless" and gave the album seven out of 10. Kitty Empire wrote for The Observer that Eminem is in "full rabid underdog mode" at a time when hip-hop MCs are more relaxed, giving the album three out of five stars. At HipHopDX, Trent Clark gave the album a 3.9 out of five, contrasting the work with Revival and denying this is a return to form, summing up, "After being faced with nothing to prove as the highest-selling rapper of all-time, Eminem’s found another challenge in perfecting the new style he’s put on display". Writing for Vice, Robert Christgau regarded the album as being "about hip-hop, his truest passion and sole area of undeniable expertise, rather than the larger emotional and political themes of what he conceived as a groundbreaking statement of principle [with Revival]". In The Atlantic, Spencer Kornhaber addresses both comparisons with Revival and current hip-hop stars on Kamikaze stating, "Really, though, Eminem is waging a war over aesthetics, and Kamikaze is a better listen than Revival because its concision confirms Eminem's value as an entertainer... Certainly, it's refreshing that in a genre especially obsessed with statements of dominance, Eminem doesn't disguise his feelings of irrelevance. He does, however, try to claim his influence." He added that the album shows that "Eminem is great at what he does." For Uproxx, Aaron Williams also praised the rapper's technical abilities and also pointed out the function of engage with his critics that this music performs.

In a more critical review, Stephen Kearse of Rolling Stone gave the album 2.5 out of five stars, situating Eminem in contemporary hip-hop by writing, "Eminem has no insights or ideas about the state of rap, nor does he have meaningful thoughts about his place within the genre. He probably doesn’t even have a Spotify account. He raps only for the sheer thrill of hearing himself rap." The Hollywood Reporter's Jonny Coleman considered the album an "epic fail" and described it as "the work of an aging artist trying, and failing, to remain relevant by acting out." In Billboard, Charles Holmes said Eminem "tries to stop [his] artistic decline by blaming everyone except himself," and concluded, "Eminem was once a titan of hip-hop, but he never owned it [...] The world and rap might not need Eminem or Slim Shady anymore, but it could do with a little more Marshall." In The New Zealand Herald, Siena Yates praised Eminem for "technically flawless flows and cheeky wordplay" as well as "a thrilling command of cadence" but gave the album three out of five stars because, "He's just not saying much and what he is saying smacks of ignorance and someone reaching for relevance in a world he's hellbent on rejecting. It's not fun, informative, challenging or entertaining, it's just a lot of technical skill and angry fist-shaking." The Guardian's Alexis Petridis gave the album three out of five stars and commented on Eminem's generational difference with current hip-hop stars, summing up, "...if you're going to listen to a middle-aged white man complain that hip-hop isn't as good as it used to be, that [sic] it might as well be Eminem."

Exclaim!'s Riley Wallace cited the anger of Eminem's early work, unnecessary homophobia, and the shortcomings of Revival in a middling review of 6/10: "Angry, reactionary Em is nothing new. Though his skill is absolutely unmatched, homophobic references and overly misogynistic bars in 2018 do feel excessively out of touch. It's not his best or his worst—but, it's definitely what fans deserved eight months ago." For Pitchfork, Marc Hogan gave the album five out of 10, writing, "[Eminem's] career has become an exhausting feedback loop, and Kamikaze flies straight into that downward spiral", criticizing it as "yet another empty, intermittently tone-deaf onslaught of technical rap prowess and humorless juvenilia from an artist who once controlled the zeitgeist with ease" but praising his technical skills as a rapper and clever lyricist. In NME, Dan Stubbs gave the album three out of five stars, saying that Eminem is out of step with trends in hip-hop by writing, "there's a sense Eminem struggles with the modern world" but stating that "there are plenty of moments... that remind us of Em's greatness". Stephen Thomas Erlewine of AllMusic also emphasized Eminem's technical ability and lack of inspiration: "As sheer performance, Eminem's vocals remain a thing of wonder, which is why it's so dispiriting to hear him circling the drain, relying on old tricks instead of expanding his worldview. He has the musical skills to mature; he's just refusing to let himself act his age." In Spin, Jesse Fairfax criticized the tenor of the album, writing "Eminem's defensiveness seems to preclude whatever reckoning he could otherwise have with any creative shortcomings that may have led him here". NPR's Rodney Carmichael suggested that the album is a parody writing, "[Eminem] may be going out with a cliché bang on Kamikaze, but he hasn't sounded more like himself in years", summing up his review with the critique, "Kamikaze may not be a success on the surface. But Eminem has inadvertently succeeded at making himself the butt of his biggest joke yet. It's so funny he forgot to laugh."

Retrospectively, in a 2024 ranking of Eminem's 12 studio albums, Damien Scott of Billboard magazine placed Kamikaze fifth, highlighting the tracks "Stepping Stone" and "Good Guy", as well as writing: "The lofty heavy themes of the last album [Revival] are gone—instead, the overarching idea here is that Eminem can still rap better than any rapper anywhere. He tapped popular producers like Tay Keith, Boi-1da, and Mike Will Made-It to prove that he could crush their beats, just like the new crop of rappers."

== Commercial performance ==
In the United States, Kamikaze opened at number one on the Billboard 200 with 434,000 album-equivalent units, consisting of 252,000 traditional album sales as well as 225 million streams, giving Eminem his largest amount of streams within a week. This put him in the top ten for highest first week sales of 2018. It became his ninth consecutive number-one album in the country, tying him with Garth Brooks and The Rolling Stones for fifth-most entries to top the chart, and had the year's fifth-highest first-week sales in the USA. He also topped the Artist 100 chart due to album sales and song streams. The album dropped one place to number two in its second week behind Paul McCartney's Egypt Station, earning an additional 136,000 album-equivalent units. All eleven songs entered the Billboard Hot 100, with "Lucky You" and "The Ringer" reaching numbers six and eight on the chart. He is the fifth artist to debut two songs in its top 10 simultaneously. By October 17, it was the best-selling hip-hop album of the year and a few days later, it was certified platinum by the Recording Industry Association of America with 1 million album-equivalent units in the United States; 415,000 of them being pure sales.

The album also entered atop the UK Albums Chart on September 7, with first week sales of 55,000 album equivalent units, including 30,000 album-equivalent streams, making Kamikaze the United Kingdom's fifth-most streamed album in an opening week. As a result, Eminem surpassed Led Zeppelin and ABBA for the most consecutive albums to reach the nation's summit, with nine. It was also the top album in Scotland. The following week, the album retained the top spot, with 51% of its consumption coming from streams and garnered 29,000 units for the third week to stay at number one. It managed to stay atop the charts for four weeks. It was the 10th best-selling album of 2018 in the United Kingdom.

It additionally debuted at the top of the ARIA Albums Chart, giving Eminem his ninth number-one album in Australia (where it stayed for four weeks) and the Canadian Albums Chart, becoming Eminem's 10th number-one album in Canada after debuting with 44,000 album-equivalent units. Other international charts that it topped include Austria, Belgium (Flanders only; it reached third in Wallonia), the Czech Republic, Denmark, Finland, Ireland, Italy, the Netherlands, New Zealand, Norway, Sweden, and Switzerland; it retained top spot in Ireland the following two weeks. Kamikaze debuted at sixth in France, fourth in Germany, tenth in Greece, eighth in Hungary, third in Poland, and fifteenth in Spain; after one week, it rose to second in Germany, and twelfth in Spain.

On streaming music service Spotify, five tracks from Kamikaze were in the top 10 of the week of September 4, including the top two spots. At the iTunes Store, three songs were in the top ten and Kamikaze topped the album charts in the first week of release. The album had the fifth-strongest opening week for streaming in the United Kingdom with 30,000 equivalent units. "Lucky You" represents the first time that Eminem has topped the Streaming Songs Chart from Billboard.

In 2018, Kamikaze was ranked as the 17th most popular album of the year on the Billboard 200 and by the end of the year Kamikaze had sold over 1,014,000 album-equivalent units in the US, with over 457,000 being pure sales. As of January 2019, Kamikaze has sold over 500,000 copies in pure sales, making it the only solo album of 2018 to do so. According to the International Federation of the Phonographic Industry, Kamikaze was the ninth best-selling album globally of 2018, with 1 million physical and digital copies sold.

== Controversy ==
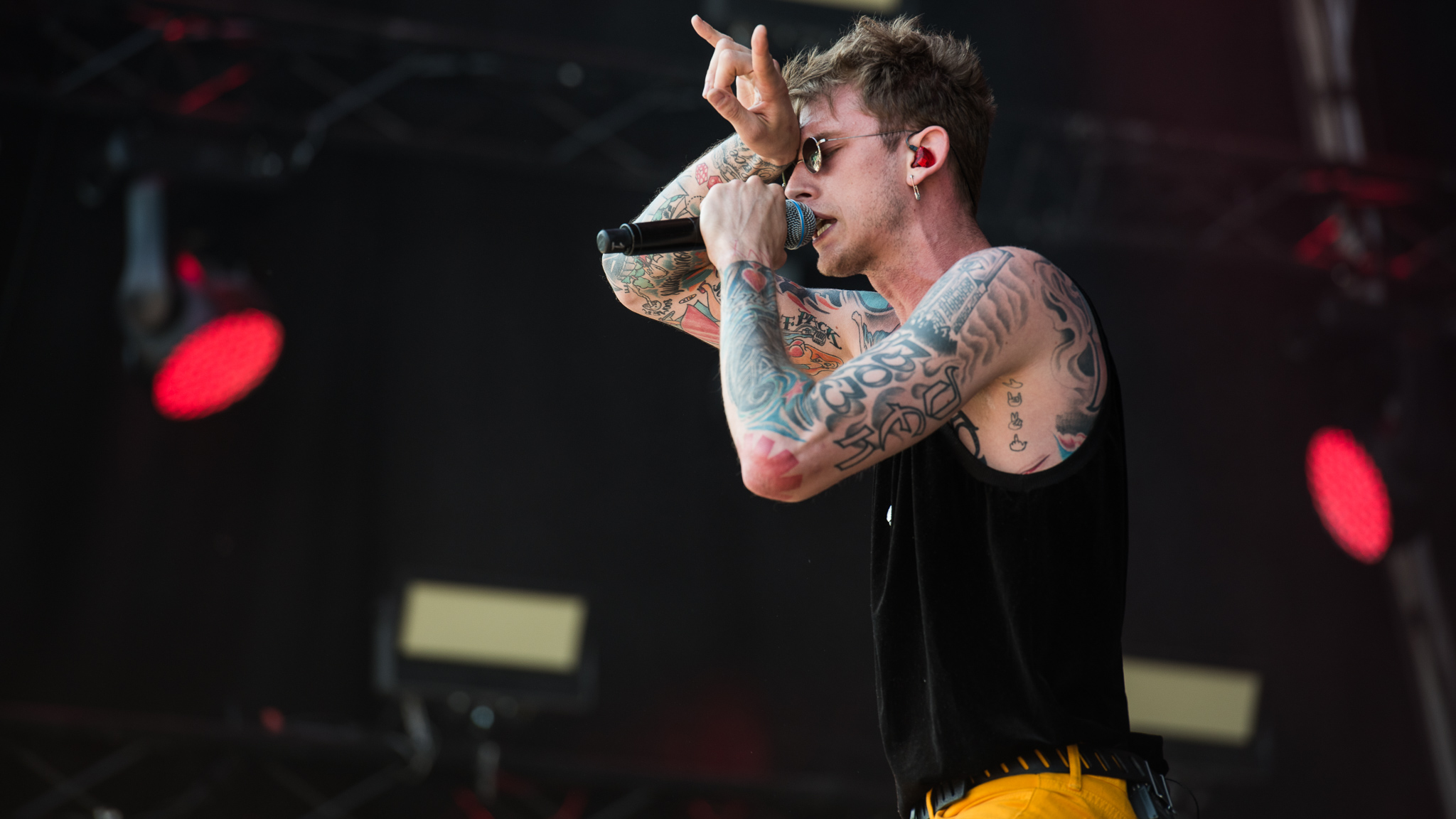
Eminem's diss of fellow Midwestern rapper Machine Gun Kelly resulted in the response song "Rap Devil".

Throughout the album, lyrics criticize other musicians and several have responded publicly. Eminem and rapper Machine Gun Kelly have had an ongoing feud for several years, and Kelly released a diss track in response to "Not Alike" titled "Rap Devil" on September 3; both songs were produced by Ronny J. Kelly continued the feud at a concert, calling it "a battle between the past and the fucking future". The song's title refers to Eminem's "Rap God" and Eminem went into the studio days later to record his own response, as did former D12 associate Bizarre. Eminem responded with "Killshot" on September 14 and Bizarre's "Love Tap" was released on September 20. "Killshot" garnered 38.1 million streams on YouTube in its first 24 hours and over 80 million views in its first week, making it the most successful debut for a hip-hop song (at the time) and the third-biggest debut in the platform's history. The track also debuted at number 3 on the Billboard Hot 100, making it Eminem's 20th top 10 hit on the Billboard Hot 100. Kelly has continued the feud publicly.

Ja Rule responded on social media, re-igniting a feud the two had 15 years prior. 6ix9ine, Iggy Azalea, Joe Budden, Die Antwoord, Lupe Fiasco, and Lord Jamar also made public statements, with the first releasing the skit "Legend" that raps over Eminem's "Lose Yourself". Artists including 50 Cent and Remy Ma have come out in support of Eminem.

Critics have objected to Eminem's use of the slur "faggot" to describe rapper Tyler, the Creator on the song "Fall", such as Mikelle Street of Billboard, who wrote, "Eminem needs to be held accountable for using homophobic slurs (again)," further adding, "the idea that listeners are too 'soft' for critiquing the ways in which rappers weaponize the identities of others against them ignores how hip-hop is a reflection and arbiter of culture." Matt Miller of Esquire relates his use of the term to previous homophobic lyrics and calls it the "biggest problem" of the album. The BBC's Jimmy Blake summed up the first week of objections to Eminem's language and questioned if it is time for him to retire. Dan Reynolds of Imagine Dragons called the rapper's language "hateful" and Troye Sivan also spoke out against the slur. Additionally, guest vocalist Justin Vernon distanced himself from the collaboration due to the message. Eminem later apologized in his "Kamikaze interview" with Sway Calloway posted to his website: "In my quest to hurt him, I realize I was hurting a lot of other people".

In response to allegations that "Not Alike" sounds similar to Bhad Bhabie's "Hi Bich", Bhabie has responded that she takes the comparison as a compliment. She revised the lyrics of 15 to pay respect to Eminem.

== Track listing ==
Kamikaze track listing
No.	Title	Writer(s)	Producer(s)	Length
1.	"The Ringer"	Ray Fraser; Matthew Jacobson; Katorah Marrero; Marshall Mathers; Luis Resto; Ronald Spence, Jr.	Illa da Producer (Part 1); Ronny J (Part 2); Eminem^{[a]}	5:37
2.	"Greatest"	Jordan Carter; Kendrick Duckworth; Asheton Hogan; Jordan Jenks; Mathers; Jeremy Miller; Anthony Tiffith; Michael Williams II; Symere Woods	Mike Will Made It; Jeremy Miller	3:46
3.	"Lucky You" (featuring Joyner Lucas)	Ray Fraser; Gary Lucas; Mathers; Matthew Samuels; Jahaan Sweet	Boi-1da; Jahaan Sweet (Part 1); Illa da Producer (Part 2); Eminem^{[a]}	4:04
4.	"Paul" (skit performed by Paul Rosenberg)	Paul Rosenberg	Eminem	0:35
5.	"Normal"	Erik Bodin; Fraser; Larry Griffin, Jr.; Mathers; Yukimi Nagano; Maurice Nichols; R. Sheldon; Fredrik Wallin; Håkan Wirenstrand	Illa da Producer (Part 1); LoneStarrMuzik; S1 (Part 2); Swish Allnet^{[a]}	3:42
6.	"Em Calls Paul" (skit)	Mathers	Eminem	0:49
7.	"Stepping Stone"	Mathers; Luis Resto; Mario Resto	Eminem; Luis Resto^{[a]}	5:09
8.	"Not Alike" (featuring Royce da 5'9")	Brytavious Chambers; Mathers; Ryan Montgomery; Spence, Jr.	Tay Keith (Part 1); Ronny J (Part 2); Eminem^{[a]}	4:48
9.	"Kamikaze"	Bobby Ervin; Mathers; Dwayne Simon; James Smith; Timothy Suby	Suby; Eminem^{[a]}	3:36
10.	"Fall"	BJ Burton; Mathers; L. Resto; Justin Vernon; Williams	Mike Will Made-iT; Eminem^{[a]}	4:22
11.	"Nice Guy" (with Jessie Reyez)	Fred Ball; L. Griffin, Jr.; Mathers; L. Resto; Jessica Reyez	Ball; S1; Eminem^{[a]}	2:30
12.	"Good Guy" (featuring Jessie Reyez)	Norio Aono; Fraser; Lisa Gomamoto; Mathers; Reyez; Yutaka Yamada	Illa da Producer; Eminem^{[a]}	2:22
13.	"Venom" (Music from the Motion Picture)	Mathers; Luis Resto	Eminem; Luis Resto^{[a]}	4:29
Total length:				45:49

Notes

- ^{^[a]} signifies an additional producer.

Sample credits

- "The Ringer" contains an interpolation from "Ooouuu", written by Matthew Jacobson and Young M.A, as performed by the latter.
- "Greatest" contains an interpolation from "Humble" as performed by Kendrick Lamar and "wokeuplikethis*" as performed by Playboi Carti. ft. Lil Uzi Vert.
- "Normal" contains a sample from "Seconds", written and performed by Little Dragon.
- "Kamikaze" contains a sample from "I'm Bad", written by Bobby Ervin, Dwayne Simon, and LL Cool J, as performed by the latter.
- "Good Guy" contains a sample from an AmaLee cover of "Glassy Sky" from the anime series Tokyo Ghoul, originally sung by Donna Burke.

== Personnel ==
- Eminem – lead vocals, production, mixing

Musicians

- Scram Jones – scratching on "Kamikaze"
- Joyner Lucas – vocals on "Lucky You"
- Luis Resto – keyboards on "The Ringer", "Not Alike", and "Kamikaze"; production on "Stepping Stone" and "Venom"
- Mario Resto – vocals on "Stepping Stone"
- Jessie Reyez – vocals on "Nice Guy" and "Good Guy"
- Paul Rosenberg – discussion on "Paul"
- Royce da 5'9" – vocals on "Not Alike"
- Justin Vernon – vocals on "Fall"

Technical personnel

- Swish Allnet – production on "Normal"
- Fred Ball – production on "Nice Guy"
- Boi-1da – production on "Lucky You"
- Tony Campagna – recording on all songs
- Dr. Dre – executive production
- Brian "Big Bass" Gardner – mastering
- Illa da Producer – production on "The Ringer", "Lucky You", "Normal", and "Good Guy"
- Brian Jones – recording on “Not Alike”
- Tay Keith – production on "Not Alike"
- LoneStarrMuzik – production on "Normal"
- Mike Will Made It – production on "Greatest" and "Fall"
- Jeremy Miller – production on "Greatest"
- Ronny J – production on "The Ringer" and "Not Alike"
- S1 – production on "Normal" and "Nice Guy"
- Mike Saputo – art design, art direction, and illustration
- Joe Strange – recording on all songs
- Mike Strange – recording on all songs, mixing
- Tim Suby – production on "Kamikaze"
- Jahaan Sweet – production on "Lucky You"

== Charts ==
=== Weekly charts ===
Chart performance for Kamikaze
Chart (2018)	Peak position
Australian Albums (ARIA)	1
Austrian Albums (Ö3 Austria)	1
Belgian Albums (Ultratop Flanders)	1
Belgian Albums (Ultratop Wallonia)	3
Canadian Albums (Billboard)	1
Czech Albums (ČNS IFPI)	1
Danish Albums (Hitlisten)	1
Dutch Albums (Album Top 100)	1
Estonia (Eesti Ekspress)	1
Finnish Albums (Suomen virallinen lista)	1
French Albums (SNEP)	3
German Albums (Offizielle Top 100)	2
German Albums (Top 20 Hip Hop)	1
Greek Albums (IFPI)	1
Hungarian Albums (MAHASZ)	8
Irish Albums (IRMA)	1
Italian Albums (FIMI)	1
Japan Hot Albums (Billboard Japan)	24
Japanese Albums (Oricon)	32
Lithuanian Albums (AGATA)	1
New Zealand Albums (RMNZ)	1
Norwegian Albums (VG-lista)	1
Polish Albums (ZPAV)	3
Portuguese Albums (AFP)	4
Scottish Albums (Official Charts)	1
Slovak Albums (ČNS IFPI)	1
Spanish Albums (Promusicae)	12
Swedish Albums (Sverigetopplistan)	1
Swiss Albums (Schweizer Hitparade)	1
UK Albums (Official Charts)	1
US Billboard 200	1
US Top R&B/Hip-Hop Albums (Billboard)	1

=== Year-end charts ===
2018 annual chart performance for Kamikaze
Chart (2018)	Position
Australian Albums (ARIA)	6
Austrian Albums (Ö3 Austria)	25
Belgian Albums (Ultratop Flanders)	21
Belgian Albums (Ultratop Wallonia)	82
Canadian Albums (Billboard)	10
Danish Albums (Hitlisten)	25
Dutch Albums (Album Top 100)	14
Estonian Albums (Eesti Ekspress)	12
French Albums (SNEP)	92
German Albums (Offizielle Top 100)	34
Hungarian Albums (MAHASZ)	89
Icelandic Albums (Plötutíóindi)	41
Irish Albums (IRMA)	19
Italian Albums (FIMI)	65
New Zealand Albums (RMNZ)	9
Portuguese Albums (AFP)	108
Swedish Albums (Sverigetopplistan)	19
Swiss Albums (Schweizer Hitparade)	9
UK Albums (OCC)	10
US Billboard 200	17
US Top R&B/Hip-Hop Albums (Billboard)	13

2019 annual chart performance for Kamikaze
Chart (2019)	Position
Australian Albums (ARIA)	23
Belgian Albums (Ultratop Flanders)	62
Belgian Albums (Ultratop Wallonia)	169
Canadian Albums (Billboard)	25
Danish Albums (Hitlisten)	72
Icelandic Albums (Plötutíóindi)	97
New Zealand Albums (RMNZ)	20
Swedish Albums (Sverigetopplistan)	67
Swiss Albums (Schweizer Hitparade)	90
UK Albums (OCC)	67
US Billboard 200	52
US Top R&B/Hip-Hop Albums (Billboard)	39

=== Decade-end charts ===
Decade-end chart performance for Kamikaze
Chart (2010–2019)	Position
US Billboard 200	184

== Certifications and sales ==
Certifications for Kamikaze
Region	Certification	Certified units/sales
Australia (ARIA)	Platinum	70,000^{‡}
Austria (IFPI Austria)	Platinum	15,000^{‡}
Denmark (IFPI Danmark)	Platinum	20,000^{‡}
France (SNEP)	Platinum	100,000^{‡}
Germany (BVMI)	Gold	100,000^{‡}
Italy (FIMI)	Gold	25,000^{‡}
New Zealand (RMNZ)	2× Platinum	30,000^{‡}
Norway (IFPI Norway)	Gold	10,000^{‡}
Poland (ZPAV)	Platinum	20,000^{‡}
Singapore (RIAS)	Gold	5,000^{*}
United Kingdom (BPI)	Platinum	300,000^{‡}
United States (RIAA)	Platinum	1,000,000^{‡}
^{*} Sales figures based on certification alone.^{‡} Sales+streaming figures based on certification alone.

== Release history ==
Album formats and release dates
Region	Date	Format	Label
Worldwide	August 31, 2018	Digital download; streaming	Shady; Aftermath; Interscope
Worldwide	September 7, 2018	CD	Shady; Aftermath; Interscope
Worldwide	November 30, 2018	cassette; LP	Shady; Aftermath; Interscope

== See also ==
- 2018 in hip-hop
- List of 2018 albums
