= Live from New York City =

2005 Eminem's concert film directed by Hamish Hamilton

Live From New York City

Video concert film by Eminem
- Released: December 3, 2005
- Recorded: August 8–9, 2005
- Venue: Madison Square Garden, New York City
- Genre: Hip hop
- Length: approx. 78:00
- Label: Eagle Vision
- Director: Hamish Hamilton
- Producer: Jock McLean; Richie Namm

Eminem chronology
Eminem Presents the Anger Management Tour (2005)	Live From New York City (2005)

Music video
- "Eminem: Live from New York City" on YouTube

Professional ratings
Review scores
Source	Rating
PopMatters	3/10 stars
RapReviews	9.5/10

Live from New York City is a concert film directed by Hamish Hamilton, documenting American rapper Eminem's live concert at the Madison Square Garden in New York City on August 8 and 9 as part of his third Anger Management Tour. The taped event, also featuring a supporting cast of D12, Obie Trice, Stat Quo and Alchemist, was originally premiered on Showtime on December 3, 2005. It was released on DVD on November 13, 2007 and on Blu-ray on October 19, 2009 via Eagle Rock Entertainment.

The third edition of Anger Management Tour concerts, including Live from New York City, were in support of Eminem's fifth solo studio album Encore. This video marks Eminem's fourth and to-date final concert film, as well as the last performance to feature Proof before his death in 2006.

== Track listing ==
No.	Title	Length
1.	"Backstage 1"
2.	"Evil Deeds"
3.	"Mosh"
4.	"Business"
5.	"Rain Man"
6.	"Ass Like That"
7.	"Puke"
8.	"Kill You"
9.	"Like Toy Soldiers"
10.	"Git Up" (featuring D12)
11.	"How Come" (featuring D12)
12.	"Rockstar" (featuring Bizarre)
13.	"40 Oz." (featuring D12)
14.	"My Band" (featuring D12)
15.	"Backstage 2"
16.	"Stan"
17.	"The Way I Am"
18.	"Just Don't Give a Fuck"
19.	"Got Some Teeth" (featuring Obie Trice)
20.	"Stay 'Bout It (Aqua)" (featuring Stat Quo)
21.	"The Set Up" (featuring Stat Quo)
22.	"Like Dat" (featuring Obie Trice and Stat Quo)
23.	"Cleanin' Out My Closet"
24.	"Mockingbird"
25.	"Just Lose It"
26.	"Backstage 3"
27.	"Lose Yourself" (featuring D12)

== Cast ==
- Marshall Mathers – main performer, executive producer
- DeShaun Holton – hypeman, featured performer
- Denaun Porter – featured performer
- Rufus Johnson – featured performer
- Von Carlisle – featured performer
- Ondre Moore – featured performer
- Obie Trice – featured performer
- Stanley Benton – featured performer
- Alan Maman – DJ

== Personnel ==
- Hamish Hamilton – director
- Hayley Collett – associate director
- Paul Rosenberg – executive producer, management
- Stuart Parr – executive producer
- Richie Namm – producer
- Mace Camhe – producer
- Luca Scalisi – co-producer
- Marc Labelle – associate producer, management
- Neil Maman – management

== Charts ==
Chart (2007)	Peak position
US Music Video Sales (Billboard)	13

== Release history ==
Country	Date	Label	Format
Worldwide	December 3, 2005	Showtime (TV network)	Television special
Worldwide	November 13, 2007	Eagle Rock Entertainment	DVD
Worldwide	October 19, 2009	Eagle Rock Entertainment	Blu-ray
