= Herstory in the Making =

Studio album by Young M.A
- Released: September 27, 2019
- Genre: Hip hop
- Length: 67:31
- Label: M.A Music; 3D
- Producer: Amadeus; Bruce Leroy; Buda & Grandz; DiMuro; Dr. O; Hagler; Jordan Lewis; Kofi Black; Mike Zombie; NY Bangers; OZ; Syk Sense; Tone Bird; Zaytoven

Singles from Herstory in the Making
- 1. "PettyWap" Released: July 3, 2018; 2. "Car Confessions" Released: August 10, 2018; 3. "Bleed" Released: November 30, 2018; 4. "Stubborn Ass" Released: February 14, 2019; 5. "Big" Released: June 28, 2019; 6. "PettyWap 2" Released: August 30, 2019; 7. "No Mercy" Released: September 23, 2019

Herstory in the Making is the debut studio album by American rapper Young M.A. It was released on September 27, 2019, by M.A Music and 3D. The album features guest appearances from Max YB and Relle Bey and features production from Zaytoven, Mike Zombie, Amadeus, and NY Bangers, among others. It was supported by seven singles: "PettyWap", "Car Confessions", "Bleed", "Stubborn Ass", "Big", "PettyWap 2", and "No Mercy".

== Writing and recording ==
The album is dedicated to M.A's late brother Kenneth Ramos, who was murdered on September 26, 2009. In a press release, Young M.A stated:

There isn't a single day that I don't think about my brother. He continues to motivate me; inspire me and this project will forever be dedicated to his legacy. You're gonna get the truth. You're gonna get the cocky joints, the slick talk joints where I talk my talk, but then I'm gonna get personal. Real personal. That's why this called Herstory In The Making because it's about all sides of me. People will hear this album and say, 'I had no idea she was going through all that.' I don't put myself out there on social media. I save it for the music, and I write it all. This is all me.

The album was recorded with guest appearances from Max YB and Relle Bey and production from Zaytoven, Mike Zombie, Amadeus, and NY Bangers, among others. It follows Young M.A.'s Herstory EP, released in 2017.

== Marketing and sales ==
On August 29, 2019, Young M.A revealed the album's title, cover art, track listing and release date via her social media accounts. The album was released on September 27 by M.A Music and 3D. It peaked at number 16 on the Billboard 200 albums chart.

== Critical reception ==
Professional ratings
Review scores
Source	Rating
And It Don't Stop	A−
The Guardian	4/5 stars
HipHopDX	3.7/5
Pitchfork	7.3/10
Tom Hull – on the Web	B+

Herstory in the Making was met with positive reviews. Pitchfork reviewer Sheldon Pearce hailed it as "another big, long flex from one of the most skilled rappers to emerge in the last five years". In his "Consumer Guide" column, Robert Christgau said, "It's a woman's voice with a brawny, low-pitched masculinity to it, articulated with no show of care and every well-chosen word distinct. The hook-free beats are as utilitarian and accomplished as vocals that always take the rhymes where they want to go".

== Track listing ==
Credits adapted from Tidal and Respect.

No.	Title	Writer(s)	Producer(s)	Length
1.	"No Mercy (Intro)"	Katorah Marrero; Kofi Brifu; Yurii Ludanov	Kofi Black & Southside Gang (WBM)	2:11
2.	"Da Come Up"	Marrero; Gregory Youance	Crown Beatz; Tone Byrd	2:41
3.	"Big"	Marrero; William Coleman; Alain Poinsot	Mike Zombie	3:45
4.	"Kold World"	Marrero; Xavier Dotson	Zaytoven	3:57
5.	"PettyWap"	Marrero; Antwan Thompson; Anthony Barfield; Orrin Wilson	Amadeus; Bruce Leroy; Dr. O	2:56
6.	"The Lyfestyle"	Marrero; Matthew Jacobson	NY Bangers	3:25
7.	"Smoove Kriminal"	Marrero; Antwan Thompson	Amadeus; Bruce Leroy; Dr. O	2:41
8.	"Stubborn Ass"	Marrero; Marvin Thomas; Jordan Lewis	Hagler; Lewis	3:20
9.	"RNID (abbreviated as Rich Nigga ID)"	Marrero; Thompson	Amadeus; Trilogy	3:23
10.	"She Like I'm Like"	Marrero; Thompson; Barfield; Wilson	Amadeus; Bruce Leroy; Dr. O	3:11
11.	"Numb"	Marrero; Thompson	Amadeus; Bruce Leroy; Dr. O	2:51
12.	"Bipolar"	Marrero	OZ; Syk Sense	1:58
13.	"Bleed"	Marrero; Jacobson	NY Bangers	3:30
14.	"No Love"	Marrero; Jacobson	NY Bangers	3:19
15.	"Car Confessions"	Marrero; Thompson; Dan Garcia; Francis Ubiera; Maxwell Ramsey; Shannon Sanders	Amadeus; Buda & Grandz	4:21
16.	"Foreign"	Marrero; Jacobson; Adam Feeney	NY Bangers; Frank Dukes	3:26
17.	"NNAN (abbreviated as Never Need a Nigga)" (featuring Relle Bey and Max YB)	Marrero; Relle Bey; Scott Mejon; Thompson	Amadeus; Bruce Leroy; Dr. O	3:13
18.	"My Hitta"	Marrero; Thompson; Michael DiMuro	Amadeus; DiMuro	3:05
19.	"Sober Thoughts" (featuring Max YB)	Marrero; Mejon; Jacobson; Clayton Knight; Harrison Mills	NY Bangers	4:26
20.	"Crime Poetry (Outro)"	Marrero; Jacobson	NY Bangers	3:16
21.	"PettyWap 2" (bonus)	Marrero; Jacobson; Jake Dutton	NY Bangers	2:36
Total length:				67:31

== Charts ==
Chart (2019)	Peak position
Canadian Albums (Billboard)	60
US Billboard 200	16
