= Ooouuu =

Single by Young M.A

from the album Her-story
- Released: May 12, 2016
- Recorded: 2016
- Genre: Hip hop
- Length: 3:54
- Label: M.A Music
- Songwriters: Katorah Marrero; Matthew Norrish Jacobson
- Producer: U-Dub of NY Bangers

Young M.A singles chronology
"Body Bag" (2015)	"Ooouuu" (2016)	"EAT" (2016)

Music video
- "Ooouuu" on YouTube

"Ooouuu" (stylized in all caps) is a song by American rapper Young M.A. The song was produced by U-Dub (of NY Bangers). It was released as a single on May 12, 2016.

== Background ==
In an interview with Genius, Young M.A spoke on the creation process behind the song:

When I first heard the beat and wrote to it, I said to myself, "This is one of those records where I just wanna relax." There's not too much thinking about the bars or the punchlines, I needed a feel good record. I didn’t have one of those yet, I was putting so much work into my pen. This is a record where I just wanted to be cool on the track. I'm chill, I'm humble a lot, I needed one of those records.

When I went to record the track, I wanted to be drunk while I recorded it. I was really smizz and drizz when I recorded the record so it feels authentic. When I recorded the track I wasn't going to put it out just yet because I had just released Sleep Walkin and I had a lot of records on there I wanted to do videos for. But something one day just told me that I needed to put this out—nobody told me, just one day I thought this would take me to the next level.

I didn't want some big push behind it, I was just like this is a record I just wanna put out. From there, I guess it was catchy and it was different from me.

== Critical reception ==
"Ooouuu" was placed at number 11 on Rolling Stone’s "50 Best Songs of 2016" list. Billboard ranked "Ooouuu" at number 16 on their "100 Best Pop Songs of 2016" list. Pitchfork listed "Ooouuu" on their ranking of the 100 best songs of 2016 at number 67. In the annual Village Voice's Pazz & Jop mass critics poll of the year's best in music in 2016, "Ooouuu" was ranked at number 24.

== In other media ==
- The song was sampled by Eminem for the opening track "The Ringer" on Kamikaze.
- A character extensively pantomimes the song at a sleepover during the "HBD" episode of High Maintenance

== Music video ==
On May 12, 2016, Young M.A released the music video for "Ooouuu" on her YouTube account, the same day as the release to the song. Since the video was posted, the video surpassed over 400 million views.

== Remixes ==
The official remix to "Ooouuu", released on September 30, 2016, features a new opening verse by fellow New York City rapper 50 Cent. In addition, "Ooouuu" was unofficially remixed several times by various American rappers, such as Remy Ma, French Montana, ASAP Ferg, Jadakiss, Meek Mill, Beanie Sigel, Nicki Minaj, and The Game, among others.

== Charts and certifications ==
=== Weekly charts ===
Chart (2016–17)	Peak position
Canada Hot 100 (Billboard)	41
US Billboard Hot 100	19
US Hot R&B/Hip-Hop Songs (Billboard)	5

=== Year-end charts ===
Chart (2016)	Position
US Hot R&B/Hip-Hop Songs (Billboard)	53
Chart (2017)	Position
US Hot R&B/Hip-Hop Songs (Billboard)	65

=== Certifications ===
Region	Certification	Certified units/sales
United Kingdom (BPI)	Silver	200,000^{‡}
United States (RIAA)	4× Platinum	4,000,000^{‡}
^{‡} Sales+streaming figures based on certification alone.
