= Self Esteem (song) =

1994 single by the Offspring

Single by the Offspring

from the album Smash
- B-side: "Burn It Up"; "Jennifer Lost the War"
- Released: December 22, 1994
- Genre: Punk rock; pop-punk; grunge; alternative rock
- Length: 4:17
- Label: Epitaph
- Songwriter: Dexter Holland
- Producer: Thom Wilson

The Offspring singles chronology
"Come Out and Play (Keep 'Em Separated)" (1994)	"Self Esteem" (1994)	"Gotta Get Away" (1995)

"Self Esteem" is a song by American punk rock band the Offspring. It is the eighth track and second single from their third studio album, Smash (1994). The single was released in 1995 by Epitaph and was a worldwide hit, reaching number one in Iceland, Norway, Latvia and Sweden. "Self Esteem" was nominated for the 1995 MTV Europe Music Awards for Best Song. The song also appears as the third track on their 2005 compilation album Greatest Hits. Its music video was directed by Darren Lavett.

== Critical reception ==
In his review of the album, Andrew Mueller from Melody Maker wrote, "The clear highlight here is "Self Esteem", a self-abasing, self-pitying slandering of some or other black-hearted wench set to a rocket as inventive as they get." Pan-European magazine Music & Media commented, "Coming out once more to play the role of Nirvana's perfect replacement, Offspring delivers the punky action so sadly missed on rock radio because of Seattlers who take themselves way too seriously." John Harris from NME, taking a negative view, said, "The male-only dorms of US colleges have surely been throbbing to this for months. Small wonder: "Self-esteem" — to which the phrase "Crap Teen Spirit" barely does justice — is built around a premise that roots it firmly in the odorous world of the knucklehead male adolescent."

In 2012, Loudwire ranked the song number four on their list of the 10 greatest Offspring songs, and in 2021, Kerrang! ranked the song number two on their list of the 20 greatest Offspring songs.

== Music video ==
The music video for "Self Esteem" was directed by Darren Lavett (who directed the previous video, "Come Out and Play") and was shot in August 1994 after the Offspring had just gone both gold and platinum with Smash. In the music video, several people are doing stunts, intercut with shots of the band playing on stage.

In the video, Dexter Holland wears three different band T-shirts. Initially, he wears a Sex Pistols T-shirt. Later he dons a T-shirt of the Germs, and then a Vandals T-shirt when he briefly appears as a human skeleton.

In an interview on the Offspring's Greatest Hits DVD, Noodles claimed that he gave his Fender Stratocaster (which he played in the videos for "Come Out and Play" and "Self Esteem") to one of the actors who appeared in the video.

"Self Esteem" remains one of the Offspring's popular videos. Its popularity on MTV helped launch the song to success on mainstream radio. According to Nielsen Music's year-end report for 2019, "Self Esteem" was the sixth most-played song of the decade on mainstream rock radio with 131,000 spins. All of the top 10 songs were from the 1990s.

=== DVD appearances ===
The music video also appears on the Complete Music Video Collection DVD. It was released in 2005.

== Track listings ==
CD single, 7-inch blue and 12-inch black vinyl

No.	Title	Length
1.	"Self Esteem"	4:17
2.	"Burn It Up"	2:43
3.	"Jennifer Lost the War"	2:35

CD maxi

No.	Title	Length
1.	"Self Esteem"	4:17
2.	"Jennifer Lost the War"	2:35
3.	"Burn It Up"	2:43

== Personnel ==
=== The Offspring ===
- Dexter Holland – vocals, guitar
- Noodles – guitar, backing vocals
- Greg K. – bass
- Ron Welty – drums

== Charts ==
=== Weekly charts ===
Chart (1994–1995)	Peak position
Australia (ARIA)	6
Australia Alternative (ARIA)	2
Austria (Ö3 Austria Top 40)	4
Belgium (Ultratop 50 Flanders)	7
Belgium (Ultratop 50 Wallonia)	8
Canada Top Singles (RPM)	34
Denmark (Hitlisten)	2
Eurochart Hot 100 (Music & Media)	10
European Alternative Rock Radio (Music & Media)	10
Finland (Suomen virallinen lista)	3
France (SNEP)	20
Germany (GfK)	4
Iceland (Íslenski Listinn Topp 40)	1
Ireland (IRMA)	27
Israel (IBA)	37
Latvia (LAIPA)	1
Netherlands (Dutch Top 40)	4
Netherlands (Single Top 100)	4
New Zealand (Recorded Music NZ)	39
Norway (VG-lista)	1
Scottish Singles Sales (Official Charts)	39
Sweden (Sverigetopplistan)	1
UK Singles (Official Charts)	37
UK Rock & Metal (Official Charts)	3
US Radio Songs (Billboard)	45
US Alternative Airplay (Billboard)	4
US Mainstream Rock (Billboard)	7

=== Year-end charts ===
Chart (1994)	Position
US Modern Rock Tracks (Billboard)	11

Chart (1995)	Position
Australia (ARIA)	35
Austria (Ö3 Austria Top 40)	18
Belgium (Ultratop 50 Flanders)	16
Belgium (Ultratop 50 Wallonia)	20
Eurochart Hot 100 (Music & Media)	30
France (SNEP)	70
Germany (Media Control)	18
Iceland (Íslenski Listinn Topp 40)	7
Latvia (LAIPA)	8
Netherlands (Dutch Top 40)	15
Netherlands (Single Top 100)	19
Norway Winter Period (VG-lista)	12
Sweden (Topplistan)	5

=== Decade-end charts ===
Chart (2010–2019)	Position
US Mainstream Rock (Nielsen Music)	6

== Certifications ==
Region	Certification	Certified units/sales
Australia (ARIA)	Gold	35,000^{^}
Denmark (IFPI Danmark)	Gold	45,000^{‡}
Italy (FIMI)	Gold	50,000^{‡}
New Zealand (RMNZ)	2× Platinum	60,000^{‡}
Norway (IFPI Norway)	Platinum	
Spain (Promusicae)	Gold	30,000^{‡}
Sweden (GLF)	Gold	25,000^{^}
United Kingdom (BPI)	Gold	400,000^{‡}
^{^} Shipments figures based on certification alone.^{‡} Sales+streaming figures based on certification alone.

== Release history ==
Region	Date	Format(s)	Label(s)	Ref.
United States	1994	Radio	Epitaph	
Europe	December 22, 1994	CD	Epitaph; Semaphore; PIAS	
United Kingdom	February 13, 1995	7-inch vinyl; 12-inch vinyl; CD; cassette	Epitaph; Golf	

== Other appearances ==
- On July 20, 2018, 311 released a "reggaefied" cover of the song, which 311's lead singer Nick Hexum said is "probably my favorite song of theirs." On the same day, The Offspring released a cover of 311's "Down". Those cover versions coincided with the beginning of their 2018 Never Ending Summer co-tour.
- The song was covered by Steve 'n' Seagulls in 2016.
- The song was released as downloadable content for the video game Rock Band, in an Offspring pack which was released on October 7, 2008, along with "Gone Away" and "Pretty Fly (For a White Guy)". It also appears in SingStar Rocks!, Guitar Hero: Warriors of Rock and The Darkness II.
