= Young M.A =

American rapper

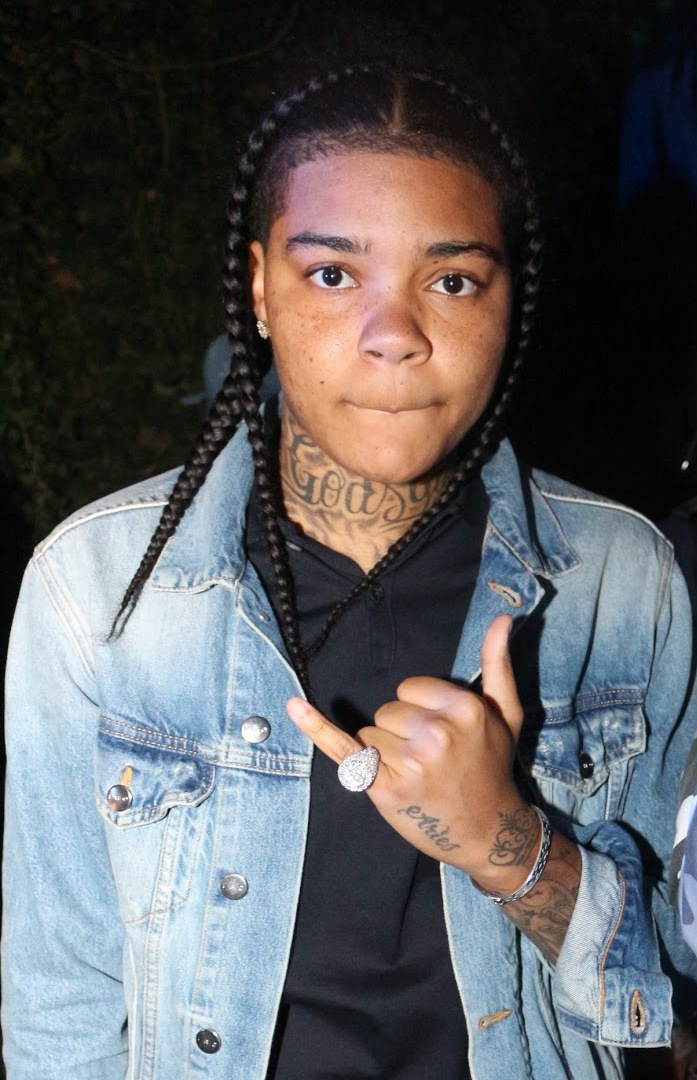
- Young M.A in 2018

Background information
- Born: Katorah Kasanova Marrero; April 3, 1992 (age 34); New York City, U.S.
- Genre: East Coast hip-hop
- Occupations: Rapper; songwriter
- Years active: 2011–present
- Labels: M.A Music; 3D; Ingrooves
- Website: youngmamusic.com
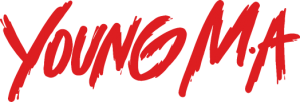

Katorah Kasanova Marrero (born April 3, 1992), better known by her stage name Young M.A (acronym for Young Me. Always), is an American rapper. She is best known for her 2016 single "Ooouuu", which peaked at number 16 on the Billboard Hot 100 and received quadruple platinum certification by the Recording Industry Association of America (RIAA). Its accompanying music video also became a viral hit, receiving over 400 million views on YouTube by 2019. Marrero's debut studio album, Herstory in the Making (2019), peaked at number 16 on the Billboard 200 and was met with positive critical reception.

Following the song's success, Marrero was nominated for BET's Artist of the Year and MTV's Female Hip-Hop Artist of the Year awards. She has been featured in advertising for Google Pixel 2, Beats By Dre and Pandora. In 2018, she was featured on the annual Forbes 30 Under 30 and launched the non-profit KWEENZ Foundation with her mother.

== Early life and education ==
Katorah Marrero was born on 3 April 1992 in Brooklyn, New York. Her mother is Jamaican, and her father is Puerto Rican. Her father was incarcerated when she was a year old and was not released until she was 11, spending approximately 10 years behind bars. With the absence of her father, Marrero grew close to her brother, Kenneth Ramos, and her mother. When Marrero was 7, her mother decided to relocate to Chesterfield, as it provided better school facilities and her children would remain away from the violence of East New York. In Virginia, she started to play tackle football. When she was 10, Marrero started to write rhymes in her schoolbooks. Her mother encouraged her and purchased a karaoke machine, which she would set up as a makeshift studio in her closet. In 2010, she graduated from Sheepshead Bay High School.

When she was a child, Young M.A exhibited a passion for music. When she began seriously focusing on music as an adult, she self-funded a recording studio with local record producers while working at the Shake Shack and T.J. Maxx. In 2014, she gained notoriety when a Facebook post criticized her song "Brooklyn Chiraq", a freestyle to Nicki Minaj and G Herbo "ChiRaq"; the song then went viral. The post's author, pundit Boyce Watkins, said the song promoted "violent, negative, and genocidal energy", but the controversy expanded Young M.A's name recognition and brought new listeners to her work. In 2015, Young M.A released a new song, "Body Bag", which became a "YouTube hit", said Rolling Stone, along with the release of her mixtape called Sleep Walkin', which MTV described as a "thoughtful debut project".

In 2016, Young M.A released her official debut single, "Ooouuu," which peaked at number 19 on the US Billboard Hot 100 chart. In September 2016, the song had nearly 7 million plays on Spotify and was widely remixed by other rappers and hip-hop artists such as Remy Ma, French Montana, Nicki Minaj, Jadakiss, Uncle Murda, ASAP Ferg, Bryan Mathers and Tink, all of whom released their versions of the song. Stereogum's Tom Breihan said "Ooouuu" was "a brash, intense, hard-as-fuck piece of rider music... the song feels like it marks the arrival of a major rap talent." The Fader said Young M.A has "[established] herself as a quintessential New York MC", and MTV's Doreen St. Félix said, "This summer, the atmosphere belongs to Young M.A and her single 'OOOUUU.'" The song's popularity drew attention from labels, though M.A remains an independent artist.

At the 2016 BET Hip Hop Awards, she performed a freestyle on a cypher and performed "Ooouuu", giving what XXL Magazine described as "show-stopping freestyle... one of the best freestyles of the night". Despite the enthusiasm for her performance, Young M.A expressed disappointment, saying BET cut out a portion of her performance. Remy Ma featured M.A at Hot 97's Summer Jam 2017, where she performed alongside other female rap greats. M.A was quoted as saying "There's been a lot of opportunities, and of course a lot of money, but then there's the downside: you lose a lot of people that were once around you once their true colors start to show".

Freestyles such as "Who Run It" and "I Get The Bag" have gained millions of online streams and views, along with her previous single, "Walk", which has amassed over 20 million listens. M.A's single titled "Praktice" is supposedly a reference to the idea that her previous releases have all led up to the full album. Young M.A's debut studio album Herstory in the Making was released on September 27, 2019, and peaked at number 16 on the Billboard 200. It included the singles "Big" and "PettyWap 2". On May 22, 2020, she released the EP Red Flu, marking her first new project since the release of her debut album. On May 21, 2021, she released her second studio album Off the Yak. Pitchfork rated the album 6.9 out of 10.

=== Other projects ===
In 2016, during an interview with Rolling Stone, Young M.A said Lee Daniels offered her the role of "Betty Bars" on the show Empire. The character and role were made especially for her, but she turned it down, preferring to pursue her career as a rapper on her terms and with her moniker instead of being known first as a fictional character. She references being offered the role in her freestyle "Check," rapping, "Shout out to Fox trying to get me on that Empire / At first I had to turn it down, wasn't up to par / 'Cause it's Young M.A, bitch! Fuck is 'Betty Bars'?"

In 2018, she directed her first pornographic film, which was a lesbian porn film, produced by Pornhub, titled The Gift. In 2019, she also appeared in the fourth and final season of Mr. Robot as Peanuts, an employee of criminal Fernando Vera. In 2020, Young M.A appeared as the first feature on Eminem's surprise-released album Music to Be Murdered By on the song "Unaccommodating".

== Personal life ==
=== Sexuality and coming out ===
Young M.A has been open about her sexual orientation in her music throughout her career. During an interview with The Breakfast Club, she stated that she has been attracted to girls since the first grade. She told Vogue that coming out was an important point in her artistic development, stating "I held in being sexually attracted to women for so long that once I got that out of me, the music became easy." As of 2019, she no longer likes to use any kind of label for herself; when Jason Lee of Hollywood Unlocked asked Young M.A about her orientation, the rapper stated, "No, I'm Young M.A . . . . We don't do no labels. I just wouldn't date a guy. Nah, bro, I don't like that."

In an interview with The Breakfast Club, Young M.A stated that she often felt out of place when she was hiding her sexuality. Her mother would often try to get her to discuss her sexuality, but she would always deny she was a lesbian. She stated that she feared her mother would not accept her if she came out. In the interview, she said, "I used to be scared to tell my moms, though I knew my moms wasn't the type of mother to be like 'Oh, I don't like you' or 'I'm gonna ignore you,' but part of me still was scared." Young M.A also said in a different interview, "I was scared to express it to people who are close to me, That was me not accepting it yet, even though I knew deep down in my heart that I liked women."

When she came out to her family at the age of 18, she saw this as a turning point in her rap career. She also said in an interview with Noisey Raps, "Since I came out officially, that's when all the girls flopped, that's when it was a wrap," she laughed. She also said people "feel her more" because she is more comfortable. To continue, another time she said, "Once I became myself, the music was a wrap. Music is my expression. Music is my release. Music is my therapy. This is where I'm going to speak about my sexuality. I've held it in for so long, now I can express it."

Marrero revealed that growing up in New York City helped her accept herself and sexuality. The rapper stated, "In New York City, it's popular. I used to think to myself, man, there's a lot of gay people out there. And it makes me comfortable, it was like, I can be myself! I used to still try to hide it until it was overwhelming—there were just too [many] girls attracted to me!" However, even though she is open about being a lesbian, she does not want it to define her as an artist.

=== Brother's death ===
On September 26, 2009, Young M.A's brother, Kenneth Ramos, was stabbed to death by his former friend. Young M.A missed school for a month due to depression and mourning, and later underwent therapy to deal with his death.

== KWEENZ Foundation ==
Young M.A is the founder of the KWEENZ Foundation. KWEENZ foundation "helps those residing in her East New York neighborhood overcome the grief and trauma that comes with the loss of a loved one." "It’s for women and for men—Kings and Queens…KWEENZ," she says. "I got my mother involved because she sadly lost her son, my brother, in 2009 and this is something for her to get into and give her a little relief and meet other mothers who have been in that situation so they’re not alone." Regarding the vicissitudes of life, Young M.A said, "No matter how much success you have in this life, you still go through those struggles and still go through that pain."

== Television appearances ==
Young M.A appears regularly at the end of Vice News Tonight (on HBO) episodes critiquing many genres of music.

She has also appeared on the Wendy Williams Show, The Tonight Show Starring Jimmy Fallon, Viceland's The Therapist, Snoop Dogg's GGN, MTV's Ridiculousness, Hip Hop Squares, Martha & Snoop's Potluck Dinner Party, Wild 'n Out, Safeword, Total Request Live and Mr. Robot

On October 28, 2019, Young M.A appeared as a guest on Angela Yee's Lip Service.

== Discography ==
=== Studio albums ===
Title	Details	Peak chart position					Certifications
Title	Details	US	US R&B/HH	US Rap	US Ind.	CAN	Certifications
Herstory in the Making	Released: September 27, 2019; Label: M.A Music, 3D; Format: CD, Digital download, streaming	19	8	7	7	60	RIAA: Gold
Off the Yak	Released: May 21, 2021; Label: M.A Music, 3D; Format: CD, Digital download, streaming	—	—	—	38	—	

=== Mixtapes ===
List of mixtapes, with selected details
Title	Details
M.A The Mixtape	Released: March 15, 2015; Label: Self-released; Format: Digital download
Sleep Walkin'	Released: November 4, 2015; Label: Self-released; Format: Digital download

=== Extended plays ===
List of extended plays, with selected details
Title	Details	Peak chart position	
Title	Details	US	US Ind.
Herstory	Released: April 27, 2017 (US); Label: M.A Music; Format: Digital download	166	30
Red Flu	Released: May 22, 2020; Label: M.A Music; Format: Digital download	—	48

=== Singles ===
==== As lead artist ====
List of singles as a lead artist, with selected chart positions
Title	Year	Peak chart positions				Certifications	Album
Title	Year	US	US R&B/HH	US Rap	CAN	Certifications	Album
"Body Bag"	2015	—	—	—	—		M.A The Mixtape
"Ooouuu"	2016	19	5	3	41	RIAA: 4× Platinum	Herstory
"Hot Sauce"	2016	—	—	—	—		Herstory
"Walk"	2017	—	—	—	—		Non-album singles
"Praktice"	2018	—	—	—	—		Non-album singles
"PettyWap"	2018	—	—	—	—	RIAA: Gold	Herstory in the Making
"Car Confessions"	2018	—	—	—	—		Herstory in the Making
"Wahlinn"	2018	—	—	—	—		Non-album single
"Bleed"	2018	—	—	—	—		Herstory in the Making
"Stubborn Ass"	2019	—	—	—	—		Herstory in the Making
"Big"	2019	— (Note: "Big" did not enter the Billboard Hot 100, but peaked at number 20 on the Bubbling Under Hot 100 Singles chart.)	— (Note: "Big" did not enter the Billboard Hot R&B/Hip-Hop Songs chart, but peaked at number seven on the Bubbling Under R&B/Hip-Hop Singles chart.)	—	—	RIAA: Platinum	Herstory in the Making
"PettyWap 2"	2019	—	—	—	—		Herstory in the Making
"Big Steppa"	2020	—	—	—	—		Off the Yak
"Off the Yak"	2021	—	—	—	—		Off the Yak
"Successful"	2021	—	—	—	—		Off the Yak
"Hello Baby" (featuring Fivio Foreign)	2021	—	—	—	—		Off the Yak
"Tip the Surgeon"	2022	—	—	—	—		Non-album singles
"Aye Day Pay Day"	2022	—	—	—	—		Non-album singles
"Cloverfield" (with The Last Artful, Dodgr)	2022	—	—	—	—		Pick a Side
"Pick a Side" (with Wap5tar)	2022	—	—	—	—		Non-album singles
"Open Scars"	2023	—	—	—	—		Non-album singles
"Watch (Still Kween)"	2024	—	—	—	—		Non-album singles

==== As featured artist ====
Title	Year	Album
"Murder Game" (Statik Selektah featuring Young M.A., Smif-N-Wessun and Buckshot)	2015	Lucky 7
"Hella Bars" (C.A.S.H Montana featuring Young Neez and Young M.A)	2016	Non-album singles
"Thot" (Uncle Murda featuring Young M.A and Dios Moreno)	2016	Non-album singles
"30" (Project Pat featuring Young M.A, Coca Vango and Big Trill)	2016	Non-album singles
"Spend It (Remix)" (Dae Dae featuring Young Thug and Young M.A)	2016	Non-album singles
"F.B.G.M." (T-Pain featuring Young M.A)	2017	Non-album singles
"Pump Fakin" (Pras featuring Young M.A)	2017	Wave Culture
"Move Like a Boss" (Fivio Foreign featuring Young M.A)	2020	B.I.B.L.E.

=== Other charted songs ===
Title	Year	Peak chart positions				Certifications	Album
Title	Year	US	US R&B/HH	AUS	CAN	Certifications	Album
"Unaccommodating" (Eminem featuring Young M.A)	2020	36	20	34	25	ARIA: Gold	Music to Be Murdered By

=== Guest appearances ===
List of non-single guest appearances, with other performing artists, showing year released and album name
Title	Year	Other artist(s)	Album
"Unaccommodating"	2020	Eminem	Music to Be Murdered By
"Mountains"	2022	Coi Leray, Fivio Foreign	Trendsetter

== Awards and nominations ==
Award	Year	Nominee	Category	Result	Ref.
BET Awards	2017	Herself	Best New Artist	Nominated	
BET Awards	2017	Herself	Best Female Hip-hop Artist	Nominated	
MTV Video Music Awards	2017	Herself	Best New Artist	Nominated	
