= Anger Management Tour =

Rap and rock music tour

- Tour by Limp Bizkit, Eminem, Papa Roach, Xzibit, D12, DMX, Godsmack, Sinnistar, Outkast, Ludacris, X-Ecutioners, Bionic Jive, 50 Cent, Cypress Hill, Obie Trice, Lil Jon, G-Unit, Stat Quo, Lil Scrappy, Pitbull
- Location: North America • Europe • Asia
- Associated album: The Marshall Mathers LP, Chocolate Starfish and the Hot Dog Flavored Water, Infest, Restless, Awake, And Then There Was X (+ others)
- Start date: October 19, 2000
- End date: August 12, 2005
- Legs: 7
- No. of shows: 116 (+13 cancelled): 20 in Europe (+12 cancelled); 94 in North America (+1 cancelled); 2 in Asia
Eminem tour chronology
Up in Smoke Tour (2000)	Anger Management Tour (2000–2005)	The Recovery Tour (2010–2013)

The Anger Management Tour was a rap and rock music tour, founded and started in the fall of 2000 by Limp Bizkit, Papa Roach and, after the release of The Marshall Mathers LP, Eminem.

== History ==
The first "Anger Management" outing took place in 2000. The tour began two days after the release of Chocolate Starfish and the Hot Dog Flavored Water on October 19, 2000. On the first leg Limp Bizkit and Eminem co-headlined with support from D12, Papa Roach and Xzibit. They played through November 21, 2000. Four dates on the first leg were cancelled or rescheduled due to Fred Durst's swollen vocal chords. October 24 and November 3, 15 and 19.

The second leg occurred from November 24 till December 19, 2000 with support from DMX, Godsmack and Sinisstar in tow. Limp Bizkit finished the leg as headliners as it was the only Anger Management tour where Eminem did not finish, and instead, Limp Bizkit headlined over him. In this leg, three further dates were cancelled on November 26 and December 13 and 14. Rapper DMX missed four shows on the tour including a stop on December 17, where there was an issue and had to cancel his performance.

The other acts continued the tour and on December 19, 2000, during the final show at Limp Bizkit's hometown in Jacksonville, Florida, DMX came out to perform an acapella sing-along to one of Limp Bizkit's songs during their set. Finally, at the end of the night, DMX gave a prayer to the audience, saying he will do better for the Lord and himself. During the concert at some point during Limp's set some fans stormed Limp Bizkit's tour bus and took all the band members clothes. Despite this, the tour ended on a high-note for Limp Bizkit, who were leading the charge of the Nu Metal wave at the time and had enjoyed great and tremendous success during this era.

The tour was supported by the acts' then-recent album releases which included Infest by Papa Roach and finally, Xzibit's soon-to-be released major label debut, Restless in December of that year. Both Eminem and Limp Bizkit had album releases they were supporting on this tour that had sold over a million copies in their first week.

Anger Management 2001 took place in Europe with Eminem headlining the first leg in February with support from OutKast, Xzibit and D12. Guest artists like Dr. Dre, Dido and Marilyn Manson appeared at select dates.

Limp Bizkit and Godsmack would finish the second leg during May and June 2001.

Eminem would headline future editions going forward.

The second tour took place in the summer of 2002. Eminem said "It's basically the same thing that it was the last Anger Management Tour without Limp Bizkit... Papa Roach are still cool though." Headlined by Eminem with support from Papa Roach, Ludacris, Xzibit, X-Ecutioners and Bionic Jive. The tour ran from July 18 to September 8, lasting 32 dates.

Anger Management 2003 took place in Japan and Europe with support from 50 Cent, Cypress Hill, D12, Xzibit and Obie Trice. During a stop in Milton Keynes, UK, fans grew restless and agitated at the prolonged 'stage changeovers' between artists and threw bottles of liquid (alcohol, water, and urine) at the stage. It was the last rock inclusion of the tour with Cypress Hill playing a mix of rap rock along with their hip hop tracks during their run of the tour.

The third tour took place in the summer of 2005. 50 Cent missed the tour's first two stops because of a scheduling conflict; he was tied up shooting his film debut. Ludacris filled in on these dates.

== Artists ==
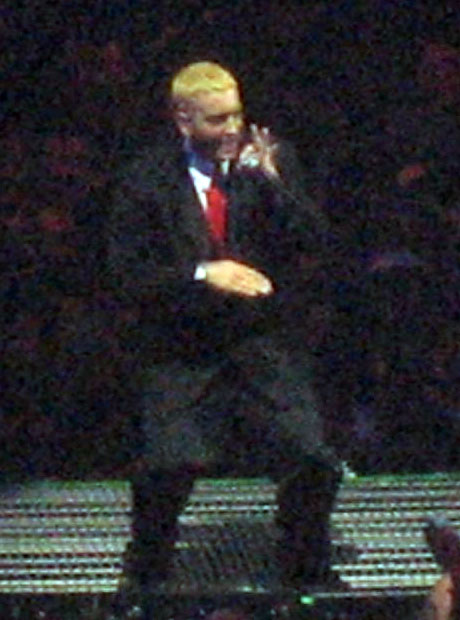
Eminem performing on the Anger Management Tour

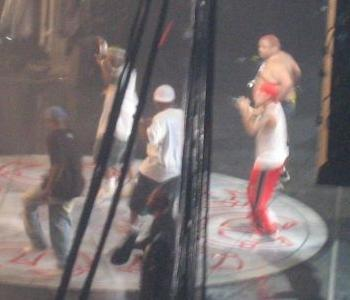
D12 performing on the Anger Management Tour

- Limp Bizkit
- Eminem
- Papa Roach
- Xzibit
- Godsmack
- DMX
- Sinisstar
- D12
- Outkast
- Dr. Dre
- Dido
- Snoop Dogg
- Marilyn Manson
- Ludacris
- X-Ecutioners
- Nate Dogg
- Dina Rae
- Obie Trice
- 50 Cent
- Cypress Hill
- Lil Jon & The East Side Boyz
- G-Unit
- Stat Quo
- Lil Scrappy
- Pitbull
- Hush
- Mase
- Akon
- Lloyd Banks
- Young Buck
- Olivia
- Flipsyde
- Bionic Jive

== Tour dates ==
1st edition

USA: Limp Bizkit, Eminem (until 21 November), Papa Roach (until 21 November), Xzibit (until 21 November), DMX (started 24 November), Godsmack (started 24 November), Sinisstar (started 24 November)

Europe 2001: Eminem, Xzibit, OutKast, D12 (February 2–10)

Europe 2001: Limp Bizkit, Godsmack (May 9 - June 16)

Date	City	Country	Venue
North America
October 19, 2000	East Rutherford	United States	Continental Airlines Arena
October 20, 2000	East Rutherford	United States	Continental Airlines Arena
October 21, 2000	Buffalo	United States	HSBC Arena
October 23, 2000	Worcester	United States	Worcester's Centrum Centre
October 26, 2000	Toronto	Canada	SkyDome
October 27, 2000	Montreal	Canada	Molson Centre
October 29, 2000	Auburn Hills	United States	The Palace of Auburn Hills
October 30, 2000	Rosemont	United States	Allstate Arena
November 1, 2000	Milwaukee	United States	Bradley Center
November 2, 2000	Champaign	United States	Assembly Hall
November 3, 2000	Indianapolis	United States	Conseco Fieldhouse
November 5, 2000	Moline	United States	The MARK of the Quad Cities
November 6, 2000	St. Louis	United States	Savvis Center
November 8, 2000	Minneapolis	United States	Target Center
November 10, 2000	Denver	United States	Pepsi Center
November 13, 2000	Tacoma	United States	Tacoma Dome
November 14, 2000	Portland	United States	Rose Garden Arena
November 17, 2000	Daly City	United States	Cow Palace
November 18, 2000	Sacramento	United States	ARCO Arena
November 21, 2000	Anaheim	United States	Arrowhead Pond of Anaheim
November 24, 2000	Inglewood	United States	Great Western Forum
November 26, 2000	San Diego	United States	San Diego Sports Arena
November 28, 2000	San Antonio	United States	Alamodome
November 29, 2000	Houston	United States	Compaq Center
November 30, 2000	Dallas	United States	Reunion Arena
December 2, 2000	New Orleans	United States	New Orleans Arena
December 3, 2000	Birmingham	United States	BJCC Arena
December 5, 2000	Columbus	United States	Value City Arena
December 6, 2000	Lexington	United States	Rupp Arena
December 7, 2000	Detroit	United States	Joe Louis Arena
December 9, 2000	Hartford	United States	Hartford Civic Center
December 10, 2000	Washington, D.C.	United States	MCI Center
December 11, 2000	Albany	United States	Pepsi Arena
December 13, 2000	Greensboro	United States	Greensboro Coliseum
December 14, 2000	Greenville	United States	BI-LO Center
December 15, 2000	Charlotte	United States	Charlotte Coliseum
December 17, 2000	Tampa	United States	Ice Palace
December 18, 2000	Sunrise	United States	National Car Rental Center
December 19, 2000	Jacksonville	United States	Jacksonville Veterans Memorial Coliseum
Europe
February 2, 2001	Hamburg	Germany	Alsterdorfer Sporthalle
February 3, 2001	Oslo	Norway	Oslo Spektrum
February 4, 2001	Stockholm	Sweden	Stockholm Globe Arena
February 5, 2001	Rotterdam	Netherlands	Rotterdam Ahoy
February 6, 2001	Brussels	Belgium	Forest National
February 7, 2001	Paris	France	Palais Omnisports de Paris-Bercy
February 8, 2001	Manchester	England	Manchester Evening News Arena
February 9, 2001	London	England	London Arena
February 10, 2001	London	England	London Arena
North America
May 9, 2001	Mexico City	Mexico	Palacio de los Deportes
Europe Leg II
May 16, 2001	Amsterdam	Netherlands	Heineken Music Hall
May 22, 2001	Lisbon	Portugal	Pavilhão Atlântico
May 25, 2001	Assago	Italy	FilaForum di Assago
May 26, 2001	Assago	Italy	FilaForum di Assago
May 28, 2001	Paris	France	Palais Omnisports de Paris-Bercy
May 29, 2001	Merksem	Belgium	Sportpaleis
May 31, 2001	Vienna	Austria	Wiener Stadthalle - Halle D
June 1, 2001	Nuremberg	Germany	Rock im Park 2001
June 3, 2001	Nürburg	Germany	Rock im Park 2001
June 4, 2001	Landgraaf	Netherlands	Pinkpop 2001
June 6, 2001	London	England	Wembley Arena
June 7, 2001	London	England	Wembley Arena
June 9, 2001	Glasgow	Scotland	Scottish Exhibition and Conference Centre
June 10, 2001	Manchester	England	Manchester Evening News Arena
June 12, 2001	Oberhausen	Germany	Arena Oberhausen
June 13, 2001	Bremen	Germany	Stadthalle
June 14, 2001	Hultsfred	Sweden	Hultsfredfestivalen 2001
June 16, 2001	Seinäjoki	Finland	Provinssirock 2001

2nd edition

USA: Eminem, Papa Roach, Ludacris, Xzibit, The X-Ecutioners and Bionic Jive (until 7 August)

Japan: Eminem, 50 Cent, D12, Obie Trice

Europe: Eminem, 50 Cent, Cypress Hill, Xzibit, D12

Date	City	Country	Venue
North America
July 18, 2002	Buffalo	United States	HSBC Arena
July 19, 2002	Hartford	United States	ctnow.com Meadows Music Theatre
July 20, 2002	Scranton	United States	Ford Pavilion at Montage Mountain
July 21, 2002	Bristow	United States	Nissan Pavilion at Stone Ridge
July 22, 2002	East Rutherford	United States	Continental Airlines Arena
July 25, 2002	Camden	United States	Tweeter Center at the Waterfront
July 26, 2002	Wantagh	United States	Tommy Hilfiger at Jones Beach Theater
July 27, 2002	Mansfield	United States	Tweeter Center for the Performing Arts
July 30, 2002	Cleveland	United States	CSU Convocation Center
July 31, 2002	Noblesville	United States	Verizon Wireless Music Center
August 1, 2002	Rosemont	United States	Allstate Arena
August 2, 2002	Saint Paul	United States	Xcel Energy Center
August 5, 2002	Nampa	United States	Idaho Center Arena
August 6, 2002	Tacoma	United States	Tacoma Dome
August 7, 2002	Portland	United States	Rose Garden
August 10, 2002	Wheatland	United States	AutoWest Amphitheatre
August 11, 2002	Mountain View	United States	Shoreline Amphitheatre
August 12, 2002	Fresno	United States	Selland Arena
August 15, 2002	Chula Vista	United States	Coors Amphitheatre
August 16, 2002	San Bernardino	United States	Blockbuster Pavilion
August 17, 2002	Las Vegas	United States	Thomas & Mack Center
August 20, 2002	Phoenix	United States	America West Arena
August 21, 2002	Albuquerque	United States	Tingley Coliseum
August 22, 2002	Greenwood Village	United States	Fiddler's Green Amphitheatre
August 24, 2002	Maryland Heights	United States	UMB Bank Pavilion
August 25, 2002	Bonner Springs	United States	Verizon Wireless Amphitheater
August 31, 2002	Tampa	United States	Ice Palace
September 1, 2002	Sunrise	United States	National Car Rental Center
September 4, 2002	Atlanta	United States	HiFi Buys Amphitheatre
September 8, 2002	Auburn Hills	United States	The Palace of Auburn Hills
Asia
May 23, 2003	Chiba	Japan	Makuhari Event Hall
May 24, 2003	Chiba	Japan	Makuhari Event Hall
Europe
June 13, 2003	Essen	Germany	Georg-Melches-Stadion
June 15, 2003	Hamburg	Germany	AOL Arena
June 17, 2003	Amsterdam	Netherlands	Amsterdam Arena
June 18, 2003	Amsterdam	Netherlands	Amsterdam Arena
June 19, 2003	Paris	France	Palais Omnisports de Paris-Bercy
June 21, 2003	Milton Keynes	England	National Bowl
June 22, 2003	Milton Keynes	England	National Bowl
June 23, 2003	Milton Keynes	England	National Bowl
June 24, 2003	Glasgow	Scotland	Hampden Park
June 26, 2003	County Kildare	Ireland	Punchestown Racecourse
June 27, 2003	County Kildare	Ireland	Punchestown Racecourse

3rd edition

Eminem, 50 Cent, Lil Jon & the East Side Boyz, G-Unit, D12, Obie Trice, Stat Quo, Lil Scrappy, Pitbull, Ludacris (replaced 50 Cent on first two shows)

Date	City	Country	Venue
North America
July 7, 2005	Noblesville	United States	Verizon Wireless Music Center
July 8, 2005	Columbus	United States	Germain Amphitheater
July 11, 2005	Tinley Park	United States	Tweeter Center Chicago
July 12, 2005	Tinley Park	United States	Tweeter Center Chicago
July 14, 2005	Denver	United States	Pepsi Center
July 17, 2005	Auburn	United States	White River Amphitheatre
July 19, 2005	San Jose	United States	HP Pavilion at San Jose
July 20, 2005	San Jose	United States	HP Pavilion at San Jose
July 22, 2005	Chula Vista	United States	Coors Amphitheatre
July 23, 2005	San Bernardino	United States	Hyundai Pavilion
July 24, 2005	Las Vegas	United States	Thomas & Mack Center
July 26, 2005	Phoenix	United States	Cricket Pavilion
July 28, 2005	Dallas	United States	Smirnoff Music Centre
July 29, 2005	Selma (San Antonio)	United States	Verizon Wireless Amphitheater
July 31, 2005	Atlanta	United States	HiFi Buys Amphitheatre
August 1, 2005	Tampa	United States	Ford Amphitheatre
August 2, 2005	West Palm Beach	United States	Sound Advice Amphitheatre
August 5, 2005	Bristow	United States	Nissan Pavilion at Stone Ridge
August 6, 2005	Philadelphia	United States	Lincoln Financial Field
August 8, 2005	New York City	United States	Madison Square Garden
August 9, 2005	New York City	United States	Madison Square Garden
August 10, 2005	Mansfield	United States	Tweeter Center
August 12, 2005	Detroit	United States	Comerica Park
August 13, 2005	Detroit	United States	Comerica Park

Cancellations and rescheduled shows

November 15, 2000	Vancouver, Canada	General Motors Place	Cancelled
September 1, 2005	Hamburg, Germany	Trabrennbahn Bahrenfeld	Cancelled
September 2, 2005	Copenhagen, Denmark	Parken Stadium	Cancelled
September 3, 2005	Gothenburg, Sweden	Ullevi	Cancelled
September 5, 2005	Gelsenkirchen, Germany	Veltins-Arena	Cancelled
September 6, 2005	Amsterdam, Netherlands	Amsterdam Arena	Cancelled
September 7, 2005	Paris, France	Stade de France	Cancelled
September 9, 2005	Milton Keynes, England	National Bowl	Cancelled
September 10, 2005	Milton Keynes, England	National Bowl	Cancelled
September 12, 2005	Edinburgh, Scotland	Murrayfield Stadium	Cancelled
September 14, 2005	Manchester, England	Old Trafford Cricket Ground	Cancelled
September 15, 2005	Manchester, England	Old Trafford Cricket Ground	Cancelled
September 17, 2005	Slane, Ireland	Slane Castle	Cancelled

=== 2013 ===
In December 2012, it was confirmed that Eminem would finally perform at Slane Castle in Ireland on August 17, 2013, 8 years after cancelling the European part of the 2005 tour.

== DVD ==
Anger Management Tour
- DVD release of a 2002 performance
- Genre: Hip hop/rap, dirty rap, hardcore rap, gangsta rap
- Dates: Fall, Summer
- Location: United States
- Years active: 2000–2003, 2005
- Founders: Limp Bizkit, Eminem, Papa Roach, Ludacris, Xzibit, X-Ecutioners, Bionic Jive, 50 Cent, D12, Obie Trice

In 2002 a DVD of the 2001 Anger Management Tour Europe was released and contains backstage footage with D12, Xzibit, Marilyn Manson, and Dido.

All Access Europe was released on June 18, 2002.

Track list

1. "Hamburg"
2. "Oslo"
3. "Stockholm"
4. "Amsterdam"
5. "Brussels"
6. "Paris"
7. "Manchester"
8. "London"

In 2005 a DVD of the 2002 performance in Detroit, Michigan, was released and features behind-the-scenes footage as well as Eminem's performance in its entirety and special guests D12 and Obie Trice.

Eminem Presents the Anger Management Tour was released on July 4, 2005.

Track list

1. "Square Dance"
2. "Business"
3. "White America"
4. "Kill You"
5. "When the Music Stops" (featuring D12)
6. "Pimp Like Me" (featuring D12)
7. "Fight Music" (featuring D12)
8. "Purple Pills" (featuring D12)
9. "Stan"
10. "The Way I Am"
11. "Soldier"
12. "Cleanin' Out My Closet"
13. "Forgot About Dre"
14. "Drips" (featuring Obie Trice)
15. "Superman" (featuring Dina Rae)
16. "Drug Ballad" (featuring Dina Rae)
17. "Just Don't Give a Fuck"
18. "Sing for the Moment"
19. "Without Me"
20. "My Dad's Gone Crazy"

In 2007 a DVD of the 2005 performance in New York City's Madison Square Garden was released and features Eminem's performance shot by Showcase Network in its entirety, plus special guests D12, Obie Trice, and Stat Quo. In 2009, a BD of the same performance was released. This was the last performance to feature Proof before his death in 2006.

Eminem Live From New York was released on November 13, 2007.

Track list

1. "Backstage Pt. 1"
2. "Evil Deeds"
3. "Mosh"
4. "Business"
5. "Rain Man"
6. "Ass Like That"
7. "Puke"
8. "Kill You"
9. "Like Toy Soldiers"
10. "Git' Up" (featuring D12)
11. "How Come" (featuring D12)
12. "Rockstar" (featuring Bizarre of D12)
13. "40 Oz" (featuring D12)
14. "My Band" (featuring D12)
15. "Backstage Pt. 2"
16. "Stan"
17. "The Way I Am"
18. "Just Don't Give a Fuck"
19. "Got Some Teeth" (featuring Obie Trice)
20. "Stay 'Bout It" (featuring Obie Trice & Stat Quo)
21. "The Setup (You Don't Know)" (featuring Obie Trice)
22. "Like Dat" (featuring Stat Quo)
23. "Cleanin' Out My Closet"
24. "Mockingbird"
25. "Just Lose It"
26. "Backstage Pt. 3"
27. "Lose Yourself" (featuring D12)
