= Lucky You (Eminem song) =

Single by Eminem featuring Joyner Lucas

Single by Eminem featuring Joyner Lucas

from the album Kamikaze
- Released: November 30, 2018
- Recorded: February 2018
- Genre: Hip-hop
- Length: 4:04
- Label: Shady; Aftermath; Interscope
- Songwriters: Marshall Mathers; Gary Lucas; Mustafa Salih Fatah; Jahaan Sweet; Fraser
- Producers: Boi-1da; Illa da Producer; Eminem; Jahaan Sweet

Eminem singles chronology
"Venom" (2018)	"Lucky You" (2018)	"Homicide" (2019)

Joyner Lucas singles chronology
"I Love" (2018)	"Lucky You" (2018)	"Just Let Go" (2019)

Music video
- "Lucky You" on YouTube

"Lucky You" is a song by American rapper Eminem featuring fellow American rapper Joyner Lucas. It was sent to the UK contemporary hit radio on November 30, 2018, as the third single from Eminem's album Kamikaze. "Lucky You" was nominated for the Best Rap Song Grammy Award at the 61st annual awards ceremony. The single also reached the top 10 in Australia, Canada, Finland, Greece, Ireland, New Zealand, Norway, Portugal, Sweden, Switzerland, United Kingdom, and United States.

== Music video ==
On September 10, 2018, Eminem teased on his Instagram that a music video for the song would be released on September 12. The teaser included multiple men in black sweatshirts falling from the sky onto a dirt ground. The video was not released on September 12, leading Eminem to later post another trailer for the music video, saying it would be released on the next day instead.

The official video, directed by James Larese, was released on September 13, 2018. In the video, it follows Eminem and Lucas in combat vests and pants strolling throughout the ruins of a city. It includes wrecked cars and abandoned buildings. Throughout the video, multiple hooded men with black sweatshirts appear to be "copying" whatever the rappers are doing. This is supposed to be a shot at the new generation of rappers copying what the bigger artists are doing. One scene includes them performing random dances, which the hooded men copied. In the middle of Eminem's verse, a gunshot from the original track goes off, sending the hooded men into the sky. The video ends with the two rappers walking away from the swarm.

== Awards and nominations ==
Year	Ceremony	Award	Result
2019	Grammy Awards (61st)	Best Rap Song	Nominated

== Track listing ==
Digital Download

No.	Title	Writer(s)	Producer(s)	Length
1.	"Lucky You"	Marshall Mathers; Matthew Samuels; Jahaan Sweet; Gary Lucas; Fraser	Boi-1da; Illa da Producer; Eminem; Jahaan Sweet	4:04

== Personnel ==
- Eminem - lead vocals, production, mixing
- Joyner Lucas - vocals
- Boi-1da - production
- Illa Da Producer - production
- Jahaan Sweet - production
- Brian "Nox Beatz" Eisner - additional mixing/recording/arrangement
- Dr. Dre - executive production

== Charts ==
=== Weekly charts ===
Weekly chart performance for "Lucky You"
Chart (2018)	Peak position
Australia (ARIA)	4
Austria (Ö3 Austria Top 40)	13
Belgium (Ultratop 50 Flanders)	46
Belgium (Ultratip Bubbling Under Wallonia)	27
Canada Hot 100 (Billboard)	3
Czech Republic Singles Digital (ČNS IFPI)	3
Denmark (Tracklisten)	11
Finland (Suomen virallinen lista)	2
France (SNEP)	31
Germany (GfK)	19
Greece Digital International Singles (IFPI)	1
Hungary (Single Top 40)	24
Hungary (Stream Top 40)	3
Ireland (IRMA)	7
Italy (FIMI)	24
Malaysia (RIM)	19
Netherlands (Global Top 40)	2
Netherlands (Single Top 100)	14
Netherlands (Streaming Top 40)	12
New Zealand (Recorded Music NZ)	2
Norway (VG-lista)	4
Portugal (AFP)	3
Slovakia Singles Digital (ČNS IFPI)	2
Spain (Promusicae)	88
Sweden (Sverigetopplistan)	3
Switzerland (Schweizer Hitparade)	2
UK Singles (OCC)	6
US Billboard Hot 100	6
US Hot R&B/Hip-Hop Songs (Billboard)	5

=== Year-end charts ===
Annual chart rankings for "Lucky You"
Chart (2018)	Position
Netherlands (Global Top 40)	83
Portugal (AFP)	145
US Hot R&B/Hip-Hop Songs (Billboard)	71

== Certifications ==
Region	Certification	Certified units/sales
Australia (ARIA)	4× Platinum	280,000^{‡}
Austria (IFPI Austria)	Gold	15,000^{‡}
Brazil (Pro-Música Brasil)	2× Platinum	80,000^{‡}
Canada (Music Canada)	Platinum	80,000^{‡}
Denmark (IFPI Danmark)	Gold	45,000^{‡}
France (SNEP)	Gold	100,000^{‡}
Italy (FIMI)	Gold	25,000^{‡}
New Zealand (RMNZ)	2× Platinum	60,000^{‡}
Portugal (AFP)	Platinum	10,000^{‡}
United Kingdom (BPI)	Platinum	600,000^{‡}
United States (RIAA)	3× Platinum	3,000,000^{‡}
^{‡} Sales+streaming figures based on certification alone.

== Release history ==
Region	Date	Format	Label	Ref.
United Kingdom	November 30, 2018	Contemporary hit radio	Polydor	
