= Good Guy =

2018 song by Eminem

Song by Eminem featuring Jessie Reyez

from the album Kamikaze
- Released: August 31, 2018
- Studio: Effigy Studios (Detroit, MI)
- Genre: Hip hop
- Length: 2:22
- Label: Shady; Aftermath; Interscope
- Songwriters: Marshall Mathers; Jessie Reyez; Ray Fraser; Yutaka Yamada; Norio Joseph Aono; Lisa Gomamoto
- Producers: Illadaproducer; Eminem (add.)

Music video
- "Good Guy" on YouTube

"Good Guy" is a song by American rapper Eminem from his tenth studio album Kamikaze, released on August 31, 2018, via Shady Records. Recording sessions took place at Effigy Studios in Detroit. Produced by Illadaproducer with additional production by Em, it features guest vocals by Canadian singer Jessie Reyez and a looped vocal sample through the song from "Glassy Sky" (Tokyo Ghoul) by Yutaka Yamada, sung by AmaLee. Despite never being released as a single, the song has managed to chart in several countries. On December 7, 2018, the accompanying music video was released.

== Music video ==
The music video for the song was released on December 7, 2018. The video features a violent altercation between the two artists, resulting in Reyez killing Eminem.

== Critical reception ==
In a review of Kamikaze for The Guardian, Alexis Petridis wrote that "Good Guy" might be "[t]he weakest thing" on the album, describing it as "a frailty-thy-name-is-woman saga of infidelity, marked both by a dreary beat and the sense that Eminem's heart really isn't in it". Reviewing the album for HipHopDX, Trent Clark referred to "Good Guy" and "Nice Guy" as "'Kim'-lite yawners".

== Personnel ==
- Marshall Mathers – main artist, vocals, additional producer, mixing, songwriter
- Jessie Reyez – featured artist, vocals, songwriter
- Ray Fraser – producer, songwriter
- Luis Resto – additional keyboards
- Mike Strange – recording, mixing
- Joe Strange – recording
- Tony Campana – recording

== Charts ==
| Chart (2018) | Peak position |
|---|---|
| Australia (ARIA) | 46 |
| Austria (Ö3 Austria Top 40) | 61 |
| Canada Hot 100 (Billboard) | 41 |
| Czech Republic Singles Digital (ČNS IFPI) | 38 |
| France (SNEP) | 143 |
| Germany (GfK) | 98 |
| Netherlands (Single Top 100) | 93 |
| Slovakia Singles Digital (ČNS IFPI) | 21 |
| Sweden (Sverigetopplistan) | 59 |
| US Billboard Hot 100 | 67 |
| US Hot R&B/Hip-Hop Songs (Billboard) | 32 |

== Certifications ==
| Region | Certification | Certified units/sales |
|---|---|---|
| Australia (ARIA) | Gold | 35,000^{‡} |
| New Zealand (RMNZ) | Gold | 15,000^{‡} |
| United Kingdom (BPI) | Silver | 200,000^{‡} |
| United States (RIAA) | Gold | 500,000^{‡} |
^{‡} Sales+streaming figures based on certification alone.
