= Rock im Park 2001 =

Video by Limp Bizkit
- Released: March 31, 2008
- Recorded: June 1, 2001
- Venue: Frankenstadion (Nuremberg) (as part of Rock im Park)
- Genres: Nu metal, rap metal
- Length: 86:53
- Label: Liberation

Limp Bizkit video chronology
Greatest Videoz (2005)	Rock im Park 2001 (2008)

Rock im Park 2001 is a live album and DVD by the American rap rock band Limp Bizkit. Released in 2008, it features a performance from June 1, 2001, by the band at the Rock im Park festival in Nuremberg, Germany. In the UK, it was released as an album with a bonus DVD containing video of the performance, while the video was solely released as a DVD in the United States.

The performance was re-released as vinyl and CD as a Black Friday Record Store Day exclusive in November 11, 2024, via Culture Factory USA label. Additionally, the Record Store Day version is available for streaming on Apple Music.

== Production and content ==
Limp Bizkit's set at the Rock im Park festival in Nuremberg, Germany was filmed and recorded. The video portion of the album featured one of the band's last performances with Wes Borland before he left the band in 2001. The band performed some of their best known and hit songs, accompanied by a dancer dressed as one of the creatures on the cover of their album Chocolate Starfish and the Hot Dog Flavored Water. During the performance, Borland wore body paint, and Fred Durst performed a portion of the set in the audience.

== Music and lyrics ==
The music of Rock im Park 2001 has predominantly been described as nu metal and is noted for "kinetic, frenzied energy". On this compilation, DJ Lethal functions as a sound designer for the band, shaping their sound. According to Lethal, "I try and bring new sounds, not just the regular chirping scratching sounds. [...] It's all different stuff that you haven't heard before. I'm trying to be like another guitar player."

Wes Borland's guitar playing in this performance is experimental and nontraditional, and is noted for creative use of a seven-string guitar. His guitar playing makes use of octave shapes, and choppy, eighth-note rhythms, sometimes accompanied by muting his strings with his left hand, creating a percussive sound. Borland's guitar playing also has unevenly accented syncopated sixteenth notes to create a disorienting effect, and hypnotic, droning licks.

Durst's lyrics are often profane, scatological or angry. Much of Durst's lyrical inspiration came from growing up and his personal life. His breakups have inspired the songs "Nookie" and "Re-Arranged".

== Reception ==
Professional ratings
Review scores
Source	Rating
AllMusic	1.5/5 stars

AllMusic writer Greg Prato panned the release. Prato in particular was critical of Durst's performance on the set, writing, "[he] seems not all that interested in working the crowd or putting his heart into the performance at hand." Prato concluded, "Perhaps it's best to look at Rock in the Park 2001 as John Waters-esque footage that, years from now, will either become an underground hit due to its absurdity or an inadvertent "time period relic" à la Heavy Metal Parking Lot."

== Track listing ==
No.	Title	Length
1.	"Hot Dog" (from Chocolate Starfish and the Hot Dog Flavored Water)
2.	"Show Me What You Got" (from Significant Other)
3.	"Break Stuff" (from Significant Other)
4.	"The One" (from Chocolate Starfish and the Hot Dog Flavored Water)
5.	"Livin' It Up" (from Chocolate Starfish and the Hot Dog Flavored Water)
6.	"My Generation" (from Chocolate Starfish and the Hot Dog Flavored Water)
7.	"Re-Arranged" (from Significant Other)
8.	"Master of Puppets" (Metallica cover, from Master of Puppets)
9.	"Faith" (George Michael cover, from Three Dollar Bill, Yall$)
10.	"Full Nelson" (from Chocolate Starfish and the Hot Dog Flavored Water)
11.	"My Way" (from Chocolate Starfish and the Hot Dog Flavored Water)
12.	"Nookie" (from Significant Other)
13.	"I Would for You" (Jane's Addiction cover)
14.	"Take a Look Around" (from Chocolate Starfish and the Hot Dog Flavored Water)
15.	"Rollin' (Air Raid Vehicle)" (from Chocolate Starfish and the Hot Dog Flavored Water)

== Personnel ==
- Fred Durst - vocals
- Wes Borland - guitar, backing vocals
- Sam Rivers - bass, backing vocals
- John Otto - drums, percussion
- DJ Lethal - turntables, samples, keyboards
