= Venom (Eminem song) =

2018 single by Eminem

Single by Eminem

from the album Kamikaze
- Released: September 21, 2018
- Studio: Effigy Studios (Detroit, Michigan)
- Genre: Hip-hop
- Length: 4:29
- Label: Shady; Aftermath; Interscope
- Songwriters: Marshall Mathers; Luis Resto
- Producers: Eminem; Luis Resto

Eminem singles chronology
"Killshot" (2018)	"Venom" (2018)	"Lucky You" (2018)

Music video
- "Venom" on YouTube

"Venom (Music from the Motion Picture)", more commonly known as simply "Venom", is a song by American rapper Eminem, written for the soundtrack of the 2018 film of the same name and is featured on his tenth studio album Kamikaze as a second digital single released on September 21, 2018. Following the album's release, the track entered the charts in several countries, hitting the top 50 in the United States, Canada, and Australia. A remix to the song was released on October 5, 2021, two days after the release of Venom: Let There Be Carnage, the film's sequel. The remix was featured on a two-track version of Skylar Grey's "Last One Standing", a song that Eminem was also featured in for the sequel's soundtrack.

== Background ==
On August 30, 2018, Eminem posted a 15-seconds teaser showing Venom's title with the "E" turning to the "Ǝ", (used as Eminem's emblem). Seven hours later, on August 31, 2018, Eminem's previously unannounced album Kamikaze was released, and "Venom" appeared as its final track. On September 21, 2018, the track was released as a separate digital single on streaming services.

The song includes multiple references to the Venom film and to its title characters Venom and Eddie Brock.

== Music video ==
On October 3, 2018, Eminem teased on his Twitter account that a music video for the song would be released the following Friday. The music video was released on October 5, 2018. As a continuation to his previous "Fall" music video, its first scene shows a bystander finding the previously crushed Revival CD, opening the case to find a completely black disc. Just as it begins to react, he puts it in his bag and gets on a bus. As the song starts, an Eminem symbiote crawls up the man's neck, causing him to start rapping to the song, before he infects the bus driver by throwing him out the door, who then also starts rapping. The Eminem symbiote spreads around, transferring itself to innocent bystanders (and a dog) and making them cause damage to the town while rapping.

During the first part of the video, Eminem, is shown while performing the song inside of a dark room, dressed in all black with only one light shining in the background. In the final scene, after getting possessed by the symbiote, the final victim shown turns into Eminem himself to rap the final chorus, before turning into Sony's Spider-Man Universe/Marvel Comics' character Venom.

== Live performances ==
During the October 15, 2018 episode of the late-night television show Jimmy Kimmel Live!, Eminem performed the song at the 103rd floor of the Empire State Building in New York City. The performance was filmed on October 6, 2018, and it was part of an eight-minute video, directed by James Larese and featuring Mexican-American comedian Guillermo Rodriguez. The music video was shot on a Google Pixel 3.

== Track listing ==
Digital Download

No.	Title	Writer(s)	Producer(s)	Length
1.	"Venom"	Marshall Mathers; Luis Resto; Mario Resto	Eminem; Luis Resto; MetaphorsPhotos	4:29

== Charts ==
=== Weekly charts ===
Chart (2018–2021)	Peak position
Australia (ARIA)	25
Austria (Ö3 Austria Top 40)	39
Canada Hot 100 (Billboard)	15
Czech Republic Singles Digital (ČNS IFPI)	4
France (SNEP)	55
Germany (GfK)	77
Global 200 (Billboard)	188
Greece International Digital Singles (IFPI)	6
Hungary (Single Top 40)	3
Hungary (Stream Top 40)	4
Ireland (IRMA)	24
Italy (FIMI)	63
Lithuania (AGATA)	34
Netherlands (Single Top 100)	94
New Zealand (Recorded Music NZ)	32
Portugal (AFP)	49
Scottish Singles Sales (Official Charts)	25
Singapore (RIAS)	28
Slovakia Singles Digital (ČNS IFPI)	4
South Korea International (Gaon)	97
Sweden (Sverigetopplistan)	64
Switzerland (Schweizer Hitparade)	47
UK Singles (Official Charts)	16
US Billboard Hot 100	43
US Hot R&B/Hip-Hop Songs (Billboard)	21

=== Year-end charts ===
Chart (2018)	Position
Hungary (Single Top 40)	81

== Certifications ==
Region	Certification	Certified units/sales
Australia (ARIA)	4× Platinum	280,000^{‡}
Austria (IFPI Austria)	Platinum	30,000^{‡}
Brazil (Pro-Música Brasil)	3× Diamond	480,000^{‡}
Denmark (IFPI Danmark)	Gold	45,000^{‡}
France (SNEP)	Platinum	200,000^{‡}
Germany (BVMI)	Gold	200,000^{‡}
Italy (FIMI)	Platinum	100,000^{‡}
New Zealand (RMNZ)	2× Platinum	60,000^{‡}
Poland (ZPAV)	2× Platinum	100,000^{‡}
Portugal (AFP)	Gold	5,000^{‡}
Spain (Promusicae)	Gold	30,000^{‡}
United Kingdom (BPI)	Platinum	600,000^{‡}
United States (RIAA)	2× Platinum	2,000,000^{‡}
^{‡} Sales+streaming figures based on certification alone.

== Release history ==
Region	Date	Format	Label	Ref.
Various	September 21, 2018	Digital download	Aftermath; Shady; Interscope	
Italy	October 19, 2019	Contemporary hit radio	EMI	
