= Normal (Eminem song) =

Eminem song

Song by Eminem

from the album Kamikaze
- Released: August 31, 2018
- Studio: Effigy Studios (Detroit, MI)
- Genre: Hip hop
- Length: 3:42
- Label: Shady
- Songwriters: Marshall Mathers; Ray Fraser; Larry Griffin Jr.; Maurice Nichols; Ricky Sheldon; Erik Bodin; Yukimi Nagano; Fredrik Wallin; Håkan Wirenstrand
- Producers: Illadaproducer; Symbolyc One; Lonestarrmuzik; Swish Allnet (add.)

"Normal" is a song by American rapper Eminem from his tenth studio album Kamikaze. It was released as the album's fifth track on August 31, 2018, via Shady Records along with the rest of the album. Recording sessions took place at Effigy Studios in Detroit. Produced by Illadaproducer, Symbolyc One and Lonestarrmuzik, the song contains samples from Little Dragon's song "Seconds". Despite never being released as a single, the song has managed to chart worldwide.

The rapper speaks about a volatile, mutually toxic relationship that throws several parallels to the hit single "Love the Way You Lie". Tom Breihan of Stereogum wrote: "Eminem freaks out on an on-and-off girlfriend, accusing her of cheating or of getting back at him by dressing sexy when she goes out. He complains that she’s being “extra, like a fuckin’ terrestrial”. As the song progresses, he's rapping about putting tracking devices on her car or hitting her with a baseball bat. And that's where the plausible deniability comes in. Em's exaggerating things to ridiculous extents, so we know he's making dark jokes, not being serious. It's the most poisonous form of self-awareness, the kind that just dares you to get offended or triggered".

== Personnel ==
- Marshall Mathers – main artist, vocals, mixing, songwriter
- Ray Fraser – producer, songwriter
- Larry Griffin Jr. – producer, songwriter
- Maurice Nichols – producer, songwriter
- Ricky Sheldon – additional producer, songwriter
- Mike Strange – recording, mixing
- Joe Strange – recording
- Tony Campana – recording

== Charts ==
Chart (2018)	Peak position
Australia (ARIA)	33
Austria (Ö3 Austria Top 40)	46
Canada Hot 100 (Billboard)	27
Czech Republic Singles Digital (ČNS IFPI)	61
France (SNEP)	83
Germany (GfK)	71
Hungary (Stream Top 40)	30
Italy (FIMI)	70
Netherlands (Single Top 100)	66
Norway (VG-lista)	37
Slovakia Singles Digital (ČNS IFPI)	26
Sweden (Sverigetopplistan)	53
US Billboard Hot 100	39
US Hot R&B/Hip-Hop Songs (Billboard)	21

== Certifications ==
Region	Certification	Certified units/sales
Australia (ARIA)	Gold	35,000^{‡}
United States (RIAA)	Gold	500,000^{‡}
^{‡} Sales+streaming figures based on certification alone.
