= Darren Lavett =

Darren John Lavett (October 31, 1964 – October 11, 2012) was an American music video director, who directed videos for The Offspring, Bad Religion, Bush, Voodoo Glow Skulls, Claw Hammer, Testament and several other bands. He is probably best known for directing the videos of The Offspring's biggest hits "Come Out and Play" and "Self Esteem". He also directed Eminem's first music video, "Just Don't Give a Fuck".

Lavett attended El Camino Real High School in Woodland Hills, California, and graduated from San Diego State University.

Lavett produced the feature film L.A. cult classic Southlander.

Lavett was the great-grandson of famed composer of "April Showers", "California, Here I Come" and co-founder of Capitol Records, Buddy DeSylva.

Lavett died of sleep apnea on the evening of October 11, 2012.

== Selected music video filmography ==
- Beastie Boys – "So What'cha Want" (1992)
- Bad Religion – "Struck a Nerve" (1993)
- Collision – "Maximum Respect" (1993)
- Claw Hammer – "William Tell" (1993)
- Further – "Real Gone" (1993)
- Volume 10 – "Pistol Grip Pump" (1993)
- Further – "Surfing Pointers" (1994)
- New Kingdom – "Cheap Thrills" (1994)
- The Offspring – "Come Out and Play" (1994)
- The Offspring – "Self Esteem" (1995)
- Testament – "Low" (1994)
- Bad Religion – "Infected" (1995)
- Boogiemonsters – "Strange" (1994)
- Buffalo Tom – "Tangerine" (1995)
- Claw Hammer – "Hollow Legs" (1995)
- Fledgling – "Solomon's Crown" (1995)
- Goodie Mob – "Cell Therapy" (1995)
- Red Aunts – "Freakathon" (1995)
- Voodoo Glow Skulls – "Randy Gordo" (1995)
- New Kingdom – "Mexico or Bust" (1996)
- Red Aunts – "Eldrich Sauce" (1996)
- Red Aunts – "Palm Tree Swing" (1996)
- Bush – "Cold Contagious" (live version) (1997)
- Claw Hammer – "Queen's Lead Helmet" (1997)
- Richard Vission – "Drop the Beat" (1997)
- Goodie Mob – "They Don't Dance No More" (1998)
- Eminem – "Just Don't Give a Fuck" (1998)
- Keith Morris' Midget Hand Job – "Black Christmas Tree" (2001)
