= All Access Europe =

Video by Eminem
- Released: June 18, 2002
- Genre: Hip hop
- Length: 1:11:42
- Label: Shady; Aftermath; Interscope
- Producer: Eminem (exec.); Paul Rosenberg (exec.); Stuart Parr (exec.); Joel Martin; John Quigley; Anthony Garth; Courtney Holt

Eminem chronology
Ǝ (2000)	All Access Europe (2002)	Eminem Presents the Anger Management Tour (2005)

Professional ratings
Review scores
Source	Rating
AllMusic	3/5 stars

All Access Europe is a video album released by American rapper Eminem in 2002. The album contains segments of Eminem's live performances during a European tour intended to promote The Marshall Mathers LP. The album includes live guest appearances by "Stan" featuring Dido, "The Way I Am" featuring Marilyn Manson, and "Bitch Please II" featuring Xzibit, special features "Purple Pills" with D12 and "Forgot About Dre" with Dr. Dre.

The album peaked at number one on the Billboard's Music Video Sales chart and was certified Platinum by the Recording Industry Association of America and British Phonographic Industry.

== Track listing ==
No.	Title	Length
1.	"Hamburg, Germany"	9:51
2.	"Oslo, Norway"	6:05
3.	"Stockholm, Sweden"	3:35
4.	"Amsterdam, Holland"	9:33
5.	"Brussels, Belgium"	7:11
6.	"Paris, France"	15:49
7.	"Manchester, United Kingdom"	5:24
8.	"London, United Kingdom"	14:14
Total length:		1:11:42

== Charts ==
Chart (2002)	Peak position
Australian DVD chart (ARIA Charts)	1
Dutch Albums (Album Top 100)	10
US Music Video Sales (Billboard)	1

== Certifications ==
Region	Certification	Certified units/sales
Australia (ARIA)	2× Platinum	30,000^{^}
United Kingdom (BPI)	Platinum	50,000^{^}
United States (RIAA)	Platinum	100,000^{^}
^{^} Shipments figures based on certification alone.
