= Framed (Eminem song) =

Song by Eminem

from the album Revival
- Released: December 15, 2017
- Genre: Horrorcore
- Length: 4:13
- Label: Aftermath; Shady; Interscope
- Songwriters: Marshall Mathers; Farid Nassar; David John Byron; Kenneth William Hensley
- Producers: Fredwreck; Eminem (co.)

Music video
- "Framed" on YouTube

"Framed" is a song by American rapper Eminem. It was first released on December 15, 2017, as the twelfth track from his ninth studio album Revival. A music video for the song was released in April 2018.

== Composition ==
The song, produced by Fredwreck, samples Czechoslovak progressive rock band C&K Vocal's 1976 song "Pilgrim".

In the third verse of the song, the word "raping" is censored in the line: "Just escaped from the state pen for raping eight women who hate men."

== Music video ==
A music video for the song was released on April 3, 2018. This followed a trailer for the video that was previously released on March 28. As of March 2025, the video has received over 30 million views.

The video begins with Fox 2 News reporter Josh Landon playing the role of a reporter named Stan Dresden (referring to Eminem's song "Stan") on a CRT TV, stating: "It's been a terrifying two weeks in the city of Detroit after Marshall Mathers, professionally known as Eminem, escaped from an asylum." Then the music starts and Eminem raps the first verse in a forest and a house. After that the music cuts, the news reporter interviews a detective named Shelter (referring to a music venue of the same name, which was used as a rap battle venue for Eminem's character B-Rabbit in his film 8 Mile), who goes into the house that Eminem is in. Eminem raps the chorus of the song in that same house. The second verse starts in a forest, then cuts to the detective inside the house. Detective Shelter conducts an interrogation through the second chorus, but sees Eminem is in denial of the accusations. The third verse starts with a black screen that says "3 AM," referencing his song "3 a.m.," which also depicts mental issues and murder. Then he is taken back to the mental asylum, where he gets a needle shot into his arm as the video slowly fades.

== Live performances ==
The song made its live debut at Eminem's Coachella performance on April 15, 2018. The song was placed on most setlists for the Revival Tour.

== Reception ==
In a positive review, XXL called the song "eerie and awesome." In contrast, Consequence of Sound reacted negatively, stating, "his slow-motion yelling of the title aims for an unholy hybrid of Adam Sandler, Will Ferrell, and Pee-wee Herman, and somehow still falls short."

== Charts ==
Chart (2017)	Peak position
Ireland (IRMA)	80

== Legacy ==
On his 2018 song "The Ringer" from his follow-up album Kamikaze, Eminem references the U.S. Secret Service visiting him in response to lyrics on Revival perceived to be threatening towards then-president Donald Trump. BuzzFeed filed a Freedom of Information Act request with the Secret Service to find out if this was true. In October 2019, the Secret Service revealed to BuzzFeed that, in response to an email from a TMZ employee pressing the agency to investigate Eminem for his "threatening lyrics" about Ivanka Trump on "Framed," they had conducted a background check and arranged an interview, in which the interviewers read the verse out loud to Eminem—and he rapped along. The agency subsequently decided against referring the case to a federal prosecutor.
