= Revival Tour (Eminem) =

Concert run by Eminem

- Tour by Eminem
- Associated album: Revival
- Start date: June 30, 2018
- End date: July 15, 2018
- Legs: 1
- No. of shows: 11
- Attendance: 779,000 (approx.)

Eminem concert chronology
- The Monster Tour (2014); Revival Tour (2018)

The Revival Tour was Eminem's 2018 European concert run in support of his ninth studio album Revival. Its run was first announced in January 2018, when Eminem revealed a series of European dates following his festival appearances at Coachella, Bonnaroo, Firefly, and Boston Calling. This tour began on June 30, 2018 at the Oslo Sommertid Festival in Norway and included performances at major festivals such as Roskilde and OpenAir Frauenfeld, as well as arena and stadium shows across Sweden, Italy, Germany, the Netherlands, and the United Kingdom.

The run concluded at London's Twickenham Stadium on July 15, 2018, the second consecutive night of sold-out concerts, which were managed by The SES Group for security and crowd operations. Across its dates, the tour featured some of the largest European festival crowds of the summer and marked Eminem's return to large-scale international touring following the release of Revival.

== Background ==
In January 2018, Eminem announced a series of European concert dates to accompany his festival appearances scheduled throughout the year, including Coachella, Bonnaroo, Firefly, and Boston Calling. The announcement followed the release of his ninth studio album Revival in December 2017 and marked his return to large-scale international performances.

The run, described in media reporting as a European "Revival" tour, featured a mix of major festival headlines and solo stadium dates across the continent. Eminem was already set to headline several high-profile festivals in the United States earlier in the year, and the European leg expanded his touring schedule with additional shows in Norway, Sweden, Denmark, Switzerland, Italy, Germany, the Netherlands, and the United Kingdom.

The tour concluded on July 15, 2018 at Twickenham Stadium in London, the second consecutive night of sold-out concerts, where security and crowd management were overseen by The SES Group. These performances represented some of Eminem's largest European audiences of 2018.

== Opening acts ==
The Revival Tour featured a rotating lineup of support artists that varied by city and festival. Official announcements listed several hip-hop acts as part of the European run, including 2 Chainz, Pusha T, Prophets of Rage, Royce da 5'9", Travis Scott , The Weeknd and Boogie.

For the Oslo date, Norwegian artists OnklP & De Fjerne Slektningene and Klovner i Kamp were announced as local support. During the London shows at Twickenham Stadium, Eminem was joined onstage by 50 Cent as a special guest performer, appearing during the main set.

Skylar Grey also appeared at select performances to provide live vocals for collaborative songs such as "Walk on Water" and "Stan".

== Critical reception ==
The Revival Tour received generally positive reviews from critics, many of whom praised Eminem's energy, technical ability, and reliance on a career-spanning setlist. Reviewers frequently noted that the tour was stronger than the reception of the Revival album itself.

Critics highlighted Eminem's intense delivery, describing his performances as energetic and technically sharp, with rapid-fire verses executed with precision. Several reviews characterized the shows as a "masterclass in nostalgia", pointing to the dominance of songs such as "The Real Slim Shady", "Without Me", and "Lose Yourself", which consistently drew some of the loudest reactions from audiences.

Reports from London, Roskilde, and Stockholm described massive, highly engaged crowds, often singing along to nearly every word. Some reviewers also commented on a noticeable evolution in Eminem's stage persona, depicting him as a more mature and reflective performer compared to his earlier, more chaotic "Slim Shady" era. While a few critics felt his stage presence showed moments of restraint, others emphasized that the performances retained a sense of urgency and "deviant vitality".

Production elements—including pyrotechnics, large-scale video screens, and 3D visual effects—were widely praised. Guest appearances from collaborators such as Skylar Grey and Royce da 5'9" were also highlighted for enhancing key moments in the set.

Overall, critical coverage described the Revival Tour as a successful large-scale live spectacle that delivered crowd-pleasing performances to massive audiences across Europe and North America.

== Tour dates ==
Date (2018)	City	Country	Venue	Attendance	Revenue
April 15	Indio	United States	Coachella	—N/a	—N/a
April 22	Indio	United States	Coachella	—N/a	—N/a
May 27	Boston	United States	Boston Calling Music Festival	—N/a	—N/a
June 2	New York City	United States	Governors Ball Music Festival	—N/a	—N/a
June 16	Dover	United States	Firefly Music Festival	—N/a	—N/a
June 30	Oslo	Norway	Oslo Sommertid Festival	—N/a	—N/a
July 2	Stockholm	Sweden	Friends Arena	—N/a	—N/a
July 3	Roskilde	Denmark	Roskilde Festival	100.000+	
July 4	Milan	Italy	Milano Summer Festival	—N/a	—N/a
July 7	Werchter	Belgium	Rock Werchter	—N/a	—N/a
July 10	Zurich	Switzerland	Hallestadion	—N/a	—N/a
July 12	London	England	Twickenham Stadium	—N/a	—N/a
July 14	London	England	Twickenham Stadium	—N/a	—N/a
