= Untouchable (Eminem song) =

Promotional single by Eminem

from the album Revival
- Released: December 8, 2017
- Genre: Political hip hop; rap rock
- Length: 6:10
- Label: Aftermath; Interscope; Shady
- Songwriters: Marshall Mathers; Tommy Chong; Gaye Delorme; Richard Marin
- Producers: Mr. Porter; Emile; Mark Batson; Eminem

Eminem chronology
"Walk On Water" (2017)	"Untouchable" (2017)	"River" (2017)

Audio video
- "Untouchable" on YouTube

Lyric video
- "Untouchable" on YouTube

"Untouchable" is a song by American rapper Eminem, released on December 8, 2017. It is the fourth track from his ninth solo studio album Revival (2017). The song was produced by Mr. Porter, Emile Haynie, Mark Batson and Eminem. An audio video was uploaded to Eminem's Vevo channel on December 8, 2017. On February 15, 2018, a lyric video was uploaded to his Vevo channel.

== Background ==
Eminem stated on his website that he was going to release a new track on December 8. This led to the promotional single "Untouchable". The song features a sample from the song "Earache My Eye" by the comedy duo Cheech & Chong. The song is a heavily political song which blames the Republican Party for police brutality and institutional racism in the United States, also criticizing the philosophy of 'pull yourself up by the bootstraps', retorting, "where the fuck are the boots?" Marshall met Masta Ace a long time ago before song was made, according to DJMasterCee. The disc jockey said that Eminem got permission from Ace to use his lines on the Revival track and compared Mathers to Elvis Presley in hip hop.

== Reception ==
In a track-by-track guide to Revival, Rolling Stone described "Untouchable" as Eminem's "most ambitious political statement ever, expanding and deepening the critique of American racism that he started outlining 15 years ago on 'White America'". The magazine noted that the first half of the song is rapped "from the perspective of a racist white cop, laying out exactly how he profiles and terrorizes black communities", drawing comparisons to the second verse of Jay-Z's "99 Problems".

== Charts ==
Chart (2017)	Peak position
Australia (ARIA)	100
Canada Hot 100 (Billboard)	52
France (SNEP)	150
Germany (GfK)	88
Ireland (IRMA)	60
Latvia (DigiTop100)	70
New Zealand Heatseekers (RMNZ)	2
Portugal (AFP)	95
Scottish Singles Sales (Official Charts)	55
Sweden Heatseeker (Sverigetopplistan)	7
Switzerland (Schweizer Hitparade)	70
UK Singles (Official Charts)	73
US Billboard Hot 100	86
US Hot R&B/Hip-Hop Songs (Billboard)	36
