= Remind Me =

Remind Me may refer to:

- "Remind Me" (Brad Paisley and Carrie Underwood song), a song from the 2011 album This Is Country Music
- "Remind Me" (Conrad Sewell song), a song from the 2015 extended play All I Know
- "Remind Me" (Eminem song) a song by Eminem from the 2017 album Revival
- "Remind Me" (Röyksopp song), a song from the 2001 album Melody A.M.
- "Remind Me" (Tom Grennan song) a 2022 song
- "Remind Me" (Dorothy Fields and Jerome Kern song), a song for the 1940 show One Night in the Tropics
- "Remind Me", a song by Bastille from the 2022 album Give Me the Future + Dreams of the Past
- "Remind Me (Intro)", a song by Eminem from the 2017 album Revival
- "Remind Me", a song by Meghan Trainor from the 2022 album Takin' It Back
