= Chloraseptic (song) =

Eminem song

- Remix cover

Promotional single by Eminem featuring 2 Chainz and Phresher

from the album Revival
- Released: January 8, 2018
- Genre: Hip hop; hardcore hip hop; trap
- Length: 5:01 (original); 4:56 (remix)
- Label: Aftermath; Interscope; Shady
- Songwriter(s): Marshall Mathers; Denaun Porter; Erick Sermon; Parrish Smith
- Producer(s): Mr. Porter

"Chloraseptic" is a song recorded by American rapper Eminem, featuring guest vocals from American rapper Phresher. It was written by Eminem, Mr. Porter, Mark Batson, Erick Sermon, and Parrish Smith, with production handled by Mr. Porter. The song was featured on Eminem's ninth studio album Revival, released on December 15, 2017. A remix was released on January 8, 2018, featuring new guest verses from rappers 2 Chainz and Phresher, as well as Eminem himself.

== Background ==
The song's remix was released on January 8, 2018. It was announced the same day by Eminem via his Twitter account, tweeting the artwork and a link to the track. After facing heavy criticism for his previous album Revival, Eminem addresses the negative response to his album. Among the topics he addresses in his verse are the lackluster reception to the album's initial single "Walk on Water" featuring Beyoncé, and fans judging the album's heavy pop presence on the tracklist. He also criticizes reaction videos, saying "Y'all saw the track list and had a fit 'fore you heard it / So you formed your verdict while you sat with your arms crossed / Did your little reaction videos and talked over songs". Eminem also addresses the critique of his BET Hip Hop Awards freestyle aimed at President Trump, while also taking jabs at the president, saying in his verse, "Then I took a stand, went at Tan-Face, and practically cut my motherfuckin' fan base in half and still outsold you".

== Charts ==
Chart (2017)	Peak position
Canada (Canadian Hot 100)	89
France (SNEP)	164
Germany (GfK)	100
Ireland (IRMA)	64
Latvia (DigiTop100)	84
Sweden Heatseeker (Sverigetopplistan)	15
US Bubbling Under Hot 100 (Billboard)	18
