= Campaign Speech =

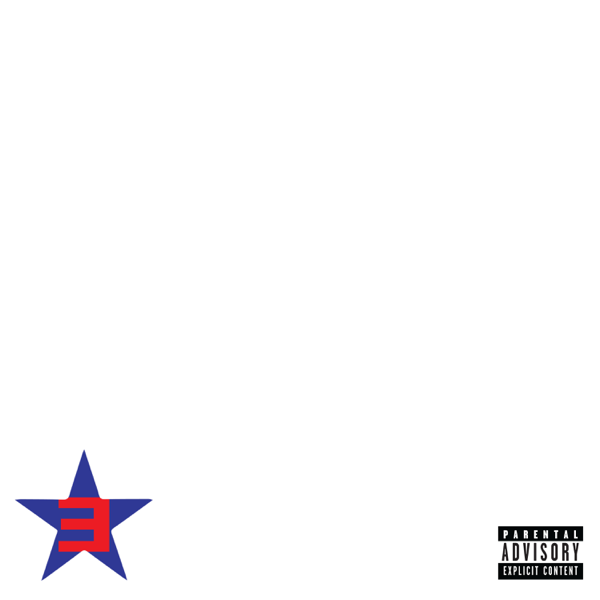

Promotional single by Eminem
- Released: October 19, 2016
- Recorded: 2016
- Genre: Political hip-hop; spoken word; freestyle rap
- Length: 7:49
- Label: Shady; Aftermath; Interscope
- Songwriters: Marshall Mathers; Denaun Porter; Emile Haynie; Mark Batson
- Producer: Eminem

Eminem chronology
"Kings Never Die" (2015)	"Campaign Speech" (2016)	"Walk On Water" (2017)

"Campaign Speech" is a freestyle rap song by American rapper Eminem, released on October 19, 2016, the same day of the third United States presidential debate, and 19 days before the 2016 presidential election. It was then released on October 22, 2016, on iTunes and streaming services such as Spotify.

== Composition ==
"Campaign Speech" is one of Eminem's longest songs to date and runs for nearly eight minutes, consisting of only one verse and no hook. In the song, Eminem disses Donald Trump and mentions other famous people such as Edward Norton, George Zimmerman, Dylann Roof, Colin Kaepernick, Robin Thicke, Ben Stiller and David Hasselhoff. The song features controversial lyrics, mostly regarding Roof, Trump, and Zimmerman.

== Release ==
On October 18, 2016, Eminem teased the single on his official Facebook page and mentioned that an upcoming album was in production. On Twitter, Eminem posted "Don't worry I'm working on an album! Here's something meanwhile", linking the song.

== Charts ==
Chart (2016)	Peak position
US Bubbling Under R&B/Hip-Hop Singles (Billboard)	9
