= Alice and the Glass Lake =

American singer (1987–2015)

- Born: Alicia Lemke; February 3, 1987; Madison, Wisconsin, U.S.
- Died: August 9, 2015 (aged 28)
- Other names: Alice Lake
- Years active: 2009–2015
- Website: www.aliceandtheglasslake.com

Alicia Lemke (February 3, 1987 – August 9, 2015), known professionally as Alice and the Glass Lake, was an American singer.

== Biography ==
Lemke was born in Madison, Wisconsin in 1987, and attended West High School. She appeared in Children's Theatre of Madison productions numerous times. She then attended Swarthmore College in Pennsylvania and Berklee College of Music in Boston. Lemke then moved to New York and began performing in clubs. Fans urged her to adopt a stage name to avoid confusion with Alicia Keys, so she chose the name Alice and the Glass Lake, which she chose as an ode to a lake in northern Wisconsin at which her family had a cabin. In 2009, Lemke created a YouTube channel where she uploaded videos of covers and original compositions.

On June 20, 2012, Internet celebrity Matt Harding released "Where the Hell is Matt? 2012", which used the song "Trip the Light", composed by Garry Schyman and sung by Lemke. In 2013, she opened a show for Fleetwood Mac. That year, she had also played at the Bonnaroo Music and Arts Festival in Tennessee. In August 2013, she released her first EP of electronic dream pop. In November, she was labeled as a rising star or artist to watch by Live Fast Magazine and Pigeons & People. In December of that year, she was diagnosed with a rare form of leukemia while on vacation in France.

=== Death and posthumous releases ===
Lemke died on August 9, 2015, from leukemia. She had been sending notes to her producer about her then-upcoming album Chimaera up to two days before her death. The album was posthumously released on November 18, 2016. CrypticRock gave it five stars out of five, and labeled it as one of its top five pop rock albums of 2016, saying, "Full of hope, pain, and angelic vocals, this is a must listen and surely secures this talented artist's legacy."

Canadian singer Kiesza, a longtime friend, wrote the song "Dearly Beloved" in Lemke's memory. The song was released on January 6, 2017. Lemke posthumously appeared on Eminem's 2017 album, Revival, in the title track "Revival (Interlude)". The vocals were taken from an unreleased song submitted to Eminem in 2012.

Two of Lemke's songs appeared in the 2017 Canadian film Suck It Up. Her song "Luminous" appeared in an episode of the fourth season of the television series Awkward, an episode of the fourth season of Station 19, and an episode of the first season of Billions.

== Discography ==
=== Studio albums ===
- Chimaera (2015)

=== Extended plays ===
- Shades of Motion (2010)
- Imaginary (2011)
- The Evolution EP (2013)

=== Appearances ===
- Eminem: Revival (2017)
