= Remind Me (Eminem song) =

2017 song by Eminem

Single by Eminem

from the album Revival
- Released: July 6, 2018
- Recorded: Effigy Studios in Detroit, Shangri La Studios in Malibu, CA
- Genre: Rap rock; hard rock
- Length: 3:45
- Label: Shady; Aftermath Entertainment; Interscope
- Songwriters: Marshall Mathers; Jake Richards; Allan Saches; Jesse Bonds Weaver Jr.; Matt Dike; Luther Rabb; James Walters; Marvin Young
- Producer: Rick Rubin

Eminem singles chronology
| "Nowhere Fast" (2018) | "Remind Me" (2018) | "Fall" (2018) |

"Remind Me" is the seventh track on Eminem's ninth studio album, Revival. The song features a sample of Joan Jett & the Blackhearts' 1981 hit "I Love Rock 'n' Roll." It was sent to Italian radio on July 6, 2018, as the album's fourth single.

== Background and release ==
The track was conceived as a continuation of the rock-sampling approach Eminem and Rick Rubin introduced on "Berzerk". The song was released to Italian radio stations on July 6, 2018, shortly before Eminem's first live performance in Italy at the Area Expo - Experience in Milan.

== Lyrics and themes ==
Lyrically, according to Rolling Stone, the song has Eminem rapping about a woman with exaggerated physical features, with comparisons made to Anna Nicole Smith. Reviewers have noted that, unlike some Slim Shady material, the track avoids derogatory language and keeps a playful, lighthearted tone.

== Composition and production ==
The song samples Joan Jett's recording of "I Love Rock and Roll" and was produced by Rubin. It has been described as built around a looping rock riff and a heavy, stomping beat. This approach follows the same production style Rubin and Eminem used on "Berzerk" and reflects Rubin's earlier work with the Beastie Boys. According to Rolling Stone, the song is a hard rock track. In an interview, Eminem recalled Rubin describing his production approach as doing what "feels right" rather than trying to anticipate audience reaction.

== Reception ==
In a review of Revival, one critic wrote that the song revolves around the Joan Jett sample, with the chorus changed to "I love you, 'cause you remind me of me". The review was critical of Eminem's use of heavy-guitar samples on the track, comparing it to songs such as "So Far". It described the song as filler rather than one of the album's more ambitious tracks. In a retrospective ranking of Eminem's albums, NME criticized his use of the "I Love Rock 'n' Roll" sample on the song. It described the song as part of what it viewed as the album's flawed rap-rock approach. The song became infamous for the line: “your booty is heavy duty, like diarrhea.”

== Charts ==
| Chart (2017-2018) | Peak position |
|---|---|
| Australia (ARIA) | 83 |
| Canada Hot 100 (Billboard) | 72 |
| Germany (GfK) | 51 |
| Ireland (IRMA) | 40 |
| Netherlands (Single Top 100) | 77 |
| Portugal (AFP) | 94 |
| Sweden (Sverigetopplistan) | 67 |
| Switzerland (Schweizer Hitparade) | 24 |
| UK Hip Hop/R&B (Official Charts) | 31 |
| US Bubbling Under Hot 100 (Billboard) | 21 |

== Credits and personnel ==
Adapted from the album's digital booklet:

- Eminem - vocals, songwriter
- Jake Richards - songwriter
- Allan Saches - songwriter
- Schoolly D - songwriter
- Matt Dike - songwriter
- Luther Rabb - songwriter
- James Walters - songwriter
- Young MC - songwriter
- Rick Rubin - producer, turntables
- Mr. Porter - backing vocals
- Dr. Dre - mixing
