= Fall (Eminem song) =

2018 single by Eminem

Single by Eminem

from the album Kamikaze
- Released: August 31, 2018
- Recorded: 2018
- Genre: Hip-hop, trap
- Length: 4:22
- Label: Shady; Aftermath; Interscope
- Songwriters: Marshall Mathers; BJ Burton; Luis Resto; Justin Vernon; Michael Williams II
- Producers: Mike Will Made It; Eminem

Eminem singles chronology
"Remind Me" (2018)	"Fall" (2018)	"Killshot" (2018)

Music video
- "Fall" on YouTube

"Fall" is a song by rapper Eminem, from his 2018 album Kamikaze. It was sent to Italian and UK contemporary hit radio on September 14, 2018, as the album's first single.

== Content ==
The song features uncredited vocals by American singer Justin Vernon, who performed the chorus and was credited as one of the co-writers. As other tracks from the album, "Fall" criticizes the contemporary hip-hop scene, dissing Joe Budden, DJ Akademiks, and Tyler, the Creator, among others.

The slur used to describe Tyler, the Creator, "faggot", generated controversy, with fans writing against Eminem on social media, and some fellow recording artists, including Imagine Dragons' Dan Reynolds and Australian singer Troye Sivan, publicly criticizing his lyrics. Justin Vernon distanced himself from the song's message, claiming he was not in the studio while Eminem recorded his vocals, and revealing he asked Eminem's entourage to change it, without any result. Interviewed by Sway, Eminem discussed his verses, claiming he knew he went "too far" with calling Tyler a "faggot", and apologized "because in my quest to hurt him, I realize that I was hurting a lot of other people by saying it". Several years later, Tyler, The Creator also apologized to Eminem.

Fall takes shots at critics & people who have expressed hate about Revival with the opening verse:

"You know, everybody's been tellin' me what they think about me for the last few months"

== Music video ==
On September 4, 2018, Eminem released a music video for the song, directed by James Larese. It was the first video to be released from Kamikaze. The video completely cut out the word "faggot" instead of having it back masked, like in the original song.

== Track listing ==
Digital download

No.	Title	Writer(s)	Producer(s)	Length
1.	"Fall"	Marshall Mathers; BJ Burton; Luis Resto; Justin Vernon; Michael Williams II	Mike Will Made It; Eminem	4:22

== Charts ==
Chart (2018)	Peak position
Australia (ARIA)	22
Austria (Ö3 Austria Top 40)	29
Belgium (Ultratip Bubbling Under Flanders)	16
Belgium (Ultratip Bubbling Under Wallonia)	4
Canada Hot 100 (Billboard)	4
Czech Republic Singles Digital (ČNS IFPI)	13
Denmark (Tracklisten)	21
France (SNEP)	87
Germany (GfK)	37
Greece Digital International Singles (IFPI)	4
Hungary (Single Top 40)	18
Hungary (Stream Top 40)	12
Ireland (IRMA)	15
Italy (FIMI)	59
Netherlands (Single Top 100)	43
New Zealand (Recorded Music NZ)	9
Norway (VG-lista)	20
Portugal (AFP)	33
Slovakia Singles Digital (ČNS IFPI)	6
Sweden (Sverigetopplistan)	23
Switzerland (Schweizer Hitparade)	7
UK Singles (Official Charts)	8
UK Hip Hop/R&B (Official Charts)	4
US Billboard Hot 100	12
US Hot R&B/Hip-Hop Songs (Billboard)	10

== Certifications ==
Region	Certification	Certified units/sales
Australia (ARIA)	2× Platinum	140,000^{‡}
Brazil (Pro-Música Brasil)	Gold	20,000^{‡}
Canada (Music Canada)	Gold	40,000^{‡}
Denmark (IFPI Danmark)	Gold	45,000^{‡}
New Zealand (RMNZ)	Platinum	30,000^{‡}
United Kingdom (BPI)	Gold	400,000^{‡}
United States (RIAA)	Platinum	1,000,000^{‡}
^{‡} Sales+streaming figures based on certification alone.

== Release history ==
Region	Date	Format	Label	Ref.
Italy	September 14, 2018	Contemporary hit radio	Universal	
United Kingdom	September 14, 2018	Contemporary hit radio	Polydor	
