= Earache My Eye =

Single by Cheech and Chong

from the album Cheech & Chong's Wedding Album
- B-side: "Turn That Thing Down"
- Released: July 1974
- Genre: Comedy rock, hard rock
- Length: 5:21
- Label: Ode Records; Warner Bros.; Rhino Records
- Songwriters: Tommy Chong; Gaye Delorme; Richard Marin
- Producer: Lou Adler

Cheech and Chong singles chronology
"Sister Mary Elephant" (1973)	"Earache My Eye" (1974)	"Black Lassie (A Great American Dog)" (1974)

"Earache My Eye" is a comedy routine and song by Cheech and Chong from their 1974 album Cheech & Chong's Wedding Album. The skit is about a teenager (played by Tommy Chong) who wakes up and listens to a song by "Alice Bowie" (Cheech Marin), while his father (also played by Marin) yells at him to get ready for school.

The song, unnamed in the skit, was released as a single under the name "Earache My Eye" and gained surprising popularity, reaching the top 10 on the charts in the United States and Canada. It has since been covered by many artists, most notably Eminem, Widespread Panic, Korn, and Soundgarden. The song had its music written by Gaye Delorme and was performed by session musicians including Delorme on guitar and Airto Moreira on drums. It is best known for its guitar riff.

== History ==
The routine first appeared on Cheech & Chong's Wedding Album (1974). It was later included on the greatest hits collections Cheech & Chong's Greatest Hit (1981) and Where There's Smoke There's Cheech & Chong, the latter a double-CD anthology from 2002.

Cheech and Chong lip sync to the recording (with Chong behind the drum kit) in their first movie Up in Smoke (1978). The song has been featured repeatedly on the Dr. Demento radio show, and it is included on the Dr. Demento 20th Anniversary Collection. According to Tommy Chong's autobiography, the famous guitar riff is played by Gaye Delorme, who also composed the music for the song. Additionally, Chong states that drums on the song are played by famed international percussionist Airto Moreira.

The song was released as a single in 1974 and reached #9 on the Billboard charts and #4 in Canada. In Chicago, it topped the charts at the powerful and influential Top 40 radio station WLS (AM), holding the #1 position for one week in September 1974, in the middle of an eleven-week run on the station's top 40 airplay charts. The song also reached the top spot for one week on the West Coast's biggest Top 40 radio station, Los Angeles' KHJ-AM. The B-side, "Turn That Thing Down", features the remainder of the musical track from the point of Marin's monologue about his wealth, without the actual dialogue, complete to its conclusion. It is possible to assemble the full-length version of the song by editing the two sections together. An edited version that fades out before the skit appears on the soundtrack for Up in Smoke and the Greatest Hit compilation.

Once the song hit its peak on the charts, radio station managers and owners, especially the AM stations, pulled the song off the air following multiple complaints. Phone calls and angry letters came from parents, teachers, psychologists, clergy, principals, school administrators, and counselors. Complaints stated that this song mostly appealed to junkies, dropouts, drug addicts, and drunkards as well as students playing hooky from class, giving them a bad model for their behavior. Those who opposed the track threatened to boycott the stations unless the song was permanently withdrawn. "Oldies" station AM 1110 KRLA banned the track, and some radio managers threatened to fire any disc jockey who played it. Sponsors threatened to pull their advertisements unless the song was completely removed from playlists. The AM stations threatened to fire any radio station employees who accepted requests or discussed the track on the air.

== Content ==
"Earache My Eye" consists of a song followed by a comedy skit.

In the skit, Chong plays a rebellious teen. At the beginning of the piece we hear snoring, followed by an alarm clock, and then the boy wakes up noisily. He starts up a glam rock record, with Cheech Marin singing the lyrics as glam rock star character Alice Bowie who, as the name implies, is supposed to be a combination of Alice Cooper and Ziggy Stardust-era David Bowie (at one point in his tune, "Alice Bowie" even mentions having orange hair, which the real David Bowie had sported at that time). The song itself is about a teenager fantasizing about becoming a world-famous rock star, becoming very wealthy and not having to listen to authority as a result, including being disowned for wearing his sister's pantyhose. The teenager states that he did not care if the world came to an end and that he was kicked off the basketball team by the coach for "wearing high-heeled sneakers and acting like a queen."

As the song continues into an electric guitar-heavy bridge, the teen's father (Marin) barges into the room and yells, "I said turn that thing down and get ready for school!", and scratches the record, which annoys the boy. The father then tells his son to get his "fanny perpendicular" and get ready for school. The son then complains about an earache, prompting the dad to exclaim, "Earache my eye, how would you like a butt-ache?" The boy then gets even snottier, provoking his father to swat him with a belt. When he ridicules the spanking as painless, the father then whips him into sniveling, outward compliance, which lasts until his father leaves the room, after which the teen puts the record back on.

During the latter part of the record ("Turn That Thing Down") – essentially, an extended, electric rock guitar-driven coda, beginning from Alice Bowie's rant about being wealthy (albeit without the lyrics) – the father can be heard knocking on the door several times demanding that his son "turn that thing down and get ready for school".

== Charts ==
Chart (1974)	Peak position
Australia (Kent Music Report)	26
Canada (RPM)	4
U.S. Billboard Hot 100	9

== Influence ==
The musical portion of "Earache My Eye" was written originally by Canadian artist Gaye Delorme, a resident of Edmonton, AB. The song has been covered by many bands, ranging in styles from heavy metal to hip hop. The comedy-metal group Scatterbrain covered the song on their album Here Comes Trouble.

Korn released the song as a hidden track at the end of "My Gift to You" from their 1998 album Follow the Leader, with Cheech Marin appearing as a guest vocalist. The recording was reissued on the compilations Live and Rare and Playlist: The Very Best of Korn, separated from "My Gift to You".

Rollins Band and Soundgarden both covered the song, and the hip-hop group 2 Live Crew used a sample from the song on their 1989 album As Nasty As They Wanna Be for the song "Dirty Nursery Rhymes". The Canadian power trio Rush have used the song's signature riff live, to end "The Big Money", (whose album version ends with a fade) on the live album A Show of Hands and the final riff of the same show as depicted in the video of the same name. It was also used to end "Tom Sawyer" on the band's Snakes & Arrows World Tour and can be heard on the subsequent live album.

Electric Magma used the song's main riff in a song titled "The Chong Song" which appears on the 2007 release, Coconut Bangers Ball.

Gov't Mule covered the song at the Vic Theatre in Chicago, Illinois on April 15, 2000, with Brodie Hutchinson, soundman, performing the spoken word portion and this is available as a Classic Muletracks.

The Kottonmouth Kings also sampled this classic on the song "Loadies" from their album Cloud Nine.

Raging Slab also covered the song on their 1991 release, Slabbage / True Death.

A sample of the song was heard in the 1995 film National Lampoon's Senior Trip.

Widespread Panic covered it on Halloween 2014 in Broomfield, Colorado.

Eminem sampled the song on his track "Untouchable", from his album Revival.
