= Revival (Eminem album) =

2017 studio album

Studio album by Eminem
- Released: December 15, 2017
- Recorded: October 2016 – December 2017
- Genres: Hip-hop; rap rock; pop rap; political hip-hop
- Length: 77:47
- Labels: Shady; Goliath; Aftermath; Interscope
- Producers: Eminem; Dr. Dre; Rick Rubin; Aalias; Alex da Kid; DJ Khalil; Emile; Fredwreck; Frequency; Illa da Producer; Hit-Boy; Just Blaze; Luis Resto; Mark Batson; Mr. Porter; Neff-U; Rock Mafia; Scram Jones; Skylar Grey; Trevor Lawrence

Eminem chronology
The Marshall Mathers LP 2 (2013)	Revival (2017)	Kamikaze (2018)

Singles from Revival
- 1. "Walk on Water" Released: November 10, 2017; 2. "River" Released: December 15, 2017; 3. "Nowhere Fast" Released: March 27, 2018; 4. "Remind Me" Released: July 6, 2018 (Italy only)

Revival is the ninth studio album by the American rapper Eminem, released on December 15, 2017, through Shady Records, Goliath Artists, Aftermath Entertainment, and Interscope Records. It was executive-produced by Dr. Dre and Rick Rubin and its producers include Mr. Porter, Emile, Just Blaze, Alex da Kid, Fredwreck, and DJ Khalil. It features appearances from Beyoncé, Ed Sheeran, Alicia Keys, X Ambassadors, Skylar Grey, Kehlani, Pink and Phresher. It was handled by Rubin, Mr. Porter, Emile, Just Blaze, Alex da Kid, Fredwreck, and DJ Khalil.

Eminem revealed that he was working on an album following the release of "Campaign Speech" in October 2016. Much of Revival features political discussion, as well as discussion of Eminem's personal life. The album's lead single, "Walk on Water", which features Beyoncé, was released on November 10, 2017. "Untouchable" was released as a promotional single a week prior to the album's release. Further singles included "River", featuring Ed Sheeran, "Nowhere Fast", featuring Kehlani, and "Remind Me".

Reception to Revival was generally mixed, with its lack of cohesion, abundance of rock-influenced and sampled production, the heavy presence of pop guest artists, and mixing all receiving varying degrees of response; it has later been deemed by many to be Eminem's worst album. It debuted at number one in several countries, including the US, where it has been certified platinum. It was the UK Christmas number one album of 2017 and has been certified platinum in the UK. It was followed by Kamikaze (2018), Eminem's tenth studio album, in which he reacts to criticism of Revival.

== Background ==
Eminem first revealed that he was working on an album when he announced the song "Campaign Speech" on his Twitter in October 2016, writing, "Don't worry I'm working on an album! Here's something meanwhile." Rumors about the release date started in late 2016, saying the album would be called Success and would be released sometime in January 2017. A fake tracklist also was leaked at the same time, with Adele, Chance the Rapper, Kid Cudi, Vince Staples, The Weeknd and Mástein Bennett as featured artists. Rumors were sparked again in February and March 2017, when Eminem announced he was headlining three shows in Reading, Glasgow and Leeds. Various news articles said that because he was performing, he would have to release new material to perform, or at least preview, at the festivals.

On October 10, 2017, Eminem performed a freestyle titled "The Storm" at the 2017 BET Hip Hop Awards, criticizing President Donald Trump. The freestyle went viral, garnering millions of views and hundreds of thousands of likes on YouTube within weeks. (Note: As of August 20, 2018, the video had over 47 million views and over 1.2 million likes.)

On October 25, 2017, Paul Rosenberg posted a photo to Instagram of Yelawolf's Trial by Fire. In the background of the photo, there is a billboard ad promoting a drug called "Revival". Suspicion was aroused when fans noticed that the 'E' in "Revival" was reversed, similar to Eminem's previous logos. Visiting the website listed on the billboard ad revealed several clues. On the website, a promotional video about Revival makes references to Eminem's song "Lose Yourself". The website also references "Sing for the Moment", "Brain Damage", "Fack", "Role Model", and "Any Man". According to the website, "Revival" treats "Atrox Rithimus", a nonexistent medical condition. One translation of Atrox Rithimus, from Latin, is 'terrible rhyme'. The website is also registered to one of Eminem's labels, Interscope Records. When the phone number for "Revival" is called, it plays the background music of Dr. Dre's "I Need a Doctor", which Eminem features on. These details led fans to believe Eminem's new album will be called Revival. This would follow suit with the names of two of his last three solo albums, Relapse (2009) and Recovery (2010).

== Release ==
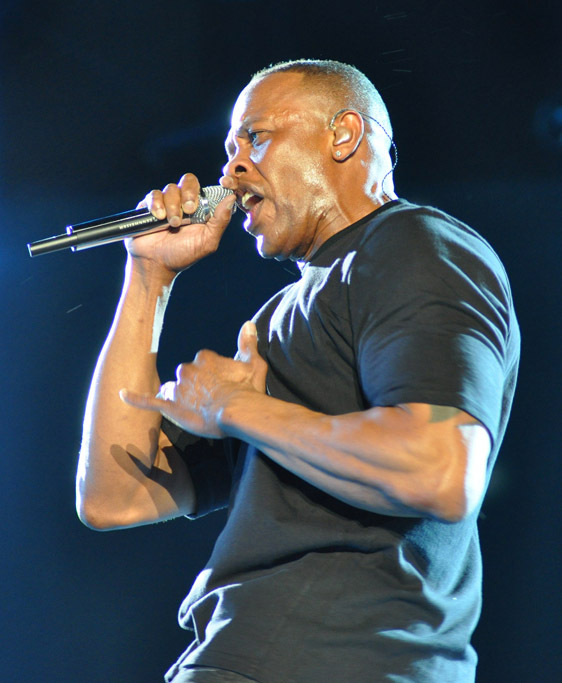
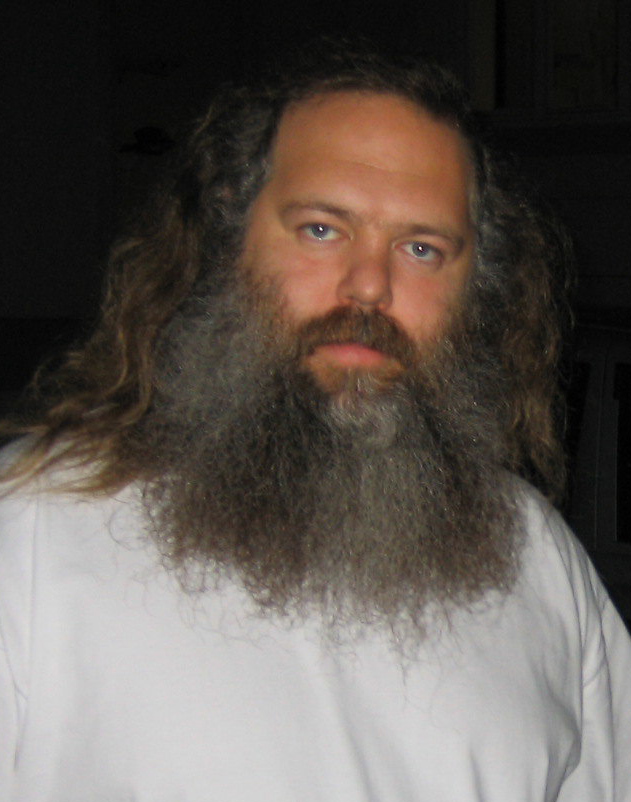
Dr. Dre (left) and Rick Rubin (right) served as the album's executive producers.

The lead single, "Walk on Water", was first performed by Eminem at the 2017 MTV Europe Music Awards on November 12, 2017, with co-producer and writer Skylar Grey on vocals. Both performed the song and a medley of "Stan" / "Love the Way You Lie" on Saturday Night Live on November 18.

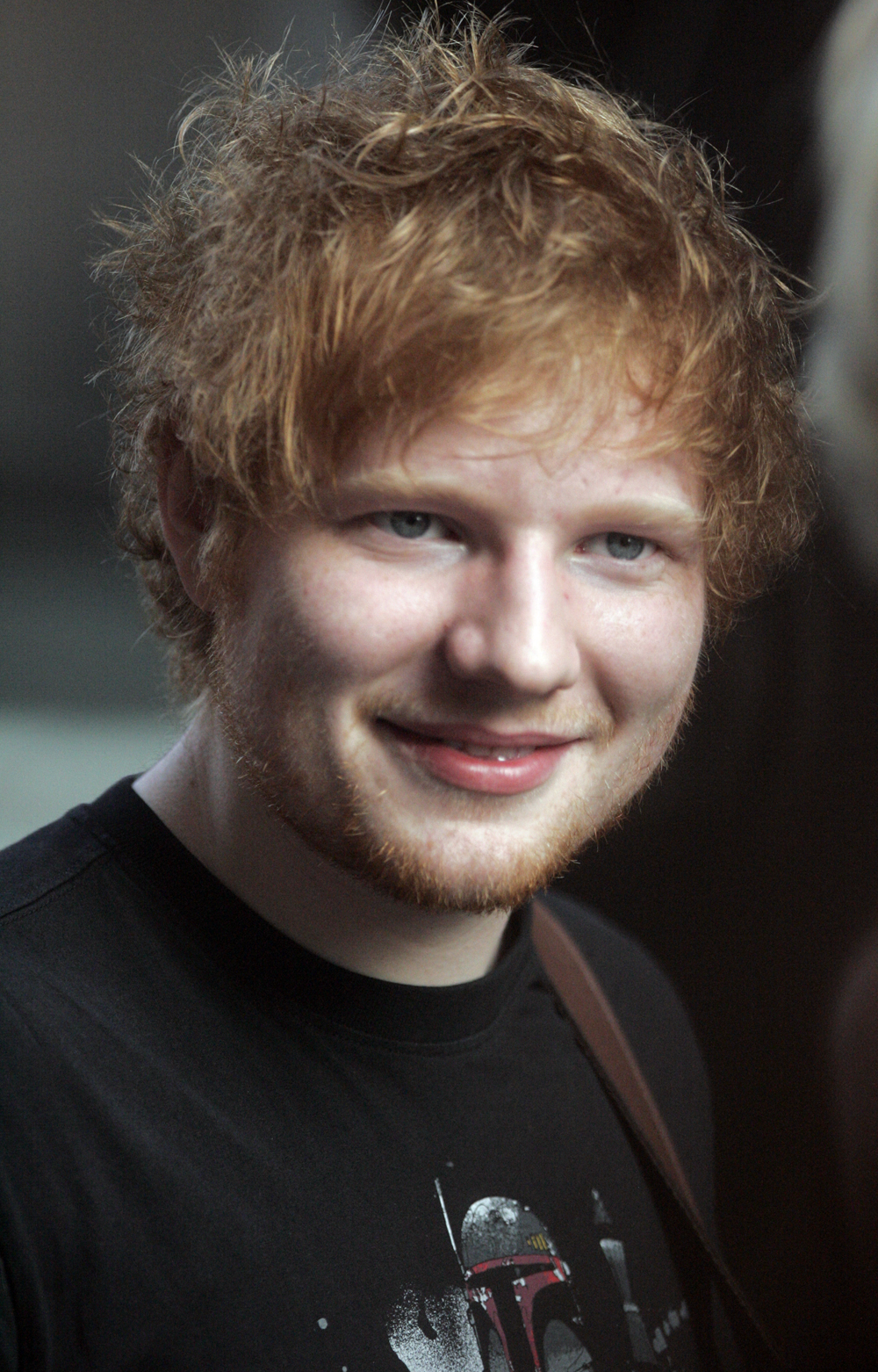
Ed Sheeran is featured on the track "River".

The release date was teased multiple times. On November 28, 2017, the release date was announced to be December 15 via Dr. Dre's and Eminem's social media accounts, while also revealing the fake drug campaign of the record. On December 5, Eminem shared a complete list of all the tracks featuring on his album via his Instagram account. The list features a total of 19 tracks, including an interlude track to Revival, featuring artists such as Phresher, Ed Sheeran, Skylar Grey, Alicia Keys, X Ambassadors, Pink and Kehlani.

On December 7, 2017, the album cover was revealed and projected onto a Detroit building. That night, the song "Untouchable" was released and a pre-order was set up on iTunes. Billboard's Tatiana Cirisano listed the cover as one of the worst of 2017, dubbing it "provocative but undeniably cringeworthy". On December 13, 2017, two days before the release date, Revival was leaked online.

=== Singles ===
On November 8, 2017, Eminem tweeted a picture of a doctor's prescription note with the words "Walk on Water" and "Take as needed" written on it. Additionally, the doctor's note was labeled with the logo for Revival. This caused speculation that the first single would be titled "Walk on Water". On November 9, Paul Rosenberg shared a video on Instagram linking the drug "Revival" with "Walk on Water" and confirming the song, which was subsequently released the next day. An audio video was uploaded to Eminem's YouTube channel. As of December 16, 2017, the video had nearly 50 million views and over 1.1 million likes. On December 23, 2017, the music video for the song was released exclusively on Apple Music and Eminem's official Vevo channel. "Walk on Water" debuted at number 14 on the Billboard Hot 100, becoming the 57th entry for both artists on the chart.

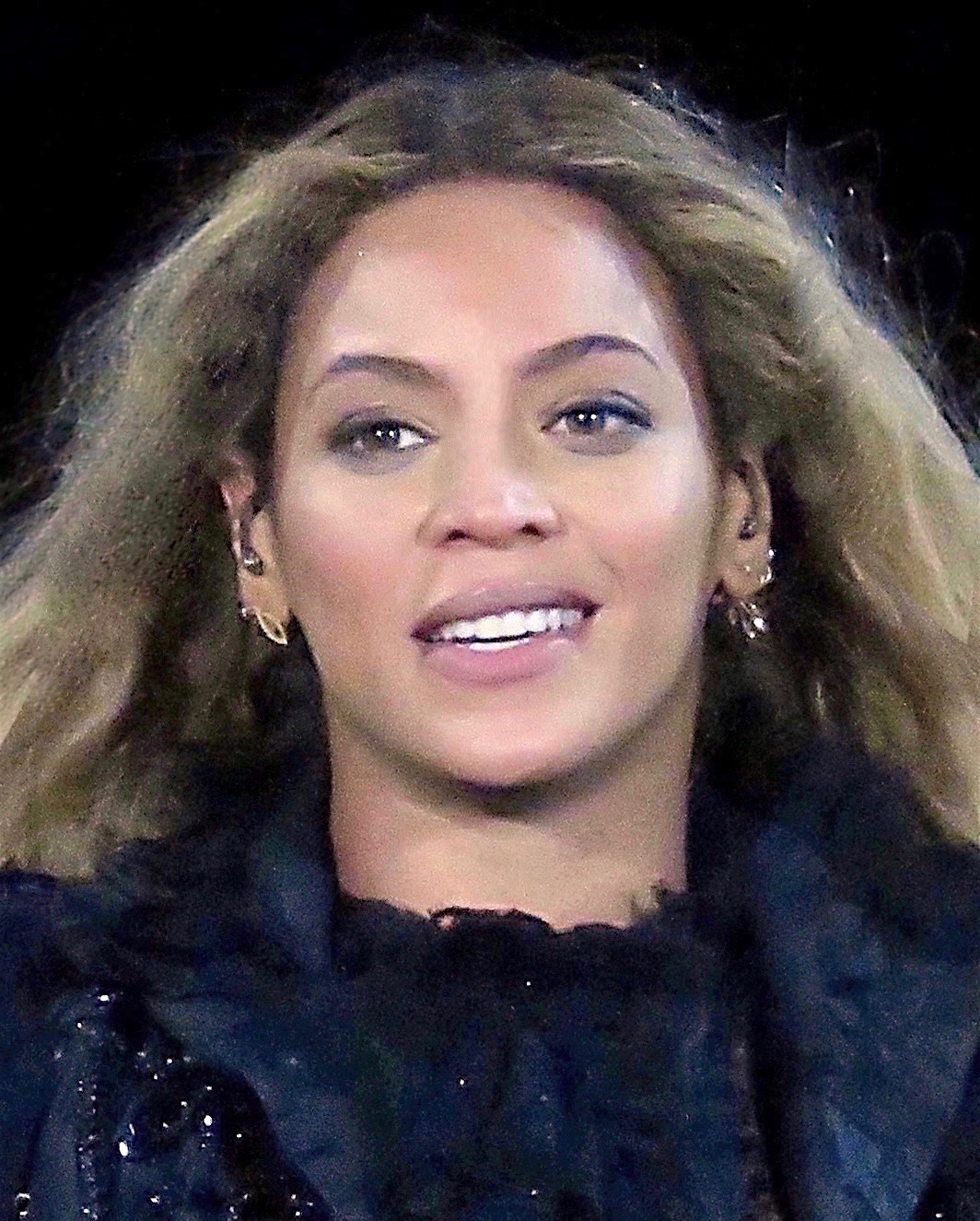
Beyoncé served as the vocalist for the lead single, "Walk on Water".

"River", featuring Ed Sheeran, was released as a second single. The song was released to radio on January 5, 2018, and was released a single on February 7. An audio video was uploaded to Eminem's YouTube channel on December 14, 2017. As of January 15, 2018, the video has over 60 million views and 1 million likes. On February 14, 2018, the music video for the song was released on Eminem's official Vevo channel. Commercially, it has reached number one in the United Kingdom, Norway, and Sweden as well as the top 10 in Australia, Austria, Canada, Denmark, Finland, Germany, Hungary, Ireland, Italy, the Netherlands, New Zealand, Portugal, and Switzerland, and the top 20 in Belgium and the United States.

The album's third single, "Nowhere Fast" featuring Kehlani, impacted US Contemporary hit radio on March 27, 2018. The two artists performed the song at the 2018 iHeartRadio Music Awards. "Remind Me" was released to Italian radio as the fourth single on July 6, 2018. A music video for "Framed", inspired by 1980s horror films, was released on April 3.

=== Promotional singles ===
"Untouchable" was released as a promotional single on December 8, 2017. The song features a sample from the song "Earache My Eye" by comedy duo Cheech & Chong. A remix of "Chloraseptic" featuring 2 Chainz and Phresher was released as a promotional single on January 8, 2018.

== Content ==
According to Eminem, the title is "kind of a double entendre. It's a revival for myself and (that's) the theme of the album. But there's also hopefully the revival of America." Revival has many lines critiquing Donald Trump's presidential campaign and election. On "Like Home", he raps his regret over having collaborated with Trump on a mock national convention in which Trump endorses his Slim Shady persona. (Note: "... wish I would have spit on it before I went to shake his hand at the event.") Such criticisms are contrasted by lyrics such as those on "Like Home" celebrating the sanctity of U.S. civil liberties and calling for a "brand new America" without Trump. On "Heat", Eminem jokes that he agrees with the then-president about one thing—grabbing women by the "pussy".

On "Untouchable", Eminem addresses racism in America, including police brutality, blaming it on Republicans and criticizing the philosophy of 'pull yourself up by the bootstraps', retorting, "where the fuck are the boots?" "Nowhere Fast" deals with gun violence in the U.S., with an extended version naming the National Rifle Association of America as being largely responsible.

Two joke-laden tracks focus on newfound romance and related sexual escapades: "Remind Me", which samples Joan Jett & the Blackhearts' "I Love Rock 'n' Roll", and "Heat", which samples clips from the film Boogie Nights (1997). "Framed" borrows elements of horror films.

The last three songs, "In Your Head", "Castle", and "Arose" deal with the rapper's personal life. The first of these, sampling The Cranberries' "Zombie", expresses regret regarding some of his early lyrics related to his Slim Shady persona. "Castle" is structured as a series of letters to his daughter, Hailie Mathers, climaxing in a series of events in 2007 which led to him overdosing, also expressing a struggle with fame which made him consider quitting rap. Continuing the theme, in "Arose", Eminem pens thoughts to his family from the perspective of his near-death experience. Finding his strength to continue living, he rewinds to near the end of the previous track, where he considers quitting the industry, then continues in a new direction to his sobriety and the success of his more recent work, with high hopes for the current album.

== Critical reception ==
Professional ratings
Aggregate scores
Source	Rating
AnyDecentMusic?	4.3/10
Metacritic	50/100
Review scores
Source	Rating
AllMusic	3/5 stars
The A.V. Club	D+
Consequence of Sound	F
The Daily Telegraph	4/5 stars
The Guardian	2/5 stars
The Independent	4/5 stars
NME	3/5 stars
The Observer	2/5 stars
Pitchfork	5.0/10
Rolling Stone	3.5/5 stars

Revival generally received mixed reviews from music critics. According to the review aggregator Metacritic, Revival received "mixed or average reviews" based on a weighted average score of 50 out of 100 from 24 critic scores.

Don Needham of The Guardian criticized the production and focus, stating that "If Eminem thinks his verbal box of tricks can overcome the weakness of any backing track, his recent albums get demonstrated otherwise." In a positive review, Andy Gill of The Independent complimented the lyrical themes: "But ultimately, it's all about Eminem himself, and nowhere more dynamically than in the berserk self-assessment "Offended", where he asserts, amongst other things, that if the time he spent writing were taken into account, he'd be a minimum-wage slave – a faintly ludicrous claim, but immediately backed up by a bravura extended burst of rapid-rap babble that both explains and exemplifies his skills, and leaves one wondering not just how long it took to write, but how on earth he manages to pronounce such a polysyllabic torrent so perfectly." Neil McCormick of The Daily Telegraph stated that Revival "represents Eminem on top form, which is to say unstoppable, unbeatable yet often indefensible."

The Irish Times concluded that Revival is "mildly more admirable than previous outings but no more enjoyable. A chance to bust out of the slump has passed Eminem by. It just might never happen for him." In a mixed review, Jon Caramanica of The New York Times remarked that while it was "probably the best of his recent albums", he criticized Eminem's apparent lack of awareness to the evolution of hip-hop's sound in general, arguing that he is too "beholden to his own aesthetic." Consequence of Sound gave Revival an "F" rating, calling it "ugly, arthritic, and pleasureless" and "a disaster".

Comparing Revival to Eminem's previous bodies of work, Matthew Ismael Ruiz of Pitchfork stated that "Musically, Revival is no different, chock full of piano ballads and pop-star features that echo the most cynically commercial corners of his catalog. The shock value comes not from the album's overwhelmingly bland hooks or cringe-worthy humor (of which there is plenty), but from the moments where his growth as a human is most apparent", concluding that "Revival is another late-career album that does little for his legacy." Writing for Vice, Robert Christgau found it "much cleverer than lemmings claim, bluntly and intelligently political too, but so received in its cartoon misogyny and pop grandeur you know he felt irrelevance bearing down even before #MeToo killed this album on the vine". He named "Untouchable", "Chloraseptic", and "Like Home" as highlights.

Trent Clark from HipHopDX said that "Eminem's dedication to wrecking mics like Robert Mueller can never be questioned but the production choices still remain an enigma. When he doesn't bathe in lamely visible rock samples like Joan Jett and the Blackhearts' "I Love Rock 'n' Roll" or The Cranberries' "Zombie" (on "Remind Me" or "In Your Head" respectively), he's mostly square pegging his intensified lyrics on mechanical slabs of assembly line pop hybrids." He singled out "Framed" and "Castle" as highlights:

it's largely the retreads of past glory where he hits his stride the hardest. On the hypnotically-produced "Framed," Marshall dons the hockey mask for old times sake and pulls up off homicidal fantasies that for better or worse, feature the album's most in-pocket rhyme moment. And when he plunges into his drug-altered psyche to speak on his greatest love — his daughter Haile Jade — the ever-reliable DJ Khalil steps up to the plate on "Castle" with a darkened soundbed of macabre guitars and deathly drum marches that feature the album's most vintage Eminem moment.

Mitch Findlay from HotNewHipHop wrote: "Revival is, by far, Eminem's most pop-friendly album to date. While previous albums merely flirted with the sound, Revival has bought a ring and proposed to it. Therefore, if you're somebody who finds no pleasure in the production of 'pop-rap,' you'll find no solace here." He singled out "Framed," "Castle" and "Arose" as highlights, with the latter two being "among Revival's strongest tracks. Conceptually and lyrically, the closing pair find Eminem in excellent form, and longtime fans will no doubt cite these two as album highlights."

Retrospectively, in a 2024 ranking of Eminem's 12 studio albums, Damien Scott of Billboard magazine placed Revival last, writing that "Revival finds Eminem creatively unmoored and culturally adrift". Although Scott stated that "[Eminem's] rapping remains technically impressive", he concluded that "the album fails to move past what feel like empty gripes from an artist who, by all accounts, should be proud of the career he's had".

== Commercial performance ==
Revival is Eminem's eighth consecutive album to top the US Billboard 200, debuting with 267,000 album-equivalent units, 197,000 being traditional album sales. As a result, Eminem became the first musical act to get eight entries in a row debut at its summit.

Revival entered atop the UK Albums Chart with 132,000 album-equivalent units, becoming the year's second largest opening behind Ed Sheeran's ÷ and giving the rapper his eighth consecutive number-one album. As of October 2018, it sold 321,000 album-equivalent units in the UK.

It additionally arrived at number one in Australia, becoming his ninth entry to top the ARIA Albums Chart. The album then fell behind ÷ the following week. In 2018, Revival was ranked the 32nd-most popular album of the year on the Billboard 200.

== Legacy ==
Eminem said of the reaction to Revival: "I think there's things to be taken away from this album and the reaction to it. Were there too many songs? Were there too many features? There were certain songs like 'Tragic Endings' and 'Need Me' where I felt like lyrically they would give the listener a second to breathe. I spend a lot of time writing shit that I think nobody ever gets." Later he said: "When the Revival tracklist came down the pipe, it was like overwhelmingly, 'This shit is going to be trash.' Nobody really wanted to be wrong about it. I'm not saying everybody, but a lot of people had already formed their opinion." He said: "I'm good with Revival. Fuck it. Because I couldn't have made [Kamikaze] without it."

On the Kamikaze opener "The Ringer", Eminem criticizes detractors of Revival (Note: "Maybe the vocals should have been Auto-Tuned; and you would have bought it. But sayin' I no longer got it; 'cause you missed the line and never caught it; cause it went over your head, because you're too stupid to get it ...") and expresses empathy for fans alienated by his anti-Trump remarks, describes Trump as an "evil serpent" (Note: "If I could go back, I'd at least reword it; and say I empathize with the people this evil serpent sold the dream to that he's deserted."), and claims that he was questioned by the U.S. Secret Service regarding lyrics that were perceived as threatening toward the president. Following the claim, BuzzFeed filed a Freedom of Information Act request with the Secret Service to determine if the interview occurred. In October 2019, the agency revealed to BuzzFeed that, in response to an email from a TMZ employee pressing the agency to investigate Eminem for his "threatening lyrics" about Donald and Ivanka Trump, they had conducted a background check and arranged an interview, in which the interviewers read the verse out loud to Eminem—and he rapped along. The agency decided against referring the case to a federal prosecutor.

Revival is widely considered Eminem's worst and most polarizing album by fans and critics. The CD case for Revival appears in the music videos for two songs from Kamikaze: "Fall" and "Venom".

== Track listing ==
Credits adapted from Tidal.

Revival track listing
No.	Title	Writer(s)	Producer(s)	Length
1.	"Walk on Water" (featuring Beyoncé)	Marshall Mathers; Holly Hafermann; Beyoncé Knowles	Rick Rubin; Skylar Grey^{[a]}	5:03
2.	"Believe"	Mathers; Luis Resto; Mark Batson; Mike Strange	Eminem; Luis Resto^{[b]}; Mr. Porter^{[b]}	5:15
3.	"Chloraseptic" (featuring Phresher)	Mathers; Denaun Porter; Erick Sermon; Parrish Smith	Mr. Porter	5:01
4.	"Untouchable"	Mathers; Emile Haynie; Mark Batson; Porter; Tommy Chong; Gaye Delorme; Richard Marin; Duval Clear; Andre Brown; Tyrone Kelsie; Eric McIntosh	Eminem; Mark Batson; Emile Haynie; Mr. Porter	6:10
5.	"River" (featuring Ed Sheeran)	Mathers; Emile Haynie; Ed Sheeran	Emile Haynie	3:41
6.	"Remind Me (Intro)"	Andre Young; Theron Feemster; Trevor Lawrence, Jr.	Dr. Dre; Feemster; Lawrence, Jr.	0:26
7.	"Remind Me"	Mathers; Jake Richards; Allan Sachs; Jesse Bonds Weaver, Jr.; Matt Dike; Luther Rabb; James Walters; Marvin Young	Rick Rubin	3:45
8.	"Revival (Interlude)"	Mathers; Alicia Lemke; Bryan Frizel; Aaron Kleinstub; Regina Spektor	Frequency; Aalias	0:51
9.	"Like Home" (featuring Alicia Keys)	Mathers; Myles Moraites; Hafermann; A. Jackson; Justin Smith; Paul Rosenberg; Resto; Alicia Augello-Cook	Just Blaze; Eminem^{[a]}	4:05
10.	"Bad Husband" (featuring X Ambassadors)	Mathers; Alexander Grant; Resto; Sam Harris	Alex da Kid; Eminem^{[a]}	4:47
11.	"Tragic Endings" (featuring Skylar Grey)	Mathers; Hafermann; Grant	Alex da Kid	4:12
12.	"Framed"	Mathers; Farid Nassar; David John Byron; Kenneth William Hensley	Fredwreck; Eminem^{[a]}	4:12
13.	"Nowhere Fast" (featuring Kehlani)	Mathers; Mark Batson; Antonina Armato; Timothy James Price; Thomas Armato Sturges	Rock Mafia; Hit-Boy	4:24
14.	"Heat"	Mathers; Darryl McDaniels; Joseph Simmons; Larry Smith; Adam Horovitz; Rubin	Rick Rubin	4:10
15.	"Offended"	Mathers; Ray Fraser; Charles Bradley; Thomas Brenneck; David Guy; Leon Michels	Illa da Producer; Eminem^{[a]}	5:20
16.	"Need Me" (featuring P!nk)	Mathers; Hafermann; Jon Ingoldsby; Grant	Alex da Kid	4:25
17.	"In Your Head"	Mathers; Dolores O'Riordan; Marc Shemer	Scram Jones	3:02
18.	"Castle"	Mathers; Khalil Abdul-Rahman; Pranam Injeti; Erik Alcock; Liz Rodrigues	DJ Khalil	4:14
19.	"Arose"	Mathers; Barry White; Amanda McBroom	Rick Rubin	4:34
Total length:				77:47

Track notes

- ^{^[a]} signifies a co-producer.
- ^{^[b]} signifies an additional producer.
- "Remind Me" features backing vocals by Mr. Porter.
- "Revival (Interlude)" features vocals by Alice and the Glass Lake.
- "Offended" features vocals by Kent Jones.
- "Castle" features vocals by Liz Rodrigues.

Sample credits

- "Chloraseptic" contains elements of "It's My Thing", written by Erick Sermon and Parrish Smith and performed by EPMD.
- "Untouchable" contains samples of "Earache My Eye", written by Tommy Chong, Gaye Delorme, Richard Marin and performed by Cheech & Chong, and "Born to Roll", written by Duval Clear, Andre Brown, Tyrone Kelsie and Eric McIntosh and performed by Masta Ace Incorporated.
- "Remind Me" contains samples of "I Love Rock 'n' Roll", written by Alan Merrill, Jake Hooker and performed by Joan Jett and the Blackhearts; "Saturday Night", written and performed by Schoolly D and "Bust a Move", written by Matt Dike, Luther Rabb, James Walters and Marvin Young and performed by Young MC.
- "Revival (Interlude)" contains elements of "Human of the Year", written and performed by Regina Spektor.
- "Framed" contains samples of "Pilgrim", written by David John Byron and Kenneth William Hensley and performed by C&K Vocal.
- "Heat" contains samples of "King of Rock", written by Darryl McDaniels, Joseph Simmons and Larry Smith and performed by Run-DMC, "Girls", written by Adam Horovitz and Rick Rubin and performed by the Beastie Boys and an uncredited sample of "Intro (Feel the Heat)" from the film Boogie Nights and performed by John C. Reilly and Mark Wahlberg.
- "Offended" contains samples of "In You (I Found a Love)", written by Charles Bradley, Thomas Brenneck, David Guy and Leon Michels and performed by Charles Bradley.
- "In Your Head" contains samples of "Zombie", written by Dolores O'Riordan and performed by The Cranberries.
- "Arose" contains samples of "I'm Gonna Love You Just a Little More Baby", written and performed by Barry White and "The Rose", written by Amanda McBroom and performed by Bette Midler.

== Personnel ==
Credits adapted from the album's liner notes.

Performers

- Eminem – vocals
- Beyoncé – vocals (track 1)
- Phresher – vocals (track 3)
- Ed Sheeran – vocals (track 5)
- Alicia Keys – vocals (track 9)
- X Ambassadors – vocals (track 10)
- Skylar Grey – vocals (track 11)
- Kehlani – vocals (track 13)
- Pink – vocals (track 16)

Technical

- Mike Strange – recording engineer (tracks 1–5, 7, 9–19), mixing engineer (tracks 2–5, 8, 9, 12, 13, 15, 17–19)
- Joe Strange – recording engineer (tracks 1–5, 7, 9–19)
- Jason Lader – recording engineer (tracks 1, 14, 19)
- Stuart White – recording engineer (track 1)
- Rob Bisel – assistant recording engineer (tracks 1, 7, 14, 19)
- Johnnie Burik – assistant recording engineer (tracks 1, 7, 14, 19)
- Tony Campana – assistant recording engineer (tracks 1–5, 7, 9–19)
- Manny Marroquin – mixing engineer (tracks 1, 11, 16)
- Eminem – mixing engineer (tracks 5, 9)
- Mauricio "Veto" Iragorri – recording engineer (track 6)
- Robert Reyes – assistant recording engineer (track 6)
- Charles "CharlieRed" Garcia – assistant recording engineer (track 6)
- Dr. Dre – mixing engineer (tracks 6, 7, 14)
- Quentin "Q" Gilkey – mixing engineer (tracks 6, 7, 14)
- Frequency – recording engineer (track 8)
- Aalias – recording engineer (track 8)
- Just Blaze – recording engineer (track 9)
- Andrew Wright – recording engineer (track 9)
- Ann Mincieli – recording engineer (track 9)
- Brendan Morawski – assistant recording engineer (track 9)
- Travis Ference – recording engineer (tracks 10, 11, 16)
- Sam Harris – recording engineer (track 10)
- Chris Galland – mixing engineer (tracks 10, 11, 16)
- Robin Florent – assistant mixing engineer (tracks 10, 11, 16)
- Scott Desmarais – assistant mixing engineer (tracks 10, 11, 16)
- Steve Hammons – recording engineer (track 13)
- Adam Comstock – recording engineer (track 13)
- Darwin Sanchez – recording engineer (track 15)
- Scram Jones – recording engineer (track 17)
- Myles William – percussion, programming (track 9)

Production

- Rick Rubin – producer (tracks 1, 7, 14, 19)
- Skylar Grey – producer (track 1)
- Eminem – producer (tracks 2, 4), co-producer (tracks 9, 10, 12, 15)
- Luis Resto – additional producer (track 2)
- Mr. Porter – additional producer (track 2), producer (tracks 3, 4)
- Mark Batson – producer (track 4)
- Emile Haynie – producer (tracks 4, 5)
- Dr. Dre – producer (track 6)
- Neff-U – producer (track 6)
- Trevor Lawrence – producer (track 6)
- Frequency – producer (track 8)
- Aalias – producer (track 8)
- Just Blaze – producer (track 9)
- Alex da Kid – producer (track 10 11 16)
- Fredwreck – producer (track 12)
- Rock Mafia – producer (track 13)
- Hit-Boy – producer (track 13)
- Illa da Producer – producer (track 15)
- Scram Jones – producer (track 17)
- DJ Khalil – producer (track 18)

== Charts ==
=== Weekly charts ===
Chart (2017–2018)	Peak position
Australian Albums (ARIA)	1
Austrian Albums (Ö3 Austria)	2
Belgian Albums (Ultratop Flanders)	6
Belgian Albums (Ultratop Wallonia)	20
Canadian Albums (Billboard)	1
Croatian International Albums (HDU)	32
Czech Albums (ČNS IFPI)	15
Danish Albums (Hitlisten)	2
Dutch Albums (Album Top 100)	1
Finnish Albums (Suomen virallinen lista)	1
French Albums (SNEP)	7
German Albums (Offizielle Top 100)	2
German Albums (Top 20 Hip Hop)	1
Greek Albums (IFPI)	12
Hungarian Albums (MAHASZ)	14
Irish Albums (IRMA)	3
Italian Albums (FIMI)	7
Japanese Albums (Oricon)	17
Latvian Albums (LaIPA)	1
New Zealand Albums (RMNZ)	3
Norwegian Albums (VG-lista)	1
Polish Albums (ZPAV)	17
Portuguese Albums (AFP)	9
Scottish Albums (Official Charts)	2
Slovak Albums (IFPI)	24
Spanish Albums (Promusicae)	18
Swedish Albums (Sverigetopplistan)	2
Swiss Albums (Schweizer Hitparade)	1
UK Albums (Official Charts)	1
US Billboard 200	1
US Top R&B/Hip-Hop Albums (Billboard)	1

=== Year-end charts ===
Chart (2017)	Position
Australian Albums (ARIA)	21
French Albums (SNEP)	118
German Albums (Offizielle Top 100)	67
Italian Albums (FIMI)	97
UK Albums (OCC)	20

Chart (2018)	Position
Australian Albums (ARIA)	31
Austrian Albums (Ö3 Austria)	71
Belgian Albums (Ultratop Flanders)	52
Belgian Albums (Ultratop Wallonia)	122
Canadian Albums (Billboard)	5
Danish Albums (Hitlisten)	13
Dutch Albums (Album Top 100)	63
French Albums (SNEP)	113
German Albums (Offizielle Top 100)	59
Icelandic Albums (Plötutíóindi)	78
Italian Albums (FIMI)	77
New Zealand Albums (RMNZ)	34
Swedish Albums (Sverigetopplistan)	25
Swiss Albums (Schweizer Hitparade)	6
UK Albums (OCC)	32
US Billboard 200	32
US Top R&B/Hip-Hop Albums (Billboard)	21

== Certifications and sales ==
Region	Certification	Certified units/sales
Australia (ARIA)	Platinum	70,000^{‡}
Austria (IFPI Austria)	Gold	7,500^{‡}
Canada (Music Canada)	Platinum	80,000^{‡}
China	—	357,343
Denmark (IFPI Danmark)	Platinum	20,000^{‡}
France (SNEP)	Platinum	100,000^{‡}
Germany (BVMI)	Gold	100,000^{‡}
Italy (FIMI)	Gold	25,000^{‡}
New Zealand (RMNZ)	2× Platinum	30,000^{‡}
Norway (IFPI Norway)	Platinum	20,000^{‡}
Poland (ZPAV)	Gold	10,000^{‡}
United Kingdom (BPI)	Platinum	321,000
United States (RIAA)	Platinum	1,000,000^{‡}
^{‡} Sales+streaming figures based on certification alone.
