= Stan (song) =

2000 single by Eminem

Single by Eminem

from the album The Marshall Mathers LP
- Released: November 20, 2000
- Recorded: September 1999–February 2000
- Studio: 54 Sound (Detroit, MI); Encore (Burbank, CA); Larrabee Sound (North Hollywood, CA); The Mix Room (Burbank, CA); Chung King (New York, NY); Record Plant (Los Angeles, CA)
- Genre: Horrorcore
- Length: 6:44 (album version); 5:31 (radio edit)
- Label: Aftermath; Interscope; Web
- Songwriters: Marshall Mathers; Dido Armstrong; Paul Herman
- Producers: The 45 King; Rollo; Eminem

Eminem singles chronology
"The Way I Am" (2000)	"Stan" (2000)	"The Watcher" (2001)

Audio sample
- "Stan": file; help

Music videos
- "Stan" (Long Version) on YouTube; "Stan" (Short Version) on YouTube

"Stan" is a song by American rapper Eminem, with vocals sampled from the opening lines of English singer Dido's song "Thank You". It was released on November 20, 2000, as the third single from Eminem's third album, The Marshall Mathers LP (2000). "Stan" peaked at number 51 on the Billboard Hot 100. Outside of the United States, "Stan" topped the charts in twelve countries, including the United Kingdom, Germany, Australia, and Ireland.

"Stan" has been called one of Eminem's best songs, and is considered one of his signature songs alongside "The Real Slim Shady" and "Lose Yourself". It chronicles an unstable man's obsession with his favorite rapper, through a series of letters. The song has appeared on Rolling Stone's list of The 500 Greatest Songs of All Time, VH1's list of the greatest hip-hop songs of all time, and the Rock and Roll Hall of Fame's 500 Songs that Shaped Rock and Roll. Both the song and its accompanying music video were nominated for multiple awards, including Best Song at the MTV Europe Music Awards, Video of the Year, Best Rap Video, Best Direction, and Best Cinematography at the MTV Video Music Awards. It won Best International Artist Video at the MuchMusic Video Awards.

The eponymous character's name gave rise to a slang term referring to overzealous or obsessive fans of a celebrity or personality; the term has since been included in the Oxford English Dictionary.

== Background and recording ==
The 45 King was first inspired to develop a production sampling "Thank You" whilst watching the 1998 film Sliding Doors, in which the song is featured, at his home. Upon hearing the song, he immediately switched the film off, went into his studio and looped a sample of "Thank You" as well as adding a bassline. He sent the production to his contacts at Interscope Records, through whom it would eventually find its way to Eminem after his manager Paul Rosenberg sent him a tape of the 45 King's production work. When listening to the 45 King's loop, the lyric "But your picture on my wall / It reminds me that it's not so bad, it's not so bad" immediately resonated with Eminem, who felt it would be perfectly suited to a song about an obsessed fan. Since the release of his previous album The Slim Shady LP (1999), Eminem had received many disturbing letters from fans who appeared to have taken the album's violent content seriously, which encouraged him to write a song addressing these fans directly in the form of a fictionalized cautionary tale.

When I heard "your picture on my wall," I was like "Yo, this could be about somebody who takes me too seriously." So I knew what I was going to write about before I wrote it. A lot of times when I'm writing songs, I see visions for everything I'm writing. This was one of those.

— Eminem, describing the origins of "Stan" to Genius in 2016

The third verse of the song had to be entirely re-recorded after the engineer, with whom Eminem had never worked before, accidentally taped over the original take against Eminem's wishes. Eminem asked to re-record the final three lines, but the engineer – who Eminem claims was smoking cannabis during the session – mistakenly rewound the 2-inch recording tape right back to the start and began recording again. Eminem immediately realized the error and unsuccessfully tried to alert the engineer, but the take was completely written over. When revealing this anecdote to music website Genius in 2016, Eminem stated that, in his opinion, the original take was "significantly better" than the re-recorded one, expressing his disappointment that it would never be heard. While Richard “Segel” Huredia was the engineer for Stan (and most of the rest of the album), it is not clear what engineer Eminem was referring to that recorded over his third verse.

== Composition and lyrics ==
The song tells the story of a person named Stanley "Stan" Mitchell (voiced by Eminem) who claims to be Eminem's biggest fan. It has been suggested the name "Stan" is a portmanteau of the words "stalker" and "fan", though his manager later revealed that the portmanteau was a “happy coincidence. The term "stan" has since become an internet slang term for an extremely obsessed fan of something or someone and is derived from the song's title. Speaking to The Independent in 2025, Eminem's longtime manager, Paul Rosenberg, said that the "stalker" and "fan" portmanteau was a "happy coincidence" and that Eminem simply chose the name because it rhymed with "fan".

In the song, Stan writes Eminem several letters; over two verses, he is shown to be obsessive over the rapper, and grows increasingly frustrated and angry when there is no reply. He finally creates a voice recording of himself while driving his car on the highway, having consumed large quantities of depressants and alcohol; this verse includes a call-back to Eminem's "My Name Is" with the lyrics "I drank a fifth of vodka, you dare me to drive?", as well as a reference to the urban legend surrounding "In the Air Tonight" by Phil Collins (referred to in the song as "In the Air of the Night") with the lyric "about that guy who coulda saved that other guy from drownin', but didn't..."). He reveals that his pregnant girlfriend is tied up in the trunk as he approaches a bridge, realizing in a panic that he has no way to send the tape to Eminem, but it is too late. The verse ends at the sound of his car swerving off the bridge and hitting the water below.

The fourth verse features Eminem as himself, writing back to Stan and attempting to reason with him. Eminem tries to explain to Stan that while he does appreciate having him as a fan and is incredibly grateful, he worries that Stan might not always be taking the lyrics of his songs in the right way. In an example of dramatic irony, Eminem also urges Stan to receive help for his mental health issues and to treat his girlfriend better, lest he end up like a man he just saw on the news who had driven his car off a bridge in a drunken stupor, killing himself and his pregnant girlfriend. Eminem then realizes halfway through writing his letter that the man he saw on the news was in fact Stan.

== Music video ==
Directed by Dr. Dre and Philip Atwell, the video is a literal interpretation of the story. The video features Devon Sawa as Stan and Dido as his pregnant girlfriend. According to Sawa, he got the part because Dr. Dre was a fan of Final Destination, which Sawa starred in. He also stated that Macaulay Culkin was the first choice of the role.

The video starts with a prologue that involved Stan dyeing his hair blonde and reacting angrily to being called "Stanley" by his girlfriend. Later, he sits in a basement full of Eminem's posters, writing letters that express his devotion as "[Eminem's] biggest fan". He is aware of every development in Eminem's personal life. Stan gets angry at his girlfriend when she interrupts him watching Eminem's "The Way I Am" video.

Stan wants Eminem to contact him through a personal letter or a phone call; but, due to unfortunate circumstances, Eminem fails to respond in a timely manner. Believing he has been ignored, Stan uses a tape recorder to record himself driving along a rain-soaked highway while his girlfriend is locked up in the trunk, which he does with the intention of driving off a bridge. In the process, Stan references both "My Name Is" ("I drank a fifth of vodka, dare me to drive?") and an urban legend about Phil Collins' "In the Air Tonight", before realizing that there is no way of transmitting this final tape to Eminem. The car then breaks through the bridge barrier, sealing both occupants' fates.

Stan's mother and his little brother Matthew visit his grave. When Matthew opens his hoodie, he has dyed his hair blonde like Stan. Eminem finally gets around to responding to Stan. He apologizes for being late, thanks him for being a fan, and expresses interest in Stan's personal life. Eminem worries about Stan's mental state and says he does not want Stan to end up like a story he had seen on the news recently — a man who had driven drunk off a bridge with his girlfriend in the trunk, about whom he then realizes, "It was you. Damn." Unbeknownst to Eminem, flashes of lightning shine on his window, revealing the ghost of Stan silently glaring, smiling after he sees Eminem finally writing the letter he wanted for so long. The video ends with Matthew staring at Stan's grave.

== Censorship ==
In the MTV "clean" version, the song and video were censored. Significant portions from the first two verses and most of the third verse were removed. MTV also cut out all references of Stan's girlfriend bound in the trunk of the car and removed one scene showing him guzzling vodka while driving. In the MTV full version, which is 8:15 long, the third verse censors Stan mentioning his girlfriend in the trunk (so "Shut up bitch" and "screaming in the trunk" is censored), and about him not slitting her throat, but tied her up, and "if she suffocates, she'll suffer more, then she'll die too", which "slit", "tied her up", "suffocates", and "die" is censored.

Dido has stated that she was gagged in the third verse of the video; however, this was censored so widely that versions with her gagged are rare. In the uncensored version, Stan is shown drinking at the wheel of the car before showing Dido struggling in the trunk of the car. She manages to remove the duct tape from her mouth and screams before struggling for breath. Most versions were censored so that there is only a brief clip of Dido in the trunk of the car towards the end of the verse. It also censors when Stan says he "drank a fifth of vodka", which censors "drank" and "vodka"; and censors when he says he is on "a thousand downers", with "downers" censored; and also censors Stan drinking while driving. At the end of the third verse, "Well, gotta go, I'm almost at the bridge now" is changed to "Well, gotta go, I'm almost at the end of the bridge now". In the fourth verse, the line "[And what's this] shit about us meant to be together" is completely censored. All references to the girlfriend in the trunk are censored, including the screaming in the background, and the line: "And had his girlfriend in his trunk, and she was pregnant with his kid."

In the MTV short version, which was used for radio airplay due to time constraints, the second verse lines that are missing are from "I ain't that mad though, I just don't like bein' lied to" to "I even got a tattoo of your name across the chest"; the video cuts showing Stan meeting Eminem, talking about how his father cheated and beat his mother and showed him getting a "Slim Shady" tattoo on his chest. The missing lyrics from the third verse are of Stan talking about drinking while driving and referencing "In the Air Tonight" (Eminem quotes the title as "In the Air of the Night"), which in the video, skips from showing Stan narrowly missing another car and swerving to avoid crashing into it. The lines that are missing are from "Hey Slim, I drank a fifth of vodka, you dare to me to drive?" to "I hope you know I ripped all of your pictures off the wall". It also removes the chorus after the third verse and goes straight to the fourth verse; the video then cuts to Eminem at last receiving the letter from Stan, and the car sinking deeper into the water.

In Fuse's original state as a rock and alternative station, the same versions of the video were shown as on MTV. However, in later Fuse airings, more lines and words are silenced than on the clean version of the LP; half of one of the beginning verses are cut out, and then the song fades out about halfway through the second verse, after playing for approximately two minutes. "Stan" was also released on track 17 (15 on the clean version) of Curtain Call: The Hits; on the clean and explicit versions, the live track censored only the profanity, unlike the clean version of the studio track.

== Critical reception ==
"Stan" was met with critical acclaim, with praise directed to the song's epistolary narrative structure, emotional range and lyrical depth. Stephen Thomas Erlewine highlighted the song. Entertainment Weekly praised the song, too: "Eminem proves himself a peerless rap poet with a profound understanding of the power of language. Stan, an epistolary exchange between the artist and a dangerously obsessive fan, may be the most moving song about star worship ever recorded" and added that "Stan" blazes significant new ground for rap. Entertainment Weekly would later select "Stan" as the best single of the year 2000. The Los Angeles Times was also positive: "'Stan', the album's most haunting track, is superb storytelling with a point. It has the affecting tone of such rap high points as Ice Cube's 'It Was a Good Day' and Tupac's 'Dear Mama'."

NME magazine praised the song: "'Stan' is a wonderful short story, an astute study in extreme fandom." Sputnik Music described that "Stan's sampling of Dido and use of rain and writing sound effects" make the album versatile. The same critic listed the song in the Recommended Downloads list and reviewed it:

If you haven't heard this, you probably make a career out of living under rocks. It tells the story of an obsessive fan who kills themselves because their idol (Eminem) never writes back, and introduces one of the album's key themes – the scary power of fame. Ironic, then, that this album made him the biggest cultural figurehead on the planet. It starts with a sample of Dido's 'Thank You' under a sample of rain. This sample goes on to form the song's hook, relating the level of Stan's obsession and almost making him a sympathetic character (Your picture on my wall/It reminds me that it's not so bad....). Offsetting this is Eminem's raps under the persona of Stan, which reveal him as a reprehensible character; mentally unstable, self-mutilating, sexually confused, volatile, and abusive to his pregnant girlfriend (whose life he takes too, when he takes his own). Eminem's final verse is him attempting to write back, asking him not to be like this guy he saw on the news....Overplayed? Yes. But even so, of all of Eminem's singles, this one demonstrates his power as a rapper and his skill as a poet best.

IGN praised the song as "easily the most scathingly introspective rumination on fan adoration, idol assimilation, and borderline stalker etiquette. Teamed to Dido's lulling 'Thank You' with its almost somnambulistically hypnotic pop sultriness provides a jolting contrast to the twisted storyline of a musical obsession gone awry. It also paints a picture of what it's like to be knee deep in the push-and-pull world of a superstar. The song's poignancy never fades, even almost five years later it's still potent." Slant Magazine was mixed: "'Stan' is an interesting look into the mind of a fanatic (albeit through the eyes of an equally disturbed individual), but it's structured entirely around someone else's work (Dido's 'Thank You')."

== Commercial performance ==
"Stan" barely missed the top-50 of the US Billboard Hot 100, one of the few main national charts in the world factoring in airplay in addition to sales. It almost only reached the bottom of the top-40 on the magazine's R&B/Hip-Hop chart, peaking at number 36. Radio play was the primary driver of its run on the charts, having comparable peak positions to airplay charts for the Hot 100 (#48) and R&B/Hip-Hop (#31) while never making any sales component chart. Additionally, it was almost a top-ten hit on the airplay component chart for the rap chart, stalling at number 11, while missing the main chart. Internationally, "Stan" topped the single sales charts of the entire continent of Europe and eleven individual countries, including Australia, Austria, Denmark, Finland, Germany, Iceland, Ireland, Italy, Scotland, Switzerland, and the UK Singles Chart. It was the first epistolary number one in Britain since 1966. Additionally, it was number-one on the Romanian Top 100, consisting entirely of airplay.

== Legacy ==
=== Retrospective critical reception ===
"Stan" is one of Eminem's most acclaimed songs and has been called a "cultural milestone", referred to as "Eminem's best song" by About.com. Analyzing "Stan" in The Guardian, writer and literary critic Giles Foden compared Eminem to Robert Browning.

"Stan" has been listed by many as one of the greatest rap songs of all time. It was ranked number three on a list of the greatest rap songs in history by Q magazine and came tenth in a similar survey conducted by Top40-Charts.com. Rolling Stone magazine's list of the "500 Greatest Songs of All Time" ranked it number 290, one of Eminem's two songs on the list along with "Lose Yourself"; in the updated 2010 list, it was ranked at number 296. It ranked number 45 on About.com's "Top 100 Rap Songs".

The song ranked number 15 on VH1's "100 Greatest Songs of Hip Hop", and number two on their "Countdown Millennium Songs". It was also named the "46th Best Song of the Decade" by Complex magazine, and the 10th Best Song of the decade by Rolling Stone. The song was ranked at number 58 in Rolling Stone's list of "100 Greatest Hip-Hop songs of all time". In 2017, Rolling Stone ranked the song number two on their list of the 50 greatest Eminem songs, and in 2020, The Guardian ranked the song number one on their list of the 30 greatest Eminem songs.

=== Stan culture ===
"Stan" has entered the lexicon as a term for an overly obsessed fan of someone or something and is used colloquially to express fandom of all kinds. The term is especially popular in the rap community; in "Ether", a diss track against rapper Jay-Z, Nas notably called Jay a "stan" of both himself and The Notorious B.I.G. The term was added to the Oxford English Dictionary in 2017 and the Merriam-Webster Dictionary in 2019. In 2024, a new documentary on the phenomenon of stan culture, Stans, directed by Steven Leckart and produced by Eminem was announced; it was released in August 2025.

Eminem Superfans are very commonly referred as Stans.

=== Other rappers' songs ===
Rapper Canibus released a response track to "Stan" titled "U Didn't Care" in which Canibus, imitating Stan, accused Eminem of not caring about him. Christian rap artist KJ-52 recorded two songs: "Dear Slim" and "Dear Slim, Part II", which attempted to contact Eminem in an allusion to "Stan". Eminem later referenced a fan who had written a letter saying he was praying for him in "Careful What You Wish For". "My Life" by The Game samples "Stan". Conservative rapper Tom MacDonald recorded a response track to Stan in 2021. After Eminem released a series of NFTs as part of his "Shady Con" event with Nifty Gateway, MacDonald purchased one—an Eminem-produced instrumental called "Stan's Revenge"—for $100,000. MacDonald used the instrumental to create his song "Dear Slim", released in May 2021. The song's accompanying music video paid homage to the music video for "Stan".

"Stan" has influenced many other hip-hop songs, including Tyler, the Creator's 2013 song "Colossus", from his album Wolf. This track dwells on similar themes as "Stan", such as growing up without a father, feeling like an outsider, and deep emotional attachment to a rapper.

=== Later Eminem songs ===
Eminem has referenced "Stan" in some of his later songs, including "River", "Walk on Water", "The Ringer", "Killshot", and his verse on "Calm Down" by Busta Rhymes.

Eminem's song "Bad Guy", the opening track on The Marshall Mathers LP 2, is a sequel to "Stan". The song is Matthew tracking down Eminem in an attempt to kill him, which he succeeds in doing so. After he dies in the song, Eminem is sent to hell in the song as a punishment for Stan's death.

=== Parodies ===
In 2020, Saturday Night Live featured a Christmas parody of "Stan" called "Stu", featuring Pete Davidson as Stu writing to Santa and becoming increasingly angry when he does not answer his requests for a PlayStation 5, with a cameo appearance from Eminem himself, who does receive the system for Christmas. Unlike the final verse in the actual song, Santa, sensing Stu's rising instability, blows off Stu in his reply, claiming he had the wrong address the whole time. The skit also features cast members Kate McKinnon as Dido and Bowen Yang as Elton John, as well as guest host Jason Bateman as Santa Claus.

== Live performances ==
At the 2001 Grammy Awards, when he was facing criticism from GLAAD over his lyrics, Eminem responded by performing "Stan" with singer-songwriter Elton John singing Dido's lines. Many of the profanities were substituted, for example, "You're like his favorite idol" in place of "You're like his fucking idol", and "stuff" for "shit". Recordings of this performance were available for download on Eminem's official website Eminem.com and, later, on his 2005 greatest hits album Curtain Call: The Hits.

In 2022 at Eminem's Rock and Roll Hall of Fame induction ceremony performance, he performed the song with Ed Sheeran, who played guitar during the song and sang Dido's lines.

== Awards and nominations ==
Year	Ceremony	Award	Result
2001	BET Awards	Video of the Year	Nominated
2001	MTV Europe Music Awards	Best Song	Nominated
2001	MTV Video Music Awards	Video of the Year	Nominated
2001	MTV Video Music Awards	Best Male Video	Nominated
2001	MTV Video Music Awards	Best Rap Video	Nominated
2001	MTV Video Music Awards	Best Direction in a Video	Nominated
2001	MTV Video Music Awards	Best Cinematography in a Video	Nominated

== Track listing ==
No.	Title	Writer(s)	Producer(s)	Length
1.	"Stan" (radio edit)	Marshall Mathers; Dido Armstrong; Paul Herman	The 45 King; Eminem^{[a]}	5:33
2.	"Guilty Conscience" (radio version with gunshot)	Mathers; Andre Young	Dr. Dre; Eminem^{[a]}	3:21
3.	"Hazardous Youth" (acapella version)	Mathers		0:46
4.	"Get You Mad" (Sway & King Tech featuring DJ Revolution with Eminem)	Mathers	DJ King Tech	4:22
Total length:				14:02

Notes

- ^{^[a]} signifies a co-producer.

== Credits ==
- Singing and lyrics: Eminem, Dido
- Production: Eminem, The 45 King
- Mixing: Eminem
- Guitar and bass: Mike Elizondo
- Keyboard: Mike Elizondo, Tommy Coster
- Composer: Marshall Mathers, Dido Armstrong, The 45 King
- Executive producer: Dr. Dre
- Producer video: Chris Palladino
- Cinematographer: Dariusz Wolski
- Directors: Philip G. Atwell & Dr. Dre
- Appearances in the clip: Devon Sawa as Stan, Dido as Stan's girlfriend, Dakota as Matthew, Nathan Mathers, Eminem

== Charts ==
=== Weekly charts ===
Chart (2000–2001)	Peak position
Australia (ARIA)	1
Australian Urban (ARIA)	1
Austria (Ö3 Austria Top 40)	1
Belgium (Ultratop 50 Flanders)	3
Belgium (Ultratop 50 Wallonia)	2
Brazil (ABPD)	87
Canada (Nielsen SoundScan)	27
Canada Radio (Nielsen BDS)	34
Croatia (HRT)	6
Denmark (Tracklisten)	1
Europe (European Hot 100)	1
Finland (Suomen virallinen lista)	1
France (SNEP)	4
Germany (GfK)	1
Iceland (Íslenski Listinn Topp 40)	1
Ireland (IRMA)	1
Italy (FIMI)	1
Netherlands (Dutch Top 40)	2
Netherlands (Single Top 100)	3
New Zealand (Recorded Music NZ)	14
Norway (VG-lista)	3
Poland Airplay (Music & Media)	9
Poland (Polish Airplay Charts)	21
Portugal (AFP)	3
Romania (Romanian Top 100)	1
Scottish Singles Sales (Official Charts)	1
Spain (Promusicae)	3
Sweden (Sverigetopplistan)	3
Switzerland (Schweizer Hitparade)	1
UK Singles (Official Charts)	1
UK Hip Hop/R&B (Official Charts)	1
US Billboard Hot 100	51
US Hot R&B/Hip-Hop Songs (Billboard)	36
US Pop Airplay (Billboard)	33
US Rhythmic Airplay (Billboard)	9

Chart (2022)	Peak position
Global 200 (Billboard)	150

=== Year-end charts ===
Chart (2000)	Position
France (SNEP)	29
Sweden (Sverigetopplistan)	49
UK Singles (Official Charts Company)	6

Chart (2001)	Position
Australia (ARIA)	6
Australian Urban (ARIA)	3
Austria (Ö3 Austria Top 40)	6
Belgium (Ultratop Flanders)	31
Belgium (Ultratop Wallonia)	20
Canada (Nielsen SoundScan)	136
Europe (Eurochart Hot 100)	1
France (SNEP)	50
Germany (Official German Charts)	18
Ireland (IRMA)	38
Netherlands (Dutch Top 40)	80
Netherlands (Single Top 100)	55
Romania (Romanian Top 100)	28
Sweden (Sverigetopplistan)	55
Switzerland (Schweizer Hitparade)	3
UK Singles (Official Charts Company)	74

=== Decade-end charts ===
Chart (2000–09)	Position
Australia (ARIA)	94
Germany (Official German Charts)	79
UK Singles (Official Charts Company)	21

== Certifications ==
Region	Certification	Certified units/sales
Australia (ARIA)	9× Platinum	630,000^{‡}
Austria (IFPI Austria)	Gold	25,000^{*}
Belgium (BRMA)	Platinum	50,000^{*}
Brazil (Pro-Música Brasil)	Gold	30,000^{‡}
Denmark (IFPI Danmark)	Platinum	90,000^{‡}
France (SNEP)	Platinum	500,000^{*}
Germany (BVMI)	3× Gold	750,000^{‡}
Italy (FIMI) sales since 2009	Platinum	100,000^{‡}
Netherlands (NVPI)	Gold	40,000^{^}
New Zealand (RMNZ)	5× Platinum	150,000^{‡}
Portugal (AFP)	Gold	20,000^{‡}
Spain (Promusicae)	Gold	30,000^{‡}
Switzerland (IFPI Switzerland)	Gold	25,000^{^}
United Kingdom (BPI)	5× Platinum	3,000,000
United States (RIAA)	4× Platinum	4,000,000^{‡}
^{*} Sales figures based on certification alone.^{^} Shipments figures based on certification alone.^{‡} Sales+streaming figures based on certification alone.

== See also ==
- List of best-selling singles
- List of European number-one hits of 2000
- List of number-one singles of 2000 (Ireland)
- List of number-one hits of 2000 (Switzerland)
- List of UK Singles Chart number ones of the 2000s
- List of Austrian number-one hits of 2001
- List of number-one singles in Australia in 2001
- List of number-one hits in Denmark
- List of number-one hits of 2001 (Germany)
- List of number-one hits of 2001 (Italy)
- List of Romanian Top 100 number ones of the 2000s
- Parasocial relationship
- "Bad Guy" (Eminem song)
- "Mi Bebito Fiu Fiu", a parody song
