= Nowhere Fast (Eminem song) =

- Extended version cover

Single by Eminem featuring Kehlani

from the album Revival
- Released: March 27, 2018
- Length: 4:38
- Label: Aftermath; Shady; Interscope
- Songwriters: Marshall Mathers; Timothy Price; Mark Batson; Thomas Armato Sturges; Antonina Armato
- Producers: Hit-Boy; Rock Mafia

Eminem singles chronology
"River" (2017)	"Nowhere Fast" (2018)	"Caterpillar" (2018)

Kehlani singles chronology
"Playinwitme" (2018)	"Nowhere Fast" (2018)	"What I Need" (2018)

"Nowhere Fast" is a song recorded by American rapper Eminem featuring guest vocals from American singer Kehlani. It was written by Eminem, Mark Batson, Thomas Armato Sturges, and Tim James and Antonina Armato of Rock Mafia, who produced it with Hit-Boy. The song was sent to radio on March 27, 2018, as the third single from Eminem's ninth studio album, Revival (2017). An extended version was released ten days earlier on March 17, 2018.

== Live performances ==
On March 11, 2018, the artists performed the song's extended version live at the 2018 iHeartRadio Music Awards. The performance centers around the theme of gun violence, featuring a new verse by Eminem at the beginning, which was inspired by the aftermath of the Stoneman Douglas High School shooting. Alex Moscou, a survivor of the shooting, introduced the performance with a speech: "We're tired of hearing politicians send their thoughts and prayers to us, and doing nothing to make the necessary changes to prevent this tragedy from happening again. If those elected to represent won't do what's right to keep us safe, we're going to be too loud for them to ignore."

== Track listing ==
Digital download – extended version
No.	Title	Length
1.	"Nowhere Fast" (featuring Kehlani) (extended version)	4:38

CD single
No.	Title	Length
1.	"Nowhere Fast" (featuring Kehlani) (extended version)	4:38
2.	"Nowhere Fast" (featuring Kehlani)	4:26

== Credits and personnel ==
Credits adapted from Tidal.

- Eminem – vocals
- Kehlani – vocals
- Rock Mafia – production
- Hit-Boy – production

== Charts ==
Chart (2017–18)	Peak position
Australia (ARIA)	76
Canada Hot 100 (Billboard)	81
Germany (GfK)	98
Ireland (IRMA)	59
Sweden (Sverigetopplistan)	96
US Bubbling Under Hot R&B/Hip-Hop Songs (Billboard)	9

== Certifications ==
Certifications for "Nowhere Fast"
Region	Certification	Certified units/sales
Australia (ARIA)	Gold	35,000^{‡}
New Zealand (RMNZ)	Gold	15,000^{‡}
^{‡} Sales+streaming figures based on certification alone.

== Release history ==
Region	Date	Format	Version	Label	Ref.
Various	March 17, 2018	Digital download	Extended	Aftermath; Shady; Interscope	
United States	March 27, 2018	Contemporary hit radio	Extended	Shady; Interscope	
United States	March 27, 2018	Rhythmic contemporary radio	Extended	Shady; Interscope	
Germany	July 6, 2018	CD single	—N/a	Aftermath; Shady; Interscope	
