= The Ringer (song) =

Song by Eminem

from the album Kamikaze
- Released: August 31, 2018
- Recorded: 2018
- Genre: Hip hop
- Length: 5:37
- Label: Shady; Aftermath; Interscope
- Songwriters: Marshall Mathers; Luis Resto; Ray Fraser; Ronald Spence, Jr.
- Producers: Illa da Producer; Ronny J; Eminem

"The Ringer" is a song by American rapper Eminem from his album Kamikaze (2018). The album's opener, it was not released as a single but debuted in the top 10 in Australia, Canada, Finland, Ireland, New Zealand, Norway, Portugal, Sweden, Switzerland, the UK, and the US.

== Contents ==
In the song, Eminem attacks the contemporary hip hop scene, mainly artists who perform mumble rap. Rappers that he calls out on the track include Lil Yachty, Lil Pump, Lil Xan, Machine Gun Kelly, Vince Staples, NF, and Iggy Azalea. He also attacks the critics who gave his previous album, Revival, negative reviews. Finally, he sends shots at U.S. president Donald Trump, similar to the presidential critiques on Revival, calling Trump "Agent Orange" and referencing Eminem's freestyle rap "The Storm" from the 2017 BET Awards.

== Secret Service interview ==
On the song, Eminem references the U.S. Secret Service visiting him in response to lyrics on Revival perceived to be threatening towards Trump. BuzzFeed filed a Freedom of Information Act request with the Secret Service to find out if this was true. In October 2019, the agency revealed to BuzzFeed that, in response to an email from a TMZ employee pressing the Secret Service to investigate Eminem for his "threatening lyrics" about Ivanka Trump (on "Framed"), they had conducted a background check and arranged an interview, in which the interviewers read the verse out loud to Eminem—and he rapped along. The agency subsequently decided against referring the case to a federal prosecutor.

== Personnel ==
- Eminem – lead vocals, production
- Illa da Producer – production
- Luis Resto – keyboards
- Ronny J – production

== Charts ==
Chart (2018)	Peak position
Australia (ARIA)	5
Austria (Ö3 Austria Top 40)	14
Canada Hot 100 (Billboard)	5
Czech Republic Singles Digital (ČNS IFPI)	4
Denmark (Tracklisten)	10
Finland (Suomen virallinen lista)	8
France (SNEP)	36
Germany (GfK)	21
Greece Digital International Singles (IFPI)	3
Hungary (Stream Top 40)	4
Ireland (IRMA)	6
Italy (FIMI)	19
Netherlands (Single Top 100)	16
New Zealand (Recorded Music NZ)	2
Norway (VG-lista)	5
Portugal (AFP)	5
Slovakia Singles Digital (ČNS IFPI)	3
Sweden (Sverigetopplistan)	8
Switzerland (Schweizer Hitparade)	3
UK Singles (OCC)	4
US Billboard Hot 100	8
US Hot R&B/Hip-Hop Songs (Billboard)	7

== Certifications ==
Region	Certification	Certified units/sales
Australia (ARIA)	Platinum	70,000^{‡}
Brazil (Pro-Música Brasil)	Gold	20,000^{‡}
Canada (Music Canada)	Platinum	80,000^{‡}
New Zealand (RMNZ)	Gold	15,000^{‡}
Portugal (AFP)	Gold	5,000^{‡}
United Kingdom (BPI)	Gold	400,000^{‡}
United States (RIAA)	Platinum	1,000,000^{‡}
^{‡} Sales+streaming figures based on certification alone.
