= River (Eminem song) =

Single by Eminem featuring Ed Sheeran

from the album Revival
- Released: December 15, 2017
- Recorded: 2016–2017
- Genre: Pop rap; rap rock; conscious hip-hop; pop rock
- Length: 3:41
- Label: Aftermath; Shady; Interscope
- Songwriters: Marshall Mathers; Ed Sheeran; Emile Haynie
- Producer: Emile Haynie

Eminem singles chronology
| "Walk on Water" (2017) | "River" (2017) | "Nowhere Fast" (2018) |

Ed Sheeran singles chronology
| ""Perfect Duet" version" (2017) | "River" (2017) | ""Perfect Symphony" version" (2017) |

Music video
- "River" on YouTube

"River" is a song by American rapper Eminem featuring English singer-songwriter Ed Sheeran. It is the fifth track from his ninth solo studio album Revival (2017). The song was written by the artists alongside producer Emile Haynie. "River" was released to radio on December 15, 2017 (alongside the rest of the album) in Italy, and in the UK on January 5, 2018, as the album's second single. The music video received a nomination for Best Cinematography at the 2018 MTV Video Music Awards. "River" details the struggles of a failing relationship that culminates in an abortion.

== Release and promotion ==
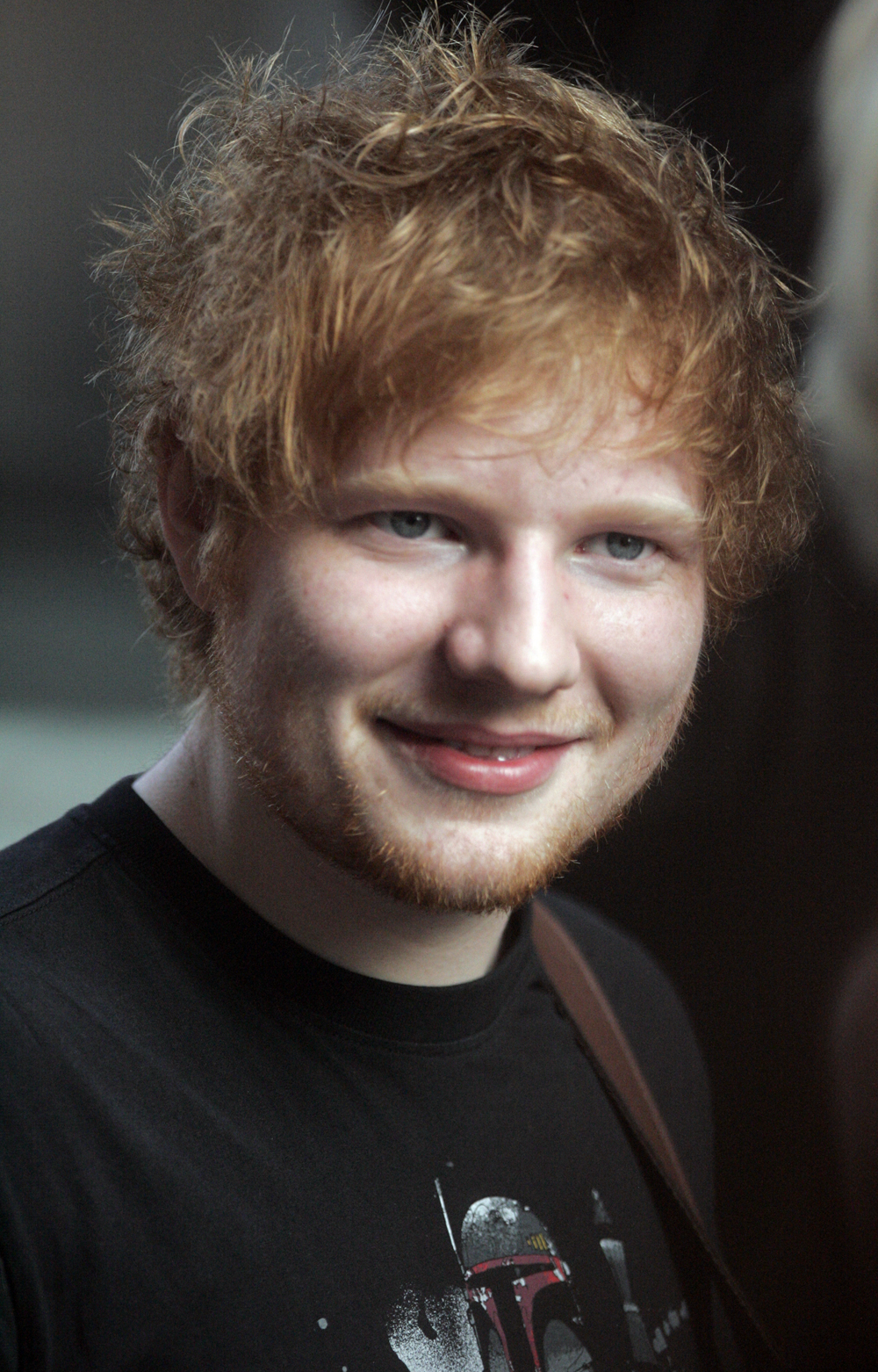
Ed Sheeran served as the featured vocalist on the song.

The song was released on the radio on January 5, 2018. An audio video was uploaded to Eminem's YouTube channel on December 15, 2017. As of 2025, As of February, 2026, the official video has over 208 million views and the audio video has over 224 million views.

== Reception ==
Spin magazine panned it, saying that it's "a song whose perfection of form is matched only by its emptiness of content. It could be beautiful."

== Commercial performance ==
Commercially, it reached number one in the United Kingdom, making it Eminem's ninth number one there and Sheeran's fifth. It also reached number one in Austria, Norway, Scotland and Sweden as well as the top 10 in Australia, Canada, Denmark, Finland, Germany, Hungary, Ireland, Italy, Lebanon, the Netherlands, New Zealand, Portugal, Switzerland, and the top 20 in Belgium and the United States.

== Music video ==
A music video for the song was released on February 14, 2018. It was directed by Emil Nava. The video garnered over 5 million views in the first 24 hours of its release. As of October 2022, the video has been viewed over 188 million times and has accumulated over 2.6 million likes. The music video received a nomination for Best Cinematography at the 2018 MTV Video Music Awards.

In their review of the video, Fuse described some of the scenes as "tense and serious", further stating that a "dark-haired Eminem plays the role so well and raps rhymes about making a woman give up her baby so convincingly, it's not entirely clear what's true and what's made up."

== Composition ==
The song runs for 3 minutes and 41 seconds and is in the key of G♯ minor, the chord progression for the intro is G♯m-B-E-F♯.

== Live performances ==
Eminem and Ed Sheeran performed the song live together for the first (and to date, only) time on the final night of Eminem's Revival Tour at Twickenham Stadium on July 15, 2018.

== Awards and nominations ==
| Year | Ceremony | Award | Result |
|---|---|---|---|
| 2018 | MTV Video Music Awards | Best Cinematography (with Ed Sheeran) | Nominated |

== Charts ==
=== Weekly charts ===
| Chart (2017–2018) | Peak position |
|---|---|
| Argentina Anglo (Monitor Latino) | 18 |
| Australia (ARIA) | 2 |
| Austria (Ö3 Austria Top 40) | 1 |
| Belgium (Ultratop 50 Flanders) | 12 |
| Belgium (Ultratop 50 Wallonia) | 3 |
| Canada Hot 100 (Billboard) | 3 |
| Canada CHR/Top 40 (Billboard) | 23 |
| CIS Airplay (TopHit) | 179 |
| Colombia (National-Report) | 82 |
| Croatia International Airplay (Top lista) | 6 |
| Czech Republic Airplay (ČNS IFPI) | 5 |
| Czech Republic Singles Digital (ČNS IFPI) | 4 |
| Denmark (Tracklisten) | 3 |
| Euro Digital Songs (Billboard) | 2 |
| Finland (Suomen virallinen lista) | 2 |
| France (SNEP) | 26 |
| Germany (GfK) | 2 |
| Greece International (IFPI) | 6 |
| Hungary (Single Top 40) | 8 |
| Hungary (Stream Top 40) | 4 |
| Ireland (IRMA) | 2 |
| Italy (FIMI) | 8 |
| Latvia (DigiTop100) | 4 |
| Lebanon Airplay (Lebanese Top 20) | 3 |
| Netherlands (Dutch Top 40) | 3 |
| Netherlands (Single Top 100) | 5 |
| New Zealand (Recorded Music NZ) | 3 |
| Norway (VG-lista) | 1 |
| Philippines (BillboardPH Hot 100) | 50 |
| Poland Airplay (ZPAV) | 29 |
| Portugal (AFP) | 5 |
| Scotland Singles (OCC) | 1 |
| Singapore (RIAS) | 13 |
| Slovakia Singles Digital (ČNS IFPI) | 11 |
| Slovenia (SloTop50) | 19 |
| Spain (PROMUSICAE) | 57 |
| Sweden (Sverigetopplistan) | 1 |
| Switzerland (Schweizer Hitparade) | 2 |
| UK Singles (OCC) | 1 |
| US Billboard Hot 100 | 11 |
| US Hot R&B/Hip-Hop Songs (Billboard) | 5 |
| US Pop Airplay (Billboard) | 22 |
| US Rhythmic Airplay (Billboard) | 21 |
| Venezuela English (Record Report) | 27 |

=== Year-end charts ===
| Chart (2018) | Position |
|---|---|
| Australia (ARIA) | 19 |
| Austria (Ö3 Austria Top 40) | 25 |
| Belgium (Ultratop Flanders) | 59 |
| Belgium (Ultratop Wallonia) | 31 |
| Canada (Canadian Hot 100) | 29 |
| Denmark (Tracklisten) | 18 |
| France (SNEP) | 100 |
| Germany (Official German Charts) | 17 |
| Iceland (Plötutíóindi) | 18 |
| Ireland (IRMA) | 36 |
| Netherlands (Dutch Top 40) | 20 |
| Netherlands (Single Top 100) | 72 |
| New Zealand (Recorded Music NZ) | 29 |
| Portugal (AFP) | 70 |
| Sweden (Sverigetopplistan) | 27 |
| Switzerland (Schweizer Hitparade) | 19 |
| UK Singles (Official Charts Company) | 30 |
| US Hot R&B/Hip-Hop Songs (Billboard) | 52 |

== Certifications ==
| Region | Certification | Certified units/sales |
|---|---|---|
| Australia (ARIA) | 7× Platinum | 490,000^{‡} |
| Austria (IFPI Austria) | Platinum | 30,000^{‡} |
| Belgium (BRMA) | Platinum | 20,000^{‡} |
| Brazil (Pro-Música Brasil) | Platinum | 40,000^{‡} |
| Canada (Music Canada) | Platinum | 80,000^{‡} |
| Denmark (IFPI Danmark) | 2× Platinum | 180,000^{‡} |
| France (SNEP) | Platinum | 200,000^{‡} |
| Germany (BVMI) | Gold | 200,000^{‡} |
| Italy (FIMI) | Platinum | 50,000^{‡} |
| New Zealand (RMNZ) | 4× Platinum | 120,000^{‡} |
| Norway (IFPI Norway) | Platinum | 60,000^{‡} |
| Poland (ZPAV) | Platinum | 50,000^{‡} |
| Portugal (AFP) | Gold | |
| Spain (Promusicae) | Gold | 30,000^{‡} |
| Sweden (GLF) | 2× Platinum | 16,000,000^{†} |
| United Kingdom (BPI) | 3× Platinum | 1,800,000^{‡} |
^{‡} Sales+streaming figures based on certification alone.^{†} Streaming-only figures based on certification alone.

== Release history ==
| Country | Date | Format | Label | Ref. |
|---|---|---|---|---|
| Italy | December 15, 2017 | Contemporary hit radio | Universal | |
| United Kingdom | January 5, 2018 | Contemporary hit radio | Polydor | |

== See also ==
- List of number-one urban singles of 2018 (Australia)
- List of number-one hits of 2018 (Austria)
- List of number-one songs in Norway
- List of Scottish number-one singles of 2018
- List of number-one singles of the 2010s (Sweden)
- List of UK Singles Chart number ones of the 2010s
