= Walk on Water (Eminem song) =

2017 single by Eminem

Single by Eminem featuring Beyoncé

from the album Revival
- Released: November 10, 2017
- Studio: Effigy Studios (Detroit); Shangri La Studio (Malibu)
- Genre: Hip-hop; alternative hip-hop
- Length: 5:03
- Label: Aftermath; Shady; Interscope
- Songwriters: Marshall Mathers; Holly Hafermann; Beyoncé Knowles
- Producers: Skylar Grey; Rick Rubin

Eminem singles chronology
"Kings Never Die" (2015)	"Walk on Water" (2017)	"River" (2017)

Beyoncé singles chronology
"Mi Gente" (remix) (2017)	"Walk on Water" (2017)	"Perfect Duet" (2017)

Music video
- "Walk on Water" on YouTube

"Walk on Water"
A 33-second sample of "Walk on Water".

"Walk on Water" is a song by American rapper Eminem featuring vocals by American singer Beyoncé. It was released on November 10, 2017, as the lead single from Eminem's ninth studio album Revival. The song was written by the artists alongside Skylar Grey, who produced it with Rick Rubin. It has reached the top 10 in Australia, Ireland, Scotland, Sweden, Switzerland, and United Kingdom, as well as the top 20 in Austria, France, Germany, Hungary, Lebanon, New Zealand, Norway, and the United States. The music video received a nomination for Best Visual Effects at the 2018 MTV Video Music Awards.

== Production ==
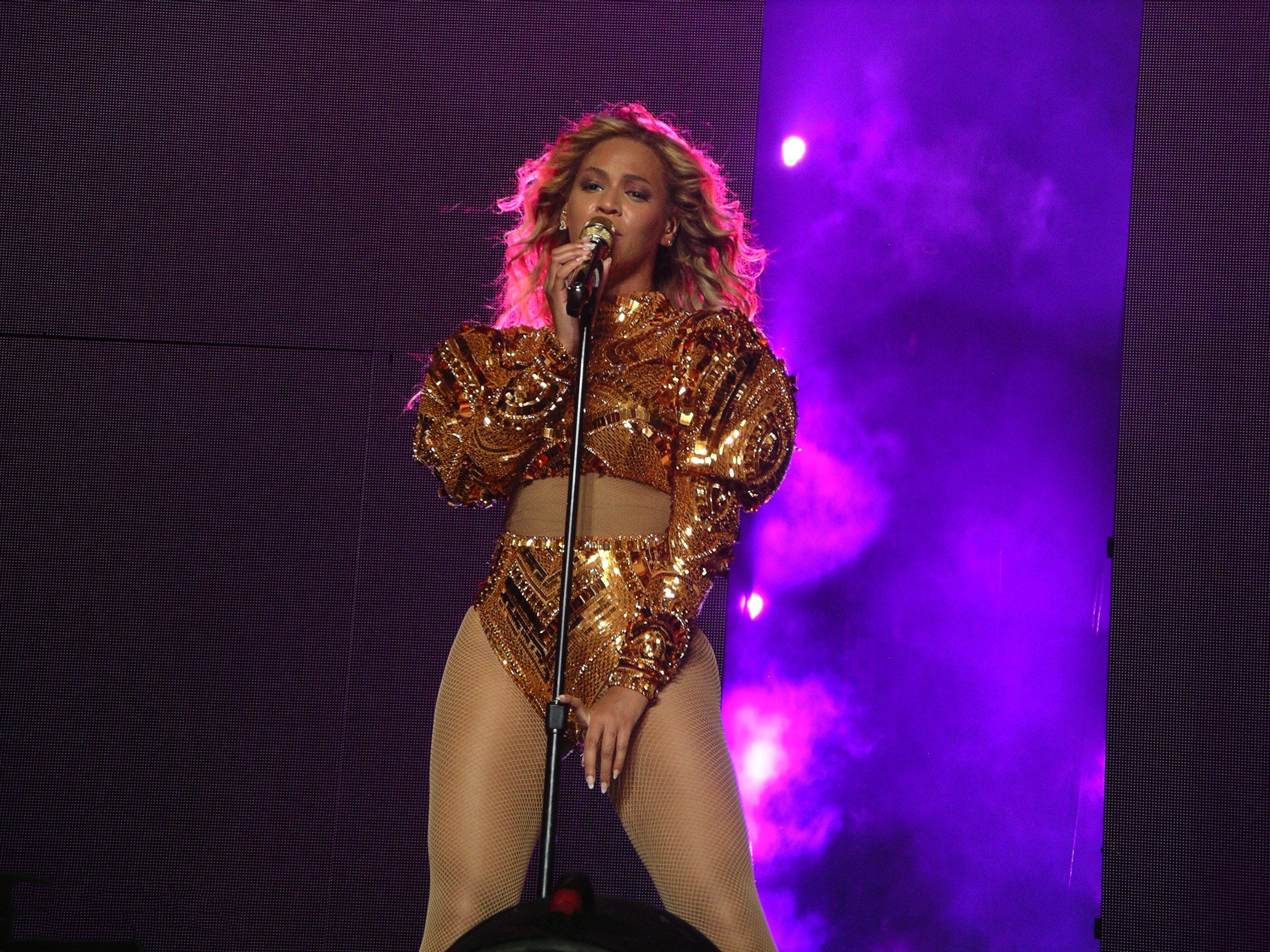
Beyoncé served as the vocalist for the song.

The song started as a hook written by Skylar Grey, who also co-wrote Eminem's 2010 hit single "Love the Way You Lie". Eminem came across the hook when he was working with Rick Rubin and became enamoured of the lyrics. Previously Eminem and Rubin had been discussing the phenomenon of mumble rap, specifically Eminem's frustration with its mainstream popularity, and the hook served as a vehicle for him to vent them. Rubin subsequently played the song for Jay-Z, who was then able to get his wife, Beyoncé, to sing the chorus. Eminem said on the Malcolm Gladwell Broken Record Podcast that the verses were written in Glasgow, Scotland while on tour in 2017. Upon the release of the single, Grey tweeted, "This is the song I've been trying to write since age 6. Every time I wrote a song I hoped it would be this good. I am truly proud of everything I've created, but this is the one."

== Critical reception ==
"Walk on Water" received negative reviews from general public and critics. Jayson Greene of Pitchfork described the song as a "joyless trudge of a power ballad that pairs a softly crooned hook with fuming, escalating verses of rage-spittle." Vulture's reviewer Frank Guan said that it "isn't a great song".

== Release and promotion ==
On November 8, 2017, Eminem tweeted a picture of a doctor's prescription note with the words "'Walk on Water', take as needed" written on it. This has caused speculation that the first single will be titled "Walk on Water". The fake doctor's note was labeled with the logo for Revival. On November 9, Paul Rosenberg shared a video on Instagram that showcased Trevor the spokesperson for the Revival campaign stating that "you will be able to Walk on Water with Revival at noon EST", confirming the song. An audio and a lyric video was uploaded to Eminem's YouTube channel. As of December 25, 2017, the video has over 50 million views and 1 million likes.

== Music video ==
On December 23, 2017, the music video for the song was released exclusively on Apple Music and Eminem's official Vevo channel. It was directed by American director Richard "Rich" Lee, who previously directed Eminem's videos for "Not Afraid", "Rap God", "The Monster" and "Phenomenal". Beyoncé does not appear in the video.

The video starts with a beam of light that turns out to be a special on a microphone. Eminem is sitting next to it lamenting when he finally decides to come up to the mic. The lights slowly come up to reveal an auditorium during the second chorus. Many clones of Eminem are seen typing gibberish into a typewriter. There is then a montage of set pieces being placed on stage to resemble concerts he has performed. During the third chorus, there is a time lapse of fans in the auditorium seats. The fans leave during the third verse when Eminem glitches between different personas and it starts to snow. Eminem is seen in a barren wasteland of ice. He finds a huge statue covered, then, with deliberation, pulls it off. Back to the typewriter room, Eminem starts to write the lyrics to "Stan" and then pulls it out of the typewriter and delivers the closing line, "Bitch, I wrote 'Stan'".

The video received a nomination at the 2018 MTV Video Music Awards for Best Visual Effects.

== Live performances ==
The song was first performed by Eminem at the 2017 MTV Europe Music Awards on November 12 with co-producer and writer Skylar Grey on vocals. Both also performed the song on Saturday Night Live on November 18, along with his previous songs "Stan" and "Love the Way You Lie".

== Commercial performance ==
In the United States, "Walk on Water" debuted and peaked at number 14 on the Billboard Hot 100, becoming the 57th entry for both artists on the chart. As a result, they tied with Madonna and The Rolling Stones for the 19th highest number of overall songs to enter the chart. It also arrived at number 2 on the Digital Songs chart with 64,000 downloads and the Streaming Songs chart at number 15 with 18.3 million streams. It spent five weeks on the Hot 100.

The song opened the UK Singles Chart at number seven, becoming Eminem's 28th entry to reach the nation's top 10 and Beyoncé's 35th. Upon entering at number 10 on the ARIA Singles Chart, it became the rapper's thirteenth song as a lead artist to reach the top 10 in Australia and first since "The Monster" in 2013, and Beyoncé's 22nd, the first since 2011's Run the World (Girls)". Elsewhere, the song debuted at number eight on the Irish Singles Chart, number nine in Sweden, and number four in Scotland.

== Awards and nominations ==
Year	Ceremony	Award	Result
2018	MTV Video Music Awards	Best Visual Effects	Nominated

== Credits and personnel ==
Credits adapted from Revival album liner notes.

Recording and management

- Recorded at Effigy Studios (Detroit) and Shangri La Studio (Malibu)
- Piano recorded at Grizzly Manor Studios (Park City, Utah)
- Mixed at Larrabee Sound Studios (North Hollywood)
- Mastered at Brian Gardner Mastering
- Published by Songs of Universal, Inc./Shroom Shady Music (BMI), Hotel Bravo Music/Universal Music-Z Songs (BMI) o/b/o Skylar Grey/Oakland 13 Music (ASCAP)
- All rights administered by Wb Music Corp. o/b/o Itself and Oakland 13 Music
- Beyoncé appears courtesy of Columbia Records, a division of Sony Music Entertainment

Personnel

- Eminem – vocals, songwriter
- Beyoncé – vocals, songwriter
- Skylar Grey – songwriter, co-producer, piano
- Rick Rubin – producer, turntables
- Mike Strange – recording engineer
- Joe Strange – recording engineer
- Jason Lader – recording engineer, bass, drum programmer, moog, synthesizer, string arranger
- Stuart White – recording engineer
- Rob Bisel – assistant engineer, digital editor
- Johnnie Burik – assistant engineer, digital editor
- Tony Campana – assistant engineer
- The Section Quartet – strings
  - Eric Gorfain – violin
  - Richard Dodd – cello
  - Daphne Chen – violin
  - Leah Katz – viola
- Manny Marroquin – mixer
- Brian "Big Bass" Gardner – mastering engineer
- Jesse DeFlorio – photography

== Charts ==
Weekly chart performance for "Walk on Water"
Chart (2017)	Peak position
Australia (ARIA)	10
Austria (Ö3 Austria Top 40)	13
Belgium (Ultratop 50 Flanders)	32
Belgium (Ultratop 50 Wallonia)	49
Canada Hot 100 (Billboard)	22
Czech Republic Airplay (ČNS IFPI)	95
Czech Republic Singles Digital (ČNS IFPI)	27
Denmark (Tracklisten)	24
France (SNEP)	73
Germany (GfK)	16
Hungary (Single Top 40)	19
Hungary (Stream Top 40)	20
Ireland (IRMA)	8
Israel International TV Airplay (Media Forest)	1
Italy (FIMI)	22
Latvia (DigiTop100)	28
Lebanon Airplay (Lebanese Top 20)	13
Netherlands (Dutch Top 40)	24
Netherlands (Single Top 100)	22
New Zealand (Recorded Music NZ)	18
Norway (VG-lista)	16
Philippines (Philippine Hot 100)	84
Portugal (AFP)	24
Scotland Singles (OCC)	4
Slovakia Singles Digital (ČNS IFPI)	19
Sweden (Sverigetopplistan)	7
Switzerland (Schweizer Hitparade)	5
UK Singles (OCC)	7
US Billboard Hot 100	14
US Hot R&B/Hip-Hop Songs (Billboard)	6
US Rhythmic Airplay (Billboard)	23

== Certifications ==
Certifications for "Walk On Water"
Region	Certification	Certified units/sales
Australia (ARIA)	Platinum	70,000^{‡}
Brazil (Pro-Música Brasil)	Gold	20,000^{‡}
Canada (Music Canada)	Platinum	80,000^{‡}
Italy (FIMI)	Gold	25,000^{‡}
New Zealand (RMNZ)	Gold	15,000^{‡}
Sweden (GLF)	Gold	20,000^{‡}
United Kingdom (BPI)	Silver	200,000^{‡}
United States (RIAA)	Gold	500,000^{‡}
^{‡} Sales+streaming figures based on certification alone.

== Release history ==
Release dates for "Walk on Water"
Region	Date	Format	Label	Ref.
Various	November 10, 2017	Digital download	Aftermath; Shady; Interscope	
United States	November 14, 2017	Rhythmic contemporary radio	Aftermath; Shady; Interscope	
United States	November 14, 2017	Contemporary hit radio	Aftermath; Shady; Interscope	
Italy	November 17, 2017	Contemporary hit radio	Universal	
United Kingdom	November 17, 2017	Contemporary hit radio	Polydor	
