= List of Da Ali G Show home video releases =

This is a list of DVD releases relating to the Channel 4/HBO TV series Da Ali G Show.

== Season releases ==
All season DVD releases are 2-disc sets, unless otherwise indicated.

DVD title	Country of release	Region	Date of release	DVD company	Catalog number	Notes
Ali G - Da UK Seereez	Germany	2	24 May 2007	Ascot Elite		The complete UK series
Da Ali G Show	Sweden	2	2007			The UK series [?]
Ali G in da USAiii	United Kingdom	2	17 November 2003	VCI	VCD0289	First US season, different extras than the R1 release.
Da Ali G Show - Da Compleet First Seazon	United States; Canada	1	17 August 2004	HBO Video	92327	First US season
Ali G - in da USAiii	Germany	2	24 May 2007	Ascot Elite		First US season
Ali G in da USA	Sweden	2	2007			First US season
Da Ali G Show - Da Compleet First Seazon	Netherlands	2		Memphis Belle		The complete UK series. All 6 episodes on one disc.
Da Ali G Show - Da Compleet Second Seazon	United States; Canada	1	13 September 2005	HBO Video	92433	Second US season
Da Ali G Show - Da Compleet Seereez	United States; Canada	1	21 November 2006	HBO Video		4-disc box set release of both US seasons. Has lenticular cover featuring both Ali G and Borat.
Da Ali G Show - Da Compleet Seereez - Da Remix	Australia	4	03 December 2014	Madman		4-disc box set, 20 episodes new intros

== Compilation releases ==
All compilation DVD releases are single-disc, unless otherwise indicated.

DVD title	Country of release	Region	Date of release	DVD company	Catalog number	Notes
Ali G, Innit	United Kingdom	2	18 March 2002	VCI	VCD0048	Ali G interview segments from The Eleven O'Clock Show which later led to the making of Da Ali G Show
Ali G, Aiii	United Kingdom	2	20 November 2000	VCI	VCD0109	Compilation of clips from the UK series, plus unaired segments.
Ali G - Bling Bling	United Kingdom	2	26 November 2001	VCI	VCD0193	Compilation of clips from the UK series, plus unaired segments and an interview with David and Victoria Beckham from a Comic Relief special.
Da Ali G Show - Borat Edition	Germany	2	5 March 2007	Euro Video		Compilation of clips from both the US and UK versions - Amazon.de exclusive cover (?)
Da Ali G Show - Borat Edition	Germany	2	8 March 2007	kurt media		Compilation of clips from both the US and UK versions
Ali G	Netherlands	2	22 November 2007	Universal		3-disc box set of Ali G Indahouse, Aiii and Innit
Da Ali G Show - Brüno Edition	Germany	2	9 July 2009	Ascot Elite Home Entertainment GmbH		Compilation of clips from both the US and UK versions

== Feature film releases ==
All feature film DVD releases are single-disc, unless otherwise indicated.

Film title	Country of release	Region	Date of release	DVD company	Catalog number	Notes
Ali G Indahouse	United Kingdom	2	11 November 2002	Vision Video Ltd.		
Ali G Indahouse	Germany	2	15 May 2003	Universal		
Ali G Indahouse	Japan	2	7 November 2003	Universal		
Ali G Indahouse	United States; Canada	1	2 November 2, 2004	Universal	21982	
Borat: Cultural Learnings of America for Make Benefit Glorious Nation of Kazakhstan	United Kingdom; Germany	2	5 March 2007	20th Century Fox		See main article for more info on DVD release.
Borat: Cultural Learnings of America for Make Benefit Glorious Nation of Kazakhstan	United States; Canada	1	6 March 2007	20th Century Fox		See main article for more info on DVD release.
Borat: Cultural Learnings of America for Make Benefit Glorious Nation of Kazakhstan	Japan	1	21 December 2007	20th Century Fox		Amazon.co.jp exclusive box set with mankini and Borat moustache
Brüno	United Kingdom	2	9 November 2009	Universal		DVD and Blu-ray
Brüno	United States	1	17 November 2009	Universal		DVD and Blu-ray
Brüno	Germany	2	26 November 2009	Universal		DVD and Blu-ray

== Related releases ==
DVD title	Country of release	Region	Date of release	DVD company	Catalog number	Notes
Madonna - Music	United States	1	21 August 2000	Warner Reprise Video	38526-2	DVD single of the music video in which Ali G makes an appearance as Madonna's limo driver.
