= List of Da Ali G Show episodes =

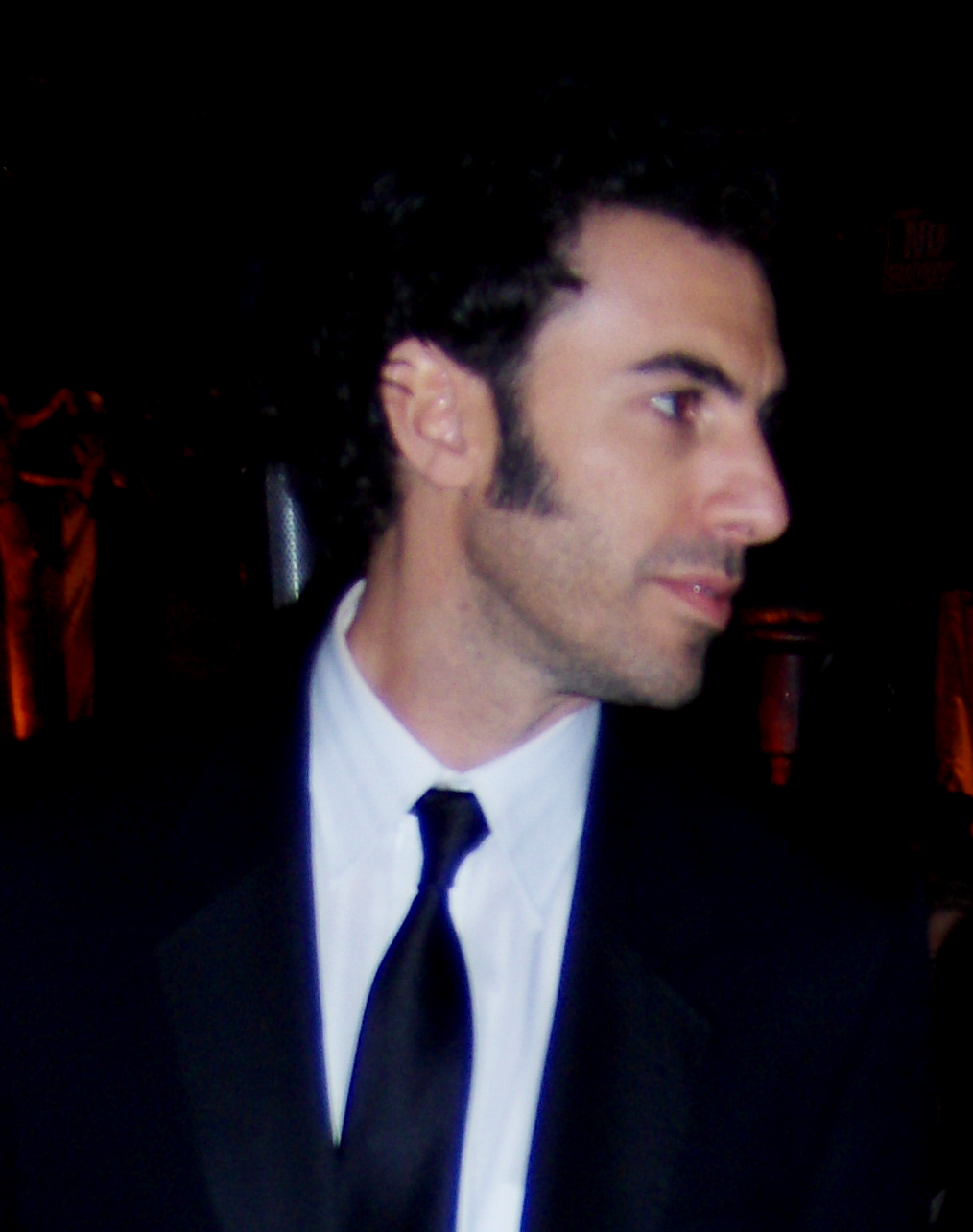
Series creator Sacha Baron Cohen played the main character Ali G, as well as the other two unorthodox journalists, Borat Sagdiyev and Brüno Gehard.

The Da Ali G Show is a satirical television series created by Sacha Baron Cohen that aired for three 6–episode seasons. In the series, Baron Cohen plays three unorthodox journalists: Ali G, Borat Sagdiyev and Brüno Gehard. The first season took place in the UK and aired on Channel 4 from 30 March 2000, to 5 May 2000, while the second and third seasons took place in the US and aired on HBO from 21 February 2003, to 22 August 2004, and are known as Ali G in da USAiii in countries the original season aired in. All three seasons are available on DVD. Four spin-off films: Ali G Indahouse, Borat: Cultural Learnings of America for Make Benefit Glorious Nation of Kazakhstan, Brüno and Borat Subsequent Moviefilm: Delivery of Prodigious Bribe to American Regime for Make Benefit Once Glorious Nation of Kazakhstan have also been released. The show was a critical success and received a number of awards and nominations.

== Series overview ==
Series	Episodes	Originally released		
Series	Episodes	First released	Last released	Network
1	6	30 March 2000	5 May 2000	Channel 4
2	6	21 February 2003	28 March 2003	HBO
3	6	18 July 2004	22 August 2004	HBO

== Episodes ==
=== Season 1 (2000) ===
No. overall	No. in season	Title	Original release date
1	1	"Neil Hamilton"	30 March 2000
Skit: Ali pitches his new movie Booka in Cannes; Interviewee: Neil Hamilton; The Message: Ali leads a roundtable discussion on Animal Rights; Ali G hosts the game show Who Wants to Win an Ounce? Borat learns about British etiquette Music Guest: Gaz Coombes of Supergrass; Ali's Final Thought
2	2	"John Humphrys"	7 April 2000
Skit: Ali rescues a "fit bitch" from prison and speaks about respect The Message: Politics; DJ Tha4orce: "You touch my decks you die!" Interviewee: John Humphrys; Ali G presents his new home shopping channel, QVG; Borat learns about British comedy Music Guest: Fran Healy from Travis
3	3	"Roy Hattersley"	14 April 2000
Skit: Ali is picked out of a police lineup Ali G visits Hollywood to learn about US TV, including Sally Jessy Raphael; DJ Tha4orce reminisces about Ali's Julie; Interviewee: Roy Hattersley; The Message: Family; Ali G "Turns the tables in the Third World with Turntables"; Music Guest: Chrissie Hynde of The Pretenders
4	4	"Mohamed Al Fayed"	21 April 2000
Skit: Ali is sentenced to death by electricity Ali G learns about the FB, Aiiii. DJ Tha4orce speaks to Ali's DJing skills Interviewee: Mohamed Al Fayed; Ali G learns about dangerous Drugs; Borat learns about hunting in Britain; Music: Ali jams with Mohamed Al Fayed
5	5	"Gail Porter"	28 April 2000
Skit: Ali's musical tribute to his childhood The Message: The Environment; Borat visits Cambridge University; Ali G warns the St. Lawrence Crew; Interviewee: Gail Porter; Ali G visits the National Rifle Association of America and learns about gun rights Music: Ali sings "Amazing Staines"
6	6	"Anita Roddick"	5 May 2000
Skit: Ali dies defending an "Increase da Peace" meeting and meets Jah; Ali G learns about illegal weapons DJ Tha4orce: Ali learns to speak Jamaican; Interviewee: Anita Roddick; The Message: Medical ethics Borat visits the Henley Regatta; Music guest: Jarvis Cocker; Ali's Final Thought

=== Season 2 (2003) ===
No. overall	No. in season	Title	Original release date
7	1	"Law"	21 February 2003
Ali G takes the job of a police officer for a day at the Philadelphia Police Department. Borat visits a dating agency; gets advice on American dating. Brüno interviews "PR guru" Paul Wilmot and visits New York for fashion week. Interviewee: Former U.S. Attorney General Dick Thornburgh
8	2	"War"	28 February 2003
Ali G visits the United Nations where he interviews Boutros Boutros-Ghali. Ali G leads a roundtable discussion on religion. Borat provides a guide to etiquette. Interviewee: Former U.S. National Security Advisor General Brent Scowcroft.
9	3	"Politics"	7 March 2003
Interviewee: Newt Gingrich. Brüno visits New York for fashion week. Ali G attempts to interest investors (including Donald Trump) in his ice cream glove. Borat provides a guide to American hobbies. Ali G interviews a special agent of the DEA about drugs.
10	4	"Art"	14 March 2003
Ali G learns about art (from, among others, James Lipton). Borat learns about acting. Ali G leads a roundtable discussion on the media. Brüno visits Los Angeles. Interviewee: Former astronaut Buzz Aldrin.
11	5	"Science"	21 March 2003
Ali G leads a roundtable discussion on science and technology, featuring creationist Kent Hovind. Borat visits a spiritual healer and an exercise instructor. Ali G interviews Ralph Nader, and attends an anti-nuclear protest. Interviewee: Former U.S. Surgeon General C. Everett Koop.
12	6	"Belief"	28 March 2003
Ali G attempts to interest Hollywood producers in his James Bond television show concept. Borat visits the South. Ali G leads a roundtable discussion on sex. Brüno visits Alabama. Interviewees: Former U.S. Secretary of State James Baker and former White House Press Secretary Marlin Fitzwater.

=== Season 3 (2004) ===
No. overall	No. in season	Title	Original release date
13	1	"Respek"	18 July 2004
Interviewee: Sam Donaldson; Borat goes wine tasting. Ali G learns about the US criminal justice system. Brüno interviews Pastor Quinn the "Gay Converter".
14	2	"Rekognize"	25 July 2004
Interviewee: Pat Buchanan; Borat learns about American politics with James Broadwater. Ali G leads a roundtable "diskushen" about the family. Ali G learns about animals on a farm.
15	3	"Peace"	1 August 2004
Ali G pitches his book ideas to literary agents and publishers. Brüno leads the "fashion polizei". Interviewee: President of the US Olympians Association John Naber; Ali G leads a roundtable "diskushen" about politics. Borat learns "how to be country music star" from Porter Wagoner and then sings "In My Country There Is Problem" from the Country West's stage.
16	4	"Realize"	8 August 2004
Interviewee: Former head of the Immigration and Naturalization Service James Ziglar; Borat learns about American hobbies by visiting a self-defense expert, a yoga teacher, and a New Age dance class. Ali G learns about the environment from Christine Todd Whitman and advocates of Earth First!. Brüno visits Miami. Ali G leads a roundtable "diskushen" about animal rights.
17	5	"Jah"	15 August 2004
Ali G interviews Gore Vidal about history and visits Mount Vernon. Borat learns about buying a house in a gated community. Ali G learns from sex educator Sally Epstein. Brüno attends a barn dance in Georgia. Ali G leads a roundtable "diskushen" about medical ethics.
18	6	"Realness"	22 August 2004
Ali G learns about gender issues by getting relationship advice from author Dr. John Gray, and attending a pro-choice rally in Washington D.C. Borat goes job-hunting, learning about American work ethics from various employment agencies. Interviewee: Former presidential economics adviser Dr. Charles Schultze. Brüno gets wrestling lessons from a college team on Spring Break in Daytona Beach. Ali G gets some grammar tips from 60 Minutes pundit Andy Rooney.

== See also ==
- List of Da Ali G Show DVD releases
- Ali G Indahouse (2002)
- Borat (2006)
- Brüno (2009)
