= Ali G, Aiii =

- Directed by: James Bobin; Steve Smith
- Written by: Sacha Baron Cohen
- Produced by: Dan Mazer
- Starring: Sacha Baron Cohen
- Distributed by: VCI
- Release date: 20 November 2000 (DVD)
- Running time: 103 minutes
- Country: United Kingdom
- Language: English

Ali G, Aiii is a straight-to-video release of clips from Da Ali G Show (original, UK series) plus unaired segments from the show, hosted by Ali G himself. The word "Aiii" refers to Ali G's slang/slur loosely pronounced "Ah-eye" and meaning "all right".

== Contents ==
1. Welcome
2. Titles
3. Heaven
4. Dangerous 'Drugs'
5. FBI
6. Studio 54
7. Paul Daniels
8. Borat's Guide to Etiquette
9. Kids of Courage
10. Gail Porter
11. Cannes Porn Festival
12. Mohamed Al-Fayed
13. Borat's Guide to Hunting
14. Animal Rights
15. Space
16. "I Believe I Can Fly"
17. Borat's Guide to English Gentlemen
18. Discussion Medley
19. Increase Da Peace
20. Dangerous 'Weapons'
21. Guns
22. Religion
23. Borat's Guide to Henley
24. Goodbye
25. Jarvis Cocker
26. Ali's Final Thought
27. Out-takes and End Credits

=== Bonus features ===
1. Ali G's Christmas Message to the Nation
2. Easter Egg - A blond Brüno covers a punk music festival. Most likely from The Paramount Comedy Channel
