= Physical comedy =

Comedy genre

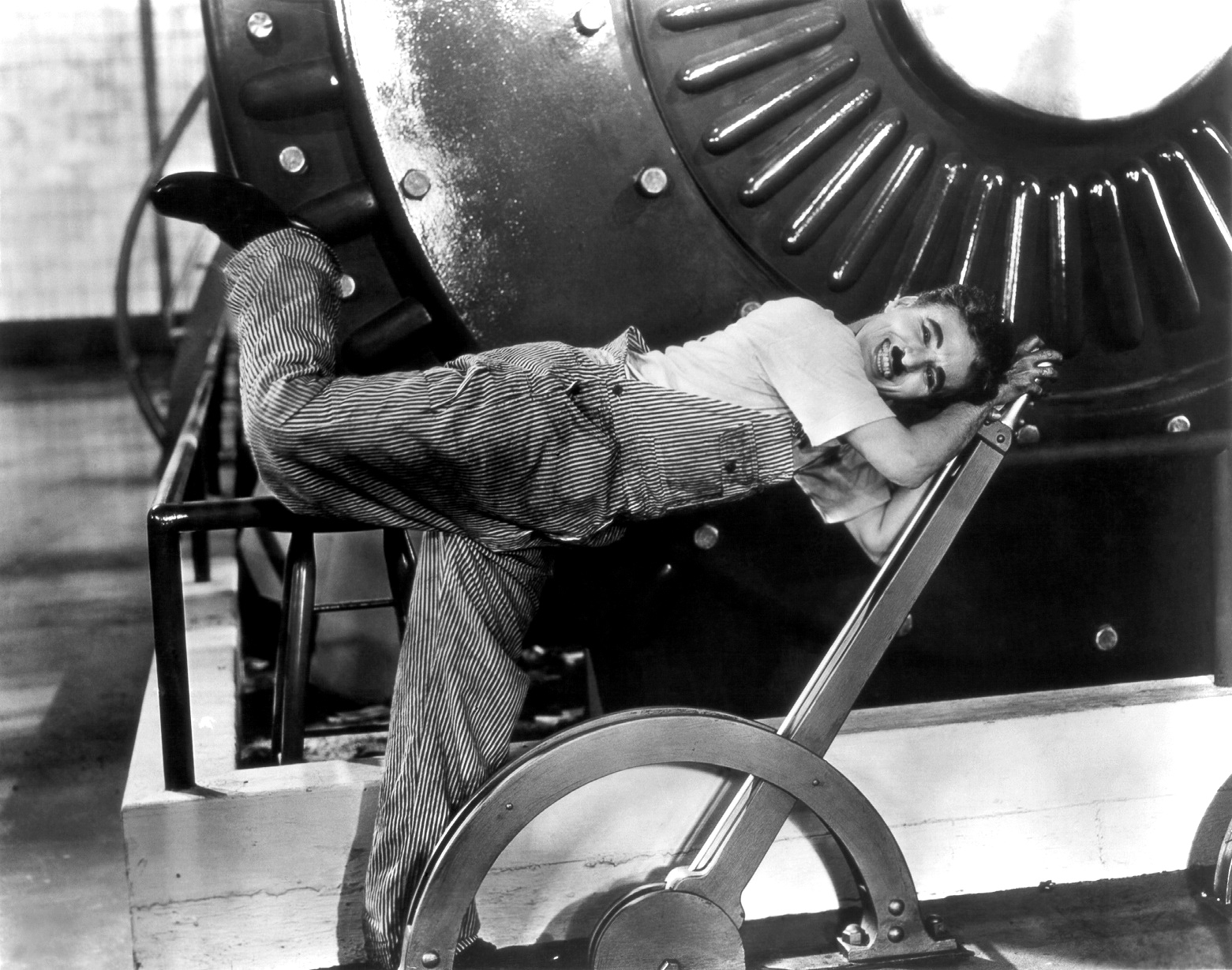
An example of physical comedy as Charlie Chaplin wrestles with factory controls in his 1936 comedy Modern Times

Physical comedy is a form of comedy focused on manipulation of the body for a humorous effect. It can include slapstick, clowning, mime, physical stunts, or making funny faces.

Physical comedy originated as part of the Commedia dell'arte. It is now sometimes incorporated into sitcoms; for example, in the sitcom Three's Company, actor John Ritter frequently performed pratfalls. Cartoons, particularly film shorts, also commonly depict an exaggerated form of physical comedy (incorporating cartoon physics), such as in Tom and Jerry and Wile E. Coyote and the Road Runner.

== Examples ==
Charlie Chaplin started his film career as a physical comedian; although he developed additional means of comic expression, Chaplin's mature works continued to contain elements of slapstick.

In the movies, physical comedy is used by, for example,

- Buster Keaton as the eponymous character in Steamboat Bill, Jr.,
- Jacques Tati as Monsieur Hulot,
- Peter Sellers as Chief Inspector Clouseau in The Pink Panther film series,
- Jackie Chan in many of his Hong Kong action comedy films,
- Zero Mostel's character Max Bialystock in The Producers,
- Bette Midler's, Goldie Hawn's and Diane Keaton's characters in The First Wives Club,
- Arnold Schwarzenegger's and Danny DeVito's characters in Twins,
- Will Ferrell's and John C. Reilly's characters in Step Brothers,
- Zac Efron's and Adam DeVine's characters in Mike and Dave Need Wedding Dates.
- Sacha Baron Cohen's characters Borat Sagdiyev and Brüno Gehard in Borat (as well as its sequel Borat Subsequent Moviefilm) and Brüno.
- Chris Farley's and David Spade's characters in Tommy Boy,
- Jim Carrey's character in Liar, Liar and multiple other films.

In television sitcoms, the use of physical comedy was seen in, for example,

- Dick Van Dyke's character Rob Petrie in The Dick Van Dyke Show,
- Lucille Ball's character Lucy Ricardo in I Love Lucy,
- Martin Lawrence's character Martin Payne in Martin,
- Larry Hagman's character Major Anthony Nelson in I Dream of Jeannie,
- John Ritter's character Jack Tripper in Three's Company,
- The two main characters of Mark Linn-Baker and Bronson Pinchot in Perfect Strangers,
- Michael Richards's character Cosmo Kramer in Seinfeld,
- Penny Marshall's character Laverne DeFazio and Cindy Williams' character Shirley Feeney in Laverne & Shirley,
- Jennifer Saunders' character Edina Monsoon and Joanna Lumley's character Patsy Stone in Absolutely Fabulous,
- Nicholas Lyndhurst's character Rodney Trotter in Only Fools and Horses,
- Neil Morrissey's character Tony Smart in Men Behaving Badly,
- Jennifer Aniston's character Rachel Green in Friends,
- Rowan Atkinson's character in Mr. Bean and Man vs. Bee,
- Jaleel White's character Steve Urkel in Family Matters,
- Rik Mayall's and Adrian Edmondson's characters Richard Richard and Eddie Hitler in Bottom,
- James Corden's character Neil Smith in Gavin & Stacey,
- Jim Belushi and Larry Joe Campbell's characters Jim and Andy in According to Jim

== See also ==
- Slapstick
- Comedy
- Physical theatre
- Funny Business
