= Bling Bling (video) =

2001 Da Ali G Show home video by James Bobin

- Directed by: James Bobin
- Written by: Sacha Baron Cohen
- Produced by: Dan Mazer
- Starring: Sacha Baron Cohen
- Distributed by: VCI
- Release date: 26 November 2001 (DVD)
- Running time: 142 minutes
- Country: United Kingdom
- Language: English

Bling Bling is a straight-to-video release of clips from the Da Ali G Show, plus unaired segments and an interview with David and Victoria Beckham from a Comic Relief special. It is hosted by Ali G himself.

== Contents ==
1. Introduction
2. Posh & Bex
3. Economiks
4. Evolushun
5. L.A. Gangz with Alex Alonso
6. nhawan
7. Crime
8. More Animalz
9. Ghosts
10. Borat Jagshemash
11. Edinbur Festival
12. Politics
13. A Real Lord
14. Bowling
15. Posh & Bex (part 2)
16. Da End

=== DVD Extraz ===
1. Extended and unseen interviews
2. Trailer for Ali G Indahouse
