= I Give It a Year =

2013 British romantic comedy film by Dan Mazer

- UK release poster
- Directed by: Dan Mazer
- Written by: Dan Mazer
- Produced by: Tim Bevan; Eric Fellner; Kris Thykier
- Starring: Rose Byrne; Rafe Spall; Anna Faris; Simon Baker; Stephen Merchant; Minnie Driver; Jason Flemyng; Olivia Colman
- Cinematography: Ben Davis
- Edited by: Tony Cranstoun
- Music by: Ilan Eshkeri
- Production companies: Working Title Films; Canal+ Ciné+ TF1 Films Production; Anton Capital Entertainment; Paradis Films
- Distributed by: StudioCanal
- Release date: 8 February 2013 (United Kingdom)
- Running time: 97 minutes
- Countries: United Kingdom; France
- Language: English
- Budget: €12.7 million
- Box office: $28.2 million

I Give It a Year is a 2013 romantic comedy film, written and directed by Dan Mazer in his directorial debut. It stars Rose Byrne, Rafe Spall, Anna Faris and Simon Baker. Set and filmed in London, it was released on 8 February 2013.

Mazer was previously known for co-writing the Sacha Baron Cohen films Borat and Brüno.

== Plot ==
Ambitious advertising executive Nat and struggling writer Josh experience love at first sight at a party. After seven months together, they get engaged.

Their first year of marriage is a struggle, and film then switches back and forth from flashbacks of the year to their meetings with a marriage counsellor.

Their wedding goes smoothly despite many friends commenting that the marriage will not last, an embarrassing best man's speech, and a priest having a coughing fit.

When Nat returns to work after the honeymoon, she is tasked with a presentation for Guy, an American who is rebranding his solvent business. Her co-workers tell her to hide she is married to secure his business.

Later, Josh and Nat host a dinner to use their wedding gifts. Their differences are highlighted when describing their Moroccan honeymoon; they disagree about what they enjoyed. Changing the topic to Chloe, Josh's former flame, Nat discovers Josh had not split with Chloe before her four-year Africa stint. Chloe apologises to her privately for assuming she knew, and they talk of marriage's constrictions. Nat's sister Naomi has issues with her own husband's annoying habits. Josh's best man, Danny, hits on Chloe but is rebuffed.

At Christmas, Nat tries to discourage Josh from attending her work party so she can flirt with Guy, but he insists on going. At the party, he embarrasses her constantly. When he approaches Nat while she is with Guy, she does not reveal they are married, so Guy tries to shake him off. He asks her to dinner, but Nat declines. Annoyed at Josh for embarrassing her, she leaves without him.

Meanwhile, Chloe's work dinner is at an Indian restaurant. Later, she almost has a threesome with her current boyfriend and a coworker, but ends up leaving. The next day, she calls Josh, who comforts her. Looking for Nat's Christmas present in a lingerie shop, Chloe has Josh help fasten a bra she is trying on and they end up kissing.

Simultaneously, Nat has a business meeting with Guy, who professes his feelings for her with a violinist and doves. She confesses she is married and needs stability, although she wants to be with him. As they leave the hotel, they run into Josh and Chloe, and Guy recognises Josh from the party. Josh suggests Guy and Chloe have a double date with them, as they are both Americans.

Meeting at a bar to play pool, there are signs of jealousy among them. The night ends with all four leaving together and Nat telling Guy she needs to discuss work with him, while Josh helps Chloe hail a taxicab.

Chloe tells Josh she cannot handle seeing him with Nat because she is still in love with him, so she must cut ties. As Nat and Guy are walking, she shoves him into a doorway and they kiss passionately. Guy admires her underwear set, the same one Chloe was wearing when she kissed Josh. Nat tells Guy to rip the bra when he cannot get it off.

Later, Nat tells Josh they need to talk. Agreeing that something is not right in their marriage, they go to marriage counselling. The counsellor suggests they try to make their marriage work for the next three months. They do, but clearly they are still unhappy.

On their first anniversary, they are planning to celebrate later. Josh hurriedly leaves, promising to meet Nat at the restaurant. Driving to Chloe's, he sees Guy and Chloe leaving together for a trip. Nat contemplates calling Guy.

Josh arrives at the restaurant, to a surprise party with their immediate family. He tells Nat he thinks she is the perfect wife, just not for him. Josh asks for a divorce and she delightedly agrees. They rejoice and immediately leave the party separately.

Meanwhile, Guy and Chloe are at St Pancras station, about to take a romantic trip to Paris. Finding them, Josh professes his love for Chloe, revealing he has split up with Nat. Nat then appears behind Josh, who awkwardly assumes she wants to reunite with him, but she is there for Guy. After a short exchange, they happily discuss how perfect Guy and Chloe are for Nat and Josh.

Chloe and Guy mutually break up; Nat kisses Guy and Chloe kisses Josh.

== Cast ==
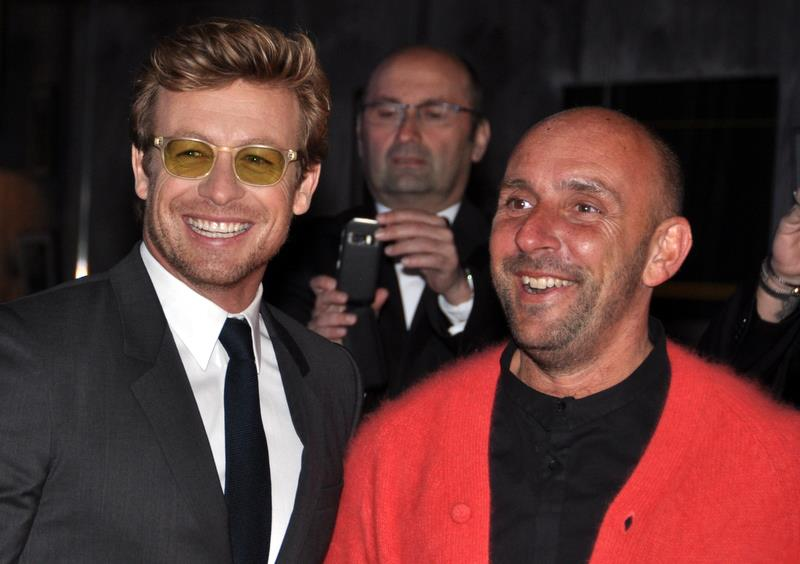
Actor Simon Baker and director Dan Mazer in Paris at the film's French premiere, April 2013.

- Rose Byrne as Nat Redfern
- Rafe Spall as Josh Moss
- Anna Faris as Chloe
- Simon Baker as Guy Harrap
- Stephen Merchant as Danny
- Minnie Driver as Naomi
- Jason Flemyng as Hugh
- Olivia Colman as Linda
- Jane Asher as Diana
- Terence Harvey as Alec
- Nigel Planer as Brian
- Clare Higgins as Elaine
- Sue Wallace as Janet
- Daisy Haggard as Helen

== Reception ==
On the review aggregator website Rotten Tomatoes, 53% of 80 critics' reviews are positive. The website's consensus for the film reads, "It's nowhere near as inventive as its reverse rom-com premise might suggest, but I Give It a Year is disarmingly frank -- and often quite funny." On Metacritic, the film has a score of 50% based on reviews from 23 critics, indicating "mixed or average reviews".

Peter Keough of The Boston Globe wrote "Though Mazer's ambition is laudable, he has not yet integrated the comedy of manners into the comedy of no manners." Stephanie Merry of The Washington Post wrote "In addition to some trite set pieces, writer-director Dan Mazer serves up nothing more than conspicuous cynicism masquerading as comedy."

Peter Bradshaw of The Guardian gave the film 3 out of 5 stars and wrote: "The result is funny and plausible, with a fair bit of newly modish Bridesmaidsy bad taste, though I kept getting the sense that the romcom template meant Mazer couldn't really let rip with pure comedy pessimism and cynicism in the way he might have liked." Olly Richards of Empire wrote: "The jokes are strong and delivered by a very talented cast, but the heart isn't there. It's easy to laugh, but hard to care."

=== Box office ===
The film accumulated a total domestic gross of $34,657 with it only generating $5,436 on its opening weekend, ranking it at #77. It went on gross a worldwide total of $28,234,657.

== Home media ==
I Give It a Year was released on DVD and Blu-ray on June 3, 2013.
