= Music (Madonna song) =

2000 song by Madonna

Single by Madonna

from the album Music
- B-side: "Cyber-Raga"
- Released: August 1, 2000
- Studio: Sarm West (London)
- Genre: Dance-pop; electro-funk; electropop; disco
- Length: 3:44
- Label: Maverick; Warner Bros.
- Songwriters: Madonna; Mirwais Ahmadzaï
- Producers: Madonna; Mirwais Ahmadzaï

Madonna singles chronology
"American Pie" (2000)	"Music" (2000)	"Don't Tell Me" (2000)

Music videos
- "Music" on YouTube; "Music [TV Edit]" on YouTube

"Music" is a song recorded by American singer Madonna for her eighth studio album of the same title (2000). Inspired by a Sting concert Madonna attended, she wrote and produced the song with Mirwais Ahmadzaï. It is an electropop, disco, electro-funk and dance-pop song in a static key of G minor. Madonna's vocals are electronically manipulated on the track, with the lyrics having political and social undertones and reiterating the uniting power of music. The song was released as the lead single from Music on August 1, 2000, by Maverick Records and Warner Bros. Records.

Before its official release, "Music" leaked onto the internet and was put up for listening in websites like Napster, which prompted Madonna's team to issue a statement threatening legal action. The track had different release formats with a number of remixes commissioned for the song. Music critics praised the track's production, catchiness and club-friendly nature, and compared it with Madonna's previous releases. It charted at number one in Australia, Canada, the Czech Republic, Greece, Hungary, Iceland, Italy, Japan, New Zealand, Norway, Poland, Portugal, Romania, Spain, Switzerland, the United Kingdom and the United States. "Music" was also the longest running number-one song on the US Dance Club Play chart, spending a total of five weeks at the top. It has been included in many critic lists for Madonna's top singles and is often ranked as one of the best songs of the 2000s.

The song's accompanying music video, directed by Jonas Åkerlund, portrayed Madonna and her friends enjoying themselves, while traveling in a limousine driven by comedian Sacha Baron Cohen as Ali G. Academics noted the use of American imagery in the clip, especially Madonna's cowboy garb and her popularizing of cowboy fashion. In order to promote its parent album, Madonna performed "Music" at the 2000 MTV Europe Music Awards and at the 43rd Annual Grammy Awards the following year, where it was nominated in the categories of Record of the Year and Best Female Pop Vocal Performance. Additionally, the song has been a regular staple in the set list of five of Madonna's concert tours, the last being the Rebel Heart Tour (2015–2016).

== Background and writing ==
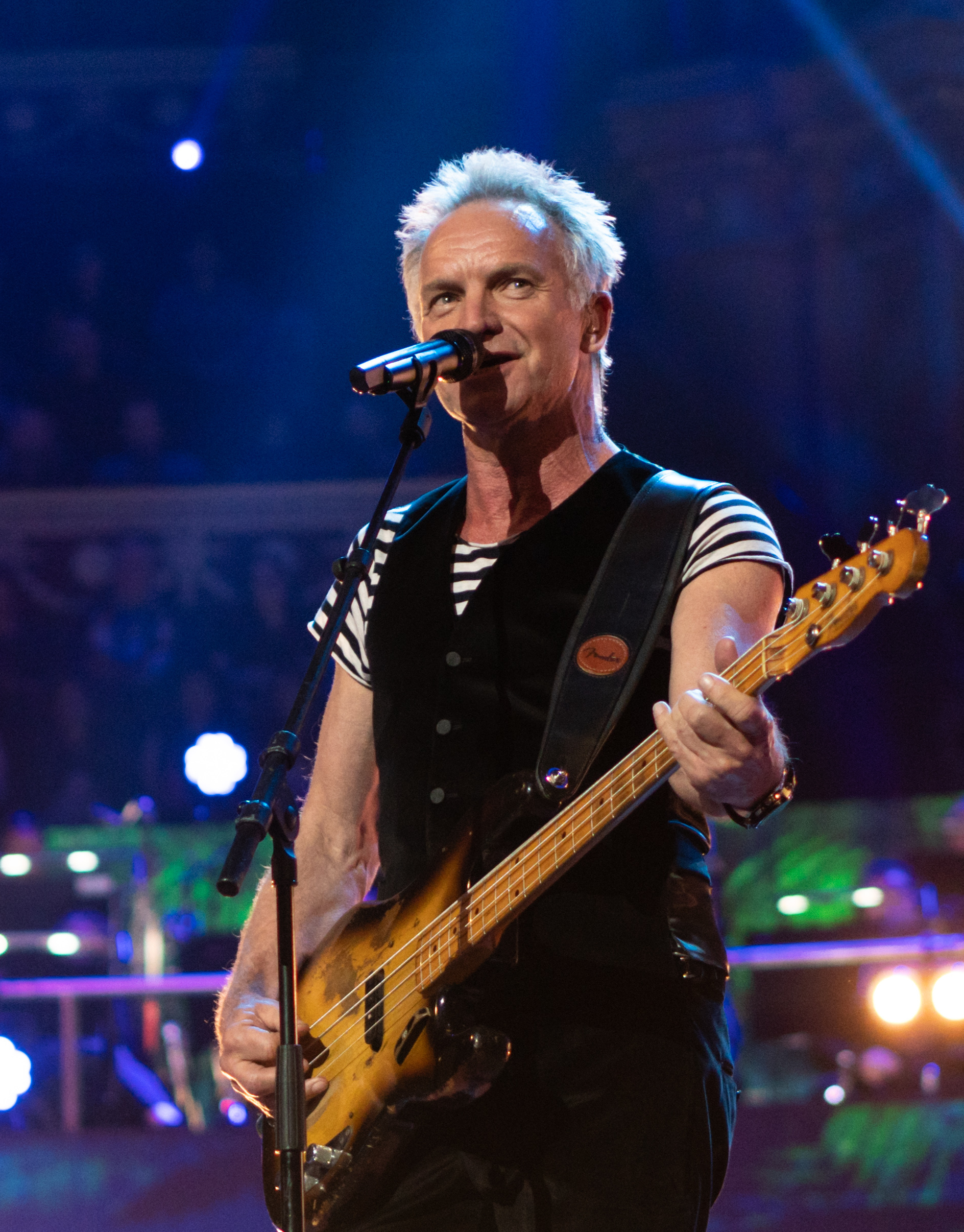
Madonna was inspired to write "Music" after attending a Sting concert at New York City's Beacon Theatre in November 1999.

After the critical and commercial success of her seventh studio album, Ray of Light (1998), Madonna intended to embark on a new concert tour in 1999, but due to the delay of her film, The Next Best Thing, it was cancelled. By 2000, Madonna was dating director Guy Ritchie, and was pregnant with their child. Wanting to distract herself from the media frenzy surrounding the pregnancy, she concentrated on the development of her eighth studio album, Music. Ray of Light's success had made Madonna keen to go into a recording studio and she was introduced to French DJ and producer Mirwais Ahmadzaï through photographer Stéphane Sednaoui.

In an interview with CNN, Madonna recalled that her Maverick Records company partner Guy Oseary "was given a demo by a French artist called Mirwais [Ahmadzaï]". He wanted Madonna's opinion on whether Ahmadzaï could be signed to Maverick, as he was still largely unknown in the United States. Ahmadzaï had always preferred taking musical risks and hence he wanted the collaborations with Madonna to get the best out of her. "The challenge was to make something current appear, something hidden in her personality. Everybody knows [Madonna] as a chameleon, as a businesswoman. I wanted to show her potential as a musician," he said.

Following the introspective mood on Ray of Light, Madonna was ready to be energetic with the new album, and for the title track she wanted something that would make her "feel like an animal, ready to sprung". Madonna said that the inspiration behind "Music" came from a Sting concert that she had attended at New York City's Beacon Theatre in November 1999. There, the audience was well-behaved until Sting began playing old hits by his band, The Police. The lights were dimmed and everyone came closer to the stage to listen to Sting. "Suddenly, people lost their inhibition and their politeness, and everyone was practically holding hands... I mean, it really moved me," she told Rolling Stone's Jancee Dunn. "And I thought, 'That's what music does to people'". This experience inspired Madonna to write the primary hook of the song, "Music makes people come together / Music, mix the bourgeoisie and the rebel".

== Recording and composition ==
"Music"
A 22-second sample of the song, featuring Madonna singing the chorus. The sample shows the dry sound of the production, with heavy usage of equalization which created contrasts with the vocal.

Recording sessions for Music began in September 1999 at Sarm West Studios in West London. An energetic Madonna wanted to make the title track a party song and a statement about love. Together with Ahmadzaï she started writing down the different parts of the song, picking up chords on guitar and lyrics. Following the completion of the song "Paradise (Not For Me)", they started experimenting with electro funk for "Music" and created the primary base of the track. "It's not experimental", Ahmadzaï recalled "but its not completely easy. It was a small victory for underground music". According to Madonna, writing and producing "Music" with Ahmadzaï set the tone of the rest of the parent album. But she faced communication problems with Ahmadzaï since he barely spoke English. "The first couple of days we were recording, I wanted to rip my hair out," Madonna recalled. She asked his manager to step in as translator.

"Music" begins with Madonna's androgynous voice uttering the line "Hey Mr. DJ, put a record on, I wanna dance with my baby". After that lyric, her electronically manipulated voice asks "Do you like to boogie woogie?". The producer used an EMS 2000 vocoder to twist the vocals and described to Ernie Rideout of Keyboard as an effect of going "in fits and starts". Mark "Spike" Stent recorded the song on a SSL 9000J console using a Sony 3348 HR and a BASF 931 tape. He mixed it at London's Olympic Studios using SSL G Series Quantegy magnetic tapes. Tim Young mastered the track at Metropolis Studio at Chiswick, London. According to Rikky Rooksby, author of Madonna: The Complete Guide to her Music, the whole production has a dry sound with heavy usage of equalization which created contrast in the vocal, continuing till the first chorus. Guitar flicks can be heard with keyboard chords on the bridge. The music travels from right to left and vice versa when heard on a headphone. Musician Stuart Price, who worked the song for Madonna's 2001 Drowned World Tour, added that the rhythmic structure of "Music" was inspired from Kraftwerk's 1977 single, "Trans-Europe Express".

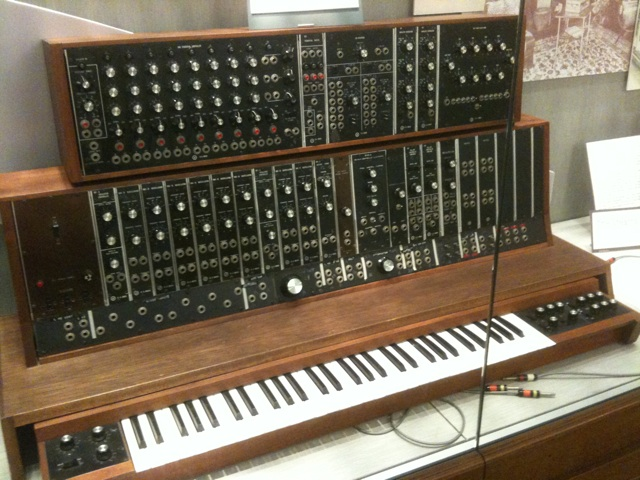
An analogue Moog synthesizer was used for creating the instrumental riff in "Music".

Harmonically, "Music" has a time signature of common time, and its composition is based on a static key of G minor with a moderate tempo of 120 beats per minute. Madonna's vocals range from G♭_{3} to two-lined note of D_{5}, with a basic sequence of Gm–F–Gm–F as its chord progression. According to the book Madonna's Drowned Worlds, written by Santiago Fouz-Hernández and Freya Jarman-Ivens, "Music" is a "disco anthem, and the beat commands [the people] to get up and dance". The authors noted that the music was the central identification for the song, with its "splashes of electronica and production tricks" from reverse cymbal crescendo, and "tightly quantized" pitch and sounds from a Hammond organ. Madonna sang with her mouth close to the recording microphone, which Fouz-Hernández found gave the track a natural sound. Barry Walters from Billboard found the composition to also contain a blend of French electronica and 1970s electro funk, while Richard S. He of the same publication described the record as "postmodern, escapist dance-pop". Another Billboard writer, Jason Lipshutz said the song was an "electro-pop euphoria". The instrumental riff in the track is created by a 1970s analogue Moog synthesizer, which ultimately leads to the song fading out. The production in "Music" not only referenced disco and funk, but was also campy in nature as noted by Jarman-Ivens.

Lyrically the song reiterates the uniting power of music. The primary hook was deemed as having political implications, with Madonna renouncing the bourgeoisie. Fouz-Hernández believed that the line "I wanna dance with my baby" reinforced a connection with gay listeners because of its "casual, campy style". He compared the track to Madonna's first single, "Everybody" (1982), because in both songs she declares that music "has the power to overcome divisions of race, gender, and sexuality". It also recalled Madonna's early days of being carefree and living alone in New York, while being a staple in the city's night-club scene. According to Billboard, Madonna's vocals "binds a mind-blowing melange of hyperactive beats, grooves, and stinging percussive elements" in the track. The magazine adds that the song is also "saturated" with the influence of Cameo, Herbie Hancock, Nitzer Ebb and Roger Troutman.

== Release detail and leaks ==
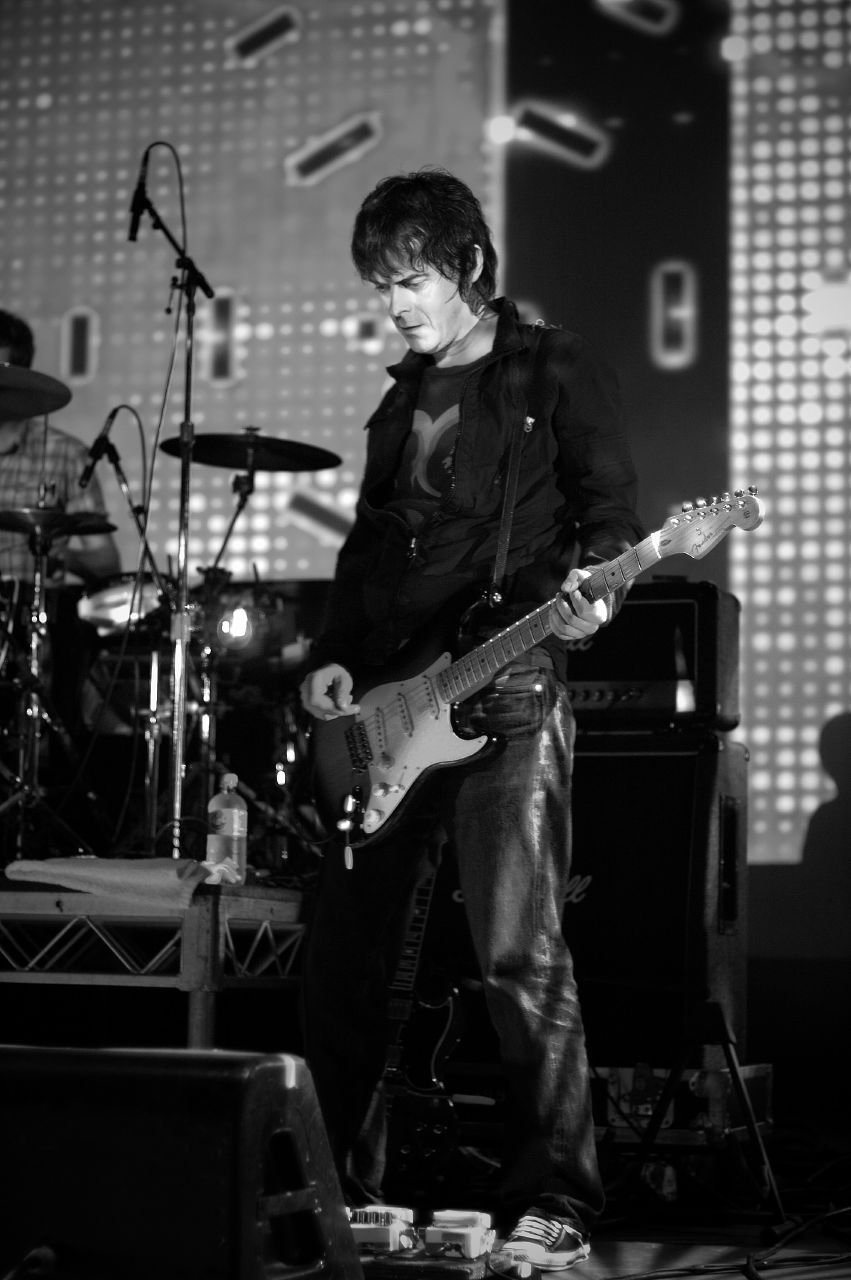
Groove Armada remixed "Music", along with Deep Dish, Victor Calderone and Hex Hector.

On June 2, 2000, an unauthorized incomplete demo of the song leaked onto the internet. Snippets of the tracks, ranging from 30 seconds to almost three minutes were circulated through fan websites and music download site, Napster. Madonna's spokeswoman Caresse Norman said that it was an unfinished version. Warner Bros. Records also issued another statement threatening legal actions against Napster lest the song was removed and added their expectation for "the owners who have included this material on their site will comply immediately with our legitimate request that they cease permitting unauthorized downloads of this song." Madonna was disappointed, publishing a letter about the leak on Icon, the magazine released quarterly for her official fanclub. The threatened lawsuit against the leak was reported in the media as Madonna being against Napster, which Madonna clarified was contrary and she "found it a great way for listeners to access music".

Warner Bros. Records initially targeted the single to be released to radio in July 2000, but it was pushed back to August 1, with the commercial release for the CD single taking place on August 21. A new website called madonnamusic.com was created for the single's release with Madonna releasing a message to her fans: "You've probably been hearing about my new record 'Music' for a while, but I just wanted to make sure that you know the single is going to drop very soon. I worked on this track with a French guy called Mirwais and he is the shit."

The CD and the B-side of the "Music" cassette single featured the track "Cyberraga", a collaboration with Talvin Singh. "Music" was remixed by Groove Armada, Deep Dish, Victor Calderone, Hex Hector, and Tracy Young; all of them were handpicked by Madonna since it was "more important to [her] that my records get played in the clubs. That's where I got my start, and that's where I will probably always feel most at home". Contemporary club music was inspiration behind the remixes with Calderone adding tribal beats and synths around Madonna's vocals. A house beat and bassline was used in Deep Dish's remix, while Hector utilized electro-skewed beats, guitar licks and breakbeat. Young's 13 minute remix used ambient interludes, house music rhythms, trance and 1970s music with Madonna's singing sounding fresh. Club DJs received the promotional remixes on August 2, 8 and 15, while they were released to retailers on August 22 in maxi-CD and double vinyl formats.

== Critical reception ==
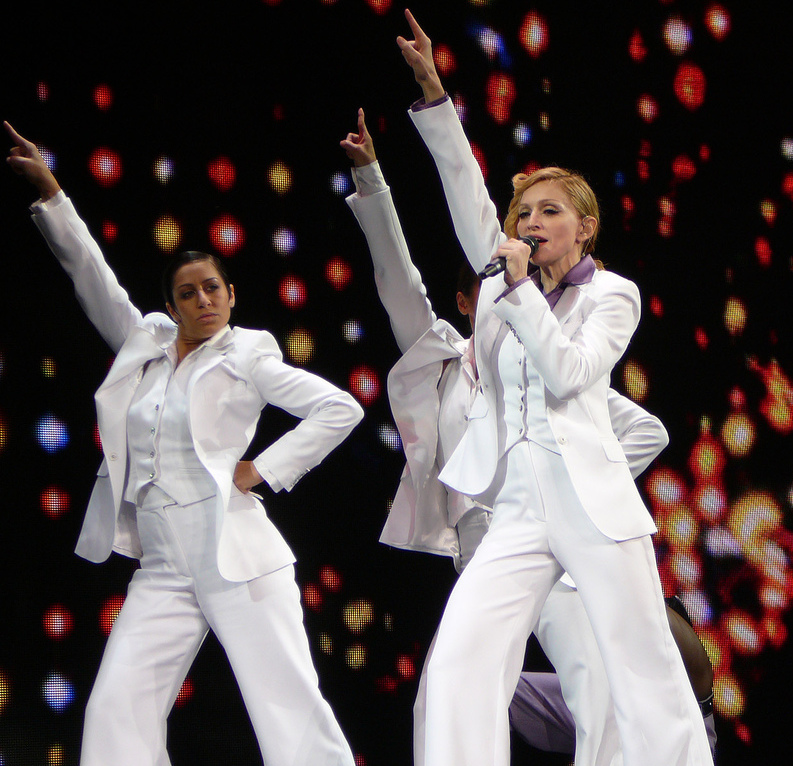
Madonna performing "Music Inferno", a mashup of "Music" and The Trammps's "Disco Inferno", during the Confessions Tour (2006)

Upon release, the song received generally positive reviews from critics. J. Randy Taraborrelli, author of Madonna: An Intimate Biography, declared "Music" as a dance-anthem "that reaches into the future but also slyly conjures images and feelings of the good ol' disco days". In a similar review, Lucy O'Brien, author of Madonna: Like an Icon, relegated the track as "a resurrection of the disco girl" image. She listed "Music" as a career-defining moment for Madonna, like previous singles "Vogue" and "Justify My Love" (both released in 1990). O'Brien clarified the song as "the same genre defining quality, robotic, tinny, trashy and audacious... She resurrects the Madonna imperative. Dance. Party. Surrender". Stephen Thomas Erlewine of AllMusic called it "a thumping track which sounds funkier, denser, sexier with each spin". Jim Farber of the New York Daily News gave a positive feedback, stating that it is "everything a single should be: pithy, simple and maddeningly catchy, her most instantly embraceable single since 'Holiday'". Farber also highlighted the lyrics, which he felt covered familiar ground for Madonna by talking about the power of dance music. This thought was shared by Fouz-Hernández, who believed that like her debut single "Everybody", "Music" defined Madonna's artistic credibility.

Reviewing the parent album for Rolling Stone, Barry Walters also compared it to Madonna's earlier work. Sal Cinquemani from Slant Magazine called it Madonna's best dance track since "Vogue", also comparing it to her 1985 single, "Into the Groove". In his review of Madonna's 2001 compilation GHV2, Cinquemani praised the single's "retro club beats and vintage synth sound". Giving it a B rating, he concluded that "only a former material girl living in a NASDAQ world could get away with a song like this". Dimitri Ehrlich from Vibe found "Music" to be "a bouncing parade of synthesizers that pose the question 'Do fortysomething baby-mamas still have the divine right to get down?' (The answer is yes)". Chuck Arnold from Entertainment Weekly, called it one of Madonna's "most eccentric hits ever" and found it to be reminiscent of her earlier works, specifically "Holiday".

Billboard's Chuck Taylor praised the song as a "stunning enterprise, a ballsy testament to [Madonna's] insistence on being a style-setter and one of the industry's most savvy—and now critically accountable—tunesmiths". He believed that both radio and the audience would be shocked with the experimentation Madonna achieved in the track. Larry Flick from the same publication described the song as "anthemic", also predicting a positive commercial reception. Another Billboard writer Joe Lynch highlighted that Madonna had successfully created a "surefire radio winner with cross-generational appeal", he also said the song was a "dancefloor call-to-arms boasting a faint patina of electroclash for the club kids, a throbbing techno beat for suburban ravers and enough old-school electro-funk that her middle-aged fans could still nod along". Ethan Brown, from New York magazine, stated that the song "elicits memories of past pop odes to dance culture", and praised its "giddy mix of electro-bounce, campy vocoder chants, and funky keyboard squeals". Charlotte Robinson of PopMatters believed that "Music"'s appeal lay in the "freewheeling, fun spirit" nature of Madonna, which had initially made her popular. However, she also called it a "goofy Rick James rip-off". For Medium's Richard LaBeau, "this bold and aggressive electro-funk song may not be particularly lyrically inspired but it is rightfully hailed as one of her finest and most unexpected hours".

Negative criticism came from The Guardian's Garry Mulholland, who described the track as "the sound of a bunch of middle-aged trend-watchers second-guessing what today's kids go for [...] the absolute definition of mutton-dressed-as-lamb middle-youth". Alex Pappademas from Spin, pointed out that "its dancefloor liberation mantra feels forced". Danny Eccleston from Q described the song as "daring gambit" and found that the track did not resemble any Madonna endeavor. He panned the over-usage of the electronic sounds and compared "Music" unfavorably to Daft Punk's "Around the World" (1997).

== Chart performance ==
"Music" topped the charts in 25 countries. Prior to the official release of the song, it started receiving airplay in US radios due to public demand, as noted by Paul Bryant, program director at WHTZ (Z100) station in New York. There was equal anticipation regarding retail sales of the track. On August 12, 2000, "Music" entered at number 41 on the Billboard Hot 100, becoming the second-highest debuting single based solely on radio play. Fred Bronson from Billboard noted that it was Madonna's highest-debuting single on the Hot 100 since "The Power of Good-Bye" entered at number 24 in October 1998. "Music" continued ascending up the Hot 100 and following the commercial release, it jumped from number 14 to number 2 on the chart dated September 9, 2000. The CD maxi and 12-inch vinyl sold a combined 62,500 copies. Silvio Pietroluongo from Billboard observed that only Madonna's "This Used to Be My Playground" single had debuted with more sales, 76,000 copies in August 1992.

The next week, "Music" sold a further 156,234 units and topped the Hot 100, replacing Janet Jackson's "Doesn't Really Matter". It was Madonna's 12th song to reach the summit, her first number-one single since "Take a Bow" in February 1995 and her most recent number one on the chart as of 2026. She tied the Supremes and moved to fifth rank among artists with most Hot 100 number-ones. The song amassed the highest weekly sales total and the highest points (23,110) for a song topping the chart. "Music" placed at number 17 on the Billboard Year-End Hot 100 singles of 2000. "Music" was certified platinum by the Recording Industry Association of America (RIAA), for shipment of over a million copies, and as of August 2009 had sold 1.136 million in physical CD sales, and an additional 217,000 in digital downloads. "Music" was the second highest selling physical single of the 2000s decade in the United States. Aided by the official remixes, the song also reached number-one on the Dance Club Play chart, remaining atop for five weeks. It was the top ranking Dance Club song of 2000 and the second most-successful Dance Club song of the 2000s decade in the United States, behind Madonna's own "Hung Up" (2005). In Canada, the song debuted at number 23 on the RPM 100 Hit Tracks chart and reached the top after five weeks. It became Madonna's 18th number-one hit in the nation, tying her with The Beatles as the artist with the most number-one hits in the country. It was present on top of the chart for a total of nine weeks and was the final song to remain atop the chart when RPM ceased publication in November 2000.

"Music" was also a success in Australia and New Zealand. The song debuted at number one on the ARIA Singles Chart, where it stayed for three consecutive weeks and a total of four weeks. It was the fourth best-selling single in the country and was certified double platinum by the Australian Recording Industry Association (ARIA) for shipment of 140,000 copies. In New Zealand, "Music" debuted at number 33 on the RIANZ Singles Chart and ascended to the top 10, finally peaking at number one on the week of October 1, 2000.

In the United Kingdom, "Music" debuted on the UK Singles Chart at number one with first-week sales of 115,000 copies. It faced tough competition with Spiller's "Groovejet (If This Ain't Love)" and beat the latter by 1,000 sales. Madonna became the first solo female artist to collect ten number-one singles. The song was present on the chart for 24 weeks, and was the 24th best selling release of 2000 in the country. The British Phonographic Industry (BPI) certified it gold in July 2013, and according to the Official Charts Company, "Music" is Madonna's 14th best-selling single and sold 510,000 units in the region as of August 2023. Making its debut at its peak position of number 8, "Music" charted for a total of 20 weeks in France, before falling out on January 6, 2001. On August 31, 2000, "Music" debuted at number two on the Swedish Singles Chart. Similarly in Switzerland, the song debuted at number one, and spent 21 weeks in the chart. The single's performance in the UK and Europe enabled it to debut atop the Eurochart Hot 100, with greatest gaining points on the radio and dance charts. It was present in the position for six weeks. In Italy, "Music" debuted at the top of the Musica e dischi chart, spending seven weeks at number one, six of which were consecutive.

== Music video ==
=== Conception and filming ===
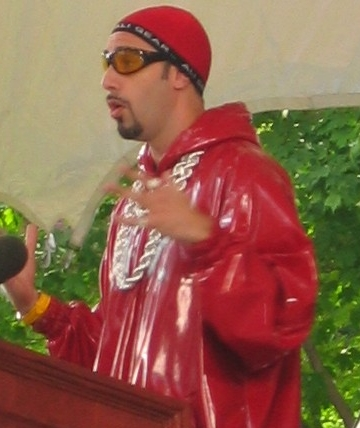
Comedian Sacha Baron Cohen appeared in the music video as his character, Ali G (pictured above).

The accompanying music video was directed by Jonas Åkerlund, who had previously helmed Madonna's "Ray of Light" clip in 1998. It stars Madonna, her longtime backup singer Niki Haris and her friend, actress Debi Mazar, as well as comedian Sacha Baron Cohen as his famous character Ali G. Madonna became a fan of the comedian after watching his Christmas special, Ali G, Innit (1999). When the video was planned Madonna thought that Baron Cohen "would be great in it", although it was confirmed that he was not going to be involved in the musical aspects. Åkerlund stated that originally they intended to have American comedian Chris Rock in the video. Since Baron Cohen was not known in the US at that time, the director showed everyone clips from Da Ali G Show so they could see the Ali G character.

When we did the 'Music' video, it was a weird time. [Madonna] was pregnant and we didn't want her to look pregnant—so we had to work around that. We had an idea to do a fun party video with her and her girls, make it a little bling and cowboy hats and all that. We wanted to have some comedy in there and I wanted to do some animation.

The video was shot in Los Angeles, California in April 2000, to accommodate Madonna's pregnancy and her then-growing waistline. Crew members were asked to sign confidentiality documents for the filming. Madonna conceptualized the clip, wanting to show her take on the stereotypical R&B and rap music videos. She wanted to do role reversals with females enacting characters generally reserved for males. However, her range was limited being pregnant so she "had to think of a concept that would incorporate me being almost a voyeur rather than the central force in the video. So I figured if I played this kind of mack-daddy/pimp character, where things just came to me, happened to me and happened around me while I was watching it all happen, I could kill two birds with one stone."

Madonna's look in the clip was described by O'Brien as a "ghetto-fabulous female in a feather boa and stetson; all diamonds and bling, going to lapdancing bars and travelling in the back of a luxury limousine". She had initially enlisted some actors to portray her accompaniments in the video, but she did not feel comfortable with their stiffness, their model-like appearance and lack of personality. So she called up Mazar and Harris to come and star in the video. "I was at home when Madonna called me. She said 'I need my girlfriend, not these fake girl-friends trying to be my girlfriends. Throw on some clothes and come down'", recalled Harris. Ali G kept entertaining everyone in the set with Madonna not being able to "keep a straight face" during her takes. She kept her coat shut all the time and had to sit in the limousine to hide her belly.

=== Release and reception ===
Madonna (center) with singer Niki Haris (right) and actress Debi Mazar (left) in the music video

The music video debuted on MTV and VH1 on August 2, 2000. VH1 channel aired a special hour-long program, Madonna's Music, in which Madonna called in for a phone interview. It was hosted by VH1's Rebecca Rankin who presided a discussion with Rolling Stone music critic Joe Levy about Madonna and her looks, as well as a video interview with Mazar and Harris. VH1 also aired a countdown of Madonna's previous videos and offered its viewers to listen to a remix of "Music". In addition, about 700 Madonna fans saw a free preview of the video at New York City's Irving Plaza a few days before the premiere.

The clip starts with Madonna and her friends getting into a limousine, driven by Ali G. As the music starts Ali G is directed to take them to a club where Madonna and her friends dance and drink. He later takes them to a strip-club, where Madonna goes inside but he is denied entrance. An animated section (animated by Filmtecknarna) follows where Madonna, as a superhero character with superpowers, flies above rooftops, swims underwater (swimming past a school of fish with Ali G's face), and works as a DJ at a club with a dozen arms like a Hindu deity. Madonna's animated character also attacks various neon signs displaying the names of her previous singles. The video ends with Madonna and her friends traveling in the limousine packed with the strippers and Ali G engaging in a rendezvous with them. According to author Georges Claude Guilbert, throughout the clip Madonna wears a gold necklace around her neck that says "Mommy", a reference to her apparent pregnancy. In the extended version of the music video, there is a variation at the end of the animated section. Ali G briefly interrupts the song to demonstrate his rap skills to persuade Madonna to include him on her next single. An annoyed Madonna asks him to stop and to turn the song back on.

Jarman-Ivens noted the use of American imagery in the clip, especially Madonna's cowboy garb and her popularizing of cowboy fashion. She found it interesting that Madonna "turned" to Americana, "underlining her interest in exploring her relationship to mainstream America through a fashion and cultural style that is rich and multi-layered in its meaning". The author also emphasized Madonna's sexual assertiveness in the music video, and emphatic defining of herself as "a sexual free spirit", as well as portrayal of expensive accouterments. "Music" was released as a DVD single on September 5, 2000. It reached the top of the UK Music Video charts and number three on the US Music Video charts, receiving gold certification in both regions. The clip was parodied on the sixth season of Mad TV. The spoof, called "My Movies", featured Mo Collins as Madonna and poked fun at her commercially unsuccessful films, with an animated version of Madonna attacking the movies' posters. In 2009, the video was included on Madonna's compilation, Celebration: The Video Collection.

== Accolades and recognition ==
"Music" earned two nominations at the 43rd Annual Grammy Awards, in the categories of Record of the Year and Best Female Pop Vocal Performance. It also won the ASCAP Awards in the categories of Most Performed Pop Songs and Top Dance Songs. The video won several awards, including "Best Pop Clip of the Year" at the 2000 Billboard Music Video Awards and "Best Dance Video" at the International Dance Music Awards in 2000. At the Danish Music Awards it won the trophy of Best International Hit. The 2000 MTV Europe Music Awards nominated the track in the category of Best Song. "Music" also received a nomination at the 2001 TEC Awards, for its record production, and International Song of the Year at the 2001 NRJ Music Award.

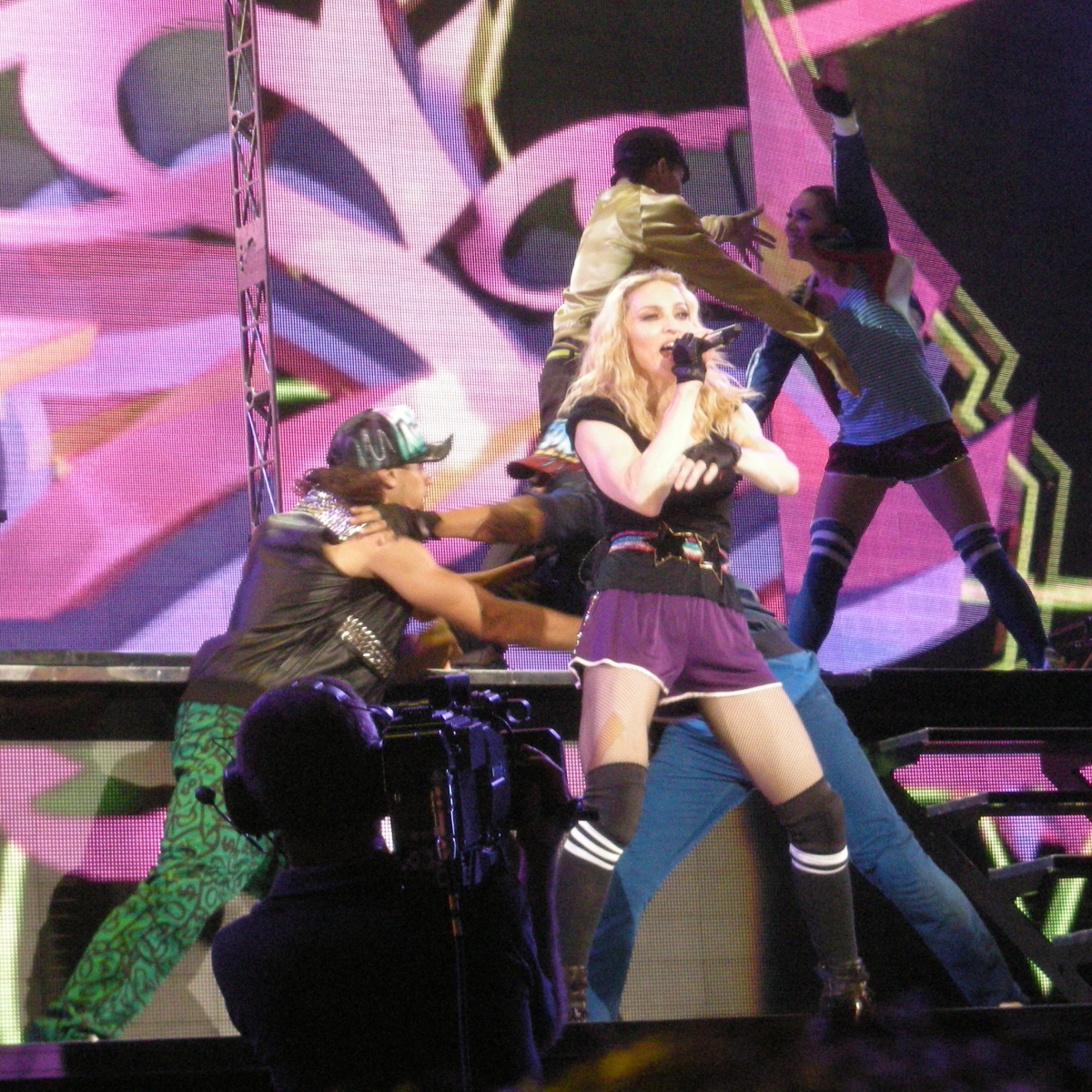
Madonna performing "Music" on the Sticky & Sweet Tour (2008–09)

"Music" has been included in many critic lists for Madonna's top singles and is often ranked as one of the best songs of the 2000s. Dotmusic placed it within its top-ten singles for 2000. In 2003, Q Magazine ranked the song at number 778 in their list of the "1001 Best Songs Ever". Rolling Stone listed "Music" as the 66th best of the 2000s decade, commenting that "despite all the new pop starlets out there trying to jump her train, Madonna definitely [is] not slackening pace. When she dropped 'Music', she was older than Britney and Christina combined, yet she took them to school with vintage electro-boom, Eurodisco flourishes from French producer Mirwais, and her own inimitable sass." The publication also ranked it at number nine on their list of Madonna's 50 Greatest Songs, writing that "After years spent making albums that bridged boundaries of race, gender and sexual orientation, Madonna finally wrote a tune explicitly devoted to the democratizing power of music itself." HuffPost's Matthew Jacobs ranked it at number 11 on his list "The Definitive Ranking Of Madonna Singles". Jacobs believed that the phrase "Hey Mr. DJ" gave rise to the usage of name-checking in songs thereafter, employed by other artists like Jennifer Lopez, Black Eyed Peas and Mariah Carey.

In 2011, VH1 created a countdown of the top songs of 2000 decade and placed "Music" at number 28. Entertainment Weekly likewise ranked "Music" at number seven on their list of Madonna's 35 top singles, saying that the "message [in the song] is universal". Michael Roffman from Consequence of Sound listed the track at number 15, feeling that the commercial reception to the release of "Music" was "almost meta come to think of it; the song did make people come together". Enio Chola of PopMatters placed "Music" at number five in his list of The Top 15 Madonna Singles of All Time, feeling that "After the confessional Ray of Light, Madonna was ready to dance again, and like no one else can, she proved that her ability to write pure unadulterated mega pop hits was still in full form as she began the third decade of her music career." LA Weekly's Michael Cooper ranked the track at number 12 in his list of Madonna's Top 20 Singles. He opined that Ahmadzaï's production of the track "[helped] to cement Madonna as the queen of reinvention". Ed Masley of The Arizona Republic placed it at number 13 on his Essential Madonna playlist. Writing for The Guardian, Jude Rogers listed "Music" at number 10 on her ranking of Madonna's singles, in honor of her 60th birthday. Similarly, Entertainment Weekly listed it as her seventh best single.

== Live performances ==
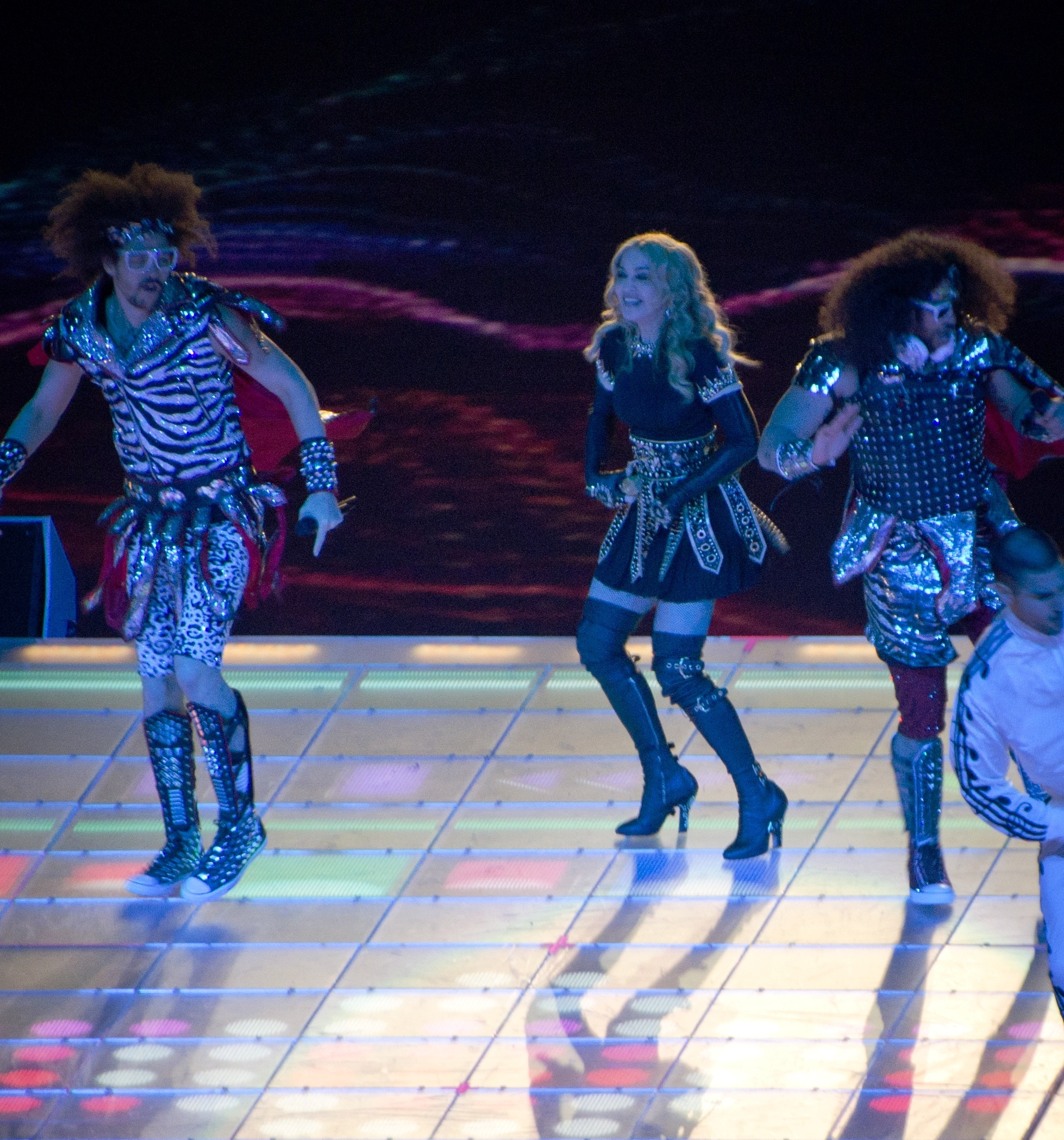
Madonna and LMFAO performing a mash-up of "Music" and "Sexy and I Know it" at the Super Bowl XLVI halftime show on February 5, 2012

The first live performance of "Music" took place during the promotional concerts for the album, held on November 5, 2000, at New York City's Roseland Ballroom, and on November 29 at London's Brixton Academy. During the New York performance, she wore a black tank top with "Britney Spears" written on it, along with cowboy hats and boots. For the London performance, Madonna wore a different T-shirt, with the names of her son Rocco and daughter Lourdes printed on it. On November 16, 2000, Madonna performed "Music" during the MTV Europe Music Awards 2000. She was introduced by Ali G as "Maradona" and wore a tank top with "Kylie Minogue" printed on it. A day later, she later performed "Music" and "Don't Tell Me" on British television program Top of The Pops and one week later on French television program Nulle Part Ailleurs.

On February 21, 2001, Madonna opened the 43rd Grammy Awards with a performance of the track. The stage had five giant video screens, which showed clippings from her career. Madonna entered the stage in a Cadillac driven by rapper Bow Wow. She emerged dressed in a full-length fur coat, which she removed to reveal a tight leather jacket and jeans. She took off the jacket to reveal a black tank top with the words "Material Girl" and performed the song, joined by backup singers Niki Haris and Donna De Lory. For the Drowned World Tour in the same year, "Music" was used as the final encore. Madonna wore tight black jeans and a customized Dolce & Gabbana halter top that proclaimed "Mother" in the front and "F*cker" in the back. She sang the song surrounded by her dancers, while images from her past music videos were displayed on the backdrops. This performance is also famous for Madonna's ability to do 15 squats without stopping; this later became a fitness trend on social media dubbed the "Madonna Squats Challenge". In his review, NME's Alex Needham commented that the performance "underlines how easily [Madonna] could have brought the audience to collective orgasm by simply reeling out her classics". The performance on August 26, 2001, at The Palace of Auburn Hills was recorded and released in the live video album, Drowned World Tour 2001.

"Music" was later added to the Re-Invention World Tour of 2004. Set to a slower, hip-hop inspired remix, the performance featured Madonna and her dancers wearing Scottish kilts and a lighted staircase surrounding a DJ Station. At the end, Madonna and her dancers lifted up their kilts to spell the word "FREEDOM", with glitter letters on their underpants. MTV's Corey Moss opined that during the performance "Madonna and her dancers transformed the arena into a steamy nightclub". The next year, Madonna performed "Music" at the Live 8 benefit concert in London. On the 2006 Confessions Tour, Madonna performed "Music Inferno", a mashup of "Music" and The Trammps's "Disco Inferno". It began with several dancers on roller skates emerging from beneath the stage to perform "Xanadu-worthy tricks", while the stage was bathed in deep red lights. Madonna appeared wearing a white suit and performed the track; the performance also included a sample from her song "Where's The Party", from her third studio album True Blue (1986), at the beginning. Halfway through the performance, Madonna walked to the center stage where, according to MTV's Corey Moss, she did "her best Saturday Night Fever-era John Travolta routine, complete with the 'hitchhike' (you know, thumbs to the side)". The performance of the song at the August 15–16, 2006 shows in London, at the Wembley Arena, were recorded and included on Madonna's second live album, The Confessions Tour (2007).

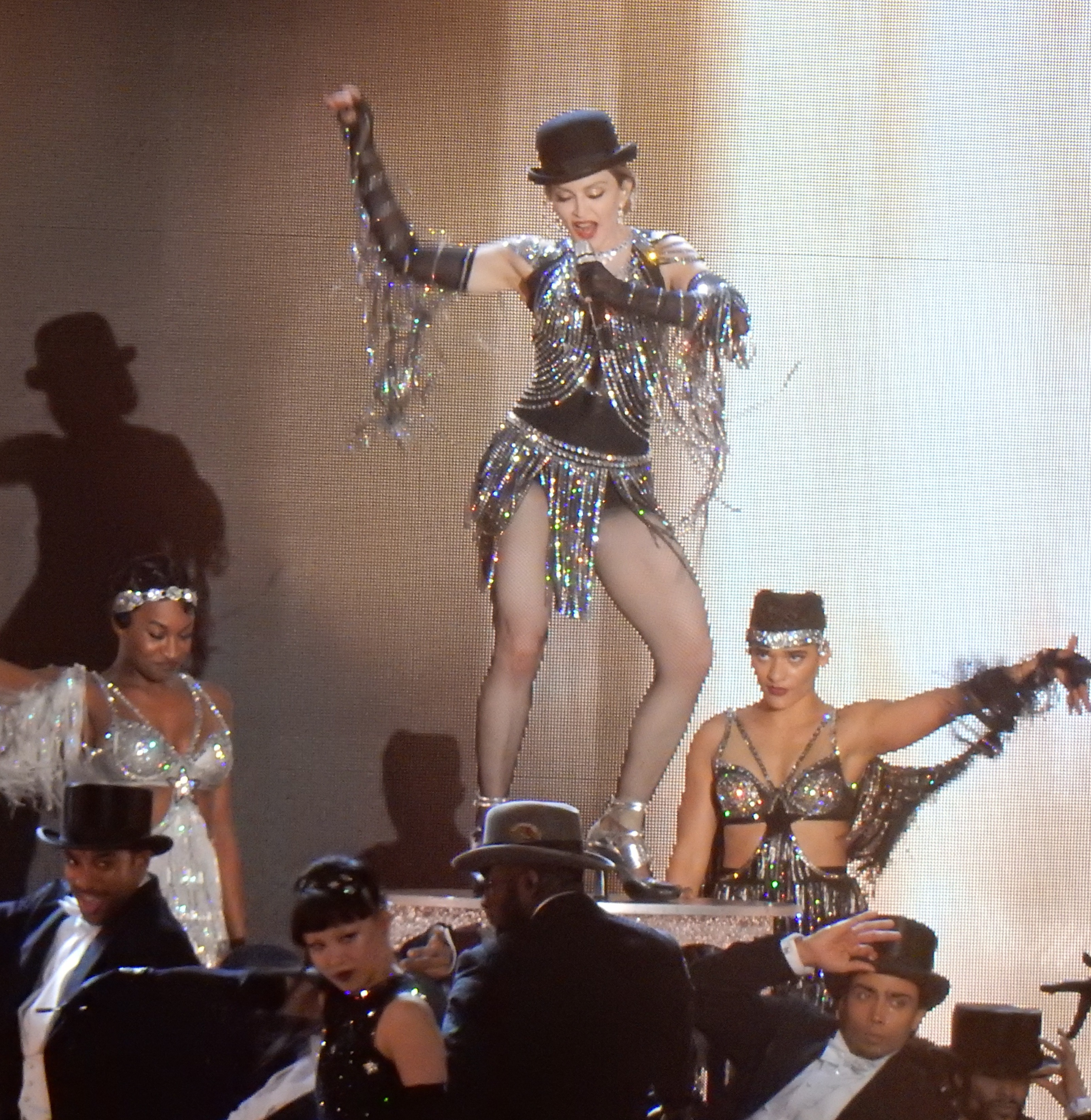
Madonna performing a jazz-themed version of "Music" during the Rebel Heart Tour (2015–2016)

"Music" was the closing song on the Hard Candy Promo Tour. Madonna wore a skintight black suit and a lace top, and began the performance by singing the song at the very front of the stage a cappella, before all her dancers joined. It ended with Madonna racing up the stage to the subway doors, behind which she disappeared. It was also included as the last song of the Old School segment of her Sticky & Sweet Tour (2008–09), where Madonna performed the same version as the promotional tour, but sampling Indeep's "Last Night A DJ Saved My Life" at the beginning as well as mashing it up with Fedde le Grand's "Put Your Hands Up 4 Detroit"; the backdrop screens depicting a graffiti-splattered New York City Subway train. Madonna's outfit, a pair of gym shorts with long socks and sneakers, was a reference to her old days in New York. The performance of the song at River Plate Stadium of Buenos Aires, Argentina, was recorded and released on the live CD-DVD album, Sticky & Sweet Tour (2010).

In 2012, Madonna included the song on her Super Bowl XLVI halftime show set list, where it was remixed with LMFAO's "Party Rock Anthem" and "Sexy and I Know It". The same year, she performed it on The MDNA Tour at New York City's Madison Square Garden, on November 13. She invited South Korean rapper Psy and performed together his song "Gangnam Style" and her 2008 single, "Give It 2 Me". "Music" opened the final section of the Rebel Heart Tour (2015–2016), with Madonna decked in a "Harlem-flapper-meets-Paris-in-the-Twenties" dress, adorned with thousands of Swarovski crystals. The song "began as a Jazz Age ballad before kicking into banger mode". Madonna's dancers were dressed in Golden Twenties inspired costumes with one of them topless. Joe Lynch from Billboard, opined that "the presence of 'Music' was an effective reminder that while some compulsive naysayers tsk the Queen of Pop for trend chasing with Diplo, she brought techno to the pop mainstream years before EDM was an ubiquitous term". The performance of the song at the March 19–20, 2016 shows in Sydney's Allphones Arena was recorded and released in the live album, Rebel Heart Tour. On December 6, 2016, Madonna performed "Music" during the Carpool Karaoke segment of The Late Late Show with James Corden.

On April 30, 2022, Madonna joined singer Maluma during his Medallo en el mapa concert in Medellín, Colombia to perform "Music" along with their 2019 single "Medellín". The song's refrain was also incorporated into the encore of Madonna's The Celebration Tour in 2023. The full version of the song was also included on the final show of the Celebration Tour, on Copacabana Beach for Todo Mundo no Rio. The rendition featured samba music, elements of her Madame X song "Faz Gostoso" and the crew dressed in the Brazil flag with Madonna and Pabllo Vittar dancing together on stage. On July 19, 2026, Madonna gave the partly pre-recorded performance of the song during the 2026 FIFA World Cup final halftime show at the MetLife Stadium in East Rutherford, New Jersey, where she was joined by former soccer players Ronaldo and Ronaldinho.

== Cover versions and media appearance ==
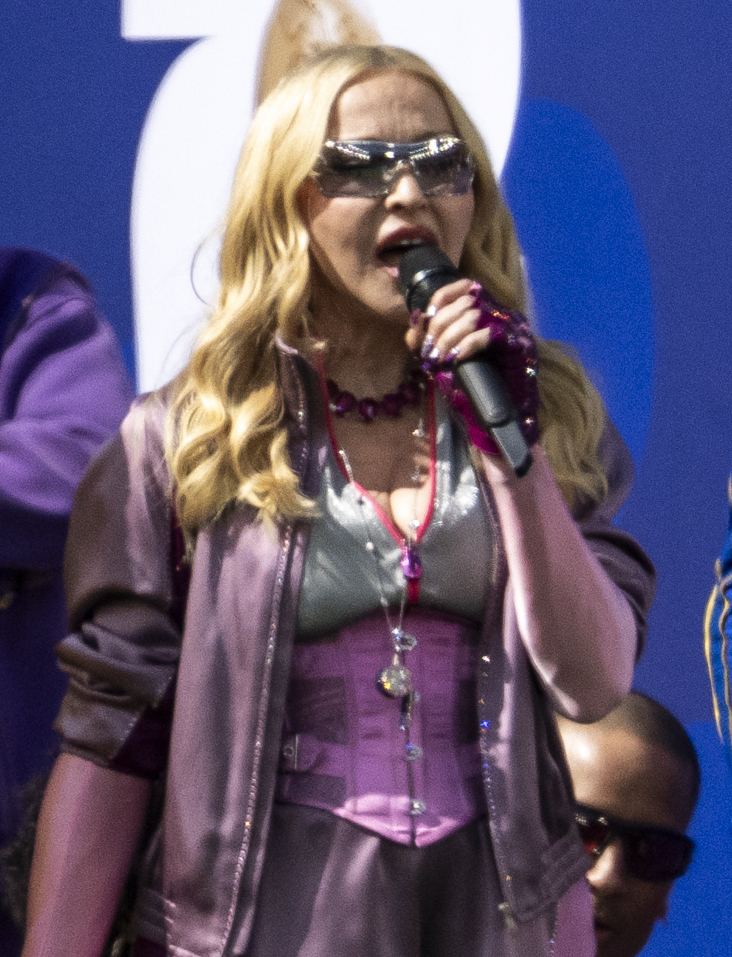
Madonna performing "Music" during the 2026 FIFA World Cup final halftime show

In 2004, Canadian tech-metal band Out of Your Mouth released a cover version of "Music" as their debut single. Vocalist Jason Darr commented, "I absolutely love her, I've bought her records and when she came out with that song it was like I was hit over the head with it". In 2007, The Dynamics recorded and released an eight-minute reggae cover on their album Versions Excursions. David Dacks from Exclaim! was satisfied with the recording, saying that it "fares well too, with the lyrics adapting well to a reggae context". French metal band Eths added a cover of the song as a bonus track on their third studio album III (2012). In addition, remixed Eurodance cover versions of the song have appeared on the Dancemania series albums, including an uptempo cover remix by Nancy and the Boys on the 2001 album Dancemania Speed 6. In 2021, Miley Cyrus covered the song for her Peacock television special Miley Cyrus Presents Stand by You.

"Music" was featured during the ninth season of American reality competition series, RuPaul's Drag Race. It was used as the lip-sync song for the sixth episode, between contestants Peppermint and Cynthia Lee Fontaine, with the former winning the round. The runway that week was themed around Madonna's iconic looks. Madonna herself referenced "Music" in her 13th studio album, Rebel Heart (2015), in the track "Veni Vidi Vici" by singing the line: "I saw a Ray of Light / Music saved my life".

In September 2026, Troye Sivan released the single "Party", which interpolates and samples "Music".

== Formats and track listings ==
- US 7-inch vinyl; Canadian & US 2-track CD single; US cassette single
1. "Music" (Album Version) – 3:44
2. "Cyberraga" – 5:31
- Benelux and French 2-track CD single
1. "Music" (Album Version) – 3:44
2. "Music" (Groove Armada 7" Edit) – 3:38
- Canadian, European and Japanese CD maxi-single
1. "Music" (Album Version) – 3:44
2. "Music" (Groove Armada 7" Edit) – 3:38
3. "Music" (Calderone Radio Edit) – 4:25
4. "Music" (Deep Dish Dot Com Radio Edit) – 4:15
- European and UK CD maxi-single 1
1. "Music" (Album Version) – 3:44
2. "Music" (Deep Dish Dot Com UK Radio Edit) – 4:15
3. "Music" (Calderone Anthem Mix) – 11:55
- European and UK CD maxi-single 2
1. "Music" (Album Version) – 3:44
2. "Music" (Groove Armada BA 12" Mix) – 5:30
3. "Music" (Deep Dish Dot Com US Edit) – 4:29
- Canadian, Japanese and US CD maxi-single; digital download (2020)
1. "Music" (HQ2 Club Mix) – 8:50
2. "Music" (Calderone Anthem Mix) – 11:55
3. "Music" (Deep Dish Dot Com Remix) – 11:21
4. "Music" (Groove Armada Club Mix) – 9:29
5. "Music" (The Young Collective Club Mix) – 13:16
6. "Music" (HQ2 Radio Mix) – 4:07
7. "Music" (Calderone Radio Edit) – 4:25
8. "Music" (Deep Dish Dot Com Radio Edit) – 4:15
9. "Music" (Groove Armada 12" Mix) – 5:30
- Australian CD maxi-single 1; Asian CD maxi-single
1. "Music" (Album Version) – 3:44
2. "Music" (Deep Dish Dot Com UK Radio Mix) – 3:59
3. "Music" (Groove Armada 7" Edit) – 3:38
4. "Music" (Deep Dish Dot Com Remix) – 11:21
5. "Music" (Groove Armada GA 12" Mix) – 5:30
6. "Music" (Groove Armada Bonus Beats) – 4:51
7. "Music" (Groove Armada Club Mix) – 9:29
8. "Music" (Video) – 4:36
- Australian CD maxi-single 2
1. "Music" (Album Version) – 3:44
2. "Music" (Calderone Radio Edit) – 4:25
3. "Music" (HQ2 7" Mix) – 3:59
4. "Music" (The Young Collective Radio Mix) – 3:48
5. "Music" (Calderone Anthem Mix) – 11:55
6. "Music" (HQ2 Club Mix) – 8:50
7. "Music" (The Young Collective Club Mix) – 13:16
- European and UK 12-inch vinyl 1 and 12-inch picture disc
1. "Music" (Deep Dish Dot Com Remix) – 11:21
2. "Music" (Album Version) – 3:44
3. "Music" (Groove Armada Club Mix) – 9:29
4. "Music" (Groove Armada GA 12" Mix) – 5:30
- European and UK 12-inch vinyl 2
1. "Music" (Calderone Anthem Mix) – 11:55
2. "Music" (HQ2 Main 12" Mix) – 8:50
3. "Music" (The Young Collective Club Mix) – 13:16
4. "Music" (Deep Dish Dot Com Remix US Edit) – 4:29
- US 2× 12-inch vinyl

A1. "Music" (HQ2 Club Mix) – 8:50
A2. "Music" (Groove Armada 12" Mix) – 5:30
B1. "Music" (Calderone Anthem Mix) – 11:55
B2. "Music" (Album Version) – 3:44
C1. "Music" (Deep Dish Dot Com Remix) – 11:21
D1. "Music" (The Young Collective Club Remix) – 13:16

- UK cassette single
1. "Music" (Album Version) – 3:44
2. "Music" (Groove Armada 7" Edit) – 3:38
- European and Japanese DVD single
1. "Music" (Video - Short Version) – 4:26
2. "Music" (Video - Long Version) – 4:44
- US DVD single
1. "Music" (Video - Long Version) – 4:44
2. "Music" (Video - Short Version) – 4:26

== Credits and personnel ==
Credits are adapted from the liner notes of the CD single and Music.

=== Management ===
- Recorded at Sarm West Studios, Notting Hill, London
- Mixed at Olympic Studios, London
- Mastered at Metropolis Studios, London
- Managed by Caresse Henry for Caliente Management
- Webo Girl Publishing, Inc., Warner Bros. Music Corp (ASCAP), 1000 Lights Music Ltd, Warner-Tamerlane Publishing Corp. (BMI)

=== Personnel ===
- Madonna – songwriter, producer, vocals
- Mirwais Ahmadzaï – songwriter, producer, programming, guitar, keyboard
- Keeling Lee – additional guitar
- Jonathan 'Stan' White – bass guitar
- Patrick Dawes – percussion
- Mark "Spike" Stent – mixing
- Jake Davies – engineer
- Mark Endert – engineer
- Kevin Reagan – art direction, design
- Matthew Lindauer – design
- Jean-Baptiste Mondino – photography

== Charts ==
=== Weekly charts ===
Weekly chart performance for "Music"
Chart (2000–2001)	Peak position
Australia (ARIA)	1
Austria (Ö3 Austria Top 40)	5
Belgium (Ultratop 50 Flanders)	6
Belgium (Ultratop 50 Wallonia)	4
Canada Top Singles (RPM)	1
Canada (Nielsen SoundScan)	1
Canada CHR (Nielsen BDS)	1
Canada Adult Contemporary (RPM)	17
Canada Dance/Urban (RPM)	3
Costa Rica (El Siglo de Torreón)	2
Croatia International Airplay (HRT)	5
Czech Republic (IFPI)	1
Denmark (Tracklisten)	2
Europe (Eurochart Hot 100)	1
European Radio Top 50 (Music & Media)	1
Finland (Suomen virallinen lista)	2
France (SNEP)	8
France Airplay (SNEP)	1
Germany (GfK)	2
Greece (IFPI)	1
Hungary (Mahasz)	1
Hungary Airplay (Heti Scucs)	2
Iceland (Íslenski Listinn Topp 40)	1
Ireland (IRMA)	7
Italy (FIMI)	1
Italy Airplay (Music & Media)	1
Japan (Oricon Singles Chart)	86
Japan International (Oricon)	1
Netherlands (Dutch Top 40)	4
Netherlands (Single Top 100)	4
Netherlands Airplay (Music & Media)	9
New Zealand (Recorded Music NZ)	1
Norway (VG-lista)	1
Poland Airplay (Music & Media)	3
Poland Airplay (ZPAV)	1
Portugal (AFP)	1
Romania (Romanian Top 100)	1
Scottish Singles Sales (Official Charts)	2
Singapore (SPVA)	5
Spain (Promusicae)	1
Spain Airplay (Music & Media)	4
Sweden (Sverigetopplistan)	2
Switzerland (Schweizer Hitparade)	1
UK Singles (Official Charts)	1
UK Airplay (Music & Media)	2
UK Music Videos (Official Charts)	1
Uruguay (Notimex)	6
US Billboard Hot 100	1
US Adult Pop Airplay (Billboard)	16
US Dance Club Songs (Billboard)	1
US Dance Singles Sales (Billboard)	1
US Music Video Sales (Billboard)	3
US Pop Airplay (Billboard)	2
US Rhythmic Airplay (Billboard)	9

=== Year-end charts ===
2000 year-end chart performance for "Music"
Chart (2000)	Position
Australia (ARIA)	4
Belgium (Ultratop 50 Flanders)	45
Belgium (Ultratop 50 Wallonia)	21
Brazil (Crowley)	8
Denmark (IFPI)	14
Europe (Eurochart Hot 100)	15
France (SNEP)	26
Germany (Media Control)	30
Iceland (Íslenski Listinn Topp 40)	21
Ireland (IRMA)	56
Italy (FIMI)	7
Netherlands (Dutch Top 40)	30
Netherlands (Single Top 100)	40
New Zealand (RIANZ)	49
Norway Summer Period (VG-lista)	6
Romania (Romanian Top 100)	2
Spain (AFYVE)	1
Sweden (Hitlistan)	32
Switzerland (Schweizer Hitparade)	19
UK Singles (OCC)	24
US Billboard Hot 100	17
US Dance Club Play (Billboard)	1
US Maxi-Singles Sales (Billboard)	1

2001 year-end chart performance for "Music"
Chart (2001)	Position
Canada (Nielsen SoundScan)	34
US Maxi-Singles Sales (Billboard)	4

2002 year-end chart performance for "Music"
Chart (2002)	Position
Canada (Nielsen SoundScan)	103

=== Decade-end charts ===
Decade-end chart performance for "Music"
Chart (2000–2009)	Position
US Dance Club Songs (Billboard)	2

== Certifications ==
Certifications and sales for "Music"
Region	Certification	Certified units/sales
Australia (ARIA)	2× Platinum	140,000^{^}
Australia (ARIA) Video	Gold	7,500^{^}
Belgium (BRMA)	Gold	25,000^{*}
Brazil (Pro-Música Brasil) Digital	Gold	30,000^{*}
Denmark	—	8,178
France (SNEP)	Gold	250,000^{*}
Germany (BVMI)	Gold	250,000^{^}
Japan	—	2,350
Mexico	—	20,000
Sweden (GLF)	Platinum	30,000^{^}
Switzerland (IFPI Switzerland)	Gold	25,000^{^}
United Kingdom (BPI)	Gold	510,000
United Kingdom (BPI) Video	Gold	25,000^{^}
United States (RIAA)	Platinum	1,353,000 (Note: In the US, "Music" has sold 1,136,000 physical units, and 217,000 digital units, bringing its sales total to 1,353,000.)
United States (RIAA) Video	Gold	50,000^{^}
^{*} Sales figures based on certification alone.^{^} Shipments figures based on certification alone.

== Release history ==
Release dates and formats for "Music"
Region	Date	Format(s)	Label(s)	Ref.
United States	August 1, 2000	Radio airplay	Maverick; Warner Bros.	
Australia	August 19, 2000	Maxi CD (Note: In Australia and the UK, "Music" was made available in two maxi CD variants.)	Warner Music	
United Kingdom	August 21, 2000	12-inch vinyl; maxi CD	Maverick	
France	August 22, 2000	CD; maxi CD	Maverick	
United States	August 22, 2000	12-inch vinyl; maxi CD	Maverick; Warner Bros.	
United States	August 29, 2000	7-inch vinyl; cassette; CD	Maverick; Warner Bros.	
Various	September 5, 2000	DVD	Maverick; Warner Bros.	
Japan	September 6, 2000	DVD; maxi CD	Warner Music	

== See also ==
- List of number-one singles of 2000 (Australia)
- List of number-one singles of 2000 (Canada)
- List of European number-one hits of 2000
- List of number-one hits of 2000 (Italy)
- List of number-one songs in Norway
- List of number-one singles from the 2000s (New Zealand)
- List of number-one singles in Poland
- List of Romanian Top 100 number ones of the 2000s
- List of number-one singles of 2000 (Spain)
- List of number-one singles of the 2000s (Switzerland)
- List of Billboard Hot 100 number-one singles of 2000
- List of number-one dance singles of 2000 (U.S.)
- List of UK Singles Chart number ones of the 2000s
