= Bling Bling (disambiguation) =

Bling Bling is slang for flashy, ostentatious, or elaborate jewelry and ornamented accessories.

Bling Bling may also refer to:

- "Bling Bling" (song), 1999 song by B.G.
- Bling Bling (video), 2001 DVD by fictional character Ali G
- Bling! Bling!, 2003 album by Lynam
- Bling Bling (EP), 2011 EP by Dal Shabet
- Bling, Bling, an episode from American animation Shimmer and Shine
- Bling Bling, a song from iKon's 2016 album New Kids: Begin
- Bling Bling, the former name for the 2006 video game Saints Row.
