= Clifford Bañagale =

Filipino-American actor

Clifford Bañagale is a Filipino-American actor who is best known for his role as Diesel in the movie Brüno. His career started at age seven when he started training in opera, then acting in Equity theatre as an adult.

Not long after graduating from The American Musical and Dramatic Academy, Clifford landed roles in various local and regional productions of Peter Pan, South Pacific, It's a Wonderful Life and The Magical Land of OZ.

In 2009 he starred in the stage play Altar Boyz the Musical. The musical was nominated for four awards by the L.A. Weekly Theater Awards, winning Best Ensemble Cast and Best Choreography.

In 2013, he appeared in the finale of the American version of The Office with the role of 'Filipino Teen'.
