= Ali G, Innit =

- Directed by: James Bobin; Steve Smith
- Written by: Sacha Baron Cohen
- Produced by: Dan Mazer
- Starring: Sacha Baron Cohen
- Production companies: Channel 4 Video; Talkback
- Distributed by: Video Collection International
- Release date: 15 November 1999 (VHS)
- Running time: 89 minutes
- Country: United Kingdom
- Language: English

Ali G, Innit is a Direct-to-Video compilation programme containing Ali G's interview segments from The 11 O'Clock Show as well as footage not broadcast. It is hosted by Ali G himself.

== Contents ==
1. Welcome
2. The Law
3. Wales
4. Education
5. The Countryside
6. The Military
7. Religion
8. Northern Ireland
9. Women
10. Joining Europe
11. Art
12. Culture
13. Censorship
14. Class
15. The Alternative Health Service
16. Science
17. Royalty
18. Fashion
19. Socialism
20. The Environment
