= 2009 MTV Movie Awards =

Annual film awards

- Date: Sunday, May 31, 2009
- Location: Gibson Amphitheatre, Universal City, California
- Country: United States
- Hosted by: Andy Samberg

Television/radio coverage
- Network: MTV
- Produced by: Mark Burnett
- Directed by: Joe DeMaio

The 2009 MTV Movie Awards were presented on Sunday, May 31, 2009, at the Gibson Amphitheatre in Universal City, California. Andy Samberg served as host for the 18th annual ceremony.

== Performers ==
- Eminem — "We Made You" and "Crack a Bottle"
- Kings of Leon — "Use Somebody"

== Presenters ==
- Anna Faris and Chris Pine — presented Breakthrough Female
- Michael Bay and Megan Fox — introduced an exclusive Transformers: Revenge of the Fallen sneak preview
- Shia LaBeouf — presented Best Fight
- Bradley Cooper, Ed Helms, Justin Bartha, and Taraji P. Henson — introduced Eminem
- Jonah Hill and Vanessa Hudgens — presented Breakthrough Male
- Sacha Baron Cohen as Bruno Gehard — presented Best Male Performance
- Daniel Radcliffe, Rupert Grint, and Emma Watson — introduced an exclusive Harry Potter and the Half-Blood Prince sneak preview
- Sandra Bullock and Ryan Reynolds — presented Best Kiss
- Big Pak and Hayden Panettiere — presented Best WTF Moment
- Leighton Meester and Lil' Wayne — presented Best Song From a Movie
- Robert Pattinson, Kristen Stewart, and Taylor Lautner — introduced an exclusive The Twilight Saga: New Moon sneak preview
- Kiefer Sutherland, Triumph the Insult Comic Dog, and Zac Efron — presented the MTV Generation Award
- Cameron Diaz, Sofia Vassilieva, and Abigail Breslin — presented Best Female Performance
- Sienna Miller and Channing Tatum — introduced Kings of Leon
- Danny McBride and Will Ferrell — presented Best Comedic Performance
- Denzel Washington — presented Best Movie

== Awards ==
Below are the list of nominations. Winners are listed first and highlighted in bold.

Best Movie
**Twilight**; Iron Man; The Dark Knight; High School Musical 3: Senior Year; Slumdog Millionaire
Best Male Performance	Best Female Performance
**Zac Efron – High School Musical 3: Senior Year**; Christian Bale – The Dark Knight; Robert Downey Jr. – Iron Man; Shia LaBeouf – Eagle Eye; Vin Diesel – Fast & Furious	**Kristen Stewart – Twilight**; Angelina Jolie – Wanted; Anne Hathaway – Bride Wars; Kate Winslet – The Reader; Taraji P. Henson – The Curious Case of Benjamin Button
Breakthrough Performance – Male	Breakthrough Performance – Female
**Robert Pattinson – Twilight**; Ben Barnes – The Chronicles of Narnia: Prince Caspian; Bobb'e J. Thompson – Role Models; Dev Patel – Slumdog Millionaire; Taylor Lautner – Twilight	**Ashley Tisdale – High School Musical 3: Senior Year**; Amanda Seyfried – Mamma Mia!; Freida Pinto – Slumdog Millionaire; Kat Dennings – Nick and Norah's Infinite Playlist; Miley Cyrus – Hannah Montana: The Movie; Vanessa Hudgens – High School Musical 3: Senior Year
Best Villain	Best Comedic Performance
**Heath Ledger – The Dark Knight**; Derek Mears – Friday the 13th; Dwayne Johnson – Get Smart; Johnathon Schaech – Prom Night; Luke Goss – Hellboy II: The Golden Army	**Jim Carrey – Yes Man**; Amy Poehler – Baby Mama; Steve Carell – Get Smart; Anna Faris – The House Bunny; James Franco - Pineapple Express
Best Song from a Movie	Best Kiss
**Miley Cyrus — "The Climb" (from Hannah Montana: The Movie)**; A. R. Rahman — "Jai Ho" (from Slumdog Millionaire); Bruce Springsteen — "The Wrestler" (from The Wrestler); Paramore — "Decode" (from Twilight)	**Kristen Stewart and Robert Pattinson – Twilight**; Sean Penn and James Franco – Milk; James McAvoy and Angelina Jolie – Wanted; Dev Patel and Freida Pinto – Slumdog Millionaire; Vanessa Hudgens and Zac Efron – High School Musical 3: Senior Year; Paul Rudd and Thomas Lennon – I Love You, Man
Best Fight	Best WTF Moment
**Robert Pattinson vs. Cam Gigandet – Twilight**; Ron Perlman vs. Luke Goss – Hellboy II: The Golden Army; Anne Hathaway vs. Kate Hudson – Bride Wars; Christian Bale vs. Heath Ledger – The Dark Knight; Seth Rogen and James Franco vs. Danny McBride – Pineapple Express	**Peeing in the Sink – Amy Poehler (from Baby Mama)**; Curved Bullet Kill – Angelina Jolie (from Wanted); Jumping in the Poop Shed – Ayush Mahesh Khedekar (from Slumdog Millionaire); Tasting the Decapitated Head – Ben Stiller (from Tropic Thunder); Naked Break-Up – Jason Segel and Kristen Bell (from Forgetting Sarah Marshall)

=== MTV Generation ===
- **Ben Stiller**

== Notable moments ==
- Brüno, a flamboyant gay character played by Sacha Baron Cohen, staged a stunt with Eminem in which he was "flying" overhead in the theatre toward the stage to present the award for Best Male Performance. Baron Cohen was dressed as an angel, and he was wearing only a jockstrap underneath his costume. In mid-flight, he was lowered upside-down from the rafters after an apparent problem with his wire harness. This caused him to land directly on top of Eminem in such a way that Baron Cohen's fully exposed buttocks area was positioned directly in Eminem's face. An apparently incensed Eminem angrily shouted "You serious?" and "Are you fuckin' serious?!" and then "Get this motherfucker off me!", demanding that his bodyguards and members of D12 remove Baron Cohen from atop him. After they aggressively shoved Baron Cohen away while he was still suspended in the air, Eminem and his entourage stormed out of the theater immediately. Baron Cohen then announced the winner of the Best Male Performance award (Zac Efron for High School Musical 3: Senior Year) while still hanging from harness wires above the audience. Eminem and Baron Cohen later claimed the event was staged and had been rehearsed extensively. Eminem claimed that after he "stormed" out of the theatre he went back to his hotel room and "laughed uncontrollably for about three hours". However, while the prank is widely accepted as being staged - at least on Baron Cohen's part - commentators have questioned as to how much (if at all) Eminem truly was in on the joke.
- Heath Ledger's performance as The Joker in The Dark Knight earned the actor a posthumous award for Best Villain.
- Kiefer Sutherland jokingly broke down in tears while presenting the MTV Generation Award to Ben Stiller.
- Taylor Swift, Aziz Ansari, and Justin Timberlake acted in the cold open skit with Samberg.

== Sneak Peeks ==
- Transformers: Revenge of the Fallen
- Harry Potter and the Half-Blood Prince
- The Twilight Saga: New Moon
