= Dan Mazer =

British screenwriter, producer and director

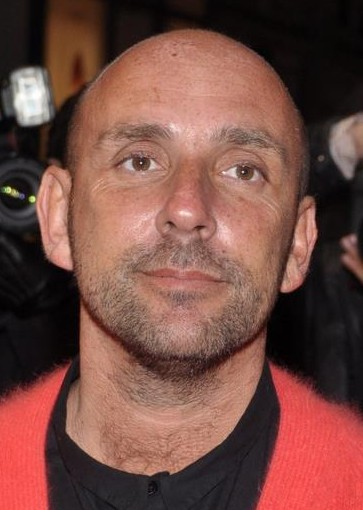
- Mazer in Paris at a premiere of I Give It a Year, April 2013.
- Born: 4 October 1971 (age 54); London, England
- Known for: Writing and production partner of Sacha Baron Cohen
- Spouse: Daisy Donovan (m. 2005)
- Children: Two

Daniel Gideon Mazer (born 4 October 1971) is a British comedy writer, director and producer. He is the long-time writing and production partner of comedian Sacha Baron Cohen, and worked with him on his characters Ali G, Borat, and Brüno. He also co-wrote and co-produced the films based on Baron Cohen's characters such as Ali G Indahouse, Borat, and Brüno.

== Early life ==
Mazer attended The Haberdashers' Aske's Boys' School, where he met Baron Cohen. He went on to study Law at Peterhouse, Cambridge University, and graduated in 1994. He was an active member of Cambridge Footlights while at university and was vice president from 1993 to 1994.

== Career ==
His early work includes production roles on The Word, The Big Breakfast and The 11 O'Clock Show.

In 2007 he was nominated for the Academy Award for Best Adapted Screenplay for co-writing the film Borat: Cultural Learnings of America for Make Benefit Glorious Nation of Kazakhstan. He shared his nomination with Sacha Baron Cohen, Ant Hines, Peter Baynham, and Todd Phillips. They ended up losing to The Departed.

In 2013 he made his feature film directing debut with the British comedy I Give It a Year. He followed it with the 2016 American comedy Dirty Grandpa.

In 2020 he co-wrote the script for Borat Subsequent Moviefilm, for which he was again nominated for the Academy Award for Best Adapted Screenplay and also won a Writers Guild Award.

== Personal life ==
Mazer is married to television personality Daisy Donovan, with whom he has two daughters.

== Filmography ==
Year	Title	Director	Writer	Producer
2002	Ali G Indahouse	No	Yes	Yes
2006	Borat	No	Yes	Executive
2009	Brüno	No	Yes	Yes
2012	The Dictator	No	No	Executive
2013	I Give It a Year	Yes	Yes	No
2016	Dirty Grandpa	Yes	No	No
2016	Bridget Jones's Baby	No	Yes	No
2016	Office Christmas Party	No	Yes	No
2020	Borat Subsequent Moviefilm	No	Yes	Executive
2021	The Exchange	Yes	No	No
2021	Home Sweet Home Alone	Yes	No	No
2025	Bridget Jones: Mad About the Boy	No	Yes	No
2026	The Sheep Detectives	No	Uncredited	No
2026	Ali G: Who Iz I?	No	Yes	No
TBA	Untitled Big Jim film	Yes	No	No

== See also ==
- List of Academy Award winners and nominees from Great Britain
