= Brüno Gehard =

- Sacha Baron Cohen character
- Sacha Baron Cohen as Brüno Gehard
- First appearance: "Law" (Da Ali G Show; 2003)
- Last appearance: Brüno (2009)
- Created by: Sacha Baron Cohen
- Portrayed by: Sacha Baron Cohen

In-universe information
- Alias: Straight Dave
- Gender: Male
- Occupation: Fashion reporter, fashion journalist
- Significant other: Lutz Schulze
- Children: OJ (adopted son)
- Nationality: Austrian

Brüno Gehard (/ˈɡeɪˌhɑːrd/ GAY-hard or /ɡəˈhɑːrd/ gə-HARD; German: [ˈbʁyːnoː ɡəˈhaʁt]) is a satirical fictional character portrayed by English comedian Sacha Baron Cohen. A flamboyantly gay fashion reporter from Austria, Brüno first appeared during short sketches on Paramount Comedy 1 in 1998, before reappearing on a 2003 episode of Da Ali G Show. Following the success of Ali G Indahouse and Borat, Universal Studios gained the rights to produce and release a 2009 feature film about the character, also called Brüno. The character has since been retired.

== Eminem incident ==
In May 2009, Brüno appeared at the MTV Movie Awards, dressed as an angel with wings strapped to his buttocks as he descended on wires from the ceiling. As part of a prank, after an alleged equipment malfunction, he was lowered onto rapper Eminem who was seated directly beneath him. Brüno landed in Eminem's lap in a 69-esque position, with his exposed buttocks in Eminem's face. Members of D12 helped to remove Brüno. Eminem and D12 then stormed out of the ceremony. Eminem appeared surprised and angry about the prank, but both he and Baron Cohen later claimed that the incident had been staged and rehearsed by the two. Eminem told reporters that he laughed uncontrollably for three hours in his hotel room afterward.

== Reaction ==
The 2009 feature film Brüno was well received by The Guardian, who described him as "howlingly funny, staggeringly rude, brutally incorrect and very often just brilliant".

=== LGBT response ===
Some LGBT groups have criticized the character as perpetuating LGBT stereotypes. "Sacha Baron Cohen's well-meaning attempt at satire is problematic in many places and outright offensive in others," Rashad Robinson, senior director of media programmes for the Gay and Lesbian Alliance Against Defamation (GLAAD) told The New York Times.

=== Ayman Abu Aita lawsuit ===
Baron Cohen appeared as Brüno on Late Show with David Letterman in July 2009, where he made reference to Ayman Abu Aita (whom Brüno interviewed in the film) as a terrorist. Abu Aita was identified in the film as a member of al-Aqsa Martyrs' Brigades, a Palestinian terrorist organization responsible for numerous suicide bombings. Abu Aita claimed that he was never a member of the group, though he had identified as such in a 2002 Boston Globe article. He had also served two years in an Israeli prison for his role in the Second Intifada. Abu Aita made plans to sue, saying that he was misled and that he did not sign release forms for the footage of him that appeared in the film. Baron Cohen increased his security detail after WorldNetDaily claimed to receive a statement from al-Aqsa Martyrs' Brigades threatening his life following the premiere of the film. In December 2009, Abu Aita sued Baron Cohen and Letterman at a federal court in Washington, D.C. In November 2010, the lawsuit was dismissed in D.C. so it could be refiled in the Supreme Court of New York, which also dismissed it in July 2012.
