= Brüno =

2009 mockumentary comedy film by Larry Charles

- Theatrical release poster
- Directed by: Larry Charles
- Screenplay by: Sacha Baron Cohen; Anthony Hines; Dan Mazer; Jeff Schaffer
- Story by: Sacha Baron Cohen; Peter Baynham; Anthony Hines; Dan Mazer
- Based on: Brüno Gehard by Sacha Baron Cohen
- Produced by: Sacha Baron Cohen; Jay Roach; Dan Mazer; Monica Levinson
- Starring: Sacha Baron Cohen; Gustaf Hammarsten
- Cinematography: Anthony Hardwick; Wolfgang Held
- Edited by: James Thomas; Scott M. Davids
- Music by: Erran Baron Cohen
- Production companies: Media Rights Capital; Four by Two Films; Everyman Pictures
- Distributed by: Universal Pictures
- Release dates: July 10, 2009 (United States and United Kingdom)
- Running time: 83 minutes
- Countries: United States; United Kingdom (Note: Bruno is a co-production of the United States and the United Kingdom, attributed to multiple sources:)
- Languages: English; German
- Budget: $42 million
- Box office: $139 million

Brüno is a 2009 mockumentary comedy film directed by Larry Charles and written by Sacha Baron Cohen, Anthony Hines, Dan Mazer, and Jeff Schaffer, the former three of whom co-wrote the story with Peter Baynham. Baron Cohen stars as the Austrian fashion journalist Brüno Gehard, who travels to Los Angeles in the hopes of launching a celebrity interview show, pushing the boundaries of decorum to its limit in the process. Gustaf Hammarsten also stars. It is the third film based on one of Baron Cohen's characters from Da Ali G Show (2000–04), following Ali G Indahouse (2002) and Borat! Cultural Learnings of America for Make Benefit Glorious Nation of Kazakhstan (2006).

Brüno was released on July 10, 2009, in the United States and United Kingdom by Universal Pictures. It received mixed reviews from critics and was a commercial success, grossing $139 million worldwide on a $42 million budget.

== Title ==
An alternative title for the film is Brüno: Delicious Journeys Through America for the Purpose of Making Heterosexual Males Visibly Uncomfortable in the Presence of a Gay Foreigner in a Mesh T-Shirt. It was initially a mock title proposed by Hollywood news and gossip blog Defamer and mistakenly reported as genuine by a number of sources of film information, including MovieTome, where it was still being used in the search results as late as 2011, The Irish Times, The Boston Globe, and the IMDb.

== Plot ==
Gay Austrian fashion reporter Brüno Gehard is fired from his own television show, Funkyzeit mit Brüno, after disrupting a Milan Fashion Week catwalk, and his lover Diesel leaves him for another man. Accompanied by his assistant's assistant, Lutz Schulz, he travels to the United States to become a famous Hollywood celebrity.

Brüno unsuccessfully attempts an acting career as an extra on Medium. He then interviews Paula Abdul, until he scares her off when he serves her sushi on the body of a totally naked Mexican man, even though she had no problem sitting on a fully clothed Mexican man beforehand. He then produces a celebrity interview pilot, showing him dancing erotically, criticizing Jamie Lynn Spears' fetus with reality TV star Brittny Gastineau, unsuccessfully attempting to interview actor Harrison Ford, (who angrily tells Brüno to “Fuck Off” while walking from a parallel-parked car into a building) and closing with a close-up of his penis being swung around by pelvic gyrations followed by the urethera closing and opening appearing to say Brüno. A focus group reviewing the pilot hated it. Brüno then attempts and fails to make a sex tape by seducing politician Ron Paul, claiming to have mistaken him for drag queen RuPaul. Paul angrily storms from the hotel room, muttering about Brüno's homosexuality, after Brüno had dropped his pants and danced around the room.

Brüno consults a spiritualist to contact the deceased Rob Pilatus of Milli Vanilli (a former lover) for advice, miming various sex acts on the "invisible" Pilatus. He consults charity consultants to select a world problem to maximize his fame, choosing the Israeli–Palestinian conflict. He flies to Jerusalem to interview former Mossad agent Yossi Alpher and Palestinian politician Ghassan Khatib and confuses hummus and Hamas. He sings his own song, "Dove of Peace", while cajoling the two to caress each other's hands. He also meets with Ayman Abu Aita, a Christian Palestinian aid worker misrepresented as a militant group leader of al-Aqsa Martyrs' Brigades in a Palestinian refugee camp in Lebanon, where he hopes to be kidnapped. (Note: The actual location, according to Abu Aita, was a private section of a popular restaurant at the Everest Hotel in the town of Beit Jala, in a section of the West Bank opposite Bethlehem under Israeli control. al-Aqsa Martyrs' Brigades is a coalition of Palestinian militias in the West Bank. Abu Aita claims to be a grocery store owner unaffiliated with al-Aqsa and pursued legal action against Baron Cohen.) Brüno insults him and he is ordered to leave.

Brüno interviews parents of child models, asking if their toddlers would undergo liposuction and perform dangerous stunts. On a talk show hosted by Richard Bey, he initially draws sympathy from the African American audience by describing his "difficulties" in raising a child as a single parent, but then disapproval when he reveals he's looking for "Mr. Right". Brüno shows off the baby he named O.J., whom he acquired in Africa by trading him for a U2 Product Red iPod. He shows photographs of the boy in dangerous and provocative situations, and the audience is appalled. Social services take O.J. from Brüno, driving him to depression. He goes to a diner to gorge on high-carb junk food. Lutz carries him back to a hotel room. After a night of sex, they awake to find themselves trapped in a bondage mechanism, unable to find the key. They call a hotel engineer for help and are asked to leave. After accosting a group of anti-gay protesters from the Westboro Baptist Church while still in bondage gear and boarding a bus, Brüno and Lutz remove their equipment in Huntsville, Alabama. After being arrested, Lutz says he loves Brüno, but Brüno does not reciprocate, stating he was influenced by "carb goggles". Lutz leaves Brüno.

After realizing the biggest names in Hollywood are heterosexual, Brüno consults two gay converters to help him become heterosexual. He attempts other "masculine" activities, such as learning karate, joining the National Guard, going hunting, and attending a swingers' party (during which he is whipped by a dominatrix).

Eight months later, Brüno, under the alias "Straight Dave", hosts a cage fight in Arkansas, "Straight Dave's Man Slammin' Maxout". Lutz appears at the event and insults Brüno, prompting them to fight in the cage. During the confrontation, they begin to kiss and strip in front of shocked spectators who throw objects into the cage. The moment gets international press, and the now-famous Brüno attempts to marry Lutz, getting O.J. back in exchange for a MacBook Pro. At Abbey Road Studios, Brüno records "Dove of Peace" alongside Bono, Elton John, Chris Martin, Snoop Dogg, Sting, and Slash.

== Cast ==
- Sacha Baron Cohen as Brüno Gehard
- Gustaf Hammarsten as Lutz "Garry" Schulz
- Clifford Bañagale as Diesel Ramirez
- Chibundu & Chigozie Orukwowu as O.J. Gehard
- Josh Meyers as Kookus Mansfield
- Gary Williams as the spiritualist
- Michelle McLaren as the dominatrix
- Vic Henley as the ring announcer

Cameos as themselves

- Paula Abdul
- Ayman Abu Aita
- Yossi Alpher
- Richard Bey
- Bono
- Harrison Ford
- Brittny Gastineau
- Elton John
- Ghassan Khatib
- Chris Martin
- Paul McCartney
- Ron Paul
- Miguel Sandoval
- Avraham Sela
- Slash
- Snoop Dogg
- Sting

== Production ==
Baron Cohen was cognizant of his increased fame following the success of Borat, which led him to retire the character for a number of years, and realized it would be much harder to conduct his interviews as Brüno without being recognized. As a solution, Baron Cohen wore a wig that made his forehead appear smaller (easily recognizable in the Borat character), which, to his amazement, succeeded in hiding his identity for most of his interviews. Nevertheless, the flimsy nature of the disguise made Baron Cohen fear he would be recognized to the point that he chose to live in his trailer for almost the entire six-month shoot.

During Baron Cohen's Middle East interview of Alpher and Khatib, he repeatedly conflated Hamas and hummus and feigned belief that the conflict was between Jews and Hindus. The two interviewees (who had received a fee to appear on camera), convinced by the elaborate production, were confused by the questions but generally went along, even when Baron Cohen asked them to hold hands.

On June 6, 2008, a riot ensued during a stunt orchestrated by Baron Cohen and the film's producers, who staged a "Blue Collar Brawlin'" in Fort Smith, Arkansas. Patrons were lured to an event billed as cage fighting, held at a convention center, by print and Craigslist advertisements that promoted "hot girls", $1 beer, and $5 admission. Approximately 1,500 people attended the event and were greeted by signs informing them they were being filmed. No mobile phones, video, or cameras were allowed inside. The acts taking place became homosexual in nature, with Brüno inviting a man up to fight him, who turned out to be Lutz. Celine Dion's "My Heart Will Go On" started to play as both men began kissing and stripping. The audience reacted violently, throwing chairs and beer at the performers. The performers were Brüno (Baron Cohen) under the ironic gimmick, "Straight Dave", and Gustaf Hammarsten portraying his opponent, Lutz.

In July 2008, Tyler, Texas television station KETK-TV was approached by a "documentary filmmaker" who was allowed to bring a crew to interview a few staff members, including news director Neal Barton and sports director Danny Elzner. They signed releases and expected to be talking about small-town news in the United States. Instead, the interviews conducted by the flamboyant Brüno character drifted towards the topic of homosexuality.

In September 2008, video and photographs were released showing Baron Cohen (as Brüno) storming the catwalk with objects on his velcro outfit during an Ágatha Ruiz de la Prada fashion show in Milan (at which Paul McCartney also was present). Baron Cohen managed to walk down the runway for a few moments before the lights were dimmed and security guards escorted him away. This occurred after Baron Cohen and his crew were allegedly stopped by security while attempting to enter backstage at two other shows during Milan's fashion week.

On November 2, 2008, Baron Cohen, dressed as Brüno, and his film crew were spotted at a Los Angeles rally that was in support of California's Proposition 8.

On November 7, 2008, while appearing as an extra in a scene for the NBC TV series Medium, Baron Cohen interrupted a scene in character and was removed from the set. Production on the episode was temporarily shut down, though actor Miguel Sandoval, who was told that a cousin of NBC executive Ben Silverman would appear as an extra in the jury, has stated that he recognized Baron Cohen and played along, commenting, "It's one thing for Borat to go into an antique store in Georgia or Alabama. For Brüno to go on a TV show, he's among insiders. Most people knew who he was."

The production team also deceived presidential candidate Ron Paul into being interviewed by Brüno, posing as an Austrian television reporter seeking to question the congressman about economic issues. As soon as Brüno drops his trousers, the congressman storms out of the room. A spokeswoman for Paul commented on the incident. She said Baron Cohen's people were very deceptive in their tactics. At the time, he thought they were "legitimate", but later confessed to some concern. "I'm familiar with his work, so you can imagine how I feel about it," he said. Jesse Benton, senior vice-president of Ron Paul's Campaign for Liberty organization and former campaign spokesman for Paul, said Paul was not familiar with Baron Cohen's programme, Da Ali G Show. "If it's not on hard-core financial news, he doesn't follow it," Benton said. But, he added, "It sounds like it's going to be pretty funny."

The scene filmed during a taping of The Richard Bey Show, however, was staged, and Bey was in on the joke, as his daytime show went off the air in 1996. The audience, however, was not made aware of the true nature of the production. Paula Abdul was similarly unaware when, during her interview scene in the film, she sat atop a Mexican landscaper and was presented with food adorned upon a man lying down on a cart wearing nothing but a "sock" over his penis. Abdul told a radio interviewer that she was "scarred" by the incident.

Sacha Baron Cohen was assaulted while filming for the character of Brüno. During a segment filmed in Israel, Baron Cohen went to the Western Wall dressed in character—wearing leather boots, pink hotpants, and a leather vest. He reported that a group of Yeshiva students, along with a rabbi, began attacking him after the rabbi spat on him and insulted him. The assault was severe enough that Baron Cohen broke character to reveal his identity to stop the violence, and he suffered blackened eyes, requiring a two-week break in filming to recover.

== Release ==
Universal Pictures won the film's rights in 2006 after an intense bidding war, they paid $42.5 million for the domestic and some foreign distribution rights to the film, Sony Pictures Releasing International released the film in Latin America and some countries in Europe, Mandate International was the film's sale agent for other markets with the film sold to independent distributors, Nordisk Film distributed the film in Scandinavia, Ascot Elite Entertainment Group distributed the film in Switzerland and Medusa Film distributed the film in Italy.

Brüno had its premiere at the Grauman's Chinese Theatre on June 25, 2009. The premiere coincided with the death of pop singer Michael Jackson; his star on the Hollywood Walk of Fame was covered by the red carpet, resulting in fans of the singer visiting the star of radio host Michael Jackson instead. The film received an early release in Australia, Switzerland, Belgium, the Netherlands, New Zealand, and Iceland on July 8 and in Germany, Greece, Ireland, Serbia, Slovenia, Israel, and Bosnia and Herzegovina on July 9, 2009. It was released on July 10, 2009, in the United States.

=== Promotion ===
In a staged publicity stunt at the 2009 MTV Movie Awards, Baron Cohen appeared as Brüno to present the award for Best Male Performer. Dressed as a winged angel wearing a jockstrap and white go-go boots, he was suspended on wires and flew over the audience towards the stage, but fell and landed on rapper Eminem, with his head in Eminem's lap and his buttocks in front of Eminem's face. Eminem shouted, "Are you fucking serious?" and, "Get this motherfucker off me!" Eminem and his entourage then walked out of the show and did not return. It was later revealed that Eminem and Baron Cohen had staged the incident, rehearsing it beforehand to make sure it went off without a hitch, leaving Eminem laughing to himself in his hotel room about how the crowd was easily fooled.

=== Michael Jackson scene ===
Following the death of Michael Jackson on June 25, 2009, a scene from Brüno was hastily removed from the American theatrical version of the film before its Hollywood premiere later that evening. The scene involved Brüno tricking La Toya Jackson into an interview in which he asked her to take a seat on hunched over Mexican workers substituting for chairs and invited her to eat sushi from the torso of an overweight and hairy naked man. In a ploy to get Michael's phone number, Brüno asked La Toya to let him look at her mobile phone, which she did.

The latter part of this scene was later confirmed to be removed from the film permanently (about the phone number, but "the Mexicans as furniture scene" was included until the food is served on a naked man, at a SVT Swedish television broadcast of the film, February 2014), but is included in the DVD and Blu-ray release's special features.

=== Home media ===
The film was released on DVD and Blu-ray on November 17, 2009. Special features include deleted, alternative, and extended scenes and an audio commentary by Baron Cohen and Larry Charles.

== Reception and legacy ==
=== Box office ===
Brüno opened with $30,619,130, ranking number one in its first weekend. At the end of its run on August 20, it had grossed $60,054,530 in the United States and Canada and $78,751,301 overseas for a worldwide total of $138,805,831. For its opening weekend, it narrowly beat Ice Age: Dawn of the Dinosaurs (in its second week of release) for the highest gross, in the lowest attended second-weekend-in-July in 18 years.

=== Critical response ===
On Rotten Tomatoes the film has an approval rating of 68% based on 227 reviews, and an average rating of 6.6/10. The website's critical consensus reads: "Crude and offensive, but with ample cultural insights and gut-busting laughs, Bruno is another outlandish and entertaining mockumentary from Sacha Baron Cohen." Metacritic gives Brüno an average score of 54 out of 100 based on 34 critics, indicating "mixed or average" reviews. Audiences surveyed by CinemaScore gave the film a grade "C" on a scale of A+ to F.

Nick Curtis of the Evening Standard wrote that Brüno is "funnier, more offensive, and more outrageous than Borat". The Telegraph gave the film four stars out of four, saying "impossible not to laugh and also praising Brüno's controversial style of comedy." The BBC also gave the film a positive review, saying "Brüno pushes the boundaries further than Borat ever did." However, they also said that "It's not going to be everyone's cup of tea" due to the offensive nature of the film. Roger Ebert awarded the film three and a half out of four stars, and said "Here is a film that is 82 minutes long and doesn't contain 30 boring seconds", although he noted that the film's R rating was "very, very hard".

Andy Lowe from Total Film gave it a lower review, giving it three stars out of five and calling it "as phony and frustrating as it is funny... The clothes may be new and more fabulous, but the emperor seriously needs to go shopping." Others felt it was not as good, feeling it would insult and offend the gay community: A. O. Scott of The New York Times wrote that the film shows "that lampooning homophobia has become an acceptable, almost unavoidable form of homophobic humor," and called the film "a lazy piece of work that panders more than it provokes." At the Movies critic Ben Mankiewicz criticized the film for being too demeaning and playing on homosexual stereotypes. He later named Brüno the worst film at the halfway point of 2009.

=== Motion Picture Association of America ===
On October 11, 2010, it was revealed that the Motion Picture Association of America's Classification and Rating Administration would specifically note in the future which films contained "male nudity". A spokesman said this was in direct response to parental concerns about the content of Brüno.

=== Reception in Austria ===
While Borat was criticised in Kazakhstan, Austrians were generally positive about Brüno. Others regarded the humour as "pretty average" and "inoffensive to Austria". Within the Austrian press, reactions were generally mild and positive, although the film was also labelled "repetitive". Christian Fuchs, from the Austrian radio station FM4, wrote that "hidden beneath the hard-as-nails satirist Cohen, lies a humanist who enlightens." However, the film also met some opposition in Austria, due to its portrayal of homosexuality, and basing the portrayal of Austria on motifs such as Josef Fritzl and Adolf Hitler, even going as far as calling Mel Gibson "der Führer" as he pointed at the actor/director's photo in the film.

=== Ban in Ukraine ===
In Ukraine, the film was scheduled to premiere on July 23, but on July 14, the Minister of Culture and Tourism of Ukraine decided to ban the distribution and demonstration of the film in the country. The reason for the prohibition was that nine out of fourteen members of a commission of experts said the film contained "obscene language, homosexual scenes, and other scenes of offensive nature never shown in Ukraine." The "Vinnytsia Human Rights Group" immediately expressed its anger with the ban. Journalist Yevhen Minko accused the Ministry of moral censorship that missed the point of the film. An unofficial premiere of the film in Kyiv on July 22, 2009, was disrupted by a smoke bomb.

=== Lawsuit and death threats ===
On December 2, 2009, it was reported that Ayman Abu Aita, who stated he was falsely portrayed as a terrorist affiliated with the al-Aqsa Martyrs' Brigades in the film, was filing a lawsuit of $110 million in libel damages for defamation. Abu Aita states that he was never a member of al-Aqsa and was tricked into appearing in the film. In an interview with Time, he said, "It is true that I was jailed in 2003...I was active in resisting the occupation, in non-violent ways."

Baron Cohen claims he set up a meeting with Abu Aita in the West Bank with the help of a CIA agent. According to the lawsuit, the interview with Abu Aita took place at a hotel chosen by Baron Cohen and located in a part of the West Bank that was under Israeli military control. The filing of the lawsuit was confirmed at a press conference on December 2, 2009. Included in the lawsuit are David Letterman, NBC Universal, CBS, Worldwide Pants, Gannett Company, and Larry Charles. In November 2010, the lawsuit was dismissed in Washington D.C. Court so as to be refiled in the Supreme Court of New York. In July 2012, the lawsuit was reported to have been settled under undisclosed terms.

Baron Cohen said he had to increase his security detail following death threats from the al-Aqsa Martyrs' Brigades after the release of the film. The group was angered by the interview with Abu Aita in which he was linked with the group, an armed wing of the Fatah movement. al-Aqsa Martyrs' Brigades said that Abu Aita was not a member and that they "reserve the right to respond in the way we find suitable against this man (Baron Cohen)" and that they feel the segment was "a dirty use of our brother Ayman".
