= Da Ali G Show =

British satirical sketch comedy television series

- Also known as: Ali G in da USAiii (series 2); Ali G: Rezurection (FXX broadcasts); Da Ali G Show Remixed (Stan streaming)
- Genre: Satire
- Created by: Sacha Baron Cohen
- Starring: Sacha Baron Cohen
- Country of origin: United Kingdom
- No. of series: 3
- No. of episodes: 18 (list of episodes)

Production
- Running time: 30 minutes
- Production company: Talkback

Original release
- Network: Channel 4
- Release: 30 March – 5 May 2000
- Network: HBO
- Release: 21 February 2003 – 22 August 2004

Related
- The 11 O'Clock Show

Da Ali G Show is a British satirical sketch comedy television series created by and starring British comedian and actor Sacha Baron Cohen. In the series, Baron Cohen plays three unorthodox journalists: faux-streetwise poseur Ali G, Kazakh reporter Borat Sagdiyev, and gay Austrian fashion enthusiast Brüno Gehard. These characters conduct real interviews with unsuspecting people, many of whom are celebrities, high-ranking government officials, and other well-known figures, during which they are asked absurd and ridiculous questions.

The first (2000) series originally aired on Channel 4 in the UK, and the second and third (2003–2004) series on HBO in the United States. The second series was known as Ali G in da USAiii in the UK, Australia and New Zealand. In 2005, HBO stated they had no plans to make an additional series of the show.

Baron Cohen has gone on to make five films featuring each of his three characters from the show: Ali G Indahouse (2002), Borat: Cultural Learnings of America for Make Benefit Glorious Nation of Kazakhstan (2006), Brüno (2009), Borat Subsequent Moviefilm: Delivery of Prodigious Bribe to American Regime for Make Benefit Once Glorious Nation of Kazakhstan (2020) and Ali G: Who Iz I? (2026).

In 2014, FXX reaired the show (including episodes unaired in the United States) under the branding Ali G: Rezurection.

== Characters ==
=== Ali G ===
Ali G (Alistair Leslie Graham) is the main character of Da Ali G Show. He is the self-proclaimed "voice of da yoof" and the leader of the "West Staines Massiv". His mannerisms are a mix of stereotypical and often exaggerated British African-Caribbean and hip hop cultures, with some American urban influences thrown in. He interviews unsuspecting guests; in the American version of the show, he tells them he is a British talk show host and wants to discuss the media and politics. He often asks a question, and upon receiving an answer, instantly creates a story of an event relevant to the topic, employing his neighbours and fellow "gangsters" such as Ricky C, Dangerous Dave (who refuses to speak because he is terribly embarrassed about his voice) and Rainbow Jeremy (also known as Jezzy), his partner, whom he refers as "me Julie" (Jamaican slang for girlfriend) or a family member such as his grandmother or his Uncle Jamal (who is apparently secretly gay). The character was later the basis of the film Ali G Indahouse.

=== Borat Sagdiyev ===
Borat Sagdiyev is another character featured frequently on the show, introduced as someone Ali G came across on obscure satellite TV "whilst waiting for the 10-minute free preview on the Fantasy Channel". He comes from a fictionalized version of Kazakhstan, and travels around the United Kingdom and United States interviewing people and engaging in their activities. Though well-intentioned, Borat often makes his guests feel uncomfortable by introducing them to "Kazakh" customs, or by making misogynistic, antisemitic, or other politically incorrect comments based on his unfamiliar culture. The culture he presents is entirely fictional, however. For example, a real-world Roma ("Gypsy") village in Romania stood in for Borat's "typical Kazakh village", while the character of Borat dislikes Gypsies and claims to have once been a "Gypsy catcher". Similarly, the foreign language Baron Cohen speaks in this role is Hebrew, but interviewees and the average audience member are led to believe the antisemitic Borat is speaking in Kazakh. Borat makes references to his favourite sport called "shurik", a "Kazakh" custom where dogs are shot and killed in a field. He also makes references to his dead wife, his brother Bilo, and his desire to have "sexy time" with many of his interviewees. There are two films based on the character, Borat: Cultural Learnings of America for Make Benefit Glorious Nation of Kazakhstan, released in 2006; and the sequel Borat Subsequent Moviefilm: Delivery of Prodigious Bribe to American Regime for Make Benefit Once Glorious Nation of Kazakhstan, released in 2020.

=== Brüno ===
Brüno Gehard is a gay Austrian fashion reporter and is the third character of Da Ali G Show. He claims to be the voice of "Austrian gay television". He often makes others uncomfortable by flaunting his flagrant homosexuality. In one episode, Brüno performs cheers with exaggerated, limp-wristed, stereotypically gay mannerisms, along with University of Alabama cheerleaders, provoking the ire of some Crimson Tide fans during the 2002 Alabama–Mississippi State football game. He nevertheless convinces the students to say that they are gay, in Polish.

Brüno also interviews fashion aficionados and 'party people' and exposes their extreme views of how unfashionable people should be treated and aims to show the superficiality, hypocrisy and inconsistency of the fashion world. For example, he gets them to say that they think fashion has saved more lives than doctors, that people who have bad fashion should be sent to concentration camps, that Osama bin Laden is cool, and that if house music were around in the 1930s, it would have prevented World War II. Universal Pictures released a film about the character, Brüno, in 2009.

== Episodes ==
Series	Episodes	Originally released		
Series	Episodes	First released	Last released	Network
1	6	30 March 2000	5 May 2000	Channel 4
2	6	21 February 2003	28 March 2003	HBO
3	6	18 July 2004	22 August 2004	HBO

== Controversy ==
Baron Cohen's methods often caused considerable controversy. Some guests became upset upon learning they had been tricked, and various comments made on the show outraged viewers.

In one episode, Borat went to a bar in Tucson, Arizona, where he sang an antisemitic song called "In My Country There Is Problem" with lyrics including, "Throw the Jew down the well/So my country can be free/You must grab him by his horns/Then we have a big party." Many patrons of the bar were shown responding gleefully and singing along, though a later investigation by The Jewish Daily Forward found that many or all of the audience members were aware that the song was a joke and that Borat was a comedian in disguise. A Jewish audience member shown laughing in the HBO clip said, "You could tell right away it was a wig he was wearing, and a fake mustache. I would say 99% of the people in here saw that, too." The Anti-Defamation League complained about this segment, to which HBO spokesman Quentin Schaffer replied, "Through his alter egos, [Cohen] delivers an obvious satire that exposes people's ignorance and prejudice in much the way All in the Family did years ago." Baron Cohen, who is also Jewish, said in an interview that the show's Borat segments are a "dramatic demonstration of how racism feeds on dumb conformity as much as rabid bigotry" rather than a display of racism by Baron Cohen himself.

One upset interviewee was James Broadwater, a Republican candidate for Congress. He was interviewed by Borat, who told him that the interview would be played in Kazakhstan and other foreign countries to teach others about the American political system. Borat's questioning led Broadwater to state that Jews would go to Hell if they did not convert to Christianity. This comment upset some Jewish communities and prompted Broadwater to post a letter on his website denouncing Da Ali G Show, demanding the Federal Communications Commission (FCC) exert greater control over the "liberal, anti-God media", and saying, "I have had a logo on my website which says, 'I am a proud friend of Israel.'"

== Ali G: Rezurection ==
On 1 November 2013, FXX announced a deal to re-broadcast the show (including episodes unaired in America) under the branding Ali G: Rezurection, which started on 26 February 2014. The show featured new, original introductions starring Sacha Baron Cohen as Ali G. The show streamed under the name Da Ali G Show Remixed on Australian streaming service Stan.

== Opening sequence ==
The show's opening sequence, conceived and directed by Garth Jennings, has become well-known. It shows a naked Ali G standing under a spotlight in a black room, with each piece of his clothing flying in one by one (complete with action-packed sound effects) until he is fully dressed.

The intro has been parodied on The Simpsons and in the 2005 BBC mini-series Casanova starring David Tennant.
