= Ali G Indahouse =

2002 comedy film directed by Mark Mylod

- Cinema release poster
- Directed by: Mark Mylod
- Written by: Sacha Baron Cohen; Dan Mazer
- Produced by: Tim Bevan; Eric Fellner; Dan Mazer
- Starring: Sacha Baron Cohen; Michael Gambon; Charles Dance; Kellie Bright; Martin Freeman; Rhona Mitra; Barbara New; Stefan Kalipha
- Cinematography: Ashley Rowe
- Edited by: Paul Knight
- Music by: Adam F
- Production companies: Working Title Films; Talkback Productions
- Distributed by: Universal Pictures
- Release date: 22 March 2002 (United Kingdom)
- Running time: 88 minutes
- Country: United Kingdom
- Language: English
- Budget: £5 million
- Box office: £17.2 million

Ali G Indahouse is a 2002 British comedy film co-written by and starring Sacha Baron Cohen as Ali G, the character he originally played on the Channel 4 comedy series The 11 O'Clock Show and Da Ali G Show. Directed by Mark Mylod, it is the first of five films based on Baron Cohen's characters from Da Ali G Show, followed by Borat (2006), Brüno (2009), Borat Subsequent Moviefilm (2020), and Ali G: Who Iz I? (2026). It is the only one of these films to consist solely of a fictional narrative with no mockumentary element.

== Plot ==
Ali G leads Da West Staines Massiv, a fictional gang of wannabe gangsters from Staines, whose chief rivals are Da East Staines Massiv. When they learn that their beloved hangout, the John Nike Leisure Centre, where Ali also runs an after-school club, is to be demolished by the local council, they organise a protest. After Ali goes on hunger strike and is spotted chained to railings by Deputy Prime Minister David Carlton, he becomes embroiled in political corruption as Carlton seeks to use him to undermine the Prime Minister's reputation.

Ali is selected as a candidate to become the next MP for Staines but alienates most voters with his behaviour. During a debate, he attempts to discredit his opponent by claiming that he "sucked off a horse". Unbeknownst to Ali, the allegation is true, and the candidate withdraws, leaving Ali to win the election.

Despite his inexperience, Ali's unconventional ideas prove surprisingly effective. While visiting a customs checkpoint in Dover to compile a report, he invites members of the West Staines Massiv to pose as experts and consume confiscated drugs and pornography in the evidence room. His subsequent policies, including making education more relatable and encouraging the immigration of attractive women, increase his popularity. He achieves the Prime Minister's objectives, boosting the government's poll lead by 22 percentage points. In return, the Prime Minister promises to save the John Nike Leisure Centre.

Ali accompanies the Prime Minister to a United Nations peace conference intended to prevent war between Chad and Burkina Faso. With the United States and Russia supporting opposing sides and threatening nuclear attacks, Ali sneaks into the catering area and spikes everyone's tea with cannabis obtained during his customs visit. The drug brings the Chadian and Burkinabè leaders together, turning them into allies and lovers. The Prime Minister credits Ali with saving the world, but his secretary, Kate Hedges, discovers what Ali has done and sends the empty cannabis bag to the press, forcing Ali to leave Parliament.

Before the leisure centre can be saved, a video emerges showing Ali having sex with his girlfriend in the Prime Minister's bedroom at Chequers. As Ali is wearing the Prime Minister's clothes, the media mistake the footage for the Prime Minister's sex tape with a prostitute, forcing him to resign. Carlton becomes acting Prime Minister and orders the leisure centre's destruction. He reveals that he has bought all available property in Staines, knowing the town will be demolished to make way for a new terminal at Heathrow Airport, making him wealthy.

The West Staines Massiv races to recover the master copy of the tape that proves the former Prime Minister's innocence. Ali negotiates a truce with gangs across Staines to secure their help in breaking into the vaults where the tape is held. They retrieve it and restore the original Prime Minister to office. Staines is saved from destruction, with the Prime Minister announcing that Slough will be demolished instead. The film ends with Ali serving as British ambassador to Jamaica, where Carlton is forced to dance for his amusement.

== Cast ==
- Sacha Baron Cohen as Ali G/Borat Sagdiyev
- Michael Gambon as the Prime Minister
- Charles Dance as Deputy Prime Minister David Carlton
- Kellie Bright as “Me Julie”
- Martin Freeman as Richard “Ricky C” Cunningham
- Rhona Mitra as Kate Hedges
- Barbara New as Ali's Nan
- Ray Panthaki as Hassan B
- Emilio Rivera as Rico
- Paul Clayton as Alan Swan Lake
- Olegar Fedoro as Russian Minister
- Tony Way as Dave
- Eileen Essell as Mrs. Hugh
- Daniella Lavender as Maid
- Capri Ashby as Nurse Nina
- John Scott Martin as Mr. Johnson
- Graham McTavish as Customs Officer
- Naomi Campbell as herself
- Nabil Elouahabi as Jezzy F
- Bruce Jamieson as Journalist
- Anna Keaveney as Secretary
- Rudolph Walker as President Mwepu
- Stefan Kalipha as Iranian Delegate

== Production ==
=== Writing and concept ===
Co-writer and producer Dan Mazer said that he and Sacha Baron Cohen looked primarily to American comedy films rather than earlier British television spin-offs when developing the film. Mazer cited the American comedies they had grown up watching as a creative model and said that the filmmakers edited the film aggressively, removing scenes that did not contain a joke.

Mazer described Ali G as a character fascinated by the glamour and attitudes of American popular culture, particularly those presented through films and music television. He said that the comedy arose from the disparity between Ali's imagined identity and the reality of his suburban life in Staines.

=== Filming ===
The opening "gangland" dream sequence was filmed in Los Angeles, with all other scenes filmed in Manchester, London, and Staines. Filming also took place at Manchester Town Hall between 31 May and 2 June 2001 and at Mentmore Towers, Mentmore in Buckinghamshire. When Ali references the Berkshire Massiv of Englefield Green in the film, this is actually in Surrey; the John Nike Leisure Centre is a real facility called Willesden Sports Centre, which was subsequently knocked down with a new leisure centre built in its place.

=== Soundtrack ===
On 18 March 2002, a soundtrack album for the film was released. Featuring music used in the film, it also featured linking material by Ali G as if the album were a pirate radio broadcast on Ali's "Drive By FM". It was an enhanced CD, featuring the music video for "Me Julie".

== Release and reception ==
The film premiered in the United Kingdom on 22 March 2002, and was released in various other countries throughout the rest of 2002 and midway through 2003. It was given a limited theatrical release in the United States; the film was released on a few screens in Austin, Texas On September 5, 2003, but Universal had not reported the US box office result.

The film was released via DVD in the UK on 11 November 2002, and in the US and Canada on 2 November 2004. The DVD version has been modified from the original UK cinema version. In the original cut, the film opens with Ali appearing over the BBFC Certificate and changes the categorisation from 15 to 18. He goes on to warn about the dangers of having sex in the back row of the cinema (coming into contact with other people's semen on the seats) and to suggest that the audience's enjoyment will be enhanced by smoking cannabis. This 30-second introduction is missing from all international cinema releases and all current home video releases.

=== Commercial performance ===
Ali G Indahouse opened at number one at the United Kingdom box office, grossing approximately £3.2 million during its opening weekend. It ultimately grossed approximately £10.3 million in the United Kingdom and Ireland, a result that Screen Daily later described as strong for a release of the period. The film grossed £17.2 million worldwide against a £5 million budget.

=== Critical response ===
Ali G Indahouse received mixed reviews. The review aggregator website Rotten Tomatoes reported that 59% of critics have given the film a positive review based on 17 reviews, with an average rating of 5.16/10. On Metacritic, the film has a weighted average score of 46 out of 100 based on 9 critic reviews, indicating "mixed or average reviews". Writing for The Hollywood Reporter, Mark Adams called the film "intermittently hilarious as it attacks pretty much every taboo around". Peter Bradshaw of The Guardian gave the film three stars, describing it as energetic and densely packed with jokes, while acknowledging that much of its humour was deliberately crude and juvenile. Philip French of The Observer was considerably more negative, describing the film as a weak feature-length extension of a character whose central joke he believed had already worn thin.

=== Cultural Impact ===
The film and the wider Ali G character became strongly associated with Staines. In 2012, the town was officially renamed Staines-upon-Thames as part of an effort to strengthen its riverside identity. The association with Ali G was cited as one factor in discussions surrounding the change, although councillor Colin Davis, who promoted the renaming, stated that the town's image concerns predated the character.

== Sequel ==
In early July 2026, it was reported that a new Ali G movie had been filmed by Baron Cohen in secret. However, no official confirmation or details were released. Later that month, it was revealed that the sequel had been titled Ali G: Who Iz I?, with Amazon MGM Studios scheduling it for a theatrical release on 23 October 2026.
