= Borat (soundtrack) =

Stereophonic Musical Listenings That Have Been Origin in Moving Film "Borat: Cultural Learnings of America for Make Benefit Glorious Nation of Kazakhstan"

Soundtrack album to Borat by various artists
- Released: October 24, 2006 (iTunes); October 31, 2006 (U.S.)
- Genres: Traditional; folk; Romani
- Labels: Kuzçek Records (fictional); Downtown Records; Atlantic Records
- Producers: Monica Levinson (exec.); Richard Henderson (exec.); Josh Deutsch (exec.)

Sacha Baron Cohen film soundtracks chronology
Ali G Indahouse Da Soundtrack (2002)	Stereophonic Musical Listenings That Have Been Origin in Moving Film "Borat: Cultural Learnings of America for Make Benefit Glorious Nation of Kazakhstan" (2006)	Music from the Motion Picture The Dictator (2012)

Singles from Stereophonic Musical Listenings That Have Been Origin in Moving Film "Borat: Cultural Learnings of America for Make Benefit Glorious Nation of Kazakhstan"
- 1. "In My Country There Is Problem" Released: 2004 (Da Ali G Show), 2006 (album)

Professional ratings
Review scores
Source	Rating
AllMusic	3.5/5 stars
Robert Christgau	(3-star Honorable Mention)

Stereophonic Musical Listenings That Have Been Origin in Moving Film "Borat: Cultural Learnings of America for Make Benefit Glorious Nation of Kazakhstan" is the soundtrack to the 2006 mockumentary film Borat, released by the (heretofore nonexistent) "Kuzçek Records" in association with Downtown and Atlantic Records. The soundtrack was released digitally through the iTunes Store on October 24, 2006, and in stores and through other online music stores on Tuesday, October 31, 2006.

== Overview ==
The folk music included in the soundtrack has no connection to the authentic music of Kazakhstan. The album features songs mainly by Romani artists and includes music by Erran Baron Cohen, founding member of ZOHAR Sound System and brother of Borat star Sacha Baron Cohen, as well as songs sung by Sacha Baron Cohen himself in character as Borat.

In 2006, Macedonian Romani singer Esma Redžepova, along with Naat Veliov of Kočani Orkestar, planned to file a lawsuit against the producers of the movie. She claimed that her song "Chaje Šukarije", which is featured in the film, had been used without authorization. She demanded an €800,000 ($1,000,000) compensation from the producers of the film, otherwise she claimed she would bring the case to court and demand a much higher amount. However, Redžepova ultimately received a €26,000 compensation, as her producers had authorized the song's use in the film without notifying her.

"O Kazakhstan" is the fictional national anthem of Kazakhstan used in the movie. It was composed by Erran Baron Cohen. The tune of the song is similar to that of a military march. The actual Kazakh anthem is "Menıñ Qazaqstanym", the tune of which is different from "O Kazakhstan".

== International usage ==
In 2012, the parody national anthem was mistakenly played at the medal ceremony of Mariya Dmitriyenko at the Emir of Kuwait International Shooting Grand Prix. The incident apparently resulted from the wrong song being downloaded from the Internet.

== Track listing ==
1. "Chaje Shukarije" (performed by Esma Redžepova) – 4:22
2. "Born to Be Wild" (performed by Fanfare Ciocărlia) – 3:05
3. Dialoguing Excerpt from Moviefilm 1 (Borat) – 0:29
4. "Siki, Siki Baba" (performed by Kočani Orkestar) – 4:11
5. "Gypsy's Kolo" (performed by Jony Iliev & Band) – 2:11
6. Dialoguing Excerpt from Moviefilm 2 (Borat) – 0:13
7. "Eu Vin Acasa Cu Drag" (performed by Ștefan de la Bărbulești – 3:34
  - better known as the opening theme to "Borat's Guide to America"
8. "In My Country There Is Problem (Throw the Jew Down the Well)" (performed by Sacha Baron Cohen & Anthony Hines) – 2:17
9. "Grooming Pubis" (performed by Erran Baron Cohen) – 0:42
10. "Magic Mamaliga" (performed by O.M.F.O.) – 2:09
11. Dialoguing Excerpt from Moviefilm 3 (Borat) – 0:15
12. "Money Boney" (performed by O.M.F.O.) – 2:31
13. "You Be My Wife" (performed by Sacha Baron Cohen & Belinda Bedeković) – 3:09
14. Ederlezi (Scena Đurđevdana Na Reci) (performed by Goran Bregović) – 4:56
15. Dialoguing Excerpt from Moviefilm 4 ("Have Truck Die") – 0:10
16. "Mahalageasca (Bucovina Dub)" (performed by Mahala Rai Banda vs. Shantel) – 4:18
17. Dialoguing Excerpt from Moviefilm 5 (Borat) – 0:12
18. "O Kazakhstan" (performed by Erran Baron Cohen) – 1:54

Enhanced CD content

1. "Cheese toast" (Deleted scene)
2. "Humor Coach" (Entire scene from film)
3. "O Kazakhstan" (sing along clip with lyrics)

=== Non-album tracks ===
The album does not contain all songs in the film. Some more popular standards are used, and are not licensed for soundtrack use.

- "Everybody's Talkin'" (Harry Nilsson) plays when Borat arrives in New York City
- "Take My Breath Away" (Berlin) is heard when Borat first sees Pamela Anderson on TV
- "Ridin' the Rodeo" by Vince Gill and Kostas Lazarides and sung by Vince Gill is heard before Borat sings the supposedly Kazakh anthem on a rodeo track.
- "Ederlezi" (performed by Goran Bregović) is heard during final seconds of Borat watching P. Anderson on TV
- "Born to Be Wild" (Steppenwolf) can be heard as Borat and Azamat travel with the bear
- "Lullaby" (Goran Bregović) is heard as Borat says goodbye to Luenell
- An excerpt of "U Can't Touch This" (MC Hammer) plays during Borat's ride in the RV with the frat guys

== Charts ==
Chart (2006)	Peak position
UK Compilation Albums (Official Charts)	98
UK Soundtrack Albums (Official Charts)	23
US Top Soundtracks (Billboard)	23
