= The Dictator (soundtrack) =

The Dictator: Music from the Motion Picture

Soundtrack album by various artists
- Released: May 8, 2012
- Length: 40:44
- Label: Aladeen Records (fictional)
- Producer: Erran Baron Cohen; Peter Amato; George Drakoulias; Robert Berry

Sacha Baron Cohen film soundtracks chronology
Stereophonic Musical Listenings That Have Been Origin in Moving Film "Borat: Cultural Learnings of America for Make Benefit Glorious Nation of Kazakhstan" (2006)	The Dictator: Music from the Motion Picture (2012)

Music from the Motion Picture The Dictator is the soundtrack to Larry Charles's 2012 film The Dictator. It was released on May 8, 2012 via (the fictional) Aladeen Records. The majority of the songs are sung in Wadiyan despite it being a fictional language; however, it is closely associated with the German, Hungarian, and Arabic languages.

Primarily produced by Erran Baron Cohen, Peter Amato, George Drakoulias and Robert Berry, the album features contributions from film star Admiral General Aladeen, along with Jalal el Hamdaoui, Ali Hassan Kuban, Khaled, Omar Fadel and Souad Massi among others.

== Track listing ==
No.	Title	Writer(s)	Producer(s)	Length
1.	"Aladeen Madafaka (The Next Episode)" (performed by Naufalle "Aiwa" Al Wahab, El Tayeb "Mr Tibbz" Ibrahim and Admiral General Aladeen)	David Axelrod; Brian Bailey; Melvin Bradford; Calvin Broadus; Andre Young	Peter Amato; George Drakoulias	2:43
2.	"Ila Nzour Nebra" (performed by Jalal Hamdaoui and Driver)	Jalal el Hamdaoui; Driver		3:22
3.	"Habibi" (performed by Ali Hassan Kuban)	Ali Hassan Kuban		4:21
4.	"Everybody Hurts" (performed by MC Rai)	William Berry; Peter Buck; Michael Stipe; Michael Mills	Robert Berry; Erran Baron Cohen	5:28
5.	"Wahrane Wahrane" (performed by Khaled)	Ahmed Wahdi; Khaled Hadj Brahim		4:43
6.	"9 to 5" (performed by Michelle J. Nasser)	Dolly Parton	Peter Amato; Erran Baron Cohen	2:41
7.	"Goulou L'Mama" (performed by Jalal Hamdaoui and Cheb Rayan)	Jalal el Hamdaoui		4:01
8.	"The Song of Admiral General Sargeant Aladeen" (performed by Erran Baron Cohen and Omar Fadel)	Erran Baron Cohen; Omar Fadel		2:56
9.	"Let's Get It On" (performed by Mohamed Amer)	Marvin Gaye; Edward Townsend	Peter Amato; Erran Baron Cohen	1:57
10.	"Raoui" (performed by Souad Massi)	Souad Bendjael		3:46
11.	"Money's on the Dresser" (performed by Erran Baron Cohen and Jules Brookes)	Sacha Baron Cohen; Erran Baron Cohen; Alec Berg; David Mandel; Jeff Schaffer		2:45
12.	"Our Beloved Leader" (performed by The Aladeenies)			2:01
Total length:				40:44

== Charts ==
Chart (2012)	Peak position
Belgian Albums (Ultratop Flanders)	190
US Top Comedy Albums (Billboard)	6
