= OMFO =

Ukrainian-Dutch electronic music project

- Also known as: Our Man from Odessa, O.M.F.O.
- Origin: Amsterdam, Netherlands
- Genres: Electronic music, world music, Balkan Beats, electro-folk
- Years active: Late 1990s–present
- Labels: Essay Recordings, Kidnap, Solaris, G-Stone Recordings
- Website: omfo.net (archived)

German Popov (born 1966, Odessa, Ukrainian SSR, USSR) is a Ukrainian-born, Amsterdam-based electronic musician and producer known as OMFO (an acronym for Our Man from Odessa, also spelled O.M.F.O.).

His work blends electronic music with folk traditions from the Balkans, the Caucasus, Central Asia, and the Black Sea region, incorporating traditional acoustic instruments alongside synthesizers and digital production. Popov's music has been described as "village disco" and "space folklore." Two of his tracks, "Money Boney" and "Magic Mamaliga," were featured on the soundtrack of the 2006 film Borat.

== Early life and emigration ==
German Popov was born in 1966 in the port city of Odesa, then part of the Ukrainian SSR. In 1989, during the Perestroika era, he emigrated to Amsterdam, Netherlands.

== Career ==
=== Early projects (late 1980s–1990s) ===
After arriving in Amsterdam, Popov began performing Russian gangster ballads and prison songs alongside fellow Odessan émigré Alec Kopyt in a duo called The Children of Lieutenant Schmidt, a name borrowed from Ilf and Petrov's satirical novel The Little Golden Calf. Kopyt later became a founding member of the Amsterdam Klezmer Band.

Popov subsequently formed the electronic group Sputnik with other Soviet expatriates, which released one album, The Favorite Songs of Soviet Cosmonauts. During this period he also recorded an album of Central Asian–influenced music under the name Isiric for the Dutch new age label Oreade Music.

In the late 1990s, Popov launched his solo project under the name Our Man from Odessa, releasing early works on the Dutch label Kidnap, which was run by members of the ex-Soviet diaspora in the Netherlands. He also collaborated and toured internationally with Tuvan vocalist Sainkho Namtchylak.

=== Solaris art lab and the OMFO name (early 2000s) ===
Around the turn of the millennium, Popov and collaborators established Solaris, which they described not as a record label but as an "art lab" inspired by Russian constructivism and utopian aesthetics. The project's releases included albums titled Aelita, Cheap Electric Paradise, and Omnipresence, which have become collector's items. During this period, the project name was shortened from Our Man from Odessa to the acronym OMFO. Through Solaris, Popov came into contact with electronic artists including Metamatics, Jimpster, and Felix Kubin.

=== Trans Balkan Express and Borat (2004–2006) ===
Through producer Vladimir Lomberg, Popov connected with the Berlin-based Essay Recordings, a label focused on Eastern European music. His debut on the label began with a remix of a track by Shantel, which was included on the Bucovina Club compilation. Essay then commissioned a full album, resulting in Trans Balkan Express (2004), which blended Balkan, Romanian, Ukrainian, Greek, and Romani folk melodies with electronic production, dub techniques, and analogue synthesizers.

The album gained widespread attention across Europe and led to tracks being licensed for various compilations. The track "Bagdub," omitted from the album due to its Arabic influence, was released separately on Richard Dorfmeister's G-Stone Recordings as part of the Dub Club compilation.

In 2006, two tracks from Trans Balkan Express — "Money Boney" and "Magic Mamaliga" — were selected by Sacha Baron Cohen for use in the film Borat: Cultural Learnings of America for Make Benefit Glorious Nation of Kazakhstan.

=== We Are the Shepherds and later work (2006–present) ===
For his second Essay Recordings album, We Are the Shepherds (2006), Popov collaborated with Chilean-German electronic musician Uwe Schmidt (known as Señor Coconut and Atom™). The album's ironic reference to Kraftwerk in its title (echoing Trans-Europe Express) was intended to emphasise the project's electronic concept.

For live performances, Popov assembled a five-piece ensemble featuring Vasile Nedea (cimbalom and accordion), Rassul Kazimov (tar and guitar), Bakhtiyar Eybaliyev (percussion and vocals), and Fay Lovsky (theremin and musical saw).

A third album, Omnipresence, followed in 2009.

Beyond his recorded output, Popov has composed the soundtrack for the first Central Asian pavilion at the Venice Biennale, produced jingles for Turkmen radio stations, and contributed tracks to the Russian film Manga directed by Pyotr Khazizov. He is also known as a field recordist, travelling to remote areas of Central Asia and the Caucasus to document traditional music.

== Musical style ==
OMFO's music has been characterised as a fusion of Eastern European and Central Asian folk traditions with electronic production techniques. His instrumentation combines traditional acoustic instruments — including the dombra, ney, cimbalom, tar, theremin, and musical saw — with analogue synthesizers, drum machines, and digital processing. Popov is also an accomplished throat singer.

Critics have compared his approach to that of Señor Coconut, noting a shared interest in reinterpreting regional folk music through an electronic lens.

== Discography ==
=== Studio albums ===
Year	Title	Label
2004	Trans Balkan Express	Essay Recordings
2006	We Are the Shepherds	Essay Recordings
2009	Omnipresence	Essay Recordings

=== Earlier releases (as other projects) ===
- The Favorite Songs of Soviet Cosmonauts (as Sputnik)
- Album under the name Isiric (Oreade Music)

=== Notable compilation appearances ===
- Bucovina Club (Shantel compilation, Essay Recordings) — remix contribution
- Dub Club (G-Stone Recordings) — "Bagdub"
- Borat: Cultural Learnings of America for Make Benefit Glorious Nation of Kazakhstan (2006 film soundtrack) — "Money Boney," "Magic Mamaliga"
