= Gypsy Beats and Balkan Bangers =

2006 compilation album

Gypsy Beats and Balkan Bangers and its follow up Gypsy Beats and Balkan Bangers Too are two compilations of Eastern European-inspired music tracks, compiled by DJs Russ Jones and Felix Buxton (of Basement Jaxx). The album was released on Basement Jaxx's record label Atlantic Jaxx in 2006 (volume one) and 2007 (volume two).

== Gypsy Beats and Balkan Bangers ==
Gypsy Beats and Balkan Bangers

Compilation album by Various artists
- Released: June 19, 2006
- Genre: Eastern European-inspired, house
- Length: 66:03
- Label: Atlantic Jaxx
- Compiler: DJ Russ Jones and Felix B

=== Critical reception ===
BBC Music said of the first volume: "Sometimes, the marching programmed beats can be a touch insistent, but the wild wedding band vitality always remains untamed." Allmusic, in their 3/5 star review, said: "Overall, there is plenty to spin and take in, and being marred by a couple of cuts near the end spoils nothing. Check it." Pitchfork Media also called the compilation "excellent".

=== Track listing ===
1. Bucovina - Shantel
2. Mahalageasca - Mahala Rai Banda
3. Bulgarian Chicks - Balkan Beat Box
4. Balkan Hot Step - N.O.H.A.
5. James Bond Theme - Fanfare Ciocărlia
6. Usti Usti Baba - Kocani Orkestar & Señor Coconut
7. Spoitoresa - Mahala Rai Banda
8. Hora Andalusia - Fanfare Ciocărlia
9. Start Wearing Purple - Gogol Bordello
10. Mi Bori Sa Korani - Kocani Orkestar
11. Dostlar Bizim Halaya - Buzuki Orhan Osman & King Naat Veliov/Original Kocani Orkestar
12. Bucovina - Shantel
13. Mahalageasca - Mahala Rai Banda
14. Epoitoresa - Mahala Rai Banda
15. Bucovina - Shantel

== Gypsy Beats and Balkan Bangers Too ==
Gypsy Beats and Balkan Bangers Too

Compilation album by Various Artists
- Released: 30 July 2007
- Genre: Eastern European-inspired, house
- Length: 47:29
- Label: Atlantic Jaxx
- Compiler: DJ Russ Jones and Felix B

=== Track listing ===
1. Sahib Balkan - Buscemi
2. La Revedere - Dunkelbunt & Amsterdam Klezmer Band
3. Super Good - Leningrad
4. Mozzarella - Kal
5. Goldregen - DelaDap
6. Romano Hip Hop - gipsy.cz
7. Sing Even If You Got No Bread - Haydamaky
8. Daddy - Binder & Krieglstein
9. Wedding Song - Boom Pam
10. Hava Nagila - Municipale Balcanica
11. Dobrij Aben - Russkaja
12. Dunkelbunt Dub - Dunkelbunt & Amsterdam Klezmer Band
13. Mozzarella - Kal
14. Hava Nagila - Municipale Balcanica
