= Glod =

Glod may refer to:

== People ==
- Glöð, a legendary queen recorded in Þorsteins saga Víkingssonar
- Glod, a nickname bestowed upon Glenn Beck by Stephen Colbert
- Glod Glodsson, a fictional character in Terry Pratchett's novel Soul Music
- Desiree Glod (born 1982), volleyball player
- Paul Glod (1919–2004), American football player and coach

== Places in Romania ==
- Glod, a village in Almașu Mare Commune, Alba County
- Glod, Dâmboviţa, a village in Moroeni Commune, Dâmboviţa County
- Glod, a village in Strâmtura Commune, Maramureș County
- Glod, a village in Lapoș Commune, Prahova County
- Glod, a village in Gâlgău Commune, Sălaj County
- Glod River, a tributary of the river Vulcana
- Glodu-Petcari, a village in Chiliile Commune, Buzău County

== See also ==
- Gold
