= Ialomicioara (left tributary) =

- Location within Romania

Location
- Country: Romania
- Counties: Dâmbovița County
- Villages: Glod, Pucheni

Physical characteristics
- Source: Bucegi Mountains
- Mouth: Ialomița
  - location: Pucheni
  - coordinates: 45.2259°N 25.4284°E
- Length: 14 km (8.7 mi)
- Basin size: 75 km^{2} (29 sq mi)

Basin features
- Progression: Ialomița→ Danube→ Black Sea
- Tributaries
  - left: Claia cu Brazi, Pietricica, Gâlma
  - right: Cărpiniș, Mușchiu, Glod
- River code: XI.1.4

The Ialomicioara is a left tributary of the river Ialomița in Romania. It discharges into the Ialomița in Pucheni. Its length is 14 km (8.7 mi) and its basin size is 75 km^{2} (29 sq mi).
