= Zohar (band) =

British musical band

- Genres: World fusion, Electronica, Dub, Hip-Hop, Dance
- Years active: 2001–present
- Labels: Ark 21
- Members: Erran Baron Cohen; Avivit Caspi; Johan YoYo Buys; Preston Heyman

Zohar is a four-piece music ensemble from Great Britain, which "blends mystical middle eastern sounds with modern technology and dance grooves, while retaining a sense of spirituality." Zohar combines Jewish cantors, Arab muezzins, and Byzantine chants to create their unique musical sound. The band is signed to Miles Copeland's Ark 21 label, and their first album, "Onethreeseven," was released worldwide in 2001 to critical acclaim. Their second album "Do You Have Any Faith?" was released in 2007. The group was founded, and is led by musician and producer Erran Baron Cohen. Zohar's music reflects the beats and textures of modern club culture, hip-hop, electronica, dub and future grooves. Zohar have also DJ'd internationally, as well as at some of London's most popular clubs including Momos, China White and Bartok. They have also performed live both in the United Kingdom, and internationally, all while establishing a dedicated body of fans in various parts of the world.

== Members ==
=== Erran Baron Cohen (trumpeter, composer, founder) ===
Erran Baron Cohen is a British composer, trumpeter, and multi-instrumentalist. Baron Cohen has a wide range of influences including, klezmer, jazz, hip-hop, rock and dance music, which he incorporates into the sound of Zohar. He is also the older brother of actor and comedian Sacha Baron Cohen. When asked about their relationship, he said, "We used to develop and perform material after Shabbat dinner in our parents' house."

Aside from Zohar, Baron Cohen has also made music for his brother's various television and film projects, namely the 2006 hit Borat: Cultural Learnings of America for Make Benefit Glorious Nation of Kazakhstan. He has also scored for other films including Sacha Baron Cohen's Brüno and The Dictator, as well as The Infidel starring Omid Djallili, and Matt Lucas. In 2008, Baron Cohen also released his solo album Erran Baron Cohen Presents: Songs in the Key of Hanukkah.

=== Avivit Caspi (vocalist) ===
Avivit Caspi (Hebrew: אביבית כספי) is Israeli-born, but is now based in London. She has performed all around the globe, in countries including, the United States, Singapore and Lithuania. Caspi has performed with both her own band, and as a part of Zohar. In 2007, Caspi performed Israel's national anthem, Hatikvah, at the England vs. Israel world cup football match, in a way that it has never been heard before. Her music is an interesting "blend of East and West, English and Hebrew, traditional and new, acoustic and electronic."

=== Johan YoYo Buys (bass) ===
Johan YoYo Buys is a bass player from South Africa, but is currently based in London, UK. Over the course of his career, Buys has worked with various different bands, and solo artists. These include artists such as, Corrina Greyson, Marcus Malone, James Stewart, eVoid, and several others. He also toured internationally supporting artists such as, Bryan Adams, Counting Crows and Buddy Guy. He was also a member of South African band "The Usual" from 1993 to 2000. Buys has worked with over 150 bands and artists on very many albums, gigs and tours.

=== Preston Heyman (drummer) ===
Preston Heyman is a British session drummer. He has played percussion and drums with many well-known artists such as, Paul McCartney, Phil Collins, Atomic Rooster, Tina Turner, Sting, Eric Clapton and many others.

== Discography ==
=== "Onethreeseven" (2001) ===
==== Track list ====
1. Ehad
2. Onethreeseven
3. Midnight at the Bazaar
4. Byzantine
5. Elokainu
6. Angel
7. The Merciful One
8. Head and Bones
9. Harmony
10. Maroc
11. Salaam
12. Sketches of Egypt

=== "Do You Have Any Faith?" (2007) ===
==== Track list ====
1. Let There Be Light
2. Do You Have Any Faith?
3. Sunrise
4. From The Silence
5. Too Much Too Soon
6. Raga
7. Un Ange En Paix
8. Red
9. Survival
10. 7th Level
