= Amazonian Guard =

Female bodyguards of Muammar Gaddafi

Revolutionary Nuns الراهبات الثوريات ar-rāhibāt ath-thawriyyāt
- Common name: the Amazons

Agency overview
- Formed: c. early 1980s
- Dissolved: 2011

Jurisdictional structure
- National agency: Libya under Gaddafi
- Operations jurisdiction: Libya under Gaddafi
- Specialist jurisdictions: Paramilitary law enforcement, counter insurgency, riot control

Operational structure
- Leader responsible: Muammar Gaddafi

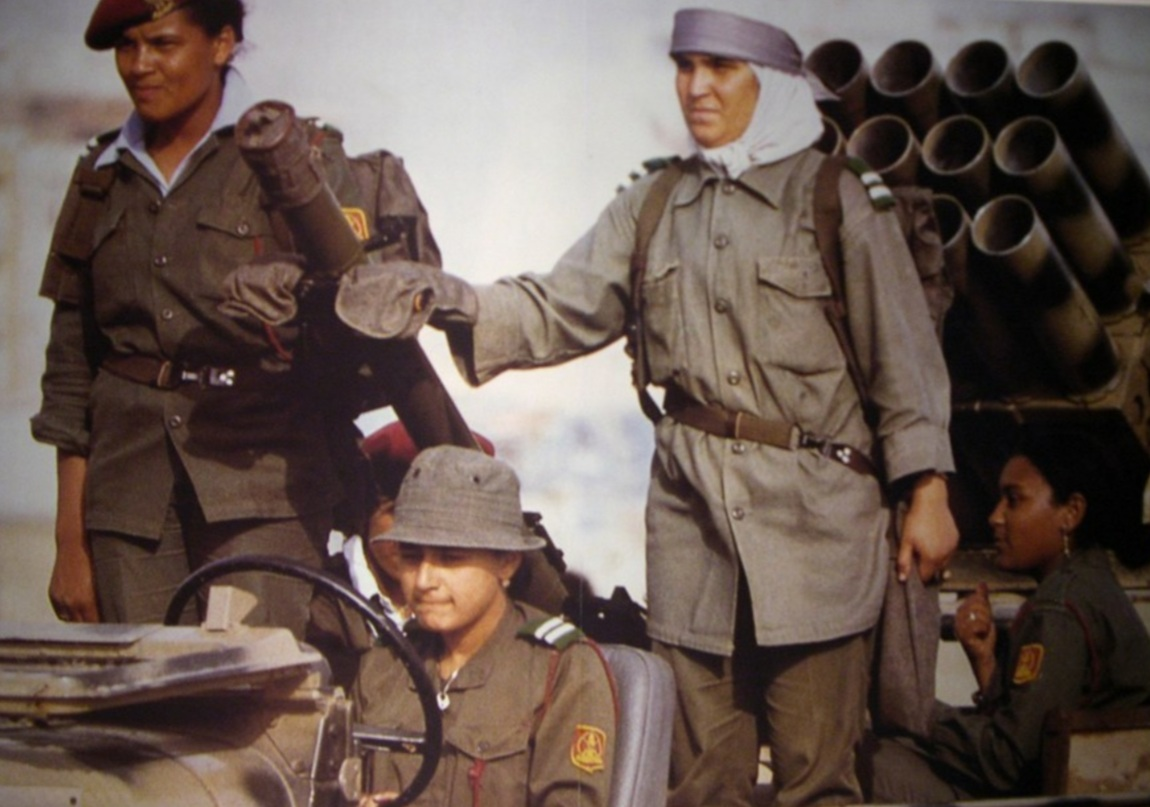
Gaddafi's bodyguards

The Amazonian Guard (also the "Amazons") was an unofficial name given to an all-female elite cadre of bodyguards officially known as the Revolutionary Nuns (Arabic: الراهبات الثوريات, ar-rāhibāt ath-thawriyyāt), tasked with protecting Muammar Gaddafi, the leader of Libya from 1969 to 2011.

== Formation ==
The group was formed in the early 1980s, after Gaddafi's official resignation as Libyan head of state in favor of the title of Brotherly Leader and Guide of the Revolution. According to Joseph T. Stanik, Gaddafi employed a cadre of female bodyguards because he believed that an Arab gunman would have difficulty firing at women. However, it has also been submitted by other authors that Gaddafi's female bodyguards were, in reality, just an aspect of the dictator's well-known eccentric showmanship and his fondness for surrounding himself with young women.

Gaddafi would usually travel with fifteen of his Amazonian Guards assigned to security or housekeeping.

== Training ==
Candidates for the Amazonian Guard participated in firearms and martial arts training at a special academy, were required to take an oath of chastity, and then were chosen by Gaddafi.

== Incidents ==
In 1998, one of Gaddafi's female bodyguards was killed and seven others were wounded when Islamic fundamentalists in Libya ambushed Gaddafi's motorcade. It was claimed that the dead guard, Aisha, was Gaddafi's favorite and threw herself across Gaddafi's body to stop the bullets.

In November 2006, as Gaddafi arrived at Nnamdi Azikiwe International Airport in Abuja, Nigeria, with a 200-strong troop of heavily armed bodyguards, a diplomatic incident was caused as security officials tried to disarm them. Gaddafi furiously walked away, gesturing that he intended to cover the 40 km (25 mi) journey to the capital on foot, and could be persuaded to yield only after intervention by Nigerian president Olusegun Obasanjo, who coincidentally was also at the airport.

== Abuse ==
In September 2012, the book Gaddafi's Harem by Annick Cojean was published, in which Gaddafi was linked to several sex scandals, including several rapes of men, women, and children. According to the book, Gaddafi raped female members of his Amazonian Guard on a daily basis.

In the latter days of the Libyan civil war, accusations emerged from five members of the Amazonian Guard of rape and other abuse by the upper echelons of the Gaddafi government, which included Gaddafi, his sons, and senior officials. Some Amazonian Guards report they were offered a choice between suicide and executing rebels.

== See also ==
- Dahomey Amazons
- The Dictator, a Sacha Baron Cohen film parodying the Guard
- Fish Speakers – a fictional all-female Army and personal bodyguard of Leto II from the novel God Emperor of Dune by Frank Herbert
- Dora Milaje – Female special forces for the fictional African nation of Wakanda from Marvel Comics
