= Mahala Rai Banda =

Romanian gypsy band

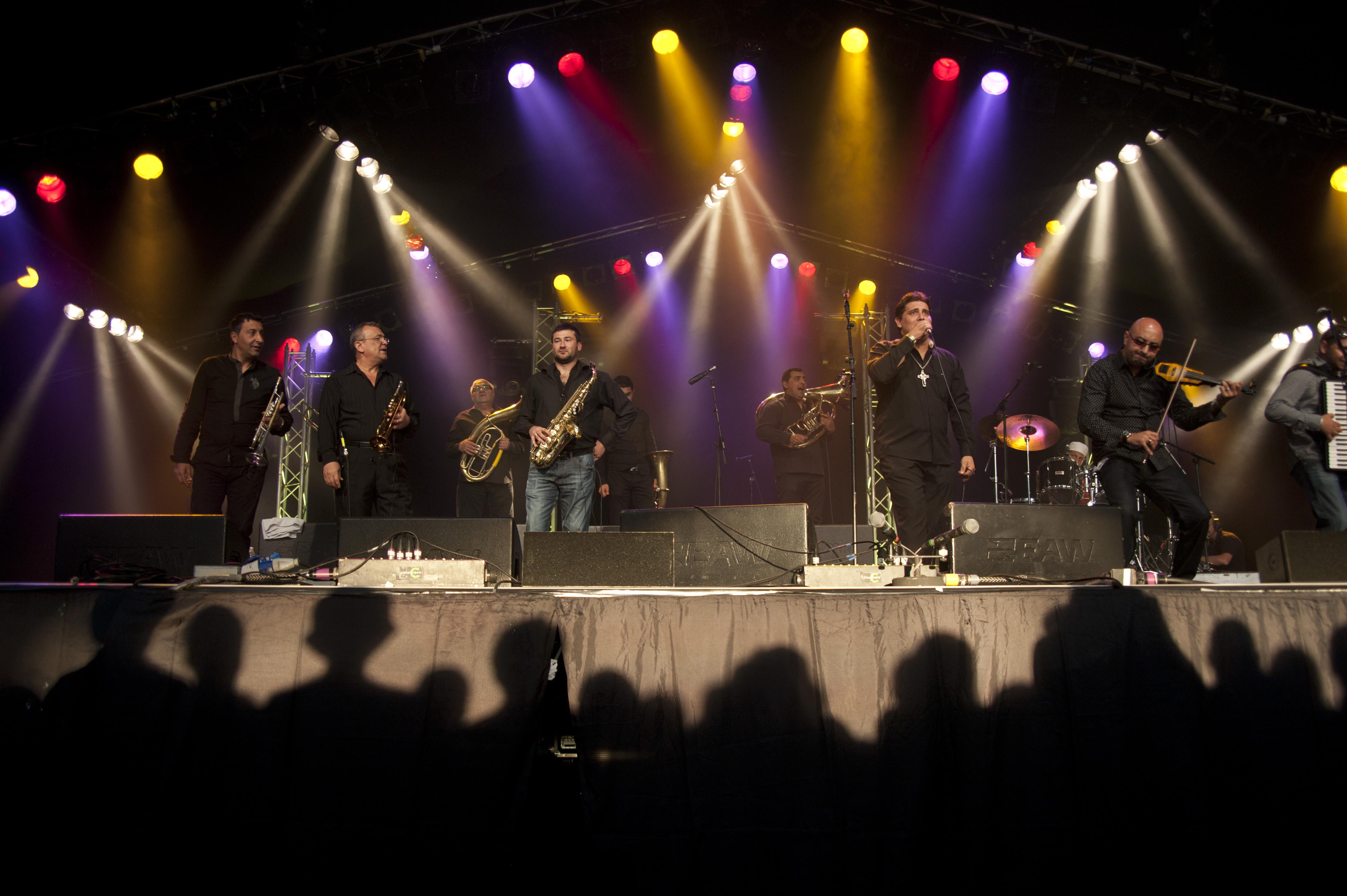

Background information
- Origin: Bucharest, Romania
- Genres: Lăutărească music, popular music
- Years active: since 2004
- Website: www.mahalaraibanda.ro

Mahala Rai Banda is a Romani band based in Bucharest (Romania). The band was formed by violinist and composer Aurel Ioniță, who originates from a family of lăutari from the village of Clejani. He is related to several members of Taraf de Haïdouks. The band plays Balkan-influenced music. Instrumentation used by the band includes violins, accordions, and brass instruments played by musicians from Zece Prăjini. Their music includes a mixture of traditional popular music and Balkan-influenced club music (Balkan Beats). Their music is known for its blend of arrangements, traditional elements, and modern approaches.

== The Debut Album ==
Mahala Rai Banda's self-titled debut album was recorded in 2004 in Bucharest, Romania. Additional production and mixing were carried out by Shantel and Marcus Darius in Frankfurt, Germany. The mix was done in collaboration with Aurel Ioniță (the band's leader) and Stéphane Karo. The album was released on Crammed Discs in early 2005.

== The Second Album ==
Mahala Rai Banda's second album “Ghetto Blasters” was recorded in 2009 in Berlin, Germany and Bucharest, Romania. The album was produced, recorded and mixed by Henry Ernst and Marc Elsner. The album was released on Asphalt Tango Records, in October 2009. The album climbed to 2nd place in the World Music Charts Europe charts, and was voted amongst the top ten "Best Albums Of The Year 2009" by Songlines (magazine).

== Achievements ==
Ever since the release of their debut album, Mahala Raï Banda has performed over 200 concerts in 26 countries, and appeared at major festivals and clubs and concert halls. Their song "Mahalageasca" (both in its original version and Shantel's remix) has appeared in the British-American feature film Borat, as well as in several other films and advertising campaigns. Their debut album climbed to Number 3 in the World Music Charts Europe Mahala Raï Banda have also had their tracks remixed and/or reworked by electronic music producers and artists such as Nouvelle Vague, Felix B (from Basement Jaxx), Balkan Beat Box, DJ Click, Russ Jones, Shantel and more. Most of these reworks appeared as part of the Electric Gypsyland album series. Mahala Raï Banda tracks have appeared on international compilations including Buddha Bar (France), Bucovina Club (Germany), Balkan Bangers and Gypsy Beats (UK), Balearic Bisquits (Denmark), Balkanology (South Africa), Rough Guide to Eastern Europe (UK), Rromanu Suno (Serbia), Balkan Beats (Germany), Barrio Latino (France), Bar Gypsy (USA), and others. Mahala Raï Banda has also formed part of THE GYPSY QUEENS AND KINGS tour since 2009, and have been featured on the 2011 platforming game LittleBigPlanet 2. The song has also been known for being used as the intro song to the Romanian animated comedy, Animat Planet Show.
