= European Center for Antiziganism Research =

Not-for-profit organization

The European Centre for Antiziganism Research (ECAR) is a not-for-profit organization dedicated to combating Antiziganism, or prejudice against Romani people, also known as Gypsies.

ECAR gained headlines worldwide when it filed a complaint with German prosecutors against the movie Borat: Cultural Learnings of America for Make Benefit Glorious Nation of Kazakhstan for defamation, and inciting violence against the Romani people.

== See also ==
- Antiziganism
