= Amsterdam Klezmer Band =

Dutch-Jewish musical group

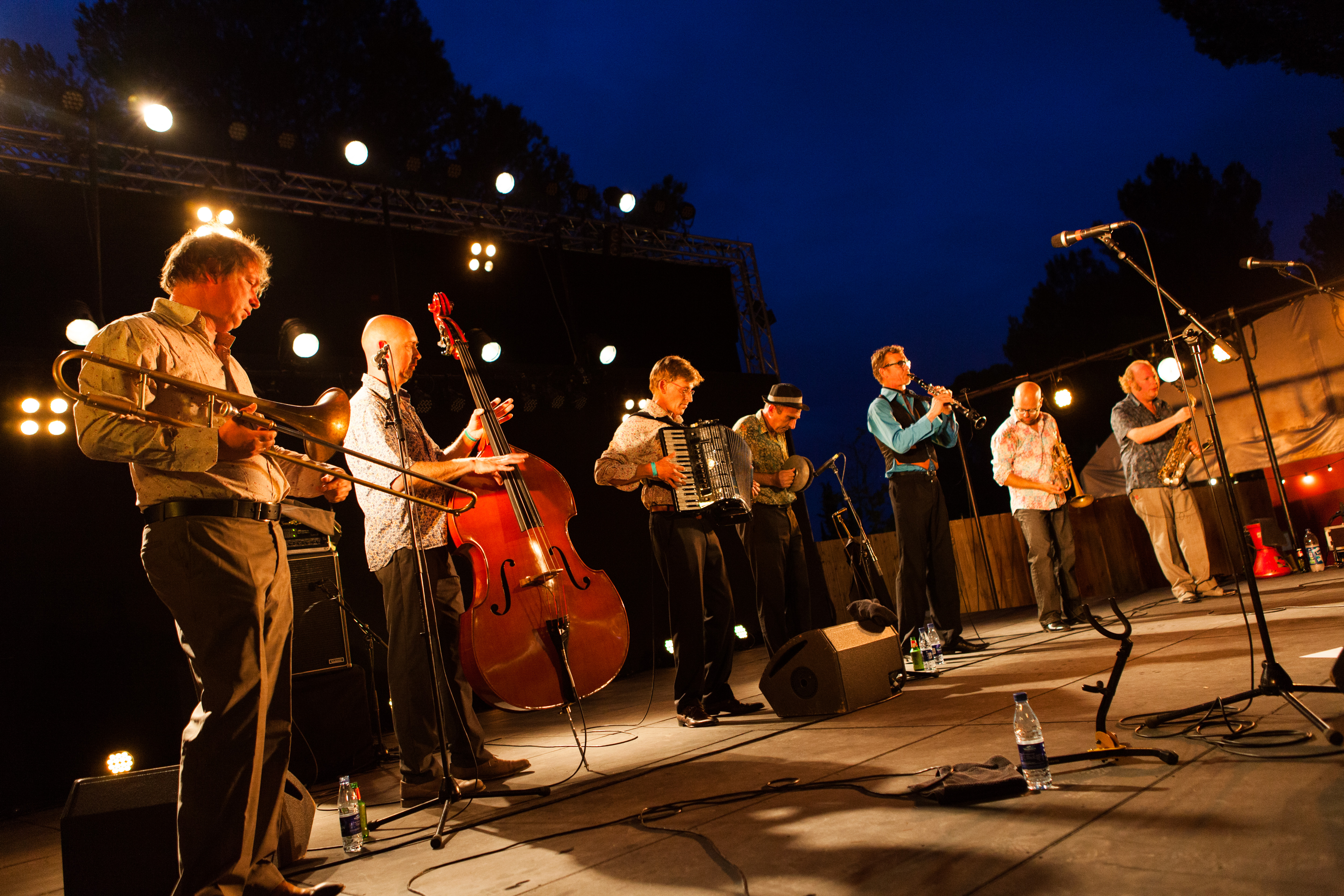
- Amsterdam Klezmer Band performing in 2015

Background information
- Also known as: AKB
- Origin: Amsterdam, Netherlands
- Genres: Klezmer; Balkan; Romani music; Jazz; Ska punk; Hip hop
- Years active: 1996–present
- Members: Jasper de Beer; Job Chajes; Alec Kopyt; Gijs Levelt; Joop van der Linden; Janfie van Strien
- Past members: Theo van Tol
- Website: Official website

Amsterdam Klezmer Band, sometimes referred to as AKB, is a Dutch-Jewish musical group created in 1996 in Amsterdam. The band plays Yiddish and Klezmer music, but also incorporates sounds from Balkan, jazz, Romani, and hip-hop music. The band has described itself as a "mini brass band", but features prominent vocals as well.

== History ==
The group formed in 1996 by saxophonist Job Chajes as a group of buskers playing Yiddish dance music in Amsterdam. The band made its name playing in parks and pubs throughout the late nineties. In the same years, the band self-released three albums, Mesjogge, Leib In De Pijp, and De Amsterdam Klezmer Band. The band's first professional arrangement was being invited to play at the Oerol Festival in 1999. They were invited back in following years and also played at the Noorderslag festival and the Lowlands festival in 2001. The band's first album produced on label came in 2000 with the release of Mala Loka through the Dutch folk music label, Syncoop Produkties. During this period, the band also went on their first tours to Slovenia, Switzerland, Italy, and Turkey.

The band was joined by Jewish-Ukrainian (from Odesa, Ukraine) singer Alec Kopyt, a specialist in prison songs, in 2001. This accompanied the band's release of Limonchitki, named for their rendition of a song of the same name by Soviet-Jewish singer Leonid Utyosov, in 2001 through Knitting Factory Records accompanied a tour of the Dutch club scene. In 2003, the band collaborated with the Galata Gypsy Band from Turkey, producing the album Katakofti through Kalan Müzik.

The band released the album Son (named for the Russian word for 'dream') in 2005 followed by a year of touring to locations worldwide including the Concertgebouw in Amsterdam and other venues in New York, Hamburg, Moscow, and Paris. The band collaborated with multiple DJs and electronic musicians in order to produce their 2006 album Remixed, featuring remixes of Amsterdam Klezmer Band tunes. The track "Sadagora Hot Dub" by German DJ Shantel ended up being a hit that was played prominently on multiple radio stations.

In 2014, the band collaborated with multiple artists on the album Blitzmash, including Brazilian singer Lílian Vieira, Alto-saxophonist Benjamin Herman, and Trumpeter Kyteman. In 2018, the band collaborated with Hungarian band Söndörgő on their album Szikra. In February 2020, AKB released Fortuna in collaboration with producer Stefan Schmid.

On 1 August 2023, the band announced that accordionist Theo van Tol had died, at the age of 66.

== Style ==
While calling themselves a Klezmer band, the Amsterdam Klezmer Band is known for their non-traditional blending of musical genres. While the band prominently focuses on Klezmer and Balkan music, they also take inspiration from Romani music, jazz, hip-hop, electronic, and ska among other genres. The band is known for dance music with their roots in Yiddish dance music, playing often at dance clubs, weddings, and music festivals. The band has music in Dutch, Yiddish, Russian, and English with their frontmen Alec Kopyt and Job Chajes singing and rapping respectively.

== Personnel ==
- Job Chajes – Alto saxophone, vocals (1996–present)
- Jasper de Beer – Double bass, guitar banjo, backing vocals (1996–present)
- Alec Kopyt – Vocals, percussion (2001–present)
- Gijs Levelt – Trumpet (1997–present)
- Joop van der Linden – Trombone, percussion (2000–present)
- Janfie van Strien – Clarinet, backing vocals (1999–present)
- Theo van Tol – Accordion (2004–2023; his death)

== Discography ==
=== Albums ===
- Mesjogge (Self-released. 1996)
- Leib In De Pijp (Self-released. 1997)
- De Amsterdam Klezmer Band (Self-released. 1999)
- Mala Loka (Syncoop Produkties. 2000)
- Limonchiki (Knitting Factory Records. 2001)
- Katakofi (Kalan Müzik. 2003) with Galata Gypsy Band
- Man Bites Dog Eats Amsterdam Klezmer Band (TryTone. 2004) with Man Bites Dog
- Son (Connecting Cultures. 2005)
- Remixed (Essay Recordings. 2006)
- Zaraza (Essay Recordings. 2008)
- Katla (Essay Recordings. 2011)
- Mokum (Essay Recordings. 2012)
- Blitzmash (Vetnasj Records. 2014)
- Benja (Vetnasj Records. 2015)
- Oyoyoy (Vetnasj Records. 2016)
- Szikra (Vetnasj Records. 2018) with Söndörgő
- Fortuna (Stichting Rettisj En Kippevet. 2020)
