= Glod, Dâmbovița =

Village in Dâmbovița County, Romania

Glod
- Village
- Location within Romania
- Coordinates: 45°14′29″N 25°27′2″E
- Country: Romania
- County: Dâmbovița County
- Elevation: 627 m (2,057 ft)

Population (2021)
  - Total: 1,849
- Time zone: UTC+02:00 (EET)
  - Summer (DST): UTC+03:00 (EEST)
- Postal code: 137312

Glod is a village in the commune of Moroeni, Dâmbovița County, Romania. As of the 2021 census, it has a population of 1,849. Its name is an archaic word for "mud" in Romanian. The village is located near the towns of Pucioasa and Fieni.

== History ==
The village was first mentioned as Obârşia Glodului ("source of Glod") in written records on 7 October 1569, placing it on the riverbed of the Puturoasa. The majority of residents are Rudari Roma, who do not speak the Romani language and settled down in Glod by the early 1900s. In December 1989, shortly before the Romanian Revolution, Glod was set to be demolished as part of the systematization programme in the greater area.

Glod is considered one of the poorest villages in Dâmbovița County. Historically, the economy of Glod was largely based on the woodcraft of tools and basket weaving, which were traded as far as Bucharest, with 90% of baskets sold at the city's George Coșbuc Market originating from Glod. During the Socialist Republic of Romania, most residents were employed by a state-owned cement factory in nearby Fieni.

During the communist era, Glod had an illiteracy rate of 20%. By 2018, the portion of illiterate and semi-literate residents stood at 50%. As of 2024, it was noted that Glod's youth attended secondary school and university at a fairly high rate, with a low number dropping out.

Glod has two Romanian Orthodox churches, Saint Nicholas Church and Saint Anthony the Great Church, as well as a Seventh-Day Adventist church. Saint Anthony the Great Church, Glod's first parish church, belongs to the Archdiocese of Târgoviște, and began construction in 2008, which completed fully on 13 September 2020. For his efforts in the process, the parish priest, Daniel Casandrescu, was granted the rank of iconom stavrofor by Metropolitan Nifon of Târgoviște.

In December 2024, there were renewed plans to expropriate property for demolition along the DN71 for expansions, which would include the entirety of Glod, with the project still in waiting as of 2026.

=== Role in Borat ===
Glod was a shooting location for the 2006 mockumentary film Borat: Cultural Learnings of America for Make Benefit Glorious Nation of Kazakhstan, representing Borat Sagdiyev's fictional home village of Kuzcek, Kazakhstan. The villagers were told the film would be a documentary about the hardships of rural village life. According to 20th Century Fox, the movie's comedic nature was obvious to everyone since it included many blatantly absurd and ridiculous scenes, such as one of a cow living inside someone's house. During the ten-day shoot, those who participated were paid a daily wage of 150,000 lei (equivalent to €4,20 or roughly four U.S. dollars). Additionally, a resident who rented out her broken down Dacia car as a prop was paid 4 million lei, while the family who provided the cow for filming was given a total of 3 million lei.

Many villagers were furious about their portrayal in the mockumentary, saying they only found out about its actual when they heard about it from national television and subsequent visits by The Mail on Sunday. Glod residents only saw the finished movie after a copy of it was given to them by their later legal team. Bogdan Mocea of Castel Film Romania claimed that the production team and star Sacha Baron Cohen each donated $5,000 to the town, paid a location fee, and bought computers and stationery supplies for the local schools, noting that the wages of the residents were double the usual rate in Romania. This was contested by local councilman Nicolae Stanciu, who stated that the film crew did not pay any administrative fees and that Glod only received a few notebooks for the school. Resident Solomon Georghe, further speculated that any additional funds spent by the film crew was taken by their Romanian crew and local officials, specifically accusing Mayor Costel Iordan, who had since remained in Târgoviște, of appropriating money.

Two residents of Glod, Nicolae Tudorache (who received a vibrator as an arm prosthesis in the film) and Spiridon Ciorbea (presented in the film as the town's mechanic and abortionist) filed a lawsuit against the film's producers after being approached by lawyer Michael Witti who recommended legal action, ultimately settling for the services of Ed Fagan. The lawsuit was thrown out by U.S. District Judge Loretta Preska in a hearing in April 2008 on the ground that the charges were too vague and nebulous to stand up to legal examination in court. When an ABC News crew visited the town the same year, they were shooed away with brooms. Spiridon later told the crew, "If I see Borat, I will kill him with my own hands."

Glod's discontent with Borat and the efforts behind the lawsuit were the subject of the 2008 documentary When Borat Came to Town (also known as Carmen Meets Borat) by Pieter van Huystee Film, in which it was acknowledged that it was hoped that the payout of a successful lawsuit could also be used to provide the village with basic amenities such as running water, paved roads, a sewage system, and overall structural renovations. According to director Mercedes Stalenhoef, she had already planned the documentary before Borat, after meeting Carmen Ciorbea (granddaughter of Spiridon Ciorbea) while on holiday in Romania, with the intended focus on Carmen's desire to leave Glod and start a new life in Spain. Although Stalenhoef initial did not want to make the movie about Borat, the subsequent media frenzy around Glod convinced her to make it the major aspect of the documentary, after Carmen changed her opinion about emigrating under the belief that Glod might improve if it received the settlement money.

In a 2026 follow-up with The Dispatch, when Ion Ciorbea, son of the late Spiridon Ciorbea, was asked what he would like to say to Sacha Baron Cohen, he stated "It's very simple. Borat needs to pay for his mistakes because he mocked us. He mocked us and he lied".
