= The Dictator =

2012 comedy film by Larry Charles

- Theatrical release poster
- Directed by: Larry Charles
- Written by: Sacha Baron Cohen; Alec Berg; David Mandel; Jeff Schaffer
- Produced by: Sacha Baron Cohen; Alec Berg; David Mandel; Jeff Schaffer; Scott Rudin; Anthony Hines; Todd Schulman
- Starring: Sacha Baron Cohen; Anna Faris; Ben Kingsley
- Cinematography: Lawrence Sher
- Edited by: Greg Hayden; Eric Kissack
- Music by: Erran Baron Cohen
- Production companies: Four By Two Films; Berg Mandel Schaffer; Scott Rudin Productions
- Distributed by: Paramount Pictures
- Release date: May 16, 2012
- Running time: 83 minutes
- Country: United States
- Languages: English; Hebrew; Arabic
- Budget: $65–100 million
- Box office: $190.2 million

The Dictator is a 2012 American political satire black comedy film directed by Larry Charles and written by Sacha Baron Cohen, Alec Berg, David Mandel and Jeff Schaffer. It stars Baron Cohen as Admiral General Aladeen – the dictator of the fictional Republic of Wadiya who visits the United States – alongside Anna Faris and Ben Kingsley.

Producers Jeff Schaffer and David Mandel said that Baron Cohen's character was inspired by real-life dictators with personality cults, such as Kim Jong Il of North Korea, Idi Amin of Uganda, Colonel Muammar Gaddafi of Libya, Bokassa I of the Central African Empire, Mobutu Sese Seko of Zaire, and Saparmurat Niyazov of Turkmenistan. Despite the Republic of Wadiya being located in real-life Eritrea, its own dictator, Isaias Afwerki, was not referenced as inspiration. The film's opening credits sarcastically dedicate it "in loving memory" to Kim Jong Il, who died in 2011.

The Dictator was released on May 16, 2012, by Paramount Pictures, and received mixed reviews from critics. It was a box office success, grossing $190 million. Some critics also accused the film of promoting Islamophobia and anti-Arabism.

== Plot ==
The Republic of Wadiya, (Note: This country is fictional. In the film's universe, it replaces the real-life country of Eritrea. In Lithuanian, the word "Wadiya" (spelt as "Vadija") means "Land of the Leader".) located in the Horn of Africa, has for two decades been ruled by dictator Omar Aladeen. Upon his death, he is succeeded by his immature son, Admiral-General Haffaz Aladeen. Aladeen surrounds himself with female bodyguards, sponsors terrorism, changes many words in the Wadiyan dictionary to "Aladeen", and develops nuclear weapons to be used against Israel. He also refuses to sell Wadiya's oil fields, a promise he made to Omar before his death. After the United Nations Security Council resolves to intervene militarily, Aladeen travels to the Headquarters of the United Nations in New York City to address the council.

Shortly after arriving, Aladeen is kidnapped by Clayton, a bodyguard hired by Aladeen's uncle Tamir Mafraad, whom Omar passed over as successor in favor of Aladeen. Tamir then replaces Aladeen with a decoy; a very dim-witted shepherd named Efawadh whom he intends to manipulate into signing a document democratizing Wadiya while opening up the oil fields to foreign interests. Aladeen escapes after Clayton accidentally burns himself to death in a failed torture attempt. When Clayton's burnt corpse is discovered, Tamir thinks that Aladeen has been killed. Meanwhile, Aladeen is practically unrecognizable, as Clayton has shaved off his beard.

Wandering through New York City in civilian clothes, Aladeen assumes the false identity of "Allison Burgers" and encounters Zoey, a human rights activist who offers him a job at her progressive, alternative-lifestyle cooperative. Aladeen refuses the offer and encounters Nadal, the former chief of Wadiya's nuclear weapons programme, whom Aladeen thought he had previously executed over an argument about the missile design. Aladeen follows him to New York's "Little Wadiya" district, which is populated by refugees from his own country, and enters a restaurant called Death to Aladeen. Aladeen recognizes some of the patrons as people he had ordered to be executed. Aladeen's true identity is almost uncovered but Nadal saves him. Nadal reveals that Aladeen has never executed anybody, as all the people who Aladeen had been ordered to be executed are simply sent into exile to the United States. Nadal agrees to help Aladeen regain his power, on the condition that Aladeen makes him head of Wadiya's nuclear programme again. Aladeen later accepts Zoey's job offer, as she is catering at the hotel where the signing will occur. Aladeen grows closer to Zoey and eventually falls in love with her. While turning around Zoey's struggling business, Aladeen begins imposing strict schedules on everyone, forming a personality cult around Zoey and intimidating an inspector into giving the store a good review.

However, Aladeen's relationship with Zoey becomes strained after he decides to reveal his true self to her; she cannot love a man who was so brutal to his people. After acquiring a new beard taken from a corpse, Aladeen ziplines into the hotel and talks to Efawadh, who was fooled into thinking that the Supreme Leader was ill. At the signing ceremony, Aladeen tears up Tamir's document in front of the media and holds an impassioned speech praising the virtues of dictatorship. However, upon seeing Zoey in the room, he declares his love for her and, knowing her strongly-held views, vows to democratize Wadiya and open up the oil fields for business, but in a way where the general populace will benefit. Furious, Tamir attempts to shoot Aladeen. Efawadh saves Aladeen, getting hit in the head in the process, but survives, and Tamir is arrested.

A year later, Wadiya holds its first democratic elections, 30 years after its independence. However, they are rigged in favor of Aladeen, (who has now added the title "President-Prime Minister" to his previous Admiral-General), who, for example, uses tanks to force people into his voting line. Afterwards, he marries Zoey, but is horrified when she breaks a glass with her foot and reveals herself to be Jewish. Aladeen's convoy now consists of eco-friendly cars; Nadal is reinstated; and Zoey reveals in an interview that she is pregnant with the couple's first child. Aladeen responds to the news by asking if Zoey is having "a boy or an abortion".

=== Unrated version ===
The unrated cut of The Dictator runs an additional 15 minutes from the original 83-minute theatrical version. Much of the added material is additional sexual content and dialogue. There is a scene following Aladeen falling asleep in the back of the store where one of his bodyguards, Etra, tries to kill him by beating him with her enlarged breasts on orders from Tamir. Another added scene is Mr. Ogden, the manager of the Lancaster Hotel, talking to Zoey at The Collective and cancelling the catering contract because of Aladeen.

== Cast ==
- Sacha Baron Cohen as Admiral General/Prime Minister Haffaz Aladeen / Allison Burgers / Ladies Washroom / Employees MustWashHands / Max Imumoccupancy 120 / and his double Efawadh
  - Rocky Citron as Baby Aladeen
  - Liam Campora as Aladeen Age 6
- Jason Mantzoukas as "Nuclear" Nadal
- Anna Faris as Zoey
- Ben Kingsley as Tamir Mafraad, Aladeen's uncle
- John C. Reilly (uncredited) as Clayton
- Bobby Lee as Mr. Lao, a PetroChina executive
- Sayed Badreya as Omar Aladeen, Haffaz Aladeen's father and predecessor
- Adeel Akhtar as Maroush
- Fred Armisen as the Death to Aladeen Restaurant waiter
- Edward Norton (uncredited) as himself
- Adam LeFevre as Man in Helicopter
- Megan Fox as herself
- Busty Heart as Etra
- Chris Elliott as Mr. Ogden
- Garry Shandling (uncredited) as Health Inspector
- Chris Parnell as News Anchor
- Aasif Mandvi as Doctor
- Rizwan Manji as Patient
- Horatio Sanz as Aide on Balcony
- Fred Melamed as Head Nuclear Scientist
- Joey Slotnick as Homeless Man
- Jessica St. Clair as Denise
- Kathryn Hahn as Pregnant Woman
- Anna Katarina as Angela Merkel
- Kevin Corrigan as Slade
- J. B. Smoove as Funeral Usher
- Sondra James as Friendly Customer
- Jon Glaser as Obnoxious Customer
- Nasim Pedrad as Female GMW Host
- Mitchell Green as Joseph
- Jenny Saldana as Hannah
- David El-Badawi as Aladeen's stunt double
- Sean T. Krishnan as Waiter/Cereal Loving Soldier

== Production ==
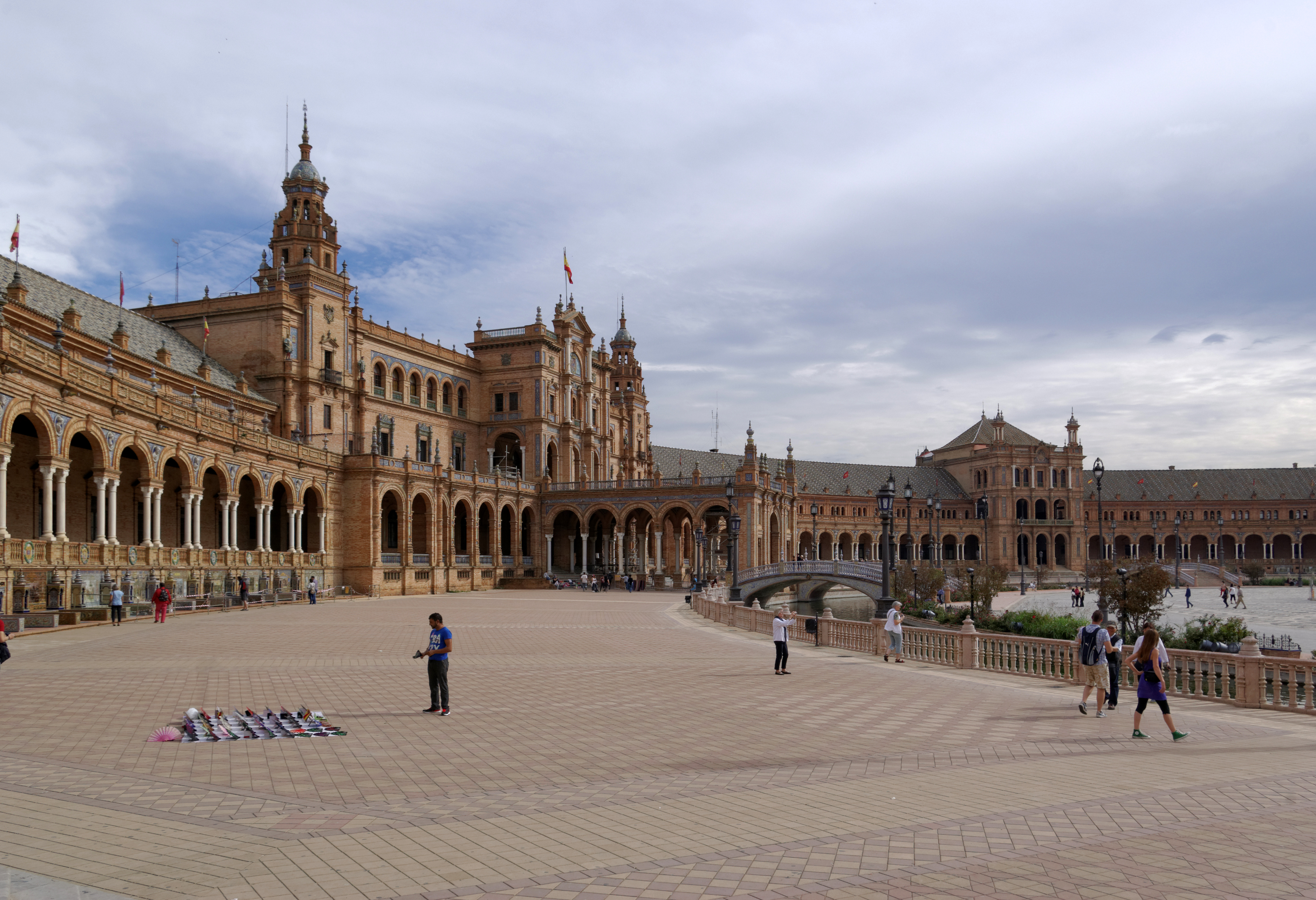
The Plaza de España served as Aladeen's palace in the movie.

Paramount Pictures described the film as "the heroic story of a North African dictator who risked his life to ensure that democracy would never come to the country he so lovingly oppressed." Paramount said the film was inspired by the novel Zabibah and the King by Iraqi President Saddam Hussein, though The New York Times later reported it is not an adaptation. Kristen Wiig and Gillian Jacobs had been considered for the role that Anna Faris eventually played and which Variety said "calls for strong improvisational skills". Baron Cohen, who also plays Efawadh in the film, based his performance primarily on Libya's Muammar Gaddafi. The film is dedicated to Kim Jong-il who died in December 2011.

Flag of Wadiya

Morocco had been considered as a filming location. Location shooting took place at the Plaza de España in Seville and on the island of Fuerteventura, Spain, and in New York City from June to August 2011. Baron Cohen said the United Nations refused to let him film scenes inside the UN headquarters and claimed they explained this by saying, "we represent a lot of dictators, and they are going to be very angry by this portrayal of them, so you can't shoot in there." When asked about it, UN Secretary-General Ban Ki-moon's spokesman commented by saying only, "Sacha Baron Cohen has a wonderful sense of humor." The UN shots were at a soundstage at Grumman Studios in Bethpage, New York.

Although Aladeen is portrayed as antisemitic and wishes to destroy Israel, the "Wadiyan" language he speaks throughout the film is actually Hebrew, as Baron Cohen is himself Jewish.

== Marketing and publicity ==
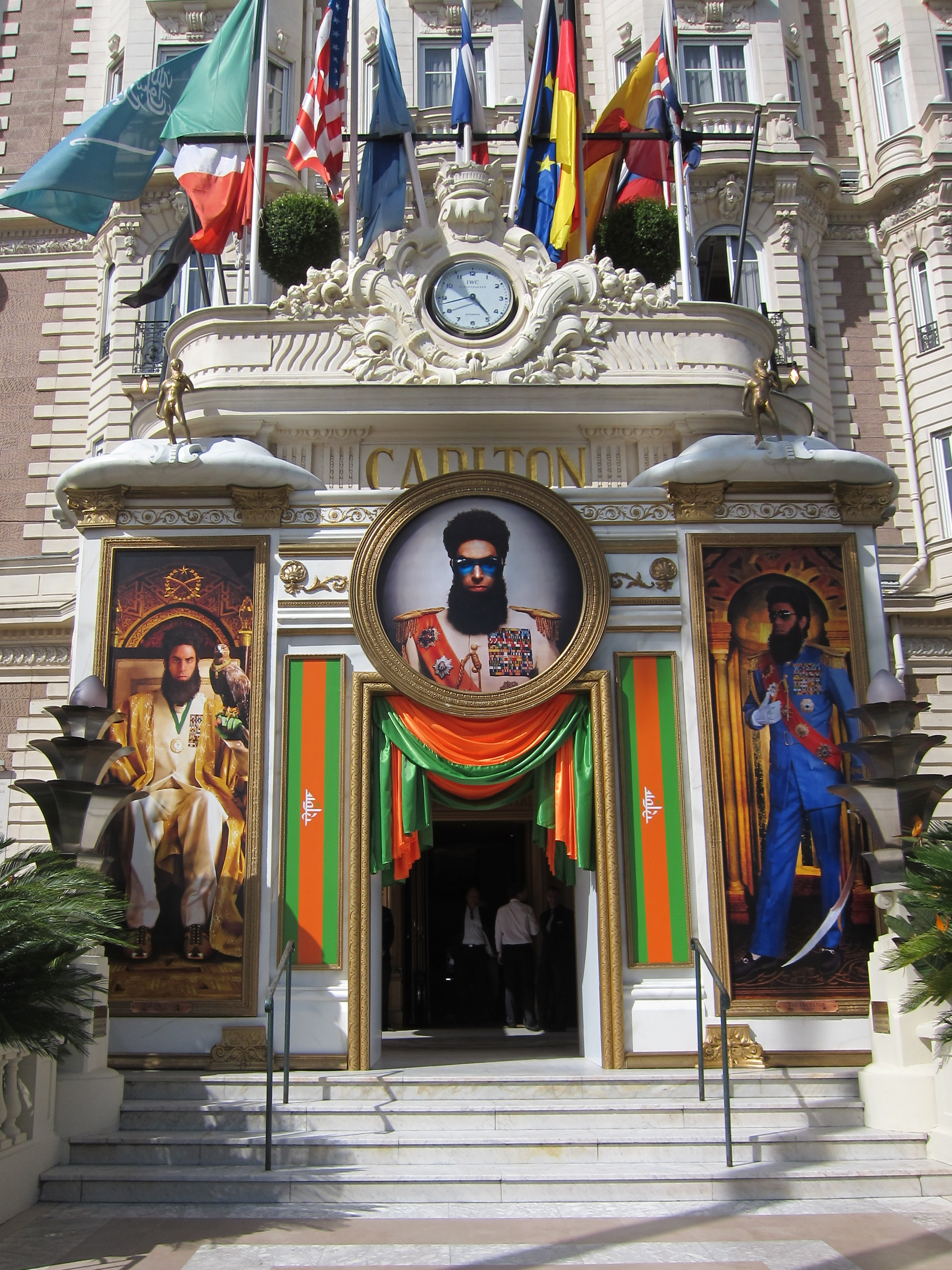
The film's showing at the 2012 Cannes Film Festival

A trailer was made for a Super Bowl XLVI commercial in February 2012. Archival news footage of Barack Obama, Hillary Clinton and David Cameron in the beginning of the trailer are excerpts of their 2011 speeches condemning Colonel Gaddafi.

Internet rumors claimed the Academy of Motion Picture Arts and Sciences had banned Baron Cohen from attending the 84th Academy Awards in his role as Admiral General Aladeen, but the academy said the rumors were unfounded, saying, "We haven't banned him. We're just waiting to hear what he's going to do", and specifying of the publicity stunt: "We don't think it's appropriate. But his tickets haven't been pulled. We're waiting to hear back." Baron Cohen eventually appeared at the awards' red carpet with a pair of uniformed female bodyguards (resembling Gaddafi's Amazonian Guard) and wielding an urn purportedly containing the ashes of North Korean dictator Kim Jong Il, which the actor spilled onto E! host Ryan Seacrest. The ashes were later reported to be pancake mix.

Baron Cohen appeared in character on the May 5, 2012, episode of Saturday Night Live during the "Weekend Update" segment, in which he appeared to torture film critics A. O. Scott and Roger Ebert to give the film positive reviews, as well as seemingly holding director Martin Scorsese hostage. Baron Cohen released a video in the wake of the 2012 French presidential election, congratulating François Hollande on his victory, and appeared in character with the pair of uniformed female bodyguards on the May 7, 2012, episode of The Daily Show.

A publicity prank involved fake invitations that arrived at mailboxes in Washington D.C., according to which "President Robert Mugabe and the Ministry of Education, Sport, Art, and Culture invite you to the Premiere of The Dictator." The screening of the film would purportedly take place at Mugabe's palace in Zimbabwe on May 12.

== Video game ==
A video game based on the movie called Wadiyan Games was released on IOS.

== Home media ==
The film was released on Blu-ray and DVD on August 21, 2012.

== Music ==
The film score was composed by Sacha Baron Cohen's brother, Erran Baron Cohen. The Dictator – Music from the Motion Picture was released on May 8, 2012, by Aladeen Records.

No.	Title	Writer(s)	Producer(s)	Length
1.	"Aladeen Madafaka (The Next Episode)" (performed by Naufalle "Aiwa" Al Wahab, El Tayeb "Mr Tibbz" Ibrahim and Admiral General Aladeen)	David Axelrod; Brian Bailey; Melvin Bradford; Calvin Broadus; Andre Young	Peter Amato; George Drakoulias	2:43
2.	"Ila Nzour Nebra" (performed by Jalal Hamdaoui and Driver)	Jalal el Hamdaoui; Driver		3:22
3.	"Habibi" (performed by Ali Hassan Kuban)	Ali Hassan Kuban		4:21
4.	"Everybody Hurts" (performed by MC Rai)	William Berry; Peter Buck; Michael Stipe; Michael Mills	Robert Berry; Erran Baron Cohen	5:28
5.	"Wahrane Wahrane" (performed by Khaled)	Ahmed Wahdi; Khaled Hadj Brahim		4:43
6.	"9 to 5" (performed by Michelle J. Nasser)	Dolly Parton	Peter Amato; Erran Baron Cohen	2:41
7.	"Goulou L'Mama" (performed by Jalal Hamdaoui and Cheb Rayan)	Jalal el Hamdaoui		4:01
8.	"The Song of Admiral General Sargeant Aladeen" (performed by Erran Baron Cohen and Omar Fadel)	Erran Baron Cohen; Omar Fadel		2:56
9.	"Let's Get It On" (performed by Mohamed Amer)	Marvin Gaye; Edward Townsend	Peter Amato; Erran Baron Cohen	1:57
10.	"Raoui" (performed by Souad Massi)	Souad Bendjael		3:46
11.	"Money's on the Dresser" (performed by Erran Baron Cohen and Jules Brookes)	Sacha Baron Cohen; Erran Baron Cohen; Alec Berg; David Mandel; Jeff Schaffer		2:45
12.	"Our Beloved Leader" (performed by The Aladeenies)			2:01
Total length:				40:44

"Mundian To Bach Ke" by Panjabi MC and Jay-Z was featured in the trailers. "Hey Baby (Drop It to the Floor)" by Pitbull was featured in the second trailer.

== Reception ==
Review aggregator Rotten Tomatoes gives the film a rating of 56% based on 219 reviews, and a rating average 5.90/10. The site's critical consensus reads, "Wildly uneven but consistently provocative, The Dictator is a decent entry in the poli-slapstick comedy genre." On Metacritic, the film was given score of 58 out of 100 based on 41 critics, indicating "mixed or average reviews". Audiences polled by CinemaScore during opening weekend gave the film an average grade of "C" on a scale ranging from A+ to F.

Roger Ebert of the Chicago Sun-Times gave the film three stars out of a possible four, saying, "The Dictator is funny, in addition to being obscene, disgusting, scatological, vulgar, crude and so on. Having seen Sacha Baron Cohen promoting it on countless talk shows, I feared the movie would feel like déjà vu. But no. He establishes a claim to be the best comic filmmaker now working. And in a speech about dictatorships, he practices merciless political satire." Slant Magazine conversely concluded, "bound to be one of the year's biggest comedy letdowns, The Dictator doesn't so much stir hot-button issues as showcase a great satirist off his game." Keith Uhlich of Time Out approved, giving it four stars out of five, and calling the opening scenes in the film "a brisk, hilarious jeremiad" and its ending monologue "a rousing, uproarious climactic speech worthy of both Chaplin and Team America."

Several reviews noted that the Marx Brothers' 1933 film, Duck Soup, inspired parts of Baron Cohen's 2012 film. Scott Tobias of The A.V. Club noted that "Admiral General Aladeen and Rufus T. Firefly share the same bloodline, representing a more generalized contempt for world leaders of any stripe, whether they don a 'supreme beard' or a greasepaint moustache." Scott Wilson of the Nashville Scene detected "an echo here of that funniest of xenophobe-baiting funnies, Duck Soup." Peter Travers of the Rolling Stone claimed that Baron Cohen's film "dodges soothing convention and ultimately merits comparisons to the Marx Brothers' Duck Soup and Charlie Chaplin's The Great Dictator."

The Irish Examiner wrote that "Sacha Baron Cohen atones for the sins of 'Bruno' with this gleefully bad-taste fish-out-of-water comedy, which kicks sand in the eye of political correctness" and that "no subject is off limits – the September 11 attacks, rape, sexual equality, Judaism – and Larry Charles's film tramples merrily over social taboos, hitting more targets than it misses as the titular despot runs amok in the capitalist playground of New York City."

The Times argued that "with The Dictator, Sacha Baron Cohen makes a radical break with the comedic style of his past films. Gone is the con-man comedian, fooling celebrities and the public with fictional characters. Gone, too, is the mockumentary style that he and his director on Borat, Bruno and now this film, Larry Charles, made their own. The Dictator is the kind of conventional feature that Peter Sellers, Tony Hancock or even Mike Myers could have made." The publication also claimed that "it's likely to offend prudes of both the sexually and politically correct persuasions."

The Washington Post wrote that "[Baron] Cohen has thankfully dispensed with ambushing real-life people for squirm-inducing interviews. But an early stunt involving a Wii game based on the 1972 Munich Olympics falls flatter than a stale matzo, a running gag about Hollywood stars selling sexual favors quickly loses steam and it can be stipulated that rape jokes simply aren't funny."

== Controversies ==
The film is banned in several member-countries of the Commonwealth of Independent States (CIS), in particular nations with real-life leaders commonly described as dictators. In Belarus, there is said to be an informal ban on showing the film, but state officials denied this referring to a shortage of cinemas equipped to show the film, which was distributed exclusively in digital format. Authorities in Tajikistan concluded The Dictator was incompatible with the nation's "mentality". As for other states, the film was described as "unlikely" to be shown in Turkmenistan, shortened to 71 minutes by the censorship in Uzbekistan, and banned from screens two weeks after its premiere in Kazakhstan.

Outside of the CIS, only the censored version of the film was released in Pakistan, and the film was reportedly blocked from cinemas in Malaysia. In Italy, the reference to the "Italian Prime Minister" in the scene with Megan Fox was substituted by a generic "politician" to avoid reference to the then-president of the Council of Ministers of the Italian Republic, Silvio Berlusconi.

=== Islamophobia and anti-Arabism ===
The film has been described by some critics as being Islamophobic, particularly noting the pronounced stereotype of Middle Eastern dictators, who are mostly Muslims. It is also reported to negatively portray stereotypical views about Arabs through visual symbols and attributes within characters and settings. Aladeen himself portrays a stereotypical Muslim Arab ruler identity, despite Aladeen not actually being Arab; his iconic beard and traditional Middle Eastern traits are things that allow audiences to link his character to Arabs and Muslims. It was suggested this character's image is also linked to terrorism as the film shows an image of Osama bin Laden that Aladeen resembles, and the film jokes that there is a close friendship between the two. Critics argued this negative depiction of an Arab leader further reinforces the idea of Arabs as "barbaric" terrorists.

Critics suggest the film further allows for the generic and stereotypical ideas of Muslims and Arabs as backwards, which can be seen through the visual comparisons between the West and the East. For instance, during Aladeen's visit to New York, he and his men arrive riding camels, whereas the background of the city depicts cars and other modern modes of transportation. Furthermore, it has been argued that Aladeen's hyper-sexuality, particularly the scenes where he is surrounded by his "harem" support a stereotypical image of an exotic East where woman serve as "slaves" to their master.

Wadiya was suggested by critics as a generalized idea of "the Orient" and that Wadiya's flag, which can be argued resembles the flag of Iraq, places "the Orient" in conflict with the West. This is also reflected through Aladeen's intention of developing nuclear weapons to use against Western nations and Israel, which highlights the anxiety of Muslim Arab nations as dangerous to the West, according to some negative critiques of the film.

== See also ==
- Coming to America, a film starring Eddie Murphy as an African prince who travels to the United States and falls in love with an American woman.
- The Great Dictator, Charlie Chaplin's 1940 satire of German dictator Adolf Hitler. It also features a double of the dictator but its final monologue is in praise of democracy.
- The Interview, Seth Rogen and James Franco's 2014 satire of North Korean dictator Kim Jong-un.
