= Paul Glod =

American football player and coach (1919–2004)

Biographical details
- Born: April 10, 1919; Gillespie, Pennsylvania, U.S.
- Died: April 24, 2004 (aged 85); North Huntingdon, Pennsylvania, U.S.

Playing career
- 1941: West Virginia Wesleyan
- 1946: Marietta
- Position: Halfback

Coaching career (HC unless noted)
- 1947–1949: Marietta
- 1956: Chadron State
- 1959: Frostburg State (assistant)
- 1960: Earlham

Head coaching record
- Overall: 18–20–1

Paul S. "Mikey" Glod (April 10, 1919 – April 24, 2004) was an American college football player and coach. He served as the head football coach at Marietta College in Marietta, Ohio from 1947 to 1949, Chadron State College in Chadron, Nebraska in 1956 and at Earlham College in Richmond, Indiana in 1960, compiling a career college football coaching record of 18–20–1. Glod played college football Mariett, and in 1947, he was named the head football coach at his alma mater, making him the youngest head coach in school history. He completed his tenure at Marietta with a record of 8–15. Good was hired as an assistant football coach at Frostburg State University in Frostburg, Maryland in 1959.

Glod died on April 24, 2004, at his home in North Huntingdon, Pennsylvania.

== Head coaching record ==
=== Football ===
Year	Team	Overall	Conference	Standing	Bowl/playoffs
Marietta Pioneers (Ohio Athletic Conference) (1947–1949)
1947	Marietta	2–5	1–3	T–15th	
1948	Marietta	4–4	1–1	T–7th	
1949	Marietta	2–6	0–2	13th	
Marietta:		8–15	2–6		
Chadron State Eagles (Nebraska College Conference) (1956)
1956	Chadron State	5–2–1	3–2–1	4th	
Chadron State:		5–2–1	3–2–1		
Earlham Quakers (NAIA independent) (1960)
1960	Earlham	5–3			
Earlham:		18–20–1			
Total:		18–20–1			
