= Moroeni =

- Commune
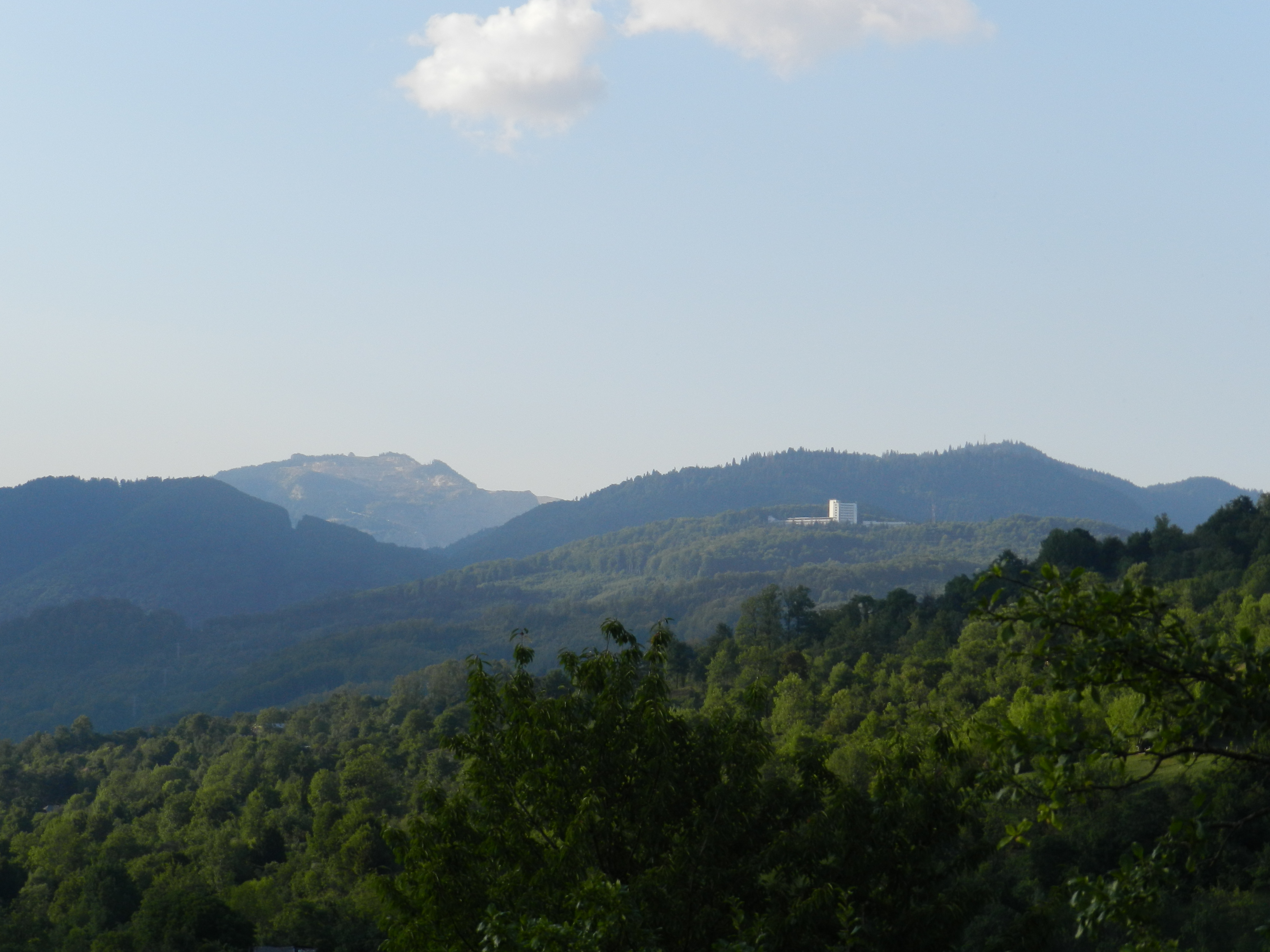
- The Moroeni Sanatorium

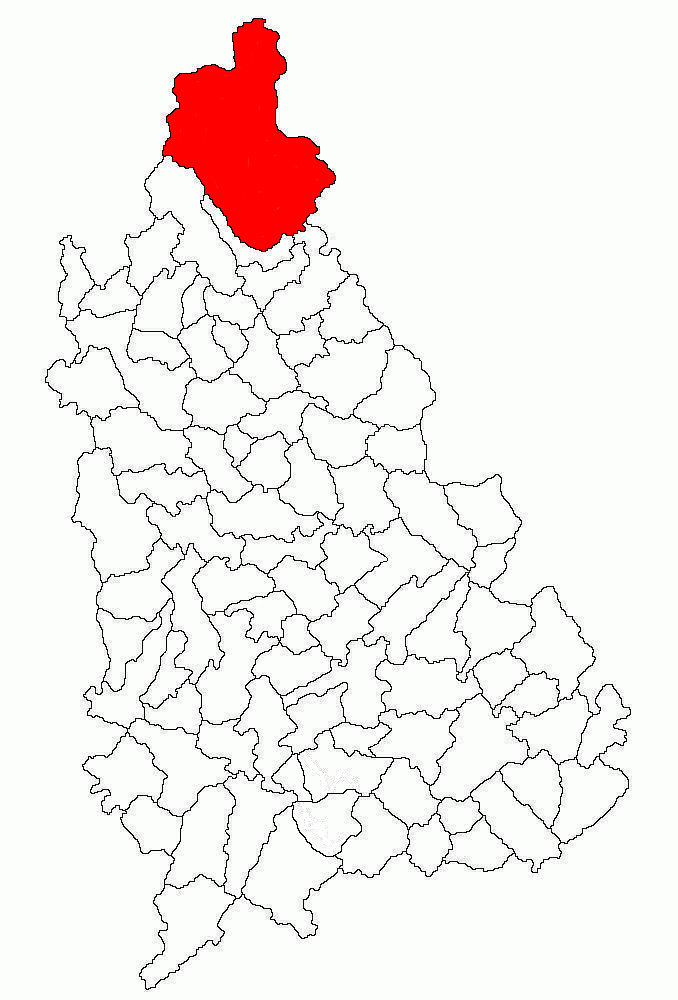
- Location in Dâmbovița County

- Location in Romania
- Coordinates: 45°14′29″N 25°27′2″E
- Country: Romania
- County: Dâmbovița

Government
  - Mayor (2020–2024): Mihai-Laurențiu Moraru (PSD)
- Area: 287.39 km^{2} (110.96 sq mi)
- Elevation: 545 m (1,788 ft)
- Highest elevation: 2,505 m (8,219 ft)
- Population (2021-12-01): 5,034
  - Density: 17.52/km^{2} (45.37/sq mi)
- Time zone: UTC+02:00 (EET)
  - Summer (DST): UTC+03:00 (EEST)
- Postal code: 137310
- Area code: +(40) 245
- Vehicle reg.: DB
- Website: primariamoroeni.ro

Moroeni, also spelled Moroieni, is a commune in Dâmbovița County, Muntenia, Romania. It is composed of six villages: Dobrești, Glod, Lunca, Moroeni, Mușcel, and Pucheni.

The commune is located at the northern extremity of the county, covering the southern end of the Bucegi Mountains. The Ialomița River, which has its source just north of Moroeni, flows through it.

Historical population
Year	Pop.	±%
2002	5,120	—
2011	5,227	+2.1%
2021	5,034	−3.7%
Source: Census data
