= In My Country There Is Problem =

Song by Sacha Baron Cohen

"In My Country There is Problem (Throw the Jew Down the Well)"

Song by Sacha Baron Cohen, Anthony Hines

from the album Stereophonic Musical Listenings That Have Been Origin in Moving Film "Borat: Cultural Learnings of America for Make Benefit Glorious Nation of Kazakhstan"
- Published: 2004 (Da Ali G Show), 2006 (album)
- Genre: Country, comedy
- Length: 2:17
- Songwriter: Sacha Baron Cohen

"In My Country There Is Problem", also known as "Throw the Jew Down the Well" after the song's key line, is a song written by English comedian Sacha Baron Cohen for his comic character Borat Sagdiyev. It features in the episode "Peace" of the series 3 of Da Ali G Show, in the 'Country Music' segment of "Borat's Guide to the USA (Part 2)", that focuses heavily on the positive reaction of the patrons of a honky-tonk in Tucson, Arizona, to the antisemitic sentiments of the song. It appeared in Stereophonic Musical Listenings That Have Been Origin in Moving Film "Borat: Cultural Learnings of America for Make Benefit Glorious Nation of Kazakhstan".

== Background and content ==
"In My Country There Is Problem"
A 25 second sample displaying the antisemitism and crowd involvement in the song

Baron Cohen's character Borat is a simple-minded antisemitic and antiziganistic Kazakh journalist who is depicted in Da Ali G Show as attempting to learn about the culture of the United Kingdom and, in the HBO series, the United States. In interviews, Baron Cohen, who is Jewish, has stated that the purpose of Borat was both to expose antisemitism in his interview subjects, as well as simple indifference to antisemitism. Baron Cohen, as Borat, displays his character's fear and hatred of Jews frequently on the show.

The song itself is a country-style song played on acoustic guitar, consisting of three verses. The first verse is a complaint about the state of transport in Kazakhstan, which is followed in a refrain with a call to "throw transport down the well—so my country can be free." The second verse is directed at the Jews of Kazakhstan, alleging they "take everybody's money", and calling for the listeners to "throw the Jew down the well". The third verse contains a warning for the listener to "be careful of [the Jew's] teeth" before repeating the second refrain.

== Appearances ==
Borat debuted the song in the third episode of the third season of Da Ali G Show, "Peace", on HBO on 1 August 2004, as the climax of the character's investigation of country music. He sang the song at a country music club in Tucson, Arizona. By the end of the song, much of the club's patronage was cheering and singing along.

== Reception ==
The Jewish Daily Forward interviewed some of the audience members and found that many understood that the song was a joke and that Borat was a comedian in disguise. Borat's full performance lasted two-and-a-half hours, during which he also sang about throwing his wife and family down a well. A Jewish audience member shown laughing in the HBO clip said, "You could tell right away it was a wig he was wearing, and a fake mustache. I would say 99% of the people in here saw that, too."

Rolling Stone called the skit "the most famous, comically potent moment of Da Ali G Show."

Jody Rosen, writing for Slate, wrote that Borat managed to offend everyone:

... Borat's performance of "In My Country There Is Problem (Throw the Jew Down the Well)" on an episode of Da Ali G Show [is] a densely packed piece of sociopolitical parody: an incitement to pogrom ("Throw the Jew down the well/So my country can be free/You must grab him by his horns/Then we have a big party") sung by a British Jew disguised as a Central Asian bumpkin before a whooping, Bud-swilling audience at a Tucson, Ariz., honky-tonk. It's hilarious. It's catchy. And it's a perfect distillation of Borat's satirical attack, designed to offend and indict just about everyone: Old Europe and Middle America, fulminating right-wingers and piously PC liberals, in addition to Kazakhstan's President Nursultan Nazarbayev and Anti-Defamation League director Abraham Foxman.

The Anti-Defamation League sent Baron Cohen an open letter warning him that, while they understood the message he had intended the sketch to deliver, they were concerned that this aspect may not have been grasped by his audience.

Columnists David Brooks and Charles Krauthammer said that the song, rather than being biting satire, was "a supreme display of elite snobbery reveling in the humiliation of the hoaxed hillbilly."
