= Kočani Orkestar =

Brass band from North Macedonia

Kočani orkestar
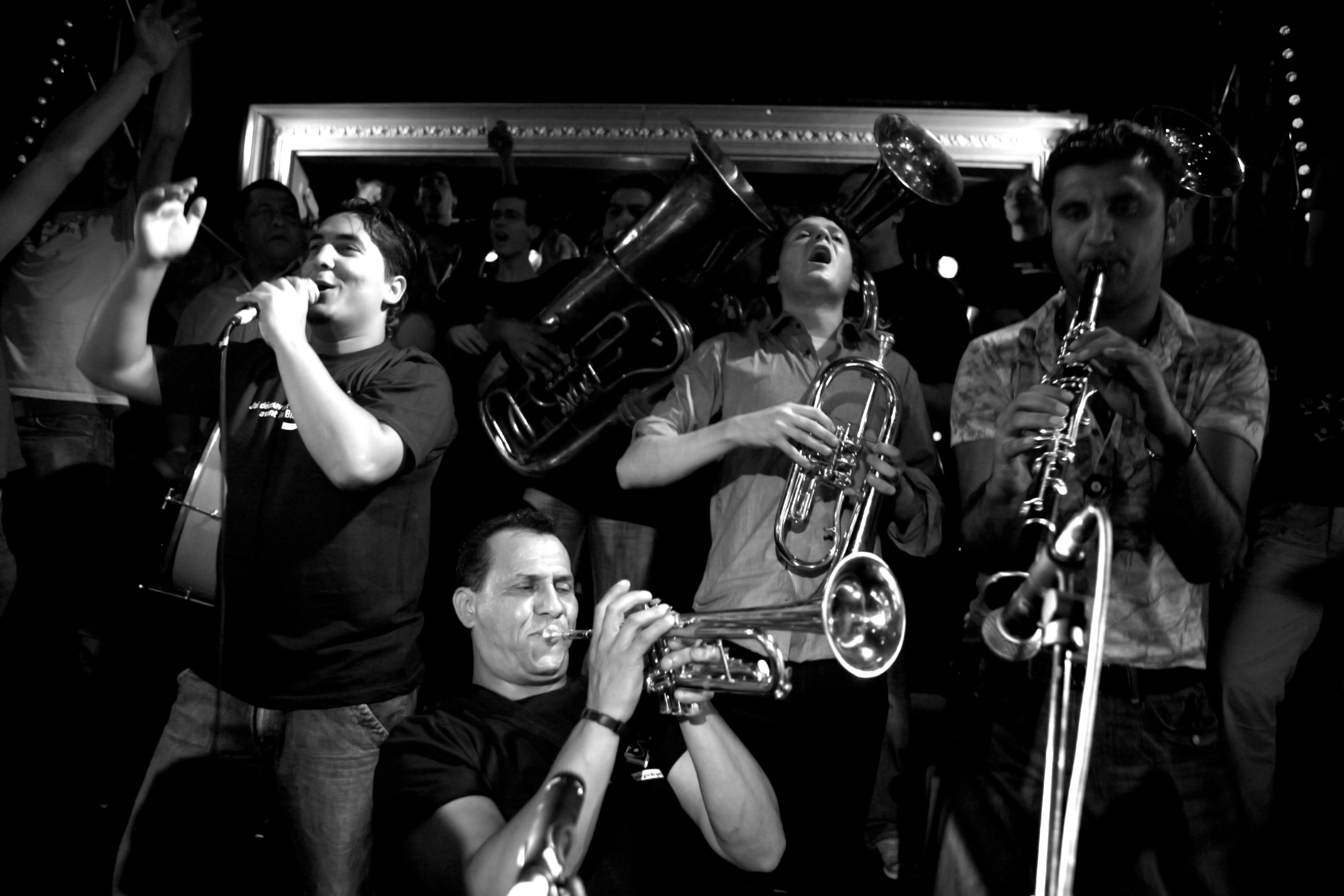
- Kočani Orkestar performing with Beirut

Background information
- Origin: Kočani, North Macedonia
- Genres: Balkan Brass Band; Balkan Music; Romani music
- Years active: 1994-present
- Labels: Crammed Discs; Divano Productions
- Members: Saban Jasarov; Redzai Durmisev; Nijazi Alimov; Sukri Zejnelov; Suad Asanov; Ajnur Azizov; Durak Demirov; Turan Gaberov; Sukri Kadriev; Dzeladin Demirov
- Past members: Naat Veliov

Kočani orkestar (in Macedonian: Кочани оркестар, also credited under the names: Kocani orkestar, Kocani Orchestra, Kochani orkestar and Kochani Orchestra) is a Macedonian Romani brass band from Kočani, North Macedonia led till 2000 by Naat Veliov. Kočani orkestar are a direct descendant of the music once played by Turkish army bands. Their music is based on Romani music from various parts of the Balkans and on Turkish rhythms, with a sprinkle of Latin flavour.

== Borat lawsuit ==
The Kočani Orkestar song "Siki, siki baba", from the album Alone At My Wedding, is featured on the soundtrack for the movie Borat: Cultural Learnings of America for Make Benefit Glorious Nation of Kazakhstan although it has no connection to the Music of Kazakhstan. Together with the Romani singer Esma Redžepova, who claimed that her song "Chaje Šukarije" had been used without authorization, Naat Veliov filed a lawsuit for the producers of the movie for an unauthorised use of the song. Despite Redžepova demanding €800,000 ($1,000,000) in compensation from the producers of the film, she only received a €26,000 compensation, as her producers had authorized the song's use in the film without notifying her.

== Discography ==
Albums

- A Gypsy Brass Band (1995)
- L'Orient Est Rouge (1998)
- Gypsy Mambo (1999)
- Ulixes (2001) with the Harmonia Ensemble
- Alone At My Wedding (2002)
- The Ravished Bride (2008)

Contributing artist

- The Rough Guide to the Music of Eastern Europe (1999, World Music Network)

== Members ==
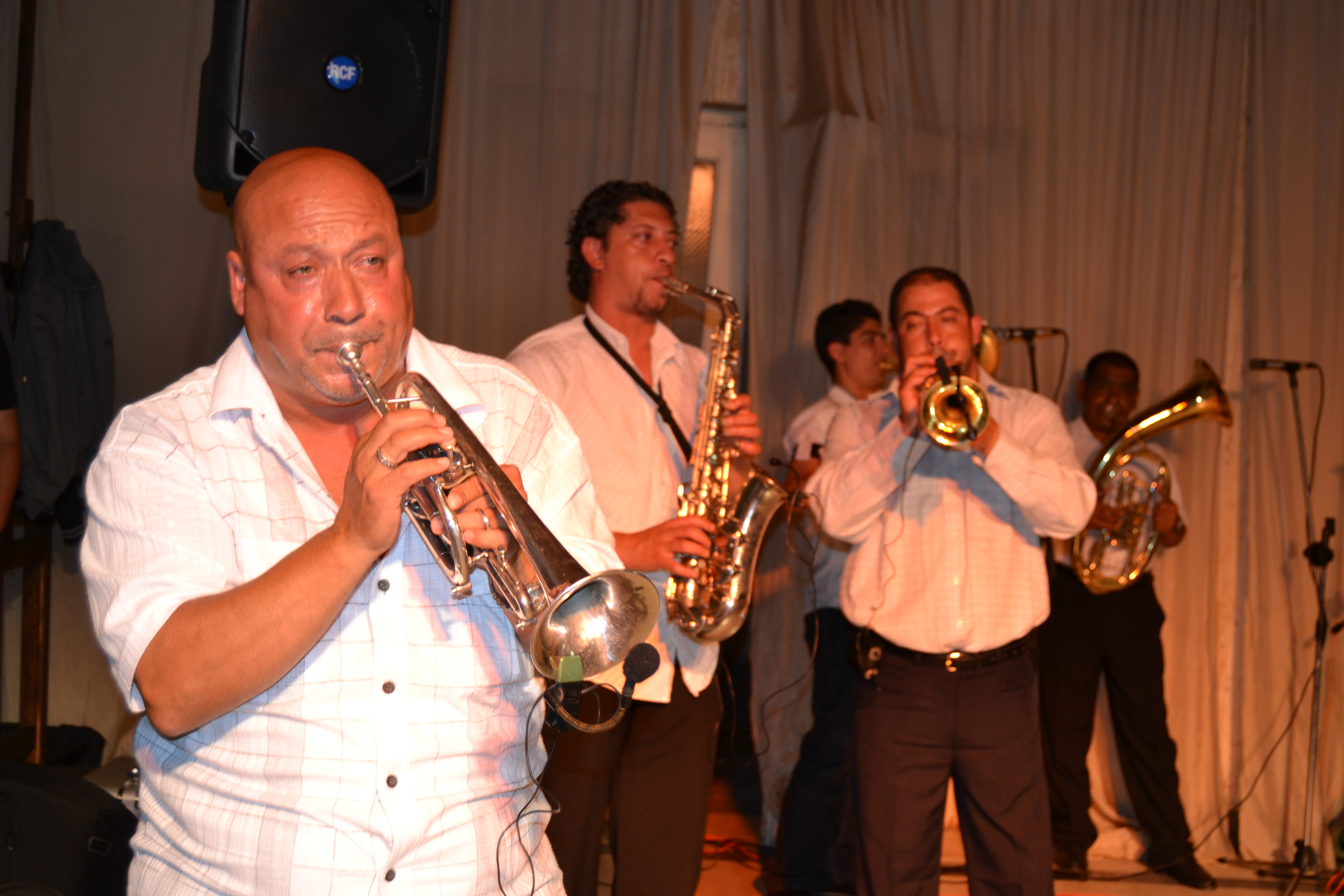
Kočani orkestar in action

- Vocals

Ajnur Azizov - in Macedonian, Turkish and Roma

- Percussion

Saban Jasarov

- Tuba

Redzai Durmisev
Nijazi Alimov
Sukri Zejnelov
Suad Asanov

- Saxophone

Durak Demirov

- Trumpet

Turan Gaberov
Sukri Kadriev

- Clarinet

Dzeladin Demirov

- Accordion

Vinko Stefanov

== See also ==
- Balkan Music
- Esma Redžepova
- Romani music
- Romani people
- Music of North Macedonia
