= Ali Hassan Kuban =

Egyptian musician (born 1929)

- Born: 1929; Qawra, Egypt
- Died: 2001 (aged 71–72)
- Education: Nasiriyah Primary School
- Occupation: Musician
- Years active: 1947–2001

Ali Hassan Kuban علي حسن كوبان (1929, Qurta, Egypt – 2001) was a Nubian singer and bandleader. He was known as the "Captain" or (later) "Godfather" of Nubian music.

== Early life ==
Ali Hassan Kuban was born in 1929 in the village of Qawra in Old Nubia to a father who worked in trade. His father loved singing, so his son acquired his love of singing from him.

Ali Kuban and his family moved to Cairo in 1944 where he joined the Nasiriyah Primary School in the Maarouf neighborhood. Kuban started his musical career singing nationalist songs at weddings to the approval and admiration of the attendees. This encouraged him to work in the field of Nubian singing, so he left his studies and joined the Nubian Scouts in Abdeen in 1947, where he learned the fundamentals of music, especially Western music, and playing the clarinet.

In 1949, Coban participated in the operetta The Nubian Wedding at the Cairo Opera House in front of King Farouk and Al-Nahhas Pasha at the Khedive Opera House in 1949. He also played girba (bagpipes) with his own band during wedding celebrations. Kuban gained the king's admiration even though his role was small. The king granted him a silver riyal as a reward and ordered him to be assigned to train the royal scout teams in Anshas.

== Career ==
During the 1950s, Kuban began adding Western instruments such as the saxophone, electric guitar, bass guitar, organ, trumpet and accordion to his ensemble. In 1957, Ali Kuban formed the first band of its kind in Egypt for Nubian music, and it performed concerts and weddings and participated in national events in Egypt and abroad. The band also presented Nubian heritage songs in a new form and arrangement after Kuban developed the musical instruments in the band, as he introduced the accordion, violin, tromba, saxophone, and keyboard. Despite this, the band did not deviate from its Nubian spirit, and the Egyptian Army had him to perform concerts for soldiers. In 1967, he went to the front of the Six-Day War and sang for the soldiers to raise their morale after the June setback.

In 1988, a delegation of German musicians interested in music and singing came to contract with him to perform several concerts in Germany. These concerts were very successful and attracted the attention of the world to him. The International Federation of Festivals offered him participation in the Berlin International Festival in 1989, in which Kuban won first place. In the same year, he obtained membership in the International Union of Musicians in Berlin. In 1990, he participated in the Politics Festival in Germany, where he also won first place, and the Egyptian embassy in Germany at the time held a large party for him.

In the same year, he gave a distinguished performance during the activities of the annual festival (Homeland Ringtones) in Berlin, during which he achieved unparalleled public success. German newspapers praised him and said that he combines the original melody with the modern direction of music that attracts audiences in the West. Kuban's song "The Nile" is what prompted James Brown to ask Kuban to participate with him in a group of concerts in the United States of America and some Arab countries. He achieved great fame and was honored and warmly welcomed.

The French Opera also invited him to sing with the accompaniment of the French orchestra. A delegation from French television came to Egypt and filmed a documentary film about Kuban in his hometown of Qawra.

Kuban also participated in many concerts and festivals in Italy, Switzerland, Austria, the Netherlands, and the United States of America. He received many awards and certificates of appreciation from his travels and concerts. The international media highlighted his role and status, and the management of the 27th World Music Festival hosted him in the French city of Cannes. By the 1990s, he was performing for international audiences at events such as Midem (1993), WOMAD (1994), the Montreal Jazz Festival (1994), and Central Park Summer Stage (1995).

== Death ==
Kuban died in June 2001 in silence and calm after enriching the artistic scene with the Nubian musical and lyrical style. The international media was interested in the news of his death and broadcast long segments about him and clips from some of his songs that he performed throughout his artistic career, which lasted about 40 years. His fame spread throughout the world and he won many international awards, the most important of which was his winning the Golden Record at the annual German Folklore Festival in 1990, in which he participated as a representative of Egypt.

== Discography ==
Albums

- From Nubia to Cairo (1980), Shanachie – reissued 2001, Piranha
- Walk Like a Nubian (1991), Piranha
- Nubian Magic (1995), Mercator – reissued 1999, Blue Flame
- Real Nubian: Cairo Wedding Classics (2001), Piranha
- The Rough Guide to Ali Hassan Kuban (2002), World Music Network – compilation

Contributing artist

- The Rough Guide to World Music (1994), World Music Network
- The Rough Guide to the Music of North Africa (1997), World Music Network
