= Erran Baron Cohen =

English composer and musician (born 1968)

Erran Boaz Baron Cohen
- Born: May 1968 (age 58)
- Origin: England
- Occupations: Musician; composer
- Instrument: Trumpet
- Member of: Zohar

Erran Boaz Baron Cohen (born May 1968) is an English composer and trumpet player known for collaborations with his younger brother, Sacha Baron Cohen.

== Career ==
Baron Cohen is a founding member of the world music group Zohar, who are signed to Miles Copeland's Ark 21 label. He wrote the scores to his brother's films Borat, Brüno, The Dictator, and Grimsby, as well as his TV series Da Ali G Show and Who Is America?

After scoring the Borat movie, Baron Cohen was asked by the Turan Alem Kazakhstan Philharmonic Orchestra to compose a classical piece containing Kazakh influences.

== Film, television, and stage scores ==
- Borat (2006)
- Brüno (2009)
- The Infidel (2010)
- The Dictator (2012)
- Just Before I Go (2014)
- The Contract (2015)
- Grimsby (2016)
- The Bromley Boys (2019)
- Borat Subsequent Moviefilm (2020)
- The Merchant of Venice 1936, Trafalgar Theatre, London (2025)
