= Shantel =

German DJ and producer (born 1968)

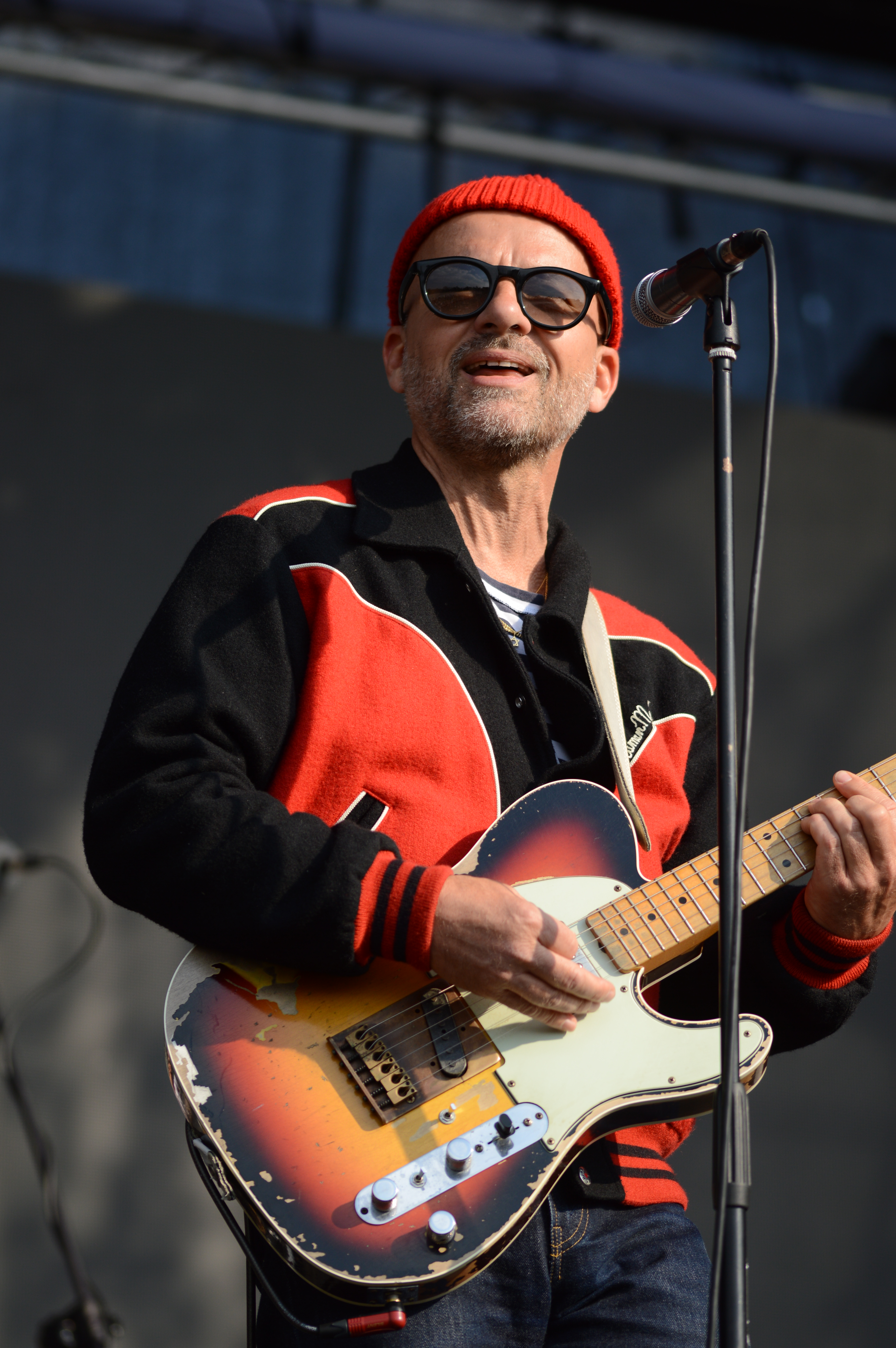
- Shantel in Wrocław, 2022

Background information
- Born: Stefan Hantel; 2 March 1968 (age 58); Mannheim, West Germany
- Genres: Electronic, trip hop

Stefan Hantel (born 2 March 1968), better known by his stage name Shantel, is a German DJ and producer based in Frankfurt. He is known for his work with Romani brass orchestras, DJing and remixing traditional Balkan music with electronic beats.

== Background and early life ==
Shantel is of Greek descent on his paternal side. His maternal grandparents were Ukrainian Jews from Chernivtsi.

== Career ==
Shantel began his DJ career in Frankfurt, Germany, and was inspired by the audience reaction to Romani brass bands such as Fanfare Ciocărlia and trumpeter Boban Marković to infuse electronically tweaked Balkan Romani music into his DJ sets. Shantel released two compilations of his popular DJ night, Bucovina Club, on his own Essay label, which won the Club Global award at the 2006 BBC Radio 3 Awards for World Music. He was one of several DJs to remix recordings of Taraf de Haïdouks and Kočani Orkestar on the Electric Gypsyland compilations from Belgium's Crammed Discs label, and released his next album on that label. He gained popularity in Turkey after recording the clip of Disko Partizani in Istanbul. Shantel's 2007 album Disko Partizani departed somewhat from the techno sound of Bucovina Club, concentrating more on the music's Balkan roots. The album was awarded platinum in Turkey by Mü-Yap in 2008 and 2009. In 2011, he released an album with Oz Almog titled Kosher Nostra Jewish Gangsters Greatest Hits. This album is a wild mix of swing, jazz, twist, Charleston and Yiddish songs and ballads.

== Discography ==
=== Albums ===
- Club Guerilla (1995)
- Auto Jumps & Remixes (1997)
- Higher Than the Funk (1998)
- Great Delay (2001)
- Bucovina Club (2003)
- Bucovina Club Vol. 2 (2005)
- Disko Partizani (2007)
- Planet Paprika (2009)
- Anarchy + Romance (2013)
- The Mojo Club Session (2014)
- Viva Diaspora (2015)
- Mētrópolis (2023)

=== EPs and appearances ===
- Super Mandarine (1994)
- EP (1997)
- No. 2 (1997)
- "II" EP (1998)
- Oh So Lovely EP (1998)
- Oh So Lovely Remixes (1998)
- Backwood (2001)
- Inside (2001)
- Bucovina (2003)
- Disko (2003)
- Gypsy Beats and Balkan Bangers (2006)
- Disko Partizani Remixes (2008)
- Kosher Nostra Jewish Gangsters Greatest Hits (2011)
