= Borat =

2006 mockumentary directed by Larry Charles

Borat! Cultural Learnings of America for Make Benefit Glorious Nation of Kazakhstan
- Theatrical release poster
- Directed by: Larry Charles
- Screenplay by: Sacha Baron Cohen; Anthony Hines; Peter Baynham; Dan Mazer
- Story by: Sacha Baron Cohen; Peter Baynham; Anthony Hines; Todd Phillips
- Based on: Borat Sagdiyev by Sacha Baron Cohen
- Produced by: Sacha Baron Cohen; Jay Roach
- Starring: Sacha Baron Cohen
- Cinematography: Anthony Hardwick; Luke Geissbühler
- Edited by: Peter Teschner; James Thomas; Craig Alpert
- Music by: Erran Baron Cohen
- Production companies: Dune Entertainment; Four by Two Films; Everyman Pictures; Major Studio Partners; One America Productions; Ingenious Media; Talkback; Channel 4
- Distributed by: 20th Century Fox
- Release dates: 4 August 2006 (Traverse City); 2 November 2006 (United Kingdom); 3 November 2006 (United States)
- Running time: 84 minutes
- Countries: United States; United Kingdom
- Language: English (Note: Although the primary language is English, Hebrew, Armenian, Romanian, and phrases of Polish are spoken.)
- Budget: $18 million
- Box office: $262.6 million

Borat! Cultural Learnings of America for Make Benefit Glorious Nation of Kazakhstan (known commonly as Borat, and stylized as BORДT) is a 2006 mockumentary black comedy film co-written by and starring Sacha Baron Cohen as Borat Sagdiyev, a fictional Kazakh journalist traveling through the United States. Much of the film features unscripted vignettes of Borat interviewing and interacting with real-life Americans who believe he is a foreigner with little or no understanding of the local customs. Borat is the second of five films built around Baron Cohen's characters from Da Ali G Show and Ali G Indahouse.

Borat was released on 2 November 2006 by 20th Century Fox. The film received critical acclaim and made $262 million worldwide. Baron Cohen won the Golden Globe Award for Best Actor in a Motion Picture – Musical or Comedy, while the film was nominated for Best Motion Picture – Musical or Comedy. Borat also received Academy Award and WGA Award nominations for Best Adapted Screenplay. Controversy surrounded the film prior to its release, and after the film's release, some participants spoke against, and even sued, its creators. It was denounced by the Kazakh government and was banned in almost all Arab countries except for Lebanon, though it later was embraced by the Kazakh government in tourism campaigns. Borat has since been regarded as one of the greatest comedy films of the 2000s and 21st century.

A sequel, Borat Subsequent Moviefilm, followed in 2020.

== Plot ==
At the behest of the Kazakh Ministry of Information, reporter Borat Sagdiyev leaves Kazakhstan to make a documentary about American society and culture. Leaving behind his wife Oksana, and accompanied by his producer Azamat Bagatov, and a pet chicken, Borat departs for the "US and A", the "Greatest Country in the World".

In New York City, Borat watches an episode of Baywatch and becomes infatuated with Pamela Anderson's character, C. J. Parker. While interviewing and mocking a panel of feminists, he learns of the actress's name and her residence in California. Borat is then informed by telegram that a bear has killed Oksana. Delighted, he resolves to travel to California and make Anderson his new wife. Azamat insists that they drive instead of flying "in case the Jews repeated their attack of 9/11". Borat takes driving lessons and buys an old ice cream truck for the journey.

During the trip, Borat acquires a Baywatch booklet and continues to gather footage for his documentary. He meets gay pride parade participants, politicians Alan Keyes and Bob Barr, and African-American youths. Borat is also interviewed on a local television station and disrupts the weather report. Visiting a rodeo in Virginia, Borat excites the crowd with jingoistic remarks but then sings a fictional Kazakhstani national anthem to the tune of "The Star-Spangled Banner", receiving a strong negative reaction.

In Atlanta, Borat finds a hotel but is kicked out when he offends the front desk worker by talking and dressing like the African-American youths he met earlier. Staying at a bed and breakfast, Borat and Azamat are stunned to learn that their hosts are Jewish. The two escape after throwing money at two woodlice, believing they are their hosts transformed. Borat attempts to buy a handgun to defend himself, but is turned away because he is not an American citizen, so he buys a bear instead.

An etiquette coach suggests Borat attend a private dinner at an eating club in the South. During the dinner, he offends the other guests when he lets Luenell, an African-American prostitute, into the house, and as a result, they are both kicked out. Borat befriends Luenell, who invites him into a relationship with her, but he tells her he is in love with someone else. Borat then visits an antique shop, where he clumsily breaks various Confederate heritage items.

At a hotel, Borat sees Azamat masturbating over a picture of Pamela Anderson and inadvertently reveals his real motive for traveling to California. Azamat becomes livid at Borat's deception, and the situation escalates into a nude brawl that spills into the hallway, a crowded elevator, and then a packed convention ballroom.

Azamat abandons Borat, taking his passport, their money, and the bear. Borat's truck runs out of fuel, and he begins to hitchhike to California. He is soon picked up by drunken fraternity brothers from the University of South Carolina. On learning the reason for his trip, they show him the Pam and Tommy sex tape, which reveals that she is not a virgin. Despondent, Borat burns the Baywatch booklet and, by mistake, his return ticket to Kazakhstan.

Borat attends a United Pentecostal camp meeting, at which Republican U.S. Representative Chip Pickering and Mississippi Supreme Court Chief Justice James W. Smith Jr. are present. He undergoes a religious conversion to Christianity and forgives Pamela. He accompanies church members on a bus to Los Angeles, where he soon finds Azamat dressed as Oliver Hardy. They reconcile, and Azamat tells Borat where to find Pamela Anderson. Borat finally comes face-to-face with Anderson at a book signing at a Virgin Megastore. After showing Anderson his "traditional marriage sack", Borat pursues her throughout the store in an attempt to abduct her, until security guards intervene.

Borat visits Luenell, and they return to Kazakhstan together. They bring several American customs and traditions back to his village, including the apparent conversion of the people to Christianity (the Kazakh version of which includes the torture and crucifixion of Jews) and the introduction of computer-based technology, such as iPods, laptop computers, and high-definition television.

== Cast ==
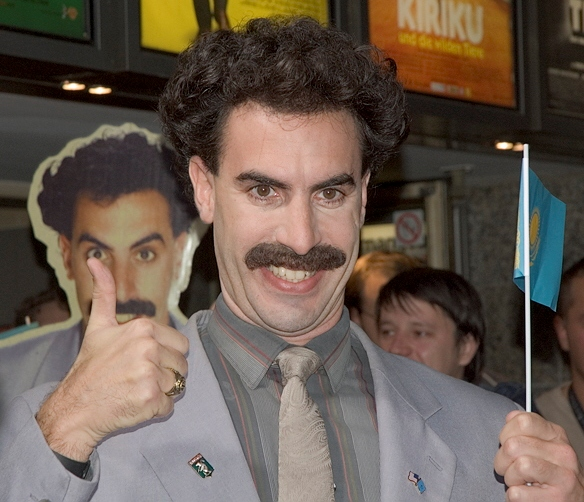
Sacha Baron Cohen in character as Borat, at the Cologne premiere of the film

- Sacha Baron Cohen as Borat Sagdiyev (Kazakh / Russian: Борат Сагдиев), a fictional Kazakh journalist, distinguished by exaggeratedly strong antisemitism, sexism, and antiziganism, which is depicted as apparently the norm in his homeland. Borat was originally created as a character for Da Ali G Show and appeared in every episode of the show, along with a cameo in the film spin-off.
- Ken Davitian as Azamat Bagatov (Kazakh / Russian: Азамат Багатов), the producer of Borat's documentary. Azamat was a new character created for the film. While he is supposedly speaking in Kazakh, he is actually speaking in Armenian throughout the movie.
- Luenell as Luenell the prostitute; first seen when Borat calls her to come to the Southern dinner. She later returns with Borat to Kazakhstan and the two wed.
- Pamela Anderson as herself; she plays a central role in the film as the reason for the journalist's cross country journey. She also appears in person at the end of the film, in a botched abduction attempt by Borat for marriage.
- When Borat seeks advice from an etiquette coach, he goes on to show nude photos of Huey Lewis Sagdiyev, his allegedly teenaged son. These photos actually show porn star Brittany CoxXx, who was chosen because producers were seeking "someone who would look 13 or 14 but was actually of legal age and would do frontal nudity".
- Politicians Alan Keyes and Bob Barr appear in the film as two of Borat's interviewees.

== Production ==
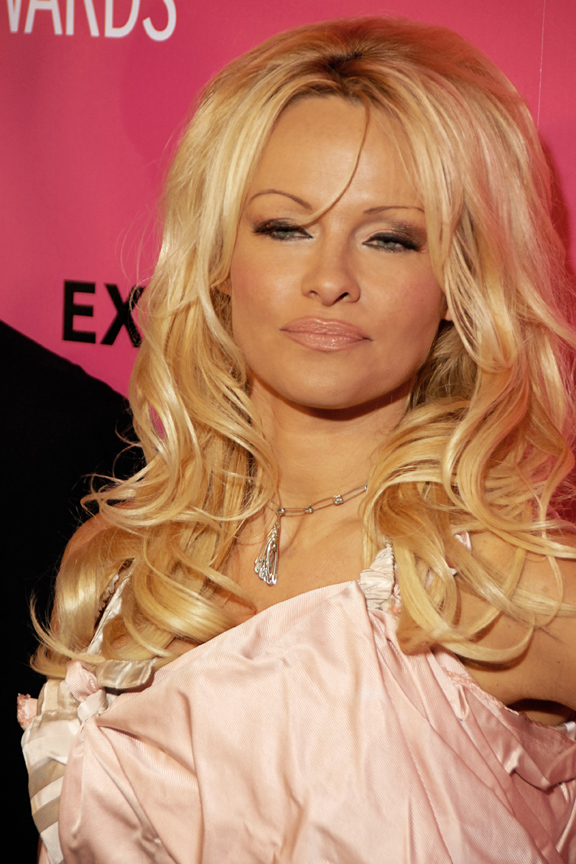
Actress and model Pamela Anderson was one of the few actors in the film and was privy to its in-jokes.

Except for Borat, Azamat, Luenell, and Pamela Anderson, none of the characters are portrayed by actors. Most scenes in the film were unscripted. In most cases, the film's participants were given no warning on what they would be taking part in except for being asked to sign release forms agreeing not to take legal action against the film's producers.

Principal photography was underway in January 2005, with Todd Phillips as the director. Baron Cohen caused a near riot in what ultimately was the rodeo scene in the final cut of the film. Phillips left the production after filming of the rodeo scene due to creative differences with Baron Cohen, and Larry Charles stepped in to direct. In Charles' version of the film, the character of Azamat was added. An interview with Baron Cohen by Rolling Stone indicated that more than 400 hours of footage had been shot for the film.

=== Location ===
The Kazakhstan depicted in the film has little or no relationship with the actual country, and the producers explicitly deny attempting to "convey the actual beliefs, practices or behaviour of anyone associated with Kazakhstan" in the "all persons fictitious" disclaimer. The scenes showing Borat's home village were filmed in the Romanian village of Glod, which is primarily Roma. The name of Borat's neighbour, Nursultan Tuyakbay, is a cross between the names of then Kazakh President Nursultan Nazarbayev and opposition politician Zharmakhan Tuyakbay.

=== Language ===
No Kazakh language dialogue is heard in the film. Borat's neighbours in Kazakhstan were portrayed by Romani people, who were unaware of the film's subject until after it premiered. Sacha Baron Cohen (Borat) commonly speaks Hebrew (due to his mother being Israeli and being fluent in the language) throughout the film, mixing with phrases of Polish. Romanian was spoken at the beginning of the film in the Romani town. The Cyrillic alphabet used in the film is the Russian form, not the Kazakh one, but most of the words written in it (especially the geographical names) are either misspelled or make no sense at all. The English words are typed on an English keyboard with a Russian language setting. The lettering on the Lockheed L-188 Electra in the beginning of the film is merely the result of Roman characters on a reversed image, and promotional materials spell "BORДT" with a Cyrillic letter for D substituted for the "A" in Faux Cyrillic style typically used to give a "Russian" appearance. While Baron Cohen speaks Hebrew in the film, Ken Davitian (Azamat) speaks Armenian.

=== Deleted scenes ===
The DVD included several deleted scenes from the film, including Borat being questioned by police at a traffic stop, visiting an animal shelter to adopt a dog that could protect him from Jews, getting a massage at a hotel, and visiting an American doctor. There is also a montage of scenes cut from the film, including Borat taking a job at Krystal and taking part in an American Civil War reenactment. The menu of deleted scenes also includes an intentionally tedious supermarket sequence with an unusually patient supermarket owner (Borat repeatedly asks about each product in the cheese section of the store and the owner responds the same way: "That's cheese"), an actual local TV news report about Borat's rodeo singing, and a final "happy ending" scene about Borat appearing in a Kazakh show titled Sexydrownwatch, a Baywatch clone that also starred Azamat, Luenell and Alexandra Paul. A scene in which Borat "started pretending he was being arrested" was filmed but removed under threat of legal action by prison officials after they learned the "documentary" was a satire. In an interview, one of the film's writers, Dan Mazer, confirmed that there was a scene filmed but cut in which Borat observed the shooting of actual pornography with actress Brooke Banner. Mazer stated that the scene was deleted so as not to compete with the naked hotel fight, but hinted it might be included in future DVD releases. In a 2016 interview on Conan, Baron Cohen elaborated on the deleted scene in which he was featured in the pornographic film.

== Release ==
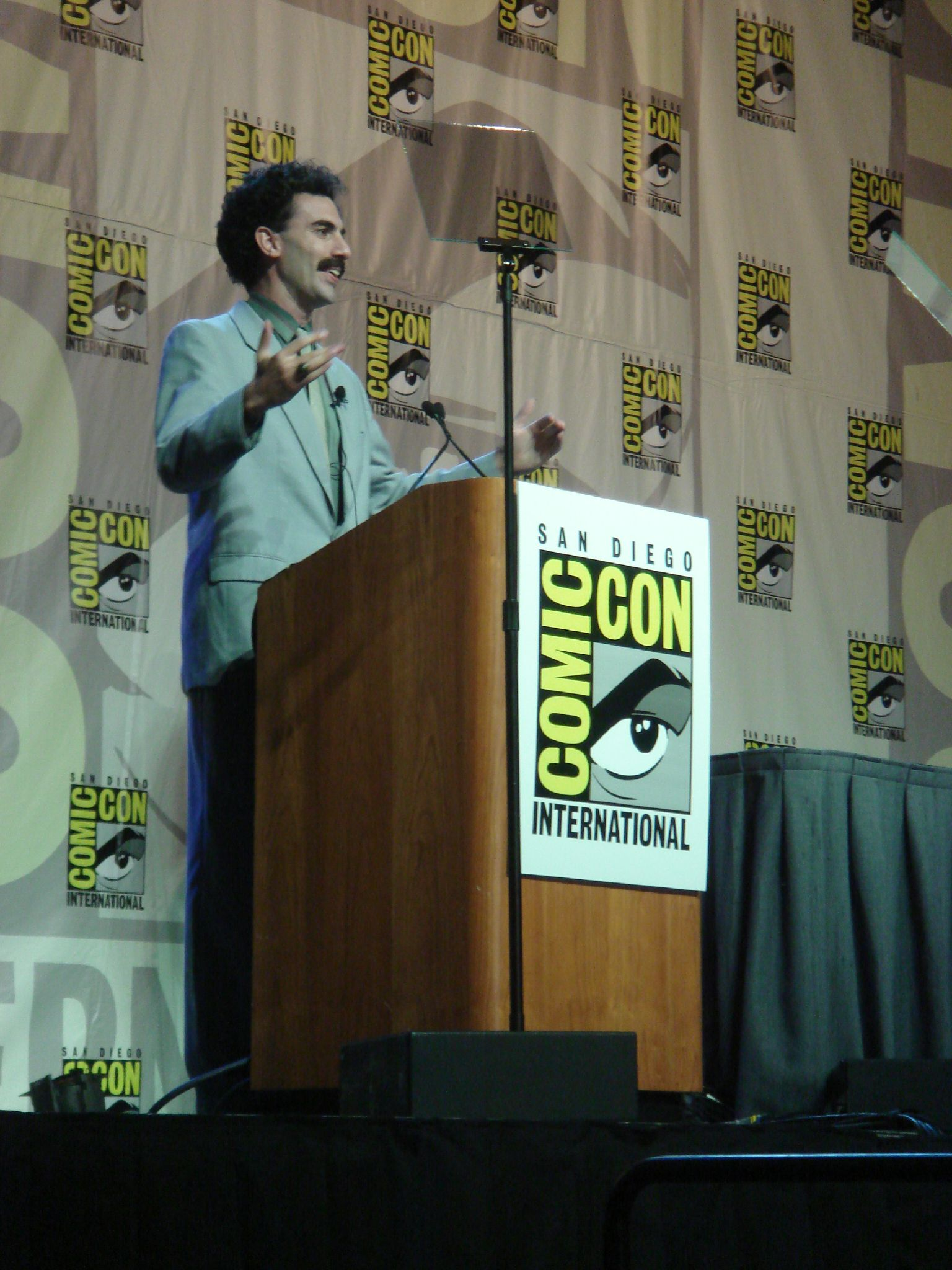
Sacha Baron Cohen as Borat at the 2006 San Diego Comic-Con, promoting the film

=== Previews ===
Borat was previewed at the 2006 Comic-Con International in San Diego, California, on 21 July 2006. Its first screening to a paying audience was during the 2006 Traverse City Film Festival, where it won the Excellence in Filmmaking Award.

The film's official debut was in Toronto on 7 September 2006, at the Ryerson Theatre during the Toronto International Film Festival. Baron Cohen arrived in character as Borat in a cart pulled by women dressed as peasants. Twenty minutes into the showing, however, the projector broke. Baron Cohen performed an impromptu act to keep the audience amused, but ultimately all attempts to fix the equipment failed. The film was successfully screened the following night, with Dustin Hoffman in attendance.

In Israel, a proposed poster depicting Borat in a sling bikini was rejected by the film's advertising firm in favour of one showing him in his usual suit. The film helped popularize the term "mankini".

=== Scaled-back U.S. release ===
The film opened at No. 1 in the box office, maintaining first place for two weeks straight. The film earned more in the second week ($28,269,900) than in the first ($26,455,463), due to an expansion onto 2,566 screens.

=== Theatrical release ===
Borat had its public release on 1 November 2006 in Belgium. By 3 November 2006, it had opened in the United States and Canada, as well as in 14 European countries. Upon its release, it was a massive hit, taking in US$26.4 million in its opening weekend, the highest ever in the United States and Canada for a film released in fewer than 1,000 cinemas until Hannah Montana & Miley Cyrus: Best of Both Worlds Concert in 2008. However, its opening day (approximately $9.2 million) was larger than that of the Hannah Montana concert (approximately $8.6 million), leaving Borat with the record of the highest opening day gross for a film released in fewer than 1,000 cinemas. On its second weekend, Borat surpassed its opening with a total of US$29 million.

== Reception ==
=== Critical response ===
Borat received widespread critical acclaim. On Rotten Tomatoes the film has a score of 90% based on reviews from 219 critics, with an average rating of 8.3/10. The website's consensus for the film reads, "Part satire, part shockumentary, Borat gets high-fives almost all-around for being offensive in the funniest possible way. Jagshemash!" On Metacritic, the film has a score of 89 out of 100 based on 38 critics, indicating "universal acclaim". Audiences surveyed by CinemaScore gave the film a grade B+ on scale of A to F.

Ty Burr spoke positively about the film in his review for The Boston Globe, calling it "silliness at its most trenchant" and declaring it the funniest film of the year. Michael Medved gave it 3.5 out of 4 stars, calling it "simultaneously hilarious and cringe-inducing, full of ingenious bits that you'll want to describe to your friends and then laugh all over again when you do". Peter Travers of Rolling Stone wrote: "You won't know what outrageous fun is until you see Borat. High-five!" In an article about the changing face of comedy, The Atlantic said that it "may be the funniest film in a decade".

The Guardian included the film in its list of ten "Best Films of the Noughties" (2000–2009). In 2019, the newspaper named Borat the 23rd greatest film of the 21st century.

Titanic and Avatar director James Cameron is reportedly a fan of the film.

One negative review came from American critic Joe Queenan, who called Baron Cohen an "odious twit". In an article for Slate, writer Christopher Hitchens offered a counter-argument to suggestions of anti-Americanism in the film. Hitchens suggested instead that the film demonstrated amazing tolerance by the film's unknowing subjects, especially citing the reactions of the guests in the Southern dinner scene to Borat's behaviour.

In 2021, members of Writers Guild of America West (WGAW) and Writers Guild of America East (WGAE) voted the film's screenplay 93rd in WGA's 101 Greatest Screenplays of the 21st Century (so far). In 2025, the film ranked number 53 on The New York Times' list of "The 100 Best Movies of the 21st Century" and was one of the films voted for the "Readers' Choice" edition of the list, finishing at number 200.

=== Box office ===
American audiences embraced the film, which played to sold-out crowds at many showings on its opening, despite having been shown on only 837 screens. Borat debuted at No. 1 on its opening weekend, with a total gross of $26.4 million, beating its competitors Flushed Away and The Santa Clause 3: The Escape Clause. The cinema average for the film's opening weekend was an estimated $31,511, topping Star Wars: Episode III – Revenge of the Sith, yet behind Pirates of the Caribbean: Dead Man's Chest and Spider-Man. It retained the top spot in its second weekend after expanding to 2,566 theatres, extending the box office total to $67.8 million.

In the United Kingdom, Borat opened at No. 1, with an opening weekend gross of £6,242,344 ($11,935,986), the 43rd best opening week earnings in the UK as of March 2007. Since its release, Borat has grossed over $260 million worldwide.

=== Accolades ===
| Award | Category | Recipient | Result |
|---|---|---|---|
| Academy Awards | Best Adapted Screenplay | Sacha Baron Cohen, Anthony Hines, Peter Baynham, Dan Mazer and Todd Phillips | Nominated |
| Golden Globe Awards | Best Motion Picture – Musical or Comedy | | Nominated |
| Golden Globe Awards | Best Actor – Musical or Comedy | Sacha Baron Cohen | Won |
| Writers Guild of America Award | Best Adapted Screenplay | Sacha Baron Cohen, Anthony Hines, Peter Baynham, Dan Mazer and Todd Phillips | Nominated |
| Critics Choice Association | Best Comedy | | Won |
| San Francisco Bay Area Film Critics Circle | Best Actor | Sacha Baron Cohen | Won |
| Toronto Film Critics Association | Best Actor | Sacha Baron Cohen | Won |
| Online Film Critics Society | Best Actor | Sacha Baron Cohen | Nominated |
| Online Film Critics Society | Best Breakthrough Performance | Sacha Baron Cohen | Won |
| Los Angeles Film Critics Association | Best Actor | Sacha Baron Cohen | Won (Note: Tied with Forest Whitaker in The Last King of Scotland) |
| London Film Critics' Circle | British Actor of the Year | Sacha Baron Cohen | Nominated |

== Controversies ==
=== Participants' responses ===
After the film's release, Dharma Arthur, a news producer for ABC affiliate WAPT in Jackson, Mississippi, wrote a letter to Newsweek saying that Borat's appearance on the station had led to her losing her job: "Because of him, my boss lost faith in my abilities and second-guessed everything I did thereafter. How upsetting that a man who leaves so much harm in his path is applauded as a comedic genius." Although Arthur has said she was fired from the newscast, she told the Associated Press that she resigned from the station. She said that she checked a public relations website that Borat's producers gave her before booking him.

In news coverage that aired in January 2005 of the filming of the rodeo scene, Bobby Rowe, producer of the Salem, Virginia rodeo depicted in the film, stated that he felt he had been the victim of a hoax. He said that "months" prior to the appearance, he had been approached by someone from "One America, a California-based film company that was reportedly doing a documentary on a Russian immigrant"; he agreed to permit the "immigrant" to sing the U.S. national anthem after listening to a tape. After the film's release, Rowe said, "Some people come up and say, 'Hey, you made the big time'; I've made the big time, but not in the way I want it."

Cindy Streit, Borat's etiquette consultant, subsequently hired high-profile attorney Gloria Allred, who demanded that the California Attorney General investigate fraud allegedly committed by Baron Cohen and the film's producers.

The Salon Arts & Entertainment site quotes the Behars (a Jewish couple at whose guest house Borat and Azamat stay) as calling the film "outstanding", referring to Baron Cohen as "very lovely and very polite" and a "genius". The Boston Globe also interviewed the couple, saying they considered the film more anti-Muslim than antisemitic and had feared that Baron Cohen and his ensemble might be filming pornography in the house.

The feminists from Veteran Feminists of America (VFA) felt that they had been duped, having "sensed something odd was going on" before and during the interview with Borat. The Guardian later reported at least one of the women felt that the film was worth going to see at the cinema.

The New York Post had reported in November 2006 that Pamela Anderson filed for divorce from her husband Kid Rock after he reacted unfavourably to the film during a screening. The Post's article specifically claimed he had said of her role in the film, "You're nothing but a whore! You're a slut! How could you do that movie?" In an interview on The Howard Stern Show, Anderson confirmed that Rock was upset by her appearance in the film, but did not confirm that this was the cause of the separation.

=== Legal action by participants ===
The villagers of Glod, Romania, took legal action against the producers of Borat, complaining that they were lied to about the nature of the filming and they were portrayed as incestuous and ignorant. Some said they were paid only three lei (about $1.28 in 2004) each, while others stated they were paid between $70 and $100 each, which did not cover their expenses. The residents asked for $38 million in damages. One lawsuit was thrown out by U.S. District Judge Loretta Preska in a hearing in early December 2006 on the ground that the allegations in the complaint were too vague. Despite this, the litigants planned to refile. In April 2008, the case was dismissed again, citing insufficient evidence. In his defence, 20th Century Fox revealed Baron Cohen had donated $5,000 to the town, as well as paying a location fee, and bought computers, school and business supplies for the residents.

Two of the University of South Carolina fraternity brothers who appeared in the film, Justin Seay and Christopher Rotunda, sued the producers, claiming defamation. The suit by Seay and Rotunda was dismissed in February 2007. The students had also sought an injunction to prevent the DVD release of the film, which was denied.

Another lawsuit was filed by a South Carolina resident who said he was accosted by Baron Cohen (as Borat) in the bathroom at a restaurant in downtown Columbia, with the actor allegedly making comments regarding the individual's genitals, without signing any legal waiver. The lawsuit also sought to have the footage excluded from any DVD releases and removed from Internet video sites.

The North Macedonian Romani singer Esma Redžepova sued the film's producers, seeking €800,000 because the film used her song "Chaje Šukarije" without her permission. Since Redžepova's production house had failed to inform her that they had granted permission to use the song, she instead received a €26,000 compensation from it.

Felix Cedeno, a 31-year-old American, sued 20th Century Fox for $2.25 million, after he was filmed as part of a scene where a live chicken fell out of Borat's suitcase on the subway. Cedeno later dropped the suit and received nothing.

Baltimore resident Michael Psenicska sought more than $100,000 in damages from Baron Cohen, 20th Century Fox, and other parties. Psenicska—a high school mathematics teacher who also owns a driving school—was reportedly paid $500 in cash to give Borat a driving lesson. In his action—filed in the U.S. District Court in Manhattan—the driving instructor said that he had been told the film was a "documentary about the integration of foreign people into the American way of life", and that if he had known the film's true nature, he would have never participated. Psenicska said he was entitled to damages because the defendants used images of him to advertise the film. The case was dismissed on 9 September 2008.

Jeffrey Lemerond, who was shown running and yelling, "Get away" as Borat attempted to hug strangers on a New York street, filed a legal case claiming his image was used in the film illegally, and that he suffered "public ridicule, degradation and humiliation" as a result. The case was dismissed.

Baron Cohen reacted to these suits by commenting: "Some of the letters I get are quite unusual, like the one where the lawyer informed me I'm about to be sued for $100,000 and at the end says, 'P.S. Loved the movie. Can you sign a poster for my son Jeremy?'"

=== Reception in Kazakhstan ===
The government of Kazakhstan at first denounced Borat. In 2005, following Borat's appearance at the MTV Movie Awards, the country's Foreign Ministry threatened to sue Sacha Baron Cohen, and Borat's Kazakh-based website, www.borat.kz, was taken down. Kazakhstan also launched a multi-million dollar "Heart of Eurasia" campaign to counter the Borat effect; Baron Cohen replied by denouncing the campaign at an in-character press conference in front of the White House as the propaganda of the "evil nitwits" of Uzbekistan. Uzbekistan is, throughout the film, referred to by Borat as his nation's second leading problem, with the first being the Jews. In November 2006, Kazakh TV personality Jantemir Baimukhamedov travelled to London with the stated aim of presenting Baron Cohen with horse meat and horse urine, which were claimed by Borat to be the national food and drink of Kazakhstan, although he was unable to organise a meeting with him.

In 2006, Gemini Films, the Central Asian distributor of 20th Century Fox, complied with a Kazakh government request to not release the film. That year, Kazakh ambassador to the United Kingdom Erlan Idrissov, after viewing the film, called parts of the film funny and wrote that the film had "placed Kazakhstan on the map". By 2012, Kazakh Foreign Minister Yerzhan Kazykhanov attributed a great rise in tourism to his country—with visas issued rising ten times—to the film, saying, "I am grateful to Borat for helping attract tourists to Kazakhstan."

According to Yerlan Askarbekov, a Kazakh public relations professional who worked with both the British Council and the Kazakh government who wrote a piece for the BBC website in 2016, ten years after the film's release, many of his colleagues in the Kazakh media saw the character of Borat as a valuable PR opportunity. According to him some of the Kazakhs who were most upset by the film were students studying in the US and the UK, who understood the film's satirical intent but felt that their non-Kazakh peers were taking the film at face value as an accurate portrayal of the country. He suggested that interest in the character inside the country faded once Kazakhs grasped that the film was designed to "get an outsider's view of the US and reveal the prejudices of the Americans who Borat interacts with... functioning as a sort of 21st Century Alexis de Tocqueville".

The Kazakh tabloid Karavan declared Borat to be the best film of the year, having had a reviewer see the film at a screening in Vienna. The paper said that it was "certainly not an anti-Kazakh, anti-Romanian or anti-Semitic" film, but rather "cruelly anti-American ... amazingly funny and sad at the same time". Another favorable word came from Kazakh novelist Sapabek Asip-uly, who suggested Baron Cohen be nominated for the annual award bestowed by the Kazakh Club of Art Patrons. In a letter published by the newspaper Vremya, Asip-uly wrote, "[Borat] has managed to spark an immense interest of the whole world in Kazakhstan—something our authorities could not do during the years of independence. If state officials completely lack a sense of humor, their country becomes a laughing stock." Amazon UK has also reported significant numbers of orders of Borat on DVD from Kazakhstan.

In 2020, Kazakhstan changed their travel slogan to "Very Nice" as a result of the interest in the country.

=== Accidental use of its parody national anthem ===
In 2012, the parody national anthem from the film's soundtrack, which acclaims Kazakhstan for its high-quality potassium exports and having the second-cleanest prostitutes in the region, was mistakenly played at the medal ceremony of Mariya Dmitriyenko at the Emir of Kuwait International Shooting Grand Prix. The incident apparently resulted from the wrong song being downloaded from the Internet.

=== Accusations of ethnic defamation ===
The European Center for Antiziganism Research, which works against negative attitudes toward Romani people, filed a complaint with German prosecutors on 18 October 2006, based on Borat's references to "gypsies" in his film. The complaint accuses him of defamation and inciting violence against an ethnic group. As a consequence, 20th Century Fox declared that it would remove all parts referring to gypsies from trailers shown on German television as well as on the film's website.

Before the release of the film, the Anti-Defamation League (ADL) released a statement expressing concern over Borat's characteristic antisemitism. Both Baron Cohen (who is Jewish) and the ADL have stated that the film uses Borat to expose prejudices felt or tolerated by others, but the ADL expressed concern that some audiences might remain oblivious of this aspect of the film's humor, while "some may even find it reinforcing their bigotry".

=== Censorship in the Arab world ===
The film was banned in the entire Arab world except for Lebanon and the United Arab Emirates (which released the film heavily censored). Yousuf Abdul Hamid, a film censor for Dubai in the United Arab Emirates, called the film "vile, gross and extremely ridiculous". The censor said that he and his colleagues had walked out on their screening before it had finished, and that only half an hour of the film would be left once all the offensive scenes were removed.

== Soundtrack ==
The soundtrack for Borat was released on the iTunes Store on 24 October 2006, and in shops on 31 October 2006. The album included music from the film, five tracks entitled "Dialoguing excerpt from moviefilm", as well as the controversial anti-Semitic song "In My Country There Is Problem" from Da Ali G Show.

The folk music included in the soundtrack has no connection to the authentic music of Kazakhstan. The album features songs by Romani and Balkan artists (mostly Emir Kusturica and Goran Bregović) and includes music by Erran Baron Cohen, founding member of ZOHAR Sound System and brother of Borat star Sacha Baron Cohen, as well as songs sung by Sacha Baron Cohen himself in character as Borat.

== Home media ==
The Region 2 DVD was released 5 March 2007, with the Region 1 release the following day. Special features include deleted scenes, faux advertisements for the soundtrack album, and a complete Russian language translation audio track using a professional dubbing cast, along with the English, French, and Spanish language tracks common on Region 1. There is also a choice of Hebrew, but this is merely a joke; choosing the Hebrew language option results in a warning screen reading "You have been trapped, Jew!" which warns the viewer not to change his shape and to keep his claws where they can be seen, again playing on the anti-Semitism supposedly prevalent in Borat's version of Kazakhstan. It also includes footage of Borat's publicity tour for the film, with Baron Cohen in character as Borat on The Tonight Show with Jay Leno, Late Night with Conan O'Brien, the Toronto International Film Festival, and Saturday Night Live. The bonus features conclude with a news segment from a Virginia TV station about Borat's night at the rodeo, complete with an interview with rodeo owner Bobby Rowe.

As a play on the copyright infringement common in the former Soviet Union, the packaging of the Region 1 (United States/Canada), 2 (Europe/Japan/South Africa/Middle East), and 4 (Latin America/Oceania) editions mimics a foreign bootleg DVD. The slipcover is in English but the case itself has all-Cyrillic text (a majority of which is in legitimate Russian, not faux Cyrillic) and is made to look poorly photocopied. The disc itself is made to look like a "Demorez" DVD-R with the slogan "Is life? No. Demorez.", a parody on "Is it live, or is it Memorex?" ad campaign, and the word "BOЯAT" appearing to be crudely written in marker with the "R" written backwards. The UMD version is similar to the DVD, even being labelled a "UMD-R" (which do not exist). Even the Fox in-cover advertising is written in broken English that appears poorly printed, indicating that there are "More movie discs available from US&A" and "Also legal to own in Kazakhstan".

There are further jokes within the DVD itself. The menus are styled as a worn, static-laden film on an erratically functioning projector, with more Cyrillic writing accompanied by translations in broken English. The DVD is described as a "prerecorded moviedisc for purpose domestic viewing of moviefilm", and the viewer is warned that "selling piratings of this moviedisc will result in punishment by crushing". The DVD's collection of trailers promises that the depicted films are "coming Kazakhstan in 2028". By April 2007, the DVD had sold over 3.5 million copies, totaling more than $55 million in sales. Borat was released on Blu-ray outside the United States and Canada on 9 November 2009 as a region-free disc.

== Sequel ==
In 2009, the film Brüno was released. Co-written, co-produced by, and starring Baron Cohen, the film was based on another of his characters: Brüno, a gay Austrian fashion reporter. Universal Studios is reported to have produced the film with a budget of $42 million.

Rupert Murdoch announced in early February 2007 that Baron Cohen had signed on to do another Borat film with Fox. However, this was contradicted by an interview in which Baron Cohen himself stated that Borat was to be discontinued, as he was now too recognizable to prevent detection as he did in the original film and on Da Ali G Show. A spokesman for Fox later said that it was too early to begin planning such a film, although they were open to the idea.

Baron Cohen subsequently announced that he was "killing off" the characters of Borat and Ali G because they were now so famous he could no longer trick people. Even though he decided to retire the characters, on 26 February 2014, he brought them back for the FXX series Ali G: Rezurection, a collection of the sketches from all 18 episodes of Da Ali G Show, including new footage of Baron Cohen in-character as Ali G, who is portrayed as the presenter of the show.

Baron Cohen revived the character of Borat in December 2015 on the late night talk show Jimmy Kimmel Live! to premiere the new trailer for his movie Grimsby.

In September 2020, a direct sequel, titled Borat Subsequent Moviefilm, was officially confirmed to have been secretly filmed, completed and screened during the COVID-19 pandemic a few weeks after Baron Cohen was spotted driving a pick-up truck in character as Borat around Los Angeles. That same month, Amazon Studios acquired distribution rights to the film and released it on 23 October 2020.

== See also ==
- Absurdistan
- Molvanîa
- Elbonia
- Lower Slobbovia
- Anti-Americanism
