= Borat Sagdiyev =

Fictional character created and portrayed by Sacha Baron Cohen

Borat Sagdiyev Борат Сагдиев
- Da Ali G Show and Borat character
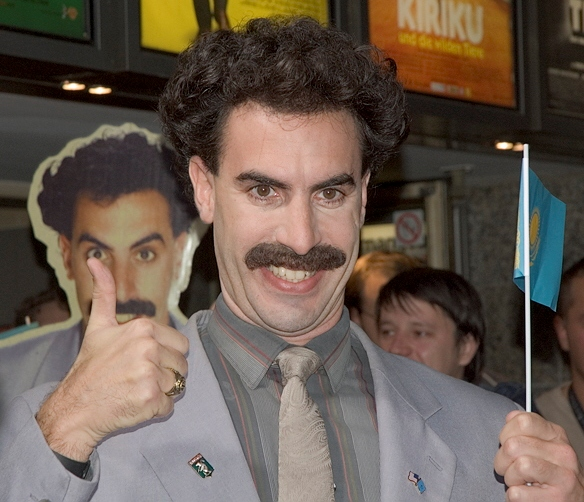
- Baron Cohen as Borat at the German premiere of Borat (2006)
- First appearance: F2F (1996) (as Alexi Krickler); Da Ali G Show (2000) (as Borat)
- Last appearance: "Ali G: Who iz I? | Official Trailer 2" (2026)
- Created by: Sacha Baron Cohen
- Portrayed by: Sacha Baron Cohen

In-universe information
- Full name: Borat Margaret Boltokovich Sagdiyev
- Aliases: Prof. Philip Drummond III; John Chevrolet; Cliff Safari; Country Steve; Patient Zero
- Title: Global Ambassador for Glorious Nation of Kazakhstan
- Occupation: Journalist; broadcaster; singer; actor; ping pong player; global ambassador for Kazakhstan
- Family: Boltok "The Rapist" Sagdiyev (father); Asimbala Sagdiyeva (mother); Natalya Sagdiyeva (sister); Bilo Sagdiyev (twin brother); Maryam Tulyakbay (mother-in-law); Nursultan Tulyakbay (half-brother); Oksana Sagdiyeva (half-sister/wife))
- Spouses: Ludmilla Sagdiyeva; Oksana Sagdiyeva (died during filming of Borat's "documentary"); Luenell; At least 2 more
- Children: Bilak and Biram Sagdiyev (twin sons); Huey-Lewis "Jeffrey Epstein" Sagdiyev (son); Tutar Sagdiyeva (daughter)
- Religion: Tengrism; Pentecostalism (briefly)
- Origin: Kuzcek, Kazakh SSR, Soviet Union (present-day Kazakhstan)
- Nationality: Soviet (formerly); Kazakhstani (currently)

Borat Margaret Boltokovich Sagdiyev (/ˈbɔːræt ˈsæɡdiɛf/; Kazakh: Борат Маргарет Болтокұлы Сағдиев, romanized: Borat Margaret Boltokūly Sağdiev; Russian: Борат Маргарет Болтокович Сагдиев) is a satirical fictional character created and performed by Sacha Baron Cohen. Depicted as a television journalist from Kazakhstan, the character serves as the main protagonist of the 2006 mockumentary Borat! Cultural Learnings of America for Make Benefit Glorious Nation of Kazakhstan and its 2020 sequel Borat Subsequent Moviefilm: Delivery of Prodigious Bribe to American Regime for Make Benefit Once Glorious Nation of Kazakhstan, and a main character of Da Ali G Show.

Borat's humour arises from his espousal of outrageous sociocultural viewpoints, his violation of social taboos, and his use of vulgar language and behaviour in inappropriate settings. Most often the comedy relies on Borat's obliviousness to First World natives not sharing his regressive worldview, but occasionally Borat's innocent and collegial demeanor will provoke his targets to reveal biases they would otherwise be reluctant to share publicly. Entertainment Weekly put the 2006 film on its end-of-the-decade "best-of" list.

== Origins ==
The character was first developed for the purpose of short skits on F2F on Granada Talk TV that Baron Cohen presented in 1996–1997; at this time, the character was known as Alexi Krickler. The character, now known as Kristo Shqiptari, was picked by BBC Two's Comedy Nation. Alexi and Kristo were nearly identical in looks and demeanor to the later incarnation, although Alexi claimed to be Moldovan and Kristo claimed to be Albanian rather than Kazakhstani.

== Fictional character biography ==
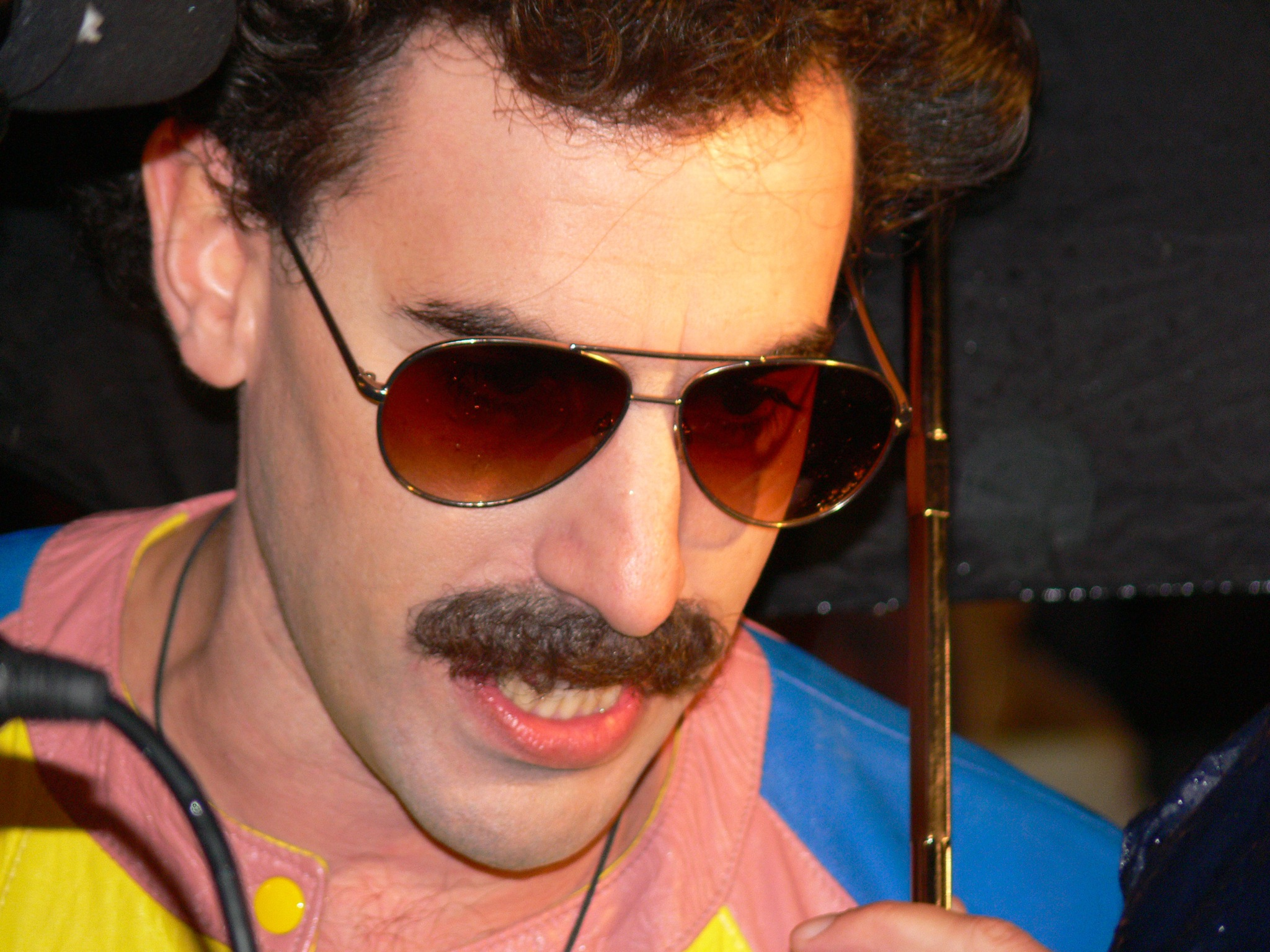
Borat at the premiere of his film in London, 2006

Borat was born and raised in the village of Kuzcek, Kazakh SSR to Maryam Tulyakbay and Boltok the Rapist.

According to various in-character interviews with Sacha Baron Cohen, Borat attended Astana University, where he studied English, journalism and plague research. He created five new plagues which "killed over five million goats" in Uzbekistan, a country that he has a strong hatred of.

Borat mostly speaks English during his reports. His supposed Kazakh language in some scenes is in fact a mix of Hebrew and Polish (Baron Cohen is fluent in Hebrew and has lived in Israel). Borat usually introduces himself with the term "Jagshemash" ("Jak się masz?", meaning "How are you?" in Polish) and ends reports with "Chenquieh" ("Dziękuję", meaning "Thank you" in Polish). He often uses the phrase "Wa wa wee wa!", an expression of surprised delight which came from a skit by Dov Glickman on the popular Israeli comedy show Zehu Ze!.

Although nominally pagan most of his life, sometimes remarking that he "follow[s] the hawk", during his trip to the US, he attends a Pentecostal church service and later converts his entire village to Christianity, his version of which involves crucifying Jews. Borat is a keen admirer of Joseph Stalin and claims that both he and Stalin are strong men with powerful "khram" (genitals). He strongly opposes women's rights and is quite aghast upon learning that in Britain and the US, women can vote while horses cannot. He frequently comments that allowing women to vote is like "allowing a monkey to drive a car". In his spare time, he enjoys playing table tennis (ping pong), sun-bathing while clad in a lime-green mankini, disco dancing, spitting, sitting on comfortable chairs, shooting dogs (and Jews) and taking pictures of women when they "make a toilet". He is also fond of "sexy time", particularly "mouth-party" and "hand-party". Borat also states that he "very much like Korki Butchek" (a fictional Kazakh musician).

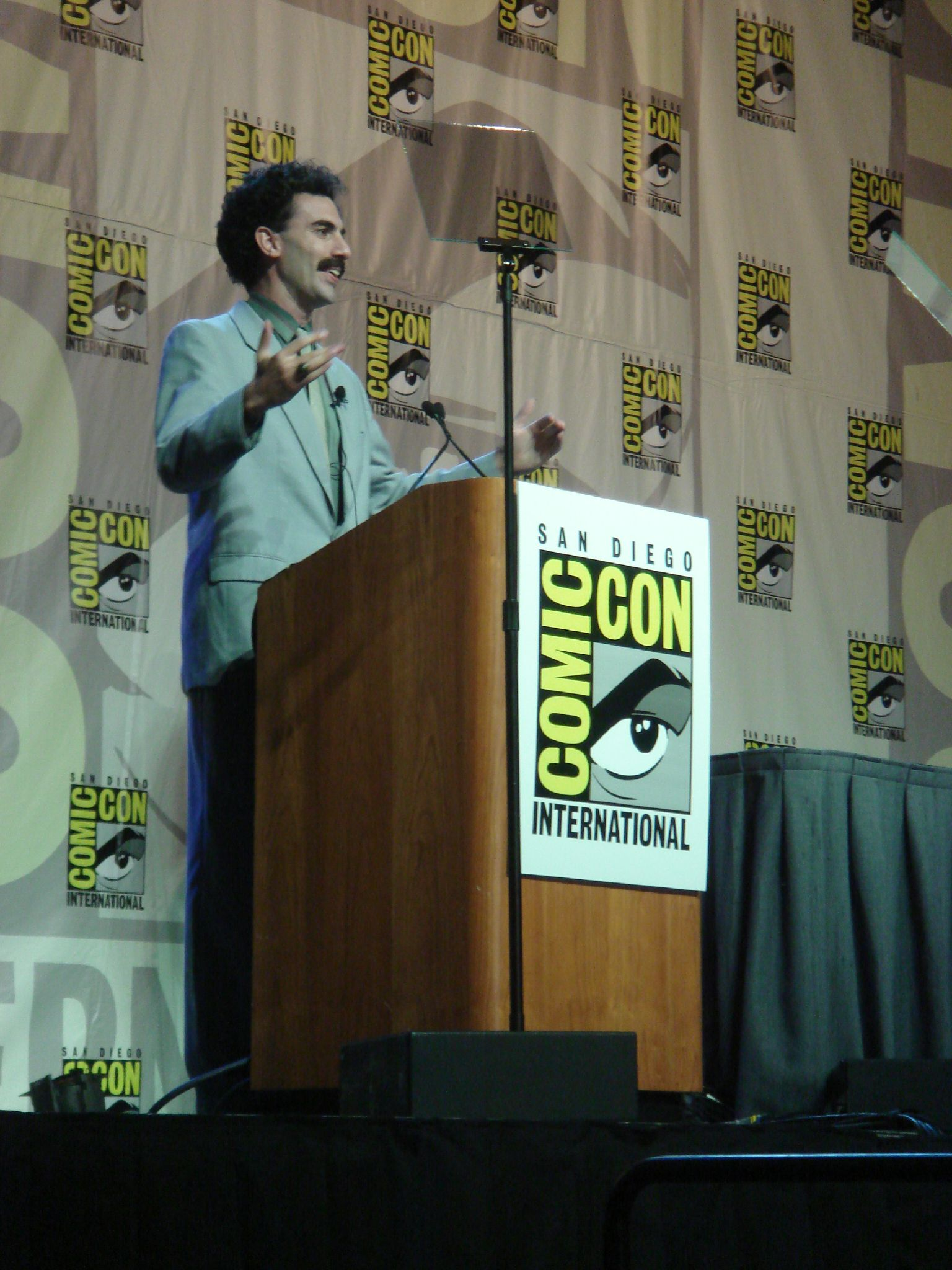
Borat at San Diego Comic-Con in 2006.

In 2007, Sacha Baron Cohen stated that the character of Borat, alongside his Ali G character, would be retired.

Borat's last appearances were at Night of Too Many Stars: An Overbooked Event for Autism Education 2006 television special and an online public service announcement ahead of the 2008 United States elections. However, in 2016, to promote the trailer release of his film Grimsby, Baron Cohen appeared in character as Borat on Jimmy Kimmel Live! He then made an appearance on the show on 7 November 2018 as a part of a guest appearance by Baron Cohen to promote his show Who Is America? In 2020, Baron Cohen officially rekindled Borat with the filming of Borat Subsequent Moviefilm, which was released on 23 October 2020, introducing the character of Borat's daughter Tutar Sagdiyev, portrayed by Maria Bakalova.

== Criticism and controversy ==
=== Criticized as unfair smear against Kazakhstan ===
On 19 October 2006, the BBC reported that Kazakhstan's Deputy Foreign Minister, Rakhat Aliyev, had invited Baron Cohen to visit Kazakhstan to see how inaccurate his portrayals were. In an interview, Aliyev asserted that "His trip could yield a lot of discoveries—that women not only travel inside buses but also drive their own cars, that we make wine from grapes, that Jews can freely attend synagogues and so on."

=== Denigration of Roma ===
Borat's movie has been accused of promoting antiziganism. The film has been criticised for several scenes portraying Borat's fictional "Kazakh" village which were actually filmed in the impoverished Roma village of Glod in Romania. USA Today reports that poverty-stricken villagers were offered between $3.30 and $5.50 to bring animals into their houses and other gag scenes for the movie that some people described as humiliating.

Two villagers of Glod hired controversial reparation attorney Ed Fagan to sue the makers of the film for $30 million for human rights abuses. Fagan intended to submit lawsuits in New York and Florida state courts, as well as in Frankfurt, Germany. Fagan said that he hoped to "teach Hollywood a very expensive lesson." The lawsuit was thrown out by U.S. District Judge Loretta Preska in a hearing in early December 2006 on the ground that the charges were too vague to stand up in court. Fagan planned to refile, but has since been disbarred.

=== Denigration of Jews ===
The Borat character has been accused of antisemitism. However, Baron Cohen, himself a Jew, has explained that the segments are a "dramatic demonstration of how racism feeds on dumb conformity, as much as rabid bigotry." "Borat essentially works as a tool. By himself pretending to be anti-Semitic, he lets people lower their guard and expose their own prejudice," Baron Cohen explained to Rolling Stone. Baron Cohen, the grandson of a Holocaust survivor, says he wishes in particular to expose the role of indifference:

When I was in university, there was this major historian of the Third Reich, Ian Kershaw, who said, "The path to Auschwitz was paved with indifference." I know it's not very funny being a comedian talking about the Holocaust, but it's an interesting idea that not everyone in Germany had to be a raving anti-Semite. They just had to be apathetic.

(The exact line from Kershaw's 1983 book Popular Opinion and Political Dissent in the Third Reich was that "the road to Auschwitz was built by hate, but paved with indifference".)

However, the Anti-Defamation League, a United States–based group that "combat[s] anti-Semitism and bigotry of all kinds", complained to HBO after Borat performed his country and western song "In My Country There Is Problem". It called on people to "throw the Jew down the well", warning that "you must be careful of his teeth" and that "you must grab him by his money", and was welcomed with applause and participation by some members of an audience in Tucson, Arizona. The full chorus goes: "Throw the Jew down the well / So my country can be free / You must grab him by his horns / Then we have a big party."

In another scene, Borat visits the Serengeti Range ranch in Texas, where the owner of the ranch, Gene Gordon, confides that he believes the Holocaust was a necessity for Germany. He further implies that he would have no moral qualms about running a ranch where people can hunt, in Borat's words, "deer ... then Jew."

The film has enjoyed particular success in Israel because Israeli filmgoers understand what Borat is really saying when he is supposedly spouting Kazakh: throughout the film, Borat speaks fluent Hebrew with some phrases in Polish, and his assistant speaks Armenian.

The crowd was not pleased. One witness stated that "if he [Baron Cohen] had been out there a minute longer, I think somebody would have shot him [...] people were booing him, flipping him off." For his own safety, Baron Cohen was escorted from the venue (much of the event appears in the movie).
