= Bang (film) =

- Bang DVD cover
- Directed by: Ash
- Written by: Ash
- Produced by: Daniel M. Berger
- Starring: Darling Narita; Peter Greene
- Cinematography: David Gasperik
- Edited by: Ash
- Music by: Orlando Aguillen
- Distributed by: Panorama Entertainment
- Release dates: September 9, 1995 (TIFF); July 11, 1997 (United Kingdom); November 1997 (United States)
- Running time: 99 minutes
- Country: United States
- Language: English

Bang is a 1995 American crime drama film directed by Ash Baron-Cohen (aka Ash) who is the cousin of well-known TV and film performer, Sacha Baron Cohen.

== Plot ==
A young woman in L.A. is having a bad day: she's evicted, an audition ends with a producer furious she won't trade sex for the part, and a policeman nabs her for something she didn't do, demanding fellatio to release her. She snaps, grabs his gun, takes his uniform, and leaves him cuffed to a tree where he's soon having a defenseless chat with a homeless man. She takes off on the cop's motorcycle and, for an afternoon, experiences a cop's life. She talks a young man out of suicide and then is plunged into violence after a friendly encounter with two "vatos." She is torn between self-protection and others' expectations. Is there any resolution for her torrent of feelings?

== Cast ==
- Darling Narita as The Girl
- Peter Greene as Adam
- Michael Newland as Officer Trotter
- James Sharpe as Officer Ham
- Luis Guizar as Jesus
- Art Cruz as Juan
- Notorious D. as O.G. On Rooftop (credited as Donald 'Notorious' D)
- James Noble as Rooftop Dealer
- Eric Kirkpatrick as Tucker
- Wandi Herman as Piwi On Rooftop
- David Conner as Ivan
- Stephanie Martini as Joey
- Lucy Liu as Hooker (credited as Lucy Lui)
- Paul Saucido as Drive-By Cholo
- Roberta Rodman as Audition Model
- Juanita Salinas as Latina Woman
- Glori Gold as Do-Me Girl

The film features an early film appearance by Lucy Liu.

== Reception ==
On A.V. Club, Nathan Rabin wrote that "it's not a very good film, but Bangs integrity and level of ambition make it a strangely watchable little sleeper."

Roger Ebert rated it 3 and a half stars out of 4, writing that 'Knowing little about Bang before a saw it, except for its reputation as a low-budget film shot guerrilla-style on the streets, I confess I expected flashy sub-Tarantino Gen X narcissism. What I didn’t expect was a film so well made, so penetrating, so observant."
