= List of awards and nominations received by Sacha Baron Cohen =

Sacha Baron Cohen awards and nominations
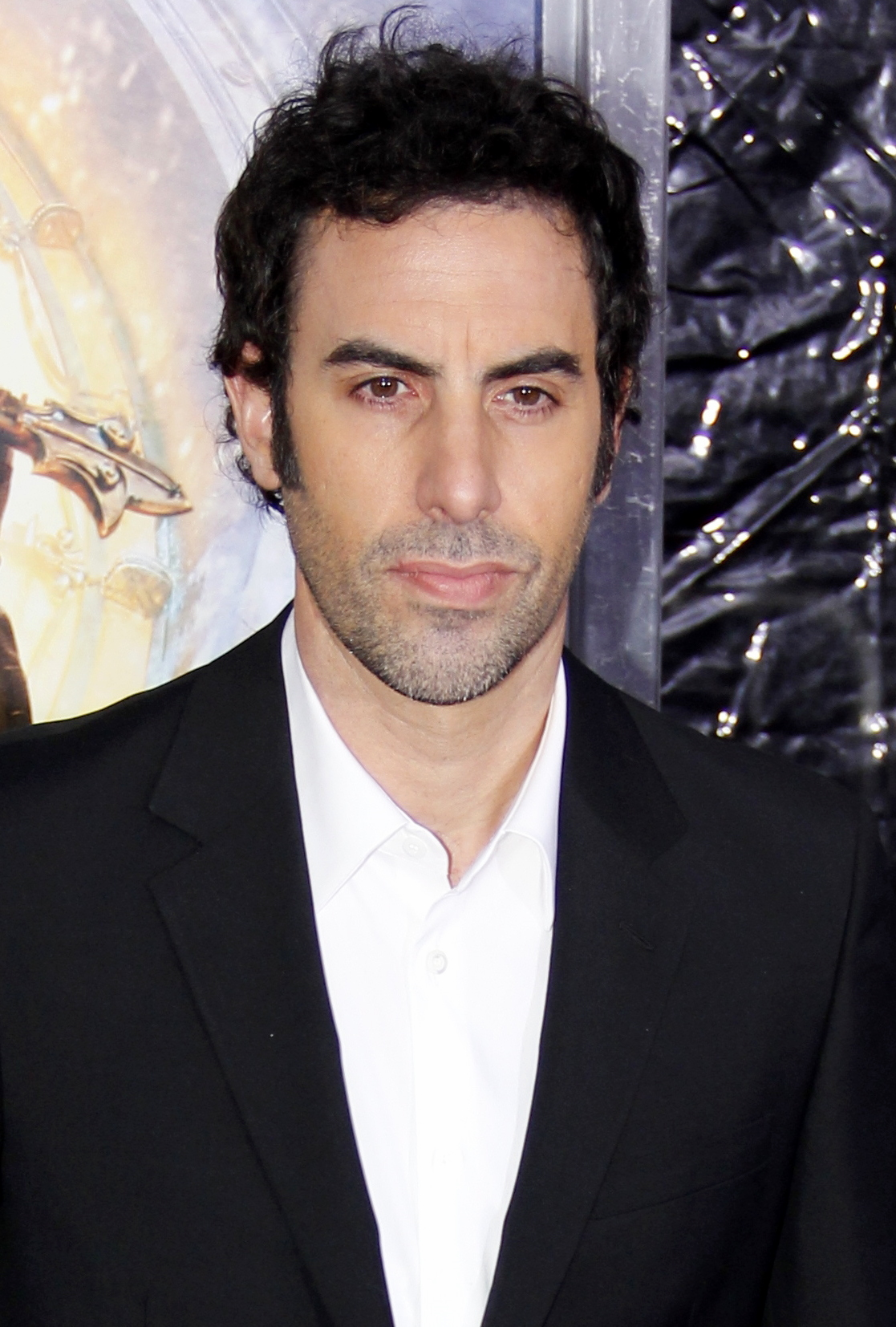
- Cohen in 2011
Awards and nominations
Award	Wins	Nominations
Academy Awards	0	3
BAFTA Awards	2	3
Emmy Awards	0	6
Golden Globes	2	5
SAG Awards	1	3

Totals (Note: Certain award groups do not simply award one winner. They acknowledge several different recipients, have runners-up, and have third place. Since this is a specific recognition and is different from losing an award, runner-up mentions are considered wins in this award tally. For simplification and to avoid errors, each award in this list has been presumed to have had a prior nomination.)
- Wins: 10
- Nominations: 96

This article is a List of awards and nominations received by Sacha Baron Cohen

Sacha Baron Cohen is an English actor and comedian. He has received several awards including two BAFTA Awards, two Golden Globe Awards and a Screen Actors Guild Award as well as nominations for three Academy Awards, and six Primetime Emmy Awards.

For his playing the title role in the mockumentary Borat (2006) he won the Golden Globe Award for Best Actor in a Motion Picture – Musical or Comedy and was nominated for the Academy Award for Best Adapted Screenplay. He portrayed Abbie Hoffman in the Aaron Sorkin directed political legal drama The Trial of the Chicago 7 (2021) for which he was nominated for the Academy Award for Best Supporting Actor, the Golden Globe Award for Best Supporting Actor – Motion Picture and the Screen Actors Guild Award for Outstanding Performance by a Male Actor in a Supporting Role. He reprised his role as Borat in the sequel, Borat Subsequent Moviefilm (2020) for which he won the Golden Globe Award for Best Actor in a Motion Picture – Musical or Comedy and was nominated for the Academy Award for Best Adapted Screenplay.

On television, he two British Academy Television Awards for Best Comedy (Programme or Series) and Best Comedy Performance for the satirical sketch comedy series Da Ali G Show (2000–2004). He was nominated for the Golden Globe Award for Best Actor – Television Series Musical or Comedy for the Showtime political satire mockumentary series Who is America? (2018) and the Golden Globe Award for Best Actor – Miniseries or Television Film for the Netflix french political intrigue limited series The Spy (2019). He also received nominations for six Primetime Emmy Awards and a Directors Guild of America Award.

== Major associations ==
=== Academy Awards ===
Year	Category	Nominated work	Result	Ref.
2007	Best Adapted Screenplay	Borat	Nominated	
2021	Best Adapted Screenplay	Borat Subsequent Moviefilm	Nominated	
2021	Best Supporting Actor	The Trial of the Chicago 7	Nominated	

=== BAFTA Awards ===
Year	Category	Nominated work	Result	Ref.
British Academy Television Awards
2000	Best Entertainment Performance	The 11 O'Clock Show	Nominated	
2001	Best Comedy (Programme or Series)	Da Ali G Show	Won	
2001	Best Comedy Performance	Da Ali G Show	Won	

=== Emmy Awards ===
Year	Category	Nominated work	Result	Ref.
2003	Outstanding Non-Fiction Program	Da Ali G Show	Nominated	
2003	Outstanding Writing for a Non-Fiction Program	Da Ali G Show	Nominated	
2005	Outstanding Variety Series	Da Ali G Show	Nominated	
2005	Outstanding Writing for a Variety Series	Da Ali G Show	Nominated	
2019	Outstanding Variety Sketch Series	Who is America?	Nominated	
2019	Outstanding Writing for a Variety Series	Who is America?	Nominated	

=== Golden Globe Awards ===
Year	Category	Nominated work	Result	Ref.
2007	Best Actor in a Motion Picture - Musical or Comedy	Borat	Won	
2019	Best Actor in a Television Series - Musical or Comedy	Who is America?	Nominated	
2020	Best Actor in a Limited Series or a Movie	The Spy	Nominated	
2021	Best Actor in a Motion Picture - Musical or Comedy	Borat Subsequent Moviefilm	Won	
2021	Best Supporting Actor in a Motion Picture	The Trial of the Chicago 7	Nominated	

=== Screen Actors Guild Awards ===
Year	Category	Nominated work	Result	Ref.
2013	Outstanding Cast in a Motion Picture	Les Miserables	Nominated	
2021	Outstanding Cast in a Motion Picture	The Trial of the Chicago 7	Won	
2021	Outstanding Actor in a Supporting Role	The Trial of the Chicago 7	Nominated	

== Miscellaneous awards ==
Year	Association	Category	Project	Result	Ref.
2006	MTV Movie Award	Best Kiss (with Will Ferrell)	Talladega Nights: The Ballad of Ricky Bobby	Won	
2006	Central Ohio Film Critics Association	Actor of the Year	Borat	Nominated	
2006	Chicago Film Critics Association Award	Most Promising Performer	Borat	Nominated	
2006	Empire Award	Best Actor	Borat	Nominated	
2006	Irish Film & Television Awards	Best International Actor	Borat	Nominated	
2006	London Film Critics Circle	British Actor of the Year	Borat	Nominated	
2006	Los Angeles Film Critics Association	Best Actor	Borat	Won	
2006	New York Film Critics Circle	Best Actor	Borat	Nominated	
2006	Online Film Critics Society	Best Actor	Borat	Nominated	
2006	Online Film Critics Society	Best Breakthrough Performance	Borat	Won	
2006	Satellite Award	Best Actor	Borat	Nominated	
2006	San Francisco Film Critics Circle	Best Actor	Borat	Won	
2006	Toronto Film Critics Association	Best Actor	Borat	Won	
2007	Critics' Choice Movie Awards	Best Acting Ensemble	Sweeney Todd: The Demon Barber of Fleet Street	Nominated	
2009	Evening Standard British Film Awards	Peter Sellers Award for Best Comedy	Brüno	Won	
2009	Teen Choice Award	Choice Summer Movie Actor	Brüno	Nominated	
2012	Critics' Choice Movie Awards	Best Acting Ensemble	Les Misérables	Nominated	
2012	National Board of Review	Best Cast	Les Misérables	Won	
2012	Phoenix Film Critics Society	Best Cast	Les Misérables	Nominated	
2012	San Diego Film Critics Society	Best Performance by an Ensemble	Les Misérables	Nominated	
2012	Satellite Award	Best Cast - Motion Picture	Les Misérables	Nominated	
2012	Washington D.C. Area Film Critics Association	Best Ensemble	Les Misérables	Won	
2013	MTV Movie Award	Best Fight	Anchorman 2: The Legend Continues	Nominated	
2020	Capri Hollywood International Film Festival	Best Supporting Actor	The Trial of the Chicago 7	Won	
2020	Critics' Choice Movie Award	Best Supporting Actor	The Trial of the Chicago 7	Nominated	
2020	Houston Film Critics Society	Best Supporting Actor	The Trial of the Chicago 7	Nominated	
2020	London Film Critics' Circle	Supporting Actor of the Year	The Trial of the Chicago 7	Nominated	
2020	MTV Movie Award	Best Actor in a Movie	The Trial of the Chicago 7	Nominated	
2020	San Diego Film Critics Society	Best Supporting Actor	The Trial of the Chicago 7	Nominated	
2020	San Francisco Bay Area Film Critics Circle	Best Supporting Actor	The Trial of the Chicago 7	Nominated	
2020	Satellite Award	Best Supporting Actor – Motion Picture	The Trial of the Chicago 7	Nominated	
2020	St. Louis Gateway Film Critics Association	Best Supporting Actor	The Trial of the Chicago 7	Nominated	
2018	Directors Guild of America Awards	Outstanding Directing – Variety Series	Who Is America?	Nominated	

== See also ==
- List of British actors
- List of British comedians
- List of Academy Award winners and nominees from Great Britain
- List of Jewish Academy Award winners and nominees
- List of actors with Academy Award nominations
- List of Golden Globe winners
