= Ali G: Who Iz I? =

2026 film by Sacha Baron Cohen

- Theatrical release poster
- Directed by: Sacha Baron Cohen
- Screenplay by: Sacha Baron Cohen; Anthony Hines; Peter Baynham; Dan Swimer; Dan Mazer; Keisha Zollar
- Story by: Sacha Baron Cohen; Anthony Hines; Peter Baynham; Dan Swimer; Dan Mazer; Colton Dunn; Vernon Chatman
- Based on: Ali G by Sacha Baron Cohen
- Produced by: Sacha Baron Cohen; Petr Jákl
- Starring: Sacha Baron Cohen; Morgana Robinson
- Cinematography: Chris Darnell; Luke Geissbühler; Markus Mentzer
- Edited by: Craig Alpert; Mark Davies; Michael Giambra; Debra Neil-Fisher
- Music by: Erran Baron Cohen; Nami Melumad
- Production companies: Metro-Goldwyn-Mayer; Four by Two Films; Staines Badman Productions; Working Title Films
- Distributed by: Amazon MGM Studios
- Release dates: 14 October 2026 (Los Angeles); 23 October 2026 (United Kingdom)
- Running time: 89 minutes
- Country: United Kingdom
- Language: English
- Box office: $2.3 million

Ali G: Who Iz I? is a 2026 British mockumentary comedy film written, produced, directed by, and starring Sacha Baron Cohen as Ali G, the character he originally played on the Channel 4 comedy series The 11 O'Clock Show (1998–2000) and Da Ali G Show (2003–2004). Cohen also reprises the characters Dr. Nira Cain-N'Degeocello (a left-wing college professor) and Erran Morad (an Israeli former Mossad agent) from the Showtime series Who Is America? (2018). The film is a sequel to Ali G Indahouse (2002).

Marking Baron Cohen's feature directorial debut, the film was released theatrically on 23 October 2026. It received mixed-to-negative reviews from critics. It comprises a number of scenes with American political figures such as Newt Gingrich, George Santos, Ralph Norman and Andy Harris, who do not know they are being featured in the mockumentary.

== Plot ==
In a direct-to-camera introduction, Ali G recounts the heights of his success with Da Ali G Show, his destitution after its cancellation, and relocating back to Staines-upon-Thames. When he discovers that his long-term girlfriend Julie is pregnant, he unsuccessfully attempts to gain employment and later resorts to pawning his old items, where he discovers a fax from HBO offering him $3.2 million to appear in a third series of Da Ali G Show. Ali and Julie arrive in America, where Ali consumes a lavish brunch with the production crew of his new show until it is discovered that the offer from HBO was 22 years out-of-date and thus has expired. Ali nevertheless resolves to press ahead with production of his show and to instead self-publish it on TikTok. He secures sponsorship from a nutrition company and livestreams interviews combined with modern trends — including ASMR with an army general, a mukbang with Allan Lichtman, and a clothes haul with Arthur B. McDonald.

Meanwhile, news of Ali's return reaches lecturer Nira Cain-N'Degeocello, who perceives Ali as a cultural appropriator. Nira takes to an Oakland community center in attempts to convince the attendees to take a stand against Ali, to which they respond with indifference and mockery. Nira confronts Ali via livestream, promising to seek his destruction due to his politically incorrect rhetoric. Continuing with his livestreams, Ali receives a comment from a user called Rocky, who states he is Ali's father and tells him to call him "ASAP". Ali mistakenly concludes that ASAP Rocky must be his father, thus making him half-black and negating Nira's prior assertions. As Ali's online presence grows, Nira recruits several social justice warriors to his camp, preparing them for warfare against Ali in an effort to prove he is white. They break into Ali's hotel room to recover his DNA, succeeding when Nira poses as Julie and engages in anal sex with him.

One of Nira's recruits confronts Ali with his ancestry results, which prove he is 100% ethnically Scottish. As criticism mounts, Ali holds a summit with representatives of the global community where he apologises via an AI-generated music video depicting himself as Jesus, while other figures including Tupac, Moses, Adolf Hitler, Greta Thunberg, and The Notorious B.I.G. rap about Ali's sex appeal. Just as Julie and Ali are about to fly back home, he learns he has become a symbol against cancel culture and is offered a position as the host of a new show, The Free Speech Show with Ali G. Dismissing Julie's plea to stay with her and raise their child, the two break up. Ali presses on with filming The Free Speech Show, including a game starring George Santos called 'Final Solution' in which "undesirables" are rounded up and placed into gas chambers disguised as showers, and a 'Free Speech' chant accompanied by Nazi salutes. Ali expresses discomfort with the racist script and tells the producers that they are spreading hatred, storming off the set and vowing to return to Julie.

Nira learns of Ali's return and plots to kidnap Julie as revenge. He infiltrates a self-protection class by martial artist Erran Morad and, posing as an ICE agent, convinces the conservative participants that Ali is a drug lord whose birth tourist wife must be deported. They pick Julie up in a makeshift "ambulance" operated by Erran and his volunteers, posing as doctors. She gives birth and, after discerning that Erran's volunteers are impostors, is injected and sedated. Intending to fly her baby to Mexico before birthright citizenship comes into effect, the volunteers place it in a bag and attach the bag to a drone. Ali arrives and follows Erran to the pick-up point, where the baby is taken into the air. Spotting Ali, the volunteers hastily resolve to drop the bag from the sky, thus killing the baby instead.

Ali catches the bag and Morad prepares to kill them both, before Ali recognizes Nira and exposes him as a progressive, horrifying Erran and his volunteers who consider him to be antifa. As they turn on Nira, Ali delivers an impassioned speech telling them to create a better world for the next generation where people aren't killed for their political views. In an epilogue, he reconnects with his real father Rocky and marries Julie in a livestreamed ASMR wedding. Julie starts a foot fetish-focused OnlyFans, and Ali — under his new name Ali McG — begins a Scots-inspired version of Da Ali G Show, as it is revealed that Nira was arrested for sexually assaulting Ali, and that the direct-to-camera framing was from the perspective of Ali's son being told his father's life story.

== Cast ==
- Sacha Baron Cohen as Ali G, Dr. Nira Cain-N'Degeocello and Erran Morad
- Morgana Robinson as Julie Kate Middleton Harris. The character was originally portrayed by Kellie Bright in Ali G Indahouse.

== Production ==
It was reported in July 2025 that Sacha Baron Cohen had been spotted, in character as Ali G, filming in an Oxfordshire zoo. One year later, Baron Cohen was revealed to have shot a new Ali G movie in secret, returning to the role after two decades. Later, during July 2026, he was named as writer and director, and the title was revealed to be Ali G: Who Iz I?.

== Release ==
Ali G: Who Iz I? premiered at the Hollywood Legion Theater in Los Angeles on 14 October 2026, and was released by Amazon MGM Studios on 23 October. The film was advertised as a limited one-weekend theatrical release, but additional screenings were subsequently added across UK cinema chains and in some US cities following the opening weekend.

== Reception ==
=== Box office ===
The film grossed $2,269,818 worldwide, primarily in the United Kingdom, which accounted for $1,798,680, followed by $335,587 in Australia and $102,325 in the Netherlands. This commercial outcome was influenced by a "stunt release" limited five-day theatrical window before streaming on Amazon Prime Video.

=== Viewership ===
It was released on Amazon Prime Video on 28 October 2026 and became the number one movie in twelve countries including the United States, United Kingdom, Ireland, Canada and Australia.

=== Critical response ===
On the review aggregator website Rotten Tomatoes, 39% of 41 critics' reviews are positive, with an average rating of 4.6/10. The website's consensus reads: "Sacha Baron Cohen goes back to a familiar well with diminishing returns in Who Iz I?, a scattershot comedy with some amusing pranks that otherwise only serves to underscore Ali G's faded value." Metacritic, which uses a weighted average, assigned the film a score of 37 out of 100, based on 15 critics, indicating "generally unfavorable" reviews.

Ed Potton of The Times gave the film 4 out of 5 stars, writing "Sacha Baron Cohen pushes comedy to it's limits" and describing the film as "hilarious" and "incredible". Peter Bradshaw of The Guardian gave the film 2 out of 5 stars, stating, "If you suspected that the film was racist, you'll be more emboldened to say so", as well as criticising the lack of a written narrative.
