= Borat's Television Programme =

- Created by: Sacha Baron Cohen
- Starring: Sacha Baron Cohen
- Country of origin: United Kingdom
- No. of episodes: 2

Production
- Running time: 33 minutes

Original release
- Network: Channel 4, E4
- Release: 20 August – 22 August 2004

Borat's Television Programme is a two-part compilation spin-off of Da Ali G Show by Sacha Baron Cohen for the British television station Channel 4. The show features Borat Sagdiyev in the United States learning about the local culture and customs, much in the vein of the later movie Borat: Cultural Learnings of America for Make Benefit Glorious Nation of Kazakhstan and its sequel. The two episodes contain Borat and Brüno segments from Ali G in da USA, along with new and unseen interviews and shenanigans.

== Episodes ==
No.	Episode	Air Date
1.01	"Episode 1"	20 August 2004
1.02	"Episode 2"	22 August 2004

Both episodes were repeated on 1 November 2006 on Channel 4 in preparation for the film's release on 3 November 2006.
