= Super Greg =

Fictional DJ

Super Greg is a fictional DJ created by copywriter Linus Karlsson and creative director Paul Malmström for the Minneapolis advertising agency Fallon McElligott as part of a viral marketing campaign for American jeans company, Lee Jeans in 1999. The campaign launched with a one-page website (www.supergreg.com) and culminated in a TV commercial where Super Greg has a showdown with Lee's mascot, Buddy Lee.

Super Greg was portrayed by Sacha Baron Cohen. Super Greg might have contained inspirational elements in creating his next persona, Ali G.

Super Greg was a site in a set of 3 sites, they were:

- Super Greg, Concept Site
- Curry, Rubberburner
- Roy, Born to Destroy

They were all teasers for a campaign for Lee Jeans. After the campaign the sites directed to Lee Jeans.
