= Natasha Kaplinsky =

English journalist

Natasha Kaplinskyi OBE
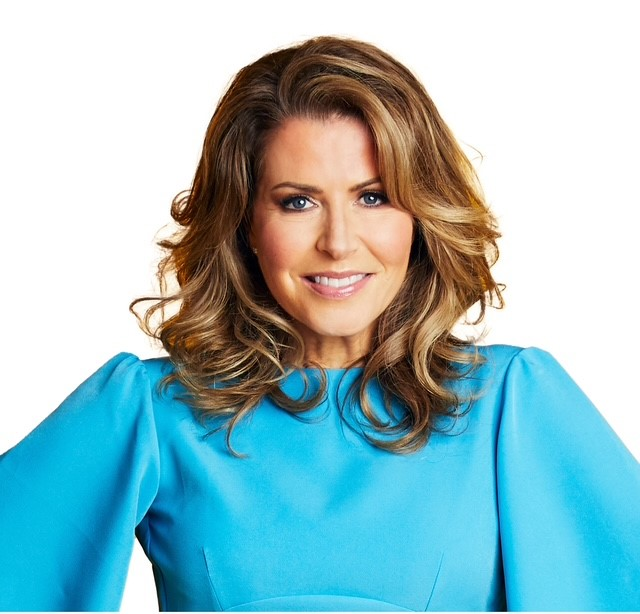
- Born: Natasha Margaret Kaplinsky; 9 September 1972 (age 54); Brighton, Sussex, England
- Education: Hertford College, Oxford
- Occupations: Newsreader, journalist, television presenter
- Years active: 1995–present
- Employer(s): ITN (2011–16); 5 News (2008–10); BBC News (2001–07); Sky News (1999–2001) Granada Talk TV (1996–97)
- Height: 5 ft 4 in (1.63 m)
- Title: President of British Board of Film Classification
- Term: 2022–present
- Spouse: Justin Bower (m. 2005)
- Children: 2
- Father: Raphael Kaplinsky

Natasha Margaret Kaplinsky OBE (born 9 September 1972) is an English newsreader, TV presenter and journalist, best known for her roles as a studio anchor on Sky News, BBC News, Channel 5 and ITV News. In September 2022, she became president of the British Board of Film Classification.

After two years on Sky News, Kaplinsky joined BBC News in 2002 where she co-hosted Breakfast until 2005, when she became the host of the Six O'Clock News. In October 2007, Kaplinsky was recruited to help relaunch Five (now known as Channel 5), reportedly for the highest fee ever paid to a UK newsreader, where she presented a new look, retitled Five News with Natasha Kaplinsky for three years. After leaving Channel 5, she went on to join ITV News as a presenter.

Kaplinsky has hosted light entertainment and factual programmes, including Children in Need and Born to Shine. She was the subject of an episode of Who Do You Think You Are?. She was the winner of the first series of BBC's Strictly Come Dancing in 2004. Kaplinsky has also co-founded a mother and baby company, Mum & You.

In 2014, the Prime Minister David Cameron asked Kaplinsky to become a Holocaust Commissioner leading a project to interview 112 survivors. She was appointed Officer of the Order of the British Empire (OBE) in 2017 for her services to the Holocaust Commission.

== Early life ==
Kaplinsky was born to Raphael Kaplinsky, a South African political refugee, who was professor of International Development at The Open University, and his wife, Catherine Kaplinsky (née Charlewood), a psychotherapist.

Kaplinsky's paternal grandparents were Jewish, originating from the town of Slonim (then part of Poland, now located in western Belarus), who emigrated to South Africa in 1929. Kaplinsky was born in Brighton, but spent her early life in Kikuyu, near Nairobi, Kenya, and has stated that she was fluent in Swahili.

The family emigrated to the United Kingdom and Kaplinsky was brought up in Barcombe, East Sussex. She has a younger brother, born in 1975. She attended Ringmer Community College until the age of sixteen, after which she went to Varndean College in Brighton.

Following her graduation with a degree in English from Hertford College, Oxford, in 1995, one of Kaplinsky's first jobs was working in the press offices of Labour leaders Neil Kinnock and John Smith.

Kaplinsky was the subject of an episode of the BBC's Who Do You Think You Are?, in which well-known people trace their family trees. In the programme, broadcast on 6 September 2007, she followed her paternal line to Slonim and was shown official documentation relating to her cousin's family. That included the death of family members during the "liquidation" (massacre) of the Słonim Ghetto by the Germans, and another's escape to join the partisans during the Second World War and eventual migration to Australia. Her maternal line included an apothecary to King George III.

== Career ==
=== Early career ===
Kaplinsky started out presenting on F2F, a youth chat show, for Granada Talk TV in 1996 with co-host Sacha Baron Cohen. She then moved to presenting early morning news bulletins at Meridian. Within six months, she was co-presenting its evening news programme, Meridian Tonight. In 1999, Kaplinsky moved to ITV's London News Network at which she hosted London Today and London Tonight as well as a political programme called Seven Days.

In November 2000, Kaplinsky joined Sky News, at which she initially co-presented breakfast news programme Sunrise; she later moved to early evening bulletin Live at Five, which she presented alongside Jeremy Thompson.

=== BBC News ===
Kaplinsky joined the BBC in November 2002 to present BBC Breakfast from Monday to Thursday with Dermot Murnaghan, replacing Sophie Raworth who had moved to the BBC News at Six. In October 2005, Kaplinsky left BBC Breakfast to co-present the BBC News at Six alongside George Alagiah, initially covering Raworth's maternity leave. However, the move became permanent when it was announced that Raworth would not return to the programme, instead becoming the main presenter of the BBC News at One.

In 2006, Kaplinsky became only the third (and youngest) woman to present the BBC's Ten O'Clock News.

Kaplinsky was recruited from the Corporation to join Five to help relaunch the channel.

=== Five News ===
On 18 February 2008, Kaplinsky relaunched Five.

On 21 August 2008, Kaplinsky began her first maternity leave from Five, followed by a second period after the birth of her daughter.

On 14 October 2010, Kaplinsky announced that she was leaving her job at Channel 5 at the end of 2010, having spent most of her three years at the network on maternity leave. On 23 December 2010, she presented her final bulletin for Five News.

=== ITV ===
Kaplinsky's first presenting role with ITV was in summer 2011, when she hosted a new Sunday entertainment series, Born to Shine, which raised awareness for the charity Save the Children, of which she is an ambassador.

In September 2011, she made a return to London Tonight, fronting the programme in place of then lead anchor Nina Hossain. In addition, she occasionally presented numerous ITV News programmes.

On 19 August 2013, Kaplinsky presented The People's Medal, a documentary about The Queen's Birthday Honours List.

On 29 October 2013, Kaplinsky hosted the documentary On the Run, alongside journalist Mark Williams-Thomas. The pair then presented a second documentary, Missing Without Trace, on 12 November 2013.

=== Strictly Come Dancing ===
In 2004, Kaplinsky participated in the first series of the celebrity ballroom dancing competition Strictly Come Dancing and went on to win the competition with partner Brendan Cole. Kaplinsky then co-presented the first half of the second series in 2004 with Bruce Forsyth, when regular presenter Tess Daly went on maternity leave. Kaplinsky returned to the show in 2012, taking part in the Christmas Special and in 2018 as part of the BAFTA tribute to Sir Bruce Forsyth.

Week	Dance	Judges' scores	Total	Result
1	Cha-cha-cha / "Chain of Fools"	7,7,8,5	27	Safe
2	Quickstep / "The Lady is a Tramp"	7,8,8,8	31	Safe
3	Jive / "Jump, Jive and Wail"	7,7,5,7	26	Bottom two, saved by judges
4	Foxtrot / "The Girl from Ipanema"	8,9,9,9	35	Safe
5	Samba / "Love Is in the Air"	9,10,9,9	37	Safe
6	Tango / "Libertango"	8,7,8,8	31	Safe
6	Rumba / "Endless Love"	9,9,9,9	36	Safe
7	Waltz / "With You I'm Born Again"	9,9,9,9	36	Safe
7	Paso Doble / "O Fortuna"	8,9,9,9	35	Safe
8	Quickstep / "The Lady is a Tramp"	9,9,9,9	36	Won
8	Samba / "Love Is in the Air"	7,7,9,8	31	Won
8	Showdance / "(I've Had) The Time of My Life"	8,9,9,9	35	Won

=== British Board of Film Classification ===
In 2022, she became the latest president of the British Board of Film Classification (BBFC), after the former president, Patrick Swaffer, stepped down after a 10-year contract.

== Personal life ==
On 21 August 2005, Kaplinsky married investment banker Justin Bower at St Margaret's Church, in the grounds of Babington House, near Frome, Somerset. In April 2008, Kaplinsky announced she was pregnant with their first child, six weeks after her debut on Five News. On 25 September 2008, Five News revealed that Kaplinsky had given birth to a son. On 9 April 2010, Kaplinsky gave birth to a daughter. In 2013, she moved from Fulham, London, to a 200-acre farm near Uckfield, East Sussex. Speaking live on the 14 October 2020 on ITVs This Morning, Kaplinsky revealed she had suffered multiple miscarriages and had participated in Channel 5's discussion Miscarriage: Our Story, broadcast on 15 October 2020.

On 8 February 2011, Kaplinsky commented in a BBC radio interview on Steve Wright in the Afternoon that she and Bower had performed as disguised extras for the English National Ballet although she "had insisted that her name was not used in the programme". In a production of Romeo and Juliet at the London Coliseum, she performed as "Wench Number 7".

Kaplinsky is teetotal and a vegetarian.

=== 2018 boat accident ===
In April 2018, Kaplinsky, her father and eight-year-old daughter, Angelica, were seriously hurt when the boat they were holidaying in burst into flames off the Greek island of Corfu. The family were rescued by local fishermen, who helped put out a fire that had spread from the engine room and towed them ashore. Kaplinsky's daughter was flown back to Britain for emergency treatment. A Corfu Port Authority spokesman said: "The vessel suffered a mechanical failure, which caused a fire in the engine room, which was immediately extinguished by the people on the boat." At first, the girl was rushed to hospital in Corfu Town with burns to her face and hands. Her mother and grandfather were treated at a private clinic. It was then decided to fly them home.

=== Charity ===
Kaplinsky became a celebrity ambassador for the UK charity Save the Children in 2010. For more than a decade, she has been an active ambassador and fundraiser for the charity, travelling extensively around the world for it.

She is a patron of the Bevern Trust and is also an ambassador for Wellbeing of Women. Kaplinsky is also patron of the National Maternity Support Foundation and The Willow Foundation.

Kaplinsky volunteered to record 112 testimonies of Holocaust survivors who had never spoken before. She continues to serve as a board member for the Holocaust Memorial Foundation.

She was appointed Officer of the Order of the British Empire (OBE) in the 2017 Birthday Honours for services to the Holocaust Commission.

In October 2018, Kaplinsky and Michael Sheen became vice presidents (an ambassadorial role) of the Royal Society for Public Health (RSPH).

In July 2019, Kaplinsky was appointed as President for Barnardo's." She was appointed as Chair of The Royal Ballet School in October 2024.

Media offices
Preceded by Patrick Swaffer	President of the British Board of Film Classification; 2022–date	Succeeded by Incumbent
