= Ali G =

Fictional character created by Sacha Baron Cohen

- Da Ali G Show character
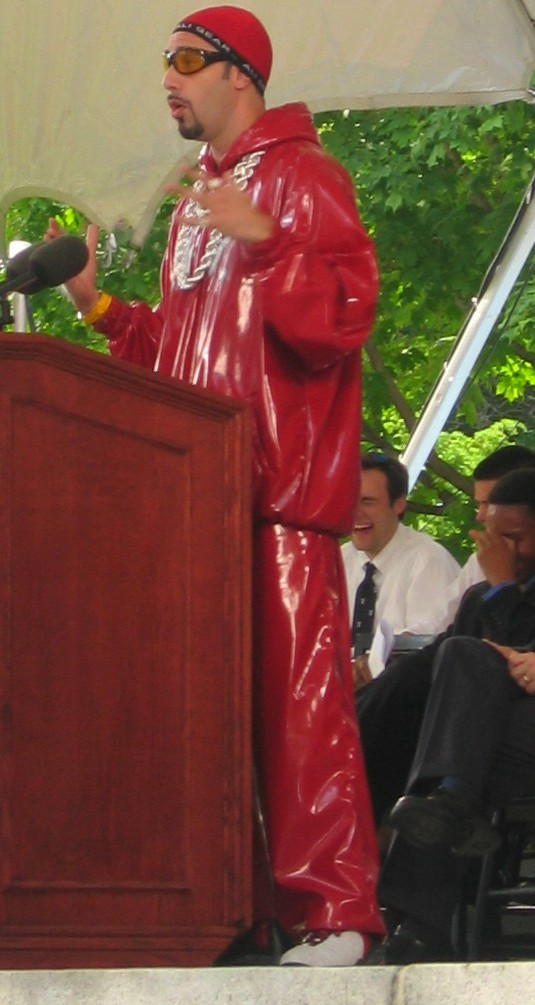
- Ali G giving a commencement speech at Harvard University in 2004
- First appearance: The 11 O'Clock Show (1998)
- Created by: Sacha Baron Cohen
- Based on: Tim Westwood (voice and accent)
- Portrayed by: Sacha Baron Cohen

In-universe information
- Full name: Alistair Leslie Graham
- Occupation: Interviewer; singer; rapper; MP; ambassador; THE man
- Home: Staines-upon-Thames, Surrey, England
- Nationality: British

Alistair Leslie Graham, commonly known as Ali G, is a satirical fictional character created and performed by English comedian Sacha Baron Cohen. Ali G is a white, middle-class, faux-streetwise poseur from Staines-upon-Thames, Surrey, England. The character speaks in rude boy–style Multicultural London English. He usually conducts interviews with unsuspecting subjects who do not realise they have been set up.

Ali G first appeared as the "voice of youth" on Channel 4's The 11 O'Clock Show in Autumn 1998. Subsequently, he became the title character of Da Ali G Show in the early 2000s; he was also the title character of the 2002 film Ali G Indahouse, as well as the 2026 sequel Ali G: Who Iz I?. In a 2001 poll by Channel 4, Ali G was ranked eighth on their list of the 100 Greatest TV Characters.

In a 2007 interview with The Daily Telegraph, Baron Cohen announced that Ali G, along with Borat Sagdiyev (another fictional character made by Baron Cohen), had been retired. However, Ali G returned at the 2012 British Comedy Awards to accept Baron Cohen's Outstanding Achievement Award, causing controversy by making jokes about Kate Middleton and Jimmy Savile. Ali G returned to television with Ali G Rezurection in 2014. Rezurection features new footage of Ali G introducing old highlights of Da Ali G Show, while Borat reappeared for Borat Subsequent Moviefilm in 2020.

On 14 July 2026, Sacha Baron Cohen posted a short video on social media of an Ali G interaction with a public servant. On 22 July, a follow up video was posted announcing the film Ali G: Who Iz I?, which released on 23 October 2026.

== Development ==
Ali G is a fictional stereotype of an English suburban male "chav" also known as Alistair; who imitates inner-city urban British hip-hop culture and British Jamaican culture, particularly through hip-hop, reggae, drum and bass, and jungle music, as well as speaking in rude boy–style Multicultural London English from Jamaican Patois. Ali G was part of a group called the "West Staines Massiv", and grew up near Staines in Langley. He also lived part of his life in Staines.

Baron Cohen has stated that BBC Radio 1 DJ Tim Westwood was an influence on the development of his character. Westwood used to host Radio 1's Rap Show and became known for speaking in a Multicultural London English dialect. Ali G's middle-class credentials mirror Westwood's, as the latter was brought up in Lowestoft as a bishop's son. Prior to his character's first appearance on The 11 O'Clock Show, Baron Cohen had portrayed an early incarnation of him named MC Jocelyn Cheadle-Hume on a show he presented called F2F, which ran on the satellite channel Granada Talk TV. While in character, Baron Cohen chatted to a group of skateboarders and realised that people could be led to believe his character was real; he then filmed a number of segments which were ordered off-air by London Weekend Television.

== History and appearances ==
Ali G, a white middle-class, faux-streetwise poseur with a deeply stereotypical view of the world, first came to prominence on Channel 4's The 11 O'Clock Show as the "voice of youth" in 1998. He interviewed various public figures in the United Kingdom, always either embarrassing his interviewee by displaying a mixture of uninformed political incorrectness, or getting the interviewee to agree to some shocking inaccuracy or insult.

Other examples of his bold interviewing style include getting Lindsay Urwin, the Bishop of Horsham, to admit that God created the universe and then asking him, "And since then, [God]'s just chilled?" Ali G asked the Bishop about God's appearance, to which the Bishop replied, "Well, he's sort of Jesus-shaped." During an interview with James Ferman, former director of the British Board of Film Classification, Ali G asks whether his made-up vulgarities would restrict a film to an over-18 audience, and suggests that film censorship be performed by younger persons who understand contemporary slang. In an interview with the chairman of the Arts Council of England, Gerry Robinson, Ali G's first question was, "Why is the arts so – excuse me French, but – crap?"

Ali G appeared in the 2003 short film Spyz, directed by James Bobin. It showcases Ali G as James Bond in a series of inexplicably occurring action and sex scenes. In 2004, Ali G gave the class day speech at Harvard.

Ali G was in a series of ads for the 2005–06 NBA season, in which he used his brand of off-kilter journalism to interview various NBA stars. The spots were directed by Spike Lee.

Ali G was also featured in the music video "Music" by Madonna as her limo driver. He complains that her "babylons" are not as big as they appear to be on TV and calls her "Maradona" when asking to be in her next video.

Baron Cohen received the Outstanding Achievement Award at the 2012 British Comedy Awards and appeared in character as Ali G to accept the trophy.

In 2015 Ali G appeared at the 88th Academy Awards. Baron Cohen did not tell the ceremony's producers beforehand that he would appear on stage as his Ali G character instead of himself. He and his then-wife, actress Isla Fisher, locked themselves in the bathroom for 40 minutes to secretly put on his costume, after telling people he had food poisoning.

In early July 2026, it was reported that a new Ali G movie had been filmed by Baron Cohen in secret, however no official confirmation or details were released. Later the same week Baron Cohen attended the Wimbledon Men's Singles Final and posted on social media as the character. Later that month, a sequel titled Ali G: Who Iz I? was confirmed, with Amazon MGM Studios scheduling it for a theatrical release on October 23, 2026.

In October of 2026 he appeared in an episode of the online interview show Career Ladder hosted by Max Klymenko.

== Background ==
Ali G is the leader of a fictional gang called "Da West Staines Massiv", who currently lives in his grandmother's garage in a semi-detached house at 36 Cherry Blossom Close, in the heart of the "Staines Ghetto". He was educated at what he calls "da Matthew Arnold Skool", which is a real school in Staines.

Staines, a commuter town to the west of London, is different from the inner city ghetto that Ali G claims. In the same comic vein, he also makes reference to stockbroker belt towns in the area, such as Egham, Langley and Englefield Green with which he contrasts Staines. Despite the incongruous nature of his hometown, he purports to exemplify inner city culture. Ali's full name is later revealed to be Alistair Leslie Graham (revealed in the eponymous film, much to his embarrassment).

Ali G speaks a comical patois in keeping with his delusions of being black with Jamaican ancestry and peppered with such catchphrases as "aight" or "aiii" (alright), "booyakasha", "big up yaself", "wagwaan", "west side", "batty boy", "respek", "for real", "punani", "check it", "wicked" and "keep it real". His trademark hand gesture closely resembles the "dip snap".

== Criticisms ==
Although Baron Cohen has repeatedly stated that Ali G is a parody of suburban, privileged youth acting in a way that they think is typical of black people, some commentators have opined that the force of the humour is derived from stereotypes of blacks, not poseur whites. According to this view of the character, the suburban background written into Ali G's character serves as a false alibi. The sociologist Tara Atluri observed that, by presenting as racially ambiguous, Ali G both exploits minstrel show racial stereotypes for humour and ridicules white minstrel expropriation.

The comedian Felix Dexter has said that he appreciated the humour of an innocent ignoramus confronting an expert with neither understanding the other, but felt that "a lot of the humour is laughing at black street culture and it is being celebrated because it allows the liberal middle classes to laugh at that culture in a safe context where they can retain their sense of political correctness". Fellow comedian Victoria Wood criticised Baron Cohen's style of comedy, saying that his "endless setting up of victims" was "tiresome" and akin to "laughing at lunatics".

Jacob Rees-Mogg, who was once an unwitting subject of an Ali G interview defended the character as "clever, satirical humour which makes ... many of us look foolish, and that's no bad thing," further saying that the "excessive zeal of political correctness, of left-wing po-facery, is crazy ... it's comedy and it is poking fun at society".

Colton Dunn, a writer who works with Baron Cohen, defended the character stating that, "From my point of view, Ali G is not a racist character. Ali G is a tool to expose racists,"

== People interviewed by Ali G ==
- Edwin "Buzz" Aldrin, whom Ali G addresses as "Buzz Lightyear," former astronaut, and the second man to walk on the Moon: Ali asks him if he was "ever jealous of Louis Armstrong", Aldrin has to correct him and reminds him that it was in fact Neil Armstrong who landed on the Moon. Additionally, Ali G asks what will happen when a man walks on the Sun. Ali G also asks whether the "people on the Moon" were friendly or scared of Aldrin upon landing on the Moon. Ali insists that Aldrin should put conspiracy theorists straight, saying "what do you say to all of those conspiracy theorists who come up to you and say, does the Moon really exist?" He also believes that Aldrin was the first person to perform the moonwalk dance, not Michael Jackson.
- David Alderdice, 43rd Lord Mayor of Belfast: Ali refers to him as the "Lord Mayor of Ireland" at the beginning of the interview. He also believed that Terry Wogan was part of the IRA.
- John Gray, author of Men Are from Mars, Women Are from Venus.
- David Beckham, former football player, and Victoria Beckham, a member of the Spice Girls.
- Tony Benn, former Labour MP for Chesterfield, Cabinet Minister and chairman of the Labour Party from 1971 to 1972. Benn is shocked at Ali's stubborn and cynical view of the world. During the interview, Ali expresses his view that the workers who went on strike in 1984 were lazy and pulling a "sickie", and that most people want to chill at home and watch TV instead of having to go to work. Ali suggests to Benn that celebrities and professional athletes such as Frank Bruno should become candidates, instead of barely known politicians who "probably sleep with horses". Benn wrote in his diary on the day of the interview that Ali G had, "no knowledge of history at all but... he was an intelligent guy"; on discovering that the interview was a hoax, he wrote, "it was a fraud to write and say you want to do an interview about young people and politics, then bring this chap along who is an actor and makes you look a proper charlie." Later, he wrote that Cohen had written to him to ask if he would take part in a new film he was making, saying that Benn had been the only person that he'd interviewed who had "dealt seriously with his loud, sexist, materialist image of youth". Benn refused on the grounds that, "You can't be a comedian and a serious politician." However, Benn did end his reply letter with, "You're my main man".
- Rhodes Boyson, former Conservative Education Minister, who agreed with Ali G that the metric system should not be taught in schools because, "one deals in quarters and eighths of ounces".
- Pat Buchanan, former White House Communications Director to President Ronald Reagan, political commentator and former presidential candidate: Ali makes an irrelevant comparison of lying to become United States President, to himself falsely claiming to work hard at McDonald's but instead admitted to Buchanan that he ate 15 McChicken sandwiches a day, sold marijuana and that he wore the costume of Ronald McDonald while having sex. During the interview, he mistakenly refers to WMD bombs as BLT sandwiches. Buchanan apparently assumes he is referring to bio-lethal toxins; but near the end, he asks Buchanan "is it ever worth fighting a war over sandwiches".
- Boutros Boutros-Ghali, former Secretary General of the United Nations, mistakenly called 'Boutros Boutros Boutros Boutros Ghali' by Ali G. Boutros-Ghali clearly went so far as to participate in some of Ali G's notorious word games and providing the epilogue to the episode where, at Ali G's bidding, he tells youth viewers 'I am Boutros Boutros-Ghali; put down your guns and listen to Bob Marley.' In response to Ali G's perceived ignorance, Boutros-Ghali provides a detailed explanation about why Disneyland is not represented in the United Nations, and reveals which foreign languages sound comical to his ear.
- Noam Chomsky, MIT professor and linguist: During this interview, Ali G is perplexed about the difference between the terms "bilingual" and "bisexual" after asking if his "4-year-old part-Bangladeshi and part-English cousin will grow up to speak both languages".
- Jarvis Cocker, Pulp singer
- Linda Cohn, ESPN anchor
- Gaz Coombes, Supergrass singer
- Paul Daniels (1938–2016), magician
- Sam Donaldson, ABC news journalist for over 45 years: In the interview, Ali G confuses President Nixon's Watergate scandal with films Waterworld and Stargate, and adds that the media should make it clearer for younger people. At the end of the interview, Ali admits to not paying taxes.
- Mohamed Al-Fayed, former owner of Harrods and former chairman of Fulham F.C. Ali G asked him "if he had ever considered selling everything for a pound, there's a shop in Egham that's always full", Fayed replied, "maybe next sale".
- Marlin Fitzwater, former White House Press Secretary to US presidents George H. W. Bush and Ronald Reagan: Ali asks Fitzwater "was it embarrassing working as a secretary, did it have the stigmata as working as a male nurse". Ali G expresses his belief that men who use the words "discussion" and "conflict" are homosexuals. Fitzwater ends the interview after calling Ali G an idiot due to Ali asking if he knows any secrets and implying that Hillary Clinton was a lesbian.
- Jerome Friedman, MIT professor of physics and 1990 Nobel Prize winner
- John Kenneth Galbraith, economist and public intellectual
- Daryl Gates, former Los Angeles Police Chief: Shortly after the interview begins, Ali asks him "what was it like being the head of the NYPD?". After Gates corrects him, Ali blames a language barrier as the cause of the misunderstanding, adding "well you says tomato, I says potato". During the midst of the interview, Ali confuses O. J. Simpson with Homer Simpson. Ali asks for information regarding criminals who swallow condoms which contain drugs and pretends to write down the information given to him, implying that he will later use the information practically. At the end of the interview, Ali incorrectly refers to him as Bill Gates.
- Newt Gingrich, former Speaker of the United States House of Representatives: At the very beginning of the interview, he spends nearly one minute asking Gingrich how to spell and pronounce his name. Ali expresses his concern that if a female ever became President of the United States then she would spend too much time buying facial products, shopping and new shoes, also saying that a female president would elect George Clooney and Brad Pitt as part of the cabinet administration. Gingrich replies "I think if you said that to most women who could be President, you'd be surprised how tough they are" and also citing Margaret Thatcher as one of the three best prime ministers of the 20th century. Ali is also worried that a female elected president would start crying if the U.S. were at war and that she would "get more and more hornier" if a rival did "bad things" to the U.S. as "women love bastards".
- Neil Hamilton, former Conservative politician.
- Kent Hovind, evangelist and Young Earth creationist: During the interview, Ali G repeatedly says "shame on you" to Hovind due to believing that he did not flush the toilet whilst backstage. Ali also believes that humans are descended from monkeys on the basis that Hovind admitted to eating a banana, according to Ali, his admission serves as proof. Ali then proceeds to shut down Hovind, telling him to "speak to the hand because the face ain't listening, yo".
- Richard James Kerr, deputy director of the Central Intelligence Agency to George H. W. Bush: Ali G asked Kerr what kind of punishment should suicide terrorists face, after blowing themselves up. He also expresses his belief to Kerr that threatening suicide bombers with 20 years in prison may act as a deterrent.
- Glenn Hubbard, former professional baseball player
- John Humphrys, BBC presenter / journalist
- Derrick Hussey, publisher and proprietor of Hippocampus Press
- Reed Irvine, founder of Accuracy in Media
- Ernie Johnson Jr., sports broadcaster
- Steve Kerr, former American professional basketball player who, according to Ali G, works on "TMT", and was the Most Valuable Player, or "MP3" of the NBA.
- C. Everett Koop, former Surgeon General of the United States to George H. W. Bush and Ronald Reagan: during the interview, Ali cannot comprehend why his erection is not actually a bone. He accuses Dr. Koop of being a "player hater" when the doctor breaks the news that all people will eventually die, and tries to convince the Surgeon General that his deceased pet cat was actually human. Ali suggests removing the organs out of the human body and replacing them with a mobile phone. He also asks why the human heartbeat is "so old fashioned", and his "homies" would look after and respect their heart if they had a drum and bass heartbeat that they could relate to. Ali also asks the Surgeon General why all skeletons are involved in "evil stuff."
- James Lipton, host of Bravo's Inside the Actors Studio. Ali G accuses Lipton of homosexual behavior because he cries while watching films. Lipton expresses that he hates the word "hoe" so Ali instead uses the word "bitches" to describe his opinion that women are better "actors" than men.
- Ralph Nader, consumer activist and former US presidential candidate for the Green Party in 1996 & 2000: Ali wonders what is the big deal with saving the rainforest because he believes no one has ever lived there and there is not a KFC or McDonald's nearby. After discovering that people do live there, he believes that one would have to be crazy to live there due to the danger of a monkey defecating on a person's head. While talking about how to save money on electricity, unknown to Ali G, he admits to illegally rigging his home electrical meter and doing Nader a favor after he is "well negative about it".
- Thomas J. Pickard, former acting FBI Director: Ali G asks Pickard if he knows what is in the basement of Studio 54, referring to the X-Files. After he acknowledges what he is implying, Ali hums the X-Files theme tune.
- Gail Porter, television presenter
- Sue Ramsey, Irish politician, Sinn Féin
- Sally Jessy Raphaël, former talk show host, (who congratulated him for 'being himself')
- Jacob Rees-Mogg, Conservative Party parliamentary candidate, investment banker and future MP for North East Somerset (2010–2024). Ali incorrectly addresses him as "Lord Rees-Mogg". He asks him "which class is Pakis in" and wonders if he impregnated the daughter of a lord, which class would the baby belong to. During the interview, he borrows a top hat from Rees-Mogg, believing he would be upper-class if he wore it, Rees-Mogg compares him to Lord Snooty.
- Andy Rooney, of the CBS programme 60 Minutes, who repeatedly corrects Ali G's poor grammar, and responds angrily to Ali G's foolish questions about the current state of the media. (It is worth noting that Ali G wonders whether the media would ever publish the results of a presidential election early; while Rooney dismisses this idea as preposterous, this is precisely what the Chicago Daily Tribune did in 1948, falsely reporting that Thomas E. Dewey had defeated Harry S. Truman). Rooney thus furiously and abruptly ends his interview, claiming a busy schedule. Ali G then characterizes Rooney's treatment of him as "racialist," using a British variant of the word "racist," the former of which Rooney (an American) does not recognize as any type of real word.
- Charles Schultze, former Chief Economic Advisor to President Jimmy Carter
- Brent Scowcroft, former National Security Advisor and Air Force General
- Tomasz Starzewski, fashion designer: At the very beginning of the interview, Ali G thinks Starzewski's suit is made out of vaginal hair. Starzewski was offended when Ali asked if he would make clothes for any woman, "even if she has nice personality but a face like a rottweiler's ass", believing that it would bring on shame for Starzewski's clothing brand if he decided to make clothes for unattractive women. At the end of the interview, Ali assumed that he was happy when fashion designer, Gianni Versace, was murdered as "there was less competition".
- Teddy Taylor, former MP for the Conservative Party: Ali expresses his belief that most countries in Europe are "crap countries", he also thinks it is racist as a result of Jamaica not being part of Europe. He asks Taylor if himself will still be able to buy pornography "with dogs and women" and if that particular category will be available in the UK. At the end of the interview, Ali G suggests that if people want to join Europe then they should have a "brian", referring to a human brain.
- Dick Thornburgh, former U.S. Attorney General and governor of Pennsylvania. While both men are discussing murder and the law, Ali believes it is justifiable to murder someone "if they call your mum or nana a hoe". Ali has a hard time distinguishing the meaning of a "hung jury" and an erection, Thornburgh laughs and wishes he made it clearer for Ali. In the interview, he wonders if "whoever smelt it deal it", in reference to farting, is a crime in the United States. He also believes if a prisoner on the death penalty is given a free meal then the person would be able to eat forever, subsequently avoiding the execution.
- Edwin Meese, former United States Attorney General and counsellor to President Ronald Reagan. Ali G is baffled that it is illegal to steal a person's television but not their girlfriend, implying that a girlfriend should become property and even suggesting that the government should do something about it. After Meese discovers that he has been pranked, he agrees to say "I was attorney general, my name is Meese, I say go to college and don't carry a piece."
- Stansfield Turner, former director of Central Intelligence Agency: After Turner explains what the CIA stands for, Ali asks "so does it help if you is intelligent if you want to get in", Ali believes it is "racialist" that the CIA will not hire stupid people. His concern and definition of racist is "ain't it unfair for those people who will feel bad inside if you won't allow them in there", Turner immediately laughs and Ali questions his reason for laughing. Turner politely remarks that Ali is intelligent after asking if he could ever join the CIA. Ali believes that female undercover CIA agents have cameras attached to their vagina and that they wear uniforms whilst on special missions. At the end of the interview, he questions "how do we actually know Louie Armstrong was actually stood on the moon", and he expresses his belief to Turner that Kevin Costner knew who murdered President JFK.
- Donald Trump, real estate developer and reality TV presenter; 45th and 47th president of the United States of America. In the interview lasting under two minutes, Ali G proposes a business idea to Trump: arguing that, although ice cream is "the most popular thing in the world", it is flawed due to the ease with which it melts. Trump suggests that Ali is pitching him a "drip-proof ice cream": which Ali denies, though praises the idea and urges Trump not to release such a product, to which he complies stating "I promise you I won't". Ali proceeds to pitch him the "ice cream glove": a piece of hand-wear which Ali believes will prevent ice cream from dripping on one's hands during consumption, to which Trump replies "well, it sounds like a good idea and I hope you make a lot of money" before walking off the set.
- Lindsay Urwin, the Bishop of Horsham.
- Gore Vidal, author and essayist (whom Ali G mistook for Vidal Sassoon).
- Christine Todd Whitman, first female and former New Jersey governor and United States Environmental Protection Agency administrator: Ali is concerned about solar energy and worries that the sun will run out of energy and fuel if humans continue to use solar energy, he adds that Alaska has already "overused" the sun as "there is like darkness for months every year". After asking why the ocean is dirty, his proof is that fishes and whales are defecating too much and that humans should tell the fish not to defecate in the water.
- Sammy Wilson, Northern Irish politician, Democratic Unionist Party.
- Naomi Wolf, former political advisor to Bill Clinton and Al Gore, author and feminist: Ali expresses his concern that if women are granted human rights in the workplace then they will start asking for human rights at home. He also adds that men are the best cooks in the world and uses Colonel Sanders and Ronald McDonald as examples, compared to "Wendy"; the mascot of Wendy's Fast-food Restaurant, Wolf surprisingly agrees with him. Ali baits Wolf by expressing his view that women have better job opportunities than men, such as lap dancers, extras in music videos and strippers. He gives Wolf a "compliment" by saying that she could possibly work as a prostitute due to her attractiveness.
- Heinz Wolff, scientist and former emeritus professor of bioengineering at Brunel University: Ali asks if "knob enlargements" are in correlation with science. He also asks "is infinite a number" and is unconvinced by Wolff's explanation, repeatedly saying "million" and "billion" and asking if it is smaller than the given numbers. Wolff says that he could always add 1 to each given number, Ali ends the interview by saying "and that number is infinity?" To which Wolff replies 'no'.
- Professional basketball players Steve Nash (who was an award-winning player "MP3" according to Ali G and unable to speak proper English due to being Canadian), Kobe Bryant (whom he asks about the number of springs in a basketball), Ben Wallace (who he accuses of "playa-hating"), Shaquille O'Neal (whom he argued with about the meaning of the NBA, Ali thinking it stood for Nationwide Basketball Society), Tim Duncan (from whom he tried to get a pair of free trainers), Robert Horry, Dwyane Wade (who he did not realise was an NBA player, claiming he had just "sneaked in" to "hang with mah man Shaquille O'Neal"), Richard Jefferson (whom he called Thomas Jefferson's son), Charles Barkley, Kenny Smith and Reggie Miller.

== Discography ==
- "Me Julie" (2002), single with Shaggy from the soundtrack to the film Ali G Indahouse.

== In popular culture ==
- In an episode of the MTV clay animated series Celebrity Deathmatch, titled "Night of Comedy Comeback", there is a fight to the death between Ali G and Jamie Kennedy. The fight ended with Jamie slashing Ali G's stomach open with his own necklace.
- He is referenced in songs such as "Couch Potato" by "Weird Al" Yankovic, "Audacity" by Stormzy, "Country Star" by AJ Tracey, and "Post Verified Lifestyle" by JPEGMAFIA.
- German band Scooter used many of Ali G's catchphrases in the lyrics on their 2001 studio album "We Bring The Noise!", for example "aiii", "booyaka", "west side", "punani", and "check it".
