= Dan Baron Cohen =

British playwright and theatre director (born 1957)

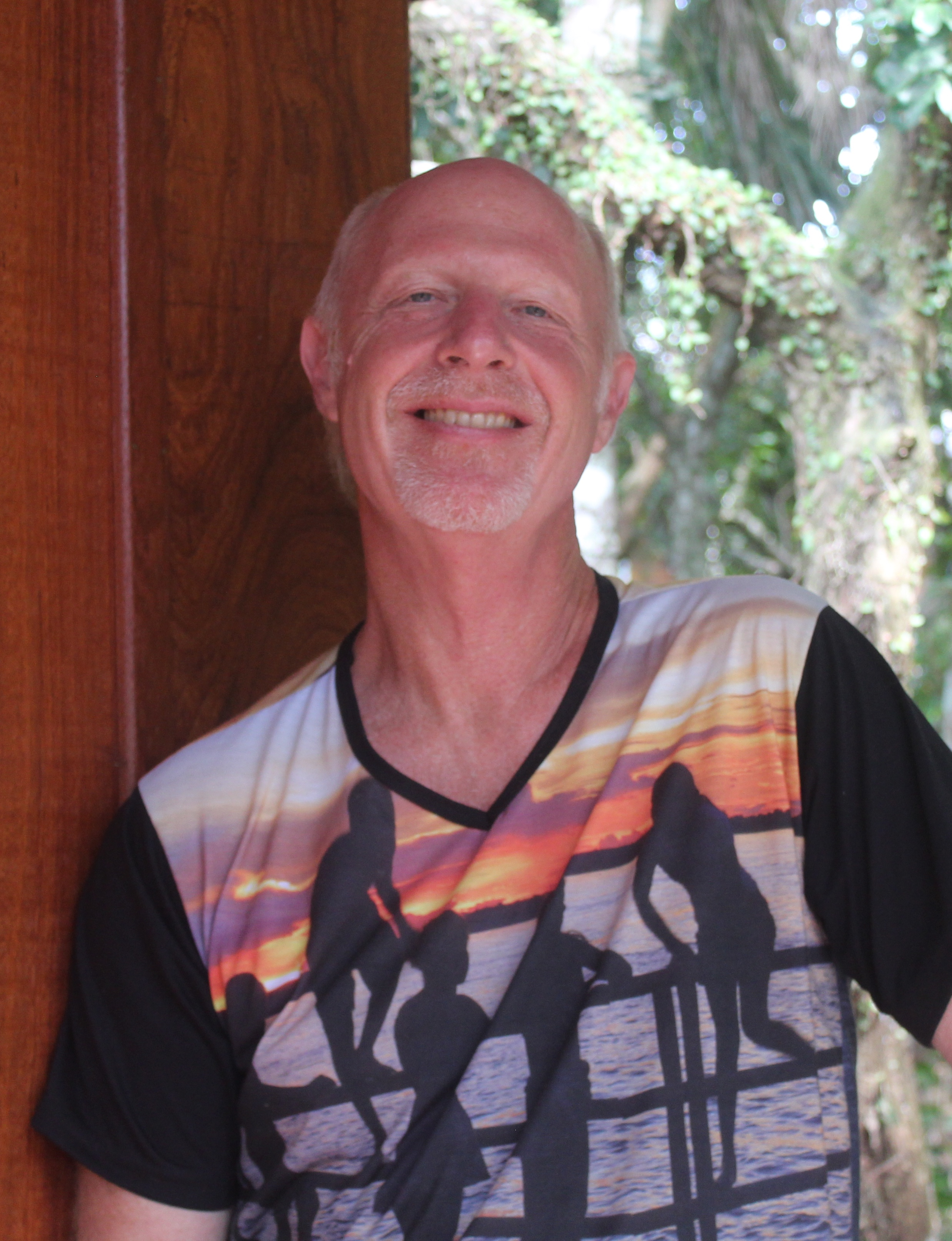
Dan Baron Cohen in 2021

Dan Baron Cohen (born 8 May 1957) is a playwright, community-theatre director, cultural theorist and arts-educator of Welsh-Canadian origin, currently living and working in Brazil.

== Biography ==
Dan Baron Cohen is a community-based artist and arts-educator and eco-cultural activist who divides his year living and working in the Brazilian Amazonian city of Marabá and the southern city of Florianópolis. After undergraduate and post-graduate studies in Oxford University, Dan worked with English playwright Edward Bond (1981–85) and Kenyan playwright Ngũgĩ wa Thiong’o (1984–5), before developing residential collaborative projects with young people and their post-industrial and at-risk communities in Manchester (Frontline: Culture & Education, North-West England, 1984–88), Derry (Derry Frontline, North of Ireland, 1988–94), and the Rhondda Valleys (Rational Theatre Company, South Wales, 1994–98).

In 1998, an invitation to develop a five-month community theatre collaboration at the State University of Santa Catarina (UDESC), southern Brazil, launched collaborations with landless, indigenous, trade-union and university communities in Brazil. Between 1999 and 2003, Dan and his Brazilian collaborator Manoela Souza coordinated the collective community-based national monuments 'The Castaheiras of Eldorado dos Carajás' (Landless Workers Movement, Amazon), and '500 Years of Resistance by the Indigenous Peoples of Brazil' (Monte Pascoal, Bahia), and the mural 'Land is Life' (Landless Workers Movement, Santa Catarina, 2001–23). In 2004, Dan Baron Cohen and Manoela Souza founded the Transformance Institute: Culture & Education, deepening and extending their pedagogies of transformation.

Between 2004 and 2010, Dan was President of IDEA (International Drama/Theatre & Education Association), co-founder and President of the World Alliance for Arts Education (2006–10), and member of the International Council of the World Social Forum. During that period, sustained residencies throughout Brazil developed performance-based pedagogies of cultural action for social transformation, in collaboration with arts education networks in Africa, Asia, Latin America, North America and Europe.

These 'transformance' techniques have been applied to develop community security, teacher education and youth-led advocacy for a paradigm of good living, sustained by solar energy, notably in the Transformance Institute's current fifteen-year project in the urban Amazonian community of Cabelo Seco, in Marabá City. This paradigm project has won numerous regional, national and international awards.

== Publications ==
Dan Baron Cohen has published Theatre of Self-Determination (Derry, 2001), (ISBN 978-0946451623), Alfabetização Cultural: a luta íntima por uma nova humanidade (Cultural Literacy: the intimate struggle for a new humanity), São Paulo 2004, (ISBN 978-8589147026), Colheita em Tempos de Seca: cultivando pedagogias de vida por comunidades sustentáveis (Harvest in Times of Drought: cultivating pedagogies of life for sustainable communities), Marabá 2011, (ISBN 978-85-65067-00-3), chapters for Routledge, Palgrave Macmillan and IDEA publications, and numerous articles, most recently for New Internationalist magazine.

== Personal life ==
Dan's siblings include the academic Simon Baron-Cohen, the filmmaker Ash Baron-Cohen, and the therapist Aliza Baron Cohen. He is a cousin of actor Sacha Baron Cohen.

== Sources ==
- Bailey, Dominic (14 April 2003). "Living with Brazil's landless". BBC News.
