= Pups (film) =

1999 film by Ash Baron-Cohen

- DVD cover
- Directed by: Ash Baron-Cohen (as Ash)
- Written by: Ash Baron-Cohen
- Produced by: Daniel M Berger
- Starring: Mischa Barton; Cameron Van Hoy; Burt Reynolds
- Cinematography: Carlos Arguello
- Edited by: Michael Schultz
- Music by: Erran Baron Cohen
- Distributed by: Allied Entertainment Group
- Release dates: April 18, 1999 (premiere); March 31, 2000 (limited)
- Running time: 103 minutes
- Country: United States
- Language: English

Pups is a 1999 American independent crime drama film written and directed by Ash, and starring Mischa Barton, Burt Reynolds and Cameron Van Hoy. The film centers on two young adolescents who embark on a bank robbery on their way to school. It premiered at the Los Angeles Independent Film Festival on April 18, 1999. Although well received critically, the film saw a limited release, which has been attributed to sensitivity surrounding the Columbine High School massacre that occurred two days after the premiere.

== Plot ==
Stevie finds a gun in his mother's closet, and on his way to school with his girlfriend, Rocky, decides to use the gun to rob a bank. The police come and surround the building. One FBI agent, Daniel Bender, tries to free the hostages. Initially he is calm and cooperative, giving food, condoms, beer and an MTV reporter by request.

As the situation furthers, Bender gets frustrated. After several failed attempts at impossible requests, Stevie decides to surrender. Rocky and he leave the guns, money, and hostages in the bank. As the two walk away, Stevie reaches for a flower in his pocket, and a sniper shoots him dead. Bender asks to get that "mother fucker down from that roof".

== Cast ==
- Mischa Barton as Rocky
- Burt Reynolds as Daniel Bender
- Cameron Van Hoy as Stevie
- Ed Metzger as Mr. Edwards
- Kurt Loder as Himself
- David Alan Graf as Bank Manager
- Darling Narita as Joy
- Susan Horton as Rio
- James Gordon as J.P. / TV Preacher
- Jonathan Coogan as Bank Security Guard
- Matthew Fairchild as Rocky's Dad
- Adam Farrar as War Vet Paraplegic

== Production ==
The film is set in an unnamed American suburb and was shot in Chatsworth, Los Angeles. It was financed by Japan-based Team Okuyama in October 1998, with the condition that filming would be complete by December of the same year. The film was shot in two weeks in December 1998. The director, Ash noted that the film was timely within the context of real-life crimes during this period, alluding to the 1998 Westside Middle School shooting: "The film was a reflection of what was going on in Jonesboro and around the world." As well as the controversy of the Columbine killings, the release of the film was complicated by the arrest of one of its co-stars, Adam Farrar. Farrar had been arrested in March 1999 on suspicion of attempted murder and making terrorist threats against his girlfriend.

== Critical reception ==
The film was well received by critics; it currently holds a 90% 'fresh' rating on Rotten Tomatoes. Robert Koehler of Variety praised the execution of the film "Applying all the assets of seat-of-your-pants indie filmmaking with few of its deficits, Ash has delivered a sinewy, disturbing sophomore work... Pups gives off the energy of a movie shot on the run with few of the rough edges that typically dog such rapid-fire filmmaking." Koehler continued to single out the picture as a "perceptive spin on the teen pic". Koehler also praised the casting "Van Hoy leads the way, with a startling, haunting film debut that matches pic's sense of impulse, rage and humanism. Barton quietly suggests a smart girl who knows she's in trouble but might find a way out. Besieged on all sides, Reynolds works against his character's cliches and indicates that Boogie Nights was no fluke."

Roger Ebert of the Chicago Sun-Times gave the film three out of four stars, congratulating Van Hoy and Barton for "two of the most natural and freed performances I have seen by actors of any age...Often Van Hoy and Barton waltz through long takes, working without the net of editing...So much depends on the performances. If instead of Van Hoy and Barton the movie had starred safer or more circumspect actors, the energy would have flagged and the flaws of the quick production would have been more of a problem."

Lawrence Van Gelder of the New York Times described the protagonists, Stevie and Rocky as "Bonnie and Clyde for the MTV generation." He praised Ash for "taking a knowing look at adolescents informed but not educated by television and movies in a less than perfect United States." Van Gelder also praised Van Hoy for his portrayal of "a volatile, fast-talking compendium of pop culture, childish rage, adolescent mischief and adult stupidity and remorse." And Barton also, "in a layered performance, combines loyal girlfriend and voice of reason with deep cynicism toward the world she was born into and now is shaping."

Entertainment Weekly gave the film a "B+", praising Ash as "a genuine provocateur-filmmaker." The review also congratulated the "energized performance" of Reynolds and Van Hoy, who "is amazing, like a Game Boy junkie-turned-virtual Jimmy Cagney." The reviewer also speculated that the film could have been a sensation at Sundance had it not been for the recent Columbine tragedy.

=== Awards and honors ===
Year	Award	Category	Result
1999	Chicago International Film Festival	"Gold Hugo award for New Directors Competition" - Ash	Nominated
1999	Stockholm International Film Festival	"Bronze Horse" - Ash	Nominated
1999	Festival du Film Policier de Cognac	"'New Blood' Award" - Ash	Won
2000	Yubari International Fantastic Film Festival	"Grand Jury Prize-Feature" - Ash	Won
