= Ash Baron-Cohen =

English filmmaker

- Born: Ashley Louis Baron-Cohen; Hampstead, London, England
- Education: University of Sussex
- Occupations: Film director, screenwriter, film producer
- Notable work: This Girl's Life
- Relatives: Sir Simon Baron-Cohen (brother); Dan Baron Cohen (brother); Sacha Baron Cohen (cousin); Erran Baron Cohen (cousin)

Ashley Louis Baron-Cohen, also known mononymously as Ash, is an English filmmaker. He has a bachelor's degree in experimental psychology from University of Sussex, and trained as a filmmaker at the ArtCenter College of Design in Pasadena, CA. He currently resides in Los Angeles.

Baron-Cohen is known for such films as Bang and This Girl's Life.

While in film school, he persuaded Richard Harris to leave the set of Clint Eastwood's Unforgiven to star in his student film for free.

== Filmography ==
- 1995 Bang
- 1999 Pups
- 2002 The Blind Bastards Club
- 2002 Little Warriors
- 2003 This Girl's Life
- 2005 The Confession
- 2009 Radioactive
- 2009 Novella

== Awards ==
- 1997 – Bang – Top Ten Movies of the Year – Roger Ebert
- 1997 – Bang – Top Ten Movies of the Year – Los Angeles Times
- 1997 – Bang – Spirit Award Nominee – Best Newcomer
- 1999 – Stockholm Film Festival – Nominated for "Bronze Horse" Award for Pups
- 2000 – Cognac Festival du Film Policier – Won "New Blood" Award for Pups
- 2000 – Yubari International Fantastic Film Festival – Won "Special Jury Prize" for Pups
- 2005 – Little Warriors – U.S. TV Guide Winner – Outstanding Biographical Program

== Personal life ==
His siblings include the academic Sir Simon Baron-Cohen and the playwright Dan Baron Cohen. He is the cousin of actor and comedian Sacha Baron Cohen.

Baron-Cohen is legally blind without his contact lenses.
