= The Jolly Boys' Last Stand =

- Directed by: Chris Payne
- Written by: Chris Payne
- Produced by: Craig Woodrow; Richard Conway
- Starring: Andy Serkis; Milo Twomey
- Cinematography: Robin Cox; Will Jacob
- Edited by: Tullio Bruno
- Music by: Jeremy Panufnik
- Production company: Jolly Productions
- Distributed by: Spirit Level
- Release date: 18 August 2000 (London)
- Running time: 88 minutes
- Country: United Kingdom
- Language: English

The Jolly Boys' Last Stand is a 2000 British satirical drama film written and directed by Chris Payne, and starring Andy Serkis and Milo Twomey with British comedian Sacha Baron Cohen in a minor role.

== Plot ==
When Spider (played by Serkis), the President of a young men's drinking club becomes engaged, his oldest friend and best man, Des, (Twomey) decides to film the run up to the wedding as a gift to the betrothed – secretly hoping the on‐screen carnage will de‐rail the marriage.
