= Sacha Baron Cohen =

English actor and comedian (born 1971)

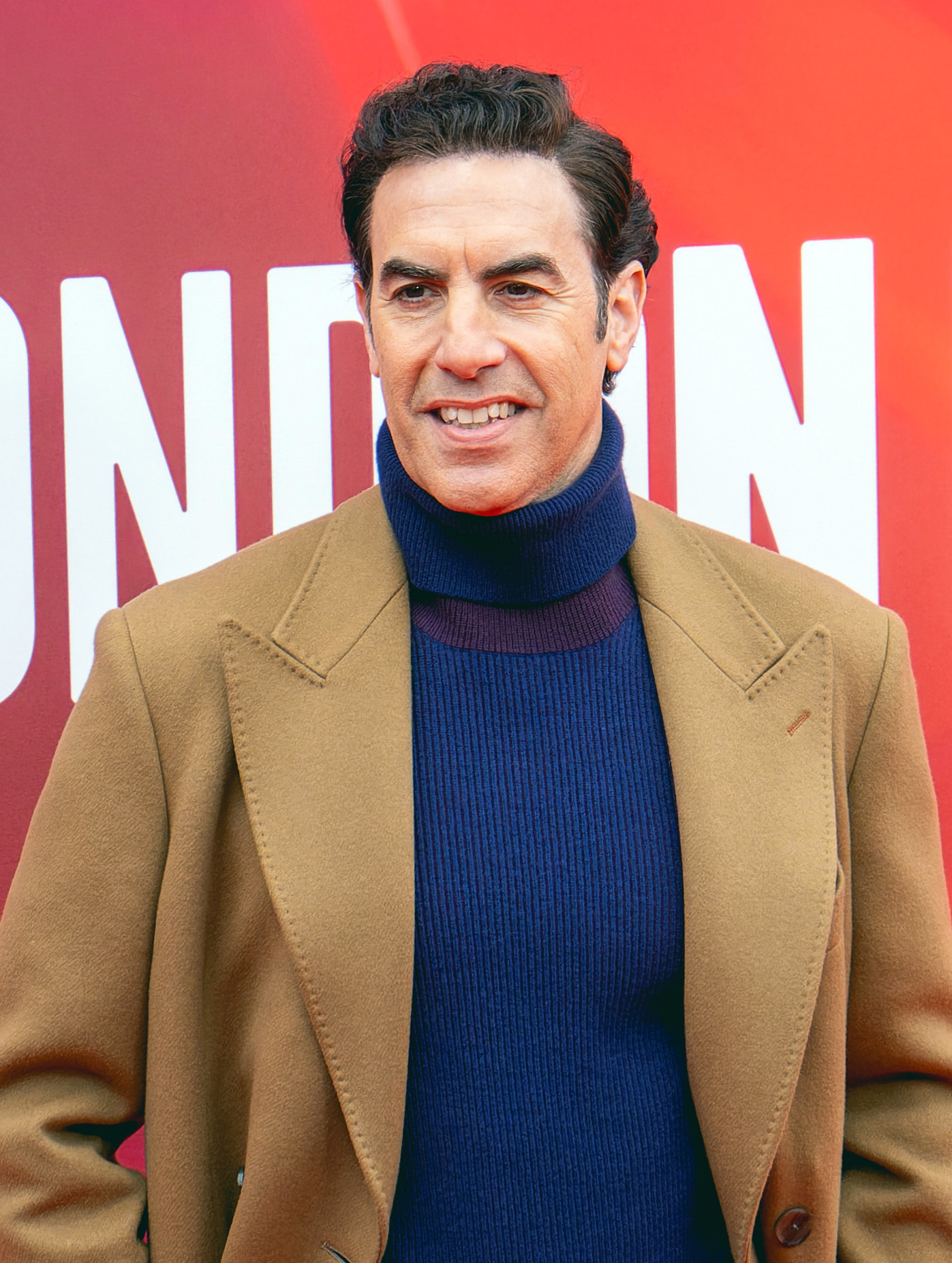
- Baron Cohen in 2024
- Born: Sacha Noam Baron Cohen; 13 October 1971 (age 55); Hammersmith, London, England
- Education: Christ's College, Cambridge (BA)
- Occupations: Actor; comedian; filmmaker
- Years active: 1995–present
- Spouse: Isla Fisher (m. 2010; div. 2025)
- Children: 3
- Relatives: Erran Baron Cohen (brother); Ash Baron-Cohen (cousin); Sir Simon Baron-Cohen (cousin); Dan Baron Cohen (cousin)
- Awards: Full list
- Website: sachabaroncohen.co.uk

Sacha Noam Baron Cohen (/ˈsæʃə/ SASH-ə; born 13 October 1971) is an English actor, comedian, filmmaker and advocate. Known for his creation and portrayal of the fictional satirical characters Ali G, Borat Sagdiyev, Brüno Gehard, and Admiral General Haffaz Aladeen, he has received various accolades, including three Golden Globes Awards and two British Academy Television Awards, as well as nominations for three Academy Awards and six Primetime Emmy Awards. For his character work, Baron Cohen has been described as a performance artist.

Baron Cohen graduated from University of Cambridge and trained at École Philippe Gaulier, before finding fame on the late-night television series The 11 O'Clock Show (1998–1999), winning the British Comedy Award for Best Male Newcomer, before creating and starring as his character Ali G in the satirical sketch comedy show Da Ali G Show (2000–2004), for which he received two British Academy Television Awards. He created and starred in the Showtime satirical mockumentary series Who Is America? (2018), for which he earned a nomination for the Golden Globe Award for Best Actor – Television Series Musical or Comedy. He portrayed Eli Cohen in the Netflix limited series The Spy (2019), earning a Golden Globe Award for Best Actor – Miniseries or Television Film nomination, and acted in the Apple TV+ limited series Disclaimer (2024). He starred as Mephisto in the Marvel Cinematic Universe, beginning with the miniseries Ironheart (2025).

Baron Cohen wrote and starred in Borat (2006) and Borat Subsequent Moviefilm (2020), which earned him the Golden Globe Award for Best Actor in a Motion Picture – Musical or Comedy as well as a nomination for the Academy Award for Best Adapted Screenplay. For his portrayal of Abbie Hoffman in the legal drama The Trial of the Chicago 7 (2020) he was nominated for the Academy Award for Best Supporting Actor. He also wrote, produced and starred in the comedy films Ali G Indahouse (2002), Brüno (2009), The Dictator (2012) and Grimsby (2016) and has acted in drama films such as Sweeney Todd: The Demon Barber of Fleet Street (2007), Hugo (2011) and Les Misérables (2012).

Baron Cohen voiced King Julien XIII in the Madagascar film series (2005–2012) and Uncle Ugo in Luca (2021). He has been a member of the Academy of Motion Picture Arts and Sciences in the Actors Branch since 2008.

== Early life and education ==
Sacha Noam Baron Cohen was born into a Jewish family in the Hammersmith area of London on 13 October 1971. His mother, photographer Daniella (née Weiser), was born in Mandatory Palestine in 1939 to German Jewish parents. His father, editor-turned-clothing-store owner Gerald "Jerry" Baron Cohen (1932–2016), was born into a Belarusian Jewish family in London and grew up in the Welsh town of Pontypridd. Baron Cohen's paternal grandfather, Morris Moses Cohen, added "Baron" to his surname. His maternal grandmother, Liesel (née Levi), lived in Haifa and trained as a ballet dancer in Germany before fleeing the Nazis in 1936. He has two older brothers: Erran, a composer with whom he often collaborates, and Amnon. His cousins include autism researcher Sir Simon Baron-Cohen, playwright Dan Baron Cohen, and filmmaker Ash Baron-Cohen.

Baron Cohen was educated at the independent Catholic St Columba's College in St Albans, before moving to the independent Haberdashers' Aske's Boys' School in Elstree. He then studied history with a focus on antisemitism at Christ's College, Cambridge. In the summer of 1992, as an undergraduate, he spent several months at the Martin Luther King Jr. Center in Atlanta, researching his dissertation on the role of Jewish activists in the American civil rights movement titled "The Black-Jewish Alliance: A Case of Mistaking Identity". He graduated in 1993 with upper-second-class honours. He was a member of the Cambridge University Amateur Dramatic Club, where he performed in shows such as Fiddler on the Roof and Cyrano de Bergerac, and acted in shows with the Labour youth movement Habonim Dror. He played the cello while growing up and made his television debut as a cellist on Fanfare for Young Musicians.

== Career ==
=== Early roles ===
Baron Cohen grew up as a fan of Monty Python, Peter Cook and Not The Nine O'Clock News, but his greatest comedic influence was Peter Sellers, whom he saw as "this incredibly realistic actor, who was also hilarious and who managed to bridge the gap between comedy and satire". Known for portraying a wide range of comic characters using different accents and guises, Sellers was referred to by Baron Cohen as "the most seminal force in shaping [his] early ideas on comedy". After leaving university, Baron Cohen worked for a time as a fashion model. By the early 1990s, he was hosting a weekly programme on Windsor cable television's local broadcasts with Carol Kirkwood, who later became a BBC weather forecaster. In 1995, Channel 4 was planning a replacement for its series The Word, and disseminated an open call for new television presenters. Baron Cohen sent in a tape of himself, which caught the attention of a producer. Baron Cohen hosted Pump TV from 1995 to 1996.

In 1996, Baron Cohen began presenting the youth chat programme F2F for Granada Talk TV and had a small role in an advertisement for McCain Microchips, as a chef in a commercial entitled "Ping Pong".

He took clown training in Paris, at the École Philippe Gaulier, studying under master-clown Philippe Gaulier. Of his former pupil, Gaulier says: "He was a good clown, full of spirit" while Baron Cohen remarks of Gaulier, "Without him, I really do doubt whether I would have had any success in my field". Baron Cohen explained, "Gaulier introduced me to the satirical archetype of the bouffon ... It was the humor of the dispossessed. Whereas clowns were naive idiots, bouffons savagely undermined the people in power. They were doing something important: using biting and at times cruel humor to undermine systemic injustice".

Baron Cohen made his first feature film appearance in the British comedy The Jolly Boys' Last Stand (2000). Also in 2000, he played the part of Super Greg for a series of TV advertisements for Lee Jeans; the advertisements never aired, but the website for Super Greg created an internet sensation.

=== Characters ===
==== Ali G ====
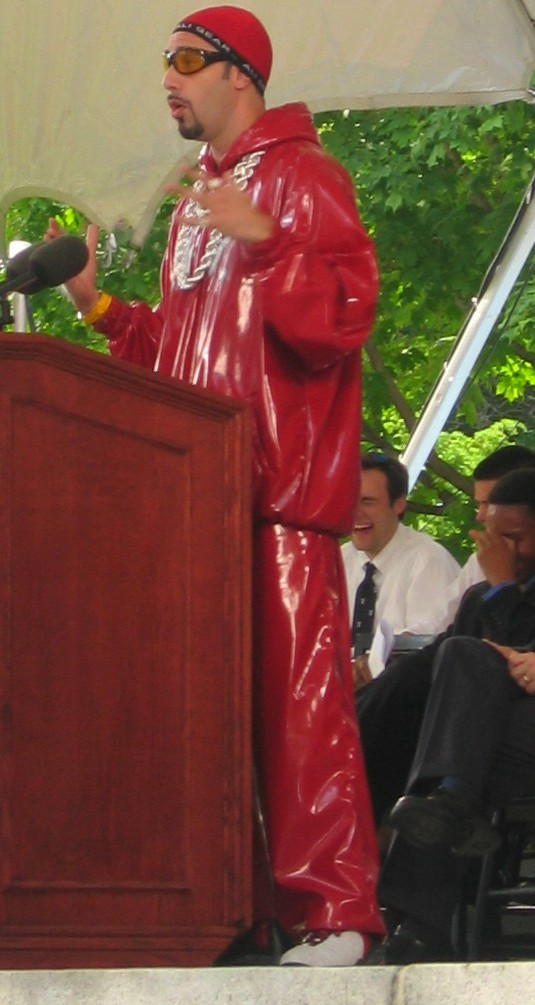
Baron Cohen giving a commencement speech as Ali G at Harvard in 2004

Baron Cohen shot to fame with his comic character Ali G, a fictional stereotype of a white British suburban male "chav" who imitates urban black British hip-hop culture and British Jamaican culture, as well as speaking in rude boy-style English with borrowed expressions from Jamaican Patois. Hailing from Staines, a suburban town in Surrey, to the west of London. Ali G began appearing on the British television show The 11 O'Clock Show on Channel 4, which first aired on 8 September 1998. A year after the première of the show, GQ named Baron Cohen comedian of the year. He won Best Newcomer at the 1999 British Comedy Awards, and at the British Academy Television Awards he was nominated for Best British Entertainment Performance.

Da Ali G Show began in 2000, and won the BAFTA for Best Comedy in the following year. Also in 2000, Baron Cohen as Ali G appeared as the limousine driver in Madonna's 2000 video "Music", directed by Jonas Åkerlund, who was also responsible for directing the titles for Da Ali G Show. Baron Cohen is a supporter of the UK charity telethon Comic Relief, which is broadcast on the BBC, and as Ali G interviewed David Beckham and wife Victoria in 2001.

In a 2001, Channel 4 poll Ali G was ranked eighth on their list of the 100 Greatest TV Characters. In 2002, Ali G was the central character in the feature film Ali G Indahouse, in which he is elected to the British Parliament and foils a plot to bulldoze a community centre in his home town, Staines. His television show was exported to the United States in 2003, with new episodes set there, for HBO.

At the 2012 British Comedy Awards, 13 years after winning Best Newcomer at the 1999 Comedy Awards, Baron Cohen accepted the Outstanding Achievement Award from Sir Ben Kingsley in the guise of Ali G." In 2013, he received the BAFTA Charlie Chaplin Britannia Award for Excellence in Comedy.

Ali G's interviews with notable figures, especially politicians, gained notoriety partly because the subjects were not aware that Ali G, rather than being a real interviewer, was a comedic character. According to Rolling Stone magazine, Baron Cohen would always enter the interview area dressed as Ali G, carrying equipment while acting like an inconspicuous crew member. The crew would be accompanied by a man in a suit and tie, leading the subject to believe that this was the person who would interview them. Baron Cohen, as Ali G, would sit down to ask the interviewee some preliminary questions to give them the impression that this was a test run before the well-dressed man conducted the real interview; this continued until a few moments before the cameras started filming, revealing the suited man as the director and Ali G as the interviewer, granting Baron Cohen the element of surprise as the interviewee would be less likely to opt out of the interview so close to its start.

In July 2026, it was reported that filming had been completed on a new Ali G film; later that week, Baron Cohen attended Wimbledon dressed as the character. Less than a week afterwards, the release date and title of the new film were announced by the actor as his alter ego in an Instagram post. After a one weekend "stunt" launch in cinemas on 23 October 2026, Ali G: Who Iz I? was released on Amazon Prime Video on 28 October 2026 and became the number 1 movie in twelve countries including the United States, United Kingdom, Ireland, Canada and Australia.

==== Borat Sagdiyev ====
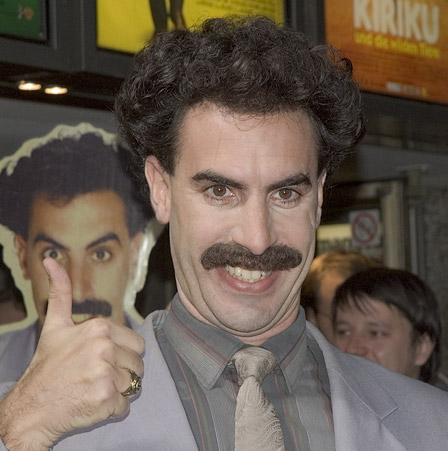
Baron Cohen as Borat in 2006

The Kazakh journalist Borat Sagdiyev was first developed for short skits on F2F on Granada Talk TV in the UK that Baron Cohen presented in 1996–1997, with the character at this time being known as Alexi Krickler. The character remained dormant while Baron Cohen concentrated on his Ali G persona, but with the subsequent success of Ali G, Baron Cohen revisited his Borat character. The character was featured in segments of Da Ali G Show. Borat's sense of humour derives from his mocking of society through outrageous sociocultural viewpoints, his deadpan violation of social taboos and use of vulgar language and behaviour.

Borat: Cultural Learnings of America for Make Benefit Glorious Nation of Kazakhstan, a feature film with Borat Sagdiyev at the centre, was screened at the 2006 Toronto International Film Festival and released in the United Kingdom on 2 November 2006, in the United States on 3 November 2006 and Australia 23 November 2006. The film follows Sagdiyev as he and his colleague Azamat Bagatov travel the US to produce a documentary about life in the country, as all the while Sagdiyev attempts to enter into marriage with celebrity Pamela Anderson. The film is a mockumentary which includes interviews with various Americans that poke fun at American culture, as well as sexism, racism, homophobia, antisemitism and jingoism. It debuted at the No. 1 spot in the US, taking in an estimated $26.4 million in just 837 theatres averaging $31,600 per theatre.

Baron Cohen won the 2007 Golden Globe for Best Actor – Musical or Comedy, his sixth such award. Although Borat was up for "Best Motion Picture – Musical or Comedy", the film lost to Dreamgirls. On 23 January 2007, he was nominated for an Academy Award for Best Adapted Screenplay. He shared his nomination with the film's co-writers, Ant Hines, Peter Baynham, Dan Mazer and Todd Phillips.

Aside from the comic elements of his characters, Baron Cohen's performances are interpreted by some as reflecting uncomfortable truths about his audience. He juxtaposes his own Jewish heritage with the antisemitism of his character Borat.

In 2007, Baron Cohen published a travel guide as Borat, with dual titles: Borat: Touristic Guidings To Minor Nation of U.S. and A. and Borat: Touristic Guidings To Glorious Nation of Kazakhstan. On 21 December 2007, Baron Cohen announced he was retiring the character of Borat. After the release of Borat, Baron Cohen said he would retire Borat and Ali G because the public had become too familiar with the characters. After the release of Brüno, he said he would retire that character.

The character was brought back on a 2018 appearance on Jimmy Kimmel Live and appears in the 2020 sequel Borat Subsequent Moviefilm, for which he won another Golden Globe Award, as well as the 2022 Kennedy Center Honors where he did a standup routine as Borat for the induction of U2.

==== Brüno Gehard ====
Baron Cohen's Brüno character was conceived before the creation of Ali G and Borat. The fashion reporter initially appeared during short sketches filmed during London Fashion Week for the Paramount Comedy Channel in 1996. The flamboyantly gay Austrian fashion show presenter often lures his unwitting subjects into making provocative statements and engaging in embarrassing behaviour, as well as leading them to contradict themselves, often in the same interview. Brüno's main comedic satire pertains to the vacuity and inanity of the fashion and clubbing world. Brüno asks the subjects to answer "yes or no" questions with either "Vassup" (What's up) or "Ich don't think so" (I don't think so); these are occasionally substituted with "Ach, ja!" (Ah yes!) or "Nicht, nicht" ("Nicht" means "not" in German). In one segment on Da Ali G Show, he encouraged his guest to answer questions with either "Keep them in the ghetto" or "Train to Auschwitz".

In May 2009, at the MTV Movie Awards, Baron Cohen appeared as Brüno wearing a white angel costume, a white jockstrap, white go-go boots and white wings and did an aerial stunt where he dropped from a height (using wires) onto Eminem. Baron Cohen landed with his face on Eminem's crotch and with his crotch in Eminem's face, prompting Eminem to leave the venue with fellow rappers D12. Eminem later admitted to staging the stunt with Baron Cohen.

After an intense bidding war that included such Hollywood powerhouses as DreamWorks, Sony, and 20th Century Fox, Universal Pictures won and paid a reported $42.5 million for the film rights to a collection of interviews Baron Cohen performed as the character Brüno. To create these interviews a number of shill companies and websites were created to draw potential interviewees by creating an illusion of legitimacy. The film was released in July 2009.

==== Admiral General Aladeen ====
Baron Cohen's 2012 film, The Dictator, was described by its press as "the heroic story of a dictator who risked his life to ensure that democracy would never come to the country he so lovingly oppressed". Baron Cohen played Admiral General Aladeen, a dictator from a fictional country called the Republic of Wadiya. Borat and Brüno film director Larry Charles directed the film. The main target of the film's satire was Libyan dictator Muammar Gaddafi, who was still alive when the film was written. The producers of the film were concerned it would anger Gaddafi, possibly even resulting in a terrorist attack, so they released deliberate misinformation saying that the film was loosely based on a romance novel written by former Iraqi dictator Saddam Hussein.

On 26 February 2012, Baron Cohen claimed he was banned from attending the 84th Academy Awards in his role as Admiral General Aladeen but the rumour was denied by the Academy, saying "we haven't banned him, he is lying" but made it clear that "Cohen is not welcome to use the red carpet as a platform for a promotional stunt". Baron Cohen eventually appeared at the awards' red carpet with a pair of uniformed female bodyguards, holding an urn which he claimed was filled with the ashes of Kim Jong-il. The "ashes", which Baron Cohen admitted to Howard Stern on the Tuesday, 8 May 2012 episode of The Howard Stern Show were flour, were "accidentally" spilt onto Ryan Seacrest.

=== Who Is America? ===
Baron Cohen portrays various characters in Who Is America?, including Erran Morad, an Israeli anti-terrorism expert. The character is referred to as a colonel (and later captain, general, major, sergeant, brigadier, sergeant corporal and lieutenant) in the Israeli military and a former agent of Mossad (or "not in the Mossad", as he often interjects). Before Who Is America? aired on Showtime, some conservative public figures made statements saying that Baron Cohen had deceived them while in character. Hours before the premiere, Showtime uploaded the "Kinderguardians" segment on their YouTube channel, in which Morad explains to Philip Van Cleave, the president of the Virginia Citizens Defense League, of the proposal of a new program where children ages 3 to 16 are armed with guns. He also interviews other conservatives, such as Dana Rohrabacher, Joe Wilson, and Joe Walsh, who are openly supportive. Only Matt Gaetz expresses skepticism of Morad's proposal and declines to be in his video.

In the second episode, Morad teaches Jason Spencer, a Republican state representative from Georgia, how to detect and repel terrorists by taking pictures up a woman's burqa with a selfie stick, walking backwards while baring his buttocks, and yelling racial epithets. After the airing of the episode, Spencer initially refused to step down, stating that he was exploited by the producers. In May 2018, Spencer lost his primary to a political novice, Steven Sainz, but was expected to serve the rest of his term until November. He eventually did step down on 31 July 2018, leaving the seat vacant.

Baron Cohen has denied Who is America? will return for a second season, noting the publicity surrounding the show and his interviews would make it harder for him to dupe guests. Two characters from the series, Dr. Nira Cain-N'Degeocello & Erran Morad, returned in Baron Cohen's 2026 movie Ali G: Who Iz I?.

=== Other work ===
Baron Cohen guest-starred in the fifth season of Curb Your Enthusiasm, with Dustin Hoffman, as a guide to Heaven. He also provided the voice of the ring-tailed lemur king, King Julien, in DreamWorks Animation's film series, Madagascar, and appeared as Will Ferrell's arch rival, the French Formula One speed demon Jean Girard, in the hit Talladega Nights: The Ballad of Ricky Bobby (2006). He also appeared alongside Johnny Depp in the film Sweeney Todd: The Demon Barber of Fleet Street (2007) as Signor Adolfo Pirelli, co-starred in Martin Scorsese's adventure film Hugo (2011), and portrayed Thénardier in the 2012 film version of the musical Les Misérables. He appeared as a BBC News Anchor in Anchorman 2: The Legend Continues (2013).

Baron Cohen has twice presented the MTV Europe Music Awards, first as Ali G on 8 November 2001, in Frankfurt, Germany, and then as Borat on 3 November 2005 in Lisbon, Portugal. Baron Cohen appeared out of character to accept an award at the British Comedy Awards in December 2006. He said at the time that Borat could not make it to the awards as "he's guest of honour at the Holocaust denial conference in Tehran", referring to the International Conference to Review the Global Vision of the Holocaust.

In September 2010, representatives for Baron Cohen confirmed that he was set to play Freddie Mercury in the Bohemian Rhapsody biopic about the rock singer. He dropped out of the project in July 2013, citing "creative differences" between him and the surviving members of Queen. Queen guitarist Brian May later said that even though the band and Baron Cohen were on good terms, they felt that his presence would be "distracting". The role was later played by Rami Malek. In 2010, Baron Cohen guest-starred in The Simpsons episode, "The Greatest Story Ever D'ohed", as Jakob, a quick-tempered Israeli tour guide.

In 2012, Baron Cohen and his production company Four By Two Films signed a first-look deal with Paramount Pictures, and the deal was renewed in 2014 for three years and a two-film commitment. In Baron Cohen's Grimsby (2016; The Brothers Grimsby in the US), he plays the football hooligan brother of a British MI6 spy. The film received mixed reviews from critics and was a failure at the box office.

Baron Cohen portrayed political activist/anarchist Abbie Hoffman in the drama The Trial of the Chicago 7, with Aaron Sorkin writing and directing. The film was released in September 2020 to positive reviews. For the 93rd Academy Awards, he received an Academy Award nomination for Best Supporting Actor, marking his first Oscar nomination for acting.

Baron Cohen appeared in the Apple TV+ miniseries Disclaimer, which was created, written, and directed by Alfonso Cuarón. The miniseries ran from October to November 2024, where he portrayed the husband of the lead character played by Cate Blanchett. In July 2025, he made a guest appearance in the Disney+ miniseries Ironheart, which is set in the Marvel Cinematic Universe, where he portrayed demonic villain Mephisto. While his appearance was previously announced, his character was kept secret until the series' finale.

He is set to star opposite Keke Palmer in the David O. Russell film Super Toys.

In 2026, Baron Cohen starred alongside Rosamund Pike in Ladies First, a comedy about a male chauvinist who finds himself transported to a matriarchal society. The film became the worldwide number 1 streamed movie on Netflix in its second week of release.

In September 2026, he was cast as Rupert Sebastian Thomas Jr. in Quentin Tarantino's play The Popinjay Cavalier (2027).

== Activism ==
In 2019, Baron Cohen was awarded the Anti-Defamation League's International Leadership Award for opposing bigotry and prejudice. In accepting the award, Baron Cohen gave an impassioned speech directing criticism at internet companies, singling out Facebook, Google, YouTube and Twitter as part of "the biggest propaganda machine in history" and claiming that their rules on hate speech meant "they would have let Hitler buy ads".

Baron Cohen is a founder of Stop Hate For Profit, helping establish the campaign group in 2019. Color of Change, NAACP and other civil rights groups subsequently joined the coalition, resulting in a widespread celebrity boycott of Meta platforms and more than 1,100 corporations temporarily withdrawing advertising from Facebook. He is a vocal critic of social media companies, and has spoken publicly against racism, antisemitism, and online hate speech.

In August 2023, Baron Cohen was a speaker alongside Martin Luther King III and Al Sharpton at the 60th anniversary of the March on Washington. He spoke against racism, antisemitism and anti-LGBTQ prejudice, and criticised social media companies for facilitating the spread of hate, calling for legislation to hold the companies accountable for content promoted by their platforms.

=== Philanthropy ===
He has made donations to numerous causes and children's charities in countries including Syria, Lebanon, Sudan, Yemen and Somalia.

On 28 December 2015, Baron Cohen and his then wife, Australian actress Isla Fisher, gave £335,000 ($500,000) to Save the Children as part of a programme to vaccinate children in northern Syria against measles; they gave the same amount to the International Rescue Committee, also aimed at helping Syrian refugees. Baron Cohen has also made donations to support children and families in Somalia during a severe hunger crisis, and funded the building of a maternity hospital in Hodeidah, Yemen.

In 2020, at the start of the COVID-19 pandemic, Baron Cohen and Isla Fisher partnered with Marc Benioff to send a planeload of Personal Protective Equipment (PPE) to National Health Service workers in the UK.

In October 2024, Baron Cohen gave $500,000 to Save the Children and the International Rescue Committee to help support their work tackling a displacement crisis and famine in Sudan, and called for more aid to support the cause.

=== Gaza war ===
In 2023, he was one of the actors to sign an open letter to President Biden calling for the release of all hostages taken by Hamas.

In October 2023, Baron Cohen was among the members of the Writers Guild of America who criticized the guild leaders for not condemning the October 7 Hamas attacks as other guilds had done.

In November 2023, Baron Cohen was among more than a dozen creators and celebrities who challenged TikTok executives on the subject of content moderation and the safety of Jewish users amidst the early stages of the Gaza war.

== Image and reputation ==
=== Public persona ===
For much of the early part of his career, Baron Cohen avoided doing interviews out of character. However, in 2004, he did the talk show circuit, appearing as himself on Late Show with David Letterman, The Opie and Anthony Show, The Howard Stern Show, and others to promote the forthcoming season of his show on HBO. He was also interviewed on NPR's All Things Considered and did an interview with Rolling Stone, published in November 2006, that the magazine labelled as "his only interview as himself". He also appeared in an interview out of character with Terry Gross on NPR's Fresh Air on 4 January 2007.

Borat director Larry Charles explains that Baron Cohen generally appears in character partly to "protect his weakness", by focusing public interest on his characters rather than himself. His other reason, Newsweek claims, is that Baron Cohen is fiercely private: "...according to the UK press, his publicists denied that he attended a party for the London premiere of Borat and that a party even occurred".

Baron Cohen was featured in the Time 100 list for 2007.

Sports Illustrated's 6 November 2006 issue contains a column called "Skater vs. Instigator", which illustrates various amusing "parallels" between Baron Cohen and figure skater Sasha Cohen, ranging from their mutually held personal significance of the number 4 to their shared romantic interests in redheads.

In 2018, The Times named him among the 30 best living comedians.

=== Controversies, criticisms and lawsuits ===
Baron Cohen has been criticised for the racist or prejudiced comments his characters have made. HBO spokesman Quentin Schaffer replied to the criticism and said, "Through his alter-egos, [Baron Cohen] delivers an obvious satire that exposes people's ignorance and prejudice in much the same way All in the Family did years ago." Regarding his portrayal as the anti-Semitic Borat, Baron Cohen says the segments are a "dramatic demonstration of how racism feeds on dumb conformity, as much as rabid bigotry" rather than a display of racism by Baron Cohen himself. He said, "Borat essentially works as a tool. By himself being anti-Semitic, he lets people lower their guard and expose their own prejudice." Addressing the same topic in an NPR interview with Robert Siegel, he said, "People really let down their guard with [Borat] because they're in a room with somebody who seems to have these outrageous opinions. They sometimes feel much more relaxed about letting their own outrageous, politically incorrect, prejudiced opinions come out." Baron Cohen said he also wishes in particular to expose the role of indifference in the Holocaust: "When I was in university, there was this major historian of the Third Reich, Ian Kershaw, who said, 'The path to Auschwitz was paved with indifference.' I know it's not very funny being a comedian talking about the Holocaust, but it's an interesting idea that not everyone in Germany had to be a raving anti-Semite. They just had to be apathetic." Regarding the enthusiastic response to his song "In My Country There Is Problem" (also known as "Throw the Jew Down the Well"), he said, "Did it reveal that [the cheering audience] were anti-Semitic? Perhaps. But maybe it just revealed that they were indifferent to anti-Semitism."

In an interview with former Tory MP politician Neil Hamilton in 2000, Ali G offered Hamilton what was allegedly cannabis, which Hamilton accepted and smoked, creating some minor controversy in the British media.

Residents of Glod, the Romanian village where the opening scene of Borat was filmed, attempted to sue the film's producers asserting that the film's intent was not properly explained to them. The villagers of Glod were paid the equivalent of four U.S. dollars a day each for their appearances and were told the film would be a documentary about the hardships of rural village life.

The government of Kazakhstan threatened Baron Cohen with legal action following the 2005 MTV Europe Music Awards ceremony in Lisbon, and the authority in charge of the country's country-code top-level domain name removed the website that he had created for his character Borat (previously: http://www.borat.kz) for alleged violation of the law—specifically, registering for the domain under a false name. The New York Times, among others, has reported that Baron Cohen (in character as Borat) replied: "I'd like to state that I have no connection with Mr. Cohen and fully support my government decision to sue this Jew". He was, however, defended by Dariga Nazarbayeva, a politician and the daughter of Kazakhstan's then-President Nursultan Nazarbayev, who stated, "We should not be afraid of humour and we shouldn't try to control everything...". The deputy foreign minister of Kazakhstan later invited Baron Cohen to visit the country, stating that he could learn that "women drive cars, wine is made of grapes, and Jews are free to go to synagogues". After the success of the Borat film, the Kazakh government, including the president, altered their stance on Baron Cohen's parody, tacitly recognising the valuable press coverage the controversy created for their country.

At the 2006 MTV Movie Awards, Borat introduced Gnarls Barkley's performance of "Crazy", where he made a comment about Jessica Simpson, saying that he liked her mouth and that he could see it clearly through her denim pants.

At the 2006 UK premiere of Borat at Leicester Square. he arrived in a cart pulled by a mule and a number of "Kazakh women", announcing: "Good evening, gentleman and prostitutes. After this, I stay in a hotel in King's Cross. We will all drink, wrestle with no clothes on and shoot dogs from the window".

Two of the three University of South Carolina students who appear in Borat sued the filmmakers, alleging that they were duped into signing release forms while drunk and that false promises were made that the footage was for a documentary that would never be screened in the US. On 11 December 2006, a Los Angeles judge denied the pair a restraining order to remove them from the film. The lawsuit was dismissed in February 2007.

On 26 September 2008, Baron Cohen walked onto the catwalk during the Ágatha Ruiz de la Prada fashion show in Milan. In-character as Brüno, he was wearing a costume made of velcro. He appeared on the stage with a blanket and items of clothing stuck to his velcro suit. Lights were turned off while security intervened and escorted him off the stage and the fashion show resumed normally shortly thereafter. Baron Cohen and his team had allegedly accessed the fashion show using fake IDs.

During the filming of Brüno, Baron Cohen was chased through Jerusalem by an angry, rock-throwing Jewish mob. He had outraged Hasidic Jews in the city by dressing in a camp version of their traditional clothing. He escaped the incident by hiding in a shop. The scene was cut from the film.

On 22 May 2009, a charity worker at a seniors' bingo game sued Baron Cohen, claiming an incident shot for Brüno at a charity bingo tournament left her disabled. However, the worker later retracted her statement, saying the "actor never struck her", but that he "beat her down emotionally to the point she's now confined to a wheelchair". The scene did not make the final cut for the film. The case was dismissed in late November 2009 on anti-SLAPP grounds, with all lawyers' fees to be paid by the charity worker. The dismissal was appealed and upheld on 12 September 2011.

On 30 April 2010 Ayman Abu Aita, an Arab from the West Bank featured in the film Brüno filed a lawsuit against Baron Cohen. Abu Aita, a former member of the Al-Aqsa Martyrs' Brigades and Fatah party secretary for Beit Sahour, denied association with the Brigades in the lawsuit and claimed defamation. Aita included David Letterman in the suit based on comments made during a 7 July 2009 appearance by Baron Cohen on the Late Show with David Letterman in which he claimed that Abu Aita was a terrorist. There is currently no proof whether Aita was a terrorist or not.

Despite reported past links with the Brigades, Abu Aita claimed he was a non-violent activist and a board member of Holy Land Trust, a non-profit. Al-Aqsa Martyrs' Brigades, the military wing of Fatah, issued their own response stating the movie "was part of a conspiracy against the al-Aqsa Martyrs Brigade... This was a dirty use of our brother Ayman." Unlike others who sued Baron Cohen, Aita did not sign a release form, and his case centred on whether Baron Cohen's portrayal of Aita was false, not whether he was defrauded. The case was initially dismissed, as Abu Aita was not an American citizen. In September 2012, the defamation claim was settled out of court for an undisclosed amount.

In 2018, former Senate candidate Roy Moore of Alabama sued Baron Cohen for $95 million relating to a mock interview in Who Is America? and allegations of paedophilia. On 13 July 2021, the U.S. District Court for the Southern District of New York dismissed the lawsuit after finding that Moore had signed a consent agreement barring his claims. Moore has filed notice of his intent to appeal the decision. On 8 July 2022, Baron Cohen defeated the lawsuit.

In June 2020, Baron Cohen crashed the right-wing "March for Our Rights 3" protest in Olympia, Washington, a counter-protest to the March for Our Lives demonstration as a result of the Stoneman Douglas High School shooting. Disguised under heavy make-up, Baron Cohen sang a song telling listeners to attack liberals, CNN, the World Health Organization, Barack Obama, Hillary Clinton, Anthony Fauci, Bill Gates and "mask-wearers". The crowd, which initially sang along, realized they were being pranked when counter-protestors recognized Baron Cohen and began laughing. Baron Cohen's security stopped the organizers from taking him off stage and turning off the power, and Baron Cohen was forced to flee in a private ambulance from the crowd. The incident was later revealed to have been organized as part of filming for Borat Subsequent Moviefilm, with Baron Cohen in-character as Borat in disguise.

== Personal life ==
Baron Cohen met Australian actress Isla Fisher at a party in Sydney in 2001 and they became engaged in 2004. She later converted to Judaism, and they were married in a Jewish ceremony on 15 March 2010 in Milan and Paris. They have two daughters (born 2007 and 2010) and a son (born 2015). They divided their time between the Marylebone district of London and the Laurel Canyon neighbourhood of Los Angeles, before settling in Sydney. On 5 April 2024, they jointly revealed that they had filed for divorce at the end of 2023. On 13 June 2025, both Baron Cohen and Fisher announced that they had finalised their divorce, while stating that they remain friends.

Baron Cohen has said of his Jewish identity, "I wouldn't say I am a religious Jew. I am proud of my Jewish identity and there are certain things I do and customs I keep." He tries to keep kosher, attends synagogue about twice a year, and is fluent in Hebrew. He first acted in theatrical productions with the Labour Zionist youth movement Habonim Dror. A 2002 profile reported that Baron Cohen regularly returned to his parents' home for Friday-night Shabbat dinners, sometimes bringing guests.

== Performances and works ==
=== Film ===
Year	Title	Role	Notes
1995	Jack and Jeremy's Police 4	Execution Victim	Television film
1996	Punch	Unnamed character	Short film
2000	The Jolly Boys' Last Stand	Vinnie	
2002	Ali G Indahouse	Ali G / Borat Sagdiyev	Also writer and executive producer
2003	Spyz	Ali G / James Bond	Short film; Also writer and executive producer
2005	Madagascar	King Julien XIII	Voice
2006	Talladega Nights: The Ballad of Ricky Bobby	Jean Girard	
2006	Borat	Borat Sagdiyev	Also writer and producer
2007	Sweeney Todd: The Demon Barber of Fleet Street	Signor Adolfo Pirelli	
2008	Madagascar: Escape 2 Africa	King Julien XIII	Voice
2009	Brüno	Brüno Gehard	Also writer and producer
2010	Dinner for Schmucks	—N/a	Executive producer
2011	Hugo	Inspector Gustav Dasté	
2012	The Dictator	Admiral General / Prime Minister Haffaz Aladeen / Allison Burgers and his double Efawadh	Also writer and producer
2012	Madagascar 3: Europe's Most Wanted	King Julien XIII	Voice
2012	Les Misérables	M. Thénardier	
2013	Anchorman 2: The Legend Continues	BBC News Reporter	Cameo
2016	Grimsby	Kyle Allen "Nobby" Butcher	Also writer and producer
2016	Trouble Agent	Kyle Allen "Nobby" Butcher	
2016	Alice Through the Looking Glass	Time	
2016	Past Forward	The Man with No Mouth	Short film
2020	The Trial of the Chicago 7	Abbie Hoffman	Also associate producer
2020	Borat Subsequent Moviefilm	Borat Sagdiyev	Also writer and producer and 2nd unit director
2021	Luca	Uncle Ugo	Voice
2026	Balls Up	Pavio Curto Bundchen	
2026	Ladies First	Damien Sachs	
2026	Ali G: Who Iz I?	Ali G	Also director, producer, and writer

=== Television ===
Year	Title	Role	Notes
1995	Pump TV	Himself (presenter)	
1996–1997	F2F	Himself (presenter)	
1998	Comedy Nation	Various roles	9 episodes
1998	Live from the Lighthouse	Ali G	Television special
1998–1999	The 11 O'Clock Show	Ali G	45 episodes; also writer
2000–2004	Da Ali G Show	Ali G / Borat Sagdiyev / Brüno Gehard	18 episodes; also creator, writer, and executive producer
2004	Borat's Television Programme	Borat Sagdiyev / Brüno Gehard	2 episodes; also creator
2005	Curb Your Enthusiasm	Larry's guide	Episode: "The End"
2006	Night of Too Many Stars	Borat Sagdiyev	Television special
2010	The Simpsons	Jakob (voice)	Episode: "The Greatest Story Ever D'ohed"
2013	Eastbound and Down	Ronnie Thelman	Episode: "Chapter 29"
2015	Highston	—N/a	Executive producer
2018	The Zen Diaries of Garry Shandling	Himself	Television documentary
2018	Seth Rogen's Hilarity for Charity	Himself	Television special
2018	Who Is America?	Various characters	7 episodes; also creator, writer, director, and executive producer
2019	The Spy	Eli Cohen	6 episodes; also executive producer
2024	Disclaimer	Robert Ravenscroft	7 episodes; miniseries
2025	Ironheart	Mephisto	Episode: "The Past Is the Past"

=== Theatre ===
Year	Title	Role	Playwright/Director	Venue
2027	The Popinjay Cavalier	Rupert Sebastian Thomas Jr.	Quentin Tarantino	Phoenix Theatre, West End

=== Music videos ===
Year	Title	Role	Artist
2000	"Music"	Ali G	Madonna
2002	"Me Julie"	Ali G	Shaggy

== See also ==
- List of British actors
- List of British comedians
- List of Academy Award winners and nominees from Great Britain
- List of European Academy Award winners and nominees
- List of Jewish Academy Award winners and nominees
- List of actors with Academy Award nominations
- List of Golden Globe winners

Media offices
Preceded by Wyclef Jean; Xzibit	MTV Europe Music Awards host 2001 (as Ali G); 2005 (as Borat)	Succeeded by Sean Combs; Justin Timberlake
