= F2F (TV series) =

Television series

- Genre: Youth Talk; Comedy
- Presented by: Natasha Kaplinsky; Sacha Baron Cohen
- Country of origin: United Kingdom
- Original language: English

Original release
- Network: Granada Talk TV
- Release: October 1996 – August 1997

F2F was a short lived youth chat show series which aired on the British television channel Granada Talk TV. It featured phone ins, studio guests and comedy sketches within interstitials. The series ran between October 1996 and August 1997, when the channel was officially closed. It was presented by both Sacha Baron Cohen and Natasha Kaplinsky in their first major roles on television.
