= The 11 O'Clock Show =

- Genre: Satire; Comedy
- Presented by: Brendon Burns (series 1); Fred MacAulay (series 1); Iain Lee (series 1–4); Daisy Donovan (series 2–4); Mackenzie Crook (series 2); Jon Holmes (series 5); Sarah Alexander (series 5)
- Country of origin: United Kingdom
- Original language: English
- No. of series: 5
- No. of episodes: 144

Production
- Running time: 30–35 minutes
- Production company: Talkback

Original release
- Network: Channel 4
- Release: 30 September 1998 – 8 December 2000

Related
- Da Ali G Show

The 11 O'Clock Show is a satirical late-night British television comedy series on Channel 4 that features topical sketches and commentary on news items. It ran between 30 September 1998 and 8 December 2000, most notably hosted by Iain Lee and Daisy Donovan. The show boosted the careers of the previously little-known Ricky Gervais, Sacha Baron Cohen (in character as Ali G), Jimmy Carr, and Mackenzie Crook.

== Hosts and presenters ==
The 11 O'Clock Show underwent a number of line-up changes during its run. There are numerous cases of external-segment reporters becoming studio hosts, and vice versa. Notable presenters and cast members included:

- Iain Lee
- Simon Greenall (in character as Vim Van Der Laan)
- Daisy Donovan (for Series 1 in character as Pandora Box-Grainger)
- Mackenzie Crook
- Paul Garner
- Sacha Baron Cohen (in character as Ali G)
- Ricky Gervais
- Fred MacAulay
- Brendon Burns
- Sarah Alexander
- Jon Holmes
- Rich Hall
- Alex Lowe
- Will Smith
- Tommy Vance
- Ricky Grover
- Danny Bhoy
- Marc Wootton
- Jason Priestley
- Jimmy Carr

== Production ==
The 11 O'Clock Show was commissioned by Kevin Lygo who'd recently taken the role of Head of Entertainment at Channel 4. The new Chief Executive, Michael Jackson, wanted a new nightly topical sketch show. The commission was not put out to competitive tender, instead it was given to Peter Finchem's Talkback Productions who had previously produced Brass Eye for the channel.

Harry Thompson produced the new show, he had previously produced The News Quiz on Radio 4 and developed its transformation for television to create Have I Got News For You, as well as launching successful new formats such as Never Mind The Buzzcocks, The Mary Whitehouse Experience and They Think It's All Over.

During development Graham Norton was asked to host the show, but he declined saying he disliked news.

The series launched with Brendan Burns and Fred MacAulay hosting with Iain Lee as the 'roving reporter'. Rich Hall presented a report from the USA in front of the White House, Iain Lee prank called into the previous night's BBC election broadcast with Mo Mowlam, Daisy Donovan made her first appearance in the guise of Pandora Box-Grainger attending a Steve Coogan premiere, and Ali G also first appeared.

The show was broadcast three nights a week. The first series had a two week run, its second series ran for six weeks and the third series had a three month commission.

The 11 O'Clock Show was mostly written, recorded and transmitted on the same day. However the Ali G segments were an exception and were pre-recorded in isolation from the main production. By the third series the show's goal was described internally as to be like a "newspaper on telly, with jokes."

James Bobin was a director and writer and helped create the characters of Ali G, Borat and Brüno.

"Ali G was the thing that kept the 11 O'Clock Show going. If we hadn't have had Ali G, the 11 O'Clock Show would have died." - Iain Lee

Mackenzie Crook joined the show in Series 2.

Ricky Gervais (54 episodes) joined The 11 O’Clock Show team for Series 3 replacing Sacha Baron Cohen (45 episodes).

Writers during the 5 series run of the show included Ben Caudell, Peter Holmes, Shaun Pye, Charlie Skelton, Robin Ince & Charlie Brooker.

"the show had been given the specific instruction, unbeknownst to me, to shock. Shock and offend was more important than being funny... The Ali G stuff was hilarious, the Ricky Gervais stuff was divisive but hilarious. But a lot of it wasn't very funny." - Iain Lee

Sarah Alexander joined the show in Series 5.

== Controversy ==
In January 2000, the show came under criticism from the Broadcasting Standards Commission following viewer complaints about comments made on the show about recently deceased TV presenter Jill Dando, songwriter Bobby Willis (the husband of entertainer Cilla Black) and golfer Payne Stewart.

In January 2000, the Independent Television Commission upheld complaints from viewers for sketches about the 1999 Armenian parliament shooting.
