= Granada Talk TV =

British speciality television channel

Ownership
- Owner: Granada Sky Broadcasting (ITV Granada and British Sky Broadcasting joint venture)

History
- Launched: 1 October 1996
- Closed: 31 August 1997 (10 months and 30 days)

Granada Talk TV was a short-lived TV channel owned and operated by Granada Sky Broadcasting, a joint venture between BSkyB and Granada Television. It launched on 1 October 1996 with the other channels of the bouquet, but due to low viewership the channel ceased broadcasting on 31 August 1997.

The channel is perhaps best known for helping launch the careers of Sacha Baron Cohen (presenter of anarchic children's show F2F), Natasha Kaplinsky (co-presenter of the Paul Ross Show) and Graham Norton (regular guest presenter on F2F). At the time of preparation, the channel employed LWT's team of journalists.

It also bred some of British television's most successful production talent, including Layla Sabih (later commissioning editor at the ITV Network), Mark Cowley (the creative force behind the 'Bush Tucker Trials' on ITV's I'm a Celebrity...Get Me Out of Here!) and Rob Burley (later editor of the Jonathan Dimbleby programme and the driving force behind ITV's Sunday political output).

Channel controller Will Smith became head of Granada London's Factual department, best known for the hit series Airline.

It closed on 31 August 1997 and the final day's broadcasts were a simulcast of Sky News so that it could provide coverage of the death of Diana, Princess of Wales.
