= 2020 VCDL Lobby Day =

2020 gun rights rally in Richmond, Virginia

VCDL Lobby Day
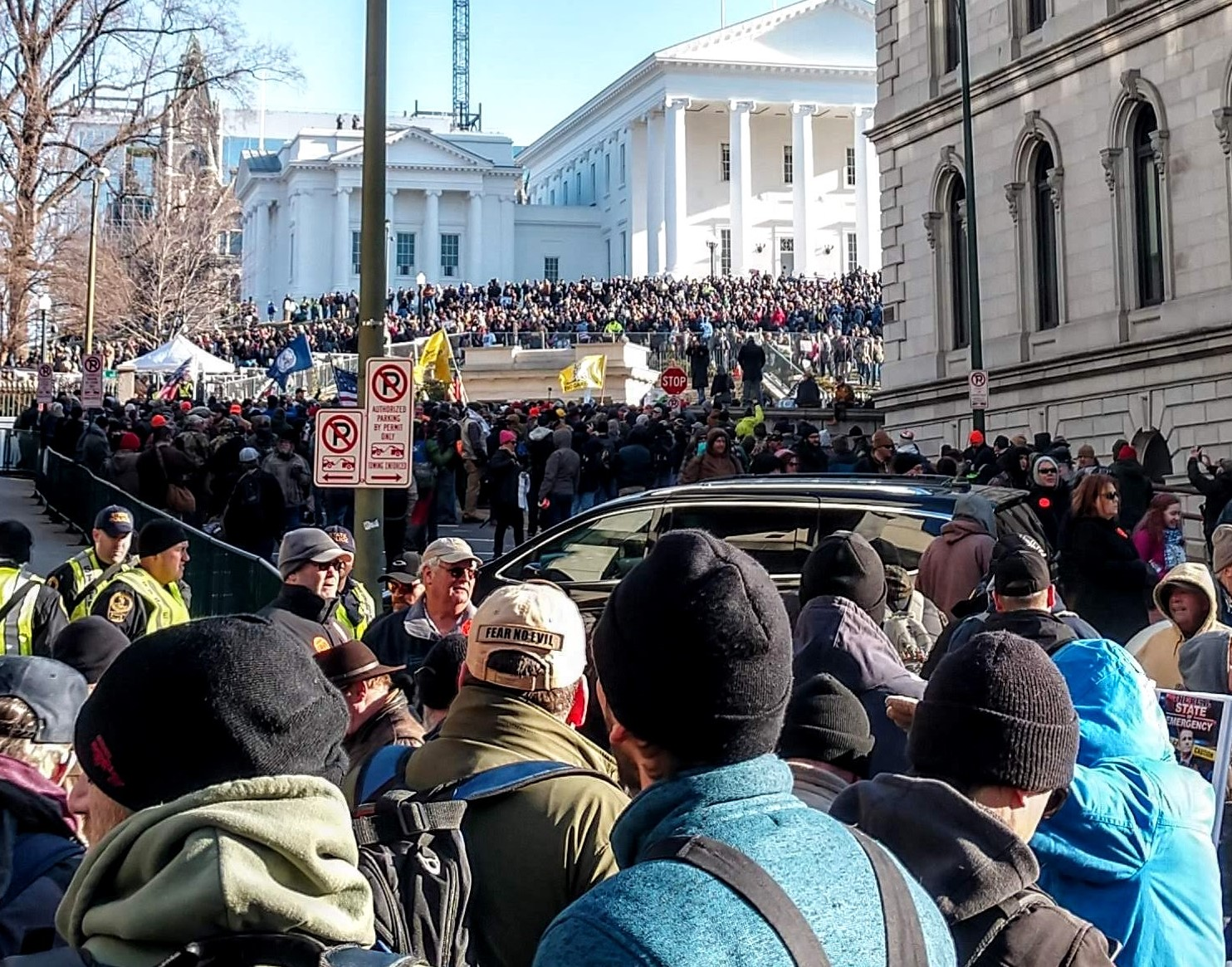
- Lobbyists at VCDL's 2020 Lobby Day in Richmond, Virginia
- Date: January 20, 2020
- Location: Virginia State Capitol, Richmond, Virginia; 37.539918°N 77.432436°W
- Organized by: Virginia Citizens Defense League

The Lobby Day 2020 was a gun rights rally that took place on January 20, 2020, at the Virginia State Capitol in Richmond, Virginia. The rally was an extension of the Second Amendment sanctuary movement and was organized by the Virginia Citizens Defense League. Fears of violence from neo-Nazis prompted Virginia governor Ralph Northam to declare a state of emergency ahead of the event, although the event concluded peacefully with no reports of violence.

== Background ==
Virginia's Lobby Day is an annual event, held each year on MLK Day and created by the Virginia Citizens Defense League. The annual rally began about 17 years ago. The 2020 rally received international attention and a greater turnout than previous years because a Democratic majority in both the Virginia House of Delegates and state Senate was elected in 2019, alongside incumbent Democratic governor Ralph Northam, along with fears of the passage of pending, stringent gun control legislation. President Donald Trump also acknowledged the event, and stated that the United States Constitution was "under very serious attack" in the Commonwealth of Virginia.

== State of emergency ==
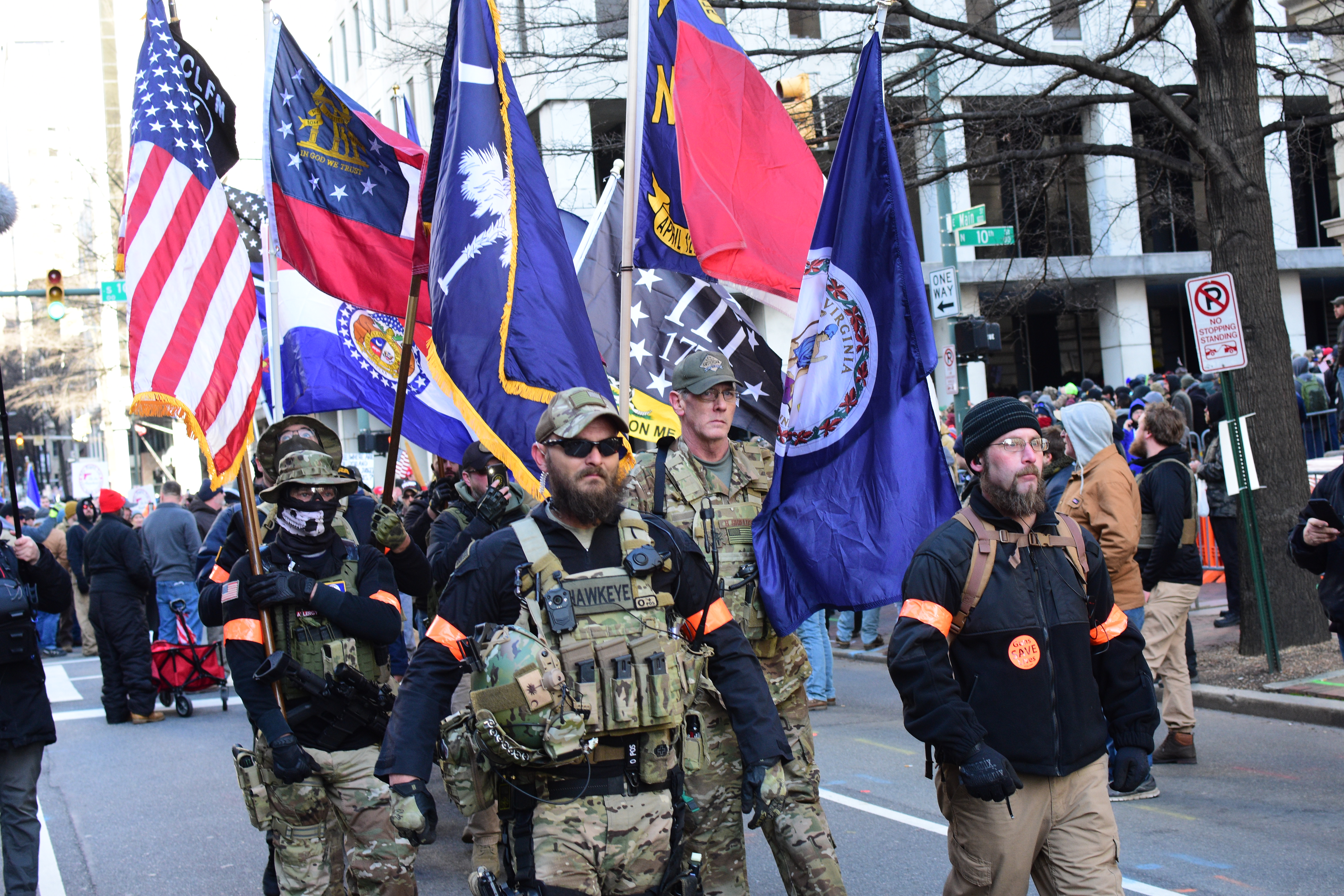
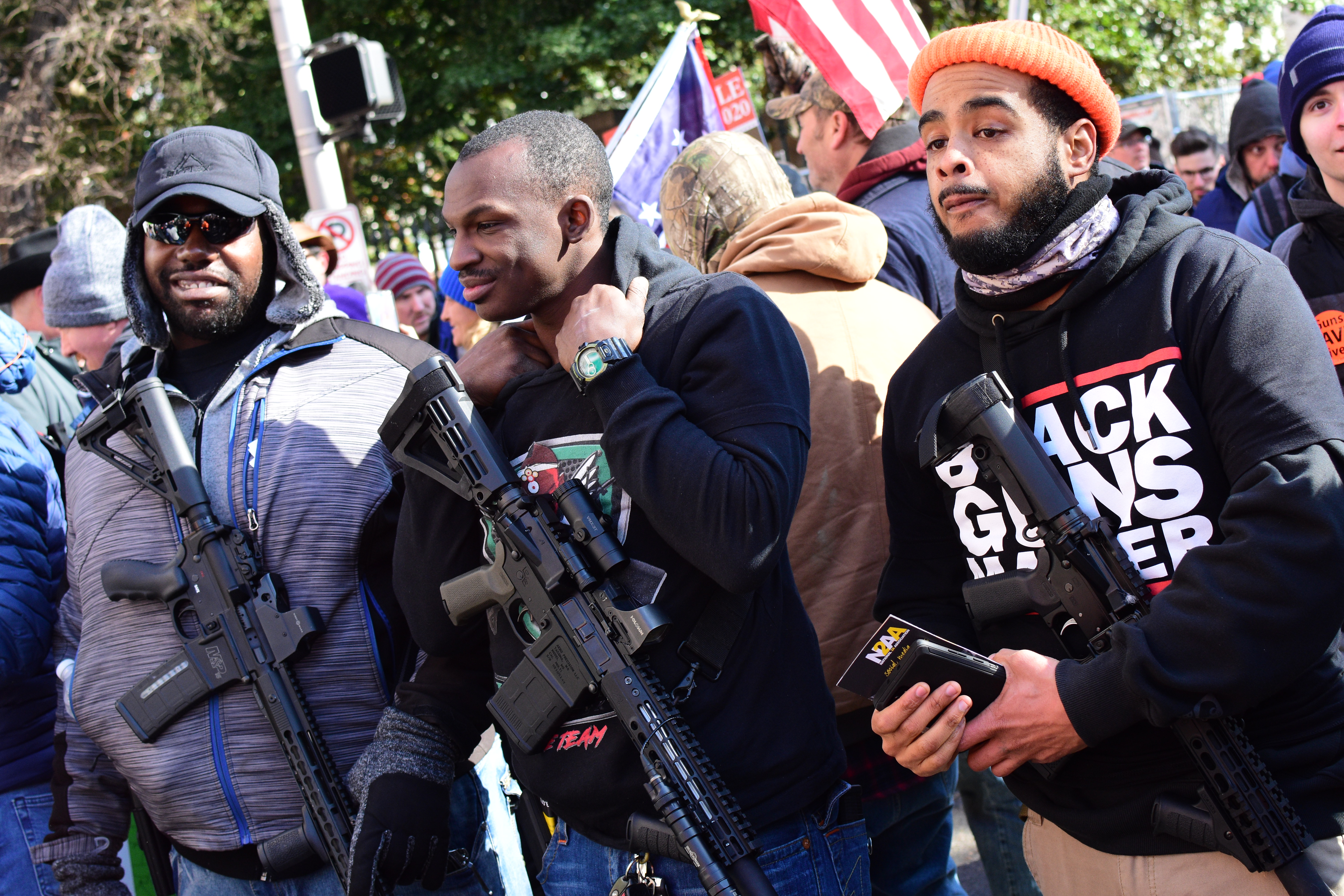
Armed demonstrators at the Lobby Day rally, January 20, 2020

Governor Ralph Northam received advance warning that "out-of-state militia groups and hate groups" were planning to come to the event to "intimidate and to cause harm" to the demonstrators, which led him to declare a state of emergency ahead of the event.

Three members, including two US citizens and one Canadian national, of the neo-Nazi group The Base—of which were hostile to the beliefs of the protesters—were arrested in Maryland by the FBI days before the event and charged with harboring illegal aliens, unlawful possession and interstate transportation of a machine gun with intent to commit a felony, and, for the Canadian national, being an alien in possession of firearms and ammunition. Although initial reporting on the arrest of the three neo-Nazis implied a connection to the VCDL rally, neither press release from the US Attorney's Office for the District of Maryland nor the court documents from the prosecution of the arrested neo-Nazis stated they planned to attend the rally. The group hoped that the rally would kickstart a second civil war, which would culminate with a neo-Nazi coup of the United States Government.

== Demonstration ==
A reported 22,000 people demonstrated, less than half of the number of attendees predicted by the rally's organizers. Speakers at the event included Stephen Willeford, Republican State Senator Amanda Chase, Republican Delegate Nick Freitas, and Republican Delegate John McGuire. The event concluded peacefully.

Members of The Base, a neo-Nazi group, believed that the rally could have been the powder keg needed to ignite their predicted Boogaloo race war, although no violence resulted.
