= George Floyd protests in the San Francisco Bay Area =

2020 civil unrest after the murder of George Floyd

- Part of George Floyd protests in California
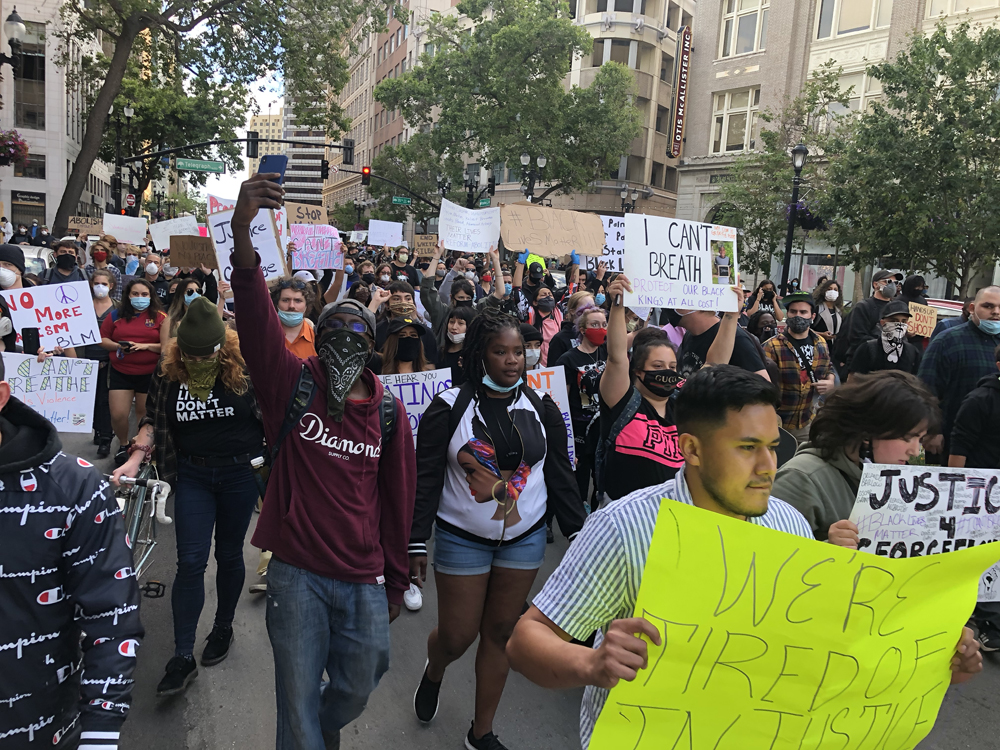
- Protest in Oakland on May 29
- Date: May 28 – September 27, 2020 (3 months, 4 weeks and 2 days)
- Location: San Francisco Bay Area, California, United States
- Caused by: Police brutality; Institutional racism against African Americans; Reaction to the murder of George Floyd and killing of Breonna Taylor; Economic, racial and social inequality

Casualties
- Deaths: 2

This is a list of protests that took place in the San Francisco Bay Area following the murder of George Floyd on May 25, 2020, in Minneapolis, Minnesota, while in police custody.

== Locations ==
=== Antioch ===
A group of protesters demonstrated outside Antioch City Hall on June 29, calling for the removal of two officers, one of whom shot a homeless man in San Francisco.

=== Berkeley ===
About 3,000-4,000 protesters marched in South Berkeley, on June 6.

=== Castro Valley ===
On June 1, protesters gathered at the intersection of Redwood Road and a driveway leading to an office of the California Highway Patrol. The demonstrators were loud, but there was no violence, vandalism, or looting.

=== Clayton ===
On June 2, 200–300 protesters marched from Concord to downtown Clayton, where they were met by police.

=== Cloverdale ===
Protests were held at Cloverdale Plaza on May 31.

=== Concord ===
On June 2, 200–300 protesters marched from Concord to downtown Clayton, where they were met by police.

=== Fremont ===
On June 2, hundreds marched several miles from Newark to the Fremont Police Department.

=== Marin City ===
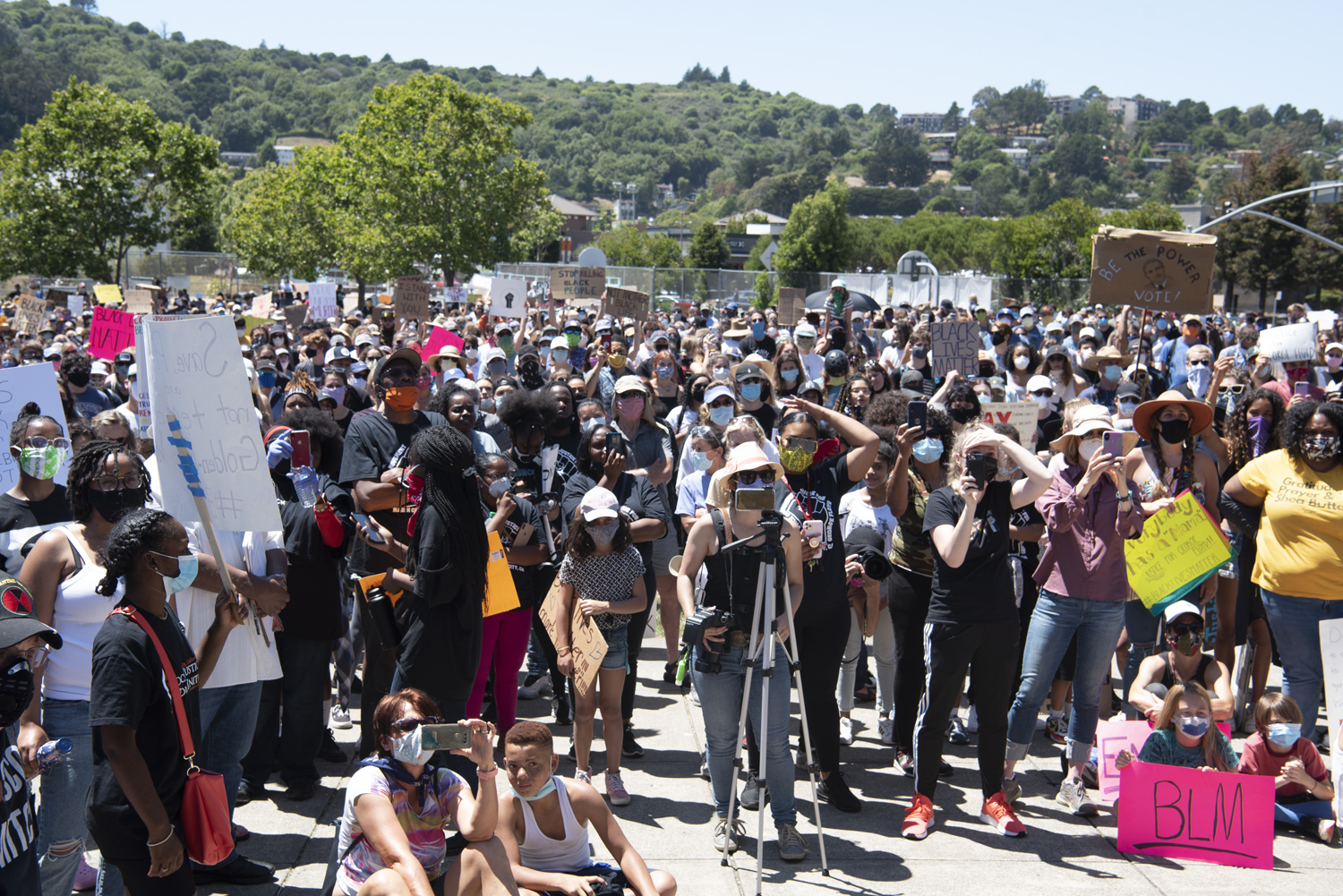
Protest in Marin City on June 2

On June 2, protesters marched from downtown Ross to Marin City.

=== Menlo Park and Palo Alto ===
Hundreds of protesters, including high school students, marched through Menlo Park, Palo Alto and East Palo Alto on June 1. In the morning, people knelt on the lawn for nine minutes at Burgess Park and listened to speakers including Menlo Park's first African-American female mayor before marching to El Camino Park. Picketers blocked lanes on US Route 101 and the Oregon Expressway. Fireworks hit a patrol car but the officer was not injured. About 150 demonstrators marched to Mark Zuckerberg's home and stayed briefly.

=== Mountain View ===
On June 4, at Mountain View, a large crowd gathered at the intersection of San Antonio Road and El Camino Real the night of June 4 to protest police violence. The protest, which shut down El Camino Real while protesters marched to the Mountain View City Hall, was organized by several seniors at Los Altos High School with civics teacher Seth Donnelly.

=== Napa ===
On May 31, about 300 protesters gathered at Napa County Courthouse and Veterans Memorial Park. A previously scheduled protest in Napa was cancelled due to unfounded reports of outside groups threatening to disrupt the rally.

=== Newark ===
On June 2, hundreds marched several miles from Newark to the Fremont Police Department.

=== Oakland ===
On May 29, hundreds of protesters gathered near the Oakland Police Department headquarters in downtown Oakland. Some protesters set off fireworks and threw bottles at police. Police fired flash-bang grenades and tear gas at the crowd. Many businesses in the area were ransacked or had their windows smashed. Several dozen protesters blocked traffic on Interstate 880, stopping traffic in both directions for about half an hour. Oakland police department reported arrests but did not provide any specific details. Six police officers and seven civilians were injured in clashes.

On July 25, initially peaceful protests in solidarity with Portland, Oregon against the deployment of federal agents there turned violent and saw the Oakland Police Department headquarters vandalized and the Alameda County courthouse set on fire. According to police, an estimated 700 people attended the overnight protest, with some demonstrators shooting fireworks, breaking windows, spraying graffiti, pointing lasers at officers and helicopters, chanting racial slurs at residents, and setting "multiple small fires in the downtown area". Several arrests were made.

=== Petaluma ===
About 300 people marched from downtown Petaluma to the Sonoma-Marin County Fairgrounds in Petaluma on May 31.

=== Pleasanton ===
On June 5, in Pleasanton, more than 2,000 demonstrated in a march that started at Amador Valley Community park and included an 8-minute and 46 seconds moment of silence in remembrance of the time George Floyd spent being murdered by Derek Chauvin.

=== Redwood City ===
On June 2, about 2,000 demonstrated in front of the old San Mateo County Courthouse in Redwood City. Police arrested seven men with guns who said they were trying to defend their property.

=== Ross ===
On June 2, protesters marched from downtown Ross to Marin City.

=== San Francisco ===
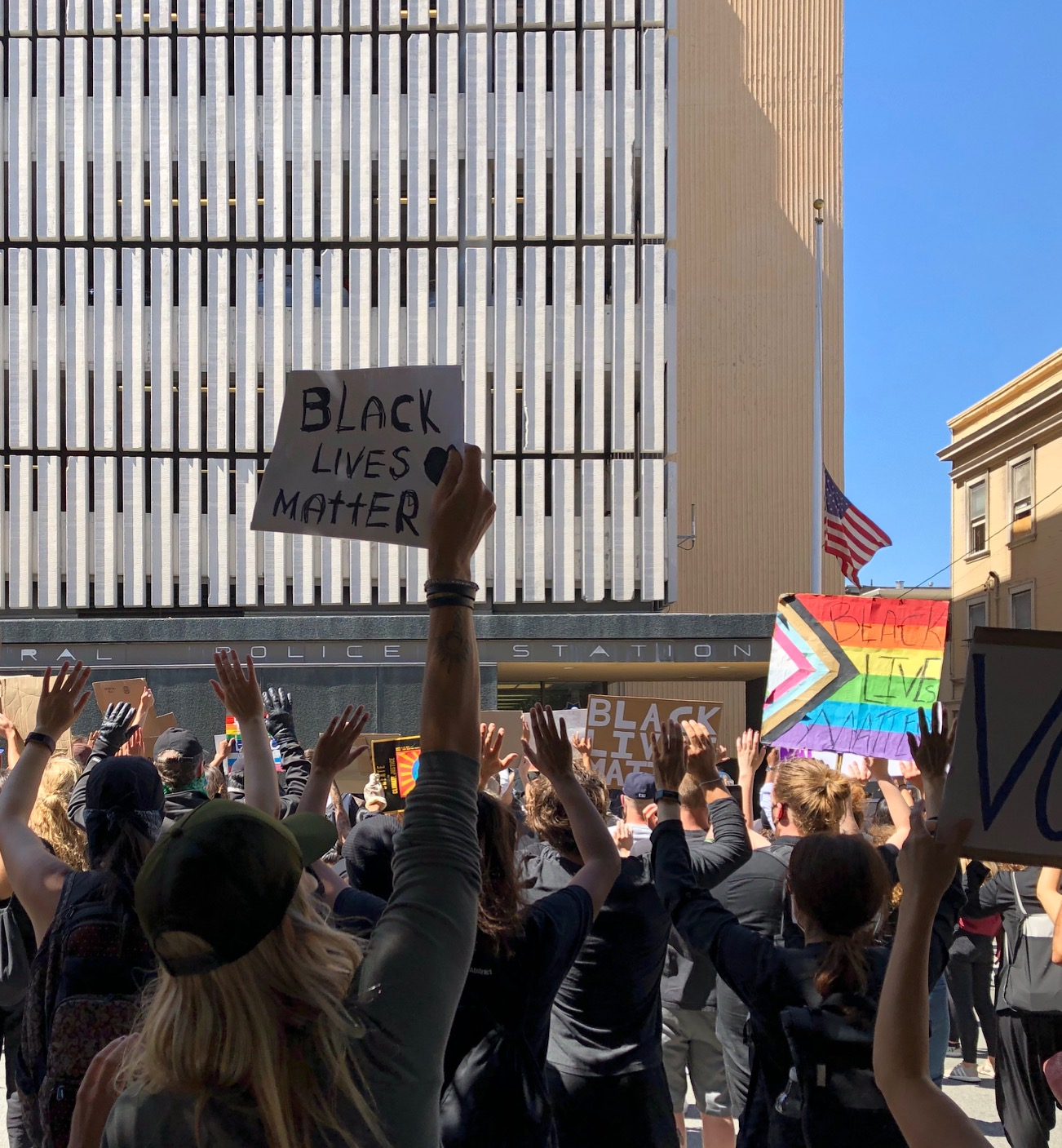
Protest against police brutality outside North Beach police station, San Francisco on June 7

On May 30, a protest was held at UN Plaza in the afternoon. Later that night, looting occurred at Union Square stores and ten arrests on felony looting were made. San Francisco Mayor London Breed issued a curfew.

On June 3, a protest of an estimated 12,000 to 16,000 people was organized at Dolores Park. On June 6, a protest on the Golden Gate Bridge drew thousands of attendees.

On June 11, Nurses for Racial Justice organized a march for health-care workers from CPMC Van Ness Campus to San Francisco City Hall at 7:45pm. Another march to San Francisco Police Headquarters occurred earlier in the day. A third group of skateboarders protested at a rally called Bomb Hills 4 Black Lives at Justin Herman Plaza.

On June 18, city officials removed a statue of Christopher Columbus in San Francisco's Pioneer Park (near Coit Tower) after calls had been made on social media to throw the statue into the San Francisco Bay.

On June 19, demonstrators in Golden Gate Park toppled or otherwise vandalized statues of Catholic missionary Junipero Serra, Francis Scott Key (author of the lyrics to The Star-Spangled Banner), Ulysses S. Grant, author Miguel de Cervantes and his fictional characters Don Quixote and Sancho Panza. The archbishop of San Francisco, Salvatore Cordileone, described the toppling of the saint's statue as "an act of sacrilege [and] an act of the Evil One", and on June 27 performed an exorcism at the site using the Prayer to Saint Michael.

=== San Jose ===
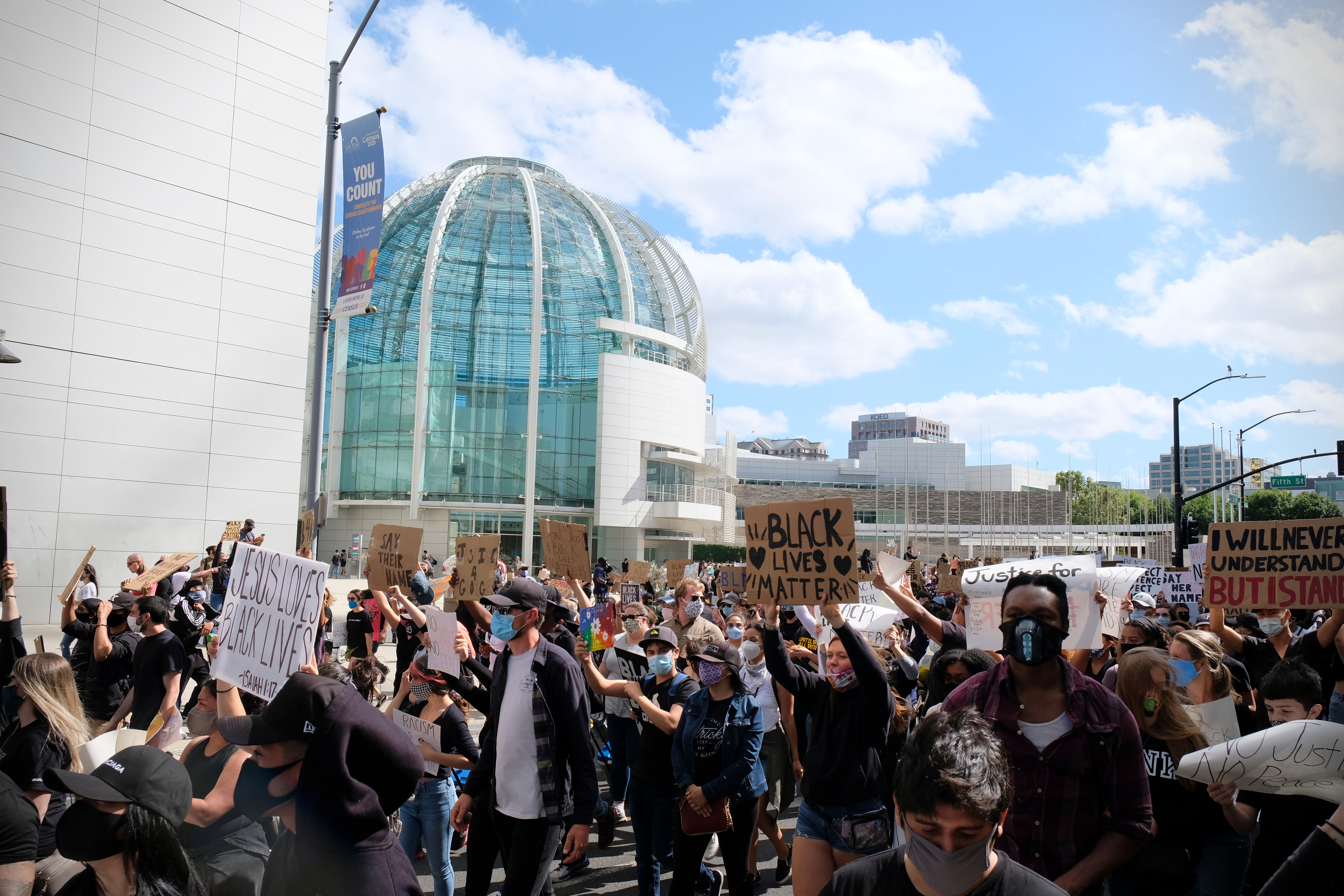
Protest in San Jose on June 7

On May 29, hundreds of protesters blocked traffic on Highway 101, then marched to City Hall. At Highway 101, some people in the group were seen attacking vehicles. One man was filmed smashing a car's window while a woman pulled on the doors and yelled at the occupants to get out. Protesters also blocked Interstate 880. Some threw bottles and rocks and launched firecrackers at police, injuring some officers. Many businesses and properties had their windows smashed and were ransacked. Some rioters also used graffiti to vandalize. One crowd started a fire on Broadway and fed it with debris and construction barricades.

San Jose Police Department officer Jared Yuen drew national attention for aggressive behavior towards protesters, including insulting protesters, then nearly immediately firing projectiles which initiated a fight. A San Jose resident, who was seen in a viral video assisting police by carrying an officer, alleged that not long after on May 29, officer Jared Yuen shot him without cause, with a rubber bullet. A cultural bias trainer for the San Jose police was shot in the groin by a San Jose police officer, causing a testicle to rupture. Officer Jared Yuen was among the group of officers who had fired on the trainer, but it was unclear if Yuen himself had fired. The city imposed a curfew from 20:30 to 05:00, beginning on May 31.

=== San Mateo ===
A peaceful protest led by high school students attracted hundreds of participants took place on June 3 in San Mateo. Protesters gathered at City Hall, then walked down El Camino Real to a San Mateo police station.

=== San Rafael ===
Protesters lined up along Third Street in the North Bay on May 31 in San Rafael. Passing drivers honked in encouragement.

=== San Ramon ===
On June 3, hundreds of protesters marched from Valley View Park to San Ramon City Hall.

=== Santa Clara ===
On June 5, a crowd of about 200 protesters gathered at Santa Clara City Hall. They held a two-minute moment of silence for Breonna Taylor.

=== Santa Rosa ===
On May 30, up to 500 protesters marched from downtown Santa Rosa to Mendocino Avenue, towards the Sonoma County Jail. Later that night, downtown restaurants, banks, church, and the Santa Rosa Plaza had windows smashed and graffiti mentioning Andy Lopez, a 13-year-old killed by police in Santa Rosa in 2013.

On May 31, a 33-year-old man was injured in the lower face from a stingball grenade that was fired from an officer. The protester was struck as he was kneeling in the middle of a street near the Sonoma County Sheriff's Department and Jail buildings, one hour after officers had given protesters orders to disperse. A woman had been struck over the left eye with a projectile the day prior in Santa Rosa.

A total of 75 people were arrested in relation to additional protests and unrest on June 2. A 17-year-old boy was arrested for assault with a deadly weapon a week after allegedly trying to run over protesters with a pickup truck near Old Courthouse Square, and accelerating towards Fourth Street. One site reported that multiple protesters were injured, but none were reported to be major or required medical attention.

=== Sebastopol ===
There were about 200 protesters in downtown Sebastopol on June 3.

=== Sonoma ===
On May 30, more than 100 protesters gathered in Sonoma Plaza, marched around town and laid face down with their hands behind their backs in front of Sonoma City Hall to protest the murder of George Floyd.

=== Sunnyvale ===
On June 5, several thousand peaceful protesters gathered in downtown Sunnyvale and walked to Sunnyvale City Hall where several speakers, including Mayor Larry Klein, gave speeches in support of Black Lives Matter.

=== Vacaville ===
On June 1, hundreds of protesters gathered at Vacaville City Hall.

=== Vallejo ===
In Vallejo, about 100 protesters marched from Wilson Park to the Vallejo Police Department station on May 28 and on September 27.

=== Walnut Creek ===
On Sunday, May 30, groups of looters indiscriminately looted and vandalized many businesses in Walnut Creek and other East Bay communities, separate from peaceful demonstrations earlier in the day. A young woman in Walnut Creek's Broadway Plaza was shot in the arm. An 8 p.m to 5 a.m curfew was implemented shortly after.

On June 1, a few hundred protesters attempting to walk onto I-680 in Walnut Creek were almost immediately met with tear gas, rubber bullets, and dogs.

== Deaths ==
On May 30, amidst the unrest in Oakland, a Federal Protective Service officer, David Patrick Underwood, was fatally shot outside a federal courthouse in a drive-by attack that also wounded another guard. Underwood had been providing security at the courthouse during a protest. The Department of Homeland Security labeled the shooting an act of domestic terrorism. Boogaloo movement member Steven Carrillo was charged with the murder on June 16. He was also implicated in the murder of a Santa Cruz County deputy.

On June 2 in Vallejo, 22-year-old Sean Monterrosa was shot five times and killed by a police officer while on his knees with his hands up. When Monterrosa lifted his hands, a 15-inch hammer tucked in his pocket was revealed, which was mistaken for a handgun. The officer involved, who was not named but was identified as an 18-year veteran, fired five shots at Monterrosa through the window of the unmarked vehicle he was driving.

On June 6, Erik Salgado was shot and killed by the California Highway Patrol while allegedly driving a Dodge Hellcat looted from a San Leandro dealership several nights beforehand during the George Floyd protests.

== See also ==
- List of George Floyd protests in the United States
- List of George Floyd protests outside the United States
- Racism
