= Who Is America? =

American comedy television series

- Genre: Political satire
- Created by: Sacha Baron Cohen
- Starring: Sacha Baron Cohen
- Opening theme: "Indomitable" by DJ Shub
- Composer: Erran Baron Cohen
- Country of origin: United States
- Original language: English
- No. of seasons: 1
- No. of episodes: 7

Production
- Executive producers: Sacha Baron Cohen; Anthony Hines; Todd Schulman; Andrew Newman; Dan Mazer; Adam Lowitt
- Producers: Melanie J. Elin; Nicholas Hatton; Daniel Gray Longino; Dan Swimer; Tim Allsop; Debra Neil-Fisher
- Cinematography: Luke Geissbühler; Matthew W. Davis
- Editors: Vera Drew; Eric Notarnicola; Roger Nygard; Mark Davies
- Running time: 24–28 minutes
- Production companies: Four By Two Television; Spelthorne Community Television; Showtime Networks

Original release
- Network: Showtime
- Release: July 15 – August 26, 2018

Who Is America? is an American political satire mockumentary-style television series created by Sacha Baron Cohen that premiered on July 15, 2018, on Showtime. Baron Cohen also stars in the series as various characters and executive produces alongside Anthony Hines, Todd Schulman, Andrew Newman, Dan Mazer, and Adam Lowitt.

== Premise ==
Who Is America? explores "the diverse individuals, from the infamous to the unknown across the political and cultural spectrum, who populate our unique nation".

== Cast and characters ==
Sacha Baron Cohen portrays the following characters:

- Billy Wayne Ruddick Jr., PhD, a far-right conspiracy theorist and self-proclaimed citizen journalist who publishes his investigations on his website TRUTHBRARY.org
- Dr. Nira Cain-N'Degeocello, a liberal lecturer on gender studies at Reed College, co-principal at Wildfields Poly-Ed, and a Democratic activist who wishes to "heal the divide" in America between conservatives and liberals. He has a partner named Naomi, a son named Harvey Milk and a daughter named Malala.
- Rick Sherman, a recently released British ex-convict who used his limited resources in prison to create art, music, and culinary dishes. His artistic medium is bodily fluids and excrement, his club music is made up of sounds he recorded while incarcerated, and his cooking is similarly prison-themed. Sherman attempts to share his work with prominent people in his given field of choice in hopes of promoting his creations to a wider audience.
- Erran Morad, an Israeli anti-terrorism expert, member of the Israeli military, and former agent of Mossad (or "not in the Mossad", as he often interjects). He demonstrates the use of unconventional tactics and technology in the fight against such enemies as terrorists, immigrants, and pedophiles. For example, he showcased a recent instrument that can detect a pedophile. He believes that the National Rifle Association's plan for arming school teachers does not go far enough to curtail gun violence and proposes a new program, "Kinderguardians", where children ages 3 to 16 are armed with guns embedded inside toy animals called "Gunimals". His military rank changes with each episode. He also worked in the army as a seducer for at least 3 years.
- Gio Monaldo, an Italian billionaire playboy and fashion photographer from Milan with his own television series on Italian network Canale 5 titled La Vita Diamante di Gio. His charitable causes include the West African Ebola virus epidemic and child soldiers.
- OMGWhizzBoyOMG!, a Finnish YouTuber with an unboxing show in which he interviews guests while opening new collectible toys. Despite his childish and goofy presentation, he frequently makes comments suggesting his support for fascism.

== Episodes ==
No.	Title	Directed by	Written by	Original release date	U.S. viewers (millions)
1	"101"	Sacha Baron Cohen, Payman Benz, Daniel Gray Longino, Dan Mazer & Todd Schulman	Sacha Baron Cohen, Anthony Hines, Dan Swimer, Dan Mazer, Lee Kern, Adam Lowitt, Brian Reich, Kurt Metzger, Eric Notarnicola & Aaron Geary	July 15, 2018	0.327
Billy Wayne Ruddick Jr., PhD interviews Senator Bernie Sanders.; Dr. Nira Cain-N'Degeocello interviews Jane Page Thompson, a South Carolina Republican delegate who cast her vote for Donald Trump during the 2016 Republican National Convention, and her husband Mark.; Rick Sherman sits down with Christy, a fine art consultant in Laguna Beach, California, and attempts to convince her to sell his artwork.; Erran Morad sits down with various conservatives including Philip Van Cleave, gun rights advocate and the president of the Virginia Citizens Defense League, Larry Pratt, executive director emeritus for the lobbying group Gun Owners of America, Matt Gaetz, the former U.S. Representative for Florida's 1st congressional district, and Trent Lott, the former U.S. Senate Majority Leader from Mississippi, in order to convince them to support his proposal of arming children ages 3 to 16 in order to prevent school shootings. Morad produces a video featuring the aforementioned people he talked to, in addition to Dana Rohrabacher, Joe Wilson, and Joe Walsh. Each openly advocates for his proposal, with the exception of Gaetz.
2	"102"	Sacha Baron Cohen, Nathan Fielder, Daniel Gray Longino & Dan Mazer	Sacha Baron Cohen, Anthony Hines, Dan Swimer, Dan Mazer, Lee Kern, Nathan Fielder, Adam Lowitt, Brian Reich, Kurt Metzger, Eric Notarnicola & Aaron Geary	July 22, 2018	0.161
Erran Morad teaches Jason Spencer, a Republican state representative from Georgia, how to detect and repel terrorists. This includes taking pictures up a woman's burqa with a selfie stick, walking backwards while baring his buttocks, and yelling racial epithets.; Gio Monaldo travels to Los Angeles to have Corinne Olympios endorse his charity that helps those infected with ebola in Africa. Olympios agrees to being photoshopped into a photo of aid workers and appearing on camera claiming that she had been in Africa personally helping with relief efforts. She also appears on camera endorsing a program to help fund the training of child soldiers.; Billy Wayne Ruddick Jr., PhD engages in a debate with Ted Koppel over the difference in attendance between the inauguration of President Obama and that of President Trump.; Morad interviews former U.S. Vice-President Dick Cheney who agrees to autograph Morad's waterboarding kit.; Dr. Nira Cain-N'Degeocello travels to Kingman, Arizona, where he gives a presentation to a town hall meeting of local people. He informs them of a potential financial investment in their community through the construction of the world's largest mosque outside of the Middle East.
3	"103"	Paymen Benz & Daniel Gray Longino	Sacha Baron Cohen, Anthony Hines, Dan Swimer, Dan Mazer, Lee Kern, Adam Lowitt, Brian Reich, Kurt Metzger, Eric Notarnicola & Aaron Geary	July 29, 2018	0.218
Erran Morad interviews former Alabama judge and Republican U.S. senate candidate Roy Moore and demonstrates a new device invented by the Israeli Army to detect pedophiles. Moore leaves the interview after the device detects Moore as a sex offender.; Dr. Nira Cain-N'Degeocello brings former South Carolina state legislator Chip Limehouse and rap artist Bone Crusher together for a discussion. Cain-N'Degeocello makes many claims, including that it is offensive to refer to African Americans as black, that Will Smith is a gangsta rapper from Compton, California, and that having enjoyed anal sex with a man does not make him a homosexual – all of which his guests openly disagree with or dispute.; Morad teaches a Trump supporter and two others how to lure and trap illegal aliens from Mexico. Together, Morad and two of the men carry out a mission where they put on a mock Quinceañera designed to attract Mexican men interested in young women. The mission is interrupted when two police officers arrive suspecting the men of attempting to lure underage girls.; Cain-N'Degeocello engages in a rap battle in an inner city area of Atlanta, Georgia.
4	"104"	Nathan Fielder, Daniel Gray Longino & Dan Mazer	Sacha Baron Cohen, Anthony Hines, Dan Swimer, Dan Mazer, Lee Kern, Adam Lowitt, Brian Reich, Kurt Metzger, Eric Notarnicola & Matt Lucas	August 5, 2018	0.313
Erran Morad teaches Trump supporter and Republican businessman Shaun McCutcheon, and his employee Zan, how to defend an office from terrorists, using pork and a picture of two men apparently having anal sex.; Dr. Nira Cain-N'Degeocello discusses pornography with David Pyne, a director of the Utah Republican Assembly. He goes on to read to Pyne from a children's book that is designed to teach young people about sex and masturbation.; Gio Monaldo meets with a yacht broker from a luxury yacht sales company. They discuss purchasing a yacht for Syrian president Bashar al-Assad in order to attack escaping Syrian refugees and to carry out human trafficking. While the men are talking, Monaldo's assistant gives him a handjob and a blowjob.; OMGWhizzBoyOMG! discusses gun control with former Maricopa County, Arizona sheriff Joe Arpaio while they unbox Shopkins.
5	"105"	Daniel Gray Longino, Dan Mazer & Todd Schulman	Sacha Baron Cohen, Anthony Hines, Dan Swimer, Dan Mazer, Lee Kern, Matt Lucas, Aaron Geary, Adam Lowitt, Kurt Metzger, Brian Reich & Eric Notarnicola	August 12, 2018	0.269
Rick Sherman goes to the Heart Nightclub in Miami, Florida and meets with nightclub promoter/DJ manager Jake Inphamous to discuss electronic dance music that Sherman has created while in prison. Two days later, Inphamous reaches back out to Sherman, now using the stage name DJ Solitary, and takes him to the SWAY Nightclub in Fort Lauderdale, Florida to debut his music.; Billy Wayne Ruddick Jr., PhD interviews former Trump campaign manager Corey Lewandowski. They discuss the president's stance on racial issues, Ruddick explains some of his conspiracy theories, and the president's attitudes towards women are explored.; Gio Monaldo conducts a photoshoot with internet entrepreneur Mahbod Moghadam, one of the founders of Genius. Moghadam agrees to be photoshopped into pictures appearing to be feeding starving African children.; OMGWhizzBoyOMG! discusses Antifa with Milwaukee County sheriff David Clarke while they unbox Shopkins.; Erran Morad meets with Youth Shooters of America founder Dan Roberts and teaches him how to survive terrorist attacks. His demonstrations include speaking at a high volume, throwing babies into trash cans to neutralize suicide bomber infants, and halting a beheading by biting an attacker on the penis, using a strap-on dildo to illustrate the technique.
6	"106"	Dan Mazer & Todd Schulman	Sacha Baron Cohen, Anthony Hines, Dan Swimer, Dan Mazer, Lee Kern, Adam Lowitt, Matt Lucas, Aaron Geary, Brian Reich, Kurt Metzger & Eric Notarnicola	August 19, 2018	0.246
Billy Wayne Ruddick Jr., PhD interviews former presidential candidate Jill Stein and discusses climate change and global warming. He then interviews former Governor of Vermont Howard Dean and discusses his theory that Hillary Clinton is secretly a man.; Erran Morad teaches reality personality Gretchen Rossi and her husband Slade Smiley how to protect themselves from home invasion.; Dr. Nira Cain-N'Degeocello travels to the Las Vegas Enlightenment Center and meets with spiritual healer Ataana Badilli. Cain-N'Degeocello discusses his plan to "give birth" to a baby doll from his rectum as a means empathizing with his partner whom he recently impregnated.; Ruddick interviews the Director of the National Institutes of Health Dr. Francis Collins and discusses his theory that agrochemical practices have turned people transgender. He also discusses his theory that AIDS is a myth and explains his experiment involving sharing a needle with an HIV-positive homeless man.; In preparation of opening his own restaurant, Rick Sherman serves a three course meal to food critic Bill Jilla featuring prison-inspired cuisine, with one dish purportedly including the flesh of a Chinese dissident.; In a mid-credits segment, OMGWhizzBoyOMG! discusses gun control with former Governor of Arizona Jan Brewer while they unbox Shopkins.
7	"107"	Daniel Gray Longino & Dan Mazer	Sacha Baron Cohen, Anthony Hines, Dan Swimer, Dan Mazer, Lee Kern, Adam Lowitt, Brian Reich, Kurt Metzger & Eric Notarnicola	August 26, 2018	0.249
Billy Wayne Ruddick Jr., PhD interviews former congressman Barney Frank and discusses the veracity of the Donald Trump Access Hollywood tape and the pizzagate conspiracy theory, until Frank walks out.; Erran Morad trains three conservative men how to infiltrate Antifa. His methods include using knowledge of the television series Girls to gain the confidence of liberals, complimenting liberal men, learning information about lesbians, and insulting Donald Trump. Morad takes one of the men on a mission to a women's march in San Francisco where they are supposedly attempting to stop a liberal plan to develop diapers that turn babies transgender. The two of them pretend to be lesbians while walking around meeting various people at the march and tag certain ones with tracking devices. Morad has the man press a button on a tablet computer which supposedly kills one of the people they have tagged.; In a mid-credits segment, Gio Monaldo meets with O. J. Simpson in a hotel room in Las Vegas where he attempts to remind his girlfriend of who Simpson is. After she leaves the room, Monaldo jokes with Simpson about killing her.

== Production ==
=== Development ===
Although Baron Cohen's career began with his prank interviews on Da Ali G Show, he found that his increased fame from Borat and Brüno made it more difficult to continue without being recognized. Following the release of Brüno in 2009, Baron Cohen reached out to visual effects artist Rick Baker to ask if it was viable for him to wear realistic prosthetics to continue duping interviewees, only to learn the technology was not advanced enough at the time. Baron Cohen revisited the idea of continuing his prank interviews after the 2016 election: he wished to channel his anger at the election of Donald Trump by returning to his old style of comedy and interviewing the people within Trump's circle. Subsequently, he reached out to Baker's protégé Tony Gardner, who worked on Johnny Knoxville's prosthetics for the 2013 hidden camera prank film Jackass Presents: Bad Grandpa. Gardner served as the head of the makeup effects department for the show.

On June 29, and July 3, 2018, Showtime released two short videos promoting a series set to premiere on July 15, 2018. The videos claimed that the network could not yet reveal the title of the series, its premise, or who it was that created it due to a non-disclosure agreement. Over the following days, early speculation among various news sources pinpointed comedian Kathy Griffin as being the possible star of the new series. On July 5, 2018, following the release of a mysterious video from Sacha Baron Cohen on his Twitter account the previous day, it began to be reported that the series would actually star Baron Cohen and that it would resemble his previous series Da Ali G Show.

On July 9, 2018, it was announced that Showtime had given the production a series order for a first season consisting of seven episodes and that it was set to premiere on July 15, 2018. The series was created by Baron Cohen who was also set to executive produce alongside Anthony Hines, Todd Schulman, Andrew Newman, Dan Mazer, and Adam Lowitt. On August 26, 2018, Baron Cohen suggested in a tweet from his official Twitter account that the show would not return for a second season. The following day, Showtime confirmed that the series had ended. However, on the subsequent day further reports indicated that Showtime had not formally canceled the series and still maintained a desire to produce more. By December 19, 2018, Baron Cohen was again reiterating in multiple interviews that the series would not return for a second season citing the loss of the element of surprise and inability to dupe potential guests following all of the press the series had received since it premiered. However, those same articles noted that Showtime had yet to formally end the series.

=== Filming ===
To gauge how strong Baron Cohen's disguises would need to be, a test interview was shot in February 2017 at the Warrior One Guns & Ammo gun shop in Riverside, California. For this interview Baron Cohen simply wore a beard, hat and glasses for his disguise. The store owner was reportedly told by the show's crew that they were filming a documentary about a Hungarian immigrant wanting to buy a gun. However, when Baron Cohen entered the store dressed in character, the store owner immediately recognized him and said, "You're Borat!" After being identified, Baron Cohen walked out the front door. The experience from this interview made Baron Cohen realize he would need much more elaborate prosthetics in order to hide his identity. On August 3, 2017, Baron Cohen was reported to have been filming in Augusta, Georgia, in character as "Dr. Nira Cain" on the local The Austin Rhodes Show.

In February 2018, Baron Cohen reportedly filmed a segment with O. J. Simpson in a hotel room in Las Vegas, Nevada. It was later reported that Baron Cohen's intention in the piece was to elicit a confession from Simpson regarding his alleged involvement in the 1994 murder of Nicole Brown and Ron Goldman and he reportedly paid one of Simpson's lawyers to arrange a meeting. Simpson was told that Baron Cohen, in disguise as his Gio Monaldo character, was a middleman for a sheikh. Simpson was reportedly further told that this sheikh was willing to pay a seven-figure sum to have him explain what happened on the night of the murders but only after first sitting down with Monaldo. The interview was one of a handful of segments filmed with hidden cameras.

Baron Cohen later revealed in an interview with Deadline Hollywood, that the series had almost secured an interview with U.S. Secretary of Housing and Urban Development Ben Carson. Baron Cohen and the crew of the series had been in Washington, D.C. for three weeks filming with various political figures including Bernie Sanders when they approached Carson and his staff with an interview request. Following Carson's agreement to be interviewed, a room at the Mandarin Oriental hotel was booked for filming. Baron Cohen arrived at the hotel room in character as the OMGWhizzBoyOMG character and made it past Carson's Secret Service detail. However upon Baron Cohen's arrival and right as filming was set to begin, a White House press representative became suspicious and proceeded to pull Carson out of the interview. In the same interview, Baron Cohen claimed that, while in-character as Gio during filming at the Las Vegas hotel, he falsely told a concierge that he had molested an eight-year-old boy, to which the concierge reportedly responded by advising Gio on methods of covering up the assault and getting in touch with other children for sexual purposes. According to Baron Cohen, the purpose of the child molestation claim was to investigate how powerful individuals such as Harvey Weinstein are able to thoroughly cover up long histories of sexual misconduct, in light of the ongoing Me Too movement. Baron Cohen claims that the interview footage was cut from the show for being "too unsettling for the audience" and was instead turned over to the Federal Bureau of Investigation, only for the bureau to decline investigating further.

=== Music ===
The series' theme song is "Indomitable" by DJ Shub from his 2016 EP PowWowStep. Shub was reportedly on vacation when his manager contacted him with the information that Sacha Baron Cohen was requesting to license one of his songs. Shub, a fan of Baron Cohen's, immediately gave his approval. He was initially under the impression that the song would be used for an upcoming film and was surprised to hear it used in a promotional trailer for the series. He was later further astonished to discover it was being used as the series official theme music over the opening credits.

== Release ==
=== Marketing ===
On June 29, 2018, a teaser was released by Showtime announcing that a new series was premiering on July 15, 2018, but they could not yet reveal the title of the series or its creator and star. On July 3, 2018, another teaser was released. The following day, Baron Cohen released a video on his Twitter account hinting at an upcoming project featuring Donald Trump. On July 8, 2018, Baron Cohen released another video this time featuring former American vice-president Dick Cheney. The next day, following the series' official announcement, the first full trailer for the series was released. On July 22, 2018, the "waterboard kit" signed by Cheney in the series' second episode was put up for sale on eBay shortly before the episode aired. The auction started at $1 and rose all the way to $2,551 by 5:50 PM PT Sunday evening. The sale was intended to benefit Amnesty International, however by Monday morning eBay had taken the listing down. In a statement, the company explained the item's removal saying, "due to unusual bidding activity and the seller being new to eBay, this listing was removed based on our risk models."

=== Interviewee response ===
On July 10, 2018, former Alaskan governor Sarah Palin disclosed on Facebook that she had been interviewed by Baron Cohen while he was in character as a disabled veteran. She expressed anger at being tricked into participating in the interview saying, "I join a long list of American public personalities who have fallen victim to the evil, exploitive, sick 'humor' of the British 'comedian' Sacha Baron Cohen, enabled and sponsored by CBS/Showtime." Ultimately, Palin's interview was not included in any of the series' seven episodes though in the end credits of the final episode Palin is credited as "Special Publicity Consultant (Inadvertent)". A day later, former U.S. congressman Joe Walsh revealed on Twitter that he too had been interviewed by Baron Cohen in character and was critical of the methods used to gain his participation in filming saying, "Dressing up as a wounded veteran is absolutely stolen valor, his tactics are disgusting—I know cause I too was duped."

On July 12, 2018, former Alabama judge Roy Moore similarly divulged his unwitting participation in the series through a statement saying, "As for Mr. Cohen, whose art is trickery, deception and dishonesty, Alabama does not respect cowards who exhibit such traits!" That same day, Georgia talk radio host Austin Rhodes confirmed he had unwittingly had Baron Cohen on his radio program as a guest in August 2017 while Baron Cohen was in character. Rhodes indicated that he was not as irritated as other interviewees had been, mentioning that he is a fan of Baron Cohen's, and saying his "biggest regret is not being able to shake his hand as Sacha Baron Cohen or interview him (as himself)." Also that same day, former Maricopa County, Arizona sheriff Joe Arpaio revealed that he had been interviewed by Baron Cohen and commented on how he felt "disturbed" after the interview saying, "You can't get any more fake. The guy's posing from the media from Finland? I get a lot of interviews from foreign people. I always talk to the foreign people. This was a little strange." In a fourth report that day, broadcast journalist Ted Koppel disclosed that he had taken part in an interview for the series at his home under the impression it was for an upcoming Showtime series titled Age of Reason. Koppel was not overly irritated at the notion of being tricked saying, "Everybody loves seeing well-known people get duped. I relish it too, when it's done well." Though he went on to express concern over the notion of people posing as documentarians or journalists adding,

I think there's a larger issue here and that is, if there's one thing we don't need any more of in this particular era it's people posing as documentarians. I think there's enough skepticism to go around about people who actually are reporters, who actually are documentarians. And to undermine whatever tiny little bit of confidence might be left by pulling a stunt like this ... maybe it will make for a good comedy show. I don't know. But I don't think it helps the overall atmosphere.

On July 13, 2018, U.S. Representative Matt Gaetz of Florida admitted that he had been deceived by Baron Cohen and participated in an interview. Gaetz acknowledged that he was a fan of Baron Cohen's and was looking forward to the series saying, "It's very consistent with his model, beginning with a seemingly normal interaction and then the brilliance of his comedy is that he accelerates the awkwardness of it to some usually ironically humorous end."

On July 15, 2018, Laguna Beach fine art dealer consultant Christy Cones commented on her appearance in the series' first episode saying, "Sacha Baron Cohen owes me a face-to-face meeting as compensation for his underhanded tactics and his preying on the vulnerable, especially by pretending to be someone who suffered when he probably hasn't suffered a moment in his life. That's the least he could do after putting me through this. That, and buy a painting."

On July 16, 2018, Showtime defended Baron Cohen against the accusations leveled against him and the series by Palin and Walsh regarding his alleged portrayal of himself as a disabled military veteran saying, "Baron Cohen never presented himself as a veteran of the U.S. military to former Alaska Governor Sarah Palin during the booking process or during the filming of her interview, and contrary to her claims he did not appear in a wheelchair. In both the interview with Governor Palin and the interview with Senator Sanders, he did not wear military apparel of any kind."

On July 17, 2018, U.S. Representative Dana Rohrabacher of California issued a statement commenting on his appearance in episode one saying, "I love good satire, but good satire must reveal some basis in truth. This was fraud, a sick fraud at that, and its intention was to deceive the American people for political purposes."

On July 21, 2018, reality star Corinne Olympios discussed in an interview with Entertainment Weekly how she had made peace with her appearance in the series' second episode, saying, "It was a little scary, I'm not going to lie... This is what he does, everyone knows he's a jokester, he's a political jokester. He's funny, he's a very well-known name, and you've just gotta ride with it. Yolo!"

On July 31, 2018, Atlanta battle rapper Ness Lee spoke with Vulture in an interview regarding his appearance in episode three, saying, "I thought he was going to make me look crazy. But I came out looking okay. I don't know the real answer as to why, so I'm just gonna make myself believe that Sacha's actually a fan of mine, and that's why I got a decent edit."

On August 10, 2018, Arpaio spoke again about his appearance on the show, this time in the wake of his segment's airing in episode four, through an interview with The Washington Examiner. In the interview, Arpaio issued a challenge to Baron Cohen saying, "Get the guts, get out of your undercover role, come and interview me in English, of course, so I can understand him so we can go man-to-man. You can ask me anything you want. I'll be glad to deal with it. He won't have the guts to do that. Maybe he will, I don't know."

On August 13, 2018, Youth Shooters of America founder Dan Roberts commented on his appearance in the series' fifth episode during an interview with The New York Times. He expressed his displeasure in the conduct of Baron Cohen and Showtime saying, "This was a malicious, willful and deliberate act on the part of Sacha Baron Cohen, the production company and Showtime, who blatantly lied to me about the purpose of the entire thing, in a deliberate effort to humiliate me."

On September 5, 2018, it was reported that Moore had filed a lawsuit against Baron Cohen, Showtime, and CBS Corporation seeking $95 million in damages for alleged fraud, defamation, and emotional distress. The lawsuit was filed in the United States District Court for the District of Columbia and argues that the release signed by Moore was "obtained through fraud" and was therefore "void and inoperative." On October 23, 2018, it was reported that Showtime had filed a motion for a change of venue from the U.S. District Court in Washington, D.C., to the Southern District of New York, which covers Manhattan. On December 12, 2018, Moore's legal team issued an opposition to a motion by Cohen, Showtime and CBS to have the matter dismissed. In the filing, Moore's legal team contended that he was "fraudulently induced" to appear on the show by two primary misrepresentations. The first was that he was under the impression that he was being flown to Washington D.C. to receive an award for his support of Israel. The second was he was told that the segment he was appearing in was being produced by an Israeli production company named Yerushalayim TV. In July 2021, Southern District of New York Judge John Cronan dismissed the lawsuit, declaring that "Moore's claims are barred by the unambiguous contractual language, which precludes the very causes of action he now brings." This decision was upheld by the Second Circuit Appeals Court in Manhattan, which wrote in its unsigned summary order that "Baron Cohen may have implied (despite his in character disclaimers of any belief that Judge Moore was a pedophile) that he believed Judge Moore's accusers, but he did not imply the existence of any independent factual basis for that belief besides the obviously farcical pedophile detecting 'device,' which no reasonable person could believe to be an actual, functioning piece of technology." Responding to the judgement, Moore told the Associated Press that Baron Cohen's "pusillanimous and fraudulent conduct must be stopped," and that he will be making a further appeal.

=== Political consequences ===
Following the premiere of the series' second episode, Jason Spencer, a Republican state representative from Georgia, faced criticism from members of both sides of the political spectrum after he appeared onscreen screaming the racial epithets "nigger" and "sand nigger", speaking in a stereotypical Asian accent, and baring his buttocks in a purported attempt to ward off potential terrorists. By July 24, 2018, it was announced that Spencer would resign from his office effective July 31, 2018.

=== Distribution ===
On July 15, 2018, the series premiered on CraveTV in Canada and on Stan in Australia. On July 16, 2018, it premiered on Channel 4 in the United Kingdom and on Canal+ in France. On July 17, 2018, it premiered on Sky Atlantic in Germany.

== Reception ==
=== Critical response ===
The series was met with a mixed response from critics. On the review aggregation website Rotten Tomatoes, the series holds a 56% approval rating with an average rating of 6 out of 10 based on 64 reviews. The website's critical consensus reads, "Fleetingly funny and all too relevant, Who Is America? proves Sacha Baron Cohen still has something to say—though its nihilistic approach may not be the right way to say it." Metacritic, which uses a weighted average, assigned the series a score of 59 out of 100 based on 22 critics, indicating "mixed or average reviews".

In a mixed review, The New York Times's Mike Hale called the premiere "tepid and inconsequential" and compared the show to Baron Cohen's previous work saying, "Mr. Cohen remains a strong performer and writer, and while these new characters aren't as ferociously funny as Ali G or Borat, they still have their moments." In an additional ambivalent critique, NPR's Linda Holmes called the first episode "hit-and-miss" praising the Erran Morad character and segment in the first episode but criticizing the other three saying, "In the premiere episode, there were three weak, uninspired pieces and one that was a solid hit. How much you want to watch this show will depend on how you feel about that ratio and how much patience you have for how funny Cohen thinks he is." Offering the series restrained praise, Jen Chaney of Vulture spoke of the series' potential relevance to America's political state at the time of its release saying, "When Who Is America? is on point, as it is in the 'Kill or Be Killed' segment, it doesn't just remind us that some of our emperors have no clothes. It exposes them for walking around naked with no sense of shame whatsoever." In another mixed review, Entertainment Weekly's Darren Franich gave the first episode a grade of "C+" and said, "There are some laughs in Who Is America?, but the most profound feeling you get from the show is weariness. Cohen's haphazard comedy instincts feel topical in the worst way. Some politicians said crazy things on television? That's not strange anymore. It's mandatory." In a more positive review, Sonia Saraiya of Vanity Fair offered the show qualified praise saying, "The Herculean efforts Cohen undergoes in order to entrap, fool, or insult his targets are both a little exhausting and a little pointless—but I can't deny that Who Is America? is funny, too, once you get past the shock and squirming horror."

=== Ratings ===
On television, the premiere episode had 0.1 rating in the demographic of adults 18–49 with a total number of 327,000 viewers tuning in to watch the episode. Streaming and on-demand viewing added another 301,000 viewers to that total, raising the premiere's viewer total up to 628,000. The series was the 70th highest-rated original show on cable the night it premiered. Showtime has reported that the series had over a million viewers on the day it premiered when all of the network's platforms are added together. The network is also reporting that the series fueled the most sign-ups in 2018 for a series in a single day for Showtime's streaming service.

=== Awards and nominations ===
Year	Award	Category	Nominee(s)	Result	Ref.
2019	Golden Globe Awards	Best Actor – Television Series Musical or Comedy	Sacha Baron Cohen	Nominated	
2019	Directors Guild of America Awards	Outstanding Directorial Achievement in Variety/Talk/News/Sports – Regularly Scheduled Programming	Sacha Baron Cohen, Nathan Fielder, Daniel Gray Longino & Dan Mazer (for "102")	Nominated	
2019	Primetime Emmy Awards	Outstanding Variety Sketch Series	Who Is America?	Nominated	
2019	Primetime Emmy Awards	Outstanding Directing for a Variety Series	Sacha Baron Cohen, Nathan Fielder, Daniel Gray Longino and Dan Mazer (for "102")	Nominated	
2019	Primetime Emmy Awards	Outstanding Picture Editing for Variety Programming	Vera Drew, Eric Notarnicola, Roger Nygard, Matt Davis and Jeremy Cohen (for "102")	Nominated	
