= Andrew Newman (TV producer) =

- Born: Andrew William Newman; 4 November 1969 (age 55); Plymouth, England
- Occupation(s): CEO, Spelthorne Community Television
- Employers: Formerly Objective Media Group; Formerly Channel 4
- Organization: Formerly BAFTA
- Known for: Brass Eye; The 11 O'Clock Show; Da Ali G Show; Peep Show; The Inbetweeners; Who Is America

Andrew Newman (born 4 November 1969) is a British television executive and producer.

Newman was Head of Comedy and Entertainment at Channel 4, he was appointed Chief Executive of Objective Productions in 2009, and was Chairman of BAFTA's Television Committee. He is now CEO of Spelthorne Community Television.

== Career ==
Newman began his TV career on Channel 4's The Big Breakfast. He was an assistant producer on The Word and developed a strand entitled The Hopefuls that The Guardian called "infamous".

Newman had production roles on Brass Eye, The Sunday Show, The 11 O'Clock Show and Da Ali G Show.

Newman joined Channel 4 as Commissioned Editor, Entertainment, in 1998. He later became Head of Programmes for digital channel E4 and became Head of Entertainment at Channel 4 after a period as Controller of Entertainment at Channel Five. He was later appointed Head of Comedy and Entertainment at Channel 4.

During his time at Channel 4, Newman commissioned and oversaw Peep Show, Derren Brown, Balls of Steel, The Friday Night Project, Star Stories, 8 Out of 10 Cats, The IT Crowd, Fonejacker, and The Inbetweeners.

In 2009, Newman left Channel 4 to become Chief Executive of Objective Productions.

Newman is now CEO of Spelthorne Community Television a production company he formed with Sacha Baron Cohen in 2015.

Newman was an Executive Producer of Who Is America?, Sacha Baron Cohen's 2018 Showtime series.
