= 2013 shooting of Santa Cruz police officers =

Shooting of police officers in Santa Cruz, California

- Location: North Branciforte Avenue, Santa Cruz, California, U.S.
- Date: February 26, 2013; Approx. 3:30 p.m.-4:00 p.m. (PST)
- Attack type: Shooting, shootout
- Weapons: .45-caliber handgun, officer's service weapon
- Deaths: 3 (including the perpetrator)
- Injuries: 1
- Perpetrator: Jeremy Peter Goulet

On February 26, 2013, Santa Cruz Police Department officers Sergeant Loran Baker and Detective Elizabeth Butler were shot and killed during an investigation. After a short interaction regarding an allegation and a negotiation to be placed under arrest, Jeremy Goulet shot both officers who were standing in front of his house, and then stole an officer's service pistol and their unmarked car. Goulet fled in the police vehicle, but later ditched it when a heavy presence of officers arrived on scene. Goulet made an attempt to flee on foot, but was killed in a shootout with four other officers.

The officers were the first officers to be killed in the line of duty in the history of the Santa Cruz Police Department.

== Shooting ==
At about 3:30 p.m. PST, Sgt. Loran Baker and Detective Elizabeth Butler, who were in plain clothes, went to Jeremy Goulet's North Branciforte Avenue residence to question him regarding an accusation that he broke into a co-worker's home and made sexual advances towards her. Goulet opened his front door, talking to officers without exiting the home, and officers then advised Goulet that he would be placed under arrest. Goulet quickly walked away and went through another entrance of the house, from where he fired five rounds from a .45-caliber handgun, wounding the officers who were still standing at the doorstep. He then walked up to Baker and fired two more rounds into him, took his weapon, and fired two rounds into Butler. Goulet texted his twin brother, "I'm in big trouble, I love you."

He then stole Baker's gun, bulletproof vest, and the officers' unmarked police vehicle, and drove off. For several minutes, Goulet was either driving or sitting in the parked car to hide from police, and multiple police vehicles were arriving on scene to corner Goulet. He ditched the car, and then ran where officers had confronted him. Police spotted Goulet hiding behind a fence, and ordered Goulet to show his hands. Goulet ran down an alley for several minutes, hopping fences. Sgt. Stefan Fish, who was off-duty but heard about the shootings, and three Santa Cruz police officers, Sgt. Jose Garcia and officers Barnaby Clark and Tim Shields, encountered Goulet in an alley behind Doyle Street. The officers opened fire on Goulet, firing 54 rounds in total. Goulet, who was armed with his own handgun and the gun he stole from Baker, fired both guns, firing 15 rounds. Goulet's bullets struck garages and a fire truck and grazed the leg of a woman who was at a nearby street, but hit no one else. Goulet was killed instantly by the officers' rounds.

About 100 people were present at Branciforte Middle School during the shootings. The school, which was about half a mile from the original shooting scene, was placed on lockdown.

== Victims ==
Sgt. Loran Lee "Butch" Baker, Jr. (September 16, 1961 – February 26, 2013) was a 28-year veteran of the force, and Detective Elizabeth Chase Butler (March 16, 1974 – February 26, 2013) was a 10-year veteran of the force. They were the first Santa Cruz Police Department officers to be killed in the line of duty since the department's founding in the mid-1800s.

== Perpetrator ==
Jeremy Goulet, 35, grew up in Southern California, near Edwards Air Force Base. In 2000, he graduated from San Diego State University with a Bachelor's degree in criminal justice. In San Diego, Goulet was cited for two misdemeanors after he was allegedly caught "peeping” in 1999 and 2000. He served in the military, spending six years in the Marine Corps Reserve, where he was discharged in June 2002. Personnel records list his specialties as helicopter mechanic trainee and military police. He had served three years in the U.S. Army, up until February 2007. Goulet was a Blackhawk helicopter pilot, but was never assigned to a war zone.

In 2008, Goulet was accused and convicted of a sex crime that took place at an apartment complex in Portland, Oregon, for allegedly filming an unsuspecting 22-year-old woman in the shower. The victim's boyfriend had confronted Goulet on three occasions, in which during the second occasion, he got into a scuffle with Goulet, and told him not to come back. Several weeks later, Goulet, armed with a handgun, confronted the woman's boyfriend again, enkindling a physical fight. The victim's boyfriend struck Goulet in the face and bit his ear, and Goulet allegedly then fired several shots, none of which hit the other man. A mugshot of Goulet from this incident shows his face with lacerations caused by the woman's boyfriend. Goulet was charged with invasion of privacy, not having a permit to carry a concealed weapon, and attempted murder, and was later acquitted of the attempted murder charge but convicted of the others. He was ordered to undergo sex offender treatment and was sentenced to probation. He had a dispute with his probation officer, and violated his probation, and was thus sentenced to two years in jail. According to Goulet's father, the probation dispute and sentencing soured him on the American justice system.

In 2012, Goulet moved to Berkeley, California, in a home he shared with his brother. Neighbors reported arguments and disturbances from their household. He had worked as a barista at a coffee shop in Berkeley for several months, but was later fired for conflicts with co-workers. About a month before the shooting, Goulet moved to a house in Santa Cruz, which he shared with roommates. He was hired by another coffee shop there, The Kind Grind. Four days before the shooting, Goulet was arrested by Santa Cruz police on suspicion of disorderly conduct, in an incident that took place on the same street he lived on. He listed his occupation as a barista on jail records, and posted $250 bail. Goulet was fired from The Kind Grind the following day, for the alleged incident that lead to his arrest. Goulet apparently broke into the co-worker's house on the night of February 22 and made inappropriate sexual advances toward her. The co-worker filed a police report and talked to police more about the allegations on the afternoon of February 26.

Goulet had a plane ticket to New Mexico, where he had family, and planned to fly there four days after the shooting.

== See also ==
- List of homicides in California
- 2020 boogaloo murders
- Christopher Dorner shootings and manhunt
