= 2020 Oakland–Ben Lomond shootings =

Killings of security personnel and law enforcement officers in California

- Part of Boogaloo movement
- Location: Oakland, California, U.S. Ben Lomond, California, U.S.
- Date: Oakland shooting: May 29, 2020; Santa Cruz County shootout: June 6, 2020
- Attack type: Shooting, bombing, shootout
- Weapons: AR-9 short-barrelled rifle, improvised explosive devices
- Deaths: 2
- Injuries: 4 (including one of the suspects)
- Motive: Anti-police sentiment, right-wing extremism
- Convicted: Steven Carrillo and Robert Justus

In late May and early June 2020, two ambush-style attacks occurred against security personnel and law enforcement officers in California. The attacks left two dead and injured three others.

The attacks began on May 29, when a drive-by shooting occurred in front of a federal courthouse in Oakland, resulting in the death of a security officer contracted with the Federal Protective Service. Over a week later on June 6, Santa Cruz County sheriff's deputies were shot at and also attacked with improvised explosive devices; one of them died as a result.

U.S. Air Force sergeant Steven Carrillo was arrested soon after the second attack. A second suspect, Robert Justus, surrendered to authorities five days later. The FBI indicated that Carrillo was associated with the boogaloo movement, a loosely organized American far-right anti-government extremist movement whose participants say they are preparing for a second American Civil War. Carrillo used the George Floyd protests as a cover to attack police officers, according to the FBI. A white van owned by Carrillo contained a ballistic vest with a patch bearing boogaloo symbolism. Carrillo is alleged to have written "boog" and the phrase "I became unreasonable" (a popular meme among boogaloo groups) in his own blood on the hood of a vehicle he hijacked. According to federal authorities, the suspects were motivated by the boogaloo movement's ideology, and allegedly intended to spread its extremist views and start a civil war.

== Attacks ==
=== Oakland shooting ===
At around 9:44 pm PDT on May 29, 2020, an initially unknown assailant (later identified as Carrillo) fired a rifle out of the sliding door of a white van, striking security personnel stationed outside the Ronald V. Dellums Federal Building in Oakland, California. Two Triple Canopy security officers contracted with the Federal Protective Service were shot, resulting in the death of David Patrick Underwood and serious injury to the other. The attack occurred during George Floyd protests in Oakland, but the two were not related. Video surveillance later revealed that the van did not have license plates and had been in the area for at least half an hour. A man was seen exiting the driver's seat and walking around for 10 minutes before the attack.

On October 23, 2020, the U.S. Attorney's Office in the District of Minnesota announced they had filed federal charges against another boogaloo adherent and alleged agent provocateur who had traveled from Texas to Minneapolis to participate in a George Floyd protest on May 27–28, 2020. In the indictment, he was alleged to have been in contact with Carrillo via text message, and to have texted Carrillo to instruct him to "go for police buildings". In response, Carrillo allegedly replied, "I did better lol", which prosecutors believe was a reference to killing Underwood blocks away from the unrelated Black Lives Matter protest. The man also allegedly asked Carrillo for money, saying he needed "to be in the woods for a bit." Carrillo reportedly provided him with $200 via a cash app.

=== Ben Lomond attack ===
On June 6, 2020, Santa Cruz County Sheriff's Department deputies arrived at Carrillo's residence in Ben Lomond, California, ten miles north of the city of Santa Cruz. In response, Carrillo allegedly fired at the deputies with an AR-15 style rifle, seriously injuring one deputy and killing Sheriff Sergeant Damon Gutzwiller. Two nearby California Highway Patrol officers responded to the scene, and were met with gunfire, wounding one officer. Deputies and officers were also attacked with improvised explosive devices. During the shootout, Carrillo was hit and fled on foot to a nearby highway where he hijacked a car. He abandoned the car minutes later. According to the criminal complaint against him, Carrillo scrawled messages in his own blood on the hijacked car that said "I became unreasonable", "stop the duopoly", and "Boog". Carrillo tried to take another car from where it was parked at a home, but was restrained by the homeowner and another civilian. Carrillo was arrested in connection with the attack.

== Perpetrators ==
Steven Carrillo at the time a 32-year-old Air Force staff sergeant from Ben Lomond, California, who began serving in 2009. He was on active duty at Travis Air Force Base near Fairfield, California, as an airman in the Phoenix Ravens program, a special unit tasked with guarding American military personnel and aircraft at unsecure foreign airfields. He had worked at the base since 2018, though he had served in Kuwait for four months in 2019. A former friend of Carrillo's told ABC News that Carrillo identified as a libertarian.

Robert Alvin Justus Jr. at the time a 30-year-old man from Millbrae, California.

== Investigation ==
By June 2, 2020, investigators believed the attackers were targeting uniformed officers. An abandoned white van that held firearms, ammunition, and bomb-making equipment contained evidence that led to Carrillo's home in Ben Lomond. A ballistic vest found in the white van bore a patch with the boogaloo symbols of Hawaiian-style print and igloos. At his home he opened fire on officers, was shot in the process, fled on foot, and hijacked a nearby car. He was later found and arrested, bleeding from his hip. According to an official from the Bureau of Alcohol, Tobacco, Firearms and Explosives (ATF), a homemade machine gun with a silencer was used in the shootings. The weapon was a homemade firearm and did not have manufacturer markings.

Acting Deputy Secretary of Homeland Security Ken Cuccinelli described the Oakland shooting as an "act of domestic terrorism". The FBI announced on June 16 that Steven Carrillo was associated with the boogaloo movement and that he and Justus had deliberately chosen the night of protests in Oakland for cover for the May 29 attack. The FBI agent-in-charge of the investigation stated, "There is no evidence that these men had any intention to join the demonstration in Oakland. They came to Oakland to kill cops." Beforehand, Carrillo posted on Facebook, "Go to the riots and support our own cause. Show them the real targets" and "Use their anger to fuel our fire. Think outside the box. We have mobs of angry people to use to our advantage." The attack took place several blocks from a protest at Oakland City Hall. A former friend of Carrillo's told interviewers, "Excessive use of force on unarmed civilians — that was a huge thing for him... It was a mental tipping point for him." The hijacked car had "boog", "I became unreasonable", and "stop the duopoly" written in Carrillo's blood on the vehicle's hood. "I became unreasonable" is a popular phrase in boogaloo memes, and is a quote from Marvin Heemeyer, the perpetrator of the 2004 "Killdozer" rampage in which he demolished several buildings over a zoning dispute. "Stop the duopoly" is also a popular fixation among boogaloo adherents, referring to the dominance of the Republican and Democratic parties in American politics.

Authorities linked the crimes to the boogaloo movement and said the men used recent demonstrations against racial injustice as a cover to attack law enforcement. The FBI agent in charge of the investigation said in a news conference that the suspects did not appear to intend to join the protests, saying, "They came to Oakland to kill cops."

Using a search warrant, the FBI investigated posts from Carrillo's Facebook account posted between May 28 and 29. One message read, "It's on our coast now, this needs to be nationwide. It's a great opportunity to target the specialty soup bois." (According to the FBI, "soup bois" may refer to federal law enforcement agents.) Another read, "Its kicking off now and if its not kicking off in your hood then start it. Show them the targets."

Justus was declared a suspect in the Oakland shooting and placed under FBI surveillance. He turned himself in at the federal building in San Francisco five days after Carrillo's arrest.

== Prosecution ==
=== Carrillo's murder prosecution, guilty plea, and sentencing ===
Carrillo was charged with 19 felonies, including murder and attempted murder. The charges carried lying in wait enhancements. Carrillo's lawyer said that his client was "left deeply shaken" by the suicide of his wife in 2018 and had experienced a traumatic brain injury in 2009. Federal prosecutors opted not to seek a death sentence. On August 27, 2020, Carrillo pleaded not guilty to the murder charge for the sergeant killed in Santa Cruz. During his arraignment, Carrillo wore a face mask with the words "We the people" written in marker, along with initials "BLM" and "Portland, Kenosha, George Floyd and Breonna Taylor". Preliminary hearings for charges related to the Oakland shooting were slated for December 2020 but postponed to March 2021 because of the ongoing case around the attack in Ben Lomond, in which a Santa Cruz County deputy sheriff was slain and others were injured.

In February 2022, Carrillo pleaded guilty to killing Underwood and the attempted murder of the other officer. He admitted that he visited Facebook the day before the shooting to ask if anyone was "down to boog", connecting with the man who drove the van from which Carrillo fired 19 rounds from a homemade AR-15. The defense and prosecution agreed to recommend to the court a sentence of 41 years in prison for the drive-by shooting at the Oakland federal courthouse, which was handed down by the court in June 2022. On June 28, 2022, Carrillo pleaded guilty to the murder of Damon Gutzwiller. On August 26, 2022, Carrillo was sentenced to life in prison without the possibility of parole for Gutzwiller's murder.

=== Justus ===
Justus faced charges of aiding and abetting murder and aiding and abetting attempted murder. He pled not guilty to the charges. On March 15, 2024, Justus was sentenced to life in prison.

== Reaction ==
Several conservative commentators inaccurately linked the shootings to those who were protesting the murder of George Floyd at the time. Media Matters for America, a left-wing organization that monitors right-wing media, characterized right-wing coverage of Underwood's death as an attempt to "discredit the wider Black Lives Matter protests". Fox News anchor Eric Shawn spoke of the George Floyd protests, saying "we have been under attack from domestic terrorists," then reported Underwood's killing. Sean Hannity asserted Underwood was "murdered by rioters". On June 1, then-45th President Donald Trump repeated the claim in a speech about the protests, saying, "A federal officer in California, an African American enforcement hero, was shot and killed. These are not acts of peaceful protest. These are acts of domestic terror."

During his August 2020 speech at the Republican National Convention, then-Vice President Mike Pence falsely implied that Underwood had been killed by radical leftist activists. Rebecca Kaplan, the City Councilmember At-Large for Oakland, California, denounced Pence's statement, saying, "Mr. Underwood's tragic murder was not part of any demonstration, but an act of a violent, armed white supremacist... Pence's lies attempt to discredit important movements for social justice, and to move blame away from violent white supremacist murder."

== See also ==
- List of homicides in California
- 2009 shootings of Oakland police officers
- 2013 shooting of Santa Cruz police officers
- George Floyd protests in Minneapolis–Saint Paul
- Gretchen Whitmer kidnapping plot
- Christopher Dorner shootings and manhunt
- Operation Gladio
- Right-wing terrorism
