= Boogaloo movement =

American far-right anti-government movement

A version of the boogaloo flag

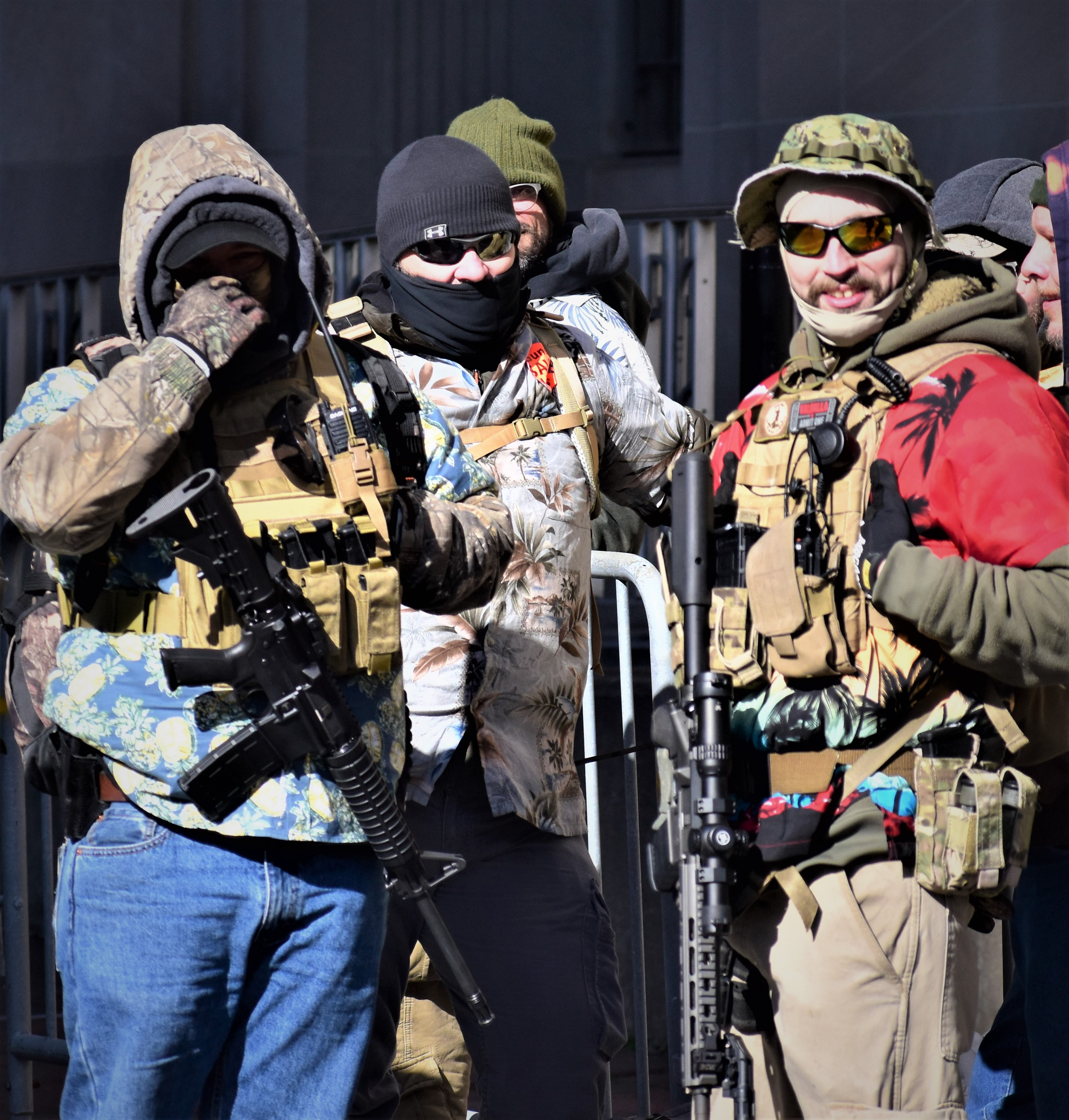
Participants in the boogaloo movement often wear Hawaiian shirts along with military fatigues to identify themselves at protests such as this VCDL Lobby Day gun rights demonstration on January 20, 2020, in Richmond, Virginia.

The boogaloo movement, whose adherents are often referred to as boogaloo boys or boogaloo bois, is a loosely organized far-right anti-government extremist movement in the United States. It has also been described as a militia. Adherents say they are preparing for, or seek to incite, a second American Civil War or second American Revolution which they call "the boogaloo" or "the boog".

The movement consists of pro-gun, anti-government groups. The specific ideology of each group varies and views on topics such as race differ widely. Some are white supremacist or neo-Nazi groups who believe that the impending unrest will be a race war. There are also groups that condemn racism and white supremacy, although attempts by some individual elements of the movement to support anti-racist groups and movements such as Black Lives Matter have been met with wariness and skepticism, and researchers and journalists are unsure if they are genuine or meant to obscure the movement's actual objectives.

The movement primarily organizes online, but adherents have appeared at in-person events including anti-lockdown and George Floyd protests. Heavily armed, boogaloo members are often identified by their attire of Hawaiian shirts and military fatigues.

Boogaloo emerged on 4chan and subsequently spread to other platforms. Although usage of the term dates back to 2012, the movement did not gain mainstream attention until late 2019. Adherents use boogaloo, including variations so as to avoid social media crackdowns, to refer to violent uprisings against the federal government, often anticipated to follow government confiscation of firearms.

Individuals affiliated with the boogaloo movement have been charged with crimes, including the January 6, 2021, attack on the U.S. Capitol; the murders of a security contractor and a police officer; a plot to kidnap Michigan governor Gretchen Whitmer; and incidents related to participation in the George Floyd riots. In mid-2020, several companies acted to limit the movement's activities and visibility on their social media and chat platforms.

== Overview ==
=== Naming and identity ===
The term boogaloo alludes to the 1984 sequel film Breakin' 2: Electric Boogaloo, which was derided by critics as a derivative rehash. Subsequently, appending "2: Electric Boogaloo" to a name became a jocular verbal template for any kind of sequel, especially one that strongly mimics the original. The boogaloo movement adopted its identity based on the anticipation of a second American Civil War or second American Revolution, which was referred to as "Civil War 2: Electric Boogaloo" and became popularly known among adherents as "the boogaloo".

Participants in the boogaloo movement also use other similar-sounding derivations of the word, including boog, boojahideen, big igloo, blue igloo, and big luau to avoid crackdowns and automated content flags imposed by social media sites to limit or ban boogaloo-related content. Intensified efforts by social media companies to restrict boogaloo content have caused adherents to use terms even further detached from the original word such as spicy fiesta to refer to the movement. The boogaloo movement has created logos and other imagery incorporating igloo snow huts and Hawaiian prints based on these derivations. Adherents of the boogaloo sometimes carry black-and-white versions of the American flag, with a middle stripe replaced with a stripe of red tropical print and the stars replaced with an igloo. The stripes sometimes list the names of people who have been killed by police, including Eric Garner, Vicki Weaver, Robert LaVoy Finicum, Breonna Taylor, and Duncan Lemp.

Adherents attend protests heavily armed and wearing tactical gear, and sometimes identify themselves by wearing Hawaiian shirts along with military fatigues. The boogaloo movement has also used imagery popular among the far-right such as the Pepe the Frog meme.

=== Political beliefs ===
Groups in the boogaloo movement are far-right, anti-government, and pro-gun. Some groups have also been variously described as being alt-right, anarchist, libertarian, or right-libertarian. According to Alex Newhouse, a digital researcher at Middlebury's CTEC, "the way we know the 'boogaloo' movement is a far-right movement is because they draw a line directly from Waco and Ruby Ridge. They hold up things like the McVeigh bombing of the Oklahoma City federal building and the armed response to Ruby Ridge as "heroic moments in American history", which they view as citizens standing up to government oppression. Newhouse also identified the choice by adherents of the movement to provide armed protection to private businesses during anti-lockdown protests and George Floyd protests as evidence that the movement is right-wing, saying that leftists would not be likely to do the same as they are more likely to view large corporations as an integral component of capitalist exploitation. According to Newhouse, this emphasis on the importance of private property is part of what makes the boogaloo movement "very much an extreme right libertarian ideology".

The groups and individuals often self-identify as libertarian, although a few individuals have also described themselves as adherents of related ideologies, including anarcho-capitalism and minarchism. There are also "a few apparent anarchists", including some self-identified "anarchists". Pitcavage described the "anarchists" who have adopted "'boogaloo' rhetoric" as generally being right-wing anarcho-capitalists, not what he terms "left-wing anarchists". MacNab has stated that "most boogaloo members are libertarian anarchists who hate cops". The SPLC notes that "a look at the movement's origins and its online communities make it clear that its politics are much more complicated than straightforward libertarianism". The Daily Beast reported in October 2020 that the varying ideologies of groups within the movement cause confusion about its overall ideology, and that some adherents intentionally obfuscate the movement's ideology in order to attract more followers.

In June 2020, the Department of Homeland Security (DHS) tweeted in reply to a Politico article about the boogaloo movement that an intelligence bulletin released by the agency "does NOT identify the Boogaloo movement as left-wing OR right-wing" and stated that "they are simply violent extremists from both ends of the ideological spectrum". The Guardian refuted the DHS' description of the movement, saying that experts on extremism concur that the boogaloo movement is right-wing. Daryl Johnson, a former DHS analyst, told The Guardian that he believed the DHS' claim that the boogaloo movement was not right-wing was "playing politics". Johnson further stated that the boogaloo movement is "an ultra-nationalist primarily white movement of people who belong to the militias. Could there be somebody that has different sympathies that's part of it? Sure. It's predominantly right-wing".

Members of boogaloo groups typically believe in accelerationism and support any action that will speed impending civil war and eventually the collapse of society. According to The Economist, boogaloo group members have supported to this end the "spreading of disinformation and conspiracy theories, attacks on infrastructure (such as that on New York's 311 line) and lone-wolf terrorism". Some participants in the movement claim that the group and its ideology are nothing more than online jokes, but some law enforcement officials and researchers maintain that people connected to the groups have been implicated in plans to commit real violence. The Tech Transparency Project has observed that while public posts on boogaloo Facebook pages tend to be satirical, members of private boogaloo groups "exchang[e] detailed information and tactics on how to organize and execute a revolt against American authorities". Some of the private groups ban the sharing of memes to keep the conversation focused on serious topics. The Network Contagion Research Institute (NCRI) has also commented on the mix of serious and joking content, writing that "this ambiguity is a key feature of the problem: Like a virus hiding from the immune system, the use of comical-meme language permits the network to organize violence secretly behind a mirage of inside jokes and plausible deniability". According to the Anti-Defamation League, boogaloo adherents' use of humor makes their content more digestible by softening the violent underpinnings of some of their beliefs. While many people might reject an explicit call for violence, some might be more receptive to a meme that cloaks such violent sentiment with an overlay of humor. Counter-extremism organizations have also noticed an overlap of antisemitic, white supremacist Christian Identity (CI) beliefs and Boogaloo. For example the "Boogaloo Intel Drop" webpage promoted the theology and preparing for societal collapse. CI beliefs themselves also converge with accelerationism.

Some boogaloo groups are white supremacist or neo-Nazi and specifically believe that "the boogaloo" will be a race war. Some boogaloo groups have condemned racism. According to The Guardian, "there's real disagreement, even among experts who monitor extremist groups, about whether the 'boogaloo' movement as a whole should be described as 'white supremacist'". Analysts from the ADL and Middlebury's Center on Terrorism, Extremism and Counterterrorism (CTEC) have argued that "a significant number of 'boogaloo' supporters are genuinely not white supremacist". The researchers have described the movement as having two wings: "one advocating for race war and one obsessed with societal breakdown and rebellion against the government". However, "other experts say that lip service from some 'boogaloo' supporters about wanting to be a multi-racial movement should not be taken seriously". The Southern Poverty Law Center (SPLC) has said that "few of [the boogaloo movement's] adherents are interested in aligning with Black Lives Matter or antifascist protesters against police brutality". According to Joan Donovan, director of the Shorenstein Center on Media, Politics and Public Policy at Harvard Kennedy School, "[w]e're equivocating for the sake of an imagined audience. The idea that you would dismantle the US government at this stage is to undo the protections that have been granted to black people, queer people, disabled people, to stop foreign policy related to immigration. There are always racialized and eugenic sub-themes in these groups. That's what war is, at its base. It's about who should live. I don't think you can get away from the ways in which the rhetoric supports a white supremacist ideology, once you start talking about the kinds of policies or strategies they think need to be implemented".

The boogaloo movement has also been described as a militia. Lois Beckett, writing for The Guardian, has compared it to the right-wing anti-government militia and patriot movements of the 1990s and 2000s, stating that "supporters see the current federal government as illegitimate, while remaining deeply patriotic. They revere the constitution and see themselves as the true descendants of America's founding fathers. In their view, current US lawmakers are the equivalent of occupying British forces during the revolutionary war. Among the 'boogaloo' merchandise for sale online are images of George Washington armed with a modern, AR-15-style rifle". Mark Pitcavage, a researcher at the Center on Extremism of the Anti-Defamation League (ADL), has identified the boogaloo movement's contempt for law enforcement as the element that most strongly distinguishes them from other militia groups.

=== Structure and membership ===
While boogaloo groups are often described as a part of a larger boogaloo movement, J. J. MacNab, a George Washington University fellow researching anti-government extremist groups, has said that she does not agree with this characterization: "since the majority of participants were radicalized elsewhere prior to donning a Hawaiian shirt—either in anti-government militant groups such as the Three Percenters or the militias, or in white supremacy groups—the Boogaloo shouldn't be considered an independent movement at this time". Speaking to the United States House Homeland Security Subcommittee on Intelligence and Counterterrorism on July 16, 2020, MacNab testified that the boogaloo movement "isn't really a movement. It's a dress code, it's a way of talking, it's jargon. The people who belong to it came from other extremist groups, usually on Facebook. They might have been militia, they might have been a white supremacy [group]. They picked it up somewhere and they donned that Hawaiian shirt, and yet they're treated as a separate movement, and the problem is you're ignoring the underlying areas that they came from". Bellingcat and the SPLC have also stated that other groups with their own distinct identities have adopted the boogaloo meme, including militias, groups comprising the patriot movement, and the Proud Boys.

The boogaloo movement has attracted some active-duty members of the military and veterans. While the number of active and former military members is believed to be small when compared to the overall size of the movement, extremism researcher Kathleen Belew has stated that their participation "is not a problem we should take lightly" due to the threat that they could "dramatically escalate the impact of fringe activism, pass on explosives expertise, [or share] urban warfare expertise". Following the filing of terrorism charges against three Nevada men with ties to the Department of Defense (DoD), the Naval Criminal Investigative Service (NCIS) stated in a June 2020 report: "Racially motivated violent extremist (RMVE) movements that subscribe to boogaloo have engaged in conceptual discussions about recruiting military or former military members for their perceived knowledge of combat training.... NCIS cannot discount the possibility of DoD affiliated individuals sympathetic to or engaged in the boogaloo movement." As of June 2020, four men who have been arrested and found to have ties to the boogaloo movement, including the alleged perpetrator of the 2020 boogaloo murders in California, have been veterans or active military servicemen.

== History ==
=== Emergence ===
Memes referring to "the boogaloo", a violent uprising or civil war, developed simultaneously among anti-government and white supremacist online communities in the early 2010s. According to the SPLC, both types of communities regularly used the term to refer to racist violence or a race war. Researchers at Network Contagion Research Institute (NCRI) and the Middlebury's CTEC both traced the origins of the boogaloo meme and the later movement based around it in part to the imageboard website 4chan, where the meme was often accompanied by references to "racewar" and "dotr" (day of the rope, a neo-Nazi reference to a fantasy involving murdering what the posters view to be "race traitors"). On /k/, 4chan's board devoted to discussing weapons, the term was found in posts tracing at least back to 2012. According to Bellingcat researchers, users of /k/ overlap with those of the political discussion board /pol/, where "militant white nationalism" is the "default ideological position". Although the researchers do not consider the /k/ board to be white nationalist, and the community actively discourages political discussion, they note racist content is commonplace. CTEC researchers attribute the growth of the movement to the /k/ board, but write that the meme itself also "grew organically on the racist board /pol/, due to significant user overlap between the two communities". The boogaloo meme migrated to other online communities and the SPLC wrote that boogaloo was a "well-established meme in some of the most violently racist spaces on the internet" by 2015. They traced usage of the meme back to 2013 on the now-defunct Iron March website, a fascist and neo-Nazi web forum known as the birthplace of the Atomwaffen Division, a neo-Nazi terrorist organization.

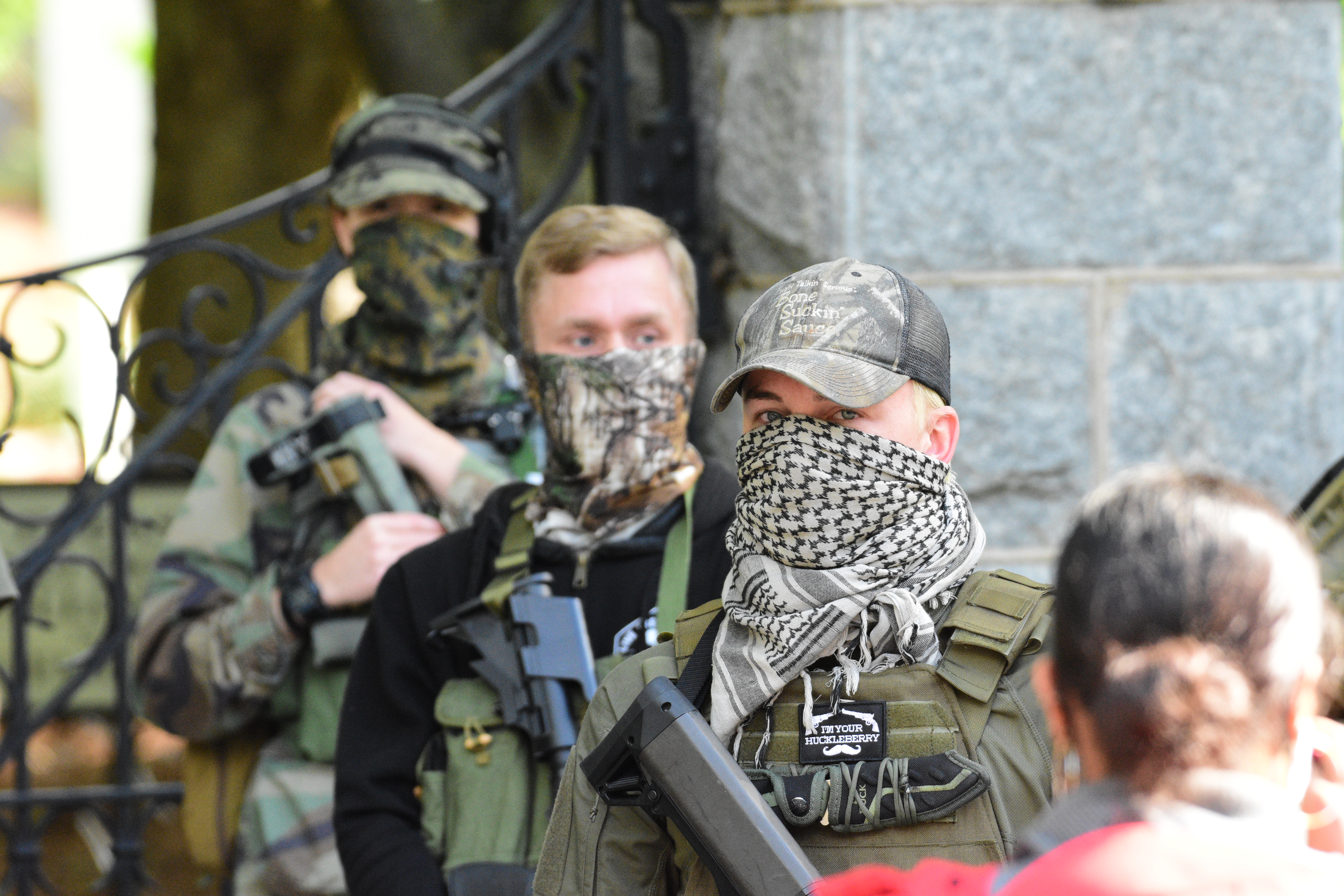
Boogaloo adherents participating in a "Blue Igloo" event in Raleigh, North Carolina in May 2020

Extremism researchers took notice of the word boogaloo being used in the context of the boogaloo movement in 2019, when they observed it being used among fringe groups including militias, gun rights movements, and white supremacist groups. Megan Squire, a computer science professor and online extremism researcher at Elon University, observed the term begin to be used among white supremacists on the Telegram messaging app in the summer of 2019, where they used it to describe a race war. Researchers at the NCRI found that use of the term boogaloo increased by 50% on Facebook and Twitter in the last months of 2019 and into early 2020. They attribute surges in popularity to a viral incident in November 2019 where a military veteran posted content mentioning the boogaloo on Instagram during a standoff with police and to the December 2019 impeachment of Donald Trump. The boogaloo movement experienced a further surge in popularity following the lockdowns that were implemented to try to slow the spread of the COVID-19 pandemic in the United States, and the Tech Transparency Project observed that the boogaloo groups appeared to be encouraged by then-President Trump's tweets about "liberating" states under lockdown. The Tech Transparency Project found that 60% of boogaloo Facebook groups had emerged following the pandemic lockdowns, during which time they amassed tens of thousands of followers. A May 2020 Bellingcat report identified Facebook as a particularly important platform for the movement, and in May and April 2020, Bellingcat and the NCRI both estimated the movement to have tens of thousands of adherents. A Facebook spokesperson said that Facebook and Instagram had changed their policies as of May 1 to "prohibit the use of ['boogaloo' and related] terms when accompanied by statements and images depicting armed violence".

==== Shooting of Duncan Lemp ====
On March 12, 2020, Duncan Lemp, a boogaloo Facebook group leader, was fatally shot by police in a no-knock raid of his home in Potomac, Maryland. Police had obtained a no-knock search warrant based on a tip that Lemp was violating a restriction from possessing firearms. However, Lemp's family has said they were unaware that he was under any such restriction. Lemp's family has also asserted that he was asleep when he was killed by police. Some far-right groups have theorized that Lemp was killed by police for his anti-government beliefs and his position in the boogaloo movement. J. J. MacNab, a fellow of the George Washington University extremism program, has described Lemp as a "martyr" of the boogaloo movement and warned that the increase in anti-police sentiment among boogaloo group members following his death may lead to violence against the police in the "foreseeable future". Some adherents of the boogaloo movement use phrases including "we are Duncan Lemp" and "his name was Duncan Lemp", which The New York Times has said they "repeat... like mantras". Adherents of the boogaloo have posted to Lemp's girlfriend's Instagram account promising to someday avenge his death.

=== Offline activities ===
Adherents of the boogaloo movement have been observed at pro-gun rights demonstrations, protests against COVID-19 lockdowns, and the George Floyd protests which began in May 2020 and continued through the year. Believers in the movement can also appear unexpectedly at events and protests initiated by others with apparently different affiliations.

In January 2020, members of boogaloo groups attended the 2020 VCDL Lobby Day, a gun rights rally organized by the Virginia Citizens Defense League. Virginia Governor Ralph Northam declared a state of emergency for the day of the rally in response to intelligence that indicated there was "a threat of an armed militia groups storming our capital". Under half of the 50,000 attendees predicted by organizers actually appeared at the demonstration and the event ended peacefully. The rally, which is an annual event, was particularly contentious in 2020 due to a number of gun control bills that were progressing through the Virginia legislature following the 2019 mass shooting in Virginia Beach. These included allowances for localities to ban firearms from venues and functions, red flag legislation that would allow police to confiscate weapons from those considered a risk to themselves or others, a law that would require background checks to buy or transfer a firearm, and a law that would impose a limit on the number of handguns that could be purchased in a month.

Adherents of the movement were also observed attending the anti-lockdown protests that began in mid-April throughout the United States, including in Washington, Tennessee, and New Hampshire. They viewed the lockdowns and related restrictions, which were imposed by state and local governments to try to slow the spread of the COVID-19 pandemic, as governmental overreach and some described them as "tyranny". Some members of boogaloo groups offered armed protection to businesses who wished to reopen in defiance of state shutdown orders.

==== George Floyd protests ====
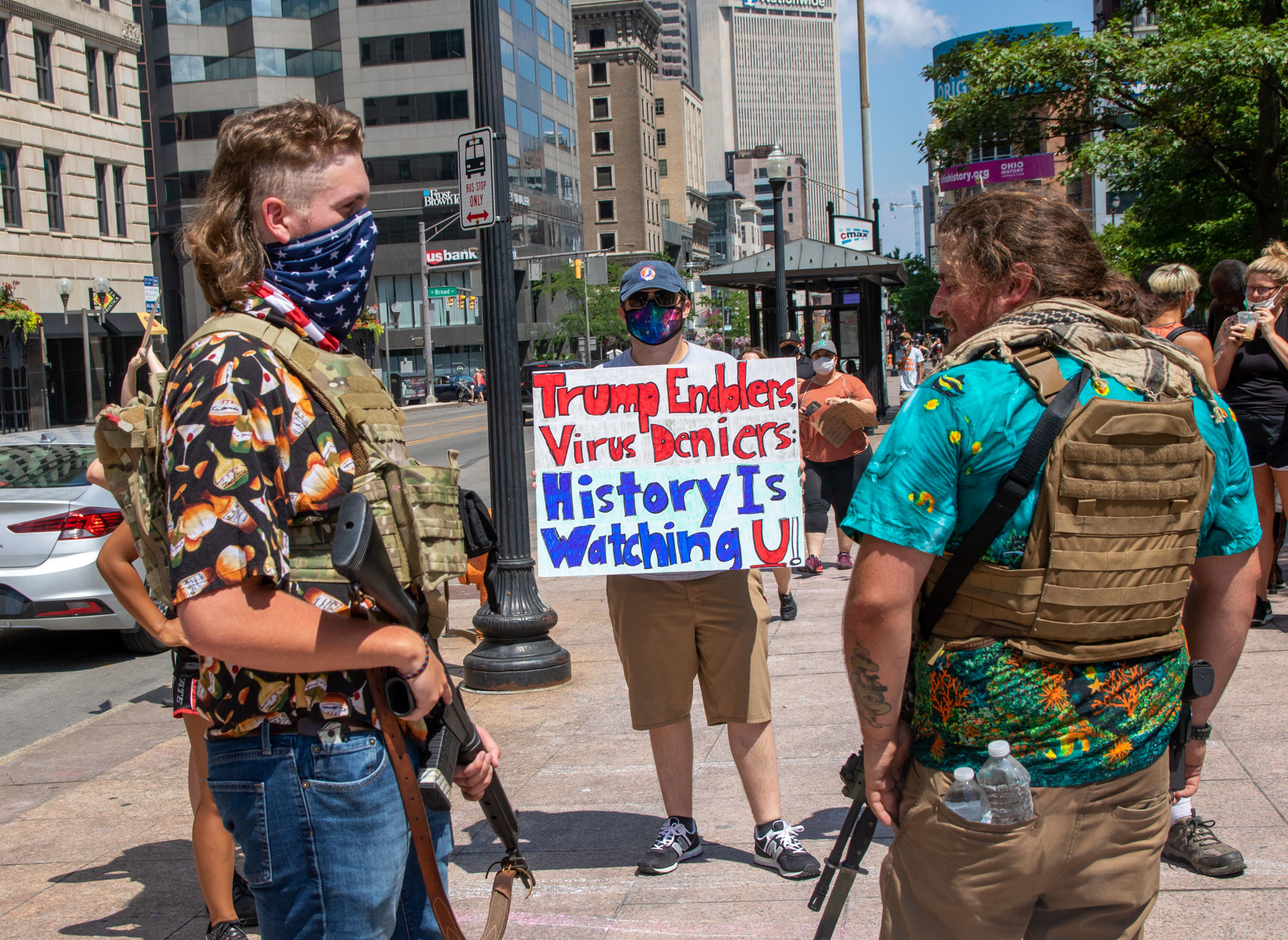
Boogaloo adherents (foreground) at a protest in Columbus, Ohio, July 18, 2020

Some members of boogaloo groups attended the protests that occurred across the United States beginning in May 2020 in response to the murder of George Floyd. On July 25, 2020, 28-year old Black Lives Matter protester Garrett Foster, who identified with the boogaloo movement and had expressed anti-racist, libertarian, and anti-police views, was shot and killed in an altercation with a motorist accelerating their vehicle into a crowd of protesters. According to Vice, although the boogaloo groups tried to position themselves as allies of the Black Lives Matter movement, they generally avoided addressing police brutality in the United States as a racial issue. Extremism researcher Robert Futrell spoke of the varied motivations of the adherents of the boogaloo movement who attended the protests, saying: "Some folks who identify as Boogaloo Bois share anti-police sentiments. Some are acting as self-appointed security, vowing to protect businesses from protesters. Some say they're monitoring the protests. Some are white supremacists trying to antagonize protesters". Posts in some online boogaloo groups called for their members to loot police stations and set fire to government buildings while some encouraged actions emulating the "rooftop Koreans", a reference to Korean store owners who shot at looters from roofs during the 1992 Los Angeles riots. There were a number of criminal incidents related to boogaloo adherents attending the George Floyd protests as well as the murders of a security contractor and a police officer believed to have been committed by two men associated with the boogaloo movement who used the protests as a distraction to commit their attacks.

=== Online activities ===
Groups belonging to the boogaloo movement organize on mainstream online platforms including Facebook, Instagram, Twitter and Reddit, in chat rooms on Discord and Telegram, and on more obscure platforms such as 4chan. Online extremism researcher Megan Squire observed references to the boogaloo in white supremacist Telegram chat rooms in the summer of 2019, before the movement began to become popular on gun forums in September of the same year. Vice has also noted the boogaloo meme was popular on the TikTok video sharing application, where the #Boogaloo hashtag had over two million views as of June 2020, although many posters are not believed to be serious adherents of the movement.

Social media companies have taken steps to limit boogaloo content and groups on their platforms. However, Squire observed in mid-June 2020 that despite Facebook's policy and enforcement changes to remove and demote boogaloo-related content, membership among boogaloo groups on the platform as well as on Discord and Reddit had remained steady or increased.

== Criminality and violence ==
People affiliated with the boogaloo movement have been arrested and five deaths have been publicly linked to boogaloo rhetoric. Some of the charges against people affiliated with the movement include murder, conspiracy to damage and destroy by fire and explosive, possession of unregistered firearms, making a terroristic threat against a peace officer, inciting a riot, aggravated breach of peace, and drugs charges.

=== Murders of police and security officers in California ===
United States Air Force sergeant Steven Carrillo was charged with the June 6, 2020 murder of a Santa Cruz County deputy and the May 29 murder of a Federal Protective Service officer in Oakland. At the time of the attacks, Carrillo was an active-duty member of an elite Air Force unit tasked with guarding American military personnel at unsecure foreign airfields. Carrillo wrote "Boog" and the phrases "I became unreasonable" (a popular meme among boogaloo groups) and "Stop the duopoly" in his own blood on the hood of a vehicle he hijacked. A patch with a boogaloo symbol and a ballistic vest bearing the boogaloo symbol of an American flag with an igloo instead of stars were also found in the white van allegedly used in the murders.

The FBI linked the crimes to the boogaloo movement and said Carrillo and an accomplice used recent demonstrations against racial injustice as a cover to attack police. The FBI agent in charge of the investigation said in a news conference that the men did not appear to intend to join the protests, saying: "They came to Oakland to kill cops".

Carrillo pleaded guilty to a federal murder charge and received a 41-year sentence in June 2022, while other state felony charges remained pending.

=== Plot to kidnap Michigan Governor Gretchen Whitmer ===
On October 8, 2020, a federal indictment against six men associated with the Wolverine Watchmen, a Michigan-based militia group, was unsealed. The indictment charges the men with plotting to kidnap Michigan Governor Gretchen Whitmer and violently overthrow the state government. The FBI became aware of the scheme in early 2020 after communications among the far-right group were discovered, and via an undercover agent who met with more than a dozen individuals at a meeting in Dublin, Ohio. Another seven men were charged with state crimes in relation to the plot.

Prosecutors alleged links between some of the suspects arrested with the broader boogaloo movement. According to an affidavit filed as a part of the state investigation, the seven men who were charged at a state level had been engaging in firearms training and tactical drills to "prepare for the 'boogaloo'". The leader of the group was known online as "Boogaloo Bunyan". An NBC News investigation into the suspects' social media profiles found a swift online radicalization following Whitmer's implementation of a statewide lockdown as part of an effort to mitigate the COVID-19 pandemic in Michigan.

=== Acts during George Floyd and Black Lives Matter protests ===
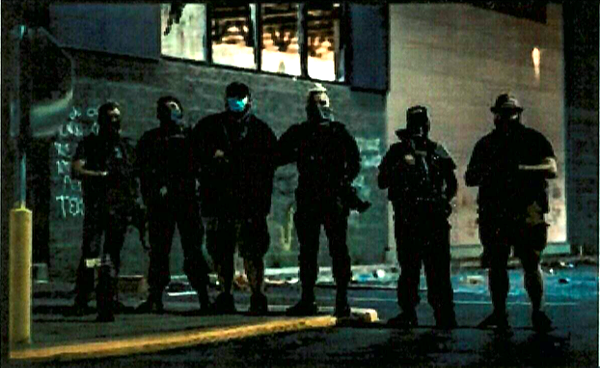
FBI photo of Boogaloo movement adherents in Minneapolis, May 28, 2020

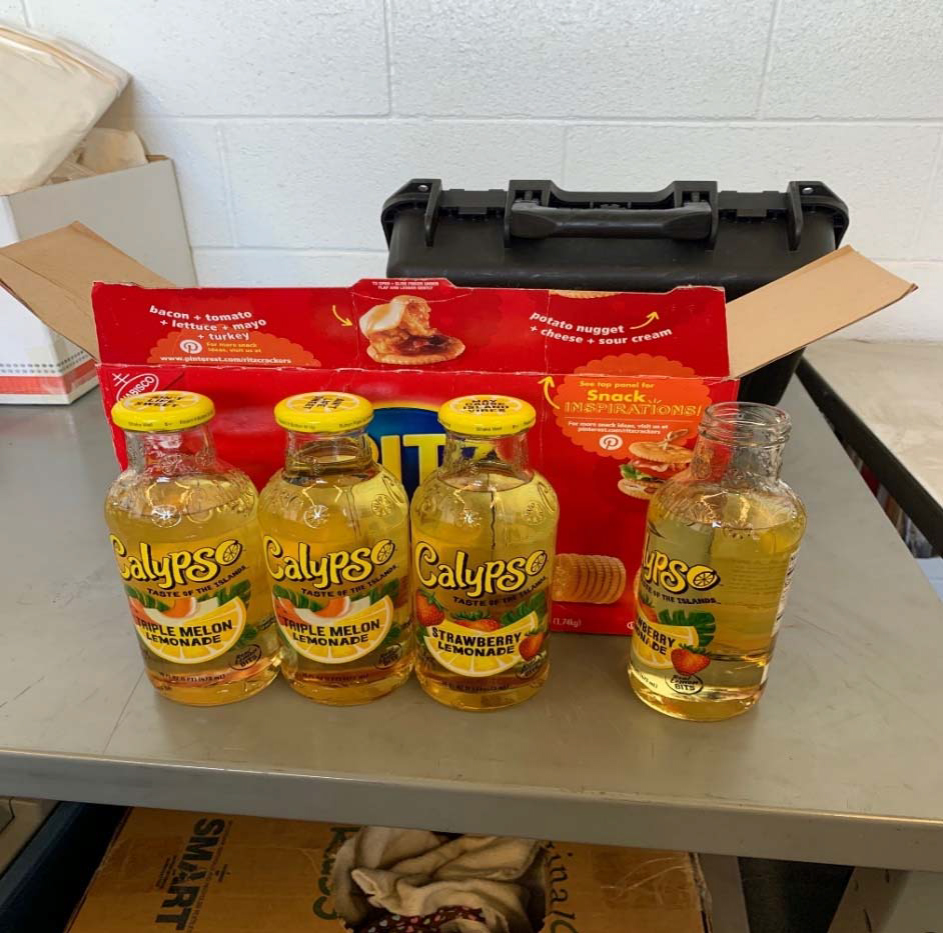
Molotov cocktails allegedly carried by Boogaloo movement individuals in Nevada, 2020

Three boogaloo movement members pleaded guilty to federal charges in the aftermath of the George Floyd protests in Minneapolis that occurred in late May 2020. As riots broke out after the murder of George Floyd on May 25, Michael Robert Solomon of New Brighton, Minnesota, recruited boogaloo movement members to participate with the hopes that chaos would lead to a civil war and would be blamed on the Black Lives Matter movement. Benjamin Ryan Teeter of Hampstead, North Carolina, and Ivan Harrison Hunter of Boerne, Texas, were among those who traveled to Minneapolis to participate in the unrest. After the riots abated, boogaloo adherents attempted to raise money to buy a training facility in South America. Solomon and Teeter connected with an FBI informant who had posed as a member of the Hamas organization, who they agreed to supply weapons to, and they also made plans to bomb a courthouse in the Twin Cities metropolitan area. Solomon and Teeter were arrested by federal agents in September 2020 before their plans were carried out. The two pleaded guilty to federal terrorism charges, Teeter in December 2020 and Solomon in May 2021, and faced potential prison sentences of up to 20 years.

On October 23, 2020, the U.S. Attorney's Office for the District of Minnesota announced they had filed federal rioting charges against Ivan Harrison Hunter, of Boerne, Texas, stating in charging documents that he fired 13 rounds from an AK-47-style semi-automatic rifle into the Minneapolis Police Department's Third Precinct building with civilians believed to be inside. Hunter identified himself to officers as the leader of a boogaloo group in South Texas. A few days before his arrest, Hunter was stopped in a truck in Austin along with two other men. The group was armed with pistols, an AK-47 style rifle, and AR-15 style rifles, and had many magazines attached to their vests. The man was further alleged in the indictment to have texted Steven Carrillo to "Go for police buildings". Carrillo replied, "I did better lol." (A few hours before this text-message exchange, Carrillo had murdered federal security officer David Patrick Underwood in an attack on Oakland, California, a crime to which Carrillo pleaded guilty to the crime in February 2022. Two days after the attack on the Minneapolis police station, Hunter asked Carrillo for money, saying he needed "to be in the woods for a bit." Carrillo reportedly provided him with $200 via a Cash App payment. Hunter pleaded guilty to federal riot charges in September 2021 for his involvement in events in Minneapolis in May 2020, and he was sentenced to four years in prison followed by three years of supervised release.

In May 2020, three men who identified themselves as members of the boogaloo movement were arrested by the FBI in Las Vegas, Nevada. The men, who had been plotting since April to bomb an electrical substation, had decided instead to focus on the George Floyd protests. At an anti-lockdown protest in Las Vegas several days earlier, they told a confidential informant that they intended to incite violence at a Floyd protest, by using an explosion "to hopefully create civil unrest and rioting throughout Las Vegas." They were arrested when they were found filling canisters with gasoline and creating Molotov cocktails on their way to such a protest on May 30, and each was charged with the federal crimes of conspiracy to damage and destroy by fire and explosive, and possession of unregistered firearms. They were also accused in state court of felony conspiracy, terrorism, and possession of explosives. The men pleaded not guilty to the state and federal charges. Each of the three men had ties to the military: one was a Navy veteran, another was an Army reservist, and the third was an Air Force veteran. The trio's cases were still pending as of 2022, with their trials being delayed due to COVID-19 and at the request of their lawyers.

Two men were arrested in Richland County, South Carolina on June 5, 2020, for attempting to incite a riot at a Floyd protest. Police believe the men are affiliated with the boogaloo movement. Both men were wearing Hawaiian shirts when they were arrested; one also had boogaloo patches and a flag; the other had two pistols and two long guns.

In June 2020, federal authorities arrested personal trainer Philip Russell Archibald from Lancaster, Texas, with ties to the boogaloo movement. Archibald was arrested on charges of operating a steroid trafficking ring and during a search of his home, police found steroids and firearms. He had previously posted on social media about using "guerrilla warfare" against members of the National Guard deployed at the Floyd protests, committing violence against looters, and "hunting Antifa". In 2021, Archibald pleaded guilty to drug-distribution conspiracy offenses, as well as gun offenses.

=== Other incidents ===
On November 23, 2019, a police officer approached the Mahopac, New York, home of a 28-year-old Afghanistan War veteran, to investigate an accusation of domestic violence. When the man refused to come out, police set up a cordon around his home. The man began streaming the events on his gun-themed Instagram account, where he used the username "Whiskey Warrior 556". The man, who was wearing body armor and armed with a knife, believed police had arrived to confiscate a 30-round magazine under his state's red flag laws. During the standoff, he began livestreaming on Instagram, referencing the boogaloo and posting memes. He gained over 100,000 followers during the incident, some of whom urged him not to surrender to police. One follower with a large following of his own encouraged others to travel to the town and "shoot traitors". The man's own posts became increasingly threatening, but he surrendered to police after a seven-hour standoff. He was arrested on charges related to the domestic violence accusation. The county sheriff's office denied the man's claims that the arrest was related to weapons and reported that officers had found no firearms or magazines in the home. The event was later identified as the cause of a large spike in boogaloo-related comments on the 4chan /pol/ board as well as on other boogaloo sites and right-wing militia social media pages, where followers had organized during the incident to disrupt police by bombarding them with phone calls and posted incitements of violence.

On April 11, 2020, Aaron Swenson, 38, a self-proclaimed boogaloo boy, was arrested after livestreaming (on Facebook Live) his hunt to kill a police officer. On the livestream, Swenson said he was driving around looking for lone police officers to ambush (referring to "finding his prey" and "hunting for tyrants and redcoats"). After a high-speed, nighttime police chase through Bowie County, Texas, he was apprehended wearing a Hawaiian shirt and tactical vest with three firearms, 156 rounds of ammunition, and a sword. The guns were loaded. Swenson had shared boogaloo memes on his Facebook page and other adherents of the movement watched and commented during his live stream. He had also posted a photo to Facebook the day after the shooting of Duncan Lemp in which he wore a Hawaiian shirt and combat vest and used the hashtag "#HisNameWasDuncan". Swenson was convicted of attempted murder of a police officer, terroristic threatening, evading arrest in a vehicle, and violation of the Texas Hate Crimes Act, and was sentenced to 50 years in prison.

In September 2020, federal prosecutors in Minnesota filed terrorism charges against Michael Robert Solomon, 30, of New Brighton, Minnesota, and Benjamin Ryan Teeter, 22, of Hampstead, North Carolina, both members of the Boogaloo Boys and a subgroup called the "Boojahideen." The pair had attempted to offer their services as "assets" and "mercenaries" to an undercover FBI agent they believed to be a senior member of Hamas. Both were indicted on one count of conspiring to provide, and attempting to provide material support to a designated foreign terrorist organization. The men discussed attacking various potential targets, including police, courthouses, government officials and monuments, and members of the media, and at points discussed the possibility of stealing weapons from National Guard armory or "assassinating" white supremacists while another person recorded it. Solomon and Teeter met with whom they believed to be a Hamas operative (actually an undercover informant) and provided the informant with five suppressors and a 3D-printed "auto sear" (device to convert semi-automatic rifles into fully automatic rifles.) Both Solomon and Teeter pleaded guilty. Solomon was sentenced to 36 months in prison followed by five years of supervised release. Teeter was sentenced to 48 months in prison followed by five years of supervised release.

The Daily Beast observed in an article published on October 9, 2020, that four state and federal operations to arrest a total of sixteen individuals associated with the boogaloo movement had transpired over the previous seven days, including the arrests of the men involved in the plot to kidnap Michigan Governor Whitmer. They noted the uptick in arrests could be attributed to increased law enforcement attention on the movement, but that it could also be explained by increased criminal activity by boogaloo-affiliated people and groups.

=== Participation in the January 6 United States Capitol attack ===
Supporters of the boogaloo movement participated in the January 6, 2021, U.S. Capitol attack. Some wore emblematic gear or symbols. A follower said several groups under his command helped storm the Capitol, taking the opportunity to strike against the federal government. Rioters also echoed boogaloo themes and used related terminology to express their readiness for "the boogaloo". Steven Daniel Thurlow, 50, of St. Clair Shores, Michigan, a Boogaloo member who wore military-style gear with a "Boogaloo" patch before participating in the January 6 attack on the Capitol, pleaded guilty in May 2022 to storming the Capitol.

A faction called the "Last Sons of Liberty" was specifically involved, with the group claiming participation on social media. Multiple members of the group were arrested.

== Reactions ==
=== Law enforcement and government ===
Federal law enforcement agencies and supporting organizations have issued statements warning of the possibility of violence related to the boogaloo movement. In April 2020, the Naval Criminal Investigative Service (NCIS) published a Threat Awareness Message about the movement and the potential danger it posed to police and government entities.

==== Threats related to 2020–2021 racial unrest ====
A May 29, 2020, memo published by the DHS warned officers of an extremist white supremacist Telegram channel encouraging its members to commit acts of violence and inciting them to "start the 'boogaloo'" during the George Floyd protests. Following the filing of terrorism charges against three Nevada men who had allegedly planned to incite a riot at the protests, the NCIS published a report on June 4 warning that boogaloo adherents had discussed recruiting former or active-duty military servicemen and they could not "discount the possibility of DoD affiliated individuals sympathetic to or engaged in the boogaloo movement." On June 15, 2020, the Trump administration issued a warning to police and public safety organizations that adherents of the boogaloo movement might target Washington, D.C. The National Capital Region Threat Intelligence Consortium, a fusion center that aids the DHS and other federal national security and law enforcement groups, wrote, "the District [of Columbia] is likely an attractive target for violent adherents of the boogaloo ideology due to the significant presence of US law enforcement entities, and the wide range of First Amendment-Protected events hosted here". The report also warned that adherents may live in D.C. or may be prepared to travel long distances to D.C. "to incite civil unrest or conduct violence encouraged in online forums associated with the movement". On June 19, the DHS published an intelligence report that drew a similar conclusion and stated that "domestic terrorists advocating for the boogaloo very likely will take advantage of any regional or national situation involving heightened fear and tensions to promote their violent extremist ideology and call supporters to action".

On June 26, 2020, Attorney General William Barr announced in a memo that he had created a Department of Justice task force to investigate "anti-government extremists" who had disrupted protests and attacked police officers, specifically identifying the boogaloo movement and "Antifa" as targets of the task force's investigation. The task force is led by attorneys Craig Carpenito and Erin Nealy Cox.

Members of the Trump administration made misleading statements incorrectly attributing boogaloo-related violence to radical leftist activists and inaccurately suggesting that the May and June murders of two police and security officers were tied to racial justice protests. On June 1, President Donald Trump said in a speech that the country "has been gripped by professional anarchists, violent mobs, arsonists, looters, criminals, rioters, antifa and others... A federal officer in California, an African American enforcement hero, was shot and killed. These are not acts of peaceful protest. These are acts of domestic terror." During his Republican National Convention speech on August 26, 2020, Vice President Mike Pence implied that Dave Patrick Underwood, an officer in the Department of Homeland Security Federal Protective Service, had been killed by radical leftist activists at a Floyd protest that was also in Oakland. Rebecca Kaplan, the City Councilmember At-Large for Oakland, California, denounced Pence's "deeply misleading statements" about the killing, saying that "Pence wrongly attempted to tie this killing to the Black Lives Matter movement, which, in fact, had no involvement in the killing... Mr. Underwood's tragic murder was not part of any demonstration, but an act of a violent, armed white supremacist... Pence's lies attempt to discredit important movements for social justice, and to move blame away from violent white supremacist murder."

=== Social media platforms ===
On May 1, 2020, Facebook amended its policy on violence and incitement to prohibit boogaloo and similar terms "when used with images or statements depicting armed violence". On June 5, 2020, Facebook told Reuters that it would make it harder to find groups associated with the boogaloo movement by no longer recommending such groups to members of similar associations. Facebook also told The Verge that it would be demoting boogaloo-related content in search results. On June 30, 2020, Facebook announced that it had removed a network of 220 boogaloo groups and 95 Instagram accounts as well as over 400 other groups that hosted similar content. Writing for CNBC, journalist Salvador Rodriguez observed that the removals occurred amidst a Facebook boycott in which companies including Coca-Cola, Starbucks, and Volkswagen announced they would no longer advertise on the platform due to "the hate speech and misinformation that persists on Facebook". Paid advertisements for body armor and other products using boogaloo keywords ran on Facebook and Instagram for several months prior to the removals.

TikTok hides hashtags related to the boogaloo movement, and their content policies prohibit videos containing firearms outside of a few exceptions, such as when used in a fictional context or when "used in a safe and controlled environment such as a shooting range". On July 2, 2020, a BBC News reporter was still able to find many boogaloo-related TikTok posts by users who had employed various methods to avoid detection by moderators on the platform.

A Twitter spokesperson said that Twitter views boogaloo content as free expression and does not ban accounts solely for their use of the term, but that they had banned numerous accounts that used the term for violating other policies, such as trying to circumvent a previous ban.

In a June 24, 2020 article on Vice, Tess Owen wrote that some of the most active boogaloo communities were on Discord, a chat program popular among online gamers. Following the publication of the article, which included screenshots of a Discord server where members of the military were sharing their expertise, Discord shut down the server and deleted the accounts of its members, determining they had violated Discord policy against "threatening and encouraging violence". With 2,258 users, it was believed to be the largest boogaloo community on Discord. The community created and migrated to a subreddit after their removal from Discord, but Reddit banned the subreddit shortly afterward.

The website Tree of Liberty, which described itself as the "press platform" for the boogaloo movement, was taken offline by its cloud hosting provider on January 12, 2021. It had been hosted on servers in Montreal since September 2020, which a moderator believed kept it beyond DHS data jurisdiction, but its service provider suspended it after being questioned by CBC News.

== See also ==
- Accelerationism
- List of militia organizations in the United States
- Radical right (United States)
