= Lobby day =

Lobby Day (also known as Advocacy Day) is a name used by non-governmental organizations (NGOs) for select days, often annual, when lay members meet politicians or public servants at various levels to advocate and explain support for legislation relevant to the NGO. While a national lobby day may be held by the national leadership of an organization, its regional or local affiliates may hold their own separate lobby days in order to not compete with the lobby.

== Examples ==
- Humane Society of the United States holds state-level Humane Lobby Days at various days for state governments
- PFLAG holds its national lobby day on January 13
- NARAL Pro-Choice America holds its national lobby day on April 7
- Americans for the Arts holds its Advocacy day on April 4–5
- Bread for the World holds its Lobby Day on June 14 in Washington, D.C., as part of its annual National Gathering
- Secular Coalition for America holds its Lobby day on September 26–27
