= Philip Van Cleave =

American gun rights advocate (born 1952)

- Born: 1952 (age 73–74); Kankakee, Illinois, U.S.
- Occupation: Gun rights advocate

Philip Van Cleave (born 1952 in Kankakee, Illinois) is an American gun rights advocate and the president of the Virginia Citizens Defense League (VCDL). In 2018, he appeared on the show Who is America? where he instructed preschool children how to use guns in a fictitious show.

== Early life ==
Van Cleave grew up in Illinois. When he was 16, his mother bought him his first gun: a .410 bore shotgun. When he was 21, he volunteered as a reserve deputy sheriff in San Antonio and purchased his first .357 magnum Ruger service revolver.

== Career ==
Van Cleave joined the Virginia Citizens Defense League in 1995, a year after it was founded. In June 2004, he received the Gun Rights Defender of the Month Award from the Citizens Committee for the Right to Keep and Bear Arms.

== Views ==
Van Cleave is a proponent of a strong interpretation of the Second Amendment to the United States Constitution, believing open access to guns guarantees that individual Americans have the right to defend themselves and, as he put it in 2004, "to take back your country should it ever become a totalitarian state". Although some other gun rights groups (such as the Citizens Committee for the Right to Keep and Bear Arms) have criticized the VCDL for having its members open carry en masse, Van Cleave has defended this practice, saying that it helps educate both citizens and the police about Virginia's gun laws. He has also defended the VCDL's advocacy for passing concealed carry laws that allow college students to carry guns on campus if they have a permit, saying after the Virginia Tech shooting, "If just one of those adult students had been armed in that building, there would have been a much better chance that somebody would have stopped the madman." In 2010, it was reported that he was pressuring Virginia lawmakers to legalize gun carrying and drinking among non-police officers as well as police officers, so long as they are not drunk while carrying the gun, arguing that "We're not allowed to drink, but they can. That's two classes of citizens."

Van Cleave has been interviewed on 60-Minutes, Nightline, the Washington Post, and a host of other places.

Van Cleave appeared on The Daily Show in 2013 for a segment about gun control in Australia. On the show, he was interviewed by John Oliver, and said of gun control that "At the end of the day, none of it works." He went on to say that the United States only had such high gun crime rates because it had so many guns, to which Oliver replied "That's my point."

== Sacha Baron Cohen interview ==
In 2018 Van Cleave appeared in a fake promotional pro-gun rights video advocating the arming of children and toddlers by Sacha Baron Cohen's Showtime spoof interview series, Who is America? Baron Cohen had disguised himself as an Israeli ex-Mossad agent and invited Van Cleave to Washington, D.C., to receive a "Friend of Israel" award in honor of Israel's 70th anniversary by a fictitious pro-Israel group created by Baron Cohen. In the segment Van Cleave endorses “Kinderguardians,” a phony program to teach and arm schoolchildren as young as three to protect themselves in the classroom. In the segment Van Cleave argued that, since children have not developed a conscience, "they would make very effective soldiers". Other notable pro-gun politicians were duped by the fake award into appearing in the segment, including former US Senate Majority Leader Trent Lott, former US congressman Joe Walsh, and former Chief Justice of the Alabama Supreme Court Roy Moore.
