= Stans (film) =

2025 documentary film

- Theatrical release poster
- Directed by: Steven Leckart
- Produced by: Antoine Fuqua; Eminem; Tony DiSanto; Stuart Parr; Paul Rosenberg
- Starring: Eminem
- Edited by: Marcella Serrano
- Music by: Julie Glaze Houlihan
- Production companies: MTV Entertainment Studios; Shady Films; DIGA Studios; Fuqua Films; AMC Theatres Distribution; Trafalgar Releasing
- Release dates: June 2, 2025 (London); August 7, 2025 (United States)
- Running time: 102 minutes
- Country: United States
- Language: English

Stans is a 2025 American documentary film that explores the career of rapper Eminem through his superfans.

The film premiered at the SXSW London Screen Festival on June 2, 2025. It had a limited run at AMC Theatres in the United States from August 7 to August 10. Outside of the US, Trafalgar Releasing will release the film at more than 1,600 theaters.

The film was accompanied by a soundtrack, Stans The Official Soundtrack, which features tracks that inspired the film as well as previously unreleased music.

== Cast ==
- Eminem
- Paul Rosenberg
- Ed Sheeran
- Adam Sandler
- Dr. Dre
- Jimmy Iovine
- LL Cool J
- Alex Kresovich
- Devon Sawa as Stan
- Jason Clay as The Real Slim Shady

== Release ==
Stans had a limited theatrical release on August 7, 2025. It was later released on the Paramount+ streaming service on August 26, 2025.

== Reception ==
On the review aggregator website Rotten Tomatoes, 90% of 21 critics' reviews are positive.

Adam Graham of The Detroit News gave the film a B and wrote, "Stans isn't the be-all, end-all telling of Eminem's tale, but it puts his stamp on it for now, using the lens of his fans to give it perspective."

== Soundtrack ==
Stans (The Official Soundtrack)

Soundtrack album by Eminem
- Released: August 26, 2025
- Genre: Hip-hop
- Length: 63:08
- Labels: Shady; Goliath; Aftermath; Interscope

Eminem chronology
The Death of Slim Shady (Coup de Grâce) (2024)	Stans (The Official Soundtrack) (2025)

The film's soundtrack was released on August 26, 2025. The song "Everybody's Looking at Me" was originally a freestyle performed by Eminem on the Funkmaster Flex radio show with rapper Proof, which was modified for the album, adding two more verses from Eminem and removing Proof's verse. The track was also heard in the background of "The Kiss (Skit)" off his 2002 album The Eminem Show. The track "Walk On Water (Original Version) is Vinyl exclusive.

No.	Title	Originally from	Length
1.	"Stan" (featuring Dido)	The Marshall Mathers LP (2000)	6:44
2.	"Bad Guy"	The Marshall Mathers LP 2 (2013)	7:14
3.	"Arose"	Revival (2017)	4:34
4.	"Beautiful"	Relapse (2009)	6:32
5.	"Not Afraid"	Recovery (2010)	4:08
6.	"Rap God"	The Marshall Mathers LP 2 (2013)	6:03
7.	"Stan" (Live at Wembley 2014)	Previously unreleased	3:48
8.	"Just Don't Give a Fuck" (Remix)	The Slim Shady LP (1999)	4:02
9.	"Say Goodbye Hollywood"	The Eminem Show (2002)	4:32
10.	"Everybody's Looking at Me"	Previously unreleased	4:54
11.	"Still Don't Give a Fuck"	The Slim Shady LP (1999)	4:17
12.	"Stan" (featuring Elton John) (Live at 43rd Grammy Awards)	Curtain Call: The Hits (2005)	6:20
Total length:			63:08

Vinyl Bonus Track
No.	Title	Information	Length
1.	"Walk on Water (Original Version)" (featuring Skylar Grey)	Alternate version of Walk on Water.	5:01
Total length:			68:09

=== Personnel for "Everybody's Looking at Me" ===
Credits adapted from Tidal.

- Marshall "Eminem" Mathers – songwriting
- Andre "Dr. Dre" Young – songwriting, production
- Kennedy "Rockwell" Gordy – songwriting
- Luis Resto – additional keyboard
- Mauricio "Veto" Iragorri – recording
- Richard "Segal" Huredia – recording, mixing
- Mike Strange – additional engineering
- Tony Campana – additional engineering

=== Charts ===
Chart performance for Stans (The Official Soundtrack)
Chart (2026)	Peak position
French Physical Albums (SNEP)	97
German Albums (Offizielle Top 100)	65
German Hip-Hop Albums (Offizielle Top 100)	12
Swiss Albums (Schweizer Hitparade)	67
UK Album Downloads (Official Charts)	52
UK R&B Albums (Official Charts)	10
UK Soundtrack Albums (Official Charts)	7
