= List of Eminem records and achievements =

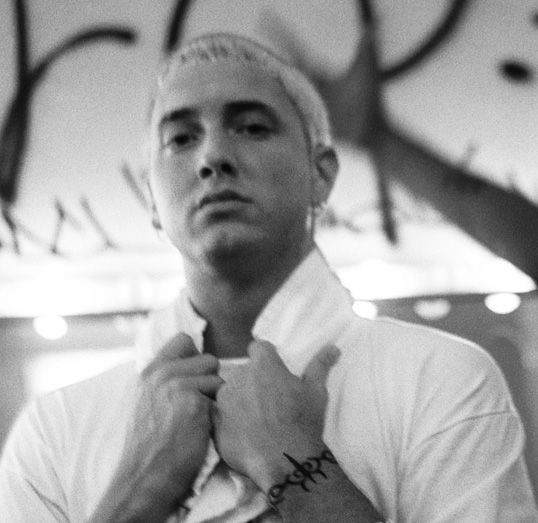
Eminem in 1999

Rapper Eminem holds many notable achievements, including 13 Guinness Book of World Records, for his videos, singles, albums, and rapping abilities.

Eminem's first appearance in the Guinness Book of World Records was in 2000 for being the "fastest-selling rap artist" with his album The Marshall Mathers LP. Since then, he has earned multiple appearances, 11 at least as of June 2024, including his record title as the top-selling hip hop artist of all time. Eminem is also a member of the Rock and Roll Hall of Fame, with his induction occurring in 2022. Eminem's best-known songs include "My Name Is", "The Real Slim Shady", "The Way I Am", "Stan", "Without Me", "Lose Yourself", "Mockingbird", "Not Afraid", "Love the Way You Lie", "Rap God", "The Monster", "Superman" and "Godzilla".

Eminem achieved mainstream popularity in 1999 with The Slim Shady LP. His next two releases, The Marshall Mathers LP (2000) and The Eminem Show (2002), were worldwide successes and were both nominated for the Grammy Award for Album of the Year. Eminem is among the best-selling music artists of all time, with estimated worldwide sales of over 220 million records. He was the best-selling music artist in the United States of the 2000s and the bestselling male music artist in the United States of the 2010s, third overall. Billboard named him the "Artist of the Decade (2000–2009)". He has had ten number 1 albums on the Billboard 200—which all consecutively debuted at number 1 on the chart, making him the first artist to achieve this—and five number 1 singles on the Billboard Hot 100. The Marshall Mathers LP, The Eminem Show, Curtain Call: The Hits (2005), "Lose Yourself", "Love the Way You Lie", and "Not Afraid" have all been certified Diamond or higher by the Recording Industry Association of America (RIAA). Rolling Stone has included him in its lists of the 100 Greatest Artists of All Time and the 100 Greatest Songwriters of All Time. He has won numerous awards, including 15 Grammy Awards, eight American Music Awards, 17 Billboard Music Awards, an Academy Award, a Primetime Emmy Award, and an MTV Europe Music Global Icon Award. In November 2022, Eminem was inducted into the Rock and Roll Hall of Fame.

== Worldwide ==
=== Guinness World Records ===
Year	Record holder	World Record	Ref.
2000	Eminem	Fastest selling rap artist	
2000	Eminem	Most consecutive albums to debut at number 1 in the US (11)	
2002	The Eminem Show	Best selling album of hip hop in the first week of the UK chart release	
2005	Eminem	Most successful rap artist in the UK	
2006	"Smack That"	Most entries jumped on US hot 100 chart	
2010	Eminem	21st century's top-selling album act (US)	
2010	Eminem	Most successive US albums to debut at No.1 by a solo artist	
2010	Eminem	Rapper with the most no.1 albums in the UK	
2010	Eminem	Most successive US No.1 albums by a solo artist	
2015	"Rap God"	Most words in a hit single	
2020	"Godzilla"	Fastest rap in a No.1 single	
2020	Eminem	Most likes for a musician on Facebook (male)	
2020	Eminem	Most consecutive No.1 debuts on the US albums chart	

=== Streaming ===
Record	Notes	Ref.
Most-streamed non-single on Spotify	"'Till I Collapse"	
Most albums to have over one billion streams on Spotify	11: The Slim Shady LP, The Marshall Mathers LP, The Eminem Show, Encore, Curtain Call: The Hits, Relapse, Recovery, The Marshall Mathers LP 2, Revival, Kamikaze, Music to Be Murdered By and The Death of Slim Shady (Coup de Grâce).	
First rapper to have 100M followers on Spotify		

=== Lists ===
Position	List	Ref.
83	Rolling Stone's 100 Greatest Artists of All Time	
91	Rolling Stone's 100 Greatest Songwriters of All Time	
5	The 10 Best Rappers of All Time	
2000 & 2002	The Best Rapper Alive, Every Year Since 1979	
1	Top 10 Best Rappers of All Time	
3	Ranking the 50 greatest rappers since 2000	
2	50 Greatest Hip-Hop Artists Of All-Time Ranked	

=== Honorific Nicknames ===
Title	Ref.
Slim Shady	
King of Hip-Hop	
King of Rap	
Rap God	

== United States ==
Record	Notes	Ref.
Best selling artist of the 2000s	Named "Artist of the Decade (2000–2009)" by Billboard.	
Best selling male music artist of the 2010s	Third overall.	
Best selling artist of the 21st century (pure sales)		
Best selling artist of the 3rd millennium (pure sales)		
Most albums that sold more than a million copies in the first week	3: The Marshall Mathers LP, The Eminem Show and Encore. Record tied with Taylor Swift.	
Hip Hop album with the highest first week sales	The Marshall Mathers LP: 1,760,000	
Hip Hop album with most diamond certified singles	2: Recovery	
Most-consecutive studio albums to debut at number one	11: The Marshall Mathers LP, The Eminem Show, Encore, Curtain Call: The Hits, Relapse, Recovery, The Marshall Mathers LP 2, Revival, Kamikaze, Music To Be Murdered By, and The Death of Slim Shady (Coup de Grâce)	
Hip-hop album with the most weeks in the Billboard 200	711: Curtain Call: The Hits	
Biggest spot jump from the week previous	196: Music To Be Murdered By	

=== Billboard 200 chart statistics ===
Eminem's number-one albums on the Billboard 200
1. 1990s: 0 albums (0.00%)
2. 2000s: 5 albums (45.5%)
3. 2010s: 4 albums (36.4%)
4. 2020s: 2 albums (18.2%)

Eminem has had 11 studio albums in the top 10 of the Billboard 200, 10 of them being No. 1. Two of Eminem's compilation albums, two collaborative albums and two soundtrack albums all charted in the top 10 as well, with Curtain Call: The Hits and the 8 Mile soundtrack reaching No. 1. As part of D12 he recorded two studio album as part of the group and as part of Bad Meets Evil him and Royce da 5'9" recorded an extended play all of which reached No 1. Eminem's debut studio album Infinite and debut extended play Slim Shady EP are his only albums to not chart on the Billboard 200.

Eminem has the second most consecutive number-one albums at ten behind Jay-Z who has eleven. In 2013 after the release of The Marshall Mathers LP 2 Eminem had 8 albums in the top 200 simultaneously. Eminem's albums The Marshall Mathers LP and The Eminem Show are among the top 100 certified albums according to the RIAA, with the albums becoming one of the best-selling albums in United States with diamond status.

Eminem's albums chart position in the United States
- 1996: Infinite N/A
- 1997: Slim Shady EP N/A
- 1999: The Slim Shady LP #2
- 2000: The Marshall Mathers LP #1
- 2001: Devil's Night (as D12) #1
- 2002: The Eminem Show #1
- 2002: 8 Mile: Music from and Inspired by the Motion Picture (as Shady Records) #1
- 2004: D12 World (as D12) #1
- 2004: Encore #1
- 2005: Curtain Call: The Hits #1
- 2006 Eminem Presents: The Re-Up (as Shady Records) #2
- 2009: Relapse #1
- 2010: Recovery #1
- 2011: Hell: The Sequel (as Bad Meets Evil) #1
- 2013: The Marshall Mathers LP 2 #1
- 2014: Shady XV (as Shady Records) #3
- 2015: Southpaw: Music from and Inspired by the Motion Picture (as Shady Records) #5
- 2017: Revival #1
- 2018: Kamikaze #1
- 2020: Music to Be Murdered By #1
- 2022: Curtain Call 2 #6
- 2024: The Death of Slim Shady (Coup de Grâce) #1

=== Billboard Hot 100 chart statistics ===
Eminem's number-one singles on the Billboard Hot 100
1. 1990s: 0 singles (0.00%)
2. 2000s: 2 singles (40.0%)
3. 2010s: 3 singles (60.0%)
4. 2020s: 0 singles (0.00%)

As of January 2025, Eminem has had 23 top-10 hits on the Billboard Hot 100, with 5 of them reaching number one. On the Billboard Hot 100, Eminem has charted a total of 112 songs, the eighth most for a rapper. (Note: Only below Drake (338), Future (218), Lil Wayne (187), Kanye West (161), Lil Baby (155), Nicki Minaj (149), and Travis Scott (120).) Eminem's singles "Lose Yourself", "Not Afraid" and "Love The Way You Lie" all peaked at number one on the Billboard Hot 100 and have been certified diamond or higher by the RIAA.

Eminem's top-ten singles in the United States
- 2002: "Lose Yourself" #1
- 2009: "Crack A Bottle" #1
- 2010: "Not Afraid" #1
- 2010: "Love The Way You Lie" #1
- 2013: "The Monster" #1
- 2002: "Without Me" #2
- 2006: "Smack That" #2
- 2024: "Houdini" #2
- 2013: "Berzerk" #3
- 2018: "Killshot" #3
- 2020: "Godzilla" #3
- 2000: "The Real Slim Shady" #4
- 2002: "Cleanin' Out My Closet" #4
- 2011: "I Need A Doctor" #4
- 2019: "Homicide" #5
- 2004: "Just Lose It" #6
- 2009: "Shake That" #6
- 2018: "Lucky You" #6
- 2013: "Rap God" #7
- 2005: "When I'm Gone" #8
- 2009: "Forever" #8
- 2018: "The Ringer" #8
- 2009: "We Made You" #9

=== Billboard Hot Rap Songs statistics ===
Eminem has had 32 top 10 hits on the Billboard Hot Rap Songs, with 6 of them reaching No. 1. on the Billboard Hot Rap Songs. In total 66 songs charted Billboard Hot Rap Songs.

Eminem's top-ten rap singles in the United States
- 2010: "Forever" #1
- 2010: "Love The Way You Lie" #1
- 2013: "Berzerk" #1
- 2013: "The Monster" #1
- 2013: "Rap God" #1
- 2024: "Houdini" #1
- 2002: "Lose Yourself" #2
- 2018: "Killshot" #2
- 2019: "Homicide" #2
- 2020: "Godzilla" #3
- 2009: "Crack A Bottle" #4
- 2013: "Survival" #4
- 2014: "Guts Over Fear" #4
- 1998: "Just Don't Give A Fuck" #5
- 2002: "Without Me" #5
- 2002: "Cleaning Out My Closet" #5
- 2012: "My Life" #5
- 2014: "Headlights" #5
- 2018: "River" #5
- 2018: "Lucky You" #5
- 2017: "Walk On Water" #6
- 2000: "The Real Slim Shady" #7
- 2004: "Just Lose It" #7
- 2017: "No Favours" #7
- 2018: "The Ringer" #7
- 2010: "Not Afraid" #8
- 2010: "No Love" #9
- 2015: "Phenomenal" #9
- 1999: "My Name Is" #10
- 2003: "Superman" #10
- 2005: "Mockingbird" #10
- 2018: "Fall" #10

== United Kingdom ==
=== UK Album Chart ===
Eminem has had eleven studio albums in the Top 10 of the Official Albums Chart, ten of them being No. 1. Eminem's compilation album, two collaborative albums and one of two soundtrack albums all charted in the Top 10 as well, with Curtain Call: The Hits and the 8 Mile soundtrack reaching No. 1. As part of D12 he recorded two albums, and as part of Bad Meets Evil him and Royce da 5'9" recorded an extended play, all of which reached the Top 10 with D12 World reaching No 1. Eminem's first full-length album, his first EP, and the Southpaw soundtrack are his only albums not to reach the Official Albums Chart. Eminem holds the record for the most consecutive number one albums in Official Albums Chart history at ten consecutive chart toppers.

Eminem's albums chart position in the United Kingdom
- 1996: Infinite N/A
- 1997: Slim Shady EP N/A
- 1999: The Slim Shady LP #10
- 2000: The Marshall Mathers LP #1
- 2001: Devil's Night (as D12) #2
- 2002: The Eminem Show #1
- 2002: 8 Mile: Music from and Inspired by the Motion Picture (as Shady Records) #1
- 2004: D12 World (as D12) #1
- 2004: Encore #1
- 2005: Curtain Call: The Hits #1
- 2006 Eminem Presents: The Re-Up (as Shady Records) #3
- 2009: Relapse #1
- 2010: Recovery #1
- 2011: Hell: The Sequel (as Bad Meets Evil) #7
- 2013: The Marshall Mathers LP 2 #1
- 2014: Shady XV (as Shady Records) #5
- 2015: Southpaw: Music from and Inspired by the Motion Picture (as Shady Records) N/A
- 2017: Revival #1
- 2018: Kamikaze #1
- 2020: Music to Be Murdered By #1
- 2024: The Death of Slim Shady (Coup de Grâce) #1

=== UK Singles Chart ===
Eminem has had thirty-four Top 10 hits on the UK Singles Chart, with eleven of them reaching No. 1.

Eminem's top-ten singles in the United Kingdom
- 1999: My Name Is #2
- 1999: "Guilty Conscience" #5
- 2000: "Forgot About Dre" #7
- 2000: "The Real Slim Shady" #1
- 2000: "The Way I Am" #8
- 2000: "Stan" #1
- 2002: "Without Me" #1
- 2002: "Cleanin' Out My Closet" #4
- 2002: "Lose Yourself" #1
- 2003: "Sing For The Moment" #6
- 2003: "Business" #6
- 2004: "Just Lose It" #1
- 2004: "Like Toy Soldiers" #1
- 2005: "Mockingbird" #4
- 2005: "Ass Like That" #4
- 2005: "When I'm Gone" #4
- 2006: "Smack That" #1
- 2009: "Crack A Bottle" #4
- 2009: "We Made You" #4
- 2010: "Not Afraid" #5
- 2010: "Love The Way You Lie" #2
- 2011: "I Need A Doctor" #8
- 2013: "My Life" #2
- 2013: "Berzerk" #2
- 2013: "Rap God" #5
- 2013: "The Monster" #1
- 2014: "Guts Over Fear" #10
- 2017: "Walk On Water" #7
- 2017: "River" #1
- 2018: "The Ringer #4
- 2018: "Lucky You" #6
- 2018: "Fall" #8
- 2020: "Godzilla" #1
- 2024: "Houdini" #1

== Canada ==
=== Billboard Canadian albums chart statistics ===
Eminem has had 10 studio albums in the top 10 of the Billboard Canadian albums chart, 9 of them being No. 1. Eminem's compilation album, two collaborative albums and two soundtrack albums all charted in the top 10 as well, with Curtain Call: The Hits, the 8 Mile soundtrack and Shady XV reaching No. 1. As part of D12 he recorded two studio album as part of the group and as part of Bad Meets Evil him and Royce da 5'9" recorded an extended play all of which reached No 1. Eminem's debut studio album Infinite and debut extended play Slim Shady EP are his only albums to not chart on the Billboard Canadian albums chart.

Eminem's albums chart position in the United States
- 1996: Infinite N/A
- 1997: Slim Shady EP N/A
- 1999: The Slim Shady LP #9
- 2000: The Marshall Mathers LP #1
- 2001: Devil's Night (as D12) #1
- 2002: The Eminem Show #1
- 2002: 8 Mile: Music from and Inspired by the Motion Picture (as Shady Records) #1
- 2004: D12 World (as D12) #1
- 2004: Encore #1
- 2005: Curtain Call: The Hits #1
- 2006 Eminem Presents: The Re-Up (as Shady Records) #2
- 2009: Relapse #1
- 2010: Recovery #1
- 2011: Hell: The Sequel (as Bad Meets Evil) #1
- 2013: The Marshall Mathers LP 2 #1
- 2014: Shady XV (as Shady Records) #1
- 2015: Southpaw: Music from and Inspired by the Motion Picture (as Shady Records) #2
- 2017: Revival #1
- 2018: Kamikaze #1
- 2020: Music to Be Murdered By #1

=== Billboard Canadian Hot 100 statistics ===
Eminem has had 3 top 10 hits on the Billboard Canadian Hot 100, with 1 of them reaching No. 1. In total 12 songs charted Billboard Canadian Hot 100.

Eminem's top-ten singles in Canada
- 2006: "Smack That" #2
- 2010: "Love The Way You Lie" #1
- 2013: "The Monster" #2
- 2024: "Houdini" #1

== See also ==
- List of awards and nominations received by Eminem
