= My Name Is =

1999 single by Eminem

Single by Eminem

from the album The Slim Shady LP
- Released: January 25, 1999
- Recorded: March–May 1998
- Genre: Comedy hip hop
- Length: 4:28
- Label: Aftermath; Interscope; Web
- Songwriters: Marshall Mathers; Andre Young; Labi Siffre
- Producer: Dr. Dre

Eminem singles chronology
"Just Don't Give a Fuck" (1998)	"My Name Is" (1999)	"Role Model" (1999)

Music videos
- "My Name Is" on YouTube; "My Name Is" (Dirty Version) on YouTube

"My Name Is" is the opening song and lead single of American rapper Eminem's second studio album The Slim Shady LP (1999). The song interpolates music from British singer Labi Siffre's 1975 track "I Got The..." featuring the bass and guitar riff as originally played by British pop rock duo Chas & Dave. The song was ranked at #26 on "VH1's 100 Greatest Songs of the '90s". "My Name Is" was also ranked #6 on Q Magazine's "1001 Best Songs Ever". "My Name Is" peaked at number 36 on the Billboard Hot 100, becoming Eminem's first top 40 hit on the chart. Outside of the United States, "My Name Is" peaked within the top ten of the charts in Iceland, Ireland, New Zealand, Norway, and United Kingdom.

The song was placed at number 39 by Rolling Stone on their list of "100 Greatest Hip-Hop songs of all time" in April 2016. The recording garnered Eminem his first Grammy Award for Best Rap Solo Performance at the 42nd Grammy Awards in 2000.

== Background ==
On the first day of recording, Eminem and Dr. Dre finished "My Name Is" in an hour.

The song contains an interpolation from Labi Siffre's track "I Got The..." from his 1975 album Remember My Song. Siffre, who is openly gay, said in a 2012 interview that he refused to approve the usage until certain sexist and homophobic lyrics were removed from the song: "Dissing the victims of bigotry – women as bitches, homosexuals as faggots – is lazy writing. Diss the bigots not their victims." The original uncensored version of the song with the aforementioned offending lyrics is mistakenly included on the compilation The Source Hip Hop Music Awards 1999 and some releases do have the original version intact. The bass and guitar riff used in the interpolation was originally performed by Siffre's session musicians Charles Hodges and David Peacock, who later became the duo Chas & Dave; the song's liner notes state the riff in "My Name Is" is an interpolation (re-recording). "My Name Is" is written in the key of F major with a tempo of 86 beats per minute. Famous names referenced in the song include Primus, Nine Inch Nails, the Spice Girls, Pamela Anderson (Pamela Lee), and Kris Kross (album version only).

== Music video ==
The video premiered on MTV Total Request Live on January 21, 1999. The video was co-directed by the song's producer and co-writer Dr. Dre and Philip G. Atwell, the latter of whom would later direct music videos for several other Eminem songs, including "The Real Slim Shady", "Stan", "Guilty Conscience", "Role Model", "Cleanin' Out My Closet" (all with Dre), "Lose Yourself" (with Eminem and Paul Rosenberg), "Sing for the Moment" (alongside Jeff Grippe), "Ass Like That", and "Just Lose It" (both solo). The video starts with a stereotypical redneck family watching television, who then come across a show starring "Marshall Mathers" (Eminem's real name). As the video goes on, Eminem parodies several TV shows and movies. He also imitates, among others, then-President of the United States Bill Clinton, Johnny Carson, Marilyn Manson, and a porn star. Basketball player Gheorghe Mureșan has a cameo appearance as a ventriloquist with Eminem being used as the dummy in the scene. Dre also has a cameo as a therapist. It also features a Monica Lewinsky lookalike, and Eminem imitating a chemistry teacher. Eminem is seen wearing a red tuxedo in some parts of the video, something that he would pay homage to in his 2020 single "Gnat", 21 years after "My Name Is" was originally released.

The video was ranked #71 in NME's 100 Greatest Music Videos.

== Critical reception ==
AllMusic's Stephen Thomas Erlewine singled out the song as an album highlight, while Entertainment Weekly's David Browne wrote that this single and its accompanying video were both "attention-grabbing".

== Track listing ==
UK CD1

No.	Title	Writer(s)	Producer(s)	Length
1.	"My Name Is" (clean)	Marshall Mathers; Andre Young; Labi Siffre	Dr. Dre	4:27
2.	"My Name Is" (explicit)	Mathers	Dr. Dre	4:27
3.	"My Name Is" (instrumental)	Mathers	Dr. Dre	5:58
Total length:				14:52

UK CD2

No.	Title	Writer(s)	Producer(s)	Length
1.	"My Name Is" (clean)	Marshall Mathers; Andre Young; Labi Siffre	Dr. Dre	4:27
2.	"My Name Is" (instrumental)	Mathers	Dr. Dre	4:27
3.	"Just Don't Give A" (clean version)	Mathers; Jeffrey Bass; Mark Bass	Bass Brothers; Eminem^{[a]}	4:02
Total length:				12:56

UK Cassette

No.	Title	Writer(s)	Producer(s)	Length
1.	"My Name Is" (clean)	Marshall Mathers; Andre Young; Labi Siffre	Dr. Dre	4:27
2.	"My Name Is" (instrumental)	Mathers	Dr. Dre	4:27
Total length:				8:54

12" single

No.	Title	Writer(s)	Producer(s)	Length
1.	"My Name Is" (explicit)	Marshall Mathers; Andre Young; Labi Siffre	Dr. Dre	4:30
2.	"My Name Is" (clean)	Mathers	Dr. Dre	4:29
3.	"My Name Is" (instrumental)	Mathers	Dr. Dre	4:29
4.	"My Name Is" (acapella)	Mathers	Dr. Dre	3:46
Total length:				17:14

Record Store Day 2020 7" single

No.	Title	Writer(s)	Producer(s)	Length
1.	"My Name Is"	Marshall Mathers; Andre Young; Labi Siffre	Dr. Dre	4:27
2.	"Bad Guys Always Die" (from the Wild Wild West soundtrack)	Mathers; Young	Dr. Dre	4:39
Total length:				9:06

Notes

- ^{^[a]} signifies a co-producer.

== Lawsuit ==
Eminem's mother Debbie Mathers filed a $10 million slander lawsuit against him for insinuating that she does drugs in the lyrics "99% of my life I was lied to, I just found out my mom does more dope than I do". Eminem also berates his mother in the third verse of the song, with the lyrics "When I was little I used to get so hungry I would throw fits/How you gonna breastfeed me, Mom?! You ain't got no tits!" Debbie stated in her 2008 book My Son Marshall, My Son Eminem, "This line was horrible and upsetting, because I'd contracted toxemia-blood poisoning when I gave birth to him and hadn't been able to breast-feed." The lawsuit was settled in 2001 for $25,000, of which Debbie received only $1,600, after Judge Mark Switalski ruled that $23,354.25 of the $25,000 settlement should go to Fred Gibson, Debbie's former attorney. Eminem would later reference this in his 2002 song "Without Me" with the lyrics, "I just settled all my lawsuits, fuck you Debbie!"

Eminem later felt disillusioned by its immense popularity. In 2002, he said "I didn't hate that song when I first made it. But the shit that I really, really like, that I put my heart and soul into, I don't get recognized for, like 'The Way I Am.' There's a difference between me being funny and me being real. I feel like I don't get recognized for my best shit — the shit that's my real, true feelings and emotions."

== Awards and nominations ==
Year	Ceremony	Award	Result
1999	MTV Video Music Awards	Best Male Video	Nominated
1999	MTV Video Music Awards	Best New Artist in a Video	Won
1999	MTV Video Music Awards	Best Direction in a Video	Nominated
2000	Grammy Awards	Best Rap Solo Performance	Won

== Charts ==
=== Weekly charts ===
Chart (1999)	Peak position
Australia (ARIA)	13
Austria (Ö3 Austria Top 40)	24
Belgium (Ultratop 50 Flanders)	33
Canada (RPM)	38
Denmark (IFPI)	13
France (SNEP)	68
Germany (Media Control AG)	37
Iceland (Íslenski Listinn Topp 40)	3
Ireland (IRMA)	4
Netherlands (Dutch Top 40)	12
Netherlands (Single Top 100)	17
New Zealand (RIANZ)	4
Norway (VG-lista)	8
Scottish Singles Sales (Official Charts)	5
Sweden (Sverigetopplistan)	16
Switzerland (Schweizer Hitparade)	29
UK Singles (Official Charts)	2
UK Hip Hop/R&B (Official Charts)	1
US Billboard Hot 100	36
US Alternative Airplay (Billboard)	37
US Hot R&B/Hip-Hop Songs (Billboard)	18
US Hot Rap Songs (Billboard)	10
US Pop Airplay (Billboard)	29

=== Year-end charts ===
Chart (1999)	Position
Australia (ARIA)	78
Netherlands (Dutch Top 40)	127
UK Singles (OCC)	41

== Certifications ==
Region	Certification	Certified units/sales
Australia (ARIA)	4× Platinum	280,000^{‡}
Denmark (IFPI Danmark)	Gold	45,000^{‡}
Italy (FIMI)	Gold	50,000^{‡}
New Zealand (RMNZ)	2× Platinum	60,000^{‡}
United Kingdom (BPI)	2× Platinum	1,200,000^{‡}
United States (RIAA)	3× Platinum	3,000,000^{‡}
^{‡} Sales+streaming figures based on certification alone.
