= Just Don't Give a Fuck =

Single by Eminem

from the EP Slim Shady EP and the album The Slim Shady LP
- B-side: "Brain Damage"
- Released: October 13, 1998
- Recorded: Late 1996 – 1997
- Studio: Bassmint Productions
- Genre: Hardcore hip hop; horrorcore
- Length: 4:07
- Label: Aftermath; Interscope; Web
- Songwriters: Marshall Mathers; Jeffrey Bass; Mark Bass
- Producers: Bass Brothers; Eminem (co.)

Eminem singles chronology
"Just Don't Give a Fuck" (1998)	"My Name Is" (1999)

Music video
- "Just Don't Give a F***" on YouTube

"Just Don't Give a Fuck" (known as "I Just Don't Give A", "Just Don't Give" or "Just Don't Give a F***" in the clean version) is the debut single by American rapper Eminem. The song was produced by Denaun Porter and appears as the only single on his only EP, the Slim Shady EP. A remix by the Bass Brothers appears on his second studio album, The Slim Shady LP. According to the book Angry Blonde, this was Eminem's first song as his alter ego "Slim Shady". "Just Don't Give a Fuck" ultimately became Eminem's first charting single, in November 1998, as it appeared on the Hot R&B/Hip-Hop Songs, Hot Rap Songs, and Bubbling Under Hot 100 charts.

Eminem recorded a sequel to the song entitled "Still Don't Give a Fuck", which also appears on The Slim Shady LP.

== Disses ==
In the second verse, Eminem disses various rappers such as Everlast, Miilkbone and Vanilla Ice, each of whom later released diss tracks against Eminem. Miilkbone released "Dear Slim" and "Presenting Miilkbone" and Vanilla Ice released "Exhale" and "Hip Hop Rules" in 2001 on his album Bi-Polar. Everlast had a long-lasting feud with Eminem. Although Eminem dissed Vanilla Ice in other tracks (such as "Marshall Mathers" and "Role Model"), he did not reply to either him or Miilkbone after their respective disses.

== Critical reception ==
Stephen Thomas Erlewine of Allmusic marked it as a stand out on The Slim Shady LP. RapReviews described the beat of the song as "head nodding" but felt that the remix was subpar, calling it "lifeless and oddly out of place among an album full of mostly dope cuts".

== Music video ==
The black-and-white video, interspersed with some color, is set in a trailer park in the summer. A variety of scenes, unrelated to each other, are shown, starting with a boy being stopped by a woman from taking food off a table. The boy returns as Eminem and strangles her. In one version, the video shows him beating her and throwing her on a bed. The video also includes scenes of people drinking and swimming in a pool. Additional scenes include aliens, a clown, and people eating watermelons.

The clean version of the accompanying music video for this single is known as "I Just Don't Give A".

This music video is Eminem's first music video.

== Track listing ==
US 12" Vinyl Single (Slim Shady EP)

Side A
No.	Title	Writer(s)	Producer(s)	Length
1.	"Just Don't Give a F*ck"	Marshall Mathers; Jeffrey Bass; Mark Bass	Bass Brothers; Eminem^{[a]}	4:00
2.	"Just Don't Give a #?@!" (radio edit)	Mathers; Denaun Porter	Denaun Porter	4:03
3.	"Just Don't Give a F*ck" (instrumental)	Mathers; J. Bass; M. Bass	Bass Brothers; Eminem^{[a]}	4:00
Total length:				12:03

Side B
No.	Title	Writer(s)	Producer(s)	Length
1.	"Low Down, Dirty"	Marshall Mathers; Denaun Porter; Von Carlisle	Da Brigade (Denaun Porter and Kuniva)	4:44
2.	"Just the Two of Us"	Mathers; Kevin Bell	DJ Head	4:58
3.	"Just Don't Give a F*ck" (acapella)	Marshall Mathers; Jeffrey Bass; Mark Bass	Bass Brothers; Eminem^{[a]}	4:00
Total length:				13:42

US CD Promo

No.	Title	Writer(s)	Producer(s)	Length
1.	"Just Don't Give a F***" (clean version)	Marshall Mathers; Jeffrey Bass; Mark Bass	Bass Brothers; Eminem^{[a]}	3:47

US CD Single / US Cassette Single

No.	Title	Writer(s)	Producer(s)	Length
1.	"Just Don't Give a F***" (album version)	Marshall Mathers; Jeffrey Bass; Mark Bass	Bass Brothers; Eminem^{[a]}	4:02
2.	"Brain Damage" (album version)	Mathers; J. Bass	Bass Brothers; Eminem^{[a]}	3:43
Total length:				7:45

US CD Maxi Single / US Cassette Maxi Single / US 12" Vinyl Promo

No.	Title	Writer(s)	Producer(s)	Length
1.	"Just Don't Give a F***" (album version)	Marshall Mathers; Jeffrey Bass; Mark Bass	Bass Brothers; Eminem^{[a]}	4:05
2.	"Just Don't Give a F***" (clean version)	Mathers; J. Bass; M. Bass	Bass Brothers; Eminem^{[a]}	3:47
3.	"Just Don't Give a F***" (instrumental)	Mathers; J. Bass; M. Bass	Bass Brothers; Eminem^{[a]}	3:33
4.	"Just Don't Give a F***" (acapella)	Mathers; J. Bass; M. Bass	Bass Brothers; Eminem^{[a]}	3:33
5.	"Brain Damage" (album version)	Mathers; J. Bass	Bass Brothers; Eminem^{[a]}	3:46
Total length:				23:12

US 12" Vinyl Single

No.	Title	Writer(s)	Producer(s)	Length
1.	"Just Don't Give a F***" (album version)	Marshall Mathers; Jeffrey Bass; Mark Bass	Bass Brothers; Eminem^{[a]}	4:05
2.	"Just Don't Give a F***" (clean version)	Mathers; J. Bass; M. Bass	Bass Brothers; Eminem^{[a]}	3:47
3.	"Just Don't Give a F***" (instrumental)	Mathers; J. Bass; M. Bass	Bass Brothers; Eminem^{[a]}	3:33
4.	"Just Don't Give a F***" (acapella)	Mathers; J. Bass; M. Bass	Bass Brothers; Eminem^{[a]}	3:33
Total length:				14:58

Notes

- ^{^[a]} signifies a co-producer.

== Charts ==
=== Weekly charts ===
Chart (1998–1999)	Peak position
US Bubbling Under Hot 100 (Billboard)	14
US Hot R&B/Hip-Hop Songs (Billboard)	62
US Hot Rap Songs (Billboard)	5

== Certifications ==
Certifications for "Just Don't Give a Fuck"
Region	Certification	Certified units/sales
Australia (ARIA)	Gold	35,000^{‡}
New Zealand (RMNZ)	Gold	15,000^{‡}
^{‡} Sales+streaming figures based on certification alone.
