= Angry Blonde =

Book by Eminem

- Author: Eminem
- Language: English
- Subject: Music
- Genre: Non-fiction
- Publisher: HarperEntertainment
- Publication date: November 21, 2000
- Publication place: United States
- Media type: Print
- Pages: 148
- ISBN: 0066209226
- Followed by: The Way I Am

Angry Blonde is a 2000 non-fiction book by American rapper Eminem. The book was first published on November 21, 2000 by HarperEntertainment and features Eminem's commentary of his songs as well as several pictures that had not been previously published. A paperback edition was released in 2002. The book was listed as one of the ALA's "Quick Picks for Reluctant Young Adult Readers" for 2002.

== Synopsis ==
In the book Eminem comments on songs that he wrote, almost solely on those that have received controversy for explicit lyrics. The songs' lyrics are listed in the work uncensored (leading to the book being sold with a Parental Advisory sticker), with Eminem's personal take on each one. Songs listed in the book include "Kim", "The Way I Am" and "The Real Slim Shady".

== Reception ==
Andrew Motion reviewed Angry Blonde, commenting "Such metaphorical life as his lines possess is always a prey to his rhymes, which (to put it mildly) sound lucky or opportunistic, rather than definite and resourceful" and that ultimately "writerly, he ain't." Third Way gave a similar opinion in their review of the book and were not overly impressed with the text.
