= Goliath Artists =

American management company and record label

Goliath Artists, Inc.
- Type: Private
- Industry: Talent and Literary Agencies
- Key people: Paul Rosenberg, (Chairman & CEO)

Goliath Artists is an American management company and record label founded by Shady Records president and co-founder Paul Rosenberg, based in New York City, New York and Detroit, Michigan.

== Management ==
=== Current artists ===
Act	Year signed	Label
Eminem	1999	Shady · Aftermath · Interscope
Danny Brown	2013	Warp

=== Former artists ===
- Action Bronson
- The Alchemist
- Blink-182
- Cypress Hill
- D12
- DJ AM
- DJ Muggs
- The Knux
- Soul Assassins
- Spark Master Tape
- TRV$DJAM
- Xzibit (2002–2004)

== Goliath Records ==
Goliath Records
- Parent company: Universal Music Group
- Founded: 2020
- Founder: Paul Rosenberg
- Distributor: Interscope Records
- Genre: Hip hop
- Country of origin: United States
- Location: New York City, New York; Detroit, Michigan

=== History ===
On February 21, 2020, it was reported that Paul Rosenberg was stepping down from Def Jam Recordings as chairman and CEO to focus his time operating Shady Records, Goliath Artists, and his new venture Goliath Records. The following year, he announced his first signee on the Goliath Records roster, Indiana rapper Vince Ash and released his deluxe version of VITO through Interscope.

=== Current artists ===
Act	Year signed	Releases under the label
Vince Ash	2021	1

== Discography ==
Artist	Album	Details
Vince Ash	VITO (Deluxe Edition)	Label: Goliath, Interscope; Formats: CD, digital download; Released: April 16, 2021
