= Slim Shady EP =

EP by Eminem
- Released: December 10, 1997
- Recorded: 1997
- Studio: Studio 8 (Ferndale, Michigan)
- Genres: Hip-hop; horrorcore
- Length: 28:33
- Label: WEB
- Producers: Bass Brothers; DJ Head; DJ Rec; Denaun Porter; Eminem; Kuniva

Eminem chronology
Infinite (1996)	Slim Shady EP (1997)	The Slim Shady LP (1999)

Singles from Slim Shady EP
- 1. "Just Don't Give a Fuck" Released: October 13, 1998

Slim Shady EP is the first extended play by the American rapper Eminem, released on December 10, 1997, through WEB Entertainment. Unlike his debut album Infinite (1996), the Slim Shady EP helped Eminem gain the interest of CEO Jimmy Iovine (co-founder of Interscope Records) and the West Coast rapper and producer Dr. Dre, who subsequently signed Eminem to his Aftermath Entertainment record label, and served as executive producer on his first major-label album, The Slim Shady LP (1999).

The EP introduces Eminem's alter ego Slim Shady. Since the EP was released before he was signed to Interscope and Aftermath, original copies are now highly valued. His lyrics are a marked departure from those found on Infinite, featuring constant references to drug use, sexual acts, mental instability, and over-the-top violence. Another departure was his exploration of more serious themes of dealing with poverty, his direct and self-deprecating response to criticism, and of marital and family difficulties. His flow is also noticeably different from Infinite where critics claimed he sounded too much like Nas and AZ. The production value of the music on the tracks—from previous collaborators DJ Head, the Bass Brothers, and Mr. Porter—was noticeably higher than previous efforts. According to Billboard, at this point in his life Eminem had "realized his musical ambitions were the only way to escape his unhappy life".

== Background and production ==
In 1996, his debut album Infinite, which was recorded at the Bassmint, a recording studio owned by the Bass Brothers, was released under their independent label WEB Entertainment. Infinite achieved little commercial success and was largely ignored by Detroit radio stations, such as WJLB (97.9 FM in Detroit), and in specific tracks Eminem raps explicitly about this problem, like in "Just Don't Give a Fuck" "If I Had" and "Low Down, Dirty". The disappointment from this experience greatly influenced his lyrical style: "After that record, every rhyme I wrote got angrier and angrier. A lot of it was because of the feedback I got. Motherfuckers was like, 'You're a white boy, what the fuck are you rapping for? Why don't you go into rock & roll?' All that type of shit started pissing me off." After the release of Infinite, Eminem's personal struggles and abuse of drugs and alcohol culminated in a suicide attempt: all these troubles became main themes of Slim Shady EP.

The disappointment of Infinite inspired Eminem to create the alter ego Slim Shady: "Boom, the name hit me, and right away I thought of all these words to rhyme with it". Slim Shady served as Eminem's vent for his frustrations, and he released the horrorcore extended play entitled Slim Shady EP simultaneously on cassette, vinyl, and CD. During this time, Eminem and his wife Kim Scott lived in a high-crime neighborhood with their newborn daughter Hailie, where their house was burglarized numerous times. After being evicted from his home, Eminem traveled to Los Angeles to participate in the Rap Olympics, an annual nationwide rap battle competition. He placed second, and the staff at Interscope Records who attended the Rap Olympics sent a copy of the Slim Shady EP to company CEO Jimmy Iovine. Iovine played the tape for record producer Dr. Dre, founder of Aftermath Entertainment. Dr. Dre recalled, "In my entire career in the music industry, I have never found anything from a demo tape or a CD. When Jimmy played this, I said, 'Find him. Now.'" Eminem and Dr. Dre subsequently began work on his first major-label album The Slim Shady LP.

== Artwork ==
The cover depicts the opening intro as well as the first track, in which Slim Shady awakens Eminem and orders him to look in the mirror to see that he is "nothing without him". Eminem resists and screams in the background while Slim Shady yells back and laughs at Eminem's horror. By the second track, Eminem and Slim Shady become the same person. Additionally, the sound of glass breaking is heard, alluding once again to the cover.

== Release and reception ==
According to an interview with Zane Lowe, Eminem made 500 copies of the EP, but sold only slightly more than 250. WEB Entertainment initially released a single of "Just Don't Give a Fuck" in promotion of the EP, albeit in limited numbers and a limited reach. Nearly a year later, when Eminem signed with Interscope Records, the label re-released "Just Don't Give a Fuck". The reissued single became Eminem's first charting single, peaking at No. 62 on the Hot R&B/Hip-Hop Songs chart, at No. 5 on the Hot Rap Songs chart, and at No. 14 on the Bubbling Under Hot 100 chart (all in November 1998).

Professional ratings
Review scores
Source	Rating
AllMusic	2.5/5 stars

Though rare, reviews of the EP were generally mixed to positive. AllMusic gave the EP two and a half out of five stars without a written review. XXL, despite originally giving the EP three out of five stars "L" rating, listed it on their "100 Most Essential Rap EPs of All Time – The Best of the Short & Sweet" list. Eminem was featured in the March 1998 edition of The Source magazine's (#102), "Unsigned Hype" column. The author of the column highlighted two tracks from Eminem's Slim Shady EP: "Just the Two of Us", and "Murder, Murder".

== Track listing ==
No.	Title	Producer(s)	Length
1.	"Intro (Slim Shady)"	Eminem	1:05
2.	"Low Down, Dirty"	Denaun Porter; Kuniva	4:44
3.	"If I Had..."	DJ Rec	4:03
4.	"Just Don't Give a Fuck"	Denaun Porter	4:04
5.	"Mommy" (skit)		0:39
6.	"Just the Two of Us"	DJ Head	4:20
7.	"No One's Iller" (featuring Swifty McVay, Bizarre and Fuzz Scoota)	DJ Head	4:58
8.	"Murder, Murder"	DJ Rec	4:40
Total length:			28:33

Bonus tracks
No.	Title	Producer(s)	Length
9.	"If I Had..." (radio edit)	DJ Rec	4:01
10.	"Just Don't Give a Fuck" (radio edit)	Denaun Porter	4:03
Total length:			36:36
