= Paul Rosenberg (manager) =

American music manager

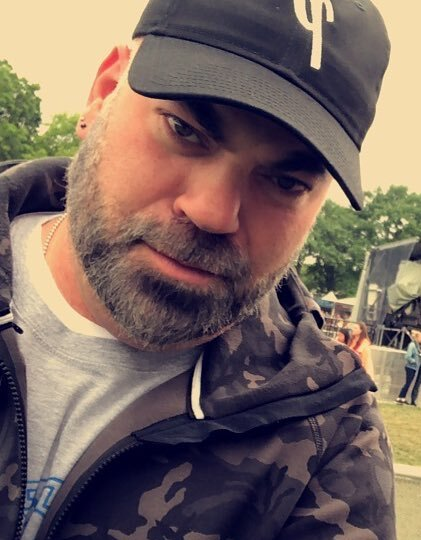
- Rosenberg in 2018

Background information
- Born: August 1, 1971 (age 55)
- Origin: Detroit, Michigan, U.S.
- Genre: Hip hop
- Occupations: Music manager; entertainment attorney
- Years active: 1997–present
- Labels: Shady; Goliath (current); Def Jam (former)
- Spouse: Allison Trudell

Paul Rosenberg (born August 1, 1971) is an American talent manager and former entertainment attorney from Detroit, Michigan. He is best known for being the manager of Eminem, and later Danny Brown.

He founded Goliath Artists in the late 1990s, through which he signed and managed fellow-Detroiter and rapper Eminem. He is also the co-founder and former president of Shady Records, a subsidiary of Interscope Records, which signed artists including Obie Trice, 50 Cent, D12, Yelawolf, Westside Boogie, and Griselda, amongst others. From January 2018 to early 2020, he served as chairman and chief executive officer of Def Jam Recordings.

Rosenberg is also known for his associations with Cypress Hill, DJ Muggs, Soul Assassins, Xzibit, the Alchemist, the Knux, DJ AM, Action Bronson, and Blink-182, amongst others.

== Career ==
In 1996, Rosenberg formed Goliath Artists, a talent management company. It was also how he met Eminem the following year, agreeing to not only be his manager, but also his lawyer. Their friendship began during the development of his 1997 extended play, Slim Shady EP.

=== "Paul" skits ===
Since 1999's Slim Shady LP, he has voiced over skits eponymously titled after him on most Eminem albums. The skits portray Rosenberg fictionally as a character concerned with the particular record, advising his client on steps to take and often ordering him to either "tone down" the lyrics or scrap the album completely. He, along with Eminem, co-wrote all skits on 2009's Relapse, and he has also performed a skit on Xzibit's album Man vs. Machine (2002).

=== Shady Records ===
The success of the Slim Shady LP granted Eminem his own record label, which he called Shady Records, founded in late-August 1999. He recruited Rosenberg to be the label's co-founder which he accepted. Shady's first artist signing was in 2000, when it signed Eminem's group, D12. Through the help of group members Bizarre and Proof, Rosenberg agreed to sign Obie Trice to the label after he appeared on a Devil's Night freestyle skit named after him. After being affiliated throughout 2000, Trice joined Shady in late 2001.

After D12 and Obie Trice, Rosenberg acquired a mixtape from Violator Management co-founder Chris Lighty and Eminem's attorney, Theo Sedlmayr, which apparently would end up being Guess Who's Back? (2002), a mixtape compiled of unreleased tracks, newly recorded content and past radio freestyles recorded by 50 Cent. Rosenberg, Eminem and Dr. Dre agreed to sign 50 Cent to a five-album joint venture deal with Shady, Aftermath Entertainment, G-Unit Records and Interscope Records. His February 6, 2003, debut, Get Rich or Die Tryin', went to sell over 20 million copies worldwide and become the highest performing album of that year.

In 2010, after losing rapper Stat Quo from its roster, Rosenberg signed Yelawolf and rap group Slaughterhouse (consisting of Royce da 5'9", KXNG Crooked, Joe Budden and Joell Ortiz) to the Shady imprint; the signing of Slaughterhouse also reunited member Royce da 5'9" with Eminem after a ten-year dispute between the two which involved D12 and furthermore recruited their rap duo, Bad Meets Evil.

Rosenberg was also instrumental in co-executively producing the Shady compilations, Eminem Presents: The Re-Up (2006), the fifteenth anniversary compilation Shady XV (2014), and the label's two soundtracks to the 2002 film, 8 Mile, which included Eminem's Oscar-winning theme song, "Lose Yourself", and the 2015 boxing drama, Southpaw, which starred Jake Gyllenhaal; both films, along with 2005's Get Rich or Die Tryin' and 2017's Bodied, were all produced by Rosenberg.

=== Def Jam Recordings presidency ===
In November 2017, as Def Jam Recordings fended off from their involvement with co-founder Russell Simmons due to sexual misconduct accusations against him, the label announced Rosenberg as its chairman and CEO, thus replacing Steve Bartels, who had been a part of Def Jam solely, following the April Fools' Day 2014 separation of the Island Def Jam Music Group.

On New Year's Day 2018, he was officially appointed the dual position. After two years and one month, Rosenberg announced, on February 21, 2020, that he had stepped down from his dual position at Def Jam and negotiated with Sir Lucian Grainge, chairman and CEO of Def Jam, Shady and Interscope's parent company, the Universal Music Group, to work on a creation of a new record label in a 50-50 joint venture with Universal.

=== Goliath ===
Since 1996 (as mentioned above), Rosenberg is the founder and CEO of Goliath Artists. Besides Eminem, he also managed other breakout or underground acts that include DJ AM, the Knux, Action Bronson, Blink-182, Xzibit, Spark Master Tape, The Alchemist and as of 2013, Danny Brown.

In 2020, after departing from Def Jam, Rosenberg reunited with Universal Music and created a joint venture limited partnership called Goliath Records. The label division is also used a spinoff division of the management firm. Its first official label signing was in February 2021, when it signed rapper Vince Ash to the label in conjunction with Interscope Records. The deal wasn't made public until the re-release of Ash's mixtape, VITO, on April 16.

=== Other ventures ===
==== Shade 45 and Paul Pod ====
Rosenberg was a co-producer for Eminem's hip-hop radio station Shade 45, which airs on SiriusXM. Through Shade 45, he (since December 2021) hosts a weekly podcast called the Paul Pod, which airs one episode per week. From August 1 to September 14, in promotion for Eminem's second greatest hits album, Curtain Call 2, Paul Pod aired a seven-episode edition.

==== Business and general management ====
Rosenberg was affiliated with Lawrence Vavra, having been the co-owner of his company, DECKSTAR, since its foundation in 2006. The company merged with British business management company James Grant Group through a $12 million agreement in 2017.

He was also the general manager of Steve Aoki's label, Dim Mak Records, throughout 2012.

==== Television and film production ====
Rosenberg was the executive producer and creative director of the Slim Shady Show (internet 2000; DVD 2001). He also made cameo voice roles on certain episodes. He later produced Eminem's autobiographical film, 8 Mile (2002). This was followed up by the production of two DVD-exclusive concert films, Eminem: All Access Europe (2002) and Eminem Presents: The Anger Management Tour (2005).

In 2003, Rosenberg and Interscope Records co-founder Jimmy Iovine were the executive producers of the Showtime reality competition docu-series, The Next Episode. He then (along with Iovine, Chris Lighty and director Jim Sheridan) produced 50 Cent's acting debut, Get Rich or Die Tryin' (2005). Other executive productions from Rosenberg include the television series, Gone Too Far, which premiered on MTV October 8, 2009, less than two months after the death of his client and the show's host, DJ AM. It adds up to A Different Spin with Mark Hoppus (Fuse 2010-12), Detroit Rubber (YouTube 2013), Road to Total Slaughter (2014), the Jake Gyllenhaal boxing drama Southpaw (2015; produced in association with Bob and Harvey Weinstein of the Weinstein Company). With the co-founding by Rosenberg and Eminem of Shady Films, a film production division of Shady Records, the first Shady filming production under the label was Total Slaughter, a rap battle pay-per-view event, which premiered on July 12, 2014. The decline of pay-per-view caused by premium media streaming caused the event to be cancelled in 2018, around the same time media speculation surfaced of Eminem building a rap league inspired by Total Slaughter. A documentary in relation was also premiered at film festivals in August 2015. After the failure of the event, Shady Films produced the record label documentary, Not Afraid: The Shady Records Story (2015).

In 2016, he produced the biopic, Nina, centering on jazz singer and pianist Nina Simone, controversially portrayed by Zoe Saldaña. Since then, Saldaña has expressed regret for portraying Simone in the film. Also in 2016, he and his former client, Action Bronson, in partnership with Vice Media created the TV series, Fuck, That's Delicious, for which Rosenberg acts as the executive producer. The show first premiered on Vice (then known as Viceland) on March 3. Viceland's renaming to Vice and the COVID-19 pandemic caused the series to be cancelled on July 20, 2020, before moving to YouTube on March 17, 2021.

Rosenberg and Eminem produced the comedy-drama, Bodied, starring Calum Worthy. The film premiered in 2017 via YouTube Premium. He also produced the Danny Brown concert documentary, Danny Brown: Live at the Majestic (2018). His first production in virtual reality was in early 2019 with the premiere of the Sundance exclusive, Marshall from Detroit, another Eminem documentary film; hosted by Sway Calloway. Rosenberg, Loud Records founder Steve Rifkind and Music Box executive producer Bill Simmons jointly produced the DMX HBO Max documentary, Don't Try to Understand, which premiered on November 25, 2021, two days after its premiere at Doc NYC and seven months after DMX's death. He then became the executive producer and creative director of the Metaverse special performance of Eminem and Snoop Dogg's single, "From the D 2 the LBC", as shown at the 2022 MTV Video Music Awards. As recent as November 2022, Rosenberg has executively produced the Def Jam documentary film, Mixtape, directed by Omar Acosta.

==== Clothing ====
In 2002, Rosenberg and Eminem co-formed their fashion line Shady Limited. The brand was discontinued in 2006 due to the impact of Eminem's prescription drug addiction.

==== On-screen appearances ====
Rosenberg made a cameo appearance in the music video for Eminem's single, "Berzerk" (2013). Then, he appeared on the HBO documentary miniseries The Defiant Ones, which centers around the partnership between Dr. Dre and Jimmy Iovine; the documentary premiered in mid-July 2017.

He also made a surprise appearance through social media, supporting 50 Cent's January 30, 2020 star induction into the Hollywood Walk of Fame. He also made an appearance for Dr. Dre's induction on March 19, 2024.

== Personal life ==
Rosenberg is Jewish. Since 2006, Rosenberg has been a resident of Alpine, New Jersey.
