= Rapture Tour =

2014 concert tour by Eminem

- Tour by Eminem
- Location: Oceania • Africa • Europe
- Associated album: The Marshall Mathers LP 2
- Start date: February 15, 2014
- End date: July 12, 2014
- Legs: 1
- No. of shows: 8
- Box office: $37,941,412

Eminem concert chronology
- The Home & Home Tour (2010); Rapture Tour (2014); The Monster Tour (2014)

The Rapture Tour was a concert tour by American rapper Eminem put together by Australian promoters - TEG Dainty. It was launched in support of his eighth studio album, The Marshall Mathers LP 2 (2013). Initial shows were announced in Australia and New Zealand on October 22, 2013. Eminem was accompanied on the tour by Kendrick Lamar, J. Cole, Jacob Linsley and Action Bronson. On the Oceania dates he was also accompanied by local rappers 360 and David Dallas. In 8 shows (including two dates at Wembley Stadium), Eminem sold over 315,000 tickets.

== Critical reception ==
Darren Levin of The Guardian gave a positive review, calling the show a "half-day showcase of top-notch hip-hop talent" and commenting that Eminem has "lost none of the potency that made him such a revelation to teenagers coming of age in the early-2000s". Chris Schulz from The New Zealand Herald felt the show was "a breathless, exhilarating and seriously loud show from start to finish", though complained about 360's "ridiculous Aussie rave-rap". Michael Dwyer of The Canberra Times gave the show 3 1/2 out of 5 stars, praising Eminem's ability to remain "brilliantly in character" throughout his career.

== Shows ==
List of concerts, showing date, city, country, venue, opening act, tickets sold, number of available tickets and amount of gross revenue
Date	City	Country	Venue	Attendance	Revenue
Oceania
February 15, 2014	Auckland	New Zealand	Western Springs Stadium	52,444 / 52,444	$6,838,988
February 19, 2014	Melbourne	Australia	Etihad Stadium	51,335 / 51,335	$7,034,160
February 20, 2014	Brisbane	Australia	Suncorp Stadium	43,927 / 43,927	$5,643,915
February 22, 2014	Sydney	Australia	ANZ Stadium	53,649 / 53,649	$6,937,910
Africa
February 26, 2014	Cape Town	South Africa	Cape Town Stadium	37,825 / 42,366	$1,939,801
March 1, 2014	Johannesburg	South Africa	Ellis Park Stadium	51,787 / 53,122	$3,546,638
Europe
July 11, 2014	London	England	Wembley Stadium	90,000 / 90,000	$6,000,000
July 12, 2014	London	England	Wembley Stadium	90,000 / 90,000	$6,000,000
