= My Son Marshall, My Son Eminem =

2007 autobiography by Debbie Nelson

- Author: Debbie Nelson
- Language: English
- Subject: Autobiography
- Genre: Non-fiction
- Publisher: Phoenix Books
- Publication date: 2007
- Publication place: United States
- Media type: Print (hardcover)
- ISBN: 1-59777-596-7

My Son Marshall, My Son Eminem is a 2007 autobiography by Debbie Nelson, the mother of American rapper Marshall Mathers, also known as Eminem. The British author Annette Witheridge helped her with the book. It was reported in September 2008 that the book sold over 100,000 copies in the United Kingdom.

== Description ==
It includes all of Nelson's life, and includes her troubles with Eminem growing up and dealing with fame. According to her, Eminem's side of the story is full of lies he concocted in order to become a successful rapper. Nevertheless, she says that she is not angry at her son. She also says in her book that she sued her son in 2000 for defamation to stop the foreclosure on her house.

Nelson's aim in writing the book was to show her side of the story about her relationship with Eminem. She stated that she "regrets keeping quiet as Em cultivated his public persona of a trailer dweller with a crazy welfare mom."

The book has photographs of Nelson with Eminem, and poems and lyrics written by Eminem that were rarely or never seen before.

== Legal ==
Nelson was sued a week before the book was released in the United States. According to Neal Alpert, Nelson was under contract to him and he should have received 25 percent of the profit. Nelson later got engaged to Alpert. The lawsuit was dismissed the following year.

== Reception ==
Nathan Rabin of The A.V. Club said that her book "is almost perversely devoid of the irony, humor and self-deprecation that pervades her son's music." A Publishers Weekly review says that "[t]hough readers may find it hard to reconcile Debbie's claim never to have exploited her son in the pages of a tell-all about him, Nelson's portrait of her son is tense but sympathetic."

Mike Sweeney of New Statesman listed the book among five of the most controversial memoirs.
