= The Way I Am (Eminem song) =

2000 single by Eminem

Single by Eminem

from the album The Marshall Mathers LP
- Released: October 3, 2000
- Recorded: March 2000
- Genre: Hardcore hip-hop
- Length: 4:50
- Label: Aftermath; Interscope; Web
- Songwriter: Marshall Mathers
- Producer: Eminem

Eminem singles chronology
| "The Real Slim Shady" (2000) | "The Way I Am" (2000) | "Stan" (2000) |

Music video
- "The Way I Am" on YouTube

"The Way I Am" is a song written, produced, and performed by American rapper Eminem from his third album The Marshall Mathers LP (2000). It was released as the second single from the album on October 3, 2000, later being featured on his 2005 compilation album, Curtain Call: The Hits. In the tradition of most of Eminem's follow-up singles, "The Way I Am" is one of the rare songs for which he has sole songwriting credit. It features a much darker and more emotionally driven sound than the album's lead single "The Real Slim Shady". "The Way I Am" peaked at number 58 on the Billboard Hot 100. Outside the United States, "The Way I Am" peaked within the top ten of the charts in Belgium (Wallonia), Finland, Netherlands, Ireland, Sweden, and the United Kingdom.

== Background ==
The song was written by Eminem to express the negative side of the fame that he had gained. The song makes points such as him not being able to go out in public and live a normal life due to him being harassed by fans. He also vents about the pressure put on him to top his earlier work on The Slim Shady LP. The line, "If I wasn't then why would I say I am" was taken from the song "As the Rhyme Goes On" by Eric B. & Rakim from their album Paid in Full. The song has also been remixed by Danny Lohner featuring Marilyn Manson, who has performed the song with Eminem live on stage. "The Way I Am" was certified Gold in Sweden, selling over 20,000 copies. The lyrics "When a dude's getting bullied and shoots up his school / And they blame it on Marilyn (On Marilyn) / And the heroin / Where were the parents at? (Parents at?) / And look where it's at! / Middle America, now it's a tragedy / Now it's so sad to see, an upper-class city / Having this happening," refer to the Columbine High School massacre with Eric Harris and Dylan Klebold.

In 2008, Eminem released a second autobiography titled The Way I Am.

== Critical reception ==
The song received critical acclaim. Aspects lauded were the vocal delivery, rhyme pattern, production and political material covered. Cynthia Fuchs of PopMatters was positive: "In 'The Way I Am', Eminem expounds, 'Since birth I've been cursed with this curse to just curse / And just blurt this berserk and bizarre shit that works / And it sells and it helps in itself to relieve / All this tension, dispensin' these sentences.' So there it is: he's performing therapy." AllMusic highlighted the song. Sputnikmusic described this song as "Amityville's portrayal of the Detroit he grew up in; 'The Way I Am' as a whole". Same critic listed it in Recommended Downloads and praising the single: "Built over doomy, gothic arpeggios, rumbling bass, and church bells, Eminem lays down one of the most perfectly formed lyrics of his career, weaving in and out of a tight rhyme scheme that echoes the loping piano motif. Interesting aside: this is one of the first Eminem songs that gives him 100% of the writing credits." IGN praised the song: "Eminem is an angry ass white boy and the vitriol continues on 'The Way I Am', in which he soundly states 'I am whatever you say I am / If I wasn't why would I say I am?' And when he complains that he's 'so sick and tired of being admired...', one almost believes that he'll hang up the mic and disappear (but Em obviously loves the attention so that's not an option at this point in the game). The throbbing, tubular bell and piano laced beat only add to the intensity of the track (incidentally it was crafted by Em himself and it's one of the more stellar examples of his often hit or miss production techniques)." Sal Cinquemani called this song: "He (Eminem) revels in the fact that there's teen violence in upper-class cities on the epic 'The Way I Am'". The song was named the 35th Best Song of the decade by the magazine Complex. The same magazine, in April 2011, ranked the song at #3 on their 100 Best Eminem Songs list.

== Music video ==
The music video at the beginning plays an instrumental of Eminem's song "Kim". After the "Kim" instrumental is played, the song carries on as normal and when the song starts, it shows Eminem about to jump out of the window of a tall building. He jumps and falls through the sky in a sequence inspired by the Coen brothers film The Hudsucker Proxy, in which the hero also falls slowly from a skyscraper window. Marilyn Manson appears behind Eminem when the song refers to him — and a few more times thereafter. Other shots show fans coming up to Eminem, asking for his autograph. Eminem and Manson were accused of being one of the causes of the Columbine High School massacre because of their violent lyrics. The rapper refuted these accusations by saying in "The Way I Am" that it is up to parents to raise their children. Manson was invited by Eminem to participate in the music video. Manson also performed the song live with Eminem. The scene when Eminem throws a chair at his The Slim Shady LP platinum plaque was inspired by the pressure he felt by his label to write a hit as the first single for The Marshall Mathers LP. In the video, Proof is in the scene when Eminem holds a radio interview and flips the DJ off. The little boy who asks for Eminem's photo in the public bathroom is his half-brother, Nathan. It was released by Paul Hunter as well as Eminem in his neighborhood in front of his old house, the same house that is depicted on the cover of The Marshall Mathers LP. At the end of the video, when Eminem hits the ground, he bounces off it safely, as if it is a giant mattress.

The video was named the 19th Best Music Video of the 2000s by Complex magazine. In the music video version of the song, wind sound effects can be heard when Eminem sings the intro, the first & last chorus. This can't be heard in the album version.

== Credits ==
- Singing and lyrics : Eminem
- Production : Eminem
- Mixing : Eminem
- Guitar and bass : Mike Elizondo
- Keyboard : Mike Elizondo, Tommy Coster
- Composer : Eminem
- Executive Producer : Dr. Dre
- Producer Video : Nina Huang Fan
- Director : Paul Hunter
- Appearances in the clip: Marilyn Manson, Proof, Nathan Mathers

== Track listing ==
UK CD single

| No. | Title | Writer(s) | Producer(s) | Length |
|---|---|---|---|---|
| 1. | "The Way I Am" | Marshall Mathers | Eminem | 4:50 |
| 2. | "Bad Influence" | Mathers; Jeffrey Bass; Mark Bass | Bass Brothers | 3:40 |
| 3. | "My Fault" (pizza mix) | Mathers; J. Bass; M. Bass | Bass Brothers; Eminem | 3:54 |
| 4. | "The Way I Am" (video) | | | 4:52 |
| Total length: | | | | 17:16 |

UK Cassette

| No. | Title | Writer(s) | Producer(s) | Length |
|---|---|---|---|---|
| 1. | "The Way I Am" | Marshall Mathers | Eminem | 4:50 |
| 2. | "Bad Influence" | Mathers; Jeffrey Bass; Mark Bass | Bass Brothers | 3:40 |
| Total length: | | | | 8:30 |

Australian CD single

| No. | Title | Writer(s) | Producer(s) | Length |
|---|---|---|---|---|
| 1. | "The Way I Am" (unedited version) | Marshall Mathers | Eminem | 4:50 |
| 2. | "The Way I Am" (clean) | Mathers | Eminem | 4:49 |
| 3. | "The Kids" (uncensored version) | Mathers; Jeffrey Bass; Mark Bass | Bass Brothers; Eminem | 5:07 |
| 4. | "'97 Bonnie & Clyde" | Mathers; J. Bass; M. Bass | Bass Brothers; Eminem^{[a]} | 5:17 |
| 5. | "Steve Berman" (skit) | Mathers | | 0:56 |
| 6. | "The Real Slim Shady" (video) | | | 4:44 |
| Total length: | | | | 25:43 |

Notes

- ^{^[a]} signifies a co-producer.

== Charts ==
=== Weekly charts ===
| Chart (2000) | Peak position |
|---|---|
| Australia (ARIA) | 34 |
| Austria (Ö3 Austria Top 40) | 11 |
| Belgium (Ultratop 50 Flanders) | 16 |
| Belgium (Ultratop 50 Wallonia) | 9 |
| Canada (Nielsen SoundScan) | 40 |
| Croatia (HRT) | 2 |
| Denmark (Tracklisten) | 17 |
| Finland (Suomen virallinen lista) | 8 |
| Germany (GfK) | 19 |
| Ireland (IRMA) | 4 |
| Netherlands (Dutch Top 40) | 13 |
| Netherlands (Single Top 100) | 10 |
| Scottish Singles Sales (Official Charts) | 7 |
| Sweden (Sverigetopplistan) | 6 |
| Switzerland (Schweizer Hitparade) | 19 |
| UK Singles (Official Charts) | 8 |
| UK Hip Hop/R&B (Official Charts) | 1 |
| US Billboard Hot 100 | 58 |
| US Hot R&B/Hip-Hop Songs (Billboard) | 26 |
| US Rhythmic Airplay (Billboard) | 5 |

=== Year-end charts ===
| Chart (2000) | position |
|---|---|
| Belgium (Ultratop Wallonia) | 85 |
| Netherlands (Dutch Top 40) | 100 |
| Netherlands (Single Top 100) | 86 |
| Sweden (Sverigetopplistan) | 56 |
| UK Singles (OCC) | 135 |

== Certifications ==
| Region | Certification | Certified units/sales |
|---|---|---|
| Australia (ARIA) | 3× Platinum | 210,000^{‡} |
| Denmark (IFPI Danmark) | Gold | 45,000^{‡} |
| New Zealand (RMNZ) | 2× Platinum | 60,000^{‡} |
| Sweden (GLF) | Gold | 15,000^{^} |
| United Kingdom (BPI) | Platinum | 600,000^{‡} |
| United States (RIAA) | 2× Platinum | 2,000,000^{‡} |
^{^} Shipments figures based on certification alone.^{‡} Sales+streaming figures based on certification alone.
