= Eminem =

American rapper (born 1972)

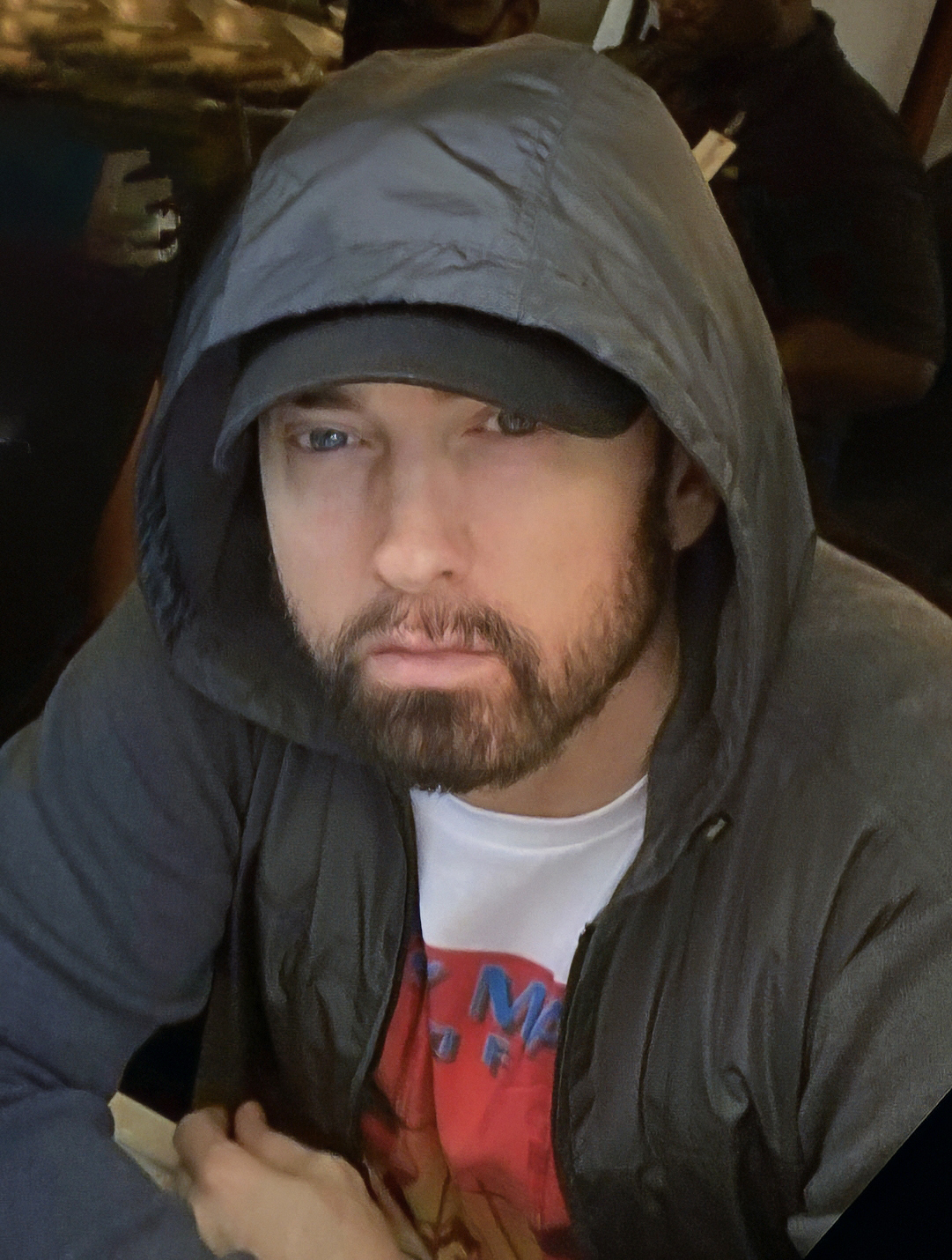
- Eminem in 2021
- Born: Marshall Bruce Mathers III; October 17, 1972 (age 54); St. Joseph, Missouri, U.S.
- Other names: Slim Shady; Evil; M&M; MC Double M; B-Rabbit
- Occupations: Rapper; songwriter; record producer; record executive; actor; entrepreneur
- Years active: 1988–present
- Works: Albums; singles; production; videography
- Spouses: Kimberly Anne Scott (m. 1999; div. 2001) (m. 2006; div. 2006)
- Children: 3
- Awards: Full list; records and achievements
- Musical career
- Origin: Detroit, Michigan, U.S.
- Genre: Hip-hop
- Labels: Shady; Aftermath; Interscope; Web; Polydor
- Formerly of: D12; Outsidaz; Soul Intent; New Jacks; Bad Meets Evil
- Website: eminem.com

Marshall Bruce Mathers III (born October 17, 1972), known professionally as Eminem, (Note: Pronunciation: /ˌɛm.ɪˈnɛm/, EM-in-EM, stylized as EMINƎM) is an American rapper, songwriter, record producer, and record executive. Known for his rap flow and conscious rap, which includes political criticism and social commentary, he is widely regarded as one of the greatest and most influential rappers of all time, often credited with popularizing hip-hop in Middle America and the acceptance of white rappers. While much of his transgressive art during the late 1990s and early 2000s made him a controversial figure, Eminem has become a representation of popular angst in lower-income America.

After the release of his debut album, Infinite (1996), and the extended play Slim Shady EP (1997), Eminem signed with Dr. Dre's Aftermath Entertainment and achieved mainstream popularity with The Slim Shady LP (1999). Each of his next two releases, The Marshall Mathers LP (2000) and The Eminem Show (2002), sold over one million copies in a single week; the latter became the best-selling album worldwide in 2002 and the best-selling hip-hop album of all time. After the release of Encore (2004), Eminem took a hiatus due in part to struggles with prescription drug addiction and death of long-time friend Proof. He returned to the music industry with the releases of Relapse (2009) and Recovery (2010); the latter was the best-selling album worldwide in 2010. Each of his subsequent releases—The Marshall Mathers LP 2 (2013), Revival (2017), Kamikaze (2018), Music to Be Murdered By (2020), and The Death of Slim Shady (Coup de Grâce) (2024)—has debuted atop the US Billboard 200 chart.

Eminem was also a member of the hip-hop groups New Jacks, Soul Intent, Outsidaz, and D12, as well as the duo Bad Meets Evil with Royce da 5'9". In 2002, he starred in the drama film 8 Mile, receiving critical acclaim for playing a dramatized version of himself. "Lose Yourself", a song from the 8 Mile soundtrack, topped the US Billboard Hot 100 chart for 12 weeks—the most for a solo rap song—and won the Academy Award for Best Original Song, making him the first hip-hop act to ever win the award. His other ventures include co-founding the record label Shady Records, establishing the Sirius XM Radio channel Shade 45 and opening the restaurant Mom's Spaghetti, a lyric from the song “Lose Yourself”.

Eminem is the best-selling rapper and one of the best-selling music artists of all time, with estimated sales of over 220 million records. He has 11 number-one albums, an unbeaten record, going 11 for 11, on the Billboard 200 and five number-one singles on the Billboard Hot 100. One of the highest-certified musicians in the United States, Eminem has seven diamond certifications from the Recording Industry Association of America (RIAA). In addition to an Academy Award, his accolades include 15 Grammy Awards, a Primetime Emmy Award, 17 Billboard Music Awards, 15 MTV Video Music Awards, an Oscar induction into the Rock and Roll Hall of Fame in his first year of eligibility. Billboard named him the Artist of the 2000s and Rolling Stone ranked him among the greatest artists and greatest songwriters of all time.

== Early life ==
Marshall Bruce Mathers III was born on October 17, 1972, in St. Joseph, Missouri, the only child of Deborah "Debbie" Nelson and Marshall Bruce Mathers Jr. His mother nearly died during her 73-hour labor with him. Eminem's parents were in a band called Daddy Warbucks, playing in Ramada Inns along the Dakotas–Montana border before they separated. His father abandoned his family when Eminem was a year and a half old, and his mother raised him herself in poverty. He wrote letters to his father, but Nelson said that they all came back marked "return to sender". (Note: In a 2010 interview with Anderson Cooper, Eminem said he never met his father and if given the opportunity, did not want to.)

Eminem and his mother shuttled among states, rarely staying in one house for more than a year or two and mostly living with family members. Locations included St. Joseph; Savannah, Missouri; Kansas City; Warren, Michigan; and Roseville, Michigan, before settling in Detroit when Eminem was 12. For much of his youth, Eminem and his mother lived in a bungalow-style house in a working-class, primarily black neighborhood in Detroit. He and Debbie were one of three white households on their block, and Eminem was beaten several times by black youths. His mother had a son named Nathan "Nate" Kane Samara in 1986 with then-boyfriend Fred Samara. In 2013, the State of Michigan demolished his childhood home after it was damaged by arson.

Eminem frequently fought with his mother, whom a social worker described as having a "very suspicious, almost paranoid personality". When he was a child, a bully named D'Angelo Bailey severely injured his head in an assault, an incident that Eminem later recounted on the song "Brain Damage". Debbie filed a lawsuit against the public school for this in 1982. A Macomb County, Michigan, judge dismissed the suit the following year, ruling that the schools were immune from lawsuits.

Eminem was interested in storytelling, aspiring to be a comic book artist before discovering hip-hop. He heard his first rap song, "Reckless", on the Breakin' soundtrack, a gift from Ronnie Polkingharn, Nelson's half-brother and Eminem's uncle. His uncle was close to the boy and later became a musical mentor to him. Following Polkingharn's suicide in 1991, Eminem stopped speaking publicly for days and did not attend his funeral.

At age 14, Eminem began rapping with high-school friend Mike Ruby; they adopted the names "Manix" and "M&M", the latter evolving into "Eminem". Eminem snuck into neighboring Osborn High School with friend and fellow rapper Proof for lunchroom freestyle rap battles. On Saturdays, they attended open mic contests at the Hip-Hop Shop on West 7 Mile Road, considered "ground zero" for the Detroit rap scene. Struggling to succeed in a predominantly black industry, Eminem was appreciated by underground hip-hop audiences. When he wrote verses, he wanted most of the words to rhyme; he wrote long words or phrases on paper and, underneath, worked on rhymes for each syllable. Although the words often made little sense, the drill helped Eminem practice sounds and rhymes.

In 1987, Nelson allowed runaway Kimberly Anne "Kim" Scott to stay at their home. Several years later, Eminem began an on-and-off relationship with Scott. After spending three years in ninth grade because of truancy and poor grades, 17-year-old Eminem dropped out of Lincoln High School. Although interested in English, Eminem never explored literature, preferring comic books, and he disliked math and social studies. He states that he later received a GED. Eminem worked at several jobs to help his mother pay the bills, one of which was at Little Caesar's Pizza in Warren. He later said she often threw him out of the house anyway, often after taking most of his paycheck. When she left to play bingo, he would blast the stereo and write songs.

== Music career ==
=== 1988–1997: Early career, Infinite and family struggles ===
In 1988, he went by the stage name MC Double M and formed his first group, New Jacks, and made demo tape recordings with DJ Butter Fingers. In 1989, they joined Bassmint Productions who later changed their name to Soul Intent in 1992 with rapper Proof and other Detroit artists. They released a two-track single on cassette in 1995 featuring Proof. Eminem also made his first music video appearance in 1992 in a song titled, "Do-Da-Dippity", by Champtown. Later in 1996, Eminem and Proof teamed up with four other rappers to form The Dirty Dozen (D12), who released The Underground E.P. in 1997 and their first album Devil's Night in 2001. He was also affiliated with Newark's rap collective Outsidaz, collaborating with them on different projects.

In 1995, Eminem was signed to Jeff and Mark Bass' F.B.T. Productions and in 1995–1996 recorded his debut album Infinite for their independent Web Entertainment label. The album was a commercial failure upon its release in 1996. During this period, Eminem's rhyming style, primarily inspired by rappers Nas and AZ, lacked the comically violent slant for which he later became known. Detroit disc jockeys largely ignored Infinite and the feedback Eminem did receive ("Why don't you go into rock and roll?") led him to craft angrier, moodier tracks.

At this time, Eminem and Kim Scott lived in a crime-ridden neighborhood where their house was robbed several times. Eminem cooked and washed dishes for minimum wage at Gilbert's Lodge, a family-style restaurant in St. Clair Shores. His former boss described him as becoming a model employee, as he worked 60 hours a week for six months after the birth of his daughter, Hailie Jade Scott Mathers. He was fired shortly before Christmas and later said, "It was, like, five days before Christmas, which is Hailie's birthday. I had, like, forty dollars to get her something." After the release of Infinite, his personal problems and substance abuse culminated in a suicide attempt. By March 1997, he was fired from Gilbert's Lodge for the last time and lived in his mother's mobile home with Kim and Hailie.

=== 1997–1999: Introduction of Slim Shady, The Slim Shady LP and rise to success ===
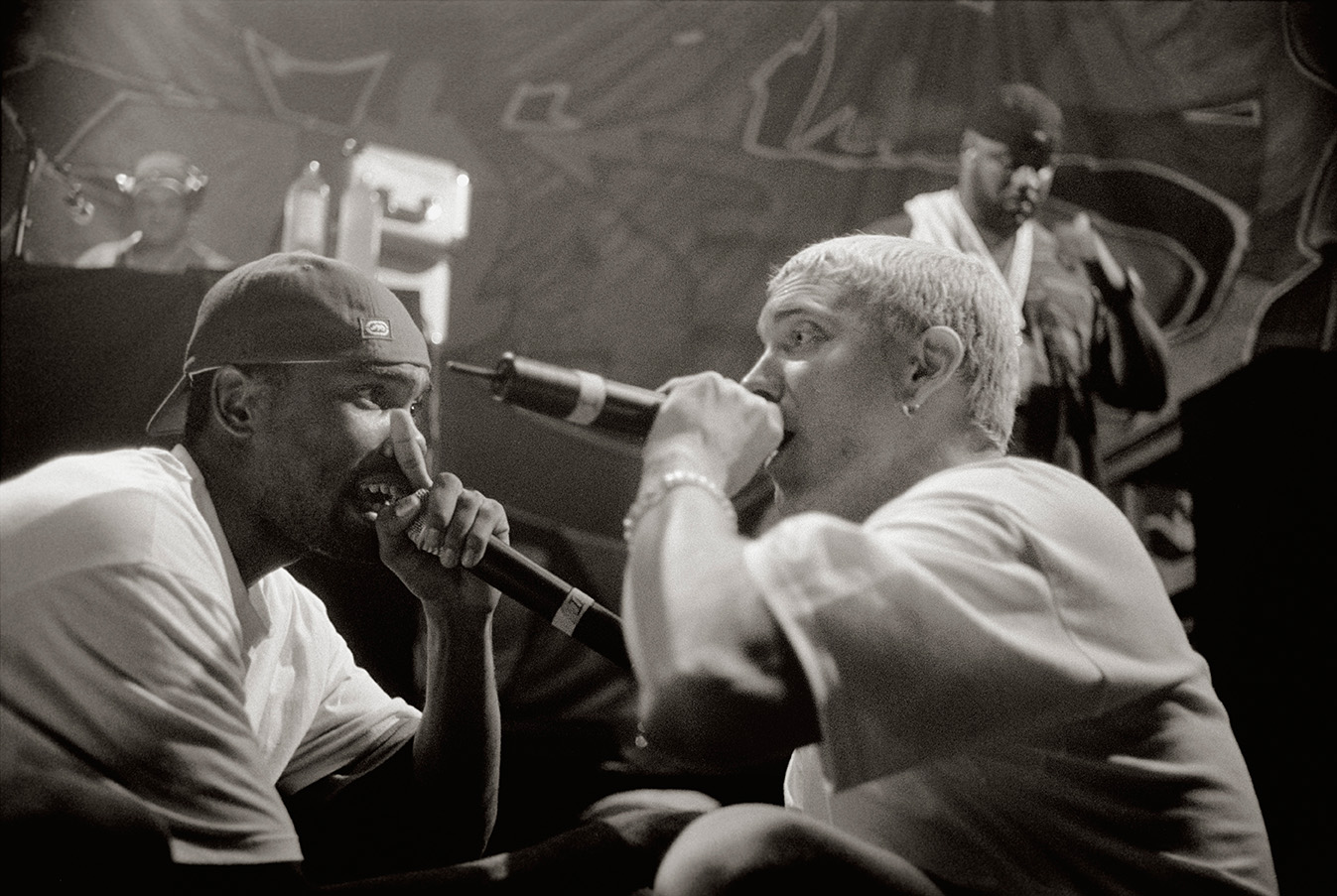
Eminem and Proof performing at Juice Jam in Munich, Germany, in 1999

Eminem attracted more attention when he developed Slim Shady, a sadistic, violent alter ego. The character allowed him to express his anger with lyrics about drugs, rape, and murder. In the spring of 1997, he recorded his debut EP, the Slim Shady EP, which was released that winter by Web Entertainment. The EP, with frequent references to drug use, sexual acts, mental instability, and violence, also explored the more serious themes of dealing with poverty and marital and family difficulties and revealed his direct, self-deprecating response to criticism. Hip-hop magazine The Source featured Eminem in its "Unsigned Hype" column in March 1998.

In 1997, Eminem participated in the Scribble Jam MC battle held in Cincinnati, where he ended up losing to MC Juice in the finals. After he was fired from his job and evicted from his home, Eminem went to Los Angeles to compete in the 1997 Rap Olympics, a nationwide battle rap competition. He placed second, losing to Project Blowed MC Otherwize. An Interscope Records intern named Dean Geistlinger was in attendance and asked Eminem for a copy of the Slim Shady EP, which was then sent to company CEO Jimmy Iovine. Iovine played the tape for record producer Dr. Dre, founder of Aftermath Entertainment and founding member of hip-hop group N.W.A. Dre recalled, "In my entire career in the music industry, I have never found anything from a demo tape or a CD. When Jimmy played this, I said, 'Find him. Now.'", expressing his shock towards Mathers's rapping talent. Although his associates criticized him for hiring a white rapper, Dre was confident in his decision: "I don't give a fuck if you're purple; if you can kick it, I'm working with you." Eminem had idolized Dre since listening to N.W.A as a teenager and was nervous about working with him on an album. He became more comfortable working with Dre after a series of productive recording sessions. On March 9, 1998, Eminem got signed to Aftermath and Interscope.

Eminem released The Slim Shady LP in February 1999. Although it was one of the year's most popular albums (certified triple platinum by the end of the year), he was accused of imitating the style and subject matter of underground rapper Cage (who he refers to in the album's song "Role Model"). The album's popularity was accompanied by controversy over its lyrics; in "'97 Bonnie & Clyde", Eminem describes a trip with his infant daughter when he disposes of his wife's body and in "Guilty Conscience", he encourages a man to murder his wife and her lover. "Guilty Conscience" marked the beginning of a friendship and musical bond between Dr. Dre and Eminem. The label-mates later collaborated on a number of hit songs and Dre made at least one guest appearance on each of Eminem's Aftermath albums. The Slim Shady LP has been certified quadruple platinum by the RIAA.

=== 1999–2003: The Marshall Mathers LP and The Eminem Show ===
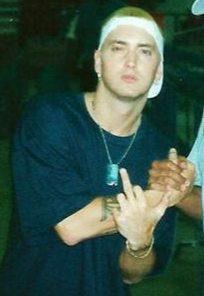
Eminem at the ARCO Arena for the Up in Smoke Tour in June 2000

After Eminem released The Slim Shady LP, he started his own record label, Shady Records, in late 1999. Eminem looked for an avenue to release D12, and his manager Paul Rosenberg was keen to start a label, which led to the two teaming up to form Shady. Its A&R Marc Labelle has defined the record label as "a boutique label but [with] all the outlets of a major [and] Interscope backing up our every move."

Recorded from 1999 to 2000, The Marshall Mathers LP was released in May 2000. It sold 1.76 million copies in its first week, breaking U.S. records held by Snoop Dogg's Doggystyle for fastest-selling hip-hop album and Britney Spears' ...Baby One More Time for fastest-selling solo album. The first single from the album, "The Real Slim Shady", was a success despite controversies about Eminem's insults and dubious claims about celebrities. In his second single, "The Way I Am", he reveals the pressure from his record company to top "My Name Is". Although Eminem parodied shock rocker Marilyn Manson in the music video for "My Name Is", they are reportedly on good terms; Manson is mentioned in "The Way I Am", appeared in its music video and has performed a live remix of the song with Eminem. The third single, "Stan", was ranked by Q as the third-greatest rap song ever, and it was ranked tenth in a Top40-Charts.com survey. The song has since been ranked 296th on Rolling Stone's "500 Greatest Songs of All Time" list. In July 2000, Eminem was the first white artist to appear on the cover of The Source. The Marshall Mathers LP was certified Diamond by the RIAA in March 2011 and sold 21 million copies worldwide.

In 2000, Eminem appeared in the Up in Smoke Tour and the Family Values Tour, headlining the Anger Management Tour with Papa Roach, Ludacris, and Xzibit. Eminem performed with Elton John at the 43rd Grammy Awards ceremony in 2001. GLAAD, an organization, which considered Eminem's lyrics homophobic, condemned John's decision to perform with Eminem. Entertainment Weekly placed the appearance on its end-of-decade "best-of" list: "It was the hug heard 'round the world. Eminem, under fire for homophobic lyrics, shared the stage with a gay icon for a performance of 'Stan' that would have been memorable in any context." On February 21, the day of the awards ceremony, GLAAD held a protest outside the Staples Center (the ceremony's venue). Eminem was also the only guest artist to appear on fellow rapper Jay-Z's critically acclaimed album The Blueprint, producing and rapping on the song "Renegade".

The Eminem Show was released in May 2002. It was another success, reaching number one on the charts and selling over 1.332 million copies during its first full week. The Eminem Show, certified Diamond by the RIAA, examines the effects of Eminem's rise to fame, his relationship with his wife and daughter and his status in the hip-hop community, addressing an assault charge brought by a bouncer he saw kissing his wife in 2000. Stephen Thomas Erlewine of AllMusic found The Eminem Show less inflammatory than The Marshall Mathers LP. L. Brent Bozell III, who had criticized The Marshall Mathers LP for misogynistic lyrics, noted The Eminem Show's extensive use of obscenity and called Eminem "Eminef" for the prevalence of the word "motherfucker" on the album. The Eminem Show sold 27 million copies worldwide and was the bestselling album of 2002.

=== 2003–2007: Production work, Encore and musical hiatus ===
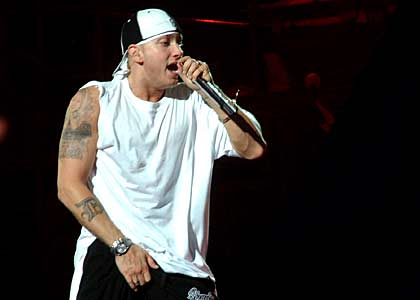
Eminem on the Anger Management Tour in 2003

In 2003, Eminem, a lifelong fan of Tupac, provided production work for three tracks on the Tupac Resurrection soundtrack. He would follow this up the next year by producing 12 of the 16 tracks on Tupac's Loyal to the Game album. On December 8, 2003, the United States Secret Service said that it was "looking into" allegations that Eminem had threatened the President of the United States. The cause for concern was the lyrics of "We As Americans" ("Fuck money / I don't rap for dead presidents / I'd rather see the president dead / It's never been said, but I set precedents"), which was later released on a bonus CD with the deluxe edition of Encore.

Encore, released in 2004, was another success, but not as successful as his previous albums. Its sales were partially driven by the first single, "Just Lose It", which contained slurs directed toward Michael Jackson. On October 12, 2004, a week after the release of "Just Lose It", Jackson phoned Steve Harvey's radio show, The Steve Harvey Morning Show, to report his displeasure with its video (which parodies Jackson's child molestation trial, plastic surgery and the 1984 incident when Jackson's hair caught fire during the filming of a commercial). Many of Jackson's friends and supporters spoke out against the video, including Stevie Wonder, who described it as "kicking a man while he's down" and "bullshit", and Steve Harvey (who said, "Eminem has lost his ghetto pass. We want the pass back"). "Weird Al" Yankovic, who parodied the Eminem song "Lose Yourself" on "Couch Potato" for his 2003 album Poodle Hat, told the Chicago Sun-Times about Jackson's protest: "Last year, Eminem forced me to halt production on the video for my 'Lose Yourself' parody because he somehow thought that it would be harmful to his image or career. So the irony of this situation with Michael is not lost on me." Although Black Entertainment Television stopped playing the video, MTV announced that it would continue to air it. The Source, through CEO Raymond "Benzino" Scott, called for the video to be pulled, the song removed from the album and Eminem to apologize publicly to Jackson. In 2007, Jackson and Sony bought Famous Music from Viacom, giving him the rights to songs by Eminem, among other artists.

Despite its lead single's humorous theme, Encore explored serious subject matter with the anti-war song "Mosh", which criticized President George W. Bush. On October 25, 2004, a week before the 2004 U.S. Presidential election, Eminem released the video for "Mosh" on the Internet. In it, Eminem gathers an army of Bush-administration victims and leads them to the White House. When they break in, it is learned that they are there to register to vote; the video ends with "VOTE Tuesday November 2." After Bush's reelection, the video's ending was changed to Eminem and the protesters invading the White House during a speech by the president. Also in 2004, Eminem launched a satellite music channel, Shade 45, on Sirius radio, which was described by his manager as "essentially a destination to get and hear things that other people aren't playing."

Eminem began his first U.S. concert tour in three years in the summer of 2005 with the Anger Management 3 Tour, but in August, he canceled the European leg of the tour, later announcing that he had entered drug rehabilitation for treatment of a "dependency on sleep medication". Meanwhile, industry insiders speculated that Eminem was considering retirement, while rumors circulated that a double album titled The Funeral would be released. In July, the Detroit Free Press reported a possible final bow for Eminem as a solo performer, quoting members of his inner circle as saying that he would embrace the roles of producer and label executive. A greatest hits album, Curtain Call: The Hits, was released on December 6, 2005, by Aftermath Entertainment, and sold nearly 441,000 copies in the U.S. in its first week, marking Eminem's fourth consecutive number-one album on the Billboard Hot 200, and was certified double platinum by the RIAA. However, Eminem suggested that month on WKQI's "Mojo in the Morning" show that he would be taking a break as an artist: "I'm at a point in my life right now where I feel like I don't know where my career is going ... This is the reason that we called it 'Curtain Call' because this could be the final thing. We don't know."

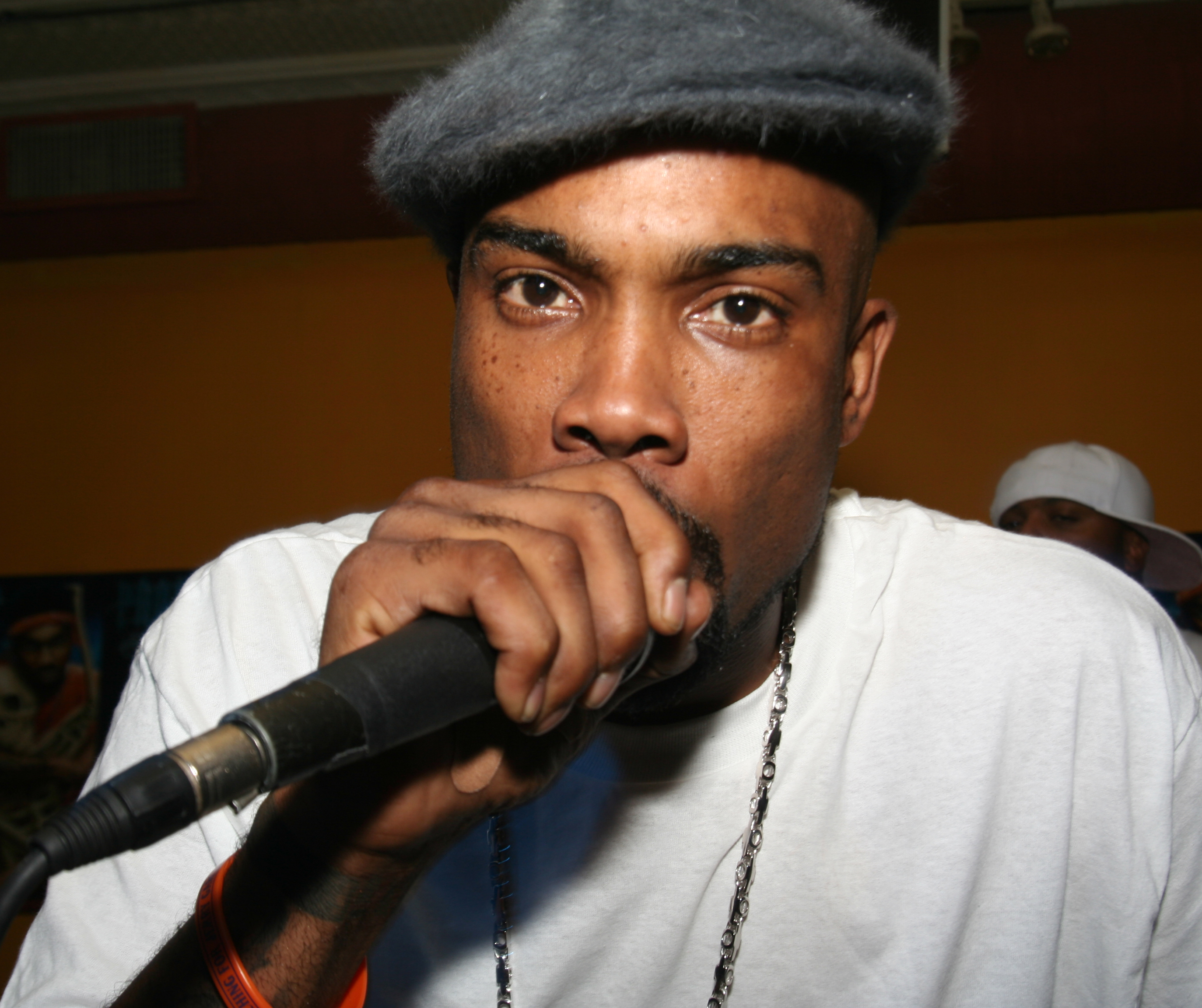
Proof's death in 2006 was one of the factors that caused Eminem to fall into depression during his five-year hiatus.

In April 2006, Proof, who was Eminem's childhood friend, was killed. Eight months later, on December 5, Eminem released a compilation album titled Eminem Presents: The Re-Up that featured Proof and other Shady Records artists.

=== 2007–2009: Comeback and Relapse ===
In September 2007, Eminem called New York radio station WQHT during an interview with 50 Cent, saying that he was "in limbo" and "debating" about when (or if) he would release another album. He appeared on his Shade 45 Sirius channel in September 2008, saying: "Right now I'm kinda just concentrating on my own stuff, for right now and just banging out tracks and producing a lot of stuff. You know, the more I keep producing the better it seems like I get 'cause I just start knowing stuff." Interscope confirmed that a new album would be released in spring 2009.

According to a March 5, 2009, press release, Eminem would release two new albums that year. Relapse, the first, was released on May 19; its first single and music video, "We Made You", had been released on April 7. Although Relapse did not sell as well as Eminem's previous albums and received mixed reviews, it was a commercial success and re-established his presence in the hip-hop world. It sold more than five million copies worldwide. On October 30, he headlined at the Voodoo Experience in New Orleans, his first full performance of the year. Eminem's act included several songs from Relapse, many of his older hits and an appearance by D12. On November 19, he announced on his website that Relapse: Refill would be released on December 21. The album was a re-release of Relapse with seven bonus tracks, including "Forever" and "Taking My Ball". Eminem described the CD:

I want to deliver more material for the fans this year like I originally planned ... Hopefully, these tracks on The Refill will tide the fans over until we put out Relapse 2 next year ... I got back in with Dre and then a few more producers, including Just Blaze, and went in a completely different direction which made me start from scratch. The new tracks started to sound very different than the tracks I originally intended to be on Relapse 2, but I still want the other stuff to be heard.

=== 2009–2011: Recovery and Bad Meets Evil reunion ===
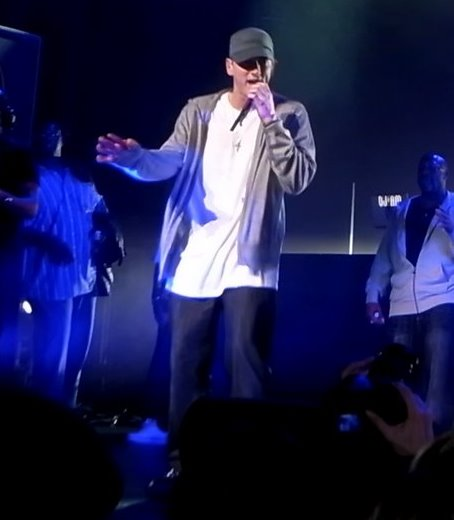
Eminem performing with D12 in May 2009

On April 14, 2010, Eminem tweeted: "There is no Relapse 2". Although his followers thought he was not releasing an album, he had changed its title to Recovery and confirmed this by tweeting "Recovery" with a link to his website. He said:

I had originally planned for Relapse 2 to come out last year. But as I kept recording and working with new producers, the idea of a sequel to Relapse started to make less and less sense to me, and I wanted to make a completely new album. The music on Recovery came out very different from Relapse, and I think it deserves its own title.

Recorded from 2009 to 2010, Recovery was released on June 18. In the U.S., Recovery sold 741,000 copies during its first week, topping the Billboard 200 chart. Eminem's sixth consecutive U.S. number-one album also topped the charts in several other countries. Recovery remained atop the Billboard 200 chart for five consecutive weeks of a seven-week total.

Billboard reported that it was the bestselling album of 2010, making Eminem the first artist in Nielsen SoundScan history with two year-end bestselling albums. Recovery was the first album to sell over a million digital copies in the US. Its first single, "Not Afraid", was released on April 29 and debuted atop the Billboard Hot 100; its music video was released on June 4. "Not Afraid" was followed by "Love the Way You Lie", which debuted at number two before rising to the top. Although "Love the Way You Lie" was the bestselling 2010 single in the United Kingdom, it did not reach number one (the first time this has happened in the UK since 1969). Despite criticism of its inconsistency, Recovery received positive reviews from most critics. As of November 21, 2010, the album had U.S. sales of three million copies. Recovery was the bestselling album worldwide in 2010, joining 2002's bestseller The Eminem Show to give Eminem two worldwide year-end number-one albums. With Recovery, Eminem broke the record for the most successive U.S. number-one albums by a solo artist.

In June 2010, Eminem and Jay-Z announced they would perform together in Detroit and New York City, at concerts called The Home & Home Tour. The first two concerts quickly sold out, prompting an additional show in each city. BET called Eminem the number-one rapper of the 21st century. Due to the success of Recovery and the Home & Home Tour, Eminem was named the 2010 Hottest MC in the Game by MTV and Emcee of the Year by the online magazine HipHopDX. He and Rihanna again collaborated on "Love the Way You Lie (Part II)", the sequel of their hit single. In December 2010, the "Great Eminem Recovery" was number one on Billboard's Top 25 Music Moments of 2010. That month it was announced that "Space Bound" would be the fourth single from Recovery, with a music video featuring former porn actress Sasha Grey; the video was released June 24 on the iTunes Store.

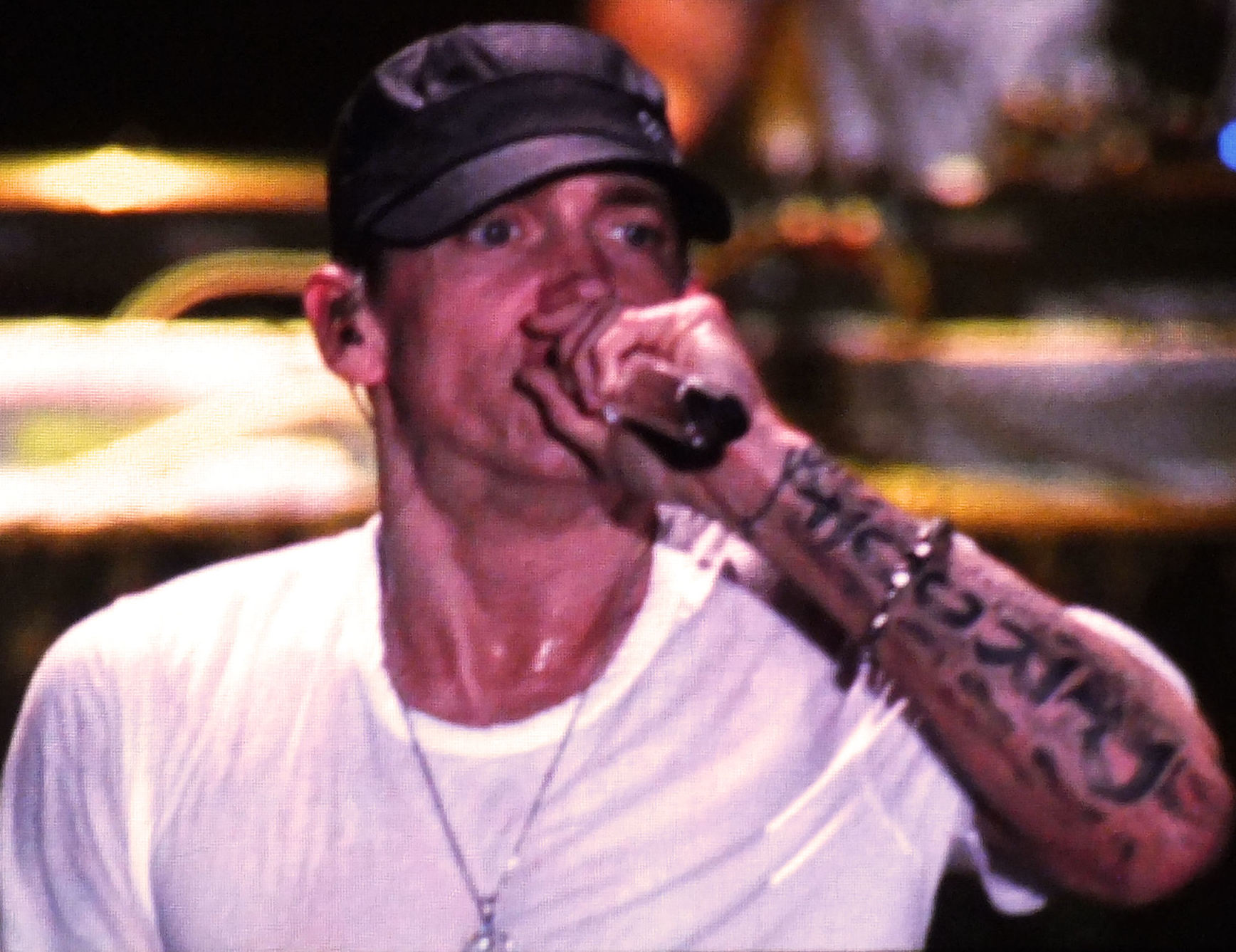
Eminem performing at Lollapalooza 2011

In 2010, Eminem again began collaborating with Royce da 5'9" on their first EP as Bad Meets Evil; the duo formed in 1998. The EP, Hell: The Sequel, was released on June 14, 2011. Eminem was featured on Royce da 5'9"'s "Writer's Block", released on April 8, 2011. On May 3 they released the lead single "Fast Lane" from their upcoming EP and a music video was filmed. In March 2011, within days of each other, The Eminem Show and The Marshall Mathers LP were certified diamond by the RIAA; Eminem is the only rapper with two diamond-certified albums. With more than 60 million "likes" he was the most-followed person on Facebook. Eminem was the first artist in five years with two number-one albums (Recovery and Hell: The Sequel) in a 12-month period. Early in 2011 he leaked "2.0 Boys", on which Yelawolf and Slaughterhouse collaborated when they signed with Shady Records in January and performed it in April. Bad Meets Evil released their next single, "Lighters", on July 6 and its music video in late August. On August 6, Eminem performed several songs from throughout his career at Lollapalooza with the artists who had been featured on each song.

=== 2012–2016: The Marshall Mathers LP 2, Shady XV and Southpaw ===
On August 14, 2013, "Survival", featuring Liz Rodrigues and produced by DJ Khalil, premiered in the multi-player trailer for the video game Call of Duty: Ghosts. According to a press release, the first single from Eminem's eighth album would be released soon. During the 2013 MTV Video Music Awards, it was announced that the album would be entitled The Marshall Mathers LP 2. Its lead single, "Berzerk", was released on August 25 and debuted at number three on the Billboard Hot 100 chart. The album was released on November 5, by Aftermath Entertainment, Shady Records and Interscope Records. Its standard version had 16 tracks and the deluxe version included a second disc with five additional tracks. The Marshall Mathers LP 2 was Eminem's seventh album to debut atop the Billboard 200 and had the year's second-largest first-week sales. He was the first artist since the Beatles to have four singles in the top 20 of the Billboard Hot 100. In the United Kingdom, The Marshall Mathers LP 2 debuted at number one on the UK Albums Chart. The first American artist with seven consecutive UK number-one albums, he is tied with the Beatles for second place for the most consecutive chart-topping UK albums. The album secured Eminem's position as Canada's bestselling artist and was 2013's bestselling album.

On November 3, Eminem was named the first YouTube Music Awards Artist of the Year, and a week later he received the Global Icon Award at the 2013 MTV Europe Music Awards. On June 10, it was announced that Eminem was the first artist to receive two digital diamond certifications—sales and streams of 10 million and above—by the RIAA (for "Not Afraid" and "Love the Way You Lie"). On July 11 and 12, Eminem played two concerts in Wembley Stadium. At the 57th Grammy Awards, he received the Best Rap Album award for The Marshall Mathers LP 2 and Best Rap/Sung Collaboration (with Rihanna) for "The Monster".

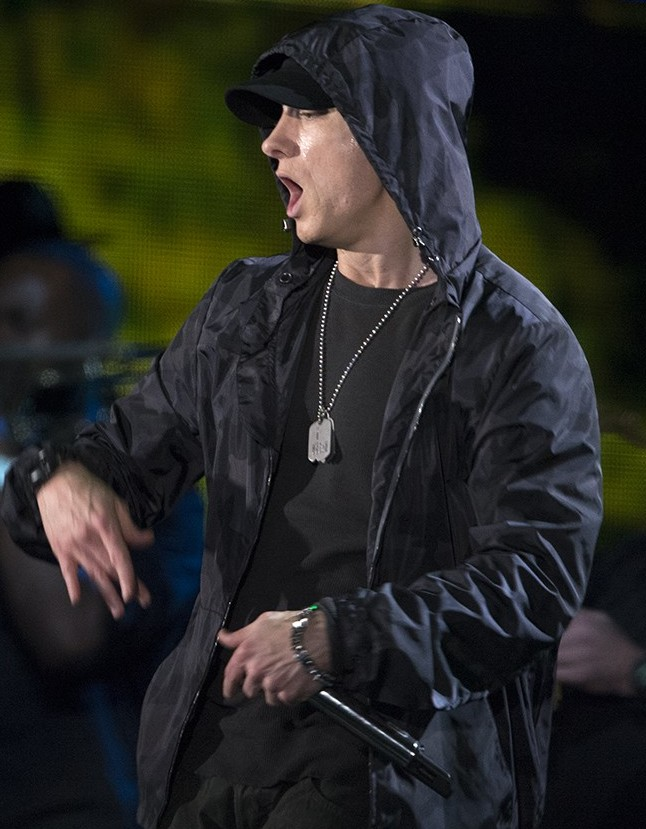
Eminem performing at the Concert for Valor in Washington, D.C. in 2014

In the summer of 2014, Eminem and Rosenberg began using the hashtag #SHADYXV on social networking sites and Eminem wore a T-shirt with the hashtag onstage. This was later revealed to be the name of an upcoming Shady Records compilation. Shortly afterwards the first single from the album ("Guts Over Fear", featuring singer-songwriter Sia) was released and the album's track list was released on October 29. Shady Records released a cypher to promote the album, in which Eminem did a seven-minute freestyle. Shady XV, released on November 24 during Black Friday week, consists of one greatest-hits disc and one disc of new material by Shady Records artists such as D12, Slaughterhouse, Bad Meets Evil and Yelawolf. The album debuted at number three on the Billboard 200 chart, with first-week sales of 138,000 copies in the United States. The Official Eminem Box Set, a career-spanning, 10-disc vinyl box set, was released on March 12, 2015. The set includes seven of Eminem's eight studio albums (excluding Infinite), the 8 Mile soundtrack, the compilation Eminem Presents: The Re-Up and the greatest hits collection Curtain Call: The Hits.

Eminem is the executive producer of the soundtrack on the sports drama Southpaw, with Shady Records. He was the first interviewee of Zane Lowe in Beats 1. The interview streamed online on the Beats 1 radio on July 1, 2015. Eminem appeared on the public access show Only in Monroe, produced in Monroe, Michigan. In June 2015, it was revealed that Eminem would serve as the executive producer and music supervisor on the TV series Motor City whose premise was based upon the 2002 film Narc. On October 19, 2016, Eminem released a new song called "Campaign Speech", a political hip-hop song and announced he was working on a new album. On November 17, 2016, Eminem released a remastered version of 'Infinite' on his YouTube VEVO channel. On November 22, 2016, Eminem released a trailer for a 10-minute short documentary called Partners in Rhyme: The True Story of Infinite.

=== 2017–2019: Revival and Kamikaze ===
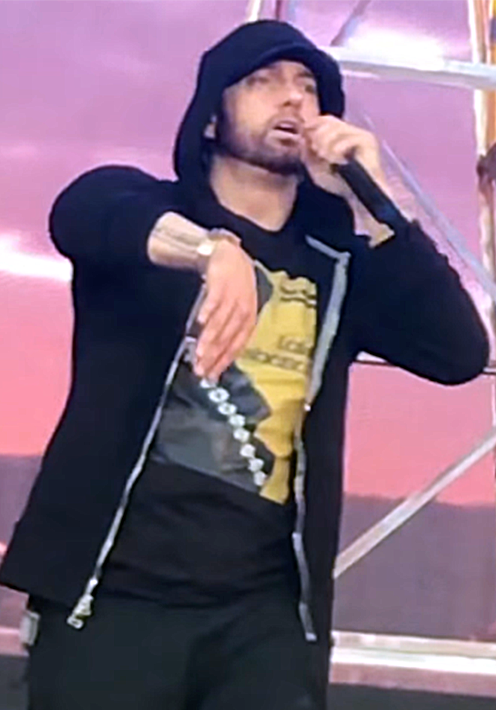
Eminem performing in 2018

In February 2017, Eminem appeared on "No Favors", a track from Big Sean's album I Decided. In the song, Eminem calls the newly elected President Donald Trump a "bitch" and raps about raping conservative commentator Ann Coulter, a Trump supporter, with various foreign objects. Coulter responded, stating, "I think it's unfortunate that the left, from Berkeley to Eminem with his rap songs, has normalized violence against women, as Eminem has done."

Eminem participated in the 2017 BET Hip Hop Awards cypher, delivering a freestyle called "The Storm", in which he criticized Trump and his administration for prioritizing National Football League players' protests over recovery efforts from Hurricane Maria, and for failing to enact gun control reform following the 2017 Las Vegas shooting. He concluded the cypher by stating that Trump supporters cannot be his fans. The verse received widespread praise from other rappers. Reports emerged that the Secret Service interviewed Eminem in 2018–2019 regarding his threatening lyrics toward President Trump and daughter Ivanka.

Beginning in late October 2017, Eminem and Paul Rosenberg teased what fans speculated to be the title of his next album, Revival, through advertisements for a fake medication of the same name. In November, the first single, "Walk on Water", featuring Beyoncé, was released. Eminem debuted the song live at the 2017 MTV Europe Music Awards on November 12, with Skylar Grey performing the chorus. On November 28, Dr. Dre confirmed the album's release date as December 15, 2017. Despite an online leak two days prior, Revival was released as scheduled. The second single, "River", featuring Ed Sheeran, was released on January 5, 2018. The album debuted at number one on the U.S. Billboard 200, with 197,000 copies sold in its first week, making Eminem the first act to have eight consecutive albums debut atop the chart. However, Revival received mixed to negative reviews and is often regarded as Eminem's weakest album. In 2018, an extended edition of "Nowhere Fast" featuring Kehlani and a remix of "Chloraseptic" with 2 Chainz and Phresher were released from the album.

On August 31, 2018, Eminem released his tenth studio album and first surprise album, Kamikaze, just eight months after Revival. The album debuted at number one on the Billboard 200, Eminem's ninth consecutive album to do so, with first-week sales of 434,000 units. Kamikaze was a response to the criticism of Revival. It was supported by three singles: "Fall", "Venom" from the 2018 film of the same name, and "Lucky You". On October 15, 2018, Eminem performed "Venom" live from the 103rd floor of the Empire State Building on Jimmy Kimmel Live! as promotion for the album.

On December 1, 2018, Eminem released an 11-minute freestyle titled "Kick Off" on his YouTube channel. Throughout early 2019, he collaborated with artists including Boogie, Logic, Ed Sheeran, 50 Cent, and Conway the Machine. On February 23, 2019, to mark the 20th anniversary of The Slim Shady LP, Eminem released a re-issue including acapellas, instrumentals, and radio edits of tracks from the album.

=== 2020–2023: Music to Be Murdered By and Curtain Call 2 ===
On January 17, 2020, Eminem released another surprise album, Music to Be Murdered By. The album debuted at number one on the Billboard 200, selling 279,000 album-equivalent units in its first week. With this, Eminem became the first artist to have ten consecutive albums debut at number one in the United States, and one of six artists to have released at least ten U.S. number-one albums. Music critics praised Eminem's lyrical abilities and the improved production compared to Kamikaze, though some criticized the album's formulaic song structure, lack of innovation, and shock value.

The song "Unaccommodating", which references the 2017 Manchester Arena bombing, drew significant criticism. The mayor of Manchester described the lyrics as "unnecessarily hurtful and deeply disrespectful," and victims' relatives and others involved in the attack also condemned the song. On February 9, 2020, Eminem performed "Lose Yourself" at the 92nd Academy Awards. The music video for "Godzilla" was released on March 9, 2020, via Lyrical Lemonade's YouTube channel. On March 11, 2020, Music to Be Murdered By was certified Gold by the RIAA. On July 9, 2020, Kid Cudi's daughter Vada announced that he would release a song with Eminem titled "The Adventures of Moon Man & Slim Shady" the following Friday.

A deluxe edition titled Music to Be Murdered By – Side B was released on December 18, 2020, also without prior announcement, featuring a bonus disc with sixteen new tracks. The release was accompanied by a music video for "Gnat", directed by Cole Bennett. Lyric videos for "Alfred's Theme" and "Tone Deaf" were also released, the latter paying tribute to the late Chicago rapper King Von. Side B debuted at number three on the Billboard 200, earning 70,000–80,000 album-equivalent units, including 25,000–30,000 in pure sales. On the track "Zeus", Eminem apologizes to Rihanna over a leaked song from his Relapse sessions where he sided with Chris Brown, who pleaded guilty to felony assault involving her in 2009.

Eminem was featured alongside Polo G and Mozzy on Skylar Grey's song "Last One Standing" for the soundtrack of the film Venom: Let There Be Carnage, released September 30, 2021. He performed with LL Cool J at the Rock and Roll Hall of Fame ceremony on October 30, 2021. On February 13, 2022, Eminem performed at the Super Bowl LVI halftime show alongside Dr. Dre, Snoop Dogg, Kendrick Lamar, and Mary J. Blige. Eminem and CeeLo Green collaborated on "The King and I", produced by Dr. Dre, for Baz Luhrmann's Elvis soundtrack. On June 24, 2022, Eminem and Snoop Dogg released the song "From the D 2 the LBC" and publicly reconciled.

Eminem announced his second greatest hits album, Curtain Call 2, on July 11, 2022. The sequel to 2005's Curtain Call: The Hits, it covers albums from Relapse through Music to Be Murdered By, collaborations, and soundtrack songs. Released on August 5, 2022, it includes his two precedent singles and the unreleased track "Is This Love ('09)" featuring 50 Cent. Eminem was inducted into the Rock and Roll Hall of Fame in 2022, with Dr. Dre presenting.

In July 2023, Eminem's Shady Records signed rapper Ez Mil in a joint deal with Aftermath Entertainment and Interscope Records. On August 4, 2023, Ez Mil released the song "Realest", featuring Eminem. In the track, Eminem addresses comments from Melle Mel, who claimed Eminem's status as a top-five rapper was due to his race. He also responds to the Game, who had released a 10-minute diss track aimed at Eminem, "The Black Slim Shady", in 2022. On November 3, Eminem released The Marshall Mathers LP 2 (Expanded Edition), marking the 10th anniversary of its original release. The expanded edition includes all original tracks plus "Don't Front", featuring Buckshot—a bonus track previously available with the Call of Duty: Ghosts album bundle and on the Best Buy version of the Shady XV compilation. It also features instrumentals for the album's singles: "Survival", "Berzerk", "The Monster" (featuring Rihanna), "Rap God", and "Headlights".

=== 2024–2025: The Death of Slim Shady (Coup de Grâce) and Stans ===
During an episode of Jimmy Kimmel Live! on March 19, 2024, Dr. Dre stated that Eminem intended to release a new album that year. On April 25, Eminem appeared alongside Roger Goodell at the opening ceremony of the 2024 NFL draft in Detroit. At the same time, Eminem announced a twelfth studio album titled The Death of Slim Shady (Coup de Grâce), with a planned release later in the year. The trailer for the album, which was shown on the NFL Network, briefly discusses the "murder" of the Slim Shady persona in a true crime format. The album is produced by Dr. Dre and The ICU. The lead single, "Houdini", was released on May 31, 2024. It topped the charts in many countries, as well as debuting at number one on the Billboard Global 200 and number two on the Hot 100.

On June 28, 2024, Eminem posted a teaser for the album's second single, titled "Tobey", featuring fellow Detroit rappers Big Sean and BabyTron. It was released on July 2, with an accompanying music video produced by Cole Bennett following on July 5. The concept album was released on July 12, 2024, through Shady Records, Aftermath Entertainment, and Interscope Records. It became Eminem's eleventh number-one album on the Billboard 200, ending Taylor Swift's chart run. It was met with mixed reviews from critics, with praise directed towards Eminem's rapping techniques while panning its attempts at shocking lyrics as "predictable", "disjointed and incoherent", and featuring "infantile wordplay".

Eminem opened the 2024 MTV Video Music Awards with a self-referential performance of "Houdini" and "Somebody Save Me". On August 31, 2024, rapper LL Cool J released the single "Murdergram Deux", featuring Eminem, marking the pair's first ever collaboration. Eminem also featured on the track "Gunz N Smoke" from Snoop Dogg's album Missionary, released in December 2024, alongside 50 Cent.

In January 2025, over two dozen unreleased Eminem songs leaked online, including "Smack You", a diss track aimed at Ja Rule and Suge Knight that was recorded c. 2003. In May 2025, Eminem won Favorite Hip Hop Artist and Favorite Hip Hop Album for The Death of Slim Shady (Coup de Grâce) at the 2025 American Music Awards. In June 2025, "Animals (Pt. I)", a collaboration with JID, was released. In July 2025, Eminem announced the release of the documentary film Stans, focusing on his career and rise to fame through the perspective of his most devoted fans. Set for a global release in theaters August 7–10, the film was accompanied by a soundtrack, Stans: The Official Soundtrack, which released on August 26, featuring tracks that inspired the film as well as a previously unreleased song, titled "Everybody's Looking At Me". In November 2025, Eminem collaborated with IO Interactive for an appearance as himself and Slim Shady in a time-limited mission in Hitman: World of Assassination, based on The Death of Slim Shady. That same month, at the 86th Thanksgiving Day game, Eminem performed at Detroit Lions's halftime show with Jack White.

=== 2026–present: Feature with Ez Mil, Kid Rock ===
On October 9, 2026, Eminem was featured on the song "Madara" by Filipino rapper Ez Mil. On October 17, Eminem featured on Kid Rock's album Halfway 2 Jesus on a song titled "Heal My Faith", sparking widespread backlash due to Rock's political endorsements. He also collaborated with rapper IDK on the song "Welcome", featuring posthumous production from J Dilla.

== Artistry ==
=== Influences, style and rapping technique ===
Eminem has cited several MCs as influencing his rapping style, including Kool G Rap, Masta Ace, Big Daddy Kane, Tupac, Newcleus, Ice-T, Mantronix, Melle Mel (on "The Message"), LL Cool J, Beastie Boys, Run-D.M.C., Rakim, and Boogie Down Productions. At the 2022 Rock and Roll Hall of Fame induction, Eminem named more than 100 artists from hip-hop's golden age—from rap's early days through to the mid-1990s—who contributed, in ways big and small, to the artist he would become.

In How to Rap, Guerilla Black notes that Eminem studied other MCs to hone his rapping technique: "Eminem listened to everything and that's what made him one of the greats". In the book, other MCs also praise aspects of his rapping technique: varied, humorous subject matter, connecting with his audience, carrying a concept over a series of albums, complex rhyme schemes, bending words so they rhyme, multisyllabic rhymes, many rhymes to a bar, complex rhythms, clear enunciation, and the use of melody and syncopation. Eminem is known to write most of his lyrics on paper (documented in The Way I Am), taking several days or a week to craft lyrics, being a "workaholic" and "stacking" vocals. Examples of hip-hop subgenres that Eminem's music has been described as include horrorcore, comedy hip-hop, and hardcore hip-hop. Eminem also incorporates rap rock into his music and has cited rock acts during the 1970s and 1980s, such as Jimi Hendrix and Led Zeppelin, as influences in his music.

=== Productions ===
Eminem was the executive producer of D12's first two albums (Devil's Night and D12 World), Obie Trice's Cheers and Second Round's on Me and 50 Cent's Get Rich or Die Tryin' and The Massacre. Most of The Eminem Show was produced by Eminem and his longtime collaborator, Jeff Bass, and Eminem co-produced Encore with Dr. Dre. In 2004, Eminem was co-executive producer of 2Pac's posthumous album Loyal to the Game with Shakur's mother, Afeni.

Eminem is considered unusual in structuring his songs around the lyrics, rather than writing to beats. One exception was "Stan", which came from an idea and scratch track produced by the 45 King. After doing little production on Relapse and Recovery, Eminem produced a significant portion of The Marshall Mathers LP 2. He said about producing his own music, "Sometimes, I may get something in my head, like an idea or the mood of something that I would want, and I'm not always gonna get that by going through different tracks that other people have made. They don't know what's in my head. I think maybe it helps, a little bit, with diversity, the sound of it, but also, I would get something in my head and want to be able to lay down that idea from scratch." In 1998 when his beef with rapper Cage was still happening, New York rapper Necro (who had previously produced three songs for Cage) met Eminem and gave him a CD with the beat to what eventually became the beat for the song "Black Helicopters" by rap group Non-Phixion. Despite Eminem never using it, Necro still said positive things about Eminem and would appear on Shade45 years later.

== Public image ==
In 2002, the BBC said that the perception of Eminem as a "modern-day William Shakespeare" was comparable to the reception of Bob Dylan: "Not since Bob Dylan's heyday in the mid-1960s has an artist's output been subjected to such intense academic scrutiny as an exercise in contemporary soul-searching. US critics point to [Eminem's] vivid portraits of disenfranchised lives—using the stark, direct language of the street—as an accurate reflection of social injustice." In addition, the BBC wrote, "Where parents once recoiled in horror [from his music], there now seems a greater willingness to acknowledge a music that is striking such a chord among the American young, angry white underclass."

Eminem uses alter egos in his songs for different rapping styles and subject matter, including Slim Shady and Ken Kaniff, among others. Throughout his career, he has had highly publicized lyrical feuds with recording artists. Some of Eminem's lyrics have been criticized as homophobic, and an Australian politician attempted to ban him from the country. Eminem denies the charge, saying that when he was growing up words such as "faggot" and "queer" were used generally in a derogatory manner and not specifically toward homosexuals. Eminem is a friend of openly gay singer Elton John, and publicly supports gay rights.

== Legacy ==
Eminem is one of the best-selling artists in music history, easily the biggest crossover success ever seen in rap. To call him hip-hop's Elvis is correct to a degree, but it's largely inaccurate. Certainly, he was the first white rapper since the Beastie Boys to garner both sales and critical respect, but his impact has exceeded this confining distinction.

— Stephen Thomas Erlewine

Having greatly popularized hip-hop with Middle American audiences, Eminem is widely credited for the acceptance of white rappers in popular music. His often anger-fueled music channels the widespread angst of the American underclass.

In 2002, Stephen Hill, then vice president of the African American-themed television network BET (Black Entertainment Television), said:

Eminem gets a pass in the same vein that back during segregation black folks had to be better than average, had to be the best, to be accepted ... he is better than the best. In his own way, he is the best lyricist, alliterator and enunciator out there in hip-hop music. In terms of rapping about the pain that other disenfranchised people feel, there is no one better at their game than Eminem.

In Spin in 2002, rock critic Alan Light compared Eminem to John Lennon:

Eminem is even starting to bear a resemblance to one of those rock icons ... Marshall Mathers is becoming something like this generation's John Lennon ... Lennon and Eminem were both subjects of pickets and protests; they both wrote songs about troubled relationships with their mothers; they both wrote about their strange public lives with their wives; they both wrote about how much they loved their kids. Lennon, of course, was able to find ways to use his voice to advocate for peace rather than just blasting away at litigious family members and various pop stars, but still, few other pop musicians since Lennon have found a way to render their private psychodramas into compelling art as effectively as Eminem.

Of his rehearsal with Eminem for the "Stan" duet at the 2001 Grammy Awards, Elton John said, "[When] Eminem made his entrance, I got goose bumps the likes of which I have not felt since I first saw Jimi Hendrix, Mick Jagger, James Brown, and Aretha Franklin. Eminem was that good. I just thought, 'Fuck, this man is amazing'. There are very few performers who can grab you like that the first time—only the greats." John added, "Eminem is a true poet of his time, someone we'll be talking about for decades to come. He tells stories in such a powerful and distinctive way. As a lyricist, he's one of the best ever. Eminem does for his audience what [Bob] Dylan did for his: He writes how he feels. His anger, vulnerability and humor come out." Dylan praised Eminem in a 2022 interview with The Wall Street Journal.

Eminem has been credited with boosting the careers of hip-hop protégés such as 50 Cent, Yelawolf, Stat Quo, Royce da 5'9", Cashis, Obie Trice, Bobby Creekwater, and Boogie, and hip-hop groups such as D12 and Slaughterhouse. Many artists have cited him as an influence, including:

- The Weeknd
- Usher
- Rae Sremmurd
- Logic
- Joyner Lucas
- Lil Wayne
- 50 Cent
- Kendrick Lamar
- Ed Sheeran
- J. Cole
- Chance the Rapper
- Regina Spektor
- Lana Del Rey
- Juice WRLD
- Cordae
- Tyler, the Creator
- Kanye West
- Jack Harlow
- Drake
- Nicki Minaj
- Danny Brown
- Jhené Aiko
- Big Sean
- Camila Cabello
- Charlie Puth
- Loren Gray
- Kiiara
- Hopsin
- Machine Gun Kelly
- NF
- Russ
- Justina Valentine
- BTS
- DaBaby
- Tyga
- Bebe Rexha
- Ananya Birla
- Jelly Roll
- Skylar Grey
- XXXTentacion
- Mac Miller
- Takeoff
- Rico Nasty
- Yungblud
- B.o.B
- Frank Ocean
- Demi Lovato
- Eladio Carrión
- Baby Smoove
- Dean Lewis
- Jessie Reyez
- Ateez
- That Mexican OT
- Doechii
- Ab-Soul

== Other ventures ==
=== Shady Records ===
Following Eminem's multiplatinum record sales, Interscope offered him his own label; he and Paul Rosenberg founded Shady Records in late 1999. Eminem signed his Detroit collective, D12 and rapper Obie Trice to the label and signed 50 Cent in a 2002 joint venture with Dr. Dre's Aftermath label. In 2003, Eminem and Dr. Dre added Atlanta rapper Stat Quo to the Shady-Aftermath roster. DJ Green Lantern, Eminem's former DJ, was with Shady Records until a dispute related to the 50 Cent-Jadakiss feud forced him to leave the label. The Alchemist is currently Eminem's tour DJ. In 2005 Eminem signed another Atlanta rapper, Bobby Creekwater and West Coast rapper Cashis to Shady Records.

On December 5, 2006, the compilation album Eminem Presents: The Re-Up was released on Shady Records. The project began as a mixtape, but when Eminem found the material better than expected he released it as an album. The Re-Up was intended to introduce Stat Quo, Cashis and Bobby Creekwater. While he was recording Infinite, Eminem, Proof and Kon Artis assembled a group of fellow rappers now known as D12, short for "Detroit Twelve" or "Dirty Dozen", who performed in a style similar to Wu-Tang Clan. In 2001 D12's debut album, Devil's Night, was released. After their debut, D12 took a three-year break from the studio. They reunited in 2004 for their second album, D12 World, which included the hit singles "My Band" and "How Come" According to D12 member Bizarre, Eminem was not featured on his album Blue Cheese & Coney Island because "he's busy doing his thing".

=== Shade 45 ===
Eminem established his own satellite radio channel, Shade 45, that plays uncut hip-hop. Eminem also established a new morning show, Sway in the Morning with Sway Calloway, a lively morning show that airs at 8:00 a.m., Monday–Friday.

Eminem promoted the station in a 2004 mock national convention (the "Shady National Convention") at the Roseland Ballroom in New York City, in which Donald Trump endorsed him. On his album Revival (2017), Eminem expressed his regret at having collaborated with Trump, rapping, "wish I would have spit on it before I went to shake his hand at the event".

=== Mom's Spaghetti restaurant ===
On September 29, 2021, Eminem and Union Joints opened a spaghetti restaurant at 2131 Woodward Ave in Detroit. It is a reference to the lyrics "His palms are sweaty, knees weak, arms are heavy / There's vomit on his sweater already, mom's spaghetti" from the song "Lose Yourself" which became an internet meme. Mom's Spaghetti was previously a pop-up in Detroit in 2017 and at Coachella in 2018. In 2023, Eminem announced the launch of a "Mom's Spaghetti" jarred pasta sauce.

=== Acting career ===
After small roles in the 2001 film The Wash and as an extra in the 1998 Korn music video for "Got the Life" (during which he gave the band a demo tape), Eminem made his Hollywood debut in the semi-autobiographical 2002 film 8 Mile. He said it was a representation of growing up in Detroit rather than an account of his life. He recorded several new songs for the soundtrack, including "Lose Yourself" (which won an Academy Award for Best Original Song in 2003 and became the longest-running No. 1 hip-hop single in history). Eminem was absent from the ceremony and co-composer Luis Resto accepted the award.

Eminem voiced an aging, corrupt, AAVE-speaking police officer in the video game 50 Cent: Bulletproof and guested on the Comedy Central television show Crank Yankers and a Web cartoon, The Slim Shady Show. He played himself in the Entourage season-seven finale "Lose Yourself". He was signed to star in an unmade film version of Have Gun – Will Travel, and was considered for the lead roles in the films Jumper (2008), Elysium (2013), and Southpaw (2015). Eminem also had cameo appearances in the films Funny People (2009), The Interview (2014) and Happy Gilmore 2 (2025). In a 2010 interview with Jonathan Ross, he stated "You know, I love music so much. This is my passion, this is what I want to do. Not saying that I won't do a movie ever again, but this is me."

=== Charity work ===
Eminem established the Marshall Mathers Foundation to aid disadvantaged youth. The foundation works in conjunction with a charity founded by Norman Yatooma, a Detroit attorney. During the COVID-19 pandemic in 2020, Eminem donated a pair of Air Jordan 4 Retro Eminem Carhartt shoes, which are rare, to be raffled off with proceeds going to COVID-19 relief. That same year, he donated spaghetti meals to healthcare workers at Henry Ford Health System in Detroit, referencing the line "mom's spaghetti" from his song "Lose Yourself".

=== Advertising ===
Eminem appeared in two commercials which were shown during Super Bowl XLV. In the first, a one-minute spot for Lipton's Brisk iced tea, he is a claymation figure. In the second, a two-minute ad—the longest in Super Bowl history at the time—for the Chrysler 200, Eminem drives through Detroit (with "Lose Yourself" as the soundtrack) to his show at the Fox Theatre.

=== Books and memoirs ===
On November 21, 2000, Eminem published Angry Blonde, a non-fiction book featuring a commentary of several of his own songs, along with several previously unpublished photographs.

On October 21, 2008, his autobiography The Way I Am was published by Dutton Adult. The book is illustrated with never before published photos of Eminem's life. The autobiography is named after his 2000 song "The Way I Am". An autobiography of Eminem's mother, My Son Marshall, My Son Eminem, was published the following month.

== Personal life ==
=== Family and relationships ===
Eminem was married twice to Kimberly Anne Scott, whom he met in high school. Scott and her twin sister Dawn had run away from home; they moved in with Eminem and his mother when he was 15, and he began an on-and-off relationship with Scott on January 14, 1991. Their daughter, Hailie Jade, who is Mathers's only biological child, was born on December 25, 1995, and later became a social media influencer. Eminem legally adopted and was given custody of his former sister-in-law's daughter, Alaina Marie, as well as Scott's child from another father, Stevie Laine. He also raised his younger half-brother Nathan. He became a grandfather when Hailie gave birth to a son in 2025.

Mathers and Scott were married on June 14, 1999, and divorced on October 5, 2001. He and actress Brittany Murphy (who co-starred with him in 8 Mile) dated in the 2000s. In 2002, Eminem discussed being in a relationship with singer Mariah Carey, though she later denied they dated. He and Scott remarried on January 14, 2006, but filed for divorce again on April 5. They agreed to joint custody of Hailie and the divorce was finalized on December 19, 2006. In early 2010, Eminem denied tabloid reports that he and Scott had renewed their romantic relationship, though his representative confirmed they remained friendly.

In his 2013 song "Headlights", Eminem reiterated his love for his mother and apologized to her for some of the lyrics in his earlier songs, including "Cleanin' Out My Closet". His mother publicly paid tribute to him when he was inducted into the Rock and Roll Hall of Fame in November 2022. She died of complications from lung cancer in December 2024.

=== Health problems ===
Eminem has spoken publicly about his addiction to prescription drugs, including Vicodin, Ambien, and Valium. During the production of 8 Mile, he developed insomnia while working 16 hours a day. An associate gave him an Ambien tablet which "knocked [him] out", encouraging him to obtain a prescription. This was Eminem's first experience of drug addiction, which affected him for several years. Near the end of production on Encore, he would "just go into the studio and goof off [with] a pocketful of pills". Eminem began taking the drugs to "feel normal", taking a "ridiculous amount ... I could consume anywhere from 40 to 60 Valium [in a day]. Vicodin, maybe 30." The drugs would put him to sleep for no more than two hours, after which he would take more. Eminem's weight increased to 230 pounds (100 kg) and he was regularly eating fast food: "The kids behind the counter knew me—it wouldn't even faze them. Or I'd sit up at Denny's or Big Boy and just eat by myself. It was sad." Eminem became less recognizable due to his weight gain and once overheard two teenagers arguing about whether or not it was him: "Eminem ain't fat."

Over the holidays, Marshall Mathers, a.k.a. Eminem, was under doctors' care at Detroit-area hospitals for complications due to pneumonia. He has since been released and is doing well recovering at home.

— Interscope Records statement in January 2008 regarding Eminem's hospitalisation

In December 2007, Eminem was hospitalized after an accidental methadone overdose. He had obtained the pills from a dealer who told him they were "just like Vicodin, and easier on [your] liver". Eminem used the pills until, one night, he collapsed in his bathroom and was rushed to the hospital. According to Eminem, doctors told him he had ingested the equivalent of "four bags of heroin" and was "about two hours from dying" if he had not received treatment. After missing Christmas with his children, Hailie, Alaina and Stevie, Eminem checked himself out of the facility, weak and not fully detoxed. He tore the meniscus in his knee after falling asleep on his sofa, requiring surgery; after he returned home, he had a seizure. His drug use "ramped right back to where it was before" within a month. Eminem began to attend church meetings to get clean, but after he was asked for autographs he sought help from a rehabilitation counselor. He began an exercise program that emphasized running. Elton John was a mentor during this period, calling Eminem once a week to check on him. Eminem has been sober since April 20, 2008.

=== Threats ===
In April 2020, Matthew David Hughes, a 26-year-old man, broke into Eminem's house in Clinton Township, Macomb County, Michigan, breaking a kitchen window with a brick paver. Eminem woke up with Hughes standing behind him and Hughes said that he was there to kill Eminem. Hughes was charged with multiple offences; his defense attorney opined that he seemed to be suffering from "mental issues". In a plea agreement in 2021, Hughes pleaded guilty to second-degree home invasion in exchange for dismissal of other charges; he was sentenced to probation and time served (524 days in the county jail). In 2019, Hughes had pleaded guilty to breaking into a Rochester Hills home in search of Eminem.

In August 2024, Hughes returned to Eminem's property and was again arrested. In May 2025, Hughes was convicted by a Macomb County jury of first-degree home invasion and aggravated stalking, stemming from both the 2020 and 2024 incidents. During the trial, Eminem testified about the intrusions. Hughes faced a sentence of 15–30 years in prison for home invasion and an additional 3–7½ years for stalking, to be served consecutively. Hughes received the maximum sentence, 15 to 35 years in prison, plus 3½ years to be served consecutively.

On August 30, 2023, it was revealed that the perpetrator of the 2023 Jacksonville shooting, Ryan Palmeter, denounced Eminem and Machine Gun Kelly in his manifesto for their involvement in rap, prior to committing a racially motivated shooting.

=== Politics ===
During the late 1990s and early 2000s, Eminem criticized prominent political figures from both the Democratic and Republican parties, including President Bill Clinton, First Lady Hillary Clinton, and Second Ladies Tipper Gore and Lynne Cheney, the latter two of whom were vocal opponents of violent and explicit lyrics in popular music. Ahead of the 2004 United States presidential election, he released the protest song "Mosh", which criticized then-President George W. Bush, although he did not endorse Democratic nominee John Kerry. He later expressed support for Barack Obama in a 2009 interview.

Eminem returned to overt political expression during the 2016 United States presidential election with the release of "Campaign Speech", a freestyle attacking Republican candidate Donald Trump. In 2017, he performed another anti-Trump freestyle, "The Storm", at the BET Hip Hop Awards, in which he supported NFL player Colin Kaepernick and the national anthem protests, and declared that any of his fans who supported Trump were no longer welcome. His political beliefs continued with the 2020 song "Darkness", which references the 2017 Las Vegas shooting and ends with a call for stricter gun control laws. That same year, he authorized the use of "Lose Yourself" in a campaign video for Joe Biden during the final week of the election.

Following the U.S. Supreme Court decision that overturned Roe v. Wade in 2022, Eminem expressed his opposition on social media, writing: "As a father it pisses me off that women have fewer rights 2day than just a few days ago... we r fuckin goin bckwards." He included a link to a Michigan-based pro-choice organization. In 2023, Eminem sent a cease and desist letter to Republican presidential candidate Vivek Ramaswamy requesting that he stop performing "Lose Yourself" at campaign events. During the 2024 United States presidential election, Eminem publicly endorsed Kamala Harris. In October 2024, he appeared at a rally at Huntington Place in Detroit, where he spoke about the importance of voter turnout in Michigan and voiced support for Harris's stance on civil liberties and freedom of expression.

=== Faith and beliefs ===
Eminem has referenced Christianity in his music. On the remix of Kanye West and DJ Khaled's 2022 track "Use This Gospel", he uses explicitly Christian lyrics, thanking Jesus and rapping about salvation. The song topped the Billboard Christian Songs chart, and commentators described his verse as "Jesus‑heavy" and reflecting a faith‑based perspective.

== Achievements and honors ==
With global sales of over 220 million records, Eminem is one of the best-selling music artists ever. He has had eleven number-one albums on the Billboard 200 and was the first artist to have ten consecutive albums debut atop the chart. He was the bestselling music artist from 2000 to 2009 in the U.S. according to Nielsen SoundScan. He was also the bestselling male music artist in the United States of the 2010s. He has sold 47.4 million albums in the country and 107.5 million singles in the US. The Marshall Mathers LP, The Eminem Show, Curtain Call: The Hits, "Lose Yourself", "Love the Way You Lie" and "Not Afraid" have all been certified Diamond or higher by the Recording Industry Association of America (RIAA). Eminem has over ten billion views of his music videos on his YouTube Vevo page, and in 2014 Spotify named him the most-streamed music artist ever.

Among Eminem's awards is 15 Grammy Awards, eight American Music Awards and 17 Billboard Music Awards, Billboard named him the "Artist of the Decade (2000–2009)". In 2013, he received the Global Icon Award at that year's MTV Europe Music Awards ceremony. His success in 8 Mile saw him win the 2002 Academy Award for Best Original Song for his song "Lose Yourself", co-written with Jeff Bass and Luis Resto, making him the first rapper to receive the award. He also won the MTV Movie & TV Awards for Best Actor in a Movie and Best Breakthrough Performance and the Critics' Choice Movie Award for Best Song for "Lose Yourself". In 2022, his performance at the Super Bowl LVI halftime show won him the Primetime Emmy Award for Outstanding Variety Special (Live). With this win, Eminem is just missing a Tony Award from achieving the EGOT, joining the elite circle of artists who have won all four major American entertainment awards.

Eminem has also been included and ranked in several publications' lists. Rolling Stone included him in its list of the 100 Greatest Artists of All Time and the 100 Greatest Songwriters of All Time. He was ranked 9th on MTV's Greatest MCs of All Time list. He was ranked 13th on MTV's 22 Greatest Voices in Music list and 79th on the VH1 100 Greatest Artists of All Time lists. He was ranked 82nd on Rolling Stone's "The Immortals" list. In 2010, MTV Portugal ranked Eminem the 7th biggest icon in popular music history. In 2012, The Source ranked him 6th on their list of the Top 50 Lyricists of All Time, while About.com ranked him 7th on its list of the 50 Greatest MCs of Our Time (1987–2007). In 2015, Eminem was placed third on "The 10 Best Rappers of All Time" list by Billboard. In 2008, Vibe readers named Eminem the Best Rapper Alive. In 2011, Eminem was labeled the "King of Hip-Hop" by Rolling Stone based on an analysis of album sales, chart positions, YouTube views, social media following, concert grosses, industry awards and critical ratings of solo rappers who released music from 2009 to the first half of 2011.

Eminem was also inducted in the Rock and Roll Hall of Fame Class of 2022.

== Literary works ==
Eminem's published works
Title	Year	Pages
Angry Blonde	2000	148
The Way I Am	2008	208

== Discography ==
- Infinite (1996)
- The Slim Shady LP (1999)
- The Marshall Mathers LP (2000)
- The Eminem Show (2002)
- Encore (2004)
- Relapse (2009)
- Recovery (2010)
- The Marshall Mathers LP 2 (2013)
- Revival (2017)
- Kamikaze (2018)
- Music to Be Murdered By (2020)
- The Death of Slim Shady (Coup de Grâce) (2024)

== Tours ==
=== Headlining ===
- The Slim Shady LP Tour (1999)
- The Recovery Tour (2010–2013)
- Rapture Tour (2014)
- Revival Tour (2018)
- 2019 Rapture Tour (2019)
- Middle East Tour (2024)

=== Co-headlining ===
- Up in Smoke Tour (with Dr. Dre, Snoop Dogg, Ice Cube and others) (2000)
- Anger Management Tour (with Limp Bizkit and Papa Roach) (2002–2005)
- The Home & Home Tour (with Jay-Z) (2010)
- The Monster Tour (with Rihanna) (2014)

== See also ==
- Artists with the most number-one European singles
- Global Recording Artist of the Year – Award for commercial success in music
- Honorific nicknames in popular music
- List of American Grammy Award winners and nominees
- List of artists who reached number one in the United States
- List of artists who reached number one on the UK singles chart
- List of best-selling albums of the 21st century
- List of best-selling singles
- List of best-selling singles in the United States
- List of highest-certified music artists in the United States
- List of most-subscribed YouTube channels
- Mononymous person
- Transgressive art – Art that intends to outrage or violate basic morals and sensibilities

== Notes ==
Awards
Preceded by "If I Didn't Have You" from Monsters, Inc. by Randy Newman	Academy Award for Best Original Song; 2003	Succeeded by "Into the West" from Return of the King by Fran Walsh, Howard Shore and Annie Lennox
Preceded by Mariah Carey	Billboard Artist of the Decade; 2000s	Succeeded by Drake
