= Bass Brothers =

American music producers

- Also known as: F.B.T. Productions
- Origin: Ferndale, Michigan and Detroit, Michigan, U.S.
- Genres: Hip hop
- Occupation: Record producer
- Years active: 1984–present
- Labels: F.B.T. Productions; Web; Elektra; Qwest; Shady
- Members: Jeffrey "Jeff" Bass; Mark "Marky" Bass

The Bass Brothers are an American record producer brother duo comprising Mark and Jeff Bass. They were responsible for helping Eminem with the creation of Infinite. Before that, they worked with George Clinton. Tracks from those sessions ended up on the P-Funk All Stars album Dope Dogs. Jeff Bass is considered one of the most influential people in Eminem's career. On their work with Eminem, Mark and Jeff Bass are credited as F.B.T. Productions.

== Work ==
Although Interscope Records marketed Dr. Dre as Eminem's major producer, the Bass Brothers have in fact produced more individual tracks for Eminem than Dr. Dre. Jeff Bass performed the "Public Service Announcements" that introduce both The Slim Shady LP and The Marshall Mathers LP. Most recently, he performed the "Another Public Service Announcement" from D12's album Devil's Night when he got punched by Rondell Beene, who replaces him as the announcer for that album.

Most of Eminem's hit singles have been either produced by Dre ("My Name Is", "The Real Slim Shady", and "Just Lose It") or Jeff Bass ("Without Me", "Beautiful", and "Lose Yourself").

Both have won Grammy Awards for their work with Eminem. Jeff Bass won a Best Original Song Oscar in 2003 for co-writing "Lose Yourself" from the film 8 Mile.

The Bass Brothers also own a record label called WEB Entertainment, which has signed both rock and hip hop acts.

Mark Bass: "In 1990, Jeffrey and I landed a deal to produce a hip-hop rap project called Tycie & Woody for Elektra Records, operating for the first time as the 'Funky Bass Brothers [later changing to F.B.T. (Funky Bass Team) due to the addition of Mike Wilder to the team].' We met George Clinton and started working as a production team for George and for his label, Westbound Records. Unfortunately, most of the acts that we produced for Westbound were never released, and we feel it was some of our best work. Generally speaking, we always worked with black artists, although not intentionally. That changed, of course, when Mark heard a white rapper named M&M freestyle on a local radio show in 1992 and invited him to the studio for free time."

The song "Touchdown" off T.I.'s album T.I. vs. T.I.P. released in 2007, featuring Eminem was produced by Eminem and Jeff Bass. Mark produced George Clinton's album, George Clinton and His Gangsters of Love released September 16, 2008. In 2009 Jeff co-produced the fifth single "Beautiful" off Eminem's album Relapse.

Although the brothers no longer do significant production for Eminem, the rapper has stated that they maintain a positive and close relationship.

== IPO announcement ==
In September 2017, the Bass Brothers and manager Joel Martin announced a plan to sell either 15% or 25% of their sound recording royalties, including their interest in the 1999 – 2013 Eminem catalog, to a company called Royalty Flow. Royalty Flow, a subsidiary of Royalty Exchange, filed under SEC Regulation A+ to conduct an equity crowdfunding campaign to raise the money needed to buy the catalog.

== Business ventures ==
- Bassmint Productions
- Mashin' Duck Records
- Web Entertainment

== See also ==
- F.B.T. Productions, LLC v. Aftermath Records
