= Role Model (song) =

Single by Eminem

from the album The Slim Shady LP
- Released: May 26, 1999
- Recorded: March 1998
- Genre: Comedy hip hop; horrorcore
- Length: 3:25 (album version); 3:22 (radio version)
- Label: Aftermath; Interscope; Web
- Songwriters: Marshall Mathers; Andre Young; Melvin Bradford
- Producers: Dr. Dre; Mel-Man

Eminem singles chronology
| "My Name Is" (1999) | "Role Model" (1999) | "Guilty Conscience" (1999) |

Music video
- "Role Model" on YouTube

"Role Model" is a song by American rapper Eminem that features on his major-label debut album The Slim Shady LP (1999). It was later released as a single on May 26, 1999. A music video was made, using the heavily censored radio edit. It became a minor hit on the US charts. "Role Model" was written and produced by Eminem himself, Dr. Dre, and Mel-Man.

"Role Model" received positive reviews from music critics, who praised the song for Eminem best tackling how others perceive him, as well as Dr. Dre's production.

The song also appears on the deluxe edition of his compilation album, Curtain Call: The Hits. In 2023, a sample of "Role Model" was used for the Lyrical Lemonade track "Doomsday", with rappers Juice WRLD and Cordae, off the album All Is Yellow (2024). Eminem appeared on a sequel to the track, also appearing on the same album.

== Critical reception ==
David Browne described this: "In 'Role Model', he gleefully debunks the idea of rappers as heroes (So if I said I never do drugs, that would mean I lie and get f ---ed more than the President does)." RapReviews highlighted the following lyrics: "I get a clean shave, bathe, go to a rave/ Die from an overdose and dig myself up out of my grave/ My middle finger won't go down, how do I wave?/ And this is how I'm supposed to teach kids how to behave?"

== Music video ==
The video is a darker comedic offering than "My Name Is", directed by Dr. Dre and Phillip G. Atwell. The opening of the song, where Eminem announces his attempt to drown himself, is left out. In the video, there's a scene where Eminem is transformed into an animated superhero and attacks a chicken character that resembles Foghorn Leghorn from Looney Tunes. Also in the music video Eminem jokes about the OJ Simpson's trial where he says that O.J. Simpson's friend Marcus Allen and Eminem framed O.J. for the murder and he says "We did it!" and runs up to the camera leaving behind a glove and his hands are bloody.

== Track listing ==
Promotional CD single

| No. | Title | Length |
|---|---|---|
| 1. | "Role Model" (Radio Version) | 3:22 |
| 2. | "Role Model" (Album Version) | 3:25 |

12" vinyl

| No. | Title | Length |
|---|---|---|
| 1. | "Role Model" (Radio Version) | 3:22 |
| 2. | "Role Model" (Album Version) | 3:25 |
| 3. | "Role Model" (Instrumental) | 3:17 |
| 4. | "Cum on Everybody" (Club Edit) | 3:13 |
| 5. | "Cum on Everybody (featuring Dina Rae)" (Album Version) | 3:40 |
| 6. | "'97 Bonnie & Clyde" (Club Edit) | 3:49 |

== Charts ==
| Chart (1999) | Peak position |
|---|---|
| US Bubbling Under R&B/Hip-Hop Singles (Billboard) | 11 |

== Certifications ==
| Region | Certification | Certified units/sales |
|---|---|---|
| Australia (ARIA) | Platinum | 70,000^{‡} |
| New Zealand (RMNZ) | Gold | 15,000^{‡} |
| United Kingdom (BPI) | Silver | 200,000^{‡} |
| United States (RIAA) | Gold | 500,000^{‡} |
^{‡} Sales+streaming figures based on certification alone.
