= Doomsday (Lyrical Lemonade, Juice Wrld and Cordae song) =

2023 single by Lyrical Lemonade, Juice Wrld, and Cordae

Single by Lyrical Lemonade, Juice Wrld, and Cordae

from the album All Is Yellow
- Released: June 23, 2023
- Recorded: 2019
- Genre: Hip-hop
- Length: 2:30
- Label: Lyrical Lemonade; Def Jam
- Songwriters: Cole Bennett; Jarad Higgins; Cordae Dunston; Marshall Mathers III; Andre Young; Melvin Bradford; Max Lord
- Producers: Bennett; Lord; Young; Bradford; Lance Nicholas

Lyrical Lemonade singles chronology
"Doomsday" (2023)	"Guitar in My Room" (2023)

Juice Wrld singles chronology
"The Light" (2023)	"Doomsday" (2023)	"Lace It" (2023)

Cordae singles chronology
"Two Tens" (2023)	"Doomsday" (2023)

Music video
- "Doomsday" on YouTube

"Doomsday" is a song released by American music video company Lyrical Lemonade, performed by American rappers Juice Wrld and Cordae. It was released through Lyrical Lemonade and Def Jam as a single on June 23, 2023. It is the debut single by Lyrical Lemonade and the lead single from their debut album, All Is Yellow (2024).

The song was produced by Cole Bennett of Lyrical Lemonade and Max Lord, both of whom wrote the song with the rappers; the song also contains samples of American rapper Eminem's single, "Role Model", from The Slim Shady LP (1999), which resulted in him and its producers, Dr. Dre and Mel-Man, also being credited as songwriters on "Doomsday".

== Doomsday Pt. 2 ==
"Doomsday Pt. 2"

Song by Lyrical Lemonade and Eminem

from the album All Is Yellow
- Released: January 26, 2024
- Genre: Hip-hop
- Length: 1:51
- Label: Lyrical Lemonade; Def Jam; Universal
- Songwriters: Daniyel Weissmann; John Nocito; Marshall Mathers III; Luis Resto; Melvin Bradford; Andre Young
- Producers: Daniyel; Bennett; Nocito; Kosher World; Young; Bradford

Music video
- "Doomsday Pt. 2" on YouTube

"Doomsday Pt. 2" is the sequel to "Doomsday", and features Eminem. Eminem's verse is a diss at Benzino, whom he has been involved in a highly publicized feud with since 2003. He also mentions Benzino's daughter Coi Leray.

=== Response ===
In response to Eminem's verse, Benzino released the diss track "Rap Elvis" within 2 days of the "Doomsday Pt. 2" release. The song was allegedly ghostwritten. Rapper Ness Lee claimed he was the original writer.

== Charts ==
Chart performance for "Doomsday"
Chart (2023)	Peak position
Canada Hot 100 (Billboard)	49
Global 200 (Billboard)	150
Ireland (IRMA)	83
New Zealand Hot Singles (RMNZ)	3
UK Singles (OCC)	92
US Billboard Hot 100	58
US Hot R&B/Hip-Hop Songs (Billboard)	19

Chart performance for "Doomsday Pt. 2"
Chart (2024)	Peak position
New Zealand Hot Singles (RMNZ)	16

== Certifications ==
Certifications for "Doomsday"
Region	Certification	Certified units/sales
United States (RIAA)	Gold	500,000^{‡}
^{‡} Sales+streaming figures based on certification alone.
