= Servitto =

Servitto is a surname. Notable people with the surname include:

- Deborah Servitto (born 1956), American judge
- Matt Servitto (born 1965), American actor
