= All Is Yellow =

Studio album by Lyrical Lemonade
- Released: January 26, 2024
- Recorded: 2019–2023
- Genres: Hip-hop; pop
- Length: 42:38
- Labels: Lyrical Lemonade; Def Jam
- Producers: Cole Bennett (exec.); Daniyel; John Nocito; Harris Fecony; Marvy Ayy; Car!ton; Kosher World; Rewined; Emerson Poulin; 18yoman; Chelsea Warner; Chief Keef; Jacob Wice; Juicy J; Crazy Mike; Jasu; Jonnywood; Doc Daniel; Max Lord; Gus Dapperton; Jacob Lincoln; Fred Ball; Umi; Hollywood Cole; Daz; Rascal; Matthew Tavares; Angel Lopez

Singles from All Is Yellow
- 1. "Doomsday" Released: June 23, 2023; 2. "Guitar in My Room" Released: September 29, 2023; 3. "Hello There" Released: October 20, 2023; 4. "Stop Giving Me Advice" Released: December 8, 2023; 5. "Fallout" Released: January 12, 2024

All Is Yellow is the debut studio album (Note: Many sources dispute this as either a studio album or a compilation album.) by multimedia production company Lyrical Lemonade, executive produced by the company's founder, American music video director Cole Bennett. It was released on January 26, 2024, via Lyrical Lemonade, and distributed by Def Jam Recordings. It features appearances by many prominent hip-hop artists.

The album was preceded by five singles, including the lead single "Doomsday". The track sees collaborators Juice Wrld and Cordae rapping over a Cole Bennett- and Max Lord-produced beat, which features a sample of Eminem's "Role Model" from his own debut album The Slim Shady LP (1999). "Doomsday" peaked at 58 on the Billboard Hot 100 and 19 on the company's Hot R&B/Hip-Hop Songs chart.

== Background ==
Work on All Is Yellow began at least five years before its release. Five singles were released prior to the album, the first being "Doomsday" in June 2023. That September, the second single, "Guitar in My Room", was released. The third, being "Hello There", was released in October. The fourth, "Stop Giving Me Advice", was the second single from the album to chart in the United Kingdom; however, it failed to chart in the United States. It was released on December 8. On January 12, 2024, Bennett released the final pre-album single, titled "Fallout". Bennett directed videos for all five singles, which were subsequently released on the Lyrical Lemonade YouTube channel. On the day of the album's release, the track "Say Ya Grace" received a video. Cole Bennett released the music videos for all of the other songs in the following months, including "Doomsday Pt. 2".

The album features numerous guest performances, with vocals being provided by JID, Sheck Wes, Ski Mask the Slump God, Lil Durk, Kid Cudi, Chief Keef, Lil Yachty, Lil Tecca, The Kid Laroi, Lil Skies, Teezo Touchdown, Juicy J, Cochise, Denzel Curry, Lil B, Latto, Swae Lee, Aminé, Snot, the late 6 Dogs, the late Juice Wrld, Cordae, Eminem, Gus Dapperton, Joey Badass, G Herbo, BabyTron, Lil Tracy, Corbin, Black Kray, Umi, SahBabii, Dave, and Jack Harlow.

Additionally, Big Sean recorded a verse for the album on an unreleased track alongside Curry; however, it did not end up making the final tracklist, with Bennett indicating alternate plans for it to be released on another album in the future. In July 2024, a reworked version of the song by Eminem featuring Sean and BabyTron was released under the name "Tobey". It is the second single off the former's twelfth studio album The Death of Slim Shady (Coup de Grâce).

== Critical reception ==
Professional ratings
Review scores
Source	Rating
HipHopDX	2.6/5
Pitchfork	5.1/10

All Is Yellow received mixed reviews from music critics. Writing for HipHopDX, Will Schube felt that Bennett, rather than using the album as an opportunity to "put impressive artists into interesting scenarios and seeing what they do", filled the album with "clichés of pastiche styles", writing: "There are plenty of good moments on the project, but these high points only reveal how much more interesting All Is Yellow could have been." Dani Blum of Pitchfork called it an "inevitable, overstuffed album with a lot of big-name features and little curatorial vision."

== Track listing ==
All Is Yellow track listing
No.	Title	Writer(s)	Producer(s)	Length
1.	"Fly Away" (with Sheck Wes, Ski Mask the Slump God, and JID)	Daniyel Weissmann; John Nocito; Harris Fecony; Cole Bennett; Marvin Jordan; Khadimou Rassoul Cheikh Fall; Destin Choice Route; Stokeley Clevon Goulbourne; Carlton McDowell	Daniyel; Nocito; Fecony; Bennett; Marvy Ayy; Carlton; Kosher World	3:06
2.	"Guitar in My Room" (with Lil Durk and Kid Cudi)	McDowell; Reece Weinberg; Emerson Poulin; Bennett; Durk Banks; Jordan; Weissmann; Vincent Goodyer; Chelsea Warner; Scott Mescudi	Carlton; Rewined; Poulin; Marvy Ayy; Bennett; Daniyel; 18yoman; Warner; Kosher World	3:48
3.	"Say Ya Grace" (with Chief Keef and Lil Yachty)	Keith Cozart; Jordan; Bennett; McDowell; Miles Parks McCollum; Van McCoy; Chris Barnett; Tyree Pittman; Tyrone Pittman	Chief Keef; Marvy Ayy; Bennett; Carlton	2:37
4.	"This My Life" (with Lil Tecca, The Kid Laroi, and Lil Skies)	Weissmann; Jacob Wice-Budner; Jordan; McDowell; Bennett; Tyler-Justin Anthony Sharpe; Charlton Kenneth Jeffrey Howard; Kimetrius Christopher Foose	Daniyel; Jacob Wice; Marvy Ayy; Carlton; Bennett; Kosher World	2:49
5.	"First Night" (with Teezo Touchdown, Juicy J, Cochise, Denzel Curry, and Lil B)	Weissmann; Jordan Michael Houston; Jordan; McDowell; Bennett; Michael Foster; Paul Beauregard; Aaron Lashane Thomas; Terrell Anthony Cox; Denzel Rae Don Curry; Brandon McCartney	Juicy J; Daniyel; Marvy Ayy; Carlton; Bennett; Crazy Mike; Jacob Wice; Kosher World	3:38
6.	"Special" (with Latto, Swae Lee, and Aminé)	Weissmann; Bennett; Jordan; McDowell; Alyssa Michelle Stephens; Khalif Malik Ibn Shaman Brown; Adam Aminé Daniel	Daniyel; Bennett; Marvy Ayy; Carlton; Kosher World	2:37
7.	"With the Fish" (with Snot and 6 Dogs)	Jassu Mallory; Jonathan Birkner; Paul Daniel; Edy Junior Edouard; Ronald Chase Amick	Jassu; Jonnywood; Doc Daniel	2:11
8.	"Doomsday" (with Juice Wrld and Cordae)	Bennett; Jarad Higgins; Cordae Dunston; Max Lord; Melvin Charles Bradford; Marshall Mathers; Andre Young	Lord; Bennett	2:31
9.	"Doomsday Pt. 2" (with Eminem)	Weissmann; Bennett; Nocito; Mathers; Luis Resto; Bradford; Young	Daniyel; Bennett; Noctio; Kosher World; Eminem^{[a]}	1:51
10.	"Fallout" (with Gus Dapperton, Lil Yachty, and Joey Badass)	Weissmann; Jacob Lincoln; Brendan Rice; Bennett; Jo-Vaughn Scott; McCollum	Gus Dapperton; Daniyel; Lincoln; Bennett; Kosher World	3:37
11.	"Equilibrium" (with G Herbo and BabyTron)	McDowell; Jordan; Bennett; Weissmann; James Edward Johnson IV; Herbert Randall Wright III	Carlton; Marvy Ayy; Daniyel; Bennett; Kosher World	3:04
12.	"Hello There" (with Lil Tracy, Corbin, and Black Kray)	Jazz Ishmael Butler; Corbin Smidzik; Timothy Mills; Weissmann; Jordan; McDowell; Bennett; Lincoln; Travis Barker; Thomas DeLonge; Mark Hoppus	Daniyel; Marvy Ayy; Carlton; Bennett; Lincoln; Kosher World	3:15
13.	"Hummingbird" (with Umi, SahBabii, and Teezo Touchdown)	Fred Ball; Tierra Umi Wilson; Saaheem Malik Valdery; Thomas	Ball; Umi; Daniyel^{[c]}; V Ron^{[c]}	3:33
14.	"Stop Giving Me Advice" (with Jack Harlow and Dave)	Kameron Cole; Davud Ahmedzade; Tobias Breuer; Matthew Tavares; José Velázquez; Jackman Thomas Harlow; David Orobosa Omoregie	Hollywood Cole; Daz; Rascal; Tavares; Angel Lopez	4:02
Total length:				42:38

Notes

- ^{^[c]} signifies a co-producer
- ^{^[a]} signifies an additional producer
- "Doomsday" samples "Role Model", performed by Eminem.
- "Doomsday Pt. 2" interpolates "Doomsday".
- "Hello There" interpolates "I Miss You", performed by Blink-182.

== Personnel ==
Musicians

- Marvy Ayy – bass guitar, drums, guitar, keyboards, percussion (tracks 1, 3–6, 13); programming (1, 3, 4, 11, 13), background vocals (6, 11)
- Daniyel – bass guitar, drums, guitar, percussion (tracks 1, 4, 5); percussion (1, 4), background vocals (4)
- Carlton McDowell – background vocals (tracks 2, 4–6, 11), programming (2, 4, 11, 12), drums, keyboards (3–6, 11, 12); bass guitar, guitar (3–6, 11); percussion (3, 4, 6, 11, 12)
- Emerson Poulin – background vocals, programming (track 2)
- Reece Weinberg – background vocals, programming (track 2)
- Mike "Crazy Mike" Foster – keyboards (track 5)
- Eric Carlson – piano (track 5)
- Jonnywood – bass guitar, drums, keyboards, percussion, programming (track 7)
- Doc Daniel – bass guitar, drums, percussion, programming (track 7)
- Jaasu – drums, percussion, programming (track 7)
- Luis Resto – keyboards (track 9)
- Gus Dapperton – guitar, keyboards (track 10)
- Jacob Lincoln – guitar (track 12)
- Angel Lopez – background vocals, bass guitar, drums, guitar, keyboards, percussion, programming (track 14)
- Hollywood Cole – background vocals, bass guitar, drums, guitar, keyboards, percussion, programming (track 14)
- Mario Luciano – background vocals, bass guitar, drums, guitar, keyboards, percussion, programming (track 14)
- Matthew Tavares – background vocals, bass guitar, drums, guitar, keyboards, percussion (track 14)
- Tobias Breuer – background vocals, bass guitar, drums, guitar, keyboards, percussion (track 14)

Technical

- Marvy Ayy – mastering (tracks 1–8, 10–12), mixing (1–7, 11, 12)
- Brian "Big Bass" Gardner – mastering (track 9)
- V Ron – mastering, mixing (track 13)
- Colin Leonard – mastering (track 14)
- Jonnywood – mixing (track 7)
- Max Lord – mixing, engineering (track 8)
- Mike Strange – mixing, engineering (track 9)
- Nathan Phillips – mixing (track 10)
- Nickie Jon Pabon – mixing, engineering (track 14)
- Tony Campana – engineering (track 9)
- Carlton McDowell – engineering (track 12)
- Matthew Tavares – engineering (track 14)
- Ben Hogarth – vocal engineering (track 6)

== Charts ==
Chart performance for All Is Yellow
Chart (2024)	Peak position
Australian Albums (ARIA)	86
Australian Hip Hop/R&B Albums (ARIA)	21
Belgian Albums (Ultratop Flanders)	145
Canadian Albums (Billboard)	51
New Zealand Albums (RMNZ)	23
Portuguese Albums (AFP)	113
US Billboard 200	43
US Top R&B/Hip-Hop Albums (Billboard)	16
