= '97 Bonnie & Clyde =

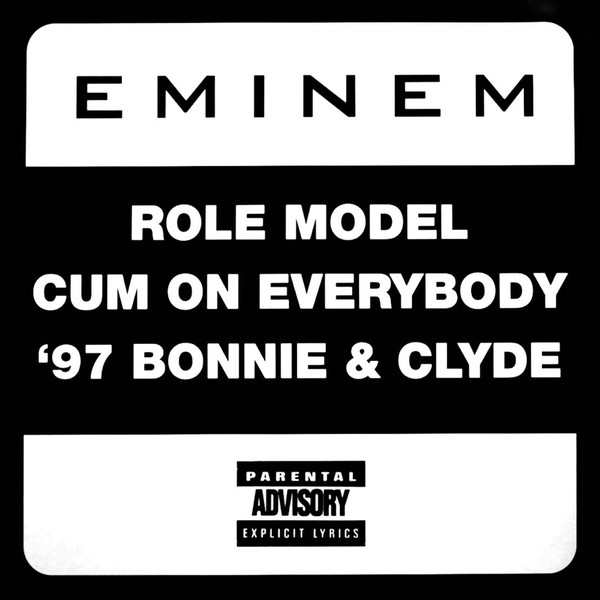
- Promotional cover art

Song by Eminem

from the album Slim Shady EP and The Slim Shady LP
- Released: February 12, 1998 (Slim Shady EP version); November 2, 1999 (The Slim Shady LP version)
- Recorded: 1997
- Genre: Horrorcore
- Length: 4:20 ("Just the Two of Us"); 5:16 ("'97 Bonnie & Clyde")
- Label: Aftermath; Interscope; Web
- Songwriters: Marshall Mathers; Jeff Bass; Mark Bass
- Producers: DJ Head (pre.); Bass Brothers; Eminem (co.)

"'97 Bonnie & Clyde" is a song by the American rapper Eminem. The song appears on the Slim Shady EP (as "Just the Two of Us") and The Slim Shady LP. Eminem recorded a prequel for The Marshall Mathers LP, "Kim". The song was covered by Tori Amos on her 2001 album of gender-swapped covers, Strange Little Girls.

== Background ==
The song has Eminem disposing of the corpse of his ex-wife, Kim Mathers, in the lake with his then-infant daughter Hailie. The sounds played at the beginning of the song, including the jingling of keys and the slamming of a car door, imply that Eminem put Kim's body in the trunk of his car. These are the same sounds played at the end of the song "Kim" by Eminem. In "Kim", the sounds are heard immediately after the lines end. Eminem got the idea to write this song at a time when Kim was stopping him from seeing his daughter. Eminem asked Marilyn Manson to guest appear on the song, but the singer declined because he felt that the song was "too misogynistic".

Because the song focuses on disposing of Kim's corpse, Eminem was not comfortable with explaining the situation to Kim, and instead told her that he would be taking Hailie to Chuck E. Cheese's, when he actually wanted to go to the studio with Hailie and feature her vocals in the song. He explained, "When she found out I used our daughter to write a song about killing her, she fucking blew. We had just got back together for a couple of weeks. Then I played her the song and she bugged the fuck out." Eminem also said, "When she (Hailie) gets old enough, I'm going to explain it to her. I'll let her know that Mommy and Daddy weren't getting along at the time. None of it was to be taken too literally, although at the time I wanted to fucking do it."

== Critical response ==
AllMusic highlighted and praised the song: "notorious track where he imagines killing his wife and then disposing of the body with his baby daughter in tow" and critic noted that this song is connected with Eminem's life struggles. Steve "Flash" Juon called the remix bad and he continued, "[It is] lifeless and oddly out of place among an album full of mostly dope cuts." Rob Sheffield wrote, "[T]he wife-killing jokes of "'97 Bonnie and Clyde" aren't any funnier than Garth Brooks'." Entertainment Weekly gave a positive opinion: "In the album's funniest slice of black humor, a smart-ass parody of Will Smith's unctuous "Just the Two of Us" called "'97 Bonnie & Clyde," Eminem and his baby daughter take a pleasant drive to a lake — into which he tosses the dead body of the child's mother. Sending up the gooey sentiments and pop melody of the Smith hit, Eminem raps: "Mama said she wants to show you how far she can float/And don't worry about that little boo-boo on her throat."

== See also ==
- Bonnie and Clyde, 1967 film
- "'03 Bonnie & Clyde", 2002 song by Jay-Z featuring Beyoncé
