= Hello Miss Johnson =

2024 single by Jack Harlow

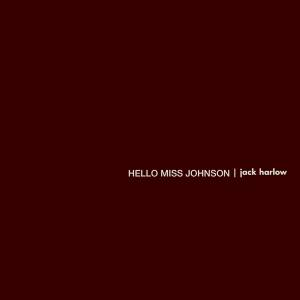

Single by Jack Harlow
- Released: November 21, 2024
- Genre: Hip hop
- Length: 2:44
- Label: Generation Now; Atlantic
- Songwriters: Jackman Harlow; Aksel Hauge; Clayborn Harlow; Donald Cannon; Douglas Ford; Jose Velazquez
- Producers: Aksel Arvid; Clay Harlow; Don Cannon; Angel López

Jack Harlow singles chronology
"Stop Giving Me Advice" (2023)	"Hello Miss Johnson" (2024)	"Tranquility" (2024)

Music video
- "Hello Miss Johnson" on YouTube

"Hello Miss Johnson" is a song by American rapper Jack Harlow, released on November 21, 2024. It was produced by Aksel Arvid, Clay Harlow, Don Cannon and Angel López.

== Composition and lyrics ==
Over a bossa nova-inspired instrumental with minimal percussion composed of snaps and muffled kick drums, Jack Harlow addresses his lover and her mother, delivering a message to the latter in the chorus: "Hello, Miss Johnson, you know why I'm callin' / You know I've been fallin', fallin' for your daughter / I think about her often, correct mе if I'm wrong, but / Was it you that gave the eyеs to her I be lost in? Thought so / Tell her I said hello if you can, and also / That I can't wait to see her again, and also / Tell her call me when she get a chance / 'Cause I got so much to say, and I appreciate you, ma'am".

== Music video ==
The music video was released alongside the single. Directed by the duo Shadrinsky and filmed via CCTV (i.e. security and doorbell cameras), it sees Jack Harlow in a cul-de-sac of a suburban neighborhood. He walks up to the front door of his love interest's house, before flirting with and courting her. Harlow makes romantic gestures, and tries to impress his lover and her mother by sending them an overload of gifts and performing a few repairs around the house as a handyman. Meanwhile, havoc is wreaking on the street behind them.

== Charts ==
=== Weekly charts ===
Weekly chart performance for "Hello Miss Johnson"
Chart (2024–2025)	Peak position
Canada Hot 100 (Billboard)	87
New Zealand Hot Singles (RMNZ)	11
Turkey International Airplay (Radiomonitor Türkiye)	4
US Billboard Hot 100	85
US Hot R&B/Hip-Hop Songs (Billboard)	26
US Pop Airplay (Billboard)	28
US Rhythmic Airplay (Billboard)	5

=== Year-end charts ===
Year-end chart performance for "Hello Miss Johnson"
Chart (2025)	Position
US Hot R&B/Hip-Hop Songs (Billboard)	86
US Rhythmic Airplay (Billboard)	37
