= Ridgio =

American rapper and record producer

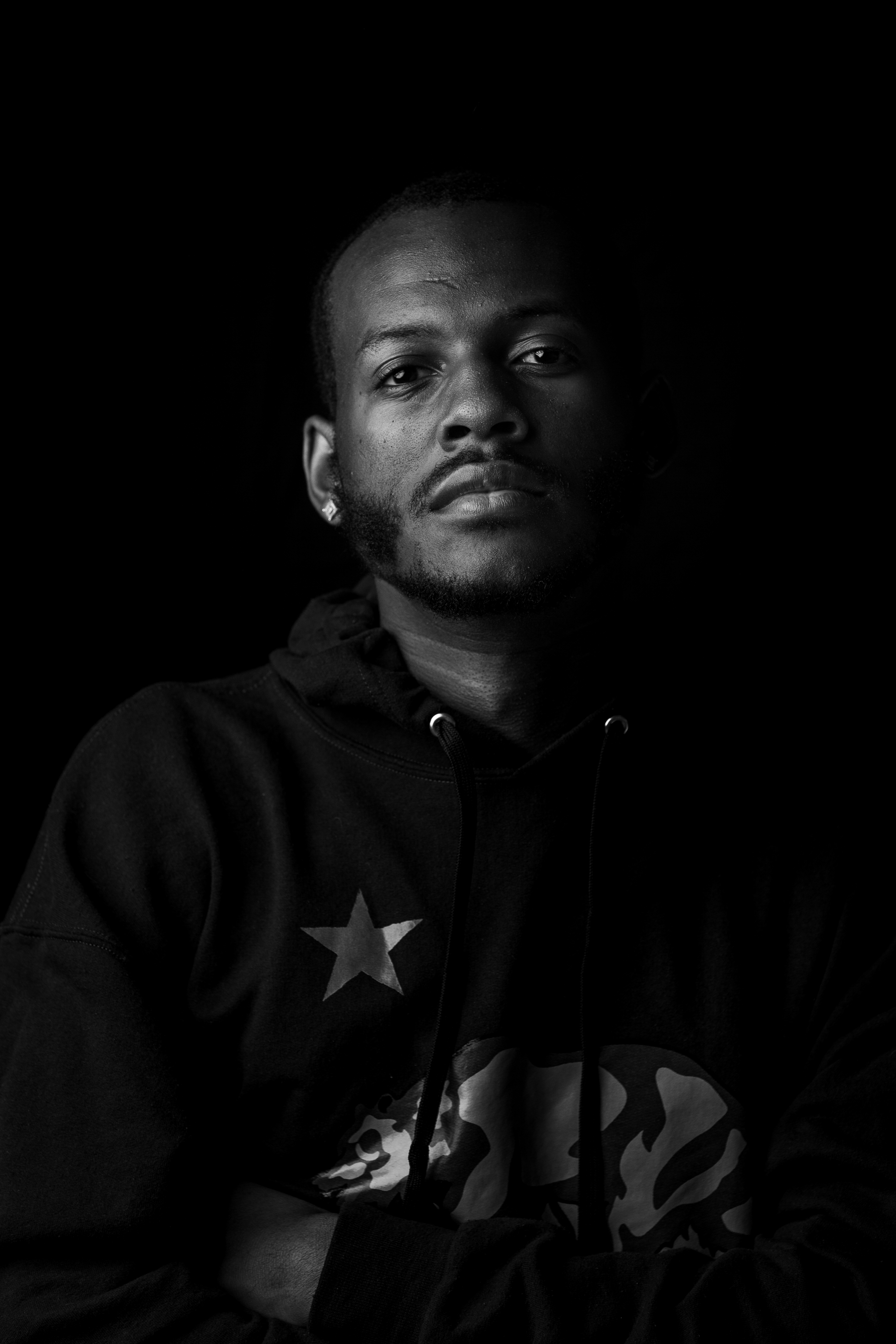

Background information
- Also known as: Ridge
- Born: Derek Ahmal Towner Jr. February 1, 1995 (age 31); West Suburban Hospital
- Origin: Chicago, Illinois
- Genre: Hip hop
- Occupations: Rapper; songwriter; record producer
- Instrument: Vocals
- Years active: 2013–Present
- Label: R.A.W. Entertainment
- Partner: Patrisia Vekima (2016–Present)
- Website: http://www.ridgio.com

Derek Ahmal Towner Jr. (born February 1, 1995), known professionally as Ridgio, is an American rapper and record producer from Chicago, Illinois. Ridgio is the founder of Chicago-based independent label R.A.W. Entertainment. To date, he has released 11 studio albums, 3 mixtapes and 3 EPs as a solo artist.

== Early life and education ==
Ridgio was born Derek Ahmal Towner Jr. on February 1, 1995, at West Suburban Hospital in Oak Park, Illinois. He was co-parented by his mother and father in the North Lawndale and Austin neighborhoods of Chicago. His grandfather was a part of the North Lawndale Community Church choir and his uncle was a part of rap group Cermak Boyz; these are his earliest musical influences. At the age of eight, he attended the House of Jacob Bible study class with his mother and stepfather. He stated, "my faith in God is my strength. I feel like it's the pillar of my artistry." His mother played Rakim, Lauryn Hill and The Sons of Jacob; he stated that Rakim is still one of his top artists today. In an interview, Ridgio stated that his earliest memory of making music was when he used to freestyle once a year on his father's birthday starting from the age of 12. Also at 12, he moved to Des Plaines, Illinois, with his mother and attended Chippewa Middle School and Maine West High School. At 17, Ridgio began making music with his cousins in his aunt's attic. Soon after, Ridgio was kicked out of his home in Des Plaines as a result of his drug use and getting arrested. After leaving his mother's house, Ridgio decided to move back to Chicago with his aunt.

== Musical career ==
=== 2013–2016 ===
Ridgio's earliest recordings were released on SoundCloud after he graduated from high school. Ridgio's debut collaborations, "Came Up" and "Lucky No More" with Big Boy Blue (formally known as Meeko Fly) received media attention from Elevator Mag in 2013. He recorded his first mixtape, C.L.O.U.D.S., at 18 and released singles "A Lot (Dope)" and "Ain't Ready" on SoundCloud. Despite gaining local recognition from those singles, he deleted them from all platforms. In 2015, Ridgio met his now wife, Patrisia Vekima, at an open mic at DePaul University, where they both performed. Within the same year, he also released his first two music videos, "Revolutionary" and "Anywhere", with Lyrical Lemonade's Cole Bennett. The songs were described as "a very fine mesh between a trap-like flow and a powerful meaning." Ridgio did not stray away from this style leading up to his debut EP release, Twenty I Winters. Since then, he has cultivated a series around the Winters projects that he releases annually on his birthday. He also released the mixtape A W A K E N on March 11, 2016. This was his first full-body project and included song production from Martin $ky and Kevin Frytz. A W A K E N helped Ridgio gain recognition in the Chicago Hip-Hop scene. Cole Bennett stated, "There's a solid chance you'll soon become a fan of Ridgio if you aren't already. This kid is quite unique. He is on a mission which is backed by solid reasoning that can be received through his music."

=== 2017–2018 ===
In 2017, Ridgio released his third and fourth projects, Twenty II Winters and World of Dreams. When describing the concept of World of Dreams, Ridgio stated, "Much of the project focuses on the theme of what it means to chase after your ambitions while also staying true to yourself." After releasing World of Dreams, Ridgio's music began to expand outside of the local hip hop scene. He was invited to the Boys & Girls Club in Michigan City, Indiana, and the LOK Wishing Tree Foundation to perform for his new audience. He also won a competition at The Promontory in Chicago to perform in Gary, Indiana, at Backstage on Broadway. Ridgio began producing instrumentals in 2017, which led to him receiving composition credits for web-series My Husband's Kid's in 2018.

Ridgio released Twenty III Winters in early 2018. This was his first self-produced album and included sound bites of his previously deleted C.L.O.U.D.S. mixtape from 2013. The project was described as "an exceptional follow up and displays the young rapper's growth as an artist." In the same year, Ridgio launched an in-city tour coined The Chicago Mix Tour. The tour was co-hosted by his artist friend Amoz Wright & Dj' d by Pivot Gang's Squeak. Later that summer, Ridgio was invited to perform at the Metro Chicago Music Hall. Shortly after the performance, he was discovered by Chicago native Captain Sky, which prompted a short-term collaboration. Sky co-wrote Ridgio's Enough Is Enough record, which was released the following year on his early 2019 effort, Twenty IV Winters.

=== 2019–2020 ===
On February 1, 2019, Ridgio released Twenty IV Winters. Being his second self-produced album, Austin based blog Sail Club Co. stated the project "truly shows his different sounds that he can produce". One of the project's singles, titled "Enough is Enough", was played on Chicago radio station Power 92.3 FM. That summer, he went on his first out-of-state tour, A LGIT Tour, with his close friends, Mudd, Parnell, Y.T.M. and Sean Chupich (Psa Productions). He also released his long-awaited C.L.O.U.D.S. album with all new records. He released music videos for 7 out of the 9 songs on the project. Ridgio gained significant recognition that summer when NPR Radio Station 91.1 FM included C.L.O.U.D.S.'s single "Inspiration" in its summer mid-day rotation.

On February 1, 2020, Ridgio released Twenty V Winters, which he introduced at a silent listening party in Chicago's Lincoln Park. NPR's Vocalo Radio placed Twenty V Winters' "Have You Ever" in its Poised to Breakthrough list. In this album, he displayed how he felt about the connections with the people who are closest to him, throughout his life. In an interview with Dark Matter Publications, Ridgio expressed, "I want them to listen to it beginning to end because it tells a story. I hope that people from song number one to song 25 would just listen to it, because it is cohesive. We're in an age right now where people just put a bunch of songs together and just label it an album and that's not what [my music] is." The COVID-19 pandemic followed right after the release of his album. He expressed that the pandemic hindered him with making music videos and promoting the album. Ridgio followed up mid 2020 with his album We Made It. It is what he calls an Interactive Project, where he had fans pick the producers, songs, and features on the album. In an interview about the project, Ridgio said, "It's called 'We Made It' because we made the project together. From start to finish, me and all of my supporters made the whole thing. From the concept, to production, to who's on it… It was also supposed to tie in quarantine, but we didn't really get out of quarantine fully, but maybe in the future it will!".

=== 2021–2023 ===
In early 2021, Ridgio released Twenty VI Winters. The album featured Chicago based rapper Mick Jenkins on the track "What's Mine". That spring he released follow-up EP Six More Days of Winter. Later that year, he went on to compose and executively produce the soundtrack to short-film Evil for Evil alongside Grammy Award winning cellist Malik Johnson. The film was a story about one young Black man’s reckoning with violence and trauma in the face of his burgeoning healing journey. The soundtrack was its own "existential experience" in representation of the album. Harvey World Editor-in-Chief Amethyst Davis noted, "Ridgio skillfully strikes a delicate balance between brazen and gentle. Evil is a disruption of disposability politics that challenges us all to reconsider binaries of 'good' and 'evil,' and consider a world where healing is a right rather than a privilege and redemption is possible for all."

On February 1st, 2022, Ridgio released animated album Twenty VII Winters. While premiering his "Animated Experience" at the House of Jacob's Chicago Annex, he proposed to his long-time girlfriend Patrisia Vekima. He followed the album with a consistent release of singles every other week leading up to stand-out record Out of Body Experience. In July 2022, radio station WPWX 92.3 FM named Ridgio and his single "Out of Body Experience" the Power Pick of the Week. IHeartRadio Dj Jamal Smallz discovered the track shortly after and included it in the weekly rotation on 107.5 WGCI.

Additionally, after a 9-year delay, Ridgio released the original recordings of his freshman mixtape C.L.O.U.D.S on June 20, 2022 on all major platforms; he titled the project C.L.O.U.D.S. (2014). Also that summer, Ridgio released his first compilation album, And Friends, which featured Mick Jenkins, Mark Battles, and frequent collaborator Parnell. In early 2023, Ridgio released his 11th studio album, Twenty VIII Winters. Ridgio was nominated for best individual hip hop act for the year 2022 by the Chicago Reader Magazine.

== Discography ==
=== Studio albums ===
List of studio albums (soundtrack & compilation albums included) with selected details
Title	Album details
World of Dreams	Released: August 17, 2017; Label: Self Released; Format: Digital Download, CD
Twenty III Winters	Released: February 1, 2018; Label: Self Released; Format: Digital Download, CD
Twenty IV Winters	Released: February 1, 2019; Label: Self Released; Format: Digital Download
C.L.O.U.D.S.	Released: July 7, 2019; Label: Self Released; Format: Digital Download
Twenty V Winters	Released: February 1, 2020; Label: Self Released; Format: Digital Download, CD
We Made it	Released: July 16, 2020; Label: Self Released; Format: Digital Download
Twenty VI Winters	Released: February 1, 2020; Label: Self Released; Format: Digital Download, CD
Evil for Evil The Inspired Album	Released: November 12, 2021; Label: Self Released; Format: Digital Download
Twenty VII Winters	Released: February 1, 2022; Label: Self Released; Format: Digital Download, CD
And Friends	Released: July 29, 2022; Label: Self Released; Format: Digital Download
Twenty VIII Winters	Released: February 1, 2023; Label: R.A.W. Entertainment; Format: Digital Download
Twenty IX Winters	● Released: February 29th, 2024 ● Label: R.A.W. Entertainment ● Format: Digital

=== Extended plays ===
List of extended plays with selected details
Title	Album details
Twenty I Winters	Released: February 1, 2016; Label: Self Released; Format: Digital Download
Twenty II Winters	Released: February 1, 2017; Label: Self Released; Format: Digital Download, CD
Six More Days of Winter	Released: March 19, 2021; Label: Self Released; Format: Digital Download

=== Mixtapes ===
Title	Album details
A W A K E N	Released: March 11, 2016; Label: Self Released; Format: Digital Download
C.L.O.U.D.S. (2014)	Released: June 20, 2022; Label: R.A.W. Entertainment; Format: Digital Download
JACKBALLMUSIC	● Released: July 28, 2023 ● Label: R.A.W. Entertainment ● Format: Digital

== Tours ==
- The Chicago Mix Tour (2018)
- A L'GIT Tour (2019)
- The Twenty VIII Summers Tour (2023)
- DND Tour [Opening for Mark Battles] (2024)
