= Kim (song) =

2000 song by Eminem

Song by Eminem

from the album The Marshall Mathers LP
- Released: May 23, 2000
- Recorded: 1998
- Genre: Horrorcore
- Length: 6:17
- Label: Aftermath; Interscope; Web
- Songwriters: Marshall Mathers; Jeff Bass; Mark Bass
- Producer: F.B.T.

Audio sample
- file; help

"Kim" is a song by American rapper Eminem that appears on his 2000 album The Marshall Mathers LP. The song in the tradition of a murder ballad reflects intense anger and hatred toward his then-wife Kim Mathers, and features Eminem imitating her voice, ending with him murdering her and later putting her body in the trunk of his car.

== Song ==
"Kim" was the first song Eminem recorded for the album, shortly after finishing work on The Slim Shady LP in late 1998. He wrote it, along with "'97 Bonnie & Clyde" (where Eminem and his daughter go to the lake to dispose of Kim's dead body), when he and Kim were having relationship problems and Kim was preventing him from seeing his daughter Hailie. Despite its controversial graphic content, it is often highlighted as one of Eminem's most memorable songs.

"Kim" is the third song of Eminem about Kim, the first of which is "Searchin'" from his debut album Infinite, and the second "'97 Bonnie & Clyde" from the albums Slim Shady EP and The Slim Shady LP.

On the clean version of The Marshall Mathers LP, this song is replaced by a clean version of "The Kids" (an unedited version can be found on the CD single of "The Way I Am" along with the UK and deluxe editions of The Marshall Mathers LP).

== Critical reception ==
The song received mixed reviews. The Rolling Stone album review of The Marshall Mathers LP stated that:

Things degenerate from there into the mountain of bile reserved for Kim, the mother of his baby and the star of the world's most public ongoing murder fantasy [...] 'Kim' has Eminem screaming at his ex in an insane stream-of-consciousness hate spew. There's little humor to blunt the shock of the hellbent animosity of 'Kim.' What makes it powerful is that, of course, he doesn't just hate her. It's the most harrowing sick-love song since Guns N' Roses' 'Used to Love Her.'

While Entertainment Weekly wrote that:

'Kim', a prequel to '97 Bonnie and Clyde' is a shout-rapped enactment of domestic violence so real it chills... 'Stan' and 'Kim' blaze significant new ground for rap.

In 2001, Robert Christgau told Rolling Stone that songs like "Kim" and Ghostface Killah's "Wildflower" employ sexist content in an artful way that offers insight into its pathology, citing them as exceptions to the usual "reflexive and violent sexism" popularized by rap and heavy metal: "[T]he nonsense that 'Kim' advocates the murder of wives who cheat – what an absurdity, and what a disgusting absurdity on the part of people who don't give Eminem credit for being more intelligent than they are, quite frankly."

In 2013, Complex ranked "Kim" at #21 on their list of the 25 most violent rap songs of all time and at #6 on their list of the 50 most depressing rap songs.

== Credits and personnel ==
The credits for "Kim" are adapted from the liner notes of The Marshall Mathers LP.

Personnel

- Eminem – songwriting, vocals
- Bass Brothers – production, songwriting
- Dr. Dre – mixing
- Richard Huredia – recording and mix engineering
- Brian Gardner – mastering
