= Brain Damage (Eminem song) =

1999 song by Eminem

Song by Eminem

from the album The Slim Shady LP
- Released: February 23, 1999
- Recorded: 1998
- Genre: Hardcore hip hop
- Length: 3:46
- Label: Aftermath; Interscope
- Songwriters: Marshall Mathers; Jeff Bass; Mark Bass
- Producers: Bass Brothers; Eminem

"Brain Damage" is a song by American rapper Eminem from his second studio album The Slim Shady LP (1999). It is about his experience with bullying as a child.

== Background ==
The song finds Eminem rapping in comic exaggeration about his childhood experience of being bullied by a boy named DeAngelo Bailey, particularly recounting an incident of being severely beaten by him. In the narrative, Bailey attacks Eminem in the school bathroom, breaking his nose on the urinal, soaking his clothes in blood, and choking him with even the principal coming in and helping the bully. Afterward, Eminem beats Bailey with a broomstick in revenge, standing over him with his foot on his chest. Later at home, Eminem suddenly loses his sight as his left ear begins to bleed. His mother sees him, assumes he is on drugs, and in anger further injures him by beating him in the head with a remote control until his brain falls out. The song concludes with Eminem repairing and sewing shut his head.

In April 1999, Eminem stated in an interview with Rolling Stone, "Motherfucker used to beat the shit out of me. I was in fourth grade and he was in sixth. Everything in the song is true: One day he came in the bathroom, I was pissing, and he beat the shit out of me. Pissed all over myself. But that's not how I got really fucked up." He additionally said in an interview with The Washington Post in July 1999, "All of it is true except for when I say in eighth grade. It twas really back in grade school. I think I was in the fourth grade and he was in the sixth grade. I changed little things up just to make the story a little bit more interesting. The whole story is true up until my brain falls out of my head." In the same year, DeAngelo Bailey admitted to bullying Eminem in a Rolling Stone interview: "He was the one we used to pick on. There was a bunch of us that used to mess with him. You know, bully-type things. We was having fun. Sometimes he'd fight back — depended on what mood he'd be in."

While students at Dort Elementary School, Bailey allegedly subjected Eminem to a series of assaults over a period of four months, culminating in an incident in January 1982 in which Bailey threw a snowball at Eminem and hit him into a snowbank, causing Eminem to black out and be hospitalized for traumatic brain injury. Eminem's mother Debbie Mathers later reported, "He had a cerebral hemorrhage and was in and out of consciousness for five days. The doctors had given up on him, but I wouldn't give up on my son." She sued Roseville Community Schools for this in 1982, stating her son suffered a cerebral concussion, post-traumatic headaches, post-concussion syndrome, intermittent loss of vision and hearing, nausea and antisocial behavior as a result. The suit was dismissed in 1983; a Macomb County, Michigan judge said the schools were immune from lawsuits. As for the assault, Bailey boasted to Rolling Stone, "Yeah, we flipped him right on his head at recess. When we didn't see him moving, we took off running. We lied and said he slipped on the ice. He was a wild kid, but back then we thought it was stupid. Hey, you have his phone number?"

== Lawsuit ==
In August 2001, DeAngelo Bailey filed a $1 million lawsuit against Eminem for slander and invasion of privacy, claiming he only "bumped" him and gave him a "little shove". In 2003, the lawsuit was dismissed by judge Deborah Servitto, who wrote her ruling in the form of rap-like rhyme: "Mr. Bailey complains that his rap is trash / So he's seeking compensation in the form of cash / Bailey thinks he's entitled to some monetary gain / Because Eminem used his name in vain / The lyrics are stories no one would take as fact / They're an exaggeration of a childish act / It is therefore this court's ultimate position / That Eminem is entitled to summary disposition." The verdict was upheld in 2005, and Bailey's lawyer ruled out any further appeals.
