= Stop Giving Me Advice =

2023 single by Lyrical Lemonade and Dave featuring Jack Harlow

Single by Lyrical Lemonade, Jack Harlow, and Dave

from the album All Is Yellow
- Released: December 8, 2023
- Genre: Hip hop
- Length: 4:02
- Label: Lyrical Lemonade; Def Jam; Universal
- Songwriters: David Omoregie; Jackman Harlow; Matthew Tavares; Kameron Cole; Josè Velàzquez; Tobias Breuer; Davud Ahmedzade
- Producers: Tavares; Hollywood Cole; Angel Lopez; Rascal; Daz

Lyrical Lemonade singles chronology
"Hello There" (2023)	"Stop Giving Me Advice" (2023)	"Fallout" (2024)

Dave singles chronology
"Meridian" / "Special" (2023)	"Stop Giving Me Advice" (2023)	"Raindance" (2025)

Jack Harlow singles chronology
"Lovin on Me" (2023)	"Stop Giving Me Advice" (2023)	"Hello Miss Johnson" (2024)

Music video
- "Stop Giving Me Advice" on YouTube

"Stop Giving Me Advice" is a song released by American music video company Lyrical Lemonade, performed by American rapper Jack Harlow and British rapper Dave. It was released through Lyrical Lemonade and Def Jam Recordings as a single on December 8, 2023. The song was written alongside producers Matthew Tavares, Hollywood Cole, Angel Lopez, Rascal, and Daz. It is the fourth single from Lyrical Lemonade's debut album, All Is Yellow (2024). The official music video for the song was directed by Cole Bennett of Lyrical Lemonade and released on the same day. It was shot in Dave's hometown of London, with Bennett and Harlow traveling to visit him there.

== Composition and lyrics ==
"Stop Giving Me Advice" was described by critics as "a dose of trans-Atlantic fire" and a "stunning collaboration". Lyrically, Harlow’s rap "reflects on a rapid rise to stardom" due to him "having been through the motions of a hip-hop artist and pop star" and how he "is still reckoning with the price of fame" while Dave "reflects on his past relationships, and how his lifestyle has affected those".

Writing for Vibe, Regina Cho notes that Harlow "sets the tone with his bars about not wanting guidance from peers who aren’t on his level" while later in the track, "Dave finds his pocket and delivers impressive bars over the somber, guitar-led instrumental".

== Critical reception ==
Clash's Robin Murray stated that "the two have delivered a dose of trans-Atlantic fire, one that blends their talents while allowing their differences to resonate" and that the track "comes straight from the chest, the powerful interplay making for a knock-out moment". He continued to note that despite the "incessant" guitar line, Harlow dips "into his more introspective side" on the song.

== Music video ==
The song's official Cole Bennett-directed music video was shot in London and is described as "stylish" by critics. The video sees both artists performing the song around London and in the iconic British Taxis while including features from landmarks such as The Gherkin. Both Harlow and Dave wear black suits with yellow ties in the black and white music video in order for the yellow to stand out for the All Is Yellow album.

== Charts ==
Chart performance for "Stop Giving Me Advice"
Chart (2023)	Peak position
Ireland (IRMA)	33
New Zealand Hot Singles (RMNZ)	7
UK Singles (OCC)	29
UK Hip Hop/R&B (OCC)	4
