= Otherwize =

American rapper

- Born: Alex Harris; Los Angeles, California, U.S.
- Genre: Hip hop
- Occupation: Rapper
- Years active: 1996–present (solo)
- Label: 7th Avenue Music Group

Otherwize (born Alex Harris in Los Angeles) is an American rapper and freestyle battle MC. He became associated with the Los Angeles underground hip-hop scene through the Good Life Café and Project Blowed. He won the final battle against Eminem at the 1997 Rap Olympics, a competition held in Los Angeles.

== Biography ==
Otherwize developed an interest in music during childhood and participated in gospel choir recordings. According to published biographical accounts, he later became involved in Los Angeles's underground hip-hop scene, performing at the Good Life Café, an open-mic venue associated with the development of several alternative hip-hop artists. He subsequently became associated with Project Blowed, a hip-hop collective and open-mic community that emerged from the "Good Life" scene. He also performed at "Elements", a Los Angeles venue known for its freestyle battles and underground hip-hop performances.

He gained recognition in the underground hip-hop scene for his freestyle performances and participation in rap battles. In 1997, he competed against Eminem in the final of the Rap Olympics in Los Angeles and won the competition. The result has been discussed in retrospective accounts of Eminem's early career. The event took place before Eminem achieved mainstream success. After the competition, an Interscope Records employee became interested in Eminem's music, helping bring his recordings to the attention of producer Dr. Dre. Otherwize's victory has subsequently been referenced in coverage of the competition and the history of battle rap. In 1999, Otherwize battled in Scribble Jam held in Cincinnati, he defeated Spon, Sole of Anticon and Crescent Moon before losing to Eyedea in the semi-finals. Otherwize continued performing and recording music within the independent hip-hop scene. He has released solo material and collaborated with other underground hip-hop artists. His releases include C.U.N.Traffic. He has also been associated with groups and collaborative projects including Foot Soljaaz and Black Forest. His discography includes albums, EPs, singles and guest appearances on recordings by other artists.

== Discography ==
=== Studio albums ===
- C.U.N.Traffic (2003)
- Alex (2016)
- Run Blackman Run (2017)
- One Day Theory (2018)
- Next Day Theory (2018)

=== Extended Plays (EPs) ===
- Disturbing the Peace (2001)
- After the Plane Crash (2001)
- Burnt Out Buziness (2003)

== Filmography ==
- Freestyle: The Art of Rhyme (2000)
- Where We're From: Rise of LA Underground Hip Hop (2021)
