= The Marshall Mathers LP =

- Main artwork

Studio album by Eminem
- Released: May 23, 2000
- Recorded: September 1998 ("Kim"); July 1999–March 2000
- Studios: The Mix Room (Burbank, California); Encore (Burbank, California); Larrabee Sound (Hollywood); Chung King (New York); Record Plant (Los Angeles); 54 Sound (Detroit)
- Genres: Midwestern hip-hop; horrorcore; hardcore hip-hop
- Length: 72:17
- Labels: Goliath; Aftermath; WEB; Interscope
- Producers: Eminem; Dr. Dre; F.B.T.; Mel-Man; The 45 King

Eminem chronology
The Slim Shady LP (1999)	The Marshall Mathers LP (2000)	The Eminem Show (2002)

Singles from The Marshall Mathers LP
- 1. "The Real Slim Shady" Released: April 18, 2000; 2. "The Way I Am" Released: October 3, 2000; 3. "Stan" Released: November 20, 2000; 4. "I'm Back" Released: April, 2001; 5. "Kill You" Released: April, 2001; 6. "Bitch Please II" Released: May 23, 2001

The Marshall Mathers LP (also referred to as the MMLP) is the third studio album by the American rapper Eminem, released on May 23, 2000, by Goliath Artists, Aftermath Entertainment, WEB Entertainment, and Interscope Records. Production on the album was handled by Dr. Dre, Mel-Man, F.B.T., Eminem, and the 45 King. The album features guest appearances from Dido, RBX, Sticky Fingaz, Dina Rae, Bizarre, Dr. Dre, Snoop Dogg, Xzibit, Nate Dogg, Paul Rosenberg and D12. Recorded over a 10-month period in several studios around Detroit, the album delivers introspective lyricism reflecting Eminem's thoughts on his rise to fame, criticism of his music, and estrangement from his family. As a transgressive work, it incorporates hardcore hip-hop, satirical hip-hop, and horrorcore.

The Marshall Mathers LP produced the singles "The Real Slim Shady", "The Way I Am", and "Stan", with "The Real Slim Shady" becoming Eminem's biggest hit up to that point. Like its predecessor, the album was surrounded by significant controversy upon release, while also propelling Eminem to the forefront of American pop culture. Criticism centered on lyrics that were considered violent, homophobic, and misogynistic, as well as references to the Columbine High School massacre in the songs "The Way I Am" and "I'm Back". Future second lady Lynne Cheney criticized the lyrics at a United States Senate hearing, as misogynistic and violent against women, while the Canadian government considered refusing Eminem's entry into the country.

Despite the controversies, The Marshall Mathers LP received positive reviews upon release; in the years since, it has received even greater critical acclaim. Rolling Stone, among other publications, named it the best album of 2000. Critics praised Eminem's lyrical ability and the album's emotional complexity. The album debuted at number 1 on the Billboard 200, staying atop for eight consecutive weeks. A significant commercial success compared to the release of The Slim Shady LP just the previous year, the album sold 1.76 million copies in its first week, which was the second-most first week sales in the United States at the time.

Widely regarded as Eminem's best album, The Marshall Mathers LP was included in Rolling Stone's list of the 500 Greatest Albums of All Time just three years after its release. It has sold 25 million copies worldwide, making it one of the best-selling albums of all time, and is certified 12× platinum by the Recording Industry Association of America (RIAA). It was nominated for Album of the Year and won Best Rap Album at the 2001 Grammy Awards, while "The Real Slim Shady" won Best Rap Solo Performance. The Marshall Mathers LP 2, the album's sequel, was released in 2013. The album's legacy is further marked by "Stan", which details around a crazed fan of the same name and gave rise to the Oxford English Dictionary term stan.

== Background ==
Inspired by the disappointment and failure of his debut album, Infinite (1996), Eminem created the alter ego Slim Shady, whom he introduced on the Slim Shady EP (1997). After placing second in the annual Rap Olympics, Eminem was noticed by the staff at Interscope Records and eventually CEO Jimmy Iovine, who played the Slim Shady EP for hip-hop producer Dr. Dre. Eminem and Dr. Dre then met and recorded The Slim Shady LP (1999), which was noted for its over-the-top lyrical depictions of drugs and violence. The Slim Shady LP was a critical and commercial success, debuting at number 2 on the Billboard 200 chart and selling 283,000 copies in its first week. At the 42nd Grammy Awards in 2000, the record won Best Rap Album, while the album's lead single "My Name Is" won Best Rap Solo Performance.

The Slim Shady LP turned Eminem from an underground rapper into a high-profile celebrity. The rapper, who had previously struggled to provide for his daughter Hailie, noted a drastic change in his lifestyle. In June 1999, he married his girlfriend Kimberly Ann "Kim" Scott, the mother of Hailie, despite the fact that the song "'97 Bonnie & Clyde" from The Slim Shady LP contains references to killing her. The rapper became uncomfortable with the level of fame he had achieved, and said, "I don't trust nobody now because everybody I meet is meeting me as Eminem...I don't know if they are hanging with me 'cause they like me or because I'm a celebrity or because they think they can get something from me." Eminem also became a highly controversial figure due to his lyrical content. He was labeled as "misogynist, a nihilist and an advocate of domestic violence", and in an editorial, Billboard editor in chief Timothy White accused Eminem of "making money by exploiting the world's misery".

Eminem considered naming his third album Amsterdam after a trip to the city shortly after the release of The Slim Shady LP, in which he and his friends engaged in heavy drug use. The "free" use of drugs Eminem observed during his time in Amsterdam greatly influenced his desire to openly discuss drug use in his music and inspired some of the content on the album.

== Recording ==
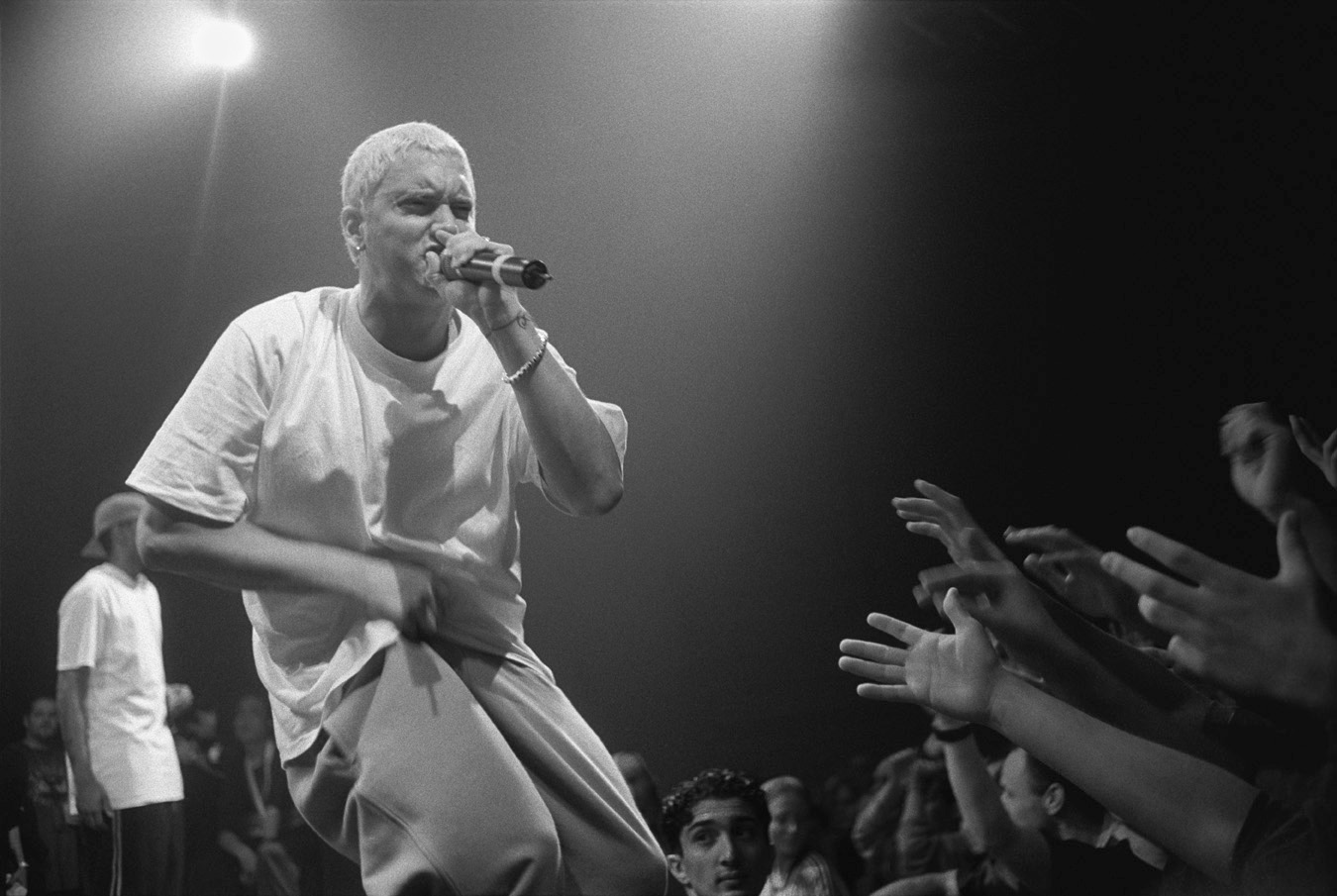
Eminem (pictured in 1999) wrote the majority of The Marshall Mathers LP while in the studio.

The Marshall Mathers LP was recorded in a two-month-long "creative binge", which often involved 20-hour-long studio sessions. Eminem hoped to keep publicity down during the recording in order to stay focused on working and figuring out how to "map out" each song. He described himself as a "studio rat" who benefited creatively from the isolated environment of the studio. Much of the album was written spontaneously in the studio; Dr. Dre noted, "We don't wake up at two in the morning, call each other, and say, 'I have an idea. We gotta get to the studio.' We just wait and see what happens when we get there." Eminem observed that much of his favorite material on the album evolved from "fucking around" in the studio; "Marshall Mathers" developed from the rapper watching Jeff Bass casually strumming a guitar, while "Criminal" was based on a piano riff Eminem overheard Bass playing in studio next door. "Kill You" was written when Eminem heard the track playing in the background while talking to Dr. Dre on the phone and developed an interest in using it for a song. He then wrote the lyrics at home and met up with Dr. Dre and the two recorded the song together.

"Kim" was the first song the rapper recorded for the album, shortly after finishing work on The Slim Shady LP. Eminem wrote "Kim" at a time in which he and his wife were separated, and he had just watched a romantic movie alone at a theater. Originally intending to write a love song for her while using ecstasy, the rapper hoped to avoid overt sentimentality and thus began writing a song of hate. With the track, the rapper aimed to create a short horror story in the form of a song. Once the couple reconciled, Eminem recalls, "I asked her to tell me what she thought of it. I remember my dumb ass saying, 'I know this is a fucked-up song, but it shows how much I care about you. To even think about you this much. To even put you on a song like this'." The song "Stan" was produced by The 45 King. Eminem's manager, Paul Rosenberg, sent Eminem a tape of the producer's beats, and the second track featured a sample of English singer-songwriter Dido's "Thank You". Upon hearing the song's lyrics, Eminem felt they described an obsessed fan, which became the inspiration for the song. The writing process for "Stan" differed greatly from Eminem's usual strategy, in which song concepts form during the writing: "'Stan' was one of the few songs that I actually sat down and had everything mapped out for. I knew what it was going to be about." Dido later heard "Stan" and enjoyed it, and observed, "I got this letter out of the blue one day. It said, 'We like your album, we've used this track. Hope you don't mind, and hope you like it.' When they sent ['Stan'] to me and I played it in my hotel room, I was like, 'Wow! This track's amazing.'"

Some label executives speculated that Eminem would be the first artist to sell one million copies in an album's first week of release. These expectations placed a large burden on Eminem, who recalled, "I was scared to death. I wanted to be successful, but before anything, I want respect." After the album was finished, executives felt that there were no songs that had potential to be a lead single. Feeling pressured, Eminem returned to the studio and wrote "The Way I Am" as his way of saying, "Look, this is the best I can do. I can't give you another 'My Name Is.' I can't just sit in there and make that magic happen." However, after the song was added to the album, Eminem felt the urge to write another song, and gave a hook to Dr. Dre for him to create a beat, and went home to write new lyrics; the song eventually became "The Real Slim Shady". The song also discusses Eminem killing Dr. Dre. The producer stated, "It was funny to me. As long as it's hot, let's roll with it ... in my opinion, the crazier it is the better. Let's have fun with it and excite people."

== Music and lyrics ==
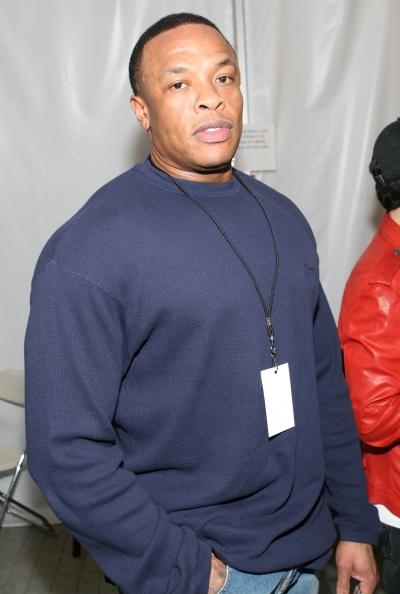
Dr. Dre produced most of the first half of the album, together with Mel-Man.

Considered both a horrorcore and a hardcore hip-hop album, much of the album's first half was produced by Dr. Dre and Mel-Man, who employed their typical sparse, stripped-down beats, to put more focus on Eminem's vocals. The background music on the record employs "liquid basslines, stuttering rhythms, slight sound effects, and spacious soundscapes". Bass Brothers and Eminem produced most of the second half, which ranges from the laid-back guitars of "Marshall Mathers" to the atmosphere of "Amityville". The only outside producer on the album was The 45 King, who sampled a verse from Dido's song "Thank You" for "Stan", while adding a slow bass line.

The Marshall Mathers LP is considered a transgressive work, and contains more autobiographical themes in comparison to The Slim Shady LP. Much of the album is spent addressing his rise to fame and attacking those who criticized his previous album. Other themes include his relationship with his family, including his mother and Kim Mathers, his ex-wife. Unlike Eminem's major-label debut, The Slim Shady LP, The Marshall Mathers LP is more introspective in its lyrics and uses less of the Slim Shady persona, with it used in only two songs [The Real Slim Shady and I'm Back]with music critic Stephen Thomas Erlewine writing that the album's lyrics "[blur] the distinction between reality and fiction, humor and horror, satire and documentary". The record showcases a variety of moods, ranging from irreverent and humorous to "dark and unsettling enough to make you want to enlarge the parental warning stickers on the album." According to Neil Strauss of The New York Times, "Eminem never makes it clear which character—Slim Shady or Marshall Mathers—is the mask and which is the real person, because there is no clear-cut answer, except that there's a little bit of each character in all of us."

Most songs cover Eminem's childhood struggles and family issues, involving his mother ("Kill You"), the relationship struggles with his wife ("Kim"), his struggles with his superstardom and expectations ("Stan", "I'm Back", and "Marshall Mathers"), his return and effect on the music industry ("Remember Me?", "Bitch Please II"), his drug use ("Drug Ballad", "The Kids"), his effect on the American youth and society ("The Way I Am", "Who Knew"), and reactionary barbs to critical response of his vulgarity and dark themes ("Criminal"). Despite the large amount of controversy regarding the lyrics, the lyrics on the album were overwhelmingly well received among critics and the hip-hop community, many praising Eminem's verbal energy and dense rhyme patterns.

The record also contains lyrics that have been considered to be homophobic. The song "Criminal" features the line "My words are like a dagger with a jagged edge/That'll stab you in the head whether you're a fag or les or a homosex, hermaph, or a transavest, pants or dress, Hate fags?/The answer's yes". The Gay & Lesbian Alliance Against Defamation (GLAAD) condemned his lyrics and criticized the album for "encourag[ing] violence against gay men and lesbians". However, writing for the LGBT interest magazine The Advocate, editor Dave White writes, "If he has gay-bashed you or me, then it logically follows that he has also raped his own mother, killed his wife, and murdered his producer, Dr. Dre. If he's to be taken literally, then so is Britney Spears' invitation to 'hit me baby, one more time'." Eminem noted that he began using the word "faggot" more frequently when "people got all up in arms about it...to piss them off worse", but added, "I think it's hard for some people to understand that for me the word 'faggot' has nothing to do with sexual preference. I meant something more like assholes or dickheads." Evangelical Christian religious figure James Dobson also heavily criticized Eminem.

== Songs ==
"Kill You"
The second track on the album, "Kill You" exemplifies the album's over-the-top descriptions of violence, confrontational vocal delivery, and criticism of the media, record label expectations, and Eminem's mother.

"Stan"
The album's third single has been referred to as the album's centerpiece and includes a sample of Dido's "Thank You". During the verses, Eminem portrays both himself and an obsessive fan who kills himself and his pregnant girlfriend, with pen-scratching sounds in the background to indicate communication via letters.

The first track, "Kill You", discusses the controversy that surrounded the rapper's first album, nightmares of "ladies' screams", and being raised by a single mother. In the song, Eminem also talks of raping his mother, and "notes the irony of magazines trumpeting his mother-raping self on their covers'." The six-and-a-half minute long "Stan" samples Dido's "Thank You" and tells the story of an exchange between the rapper and an extremely obsessive fan, where the titular character berates Eminem for not responding to his letters, which later turns to the fan committing suicide with his pregnant girlfriend. On "Who Knew", the rapper addresses criticism regarding glorification of violence in his lyrics, pointing out perceived hypocrisy in American society. According to Gabriel Alvarez of Complex, Eminem's response ranges oscillates from "smart-ass ('Oh, you want me to watch my mouth, how?/Take my fuckin' eyeballs out and turn 'em around?') to smart ('Ain't they got the same moms and dads who got mad when I asked if they liked violence?/And told me that my tape taught 'em to swear/What about the makeup you allow your 12-year-old daughter to wear?')." "Who Knew" is followed by the "Steve Berman" skit. "What's the Difference" plays in the background while the president of sales at Interscope Records angrily confronts the rapper about his lyrical content. He notes that Dr. Dre was successful because he rapped about "big-screen TVs, blunts, 40's, and bitches", while Eminem raps about "homosexuals and Vicodin", and believes that the album will be a commercial and critical disaster.

"The Way I Am" is a meditation on the pressure to maintain his fame, and his fear of being "pigeon-holed into some poppy sensation/to cop me rotation at rock 'n' roll stations". He also laments the negative media attention received by controversial public figures such as himself and Marilyn Manson in the wake of shootings, including the Columbine High School massacre and the 1998 Westside Middle School shooting. The rapper criticizes the media for focusing on tragedies such as school shootings while ignoring inner-city violence that occurs on a daily basis. "The Real Slim Shady" pokes fun at pop culture icons such as Britney Spears, Christina Aguilera and Will Smith. "Remember Me?" follows with rappers RBX and Sticky Fingaz, who "kick seriously Stygian darkness on the ominous track". In the song, he states "I'm tryna clean up my fuckin' image / So I promised the fuckin' critics / I wouldn't say 'fuckin' for six minutes/(Six minutes, Slim Shady, you're on)". Despite saying the word "fuck" one more time in "Remember Me", and three times at the beginning of "I'm Back", he does not say the word "fuckin" for seven minutes and 29 seconds after delivering the original promise, saying it again in the song "Marshall Mathers".

"Marshall Mathers"
This song, with its sparse, minimalist production featuring an acoustic guitar, is a diss track aimed at pop artists such as NSYNC, Ricky Martin, and Britney Spears. It also expresses frustration at people who have tried to use Eminem for his fame.

"Kim"
The album's most controversial track, "Kim" is a chaotic murder fantasy where Eminem plays both himself and the voice of his wife Kim. The production samples "When the Levee Breaks" by Led Zeppelin.

"I'm Back" features Eminem's observations regarding his rise to fame, explaining that he "became a commodity/'Cause I'm W-H-I-T-E". The next song, "Marshall Mathers", mocks the chorus of LFO's "Summer Girls", while criticizing the lack of artistic merit of pop stars such as Britney Spears, the Backstreet Boys, NSYNC, and Ricky Martin. The song also takes aim at rap duo Insane Clown Posse, where Eminem raps about Violent J and Shaggy 2 Dope being flaming homosexuals. "Drug Ballad" has vocals from Dina Rae, and describes the rapper's struggles with his drug addiction. He writes about some of his experiences under the influence of ecstasy which makes him "sentimental as fuck, spilling guts to you/we just met, but I think I'm in love with you" and features a party-esque feel. "Amityville" is a bass-heavy ode to living in Detroit, where the rapper discusses the city's crowning as murder capital of the United States. "Bitch Please II" showcases Dr. Dre, Snoop Dogg and Xzibit, and contains elements of g-funk, as well as R&B crooning from Nate Dogg on the chorus.

"Kim", the prequel to "97 Bonnie and Clyde" from The Slim Shady LP, features Eminem "screaming at his ex in an insane stream-of-consciousness hate spew". The song begins with Eminem talking softly to his daughter, but as the beat starts, the rapper takes on portraying two characters, utilizing his own enraged, threatening voice, seemingly from realizing Kim has cheated on him with another man, and the terrified shrieks of his wife Kim. As the song ends, Eminem kills her while taunting, "Bleed, bitch, bleed!" "Kim" is followed by "Under the Influence", which sees Eminem speaking in gibberish for the chorus, and later rap group D12 "runs rampant" on the track. "Criminal" features production from F.B.T., which consists of "piano licks, swerving synth, and a deceptively simplistic bass rumble over which Em snakes and snarls and warns that 'you can't stop me from topping these charts...'". He pokes fun at critics who take his lyrical content seriously, explaining that "half the shit I say, I just make it up to make you mad".

== Release ==
The Marshall Mathers LP was released on May 23, 2000, by Aftermath Entertainment, Interscope Records, in the United States, and on September 11, 2000, by Polydor Records in the United Kingdom. The Marshall Mathers LP was released with two different album covers. The original features Eminem sitting on the porch of the house he lived in during his teenage years. He reflected on the photo shoot by saying, "I had mixed feelings because I had a lot of good and bad memories in that house. But to go back to where I grew up and finally say, 'I've made it', is the greatest feeling in the world to me." The other cover features the rapper seated in a fetal position beneath a loading dock with alcohol and prescription pill bottles at his feet. Will Hermes of Entertainment Weekly likened Eminem's appearance on the cover to a "dysfunctional Little Rascal", viewing the image as indicative of the rapper's musical evolution: "Easy to read, right? The debut: a violent fantasy, the acting-out of a persona. The follow-up: the vulnerable artist unmasked."

=== Censorship ===
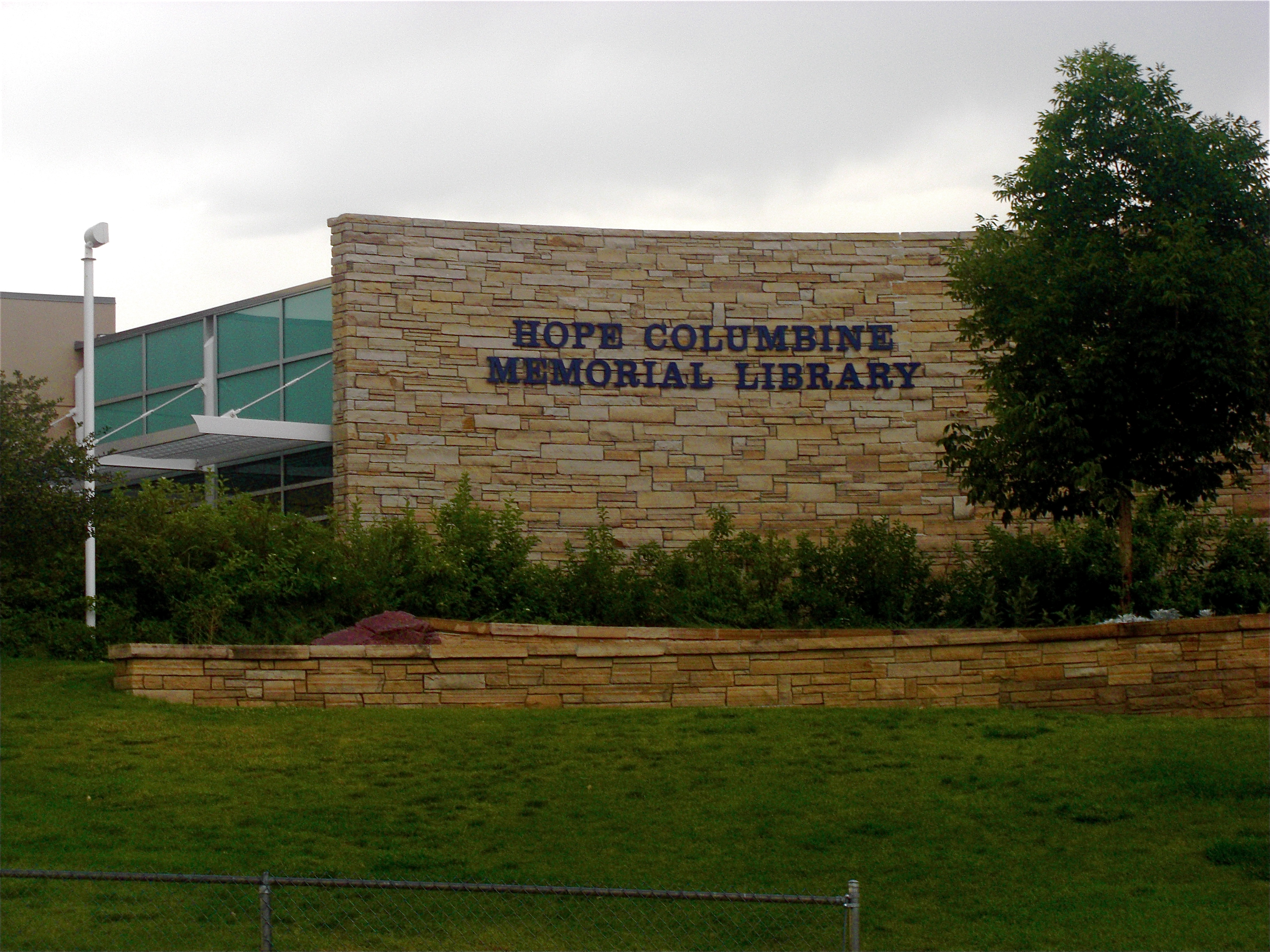
Lyrics referencing the Columbine High School massacre were censored on The Marshall Mathers LP.

In his book Edited Clean Version: Technology and the Culture of Control, author Raiford Guins writes that the clean version of The Marshall Mathers LP "resembles a cross between a cell phone chat with terrible reception...and a noted hip-hop lyricist suffering from an incurable case of hiccups."

This version of the album often either omits words completely or obscures them with added sound effects. The clean version of the album did not censor all profanity. Words like "ass", "bitch", "goddamn", and "shit" were uncensored. However, on the track "The Real Slim Shady", the words "bitch" and "shit" were censored out, as its radio edit was mainly used. References to violence and weapons were also significantly altered, and the titles to the songs "Kill You", "Drug Ballad", and "Bitch Please II" are censored on the back cover. The song "Kim" is removed completely and replaced by "The Kids", a South Park-themed track about drug usage and the American youth which is also featured on the special edition of the album.

Special attention was given to editing aggressive and violent lyrics that were aimed at police, prostitutes, women, homosexuals, bullies, minors, and schools. In response to the attack that had occurred at Columbine High School in April 1999, names of guns and sounds of them firing were censored. Interscope Records insisted on censoring the words "kids" and "Columbine" from the line, "I take seven [kids] from [Columbine], stand them all in line" from "I'm Back", even on the explicit version of the album. Mike Rubin of Spin called the censorship a "curious decision, given that lyrics like 'Take drugs / Rape sluts' are apparently permissible". Eminem commented on his lyrics regarding the shooting, calling the specific Columbine incident "so fucking touchy." He elaborated being saying, "as much sympathy as we give the Columbine shootings, nobody ever looked at it from the fuckin' point of view of the kids who were bullied — I mean, they took their own fucking life! And it was because they were pushed so far to the fucking edge that they were fucking so mad. I've been that mad." The full line appears uncensored in Eminem's song "Rap God" from The Marshall Mathers LP 2, although it remains censored on the clean version.

The line "It doesn't matter, [your attorney Fred Gibson's a] faggot" was also censored from "Marshall Mathers"; the line refers to his mother Debbie Nelson's lawyer, who assisted her in filing a lawsuit against the rapper for defamation regarding lyrics from The Slim Shady LP.

== Commercial performance ==
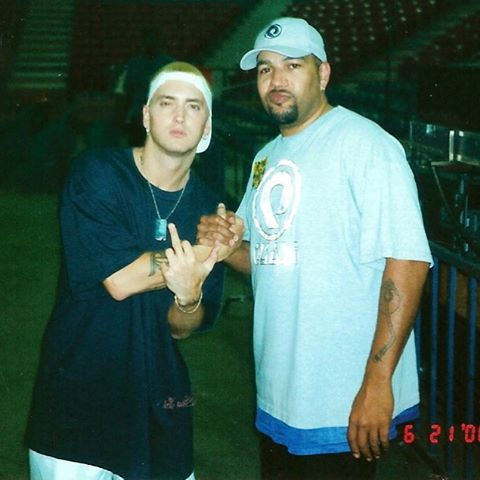
Eminem (left) at the ARCO Arena for the Up in Smoke Tour, in June 2000, a month after the album's release

The Marshall Mathers LP sold 1.76 million copies in the United States its first week, at the time the second-highest single week sales for an album in the SoundScan era, behind only the 2.4 million copies sold by NSYNC's No Strings Attached earlier that year. The album sold more than twice as many copies as the previous record holder for the highest single week sales for a hip hop or rap album, Snoop Dogg's Doggystyle, which sold 806,000 copies in its first week in 1993. It sold over 800,000 copies in its second week, 600,000 copies in its third week, and 520,000 copies in its fourth week for a four-week total of 3.65 million. It also became one of the few albums to sell over 500,000 copies for four consecutive weeks. In total, the album spent eight weeks at number 1 on the US Billboard 200, ranking it fourth on the current all-time list of weeks spent at number 1 by a rap or hip-hop album. It was the second best-selling album of the year, behind No Strings Attached, with 7.9 million copies sold. It was also the best-selling album of 2000 in Canada, selling 679,567 copies.

According to Billboard, as of 2022, The Marshall Mathers LP is one of the 15 best-performing 21st-century albums without any of its singles being number 1 hits on the Billboard Hot 100. The first single, "The Real Slim Shady", became Eminem's biggest hit up to that point. It peaked at number 4 on the Billboard Hot 100 and topped the UK Singles Chart. "The Way I Am", which was released as the album's second single, peaked at number 8 on the UK Singles Chart and 58 on the Billboard Hot 100. "Stan", the third single released from the album, became a number 1 hit in both the United Kingdom and Australia. The song, which details around a crazed fan of the same name, has been highlighted as a work of poetry by critics, and soon gave rise to the Oxford English Dictionary term stan.

The Marshall Mathers LP sold 10.2 million copies in the United States in the 2000s per SoundScan, making it the fourth best-selling album of the decade. As of 2016, the album had sold 11 million copies. The album has also been certified Diamond by the Recording Industry Association of America (RIAA), with 11 million shipments in the United States, making it Eminem's best-selling album in his home country. Worldwide, the album has sold 25 million copies, making it one of the best-selling albums of all time. A sequel, The Marshall Mathers LP 2, was released on November 5, 2013.

== Critical reception ==
Contemporary professional reviews
Aggregate scores
Source	Rating
Metacritic	78/100
Review scores
Source	Rating
Chicago Sun-Times	3.5/4 stars
Entertainment Weekly	A−
Los Angeles Times	3.5/4 stars
Melody Maker	4/5 stars
NME	9/10
Q	3/5 stars
RapReviews	8.5/10
Rolling Stone	4/5 stars
The Source	4/5 stars
USA Today	3/4 stars
The Village Voice	A

According to the review aggregator Metacritic, The Marshall Mathers LP received "generally favorable reviews" based on a weighted average score of 78 out of 100 from 21 critic scores.

Rolling Stone magazine's Touré applauded Dr. Dre's production and Eminem's varied lyrical style on what is a "car-crash record: loud, wild, dangerous, out of control, grotesque, unsettling", but ultimately captivating. Melody Maker said that Eminem's startlingly intense vision of "rap's self-consciousness" is truly unique, while Steve Sutherland of NME praised the album as a misanthropic and "gruelling assault course of lyrical genius" that critiques malevolent aspects of contemporary society. Chuck Eddy from The Village Voice said that Eminem is backed by attractive music and displays an emotionally complex and witting quality unlike his previous work. In the newspaper's consumer guide column, Robert Christgau called him "exceptionally witty and musical, discernibly thoughtful and good-hearted, indubitably dangerous and full of shit", while declaring the album "a work of art whose immense entertainment value in no way compromises its intimations of a pathology that's both personal and political". Will Hermes of Entertainment Weekly wrote that as the first significant popular music album of the 2000s, The Marshall Mathers LP is "indefensible and critic-proof, hypocritical and heartbreaking, unlistenable and undeniable".

On the other hand, music journalist Greg Kot said the reaction to The Marshall Mathers LP was "mixed", or reluctantly positive, among critics who praised Eminem's "verbal skills and transgressive humor" but decried some of the subject matter. In his review for the Los Angeles Times, Robert Hilburn reserved his praise because of homophobic lyrics on what he felt is an otherwise conceptual and personal work, "docked a half star because of the recurring homophobia—something that may be de rigueur in commercial rap, but which still is unacceptable." Steve Jones of USA Today opined that Eminem's "vicious and patently personal lyrical assaults" would "almost grow tedious if he weren't as inventive as he is tasteless." Q magazine felt that the subject matter does not make for an enjoyable listen, even though Eminem's disaffected and nihilistic lyrics can be provocative. Slant Magazine's Sal Cinquemani was more critical in a one-and-a-half star review and found his raps extremely distasteful: "The only thing worse than Eminem's homophobia is the immaturity with which he displays it". On the other hand, Spin felt that the rapping is excellent, but plagued more so by unremarkable music and lackluster tracks.

Among other publications, Rolling Stone and Melody Maker named The Marshall Mathers LP the best album of 2000. In 2000, the album won in the Best Album category at the MTV Europe Music Awards. It also won in the Best Rap Album category at the 43rd Grammy Awards in 2001. The Marshall Mathers LP was nominated for Album of the Year, but lost to jazz-rock duo Steely Dan's Two Against Nature.

== Legacy and reappraisal ==
Retrospective professional reviews
Review scores
Source	Rating
AllMusic	5/5 stars
Encyclopedia of Popular Music	4/5 stars
The Great Rock Discography	9/10
Pitchfork	9.4/10
The Rolling Stone Album Guide	5/5 stars
Sputnikmusic	5/5
Tom Hull – on the Web	A
XXL	XXL (5/5)

Since its initial release, The Marshall Mathers LP has been highly acclaimed in retrospective critic reviews. It has been regarded by critics as Eminem's best album and has been ranked in multiple lists of the greatest albums of all time. In The Rolling Stone Album Guide (2004), Christian Hoard said it "delved much deeper into personal pain [than The Slim Shady LP], and the result was a minor masterpiece that merged iller-than-ill flows with a brilliant sense of the macabre." According to Sputnikmusic's Nick Butler, The Marshall Mathers LP stands as a culturally significant record in American popular music, but also "remains a truly special album, unique in rap's canon, owing its spirit to rock and its heritage to rap, in a way I've rarely heard". Insanul Ahmed of Complex wrote, "At a time when the Billboard charts were dominated by squeaky-clean pop acts like NSYNC and Backstreet Boys, Eminem offered a rebuttal to the hypocritical American mainstream that criticizes rap music while celebrating—and, worse, commercializing—sex, violence, and bigotry in other arenas. This album turned Eminem into a global icon. There was a huge amount of hype and controversy around it But none of that takes away from its musical achievement. This album definitively proved that the Detroit rapper was a gifted lyricist, a brilliant songwriter, and a visionary artist." Mike Elizondo, a former collaborator on Eminem's albums, said, "I felt like Marshall was part of this wave with Quentin Tarantino, Pulp Fiction (1994) and Reservoir Dogs (1992) [...] This next level of art with incredible graphic imagery that Marshall had the ability to paint. Love it or hate it he was obviously very skilled at the stories he was telling."

Jeff Weiss of The Ringer wrote, "The Marshall Mathers LP certified Eminem as an alienated voice of a generation, a caustic wedge issue distilling the spirits of Elvis, Holden Caulfield, Johnny Rotten, Kurt Cobain, Cartman from South Park, and Tupac if he shopped at Kroger. In a postmodern abyss where everything's performative, it might have been the last album that possessed the capacity to genuinely shock." Dan Ozzi of Vice highlighted that "Eminem was the one artist high school kids seemed to unanimously connect with. [...] he represented everything high school years are about: blind rage, misguided rebellion, adolescent frustration. He was like a human middle finger. An X-rated Dennis the Menace for a dial-up modem generation." Max Bell of Spin wrote that the album remains "one of the most critically-acclaimed, commercially-successful, and influential albums in rap history", citing rappers influenced by the album, such as Tyler, the Creator, Earl Sweatshirt, Kendrick Lamar, and Juice WRLD. Bonsu Thompson of Medium described the album as "a masterful confluence of punk, bluegrass, and subterranean hip-hop that gave life to a singular brand of Americana rap." Thompson further praised the album's impact on white rappers, saying, "For a snapshot of the album's seismic influence, compare the pre–Marshall Mathers LP decade of White rappers like Everlast and MC Serch with the post-2000 landscape of Action Bronson, G-Eazy, and the late Mac Miller [...] Eminem homogenized the White rapper."

Eminem's upending of the mainstream, particularly through the release of The Marshall Mathers LP, earned him countless enemies. From religious groups to government officials, he faced no shortage of protesters, but while Middle America – as well as occupants of other suburban areas around the world – hated him, their kids loved him, his music and his rebellious nature. You can love him or loathe him, but the fact we're still talking about The Marshall Mathers LP 20 years later speaks to its undeniable impact.

— Will Lavin of NME, speaking on The Marshall Mathers LP

In 2003, The Marshall Mathers LP was ranked number 302 on Rolling Stone's list of The 500 Greatest Albums of All Time; it was moved up to number 244 in the magazine's revised 2012 edition of the list, and moved to 145 on the 2020 edition. IGN named it the twenty-fourth greatest rap album of all time in a 2004 list. In 2006, The Marshall Mathers LP was included by Time in its list of the 100 Greatest Albums of All Time. That same year, Q ranked it number 85 on a list of The Greatest Albums of All Time, the highest position held by any hip-hop album on the list. The Marshall Mathers LP was also the highest ranked hip-hop album on the National Association of Recording Merchandisers & the Rock and Roll Hall of Fame's list of the 200 Definitive Albums of All Time, where it was placed at number 28. It has been named one of the Top 100 Albums of the Decade (2000s) by Rolling Stone, who ranked it seventh, Complex Magazine, who ranked it fourth, and Pitchfork, who ranked it 119th. The Guardian ranked the album at 29 on its Top 50 Albums of the decade. The A.V. Club ranked the album at 36 on its Best Albums of the Decade list. Popdose listed The Marshall Mathers LP as the 10th best album of the decade. Spinner ranked the album at 22 on its Best Albums of the 2000s list. In 2010, Rhapsody ranked it at number 1 on their list of "The 10 Best Albums by White Rappers". In 2015, the album was ranked number 81 by About.com on their list of 100 Best Hip-Hop Albums of All Time. In 2020, The Marshall Mathers LP was included at the 100 Best Albums of the 21st Century list of Stacker, being ranked at 69. The album was also included in the book 1001 Albums You Must Hear Before You Die. In 2022, it was ranked 25 by Rolling Stone on their list "The 200 Greatest Rap Albums of All Time". In a 2024 ranking of Eminem's 12 studio albums, Damien Scott of Billboard magazine placed The Marshall Mathers LP first, concluding: "It's the definitive Eminem album, the one by which all others are measured. If you've never listened to Eminem and are looking for a place to start, begin with this."

== Controversies ==
Nobody is excluded from my poking at. Nobody. I don't discriminate, I don't exclude nobody. If you do something fucked up, you're bound to be made fun of. If I do something fucked up, I'll make fun of myself—I'm not excluded from this.

— Eminem, on the album's controversy.

While the album was hugely controversial and criticized, the album propelled Eminem to the forefront of American pop culture. At a United States Senate hearing, Lynne Cheney criticized Eminem and sponsor Seagram for "promot[ing] violence of the most degrading kind against women", labeling him as "a rap singer who advocates murder and rape". She specifically cited lyrics from "Kill You", explaining, "He talks about murdering and raping his mother. He talks about choking women slowly so he can hear their screams for a long time. He talks about using O.J.'s machete on women, and this is a man who is honored by the recording industry". Cheney drew a link between the Columbine massacre and violent music, mentioning artists Eminem and Marilyn Manson as musicians who contribute to the United States' culture of violence. Although she stated that she has "long been a vocal supporter of free speech", Cheney called for the music industry to impose age-restrictions on those who can purchase music with violent content.

On October 26, 2000, Eminem was on the co-headlining Anger Management Tour with Limp Bizkit and scheduled to perform at a concert in Toronto's SkyDome. However, Ontario Attorney General Jim Flaherty argued that Canada should stop Eminem at the border. "I personally don't want anyone coming to Canada who will come here and advocate violence against women", he said. Flaherty claims to have been "disgusted" when reading transcriptions of Eminem's song "Kill You", which includes lines like "Slut, you think I won't choke no whore/till the vocal cords don't work in her throat no more?" Eminem's fans argued that this was a matter of free speech and that he was unfairly singled out. Michael Bryant suggested that the government let Eminem perform and then prosecute him for violating Canada's hate crime laws, despite the fact that Canada's hate-crime legislation does not include violence against women. In an editorial in The Globe and Mail, author Robert Everett-Green wrote, "Being offensive is Eminem's job description." Eminem was granted entry into Canada.

A 2001 and 2004 study by Edward Armstrong found that of the 14 songs on The Marshall Mathers LP, eleven contain violent and misogynistic lyrics and nine depict killing women through choking, stabbing, drowning, shooting, head and throat splitting. According to the study, Eminem scores 78% for violent misogyny while gangsta rap music in general reaches 22%. Armstrong argues that violent misogyny characterizes most of Eminem's music and that the rapper "authenticates his self-presentations by outdoing other gangsta rappers in terms of his violent misogyny." A fifteen-year-old boy in Fresno, California, was arrested in September 2015 for making terrorist threats, after sharing the Columbine-related lyrics to "I'm Back" on Instagram.

=== Reactions from other artists ===
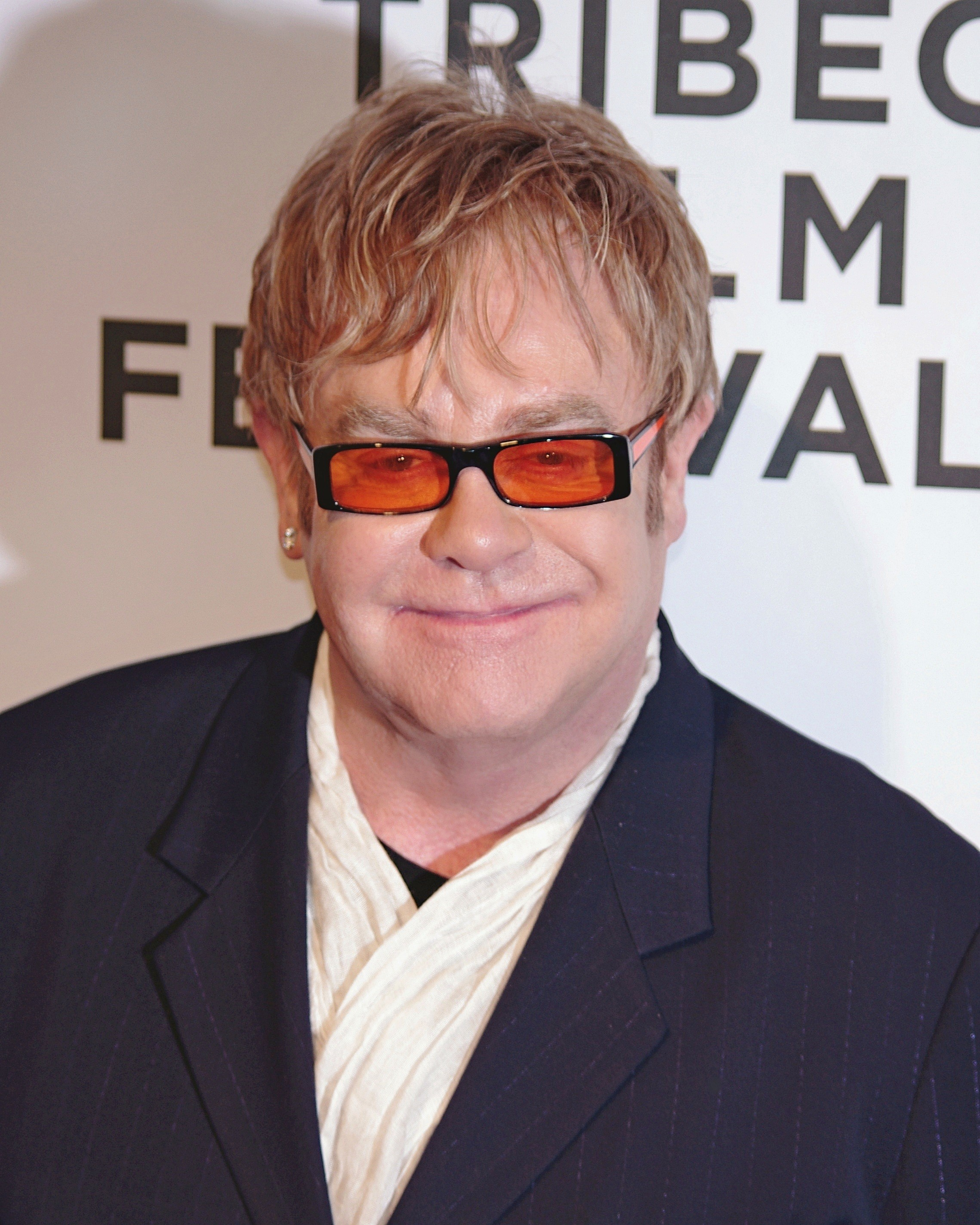
Elton John performed "Stan" with Eminem at the Grammys despite negative reactions from the LGBT community.

Protests against the album's content reached a climax when it was nominated for four Grammy Awards in 2001 including Album of the Year. At the ceremony, Eminem performed "Stan" in a duet with openly gay artist Elton John playing piano and singing the chorus. This performance was a direct response to claims by GLAAD and others who claimed his lyrics were homophobic, with Eminem stating, "Of course I'd heard of Elton John, but I didn't know he was gay. I didn't know anything about his personal life. I didn't really care, but being that he was gay and he had my back, I think it made a statement in itself saying that he understood where I was coming from." GLAAD did not change its position, however, and spoke out against Elton John's decision. Despite significant protests and debate, The Marshall Mathers LP went on to win Best Rap Album.

In a 2001 interview with Spin magazine, Johnny Cash defended Eminem against accusations that the album encouraged violence, pointing out that the most popular song of the 19th century was the violent folk song "Jesse James". Cash added that nobody had re-enacted the murder portrayed in his own "Folsom Prison Blues".

Singer Christina Aguilera was upset about the lyric, "Christina Aguilera better switch me chairs so I can sit next to Carson Daly and Fred Durst / and hear 'em argue over who she gave head to first" from "The Real Slim Shady", calling the rapper's claim "disgusting, offensive and, above all, not true". Eminem included this line after becoming angry with the singer for informing the public during an MTV special without his consent about the rapper's secret marriage to Kim Mathers. However, the two later settled their differences after hugging backstage at the 2002 MTV Video Music Awards, with the singer appearing at the premiere of 8 Mile months later.

In 2002, French jazz pianist Jacques Loussier filed a $10 million lawsuit against Eminem that was later settled out of court. The lawsuit claimed the beat for "Kill You" was stolen from his song "Pulsion".

== Track listing ==
Credits adapted from the album's liner notes and Tidal

The Marshall Mathers LP track listing
No.	Title	Writer(s)	Producer(s)	Length
1.	"Public Service Announcement 2000"			0:25
2.	"Kill You"	Marshall Mathers; Andre Young; Melvin Bradford	Dr. Dre; Mel-Man	4:24
3.	"Stan" (featuring Dido)	Mathers; Dido Armstrong; Mark James; Paul Herman	The 45 King; Eminem^{[a]}	6:44
4.	"Paul (skit)"			0:10
5.	"Who Knew"	Mathers; Young; Bradford	Dr. Dre; Mel-Man	3:47
6.	"Steve Berman (skit)"			0:53
7.	"The Way I Am"	Mathers	Eminem	4:50
8.	"The Real Slim Shady"	Mathers; Young; Bradford; Tommy Coster; Mike Elizondo	Dr. Dre; Mel-Man	4:44
9.	"Remember Me?" (featuring RBX and Sticky Fingaz)	Mathers; Eric Collins; Kirk Jones; Young; Bradford	Dr. Dre; Mel-Man	3:38
10.	"I'm Back"	Mathers; Young; Bradford	Dr. Dre; Mel-Man	5:09
11.	"Marshall Mathers"	Mathers; Jeffrey "Jeff" Bass; Mark "Marky" Bass	Eminem; F.B.T.	5:21
12.	"Ken Kaniff (skit)"			1:01
13.	"Drug Ballad" (featuring Dina Rae^{[b]})	Mathers; J. Bass; M. Bass	Eminem; F.B.T.	5:00
14.	"Amityville" (featuring Bizarre)	Mathers; Rufus Johnson; J. Bass; M. Bass	Eminem; F.B.T.	4:14
15.	"Bitch Please II" (featuring Dr. Dre, Snoop Dogg, Xzibit and Nate Dogg)	Mathers; Young; Calvin Broadus, Jr.; Alvin Joyner; Nathaniel Hale; Elizondo	Dr. Dre	4:48
16.	"Kim"	Mathers; J. Bass; M. Bass	F.B.T.	6:17
17.	"Under the Influence" (featuring D12)	Mathers; DeShaun Holton; Johnson; Ondre Moore; Von Carlisle; Denaun Porter; J. Bass; M. Bass	Eminem; F.B.T.	5:21
18.	"Criminal"	Mathers; J. Bass; M. Bass	Eminem; F.B.T.	5:19
Total length:				72:17

Bonus track
No.	Title	Writer(s)	Producer(s)	Length
19.	"The Kids"	Mathers; J. Bass; M. Bass; Steve King	Eminem; F.B.T.	5:06
Total length:				77:23

Notes

- ^{^[a]} signifies a co-producer
- ^{^[b]} Dina Rae is uncredited
- Limited edition includes a bonus disc which features the instrumental versions of "The Real Slim Shady", "The Way I Am" and "Stan", the explicit version of "The Kids" and the Danny Lohner Remix of "The Way I Am" with Marilyn Manson, as well as the music videos of "The Real Slim Shady", "The Way I Am" and "Stan".
- 25th Anniversary edition includes the Live From MTV VMAs/2000 version of "The Real Slim Shady" and "The Way I Am" as bonus tracks.

== Personnel ==
Credits adapted from the album's liner notes and Tidal

- Eminem – vocals (tracks 1–3, 5–19), production (tracks 1, 7, 11, 13, 14, 17–19), mixing (tracks 3, 14, 17, 19), co-production (track 3)
- Dr. Dre – mixing (tracks 1, 2, 4–6, 8–13, 15, 16, 18), production (tracks 2, 5, 6, 8–10, 12, 15), vocals (track 15)
- Richard "Segal" Huredia – engineering (tracks 2, 3, 5–18)
- Mike Elizondo – bass (tracks 2, 3, 5, 7–10, 14, 15), guitar (tracks 7, 8), keyboards (tracks 15)
- F.B.T. – production (tracks 1, 11, 13, 14, 16–19)
- Mel-Man – production (tracks 2, 5, 6, 8–10, 12)
- Jim McCrone – engineering assistance (tracks 2, 5, 8, 10, 14, 15)
- Thomas Coster Jr. – keyboards (tracks 2, 5, 7, 8, 10, 12)
- DJ Head – drum programming (tracks 11, 13, 14, 17–19)
- Michelle Forbes – engineering assistance (tracks 6, 8, 12)
- Sean Cruse – guitar (tracks 2, 3)
- John Bigham – guitar (tracks 5, 10)
- Jeff Bass – vocals (track 1)
- The 45 King – production (track 3)
- Dido – vocals (track 3)
- Paul "Bunyan" Rosenberg – spoken word (track 4)
- Steve Berman – vocals (track 6)
- Thomas Rounds – engineering assistance (track 7)
- RBX – vocals (track 9)
- Sticky Fingaz – vocals (track 9)
- Camara Kambon – keyboards (track 9)
- Dina Rae – vocals (track 13)
- Bizarre – vocals (track 14)
- Snoop Dogg – vocals (track 15)
- Xzibit – vocals (track 15)
- Nate Dogg – vocals (track 15)
- D-12 – vocals (track 17)
- Mike Butler – engineering (track 17)
- Aaron Lepley – engineering (track 17)

Credits

- Dr. Dre – executive production
- Paul D. Rosenberg, Esq. – Eminem management
- Joel Martin – F.B.T. productions management
- Joe Mama-Nitzberg – photography and art coordination
- Jason Noto – art direction and design
- Jonathan "Xtra Gangsta" Mannion – photography
- Karen Pinegar – F.B.T. assistance
- Sarah Catlett – F.B.T. assistance
- Richard Segal Huredia – engineering
- Steve King – engineering
- Chris Conway – engineering
- Mike Butler – engineering
- Lance Pierre – engineering
- Rob Ebeling – engineering
- James McCrone – engineering
- Aaron Lepley – engineering
- Rich Behrens – engineering
- Michelle Forbes – engineering
- Akane Nakamura – engineering
- Brian "Big Bass" Gardner – mastering
- Cara Lewis – Eminem booking
- Marc Labelle – Eminem road management

== Charts ==
=== Weekly charts ===
Chart (2000–2001)	Peak position
Australian Albums (ARIA)	1
Australian Urban Albums (ARIA)	1
Austrian Albums (Ö3 Austria)	1
Belgian Albums (Ultratop Flanders)	1
Belgian Albums (Ultratop Wallonia)	3
Canadian Albums (Billboard)	1
Canadian R&B Albums (Nielsen SoundScan)	1
Danish Albums (Hitlisten)	1
Dutch Albums (Album Top 100)	2
European Top 100 Albums	1
Finnish Albums (Suomen virallinen lista)	1
French Albums (SNEP)	2
German Albums (Offizielle Top 100)	3
Greek Albums (IFPI Greece)	1
Hungarian Albums (MAHASZ)	3
Irish Albums (IRMA)	1
Italian Albums (FIMI)	7
Japanese Albums (Oricon)	52
New Zealand Albums (RMNZ)	1
Norwegian Albums (VG-lista)	3
Polish Albums (ZPAV)	9
Portuguese Albums (AFP)	2
South African Albums (RISA)	1
Spanish Albums (AFYVE)	6
Swedish Albums (Sverigetopplistan)	2
Swiss Albums (Schweizer Hitparade)	2
UK Albums (Official Charts)	1
UK R&B Albums (Official Charts)	1
US Billboard 200	1
US Top R&B/Hip-Hop Albums (Billboard)	1

Chart (2002)	Position
US Top Catalog Albums (Billboard)	1

=== Year-end charts ===
Year-end chart performance for The Marshall Mathers LP
Chart (2000)	Position
Australian Albums (ARIA)	30
Austrian Albums (Ö3 Austria)	12
Belgian Albums (Ultratop Flanders)	9
Belgian Albums (Ultratop Wallonia)	12
Canadian Albums (Nielsen SoundScan)	1
Danish Albums (Hitlisten)	20
Dutch Albums (Album Top 100)	5
European Albums (Music & Media)	4
French Albums (SNEP)	10
German Albums (Offizielle Top 100)	12
New Zealand Albums (RMNZ)	9
Norwegian End-of-School Period Albums (VG-lista)	5
Norwegian Spring Period Albums (VG-lista)	8
Norwegian Summer Period Albums (VG-lista)	1
South Korean International Albums (MIAK)	41
Swedish Albums & Compilations (Sverigetopplistan)	3
Swiss Albums (Schweizer Hitparade)	12
UK Albums (OCC)	3
US Billboard 200	3
US Top R&B/Hip-Hop Albums (Billboard)	2
Worldwide Albums (IFPI)	2

Chart (2001)	Position
Australian Albums (ARIA)	12
Australian Hip Hop/R&B Albums (ARIA)	3
Austrian Albums (Ö3 Austria)	7
Belgian Albums (Ultratop Flanders)	9
Belgian Albums (Ultratop Wallonia)	9
Canadian Albums (Nielsen SoundScan)	107
Canadian R&B Albums (Nielsen SoundScan)	25
Canadian Rap Albums (Nielsen SoundScan)	12
Danish Albums (Hitlisten)	46
Dutch Albums (Album Top 100)	44
European Albums (Music & Media)	5
French Albums (SNEP)	58
German Albums (Offizielle Top 100)	24
Italian Albums (FIMI)	40
New Zealand Albums (RMNZ)	24
Spanish Albums (AFYVE)	37
Swedish Albums (Sverigetopplistan)	90
Swiss Albums (Schweizer Hitparade)	17
UK Albums (OCC)	40
US Billboard 200	72
US Top R&B/Hip-Hop Albums (Billboard)	65

Chart (2002)	Position
Australian Hip Hop/R&B Albums (ARIA)	12
Canadian Alternative Albums (Nielsen SoundScan)	87
Canadian R&B Albums (Nielsen SoundScan)	50
Canadian Rap Albums (Nielsen SoundScan)	26

Chart (2003)	Position
Australian Hip Hop/R&B Albums (ARIA)	16
German Albums (Offizielle Top 100)	74
UK Albums (OCC)	169

Chart (2011)	Position
US Billboard 200	199
US Catalog Albums (Billboard)	16

Chart (2014)	Position
US Catalog Albums (Billboard)	28

Chart (2019)	Position
Australian Hip Hop/R&B Albums (ARIA)	72
New Zealand Albums (RMNZ)	43

Chart (2022)	Position
Belgian Albums (Ultratop Flanders)	197
Lithuanian Albums (AGATA)	69
Swedish Albums (Sverigetopplistan)	74

Chart (2023)	Position
Belgian Albums (Ultratop Flanders)	175

Chart (2024)	Position
Belgian Albums (Ultratop Flanders)	184

=== Decade-end charts ===
Chart (2000–2009)	Position
Australian Albums (ARIA)	79
UK Albums (OCC)	16
US Billboard 200	7
US Top Hip-Hop/R&B Albums (Billboard)	2

== Certifications and sales ==
Region	Certification	Certified units/sales
Argentina (CAPIF)	Gold	38,000
Australia (ARIA)	7× Platinum	490,000^{‡}
Austria (IFPI Austria)	Platinum	50,000^{*}
Belgium (BRMA)	2× Platinum	100,000^{*}
Brazil (Pro-Música Brasil)	Gold	100,000^{*}
Canada (Music Canada)	8× Platinum	800,000^{^}
Central America (CFC)	Platinum	
Denmark (IFPI Danmark)	6× Platinum	120,000^{‡}
Finland (Musiikkituottajat)	Platinum	40,055
France (SNEP)	2× Platinum	600,000^{*}
Germany (BVMI)	3× Platinum	900,000^{‡}
Greece (IFPI Greece)	Gold	15,000^{^}
Hungary (MAHASZ)	Gold	
Italy 2000-2001 sales	—	200,000
Italy (FIMI) sales since 2009	Platinum	50,000^{‡}
Japan (RIAJ)	Platinum	200,000^{^}
Mexico (AMPROFON)	Platinum	150,000^{^}
Netherlands (NVPI)	Platinum	80,000^{^}
New Zealand (RMNZ)	5× Platinum	75,000^{^}
Norway (IFPI Norway)	2× Platinum	100,000^{*}
Poland (ZPAV)	Platinum	100,000^{*}
South Africa (RISA)	2× Platinum	100,000^{*}
South Korea	—	106,486
Spain (Promusicae)	Platinum	100,000^{^}
Sweden (GLF)	2× Platinum	160,000^{^}
Switzerland (IFPI Switzerland)	4× Platinum	200,000^{^}
United Kingdom (BPI)	9× Platinum	2,700,000^{‡}
United States (RIAA)	11× Platinum	12,540,000
Summaries
Europe (IFPI)	6× Platinum	6,000,000^{*}
^{*} Sales figures based on certification alone.^{^} Shipments figures based on certification alone.^{‡} Sales+streaming figures based on certification alone.

== See also ==
- Grammy Award for Best Rap Album
- List of fastest-selling albums
- List of best-selling albums in the United States
- List of best-selling albums of the 2000s (decade) in the United Kingdom
- List of best-selling albums
- The Marshall Mathers LP 2
- Misogyny in rap music
