= Deborah Servitto =

American judge (born 1956)

Deborah A. Servitto, born February 17, 1956, in Sewickley, Pennsylvania, is a Judge on the Michigan Court of Appeals, District II. She received national attention when, as a Macomb County Circuit Court judge, she delivered her ruling in the case of Bailey v. Mathers partially in the form of a rap rhyme.

== Judicial career ==
Servitto served as a judge on the 37th District Court from 1986 to 1990, then on Macomb Circuit Court from 1990 until 2006. In March 2006 Servitto was appointed to District II of the Michigan Court of Appeals which covers Oakland, Macomb and Genesee Counties. She was elected for a full six-year term in November 2006, then re-elected in 2012. She also served as a judge in the inaugural term of the Michigan Court of Claims. Servitto holds a B.A. in Political Science from Oakland University and a J.D. from the Detroit College of Law (now the Michigan State University College of Law).

== Bailey v. Mathers ==
As a circuit court judge, Servitto presided over a case in which DeAngelo Bailey sued Eminem (real name Marshall Mathers) over allegedly defamatory lines in the song "Brain Damage" from the 1999 album, The Slim Shady LP that said "I was harassed daily by this fat kid named D'Angelo Bailey. An eighth-grader who acted obnoxious, cause his father boxes. So every day he'd shove me in the lockers."

Servitto's October 17, 2003 opinion dismissing the case became well known because part of the decision is written in rap-like verse. Servitto's rhyme included the lines: "Mr. Bailey complains that his rap is trash / So he's seeking compensation in the form of cash / Bailey thinks he's entitled to some monetary gain / Because Eminem used his name in vain" and "the lyrics are stories no-one would take as fact / They're an exaggeration of a childish act / It is therefore this court's ultimate position / That Eminem is entitled to summary disposition."
