= The Slim Shady LP =

1999 studio album by Eminem

Studio album by Eminem
- Released: February 23, 1999
- Recorded: 1997–1998
- Studios: Studio 8 (Ferndale, Michigan)
- Genres: Hip-hop; horrorcore
- Length: 59:39
- Labels: Aftermath; WEB; Interscope
- Producers: Eminem; Dr. Dre; Bass Brothers; Denaun Porter; DJ Head; DJ Rec; Justin Trugman; Mel-Man

Eminem chronology
Slim Shady EP (1997)	The Slim Shady LP (1999)	The Marshall Mathers LP (2000)

Singles from The Slim Shady LP
- 1. "My Name Is" Released: January 25, 1999; 2. "Role Model" Released: May 26, 1999; 3. "Guilty Conscience" Released: June 8, 1999

The Slim Shady LP is the second studio album by American rapper Eminem. It was released through Aftermath Entertainment, WEB Entertainment, and Interscope Records on February 23, 1999. Recorded in Ferndale, Michigan, following Eminem's recruitment by Dr. Dre and Jimmy Iovine, the album features production from Eminem himself, alongside Dr. Dre and the Bass Brothers. Featuring hip-hop and horrorcore musical styles, the majority of The Slim Shady LP's lyrical content was written from the perspective of Eminem's alter ego, named Slim Shady. Slim Shady was introduced on Eminem's Slim Shady EP (1997) and concluded on his studio album The Death of Slim Shady (Coup de Grâce) (2024).

The Slim Shady LP contains cartoonish depictions of violence and heavy use of profanity, which Eminem described as horror film–esque, solely for entertainment value. Although many of the lyrics on the album are considered to be satirical, Eminem also discusses his frustrations of living in poverty. "My Name Is" was released as the album's second single and became Eminem's first entry on the US Billboard Hot 100.

Commercially, The Slim Shady LP charted within the top 10 in Belgium, Canada, the United Kingdom, and the United States as well as the top 20 in Austria and the Netherlands. The album was largely acclaimed by critics, with praise directed at Eminem for his unique and fresh lyrical style, dark humor lyrics, and unusual personality. The album garnered Eminem his first awards of his career, including Best Rap Album and Best Rap Solo Performance (for "My Name Is") at the 2000 Grammy Awards. Eminem was also nominated for the Brit Award for International Male Solo Artist.

The Slim Shady LP has received multi-platinum certifications within Australia, Canada, New Zealand, the United Kingdom, and the United States. While its success turned Eminem from an underground rapper into a high-profile celebrity, he became a highly controversial figure due to his lyrical content, which some perceived to be misogynistic and a negative influence on American youth. Despite this, the album is often mentioned in lists of the greatest albums of all time.

== Background ==
Eminem, whose real name is Marshall Bruce Mathers III, began rapping at age 14. In 1996, he released his debut studio album, Infinite, which was recorded at the Bassmint, a recording studio owned by the Bass Brothers. The album was released under their independent record label, WEB Entertainment. Infinite was a commercial failure and was largely ignored by Detroit radio stations. This experience greatly influenced Eminem's lyrical style:

After that record, every rhyme I wrote got angrier and angrier. A lot of it was because of the feedback I got. Motherfuckers was like, "You're a white boy, what the fuck are you rapping for? Why don't you go into rock & roll?" All that type of shit started pissing me off.

After the release of Infinite, Eminem's personal struggles and abuse of drugs and alcohol culminated in a suicide attempt. The failure of Infinite inspired him to create the alter ego Slim Shady: "Boom, the name hit me, and right away I thought of all these words to rhyme with it." Slim Shady served as Eminem's vent for his frustration and rage to the world. In the spring of 1997, he recorded the eight-song extended play Slim Shady EP. During this time, Eminem and his girlfriend Kim Scott lived in a high-crime neighborhood with their newborn daughter Hailie, where their house was burglarized numerous times. After being evicted from his home, Eminem traveled to Los Angeles to participate in the Rap Olympics, an annual nationwide rap battle competition. He placed second, and the staff at Interscope Records who attended the Rap Olympics sent a copy of the Slim Shady EP to company CEO Jimmy Iovine. Iovine played the tape for hip-hop producer Dr. Dre, founder of Aftermath Entertainment. Dr. Dre recalled: "In my entire career in the music industry, I have never found anything from a demo tape or a CD. When Jimmy played this, I said, 'Find him. Now.'" Some urged Dr. Dre not to take a chance on Eminem because he was white. Dr. Dre responded: "I don't give a fuck if you're purple. If you can kick it, I'm working with you."

== Recording ==
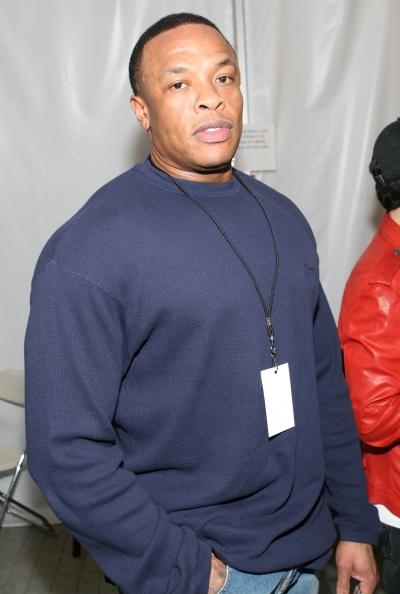
Eminem had idolized The Slim Shady LP co-producer Dr. Dre (pictured here in 2008) since he was a teenager.

The Slim Shady LP was recorded at Studio 8 at 430 8 Mile Road in Ferndale, Michigan. Eminem, who had idolized Dr. Dre since listening to his group N.W.A as a teenager, was nervous to work with him on the album: "I didn't want to be starstruck or kiss his ass too much ... I'm just a little white boy from Detroit. I had never seen stars, let alone Dr. Dre." However, Eminem became more comfortable working with Dr. Dre after a series of highly productive recording sessions. The recording process generally began with Dr. Dre creating a beat and Eminem using the tracks as a template for his freestyle raps; "Every beat he would make, I had a rhyme for", Eminem recalled. He later said: "Every time I sat down with a pen, everything was just like 'fuck you, fuck this, fuck them, fuck that, fuck the world, fuck what everybody thinks. Fuck them.' " On the first day of recording, Eminem and Dr. Dre finished "My Name Is" in an hour. Three other songs, including "Role Model", were also recorded that day.

"'97 Bonnie & Clyde", which was formerly featured on the Slim Shady EP as "Just the Two of Us", was re-recorded for The Slim Shady LP to feature his daughter Hailie's vocals. Because the song focuses on disposing of his girlfriend's corpse, Eminem was not comfortable with explaining the situation to Kim Scott, and instead told her that he would be taking Hailie to Chuck E. Cheese's. He explained, "When she found out I used our daughter to write a song about killing her, she fucking blew. We had just got back together for a couple of weeks. Then I played her the song and she bugged the fuck out." Eminem also said, "When [Hailie] gets old enough, I'm going to explain it to her. I'll let her know that Mommy and Daddy weren't getting along at the time. None of it was to be taken too literally, although at the time I wanted to fucking do it." Eminem asked Marilyn Manson to guest appear on the song, but the singer declined because he felt that the song was "too misogynistic". The song "Guilty Conscience" contains a humorous reference to an occasion in which Dr. Dre assaulted Dee Barnes. Having only known Dr. Dre for a few days, Eminem was anxious about how he would react to such a line, and to his relief, Dr. Dre "fell out of his chair laughing" upon hearing the lyric.

"Ken Kaniff", a skit involving a prank call to Eminem, featured fellow Detroit rapper Aristotle. After a falling out between the two in the wake of Eminem's breakthrough success, Eminem instead played Ken Kaniff on skits on future albums. Ken Kaniff would end up appearing in more Eminem albums over the course of his career and was last heard in The Death of Slim Shady (Coup de Grâce) (2024). Another skit, "Bitch", is an answering machine message in which Zoe Winkler, daughter of actor Henry Winkler, tells a friend that she was disgusted by Eminem's music. He met and had dinner with her in order to get permission to use the recording on the album. During the mixing process of The Slim Shady LP, at the same time, Kid Rock was recording his fourth studio album, Devil Without a Cause (1998); being friends with Kid Rock, Eminem asked Kid Rock to record scratching for Eminem's song "My Fault"; in return, Eminem delivered a guest rap verse on Kid Rock's song "Fuck Off" for Devil Without a Cause.

=== Production ===
"My Name Is"
A 26-second song sample of "My Name Is". The song samples British artist Labi Siffre's song "I Got The" and features a prominent bassline as well as psychedelic-style keyboard sounds.

The Slim Shady LP's production was handled primarily by Dr. Dre, the Bass Brothers, and Eminem. The beats have been compared to West Coast hip-hop and G-funk musical styles. Kyle Anderson of MTV wrote that "The beats are full of bass-heavy hallucinations and create huge, scary sandboxes that allow Em to play." According to the staff at IGN, "'97 Bonnie & Clyde" is backed by the "lulling serenity of a super silky groove". "Cum on Everybody"; which features guest vocals from American singer Dina Rae contains an upbeat dance rhythm, while "My Name Is", which is built around a sample from British musician Labi Siffre's "I Got The...", features a prominent bassline and psychedelic-style keyboards. "I'm Shady" was originally written over a Sade track, but after hearing a sample of Curtis Mayfield's "Pusherman" in Ice-T's song "I'm Your Pusher", Eminem decided it would be more fitting to use "Pusherman".

Eminem's vocal inflection on the album has been described as a "nasal whine"; Jon Pareles of The New York Times likened his "calmly sarcastic delivery" to "the early Beastie Boys turned cynical". Writing for the Chicago Tribune, columnist Greg Kot compared the rapper's vocals to "Pee-wee Herman with a nasal Midwestern accent". A skit entitled "Lounge" appears before "My Fault" featuring Eminem and the Bass Brothers imitating rat pack crooners. Jeff Bass came up with the line "I never meant to give you mushrooms" for the skit, which in turn inspired Eminem to write "My Fault".

== Lyrical themes ==
"Rock Bottom"
This song talks about Eminem's past troubles with money. This and many other themes are the basis for the album.

Many of the songs from The Slim Shady LP are written from the perspective of Eminem's alter ego, Slim Shady, and contain cartoonish depictions of violence, which he refers to as "made-up tales of trailer-park stuff". The rapper explained that this subject matter is intended for entertainment value, likening his music to the horror film genre: "Why can't people see that records can be like movies? The only difference between some of my raps and movies is that they aren't on a screen." Some of the lyrics have also been considered to be misogynistic by critics and commentators. Eminem acknowledged the accusations, and clarified, "I have a fairly salty relationship with women ... But most of the time, when I'm saying shit about women, when I'm saying 'bitches' and 'hoes', it's so ridiculous that I'm taking the stereotypical rapper to the extreme. I don't hate women in general. They just make me mad sometimes." Despite the album's explicit nature, Eminem refused to say the word "nigga" on the album, noting, "It's not in my vocabulary." The Slim Shady LP begins with a "Public Service Announcement" introduction performed by producer Jeff Bass of the Bass Brothers, and serves as a sarcastic disclaimer discussing the album's explicit lyrical content. Later in the album, a skit entitled "Paul" features a phone call from Paul Rosenberg to Eminem telling him to "tone down" his lyrics.

"Guilty Conscience" is a concept song featuring Dr. Dre. The song focuses on a series of characters who are faced with various situations, while Dr. Dre and Eminem serve as the "angel" and "devil" sides of the characters' conscience, respectively. The song draws inspiration from a scene in the 1978 comedy film National Lampoon's Animal House, in which a man takes advice from an angel and devil on his shoulder while considering raping an unconscious girl at a party. In the film, he ends up deciding not to go through with the rape, but in "Guilty Conscience", the outcome is unclear. On "My Fault", Eminem tells the story of a girl who overdoses on psychedelic mushrooms at a rave. "'97 Bonnie & Clyde" features Eminem convincing his infant daughter to assist him in disposing of his wife's corpse. It is an epilogue to the song "Kim", although "'97 Bonnie & Clyde" was released first. Eminem wrote the song at a time in which he felt that Kim Scott was stopping him from seeing his daughter. Reviewer Stephen Thomas Erlewine of AllMusic explained that "There have been more violent songs in rap, but few more disturbing, and it's not because of what it describes, it's how he describes it -- how the perfectly modulated phrasing enhances the horror and black humor of his words." On the song "Brain Damage", Eminem discusses his childhood experiences with bullies at school, particularly recalling a traumatic incident where he sustained a serious concussion after he was severely beaten by a bully.

Although many of the lyrics on the album are intended to be humorous, several songs depict Eminem's frustrations with living in poverty. When discussing The Slim Shady LP, Anthony Bozza of Rolling Stone described Eminem as "probably the only MC in 1999 who boasts low self-esteem. His rhymes are jaw-droppingly perverse, bespeaking a minimum-wage life devoid of hope, flushed with rage and weaned on sci-fi and slasher flicks." Eminem was inspired to write "Rock Bottom" after being fired from his cooking job at a restaurant days before his daughter's birthday. The song bemoans human dependency on money, discussing its ability to brainwash an individual. He illustrates his struggles to provide for his daughter, describing himself as "discouraged, hungry, and malnourished." "If I Had" follows a similar theme, as he describes living on minimum wage and remarks that he is "tired of jobs starting off at $5.50 an hour". In the song, he expresses his irritation with fitting the "white trash" stereotype.

== Critical reception ==
Professional ratings
Review scores
Source	Rating
AllMusic	5/5 stars
Chicago Sun-Times	4/4 stars
Christgau's Consumer Guide	A−
Entertainment Weekly	C+
Los Angeles Times	3.5/4 stars
Melody Maker	4/5 stars
NME	3/5 stars
Q	2/5 stars
Rolling Stone	3.5/5 stars
The Rolling Stone Album Guide	4/5 stars
Spin	8/10

Upon its release, The Slim Shady LP was met with critical appraisal. Erlewine gave the album five stars out of five, praising the rapper's "expansive vocabulary and vivid imagination", adding that "Years later, as the shock has faded, it's those lyrical skills and the subtle mastery of the music that still resonate, and they're what make The Slim Shady LP one of the great debuts in both hip-hop and modern pop music". David Browne of Entertainment Weekly described the album's "unapologetic outrageousness" as a reaction to the "soul positivity" of conscious hip-hop, noting that "The Slim Shady LP marks the return of irreverent, wiseass attitude to the genre, heard throughout the album in its nonstop barrage of crudely funny rhymes ... Even pop fans deadened to graphic lyrics are likely to flinch." Soren Baker of the Los Angeles Times gave the album three and a half stars out of four and stated that "He isn't afraid to say anything; his lyrics are so clever that he makes murder sound as if it's a funny act he may indulge in simply to pass the time" but lamented the "sometimes flat production that takes away from the power of Eminem's verbal mayhem".

Many reviewers commented on The Slim Shady LP's lyrical content. Gilbert Rodman of Popular Communications states, "Eminem's music contains more than its fair share of misogynistic and homophobic lyrics, but simply to reduce it to these (as many critics do) doesn't help to explain Eminem. It merely invokes a platitude or a sound bite to explain him away." Rob Sheffield of Rolling Stone enjoyed the record's comedic nature, writing "Simply put: Eminem will crack you up", but also felt that the misogynistic lyrics grow tiresome, noting that "the wife-killing jokes of '97 Bonnie and Clyde' aren't any funnier than Garth Brooks', and 'My Fault' belongs on some sorry-ass Bloodhound Gang record." Nathan Rabin of The A.V. Club felt that although the album is "sophomoric and uninspired" at times, Eminem's "surreal, ultraviolent, trailer-trash/post-gangsta-rap extremism is at least a breath of fresh air in a rap world that's despairingly low on new ideas." Mike Rubin of Spin noted that "his scenarios are so far-fetched the songs almost never sound as ugly as they actually are." Chris Dafoe of The Globe and Mail opined that "Abused by fellow students and teachers, cheated on by his girlfriend, despised by society, Shady goes over the top now and then - or rather way over the top - but Dre's lean production, full of strange voice and comic interjections, hold things together." Reviewing for The Village Voice in 1999, Robert Christgau called the record a "platinum-bound cause celebre" and, despite succumbing to "dull sensationalism" toward the end, Eminem shows "more comic genius than any pop musician since", possibly, Loudon Wainwright III."

=== Accolades ===
At the 42nd Grammy Awards in 2000, The Slim Shady LP won Best Rap Album, while "My Name Is" won Best Rap Solo Performance. Rolling Stone ranked The Slim Shady LP number 275 on its list of The 500 Greatest Albums of All Time and 33 on its list of the "100 Best Albums of the '90s". In 2020, Rolling Stone ranked The Slim Shady LP as the 352nd greatest album of all time on their 500 Greatest Albums of All Time. NME ranked it number 248 in its list of The 500 Greatest Albums of All Time. Blender ranked it number 49 in its list of The 100 Greatest American Albums of All Time. "Ken Kaniff" was listed as number 15 on Complex's "50 Greatest Hip-Hop Skits" list, while the "Public Service Announcement" introduction to the album, along with the "Public Service Announcement 2000" introduction from The Marshall Mathers LP, was listed as number 50 on the list. Spin later included it in their list of "The 300 Best Albums of 1985–2014". It also won Outstanding National Album at the 2000 Detroit Music Awards. In 2015, it was ranked at number 76 by About.com in their list of "100 best hip-hop albums of all time". Christgau later named it among his 10 best albums from the 1990s. In 2022, Rolling Stone ranked The Slim Shady LP number 85 in their list of "The 200 Greatest Rap Albums of all time". In a 2024 ranking of Eminem's 12 studio albums, Damien Scott of Billboard magazine placed The Slim Shady LP second, writing: "Vacillating between improbable fantasy and stark realism, The Slim Shady LP gave glimpses of a gifted songwriter who studied the rap greats the way Kobe studied Jordan. The wild swings in emotion, sentiment and subject matter are startling." Scott highlighted the tracks "My Name Is", "'97 Bonnie & Clyde", and "Rock Bottom".

== Commercial performance ==
In the album's first week of release, The Slim Shady LP sold 283,000 copies, debuting at number two on the Billboard 200 chart behind TLC's FanMail. The record remained on the Billboard 200 for 100 weeks. It also reached number one on the R&B/Hip-Hop Albums chart, staying on the chart for 92 weeks. On April 5, 1999, The Slim Shady LP was certified platinum by the Recording Industry Association of America for sales of over one million copies. On November 15, 2000, the album was certified quadruple platinum by the RIAA. "My Name Is", the album's second single, peaked at number 36 on the Billboard Hot 100, remaining on the chart for ten weeks. The single additionally peaked at number 18 on the magazine's R&B/Hip-Hop Songs chart, 29 on the Pop Songs chart, and 37 on the Alternative Songs chart. "Guilty Conscience" reached number 56 on the Billboard R&B/Hip-Hop Songs chart, while "Just Don't Give a Fuck" peaked at number 62 on the chart (albeit in November 1998 due to its inclusion on The Slim Shady EP).

By November 2013, The Slim Shady LP sold 5,437,000 copies in the United States. on the weekly Canadian Albums Chart and remained on the chart for twelve weeks. Additionally, the album was certified triple platinum by the Canadian Recording Industry Association for shipments of over 200,000 units. The album was also certified double platinum in the United Kingdom, where it peaked at number ten on the UK Albums chart and remained on the chart for a total of 114 weeks. In Australia, the album peaked at number 49 on the ARIA Chart, and was eventually certified platinum in the country. The album had also peaked at the number 20 and 23 chart positions in the Netherlands and New Zealand, respectively. It was certified gold in the Netherlands and platinum in New Zealand.

== Legacy and aftermath ==
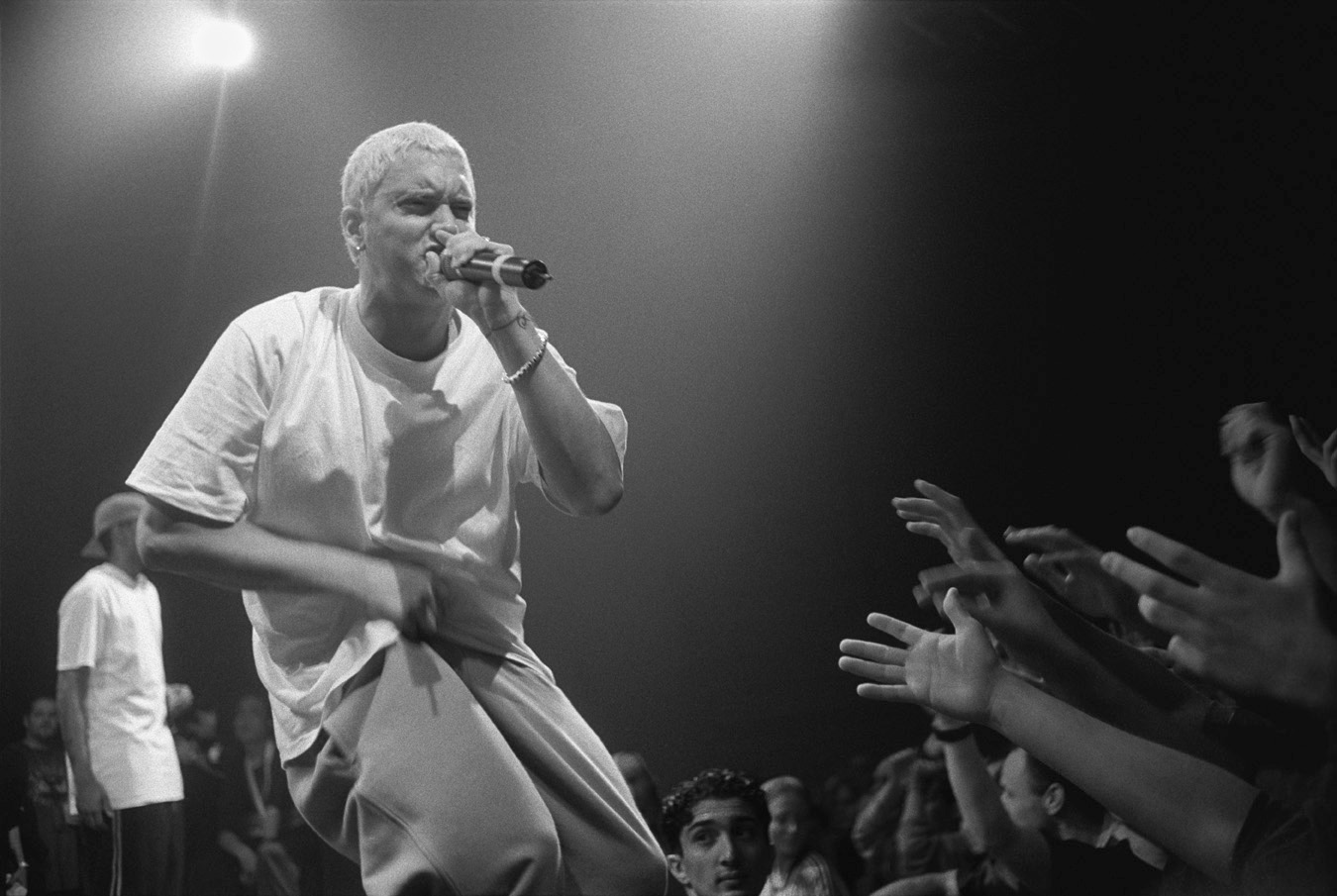
The album's success transformed Eminem (pictured in a concert in Munich, Germany in October 1999) into an international celebrity.

After the success of The Slim Shady LP, Eminem went from an underground rapper to a high-profile celebrity. Interscope Records awarded him with his independently-owned record label, called Shady Records, where the first artist Eminem signed was a rapper and his best friend Proof. Eminem, who had previously struggled to provide for his daughter, noted a drastic change in his lifestyle: "This last Christmas, there were so many fucking presents under the tree ... My daughter wasn't born with a silver spoon in her mouth. But she's got one now. I can't stop myself from spoiling her."

"Anybody who believes kids are naive enough to take this record literally is right to fear them, because that's the kind of adult teenagers hate. [This cause célèbre dares] moralizers to go on the attack while explicitly—but not (fuck you, dickwad) unambiguously—declaring itself a satiric, cautionary fiction".

— Christgau's Consumer Guide: Albums of the '90s (2000)

To promote The Slim Shady LP, Eminem embarked on an extensive tour schedule. He joined the Vans Warped Tour as a last-minute replacement for Cypress Hill, a schedule that included 31 North American dates from June 25 to July 31, beginning in San Antonio and ending in Miami. He often played a show in the afternoon on the Warped Tour, and then drove to another location to perform at a hip-hop club at night. During a performance in Hartford, Connecticut near the end of the Warped Tour, Eminem slipped on a puddle of liquid and fell ten feet down off the stage, cracking several ribs. He recalled that the stress of his newfound fame led him to drink excessively, and reflected, "I knew I had to slow it down. The fall was like a reminder." However, after receiving medical attention, he was well enough to travel to New York the following day for a performance on Total Request Live.

Eminem also became a highly controversial figure due to his lyrical content. He was labeled as "misogynist, a nihilist and an advocate of domestic violence", and in an editorial by Billboard editor in chief Timothy White, the writer accused Eminem of "making money by exploiting the world's misery." During a radio interview in San Francisco, Eminem reportedly angered local DJ Sista Tamu due to a freestyle about "slapping a pregnant bitch" to the extent that on air she broke a copy of The Slim Shady LP. The rapper defended himself by saying, "My album isn't for younger kids to hear. It has an advisory sticker, and you must be eighteen to get it. That doesn't mean younger kids won't get it, but I'm not responsible for every kid out there. I'm not a role model, and I don't claim to be."

== Lawsuits ==
On September 17, 1999, Eminem's mother, Debbie Mathers, filed a $10 million lawsuit against him for slander based on his claim that she uses drugs in the line "I just found out my mom does more dope than I do" from "My Name Is". After a two-year-long trial, she was awarded $25,000, of which she received $1,600 after legal fees. Eminem was not surprised that his mother had filed the lawsuit against him, referring to her as a "lawsuit queen", and alleging that "That's how she makes money. When I was five, she had a job on the cash register at a store that sold chips and soda. Other than that, I don't remember her working a day in her life." She later filed another lawsuit against him for emotional damages suffered during the first trial, which was later dismissed.

In December 2001, DeAngelo Bailey, a janitor living in Roseville, Michigan, who was made the subject of the song "Brain Damage" in which he is portrayed as a school bully, filed a $1 million lawsuit against Eminem for slander and invasion of privacy. Bailey's attorney stated "Eminem is a Caucasian male who faced criticism within the music industry that he had not suffered through difficult circumstances growing up and he was therefore a 'pretender' in the industry ... Eminem used Bailey, his African-American childhood schoolmate, as a pawn in his effort to stem the tide of criticism." In 1982, Debbie Mathers unsuccessfully sued the Roseville school district for not protecting her son, as she claimed that attacks from bullies caused him headaches, nausea, and antisocial behavior. Additionally, Bailey had previously admitted to bullying Eminem in the April 1999 issue of Rolling Stone Magazine. The lawsuit was dismissed by judge Deborah Servitto in 2003, who wrote her ruling in the form of rap-like rhyme. She ruled that the lyrics—which include the school principal collaborating with Bailey, and Eminem's entire brain falling out of his head—were too exaggerated for a listener to believe that they were recalling an actual event. The verdict was upheld in 2005, and Bailey's lawyer ruled out any further appeals.

In September 2003, 70-year-old widow Harlene Stein filed suit against Eminem and Dr. Dre on the grounds that "Guilty Conscience" contains an unauthorized sample of "Go Home Pigs" composed for the film Getting Straight by her husband, Ronald Stein, who died in 1988. Although the album's liner notes state that the song contains an interpolation of "Go Home Pigs", Stein is not credited as a composer and his wife was not paid royalties for use of the song. The lawsuit requested for 5 percent of the retail list price of 90 percent all of the copies of the record sold in America, and 2.5 percent of the retail price of 90 percent of the copies of the album sold internationally. The suit was dismissed in June 2004 for lack of subject matter jurisdiction.

== Track listing ==
All tracks are written by Marshall Mathers and the Bass Brothers (Mark Bass and Jeff Bass), except where noted.

No.	Title	Writer(s)	Producer(s)	Length
1.	"Public Service Announcement"			0:33
2.	"My Name Is"	Mathers; Andre Young; Labi Siffre	Dr. Dre	4:28
3.	"Guilty Conscience" (featuring Dr. Dre)	Mathers; Young	Dr. Dre; Eminem	3:19
4.	"Brain Damage"		Bass Brothers; Eminem^{[a]}	3:46
5.	"Paul (skit)"			0:15
6.	"If I Had"		Bass Brothers; Eminem^{[a]}; DJ Rec^{[b]}	4:05
7.	"'97 Bonnie & Clyde"		Bass Brothers; Eminem^{[a]}; DJ Head^{[b]}	5:16
8.	"Bitch (skit)"			0:19
9.	"Role Model"	Mathers; Young; Melvin Bradford	Dr. Dre; Mel-Man	3:25
10.	"Lounge (skit)"			0:46
11.	"My Fault"		Bass Brothers; Eminem	4:01
12.	"Ken Kaniff (skit)"			1:16
13.	"Cum on Everybody" (featuring Dina Rae)		Bass Brothers; Eminem^{[a]}	3:39
14.	"Rock Bottom"		Bass Brothers	3:34
15.	"Just Don't Give a Fuck"		Bass Brothers; Eminem^{[a]}; Denaun Porter^{[b]}	4:02
16.	"Soap (skit)"			0:34
17.	"As the World Turns"		Bass Brothers; Eminem^{[a]}; Justin Trugman^{[b]}	4:25
18.	"I'm Shady"		Bass Brothers; Eminem^{[a]}	3:31
19.	"Bad Meets Evil" (featuring Royce da 5'9")	Mathers; Ryan Montgomery; Jeff Bass; Mark Bass	Bass Brothers; Eminem^{[a]}	4:13
20.	"Still Don't Give a Fuck"		Bass Brothers; Eminem^{[a]}	4:12
Total length:				59:39

The Slim Shady LP: Special Edition Bonus Disc
No.	Title	Length
1.	"Hazardous Youth (acapella version)"	0:47
2.	"Get You Mad"	4:21
3.	"Greg (acapella version)"	0:53
4.	"Just Don't Give a Fuck (music video)"
5.	"My Name Is (music video)"
6.	"Guilty Conscience (music video)"
7.	"Role Model (music video)"
8.	"The Slim Shady LP (Live & Studio Footage)"

The Slim Shady LP: Expanded Edition bonus tracks
No.	Title	Length
21.	"Hazardous Youth (acapella version)"	0:44
22.	"Get You Mad" (with Sway and King Tech & DJ Revolution)	4:22
23.	"Greg (acapella version)"	0:52
24.	"Bad Guys Always Die" (with Dr. Dre)	4:39
25.	"Guilty Conscience (radio version)" (featuring Dr. Dre)	3:19
26.	"Guilty Conscience (Instrumental)" (featuring Dr. Dre)	3:20
27.	"Guilty Conscience (acapella version)" (featuring Dr. Dre)	3:16
28.	"My Name Is (Instrumental)"	4:29
29.	"Just Don't Give a Fuck (acapella version)"	3:35
30.	"Just Don't Give a Fuck (Instrumental)"	4:08
Total length:		36:00

Notes

- ^{^[a]} signifies a co-producer.
- ^{^[b]} signifies a pre-production.
- On the clean version of the album, "Bitch", "Cum on Everybody", "Just Don't Give a Fuck", and "Still Don't Give a Fuck" are respectively retitled "Zoe", "Come on Everybody", "Just Don't Give", and "Still Don't Give".
- Some online platforms (such as Myspace) include an alternate clean version of the album which completely removes the song "Guilty Conscience".

== Personnel ==
- Jeff Bass – writer, producer
- Mark Bass – writer, producer
- Melvin Bradford – writer, producer on "Role Model"
- Marshall Mathers – writer, producer, artist
- Denaun Porter – producer on "Just Don't Give a Fuck"
- Dina Rae – artist on "Cum On Everybody"
- Andre Young – writer, producer, drum programming

== Charts ==
=== Weekly charts ===
Chart (1999)	Peak position
Australian Albums (ARIA)	49
Australian Urban Albums (ARIA)	7
Austrian Albums (Ö3 Austria)	12
Belgian Albums (Ultratop Flanders)	46
Belgian Albums (Ultratop Flanders) Special Edition	7
Belgian Albums (Ultratop Wallonia)	157
Belgian Albums (Ultratop Wallonia) Special Edition	27
Canadian Albums (Billboard)	9
Canadian R&B Albums (Nielsen SoundScan)	7
Dutch Albums (Album Top 100)	20
French Albums (SNEP)	52
German Albums (Offizielle Top 100)	51
Irish Albums (IRMA)	22
Japanese Albums (Oricon)	39
New Zealand Albums (RMNZ)	23
Norwegian Albums (VG-lista)	25
Swedish Albums (Sverigetopplistan)	40
Swiss Albums (Schweizer Hitparade)	77
Swiss Albums (Schweizer Hitparade) Special Edition	25
UK Albums (Official Charts)	10
UK R&B Albums (Official Charts)	1
US Billboard 200	2
US Top R&B/Hip-Hop Albums (Billboard)	1
Chart (2002)	Peak position
US Top Catalog Albums (Billboard)	3

=== Year-end charts ===
Chart (1999)	Position
Canadian Albums (RPM)	69
UK Albums (OC)	64
US Billboard 200	22
US Top R&B/Hip-Hop Albums (Billboard)	13

Chart (2000)	Position
Canadian Albums (Nielsen SoundScan)	95
UK Albums (OC)	44
US Billboard 200	54
US Top R&B/Hip-Hop Albums (Billboard)	64

Chart (2001)	Position
Belgian Albums (Ultratop Flanders) Special Edition	56
Canadian R&B Albums (Nielsen SoundScan)	73
Canadian Rap Albums (Nielsen SoundScan)	36
UK Albums (OCC)	84

Chart (2002)	Position
Canadian Alternative Albums (Nielsen SoundScan)	127

== Certifications and sales ==
Region	Certification	Certified units/sales
Australia (ARIA)	8× Platinum	560,000^{‡}
Canada (Music Canada)	2× Platinum	200,000^{^}
Italy (FIMI) Sales since 2009	Gold	25,000^{‡}
Netherlands (NVPI)	Gold	50,000^{^}
New Zealand (RMNZ)	2× Platinum	30,000^{‡}
South Africa (RISA)	Gold	25,000^{*}
Switzerland (IFPI Switzerland)	Gold	25,000^{^}
United Kingdom (BPI)	4× Platinum	1,200,000^{‡}
United States (RIAA)	6× Platinum	6,597,000
Summaries
Europe (IFPI)	Platinum	1,000,000^{*}
^{*} Sales figures based on certification alone.^{^} Shipments figures based on certification alone.^{‡} Sales+streaming figures based on certification alone.

== See also ==
- Grammy Award for Best Rap Album
- List of number-one R&B albums of 1999 (U.S.)
