= Rap Olympics =

Rap competition

The Rap Olympics is a showcase/free-style rap event which was first created in March 1994, in East Orange, New Jersey by Gregory W. Thomas of Nubian Recordings which consisted of a three state competition: PA, NJ and NY.

== History ==
The Original Rap Olympics Showcase was held at Midnight in Club Zanzibar aka Brick City of Newark NJ on May 27th 1994.

A different version was first held October 24, 1997, in Los Angeles near LAX airport. The winner of the event would receive $500 and a Rolex watch. In 1997, the rapper Otherwize won, with Eminem coming in second place. Although Eminem lost the battle, an impressed Interscope Records intern in attendance called Dean Geistlinger asked Eminem for a copy of the Slim Shady EP, which was then sent to company CEO Jimmy Iovine who then played it for Dr. Dre, which ultimately resulted in him signing Eminem to Dre's record label, Aftermath.

The Rap Olympics were revived in 2007.
