= Dr. Dre discography =

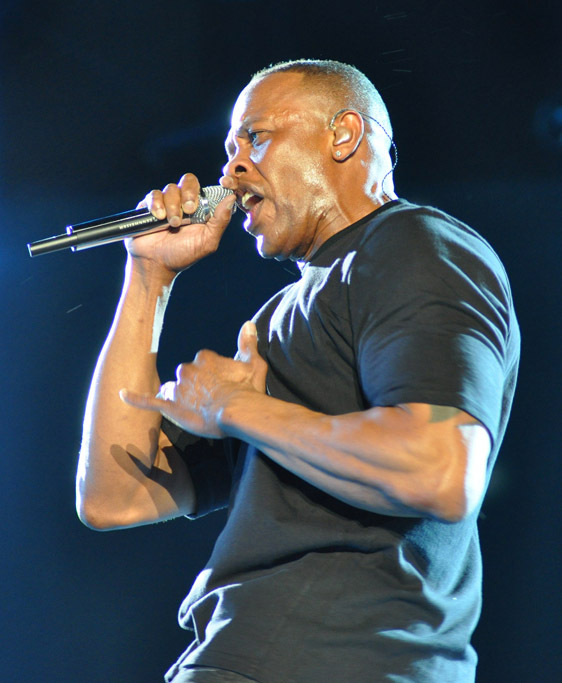
- Dr. Dre performing in 2012
- Studio albums: 3
- Soundtrack albums: 1
- Compilation albums: 2
- Singles: 42
- Music videos: 21

The discography of American record producer, sound engineer, and rapper Dr. Dre consists of three studio albums, forty-two singles, (including twenty-four as a featured artist), two compilation albums, one soundtrack album, and twenty-one music videos.

Dr. Dre began his rap career in the World Class Wreckin' Cru in the mid-1980s and performed with the group N.W.A from 1987 to 1991. In 1992, Dr. Dre launched his solo career with the collaborative single with Snoop Dogg "Deep Cover" and the album The Chronic under Death Row Records. The Chronic was certified triple platinum in the United States. Its singles "Nuthin' but a 'G' Thang" and "Fuck wit Dre Day (And Everybody's Celebratin')" both made the top ten spots of the American Billboard Hot 100 chart; "Let Me Ride" reached number three on the Hot Rap Tracks chart. Dr. Dre also began his career as a record producer, with his first productions including Snoop Dogg's 1993 debut album Doggystyle and the soundtrack to the film Above the Rim. He performed in guest spots for other artists in Ice Cube's "Natural Born Killaz" and 2Pac's "California Love". Dr. Dre's 1995 single "Keep Their Heads Ringin'" was another top ten hit and was featured in the soundtrack to the film Friday. In 1996, Dr. Dre left Death Row to form his own record label Aftermath Entertainment and released a compilation Dr. Dre Presents the Aftermath with his single "Been There, Done That" and other tracks from artists newly signed to Aftermath.

In 1999, Dr. Dre released his second studio album 2001. This album went six times platinum in the US and five times platinum in Canada (500,000 units). Singles "Forgot About Dre" and "The Next Episode" reached the top ten spots of the Hot Rap Tracks chart. As the founder and CEO of Aftermath Entertainment, Dr. Dre focused on producing for other artists during the 2000s and appeared on singles by Eminem, including "Encore" in 2004 and "Crack a Bottle" in 2009. Dr. Dre began recording his cancelled album Detox in 2003, and intended it to be his final album. Dr. Dre also revealed a multi-year production pact with New Line Cinema in 2007. He was to join Phillip G. Atwell in scoring and possibly directing movies.

In 2014, Aftermath producer Dawaun Parker revealed that Dr. Dre was working on a new album, but that it would not be titled Detox and he had scrapped that title "a couple [of] years ago". The album's title was eventually announced as Compton, and acts as the soundtrack to the N.W.A biographical film Straight Outta Compton. The album debuted at number two on the Billboard Top 200, and number one in the United Kingdom, Canada, Australia, Ireland, New Zealand, Belgium, France, the Netherlands and Switzerland.

== Albums ==
=== Studio albums ===
List of studio albums, with selected chart positions, sales figures and certifications
| Title | Album details | Peak chart positions | | | | | | | | | | | Sales | Certifications (sales threshold) |
| Title | Album details | US | US R&B | AUS | CAN | FRA | GER | IRE | NL | NZ | SWI | UK | Sales | Certifications (sales threshold) |
|---|---|---|---|---|---|---|---|---|---|---|---|---|---|---|
| The Chronic | Released: December 15, 1992; Label: Death Row, Interscope, Priority; Format: CD, LP, cassette, digital download | 3 | 1 | 91 | — | — | 35 | 48 | — | — | 32 | 43 | US: 5,800,000; UK: 260,814 | RIAA: 3× Platinum; BPI: Platinum |
| 2001 | Released: November 16, 1999; Label: Aftermath, Interscope; Format: CD, LP, cassette, digital download | 2 | 1 | 26 | 2 | 15 | 20 | 7 | 17 | 11 | 26 | 4 | US: 7,900,000; UK: 1,377,672 | RIAA: 6× Platinum; ARIA: 4× Platinum; BPI: 5× Platinum; BVMI: Gold; IFPI SWI: Gold; MC: 5× Platinum; RMNZ: 6× Platinum; SNEP: Gold |
| Compton | Released: August 7, 2015; Label: Aftermath, Interscope; Format: CD, LP, digital download | 2 | 1 | 1 | 1 | 1 | 4 | 1 | 1 | 1 | 1 | 1 | US: 560,000; UK: 137,534 | RIAA: Gold; ARIA: Gold; BPI: Gold; RMNZ: Gold; SNEP: Gold |
"—" denotes a recording that did not chart or was not released in that territory.

=== Collaborative albums ===
List of collaborative albums, with selected chart positions and certifications
| Title | Album details | Peak chart positions | | | | | | Certifications |
| Title | Album details | US | US R&B | CAN | GER | SWI | UK | Certifications |
|---|---|---|---|---|---|---|---|---|
| World Class (with World Class Wreckin' Cru) | Released: April 20, 1985; Label: Kru-Cut; Format: CD, LP, cassette | — | — | — | — | — | — | |
| Rapped in Romance (with World Class Wreckin' Cru) | Released: May 9, 1986; Label: Epic; Format: CD, LP, cassette | — | — | — | — | — | — | |
| Straight Outta Compton (with N.W.A) | Released: August 8, 1988; Label: Ruthless, Priority; Format: CD, LP, cassette | 4 | 9 | — | — | — | — | RIAA: 3× Platinum |
| 100 Miles and Runnin' (with N.W.A) | Released: August 14, 1990; Label: Ruthless, Priority; Format: CD, LP, cassette | 27 | 10 | — | — | — | — | RIAA: Platinum |
| Niggaz4Life (with N.W.A) | Released: May 28, 1991; Label: Ruthless, Priority; Format: CD, LP, cassette | 1 | 1 | — | — | — | — | RIAA: Platinum |
| Missionary (with Snoop Dogg) | Released: December 13, 2024; Label: Death Row, Aftermath, Interscope; Format: CD, LP, digital download | 20 | 7 | 34 | 7 | 4 | 24 | |

=== Compilation albums ===
List of compilation albums, with selected chart positions and certifications
| Title | Album details | Peak chart positions | | | Certifications |
| Title | Album details | US | US R&B | CAN | Certifications |
|---|---|---|---|---|---|
| Concrete Roots | Released: September 20, 1994; Label: Triple X, Hitman Music; Format: CD, LP, cassette | 43 | 17 | — | |
| First Round Knock Out | Released: May 21, 1996; Label: Triple X; Format: CD, cassette | 52 | 18 | — | |
| Dr. Dre Presents: The Aftermath | Released: November 26, 1996; Label: Aftermath, Interscope; Format: CD, LP, cassette, digital download | 6 | 3 | 69 | RIAA: Platinum |

=== Soundtrack albums ===
List of soundtrack albums, with selected chart positions and certifications
| Title | Album details | Peak chart positions | | | | | | Certifications |
| Title | Album details | US | US R&B | CAN | FRA | GER | NL | Certifications |
|---|---|---|---|---|---|---|---|---|
| The Wash | Released: November 6, 2001; Label: Aftermath, Interscope; Format: CD, digital download | 19 | 5 | 9 | 21 | 20 | 15 | RIAA: Gold |

== Extended plays ==
| Title | EP details |
|---|---|
| GTA Online: The Contract | Released: February 4, 2022; Label: Aftermath, Interscope; Format: Digital download, streaming |

== Singles ==
=== As lead artist ===
List of singles as lead artist, with selected chart positions and certifications, showing year released and album name
| Title | Year | Peak chart positions | | | | | | | | | | Certifications | Album |
| Title | Year | US | US R&B | US Rap | FRA | GER | IRE | NL | NZ | SWI | UK | Certifications | Album |
|---|---|---|---|---|---|---|---|---|---|---|---|---|---|
| "Deep Cover" (featuring Snoop Doggy Dogg) | 1992 | — | 46 | 4 | — | — | — | — | — | — | — | | Deep Cover (soundtrack) |
| "Nuthin' but a 'G' Thang" (featuring Snoop Doggy Dogg) | 1993 | 2 | 1 | 1 | — | — | — | — | 39 | — | 31 | RIAA: Platinum; BPI: Gold; RMNZ: 3× Platinum | The Chronic |
| "Fuck wit Dre Day (And Everybody's Celebratin')" (featuring Snoop Doggy Dogg) | 1993 | 8 | 6 | 13 | — | — | — | — | 49 | — | 59 | RIAA: Gold | The Chronic |
| "Let Me Ride" | 1993 | 34 | 34 | 3 | — | — | — | — | — | — | 31 | | The Chronic |
| "Natural Born Killaz" (with Ice Cube) | 1994 | — | — | — | — | — | — | — | — | — | 45 | | Murder Was the Case (soundtrack) |
| "Keep Their Heads Ringin'" | 1995 | 10 | 10 | 1 | 29 | 23 | — | 15 | 3 | 7 | 25 | RIAA: Gold; BPI: Silver; RMNZ: 2× Platinum | Friday (soundtrack) |
| "Been There, Done That" | 1996 | — | — | — | — | — | — | — | 31 | — | — | | Dr. Dre Presents the Aftermath |
| "Zoom" (with LL Cool J) | 1998 | — | — | — | — | 44 | — | 67 | — | 45 | 15 | | Bulworth (soundtrack) |
| "Still D.R.E." (featuring Snoop Dogg) | 1999 | 23 | 6 | 5 | 29 | 38 | 14 | 16 | 21 | 15 | 6 | BPI: 2× Platinum; BVMI: 3× Gold; RMNZ: 7× Platinum | 2001 |
| "Forgot About Dre" (featuring Eminem) | 2000 | 25 | 14 | — | — | 41 | 20 | 16 | 26 | 37 | 7 | BPI: 3× Platinum; RMNZ: 6× Platinum | 2001 |
| "The Next Episode" (featuring Snoop Dogg, Kurupt and Nate Dogg) | 2000 | 23 | 11 | 9 | 22 | 34 | 11 | 26 | — | 34 | 3 | BPI: 2× Platinum; BVMI: Gold; RMNZ: 4× Platinum | 2001 |
| "The Watcher" | 2001 | — | — | — | 47 | — | — | — | — | — | — | RMNZ: Platinum | 2001 |
| "Put It on Me" (with DJ Quik) | 2001 | — | — | — | — | — | — | — | — | — | — | | Training Day (soundtrack) and Under tha Influence |
| "The Wash" (featuring Snoop Dogg) | 2001 | — | 43 | — | 58 | — | — | — | — | — | — | | The Wash (soundtrack) |
| "Bad Intentions" (featuring Knoc-Turn'al) | 2001 | — | 33 | — | 45 | 75 | 8 | 26 | — | 47 | 4 | | The Wash (soundtrack) |
| "Kush" (featuring Snoop Dogg and Akon) | 2010 | 34 | 43 | 11 | 46 | — | — | — | — | 59 | 57 | RMNZ: Gold | Detox (unreleased) |
| "I Need a Doctor" (featuring Eminem and Skylar Grey) | 2011 | 4 | — | 16 | 29 | 25 | 11 | 55 | 23 | 33 | 8 | RIAA: 2× Platinum; ARIA: 4× Platinum; BPI: Platinum; RMNZ: Platinum | Detox (unreleased) |
| "Talking to My Diary" | 2015 | — | — | — | 78 | — | — | — | — | — | — | | Compton |
| "Talk About It" (featuring King Mez and Justus) | 2015 | — | 45 | — | 95 | — | — | — | — | — | — | | Compton |
"—" denotes a recording that did not chart or was not released in that territory.

=== As featured artist ===
List of singles as featured artist, with selected chart positions and certifications, showing year released and album name
| Title | Year | Peak chart positions | | | | | | | | | | Certifications | Album |
| Title | Year | US | US R&B | US Rap | FRA | GER | IRE | NL | NZ | SWI | UK | Certifications | Album |
|---|---|---|---|---|---|---|---|---|---|---|---|---|---|
| "We Want Eazy" (Eazy-E featuring Dr. Dre and MC Ren) | 1989 | — | 43 | 7 | — | — | — | — | — | — | — | | Eazy-Duz-It |
| "No More Lies" (Michel'le featuring Dr. Dre) (uncredited) | 1989 | 7 | 2 | — | — | — | — | — | — | — | 78 | | Michel'le |
| "Nicety" (Michel'le featuring Dr. Dre) | 1989 | | | | | | | | | | | | Michel'le |
| "We're All in the Same Gang" (with The West Coast Rap All-Stars) | 1990 | 35 | 10 | 1 | — | — | — | — | — | — | — | RIAA: Gold | We're All in the Same Gang |
| "Funky Flute" (Jimmy Z featuring Dr. Dre) | 1991 | — | — | — | — | — | — | — | — | — | — | | Muzical Madness |
| "U Better Recognize" (Sam Sneed featuring Dr. Dre) | 1994 | — | 48 | 18 | — | — | — | — | — | — | — | | Murder Was the Case (soundtrack) |
| "California Love" (2Pac featuring Dr. Dre and Roger Troutman) | 1996 | 1 | 1 | 1 | 13 | 7 | 16 | 7 | 1 | 7 | 6 | RIAA: 2× Platinum; BPI: 2× Platinum; BVMI: Gold | Non-album single |
| "No Diggity" (Blackstreet featuring Dr. Dre and Queen Pen) | 1996 | 1 | 1 | — | 25 | 14 | 10 | 7 | 1 | 11 | 9 | RIAA: Platinum; BPI: 4× Platinum; RMNZ: 6× Platinum | Another Level |
| "Phone Tap" (The Firm featuring Dr. Dre) | 1997 | — | — | — | — | — | — | — | — | — | — | | The Album |
| "Puppet Master" (DJ Muggs featuring B-Real and Dr. Dre) | 1997 | — | 73 | — | — | — | — | — | — | — | — | | Chapter 1 |
| "Game Over" (Scarface featuring Dr. Dre, Ice Cube and Too $hort) | 1997 | — | — | — | — | — | — | — | — | — | — | | The Untouchable |
| "Ghetto Fabulous" (Ras Kass featuring Dr. Dre and Mack 10) | 1998 | — | 56 | — | — | — | — | — | — | — | — | | Rasassination |
| "Guilty Conscience" (Eminem featuring Dr. Dre) | 1999 | — | 56 | — | 97 | 40 | 12 | 22 | — | — | 5 | RIAA: Gold; ARIA: Platinum; BPI: Platinum; RMNZ: Platinum | The Slim Shady LP |
| "Hello" (Ice Cube featuring Dr. Dre and MC Ren) | 2000 | — | 50 | — | — | — | — | — | — | — | — | | War & Peace Vol. 2 (The Peace Disc) |
| "Bitch Please II" (Eminem featuring Dr. Dre, Nate Dogg, Snoop Dogg and Xzibit) | 2000 | — | 61 | — | — | — | — | — | — | — | — | RIAA: Gold; ARIA: Platinum; RMNZ: Platinum | The Marshall Mathers LP |
| "Ain't Nuttin' but Music" (D12 featuring Dr. Dre) | 2001 | — | — | — | 25 | — | — | — | — | — | — | | Devil's Night |
| "Fast Lane" (Bilal featuring Dr. Dre and Jadakiss) | 2001 | — | 41 | — | — | — | — | — | — | — | — | | 1st Born Second |
| "The Knoc" (Knoc-Turn'al featuring Dr. Dre and Missy Elliott) | 2002 | 98 | 67 | 13 | — | — | — | — | — | — | — | | L.A. Confidential presents: Knoc-turn'al |
| "Symphony in X Major" (Xzibit featuring Dr. Dre) | 2002 | — | 63 | — | — | — | — | — | — | — | — | | Man vs. Machine |
| "Encore" (Eminem featuring Dr. Dre and 50 Cent) | 2004 | 25 | 48 | 20 | — | — | — | — | — | — | 116 | | Encore |
| "Crack a Bottle" (Eminem featuring Dr. Dre and 50 Cent) | 2009 | 1 | 60 | 4 | — | — | 6 | 56 | 6 | 4 | 4 | RIAA: 2× Platinum; ARIA: 2× Platinum; BPI: Gold; RMNZ: Platinum | Relapse |
| "Old Time's Sake" (Eminem featuring Dr. Dre) | 2009 | 25 | — | — | — | — | 49 | — | — | — | 61 | | Relapse |
| "Hell Breaks Loose" (Eminem featuring Dr. Dre) | 2009 | 29 | — | — | — | — | — | — | — | — | — | | Relapse: Refill |
| "The Recipe" (Kendrick Lamar featuring Dr. Dre) | 2012 | — | 38 | 23 | — | — | — | — | — | — | — | RIAA: Platinum; ARIA: Gold; BPI: Silver; RMNZ: Platinum | Good Kid, M.A.A.D City |
| "New Day" (50 Cent featuring Dr. Dre and Alicia Keys) | 2012 | 79 | 43 | 18 | 109 | 53 | — | 92 | — | — | — | | Street King Immortal (scrapped) |
"—" denotes a recording that did not chart or was not released in that territory.

== Other charted and certified songs ==
List of songs, with selected chart positions and certifications, showing year released and album name
| Title | Year | Peak chart positions | | | Certifications | Album |
| Title | Year | US R&B | AUS | UK | Certifications | Album |
|---|---|---|---|---|---|---|
| "Fuck You" (featuring Snoop Dogg and Devin the Dude) | 1999 | 61 | — | — | RMNZ: Platinum | 2001 |
| "Let's Get High" (featuring Kurupt, Hittman and Ms. Roq) | 1999 | 72 | — | — | | 2001 |
| "Xxplosive" (featuring Hittman, Kurupt, Nate Dogg and Six-Two) | 1999 | 51 | — | — | BPI: Silver; RMNZ: 2× Platinum | 2001 |
| "What's the Difference" (featuring Xzibit and Eminem) | 1999 | 76 | — | — | BPI: Gold; RMNZ: 2× Platinum | 2001 |
| "Bang Bang" (featuring Hittman and Knoc-Turn’al) | 1999 | — | — | — | RMNZ: Gold | 2001 |
| "Put It on Me" (with DJ Quik, featuring Mimi) | 2001 | 62 | — | — | | Training Day soundtrack |
| "Bounce" (Timbaland featuring Dr. Dre, Missy Elliott and Justin Timberlake) | 2008 | — | — | 176 | | Shock Value |
| "Popped Off" (T.I. featuring Dr. Dre) | 2012 | 75 | — | — | | Fuck da City Up |
| "Compton" (Kendrick Lamar featuring Dr. Dre) | 2012 | 52 | — | — | | Good Kid, M.A.A.D City |
| "Deep Water" (featuring Kendrick Lamar, Justus & Anderson .Paak) | 2015 | — (Note: "Deep Water" did not enter the Hot R&B/Hip-Hop Songs chart, but peaked at number 6 on the Bubbling Under R&B/Hip-Hop Singles chart, which acts as an extension to the Hot R&B/Hip-Hop Songs chart.) | — | — | | Compton |
| "Genocide" (featuring Kendrick Lamar, Marsha Ambrosius & Candice Pillay) | 2015 | — (Note: "Genocide" did not enter the Hot R&B/Hip-Hop Songs chart, but peaked at number 2 on the Bubbling Under R&B/Hip-Hop Singles chart, which acts as an extension to the Hot R&B/Hip-Hop Songs chart.) | — | — | | Compton |
| "Medicine Man" (featuring Eminem, Candice Pillay and Anderson .Paak) | 2015 | 40 | — | — | | Compton |
"—" denotes a recording that did not chart or was not released in that territory.

=== Guest appearances ===
List of non-single guest appearances, with other performing artists, showing year released and album name
| Title | Year | Other performer(s) | Album |
|---|---|---|---|
| "Grand Finale" | 1989 | The D.O.C., N.W.A. | No One Can Do It Better |
| "Tha Last Song" | 1990 | Above the Law, N.W.A. | Livin' Like Hustlers |
| "Paint the White House Black" | 1993 | George Clinton, Ice Cube, Public Enemy, Yo-Yo, MC Breed, Chuck D, Kam | Hey, Man, Smell My Finger |
| "G Funk Intro" {background vocals} | 1993 | Snoop Doggy Dogg, George Clinton, The Lady of Rage | Doggystyle |
| "Afro Puffs (Extended version)" {background vocals} | 1994 | The Lady of Rage | Above the Rim - The Soundtrack |
| "187 Um" {alternate version of "Deep Cover"} | 1995 | Snoop Dogg | One Million Strong |
| "Respect" {background vocals} | 1995 | Tha Dogg Pound | Dogg Food |
| "Let's Play House" {background vocals} | 1995 | Tha Dogg Pound, Michel'le, Nate Dogg | Dogg Food |
| "California Love" (Remix) | 1996 | 2Pac, Roger Troutman | All Eyez on Me |
| "Nas Is Coming" {background vocals} | 1996 | Nas | It Was Written |
| "Cutaluff" | 1997 | Ant Banks, Slink Capone | Big Thangs |
| "Firm Family" | 1997 | The Firm | The Album (The Firm Album) |
| "Money" | 1998 | King T | The Kingdom Come (Released 2002) |
| "The Chron" | 1998 | King T | The Kingdom Come (Released 2002) |
| "Where's T" | 1998 | King T | The Kingdom Come (Released 2002) |
| "Ask Yourself a Question" | 1998 | Kurupt | Kuruption! |
| "Just Dippin'" | 1999 | Snoop Dogg, Jewell | No Limit Top Dogg |
| "Watch Me" | 1999 | Jay-Z | Vol. 3... Life and Times of S. Carter |
| "If I Get Locked Up Tonight" | 1999 | Funkmaster Flex, Eminem | The Tunnel |
| "Ho's a Housewife" | 1999 | Kurupt, Hittman | Tha Streetz Iz a Mutha |
| "Even Deeper" | 1999 | Nine Inch Nails | The Fragile |
| "Intro to Indo" | 2000 | Tha Eastsidaz | Tha Eastsidaz |
| "U Know" | 2000 | Xzibit | Restless |
| "Intro" | 2000 | Funkmaster Flex | The Mix Tape, Vol. IV |
| "Your Wife" | 2001 | Nate Dogg | Music and Me |
| "On the Boulevard" | 2001 | Snoop Dogg | The Wash (soundtrack) |
| "That's Me" {Unreleased} | 2001 | Shaquille O'Neal | Shaquille O'Neal Presents His Superfriends, Vol. 1 |
| "Push Play" | 2002 | Truth Hurts | Truthfully Speaking |
| "Hollywood" | 2002 | Truth Hurts | Truthfully Speaking |
| "Say What You Say" | 2002 | Eminem | The Eminem Show |
| "The Watcher 2" | 2002 | Jay-Z, Rakim, Truth Hurts | The Blueprint 2: The Gift & the Curse |
| "Shit Hits the Fan" | 2003 | Obie Trice, Eminem | Cheers |
| "Psychic Pymp Hotline" | 2003 | The D.O.C., Mike Lynn | Deuce |
| "Gorilla Pympin" | 2003 | The D.O.C., Six-Two | Deuce |
| "Judgment Day" | 2003 | The D.O.C., Six-Two | Deuce |
| "Imagine" | 2006 | Snoop Dogg, D'Angelo | Tha Blue Carpet Treatment |
| "Syllables" {Unreleased} | 2007 | Eminem, Jay-Z, 50 Cent, Stat Quo, Cashis | —N/a |
| "Come and Go" | 2007 | 50 Cent | Curtis |
| "Bounce" | 2007 | Timbaland, Missy Elliott, Justin Timberlake | Shock Value |
| "Set It Off (Remix)" | 2008 | Kardinal Offishal, Pusha T | —N/a |
| "Drug Test" | 2011 | The Game, Snoop Dogg | The R.E.D. Album |
| "Back Against the Wall" | 2011 | Slim the Mobster, Sly | War Music |
| "Popped Off" | 2012 | T.I. | Fuck da City Up |
| "3 Kings" | 2012 | Rick Ross, Jay-Z | God Forgives, I Don't |
| "Compton" | 2012 | Kendrick Lamar | Good Kid, M.A.A.D City |
| "Stronger" | 2014 | Marsha Ambrosius | Friends & Lovers |
| "Don't Trip" | 2015 | The Game, Ice Cube, will.i.am | The Documentary 2 |
| "Mansa Musa" | 2018 | Anderson .Paak, Cocoa Sarai | Oxnard |
| "Gunz Blazing" | 2020 | Eminem, Sly Pyper | Music to Be Murdered By |
| "Full Circle" (uncredited) | 2020 | Nas | King's Disease (uncredited) |
| "Outta da Blue" | 2024 | Snoop Dogg, Alus | Missionary |
| "Pressure" | 2024 | Snoop Dogg, K.A.A.N. | Missionary |
| "Now or Never" | 2024 | Snoop Dogg, BJ the Chicago Kid | Missionary |
| "Leave Me Alone" | 2025 | Xzibit, Ty Dolla $ign | Kingmaker |

== Music videos ==
| Year | Title | Director | Artist(s) |
As main performer
| 1992 | "Deep Cover" | | with Snoop Doggy Dogg |
| 1992 | "Nuthin' but a 'G' Thang" | Dr. Dre | featuring Snoop Doggy Dogg |
| 1993 | "Fuck wit Dre Day (And Everybody's Celebratin')" | | featuring Snoop Doggy Dogg |
| 1993 | "Let Me Ride" | Dr. Dre | featuring Jewell and Snoop Doggy Dogg |
| 1993 | "Lil' Ghetto Boy" | Dr. Dre | featuring Snoop Doggy Dogg |
| 1994 | "Natural Born Killaz" | | with Ice Cube |
| 1995 | "Keep Their Heads Ringin'" | F. Gary Gray | —N/a |
| 1996 | "Been There, Done That" | | —N/a |
| 1998 | "Zoom" | | with LL Cool J |
| 1999 | "Still D.R.E." | Hype Williams | featuring Snoop Dogg |
| 2000 | "Forgot About Dre" | Phillip G. Atwell | featuring Eminem |
| 2000 | "The Next Episode" | | featuring Snoop Dogg |
| 2002 | "Bad Intentions" | | featuring Knoc-turn'al |
| 2010 | "Kush" | Joseph Kahn | featuring Snoop Dogg and Akon |
| 2011 | "I Need a Doctor" | Allen Hughes | featuring Eminem and Skylar Grey |
As featured performer
| 1989 | "No More Lies" | Jane Simpson | Michel'le featuring Dr. Dre |
| 1995 | "California Love" | Hype Williams | 2Pac featuring Dr. Dre |
| 1996 | "No Diggity" | Hype Williams | Blackstreet featuring Dr. Dre and Queen Pen |
| 1999 | "Guilty Conscience" | Phillip Atwell and Dr. Dre | Eminem featuring Dr. Dre |
| 2000 | "Hello" | | Ice Cube featuring MC Ren and Dr. Dre |
| 2002 | "The Knoc" | Jeff Richter | Knoc-turn'al featuring Missy Elliott and Dr. Dre |
| 2002 | "Symphony in X Major" | Joe Hahn | Xzibit featuring Dr. Dre |
