= Up in Smoke Tour =

2000 concert tour by Dr. Dre, Snoop Dogg, Ice Cube and Eminem

- Continental tour by Dr. Dre, Snoop Dogg, Ice Cube, Eminem
- Location: United States; Canada
- Associated albums: The Chronic 2001; The Marshall Mathers LP; No Limit Top Dogg; War & Peace, Vol. 2
- Start date: June 15, 2000
- End date: August 20, 2000
- No. of shows: 44

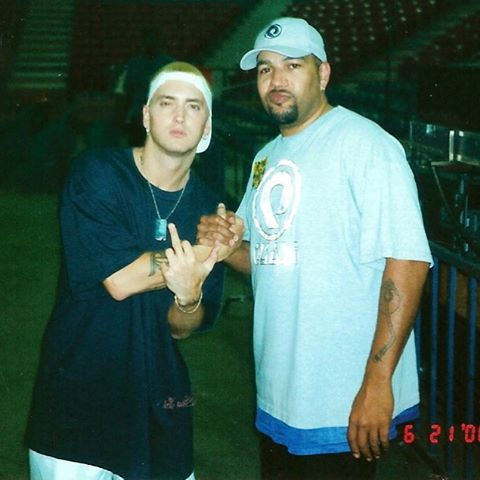
Eminem (left) at the Up in Smoke Tour

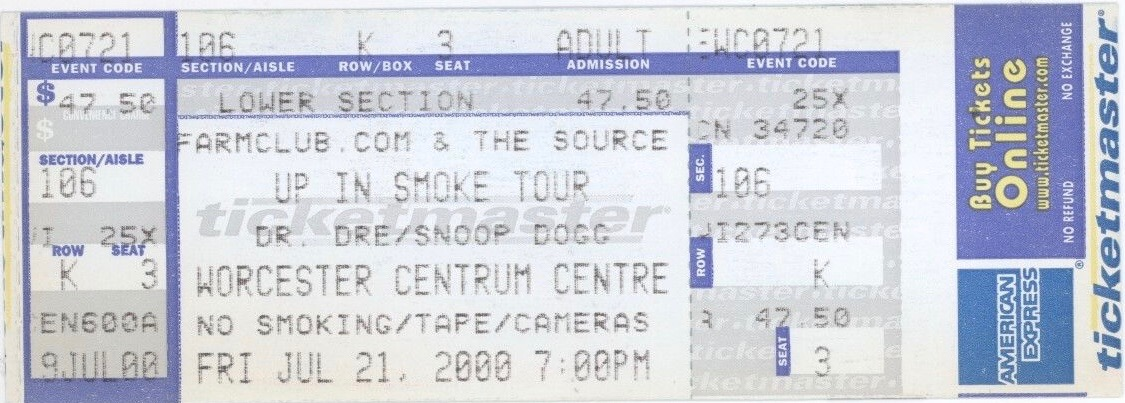
Ticket for the Up in Smoke Tour in Worcester, Massachusetts

The Up in Smoke Tour was a West Coast hip hop concert tour in 2000 in the United States and Canada headlined by Dr. Dre and Snoop Dogg, also featuring artists and disc jockeys Ice Cube, Eminem, Proof, Nate Dogg, Kurupt, D12, MC Ren, Westside Connection, Chilldrin of da Ghetto, Mel-Man, Tha Eastsidaz, Doggy's Angels, Devin The Dude, Warren G, Crucial Conflict, TQ, Truth Hurts, Xzibit, The D.O.C., Hittman, DJ Crazy Toones, Six-Two, Ms. Toi, & DJ Jam.

The tour included 44 shows and grossed $22 million. Ticket prices were set at $35, $45, and $55.

In 2022, HotNewHipHop described the tour as "arguably still one of the most epic tours in hip-hop history".

There have been rumors of a possible sequel for the tour; however, none have materialized.

== Background ==
The tour was announced in 1999 ahead of the release of the collaborative album 2001 by Dr. Dre, with the tour lineup including Snoop Dogg, Dr. Dre, Eminem, Ice Cube, Xzibit, Warren G, and Nate Dogg.

The tour was expected to improve the reputation of live rap shows after five people were stabbed in April 2000 at a Ruff Ryders/Cash Money Records show and despite the "arrests, controversy and tragedy" of several of the performers.

The tour was the first tour for Dr. Dre. Tickets went on sale in early May 2000.

On June 17, 2000, Nate Dogg was charged with kidnapping, domestic violence, terrorist threats, and arson for allegedly assaulting his former girlfriend and setting her mother's car on fire in Lakewood. That day, Dr. Dre posted a $1 million bond so that Nate Dogg can perform on the tour.

== Setlist and performance order ==
Kurupt performed as the opening act. Warren G and Xzibit performed together second, then Ice Cube performed third whilst Eminem performed in the fourth set. Dr. Dre and Snoop Dogg were the final set with the N.W.A reunion and The D.O.C. performance taking place during this segment. Other artists performed on the tour as "surprise guests".

The set ended with a 3-song performance by a reunion of N.W.A.

The performance lasted 4 hours. None of the headliners had live instruments or dancers; they just used DJs.

== Tour dates ==
The tour's itinerary included the following cities and dates:

Date	City	Country	Venue
June 15, 2000	Chula Vista	United States	Coors Amphitheatre
June 16, 2000	Anaheim	United States	Arrowhead Pond of Anaheim
June 18, 2000	Anaheim	United States	Arrowhead Pond of Anaheim
June 19, 2000	San Jose	United States	San Jose Arena
June 21, 2000	Sacramento	United States	ARCO Arena
June 23, 2000	Seattle	United States	Memorial Stadium^{[A]}
June 24, 2000	Portland	United States	Rose Garden
June 26, 2000	Nampa	United States	Idaho Center
June 30, 2000	Indianapolis	United States	Conseco Fieldhouse
July 1, 2000	Columbus	United States	Value City Arena
July 2, 2000	Cleveland	United States	Gund Arena
July 4, 2000	Toronto	Canada	Molson Amphitheatre
July 6, 2000	Detroit	United States	Joe Louis Arena
July 7, 2000	Auburn Hills	United States	The Palace of Auburn Hills
July 8, 2000	Rosemont	United States	Allstate Arena
July 9, 2000	Milwaukee	United States	Bradley Center
July 10, 2000	Minneapolis	United States	Target Center
July 13, 2000	Rochester	United States	Blue Cross Arena
July 14, 2000	Albany	United States	Pepsi Arena
July 15, 2000	East Rutherford	United States	Continental Airlines Arena
July 16, 2000	Scranton	United States	Coors Light Amphitheatre
July 18, 2000	Philadelphia	United States	First Union Spectrum
July 19, 2000	Uniondale	United States	Nassau Coliseum
July 20, 2000	Worcester	United States	Worcester's Centrum Centre
July 21, 2000	Worcester	United States	Worcester's Centrum Centre
July 22, 2000	Hartford	United States	Hartford Civic Center
July 25, 2000	Buffalo	United States	HSBC Arena
July 26, 2000	Pittsburgh	United States	Mellon Arena
July 27, 2000	Washington, D.C.	United States	MCI Center
July 28, 2000	Baltimore	United States	Baltimore Arena
July 29, 2000 CANCELLED	Charlotte	United States	Charlotte Coliseum
August 1, 2000	Sunrise	United States	National Car Rental Center
August 2, 2000	Tampa	United States	Ice Palace
August 4, 2000	Atlanta	United States	Lakewood Amphitheatre
August 5, 2000	New Orleans	United States	New Orleans Arena
August 6, 2000	Houston	United States	Astrodome
August 7, 2000	Dallas	United States	Smirnoff Music Centre
August 8, 2000	San Antonio	United States	Alamodome
August 10, 2000	Phoenix	United States	America West Arena
August 11, 2000	Paradise	United States	Thomas & Mack Center
August 12, 2000	Fresno	United States	Selland Arena
August 13, 2000	San Jose	United States	San Jose Arena
August 15, 2000	Tacoma	United States	Tacoma Dome
August 16, 2000	Vancouver	Canada	General Motors Place
August 18, 2000	West Valley City	United States	E Center
August 20, 2000	Greenwood Village	United States	Fiddler's Green Amphitheatre

^{A} The Seattle concert was a part of the opening celebration of the Experience Music Project Museum

== DVD release ==
The Up in Smoke Tour

Video by Dr. Dre, Snoop Dogg, Eminem and Ice Cube
- Released: December 5, 2000
- Recorded: July 20 + 21, 2000 at The Centrum, Worcester, Massachusetts
- Genres: Hip hop; gangsta rap; horrorcore; comedy hip hop; g-funk
- Label: Eagle Vision
- Director: Philip G. Atwell
- Producer: J. Kevin Swain

Professional ratings
Review scores
Source	Rating
AllMusic	3/5 stars

Ice Cube performance

1. "Hello" (featuring MC Ren)
2. "You Can Do It" (featuring Ms. Toi)
3. "The Gutter Shit"
4. "The Pledge (Insert) from Westside Connection"
5. "Whoa! (Ice Cube Freestyle)"
6. "Hoo-Bangin' (WSCG Style)"
7. "Drug Lord' (Chilldrin of da Ghetto)"
8. "AmeriKKKa's Most Wanted"
9. "The Nigga Ya Love to Hate"
10. "Cube's Freestyle"
11. "We Be Clubbin'"

Eminem/Proof performance

1. "Kill You"
2. "Dead Wrong" (Originally The Notorious B.I.G. featuring Eminem, this featured only Eminem's verse and the original chorus)
3. "Under the Influence" (featuring D12)
4. "Marshall Mathers"
5. "Criminal"
6. "The Real Slim Shady"

Dr. Dre/Snoop Dogg performance

1. "The Next Episode" (Dr. Dre featuring Snoop Dogg, Kurupt and Nate Dogg)
2. "Who Am I (What's My Name)?" (Snoop Dogg)
3. "Nuthin' but a "G" Thang" (Dr. Dre featuring Snoop Dogg)
4. "Gettin My Money" (Crucial Conflict)
5. "Bitch Please" (Snoop Dogg featuring Xzibit & Nate Dogg)
6. "What's the Difference" (Dr. Dre featuring Xzibit and Eminem)
7. "Forgot About Dre" (Dr. Dre featuring Eminem)
8. "Boyz-N-The Hood – Eazy-E (Tribute)"
9. "Still Not a Player – Big Pun (Tribute)"
10. "One More Chance / Stay With Me (Remix) – The Notorious B.I.G. (Tribute)"
11. "More Bounce to the Ounce – Roger Troutman (Tribute)"
12. "Hail Mary – Makaveli (Tribute)"
13. "California Love – 2Pac (Tribute)"
14. "2 of Amerikaz Most Wanted – 2Pac (Tribute)"
15. "Bust One Fa Ya – Devin The Dude"
16. "Showdown" (Crucial Conflict)
17. "Fuck You" (Dr. Dre f. Devin the Dude and Snoop Dogg)
18. "Let Me Ride (G-Funk Remix)" (Truth Hurts)
19. "Still D.R.E." (Dr. Dre featuring Snoop Dogg)

== Certifications ==
Region	Certification	Certified units/sales
Australia (ARIA)	8× Platinum	120,000^{^}
France (SNEP)	2× Platinum	40,000^{*}
Germany (BVMI)	Gold	25,000^{^}
United States (RIAA)	6× Platinum	600,000^{^}
^{*} Sales figures based on certification alone.^{^} Shipments figures based on certification alone.
