= Super Bowl LVI halftime show =

Event during the 2022 Super Bowl

- Part of: Super Bowl LVI
- Date: February 13, 2022
- Location: Inglewood, California, U.S.
- Venue: SoFi Stadium
- Headliner: Dr. Dre; Snoop Dogg; Eminem; Mary J. Blige; Kendrick Lamar; 50 Cent (surprise appearance)
- Special guests: Anderson .Paak
- Sponsor: Pepsi
- Director: Hamish Hamilton
- Producer: Jesse Collins; Roc Nation

Super Bowl halftime show chronology
LV (2021)	LVI (2022)	LVII (2023)

The Super Bowl LVI halftime show, officially known as the Pepsi Super Bowl LVI Halftime Show, was the halftime entertainment of Super Bowl LVI, which took place on February 13, 2022, at SoFi Stadium in Inglewood, California. The show was headlined by Dr. Dre, Snoop Dogg, Eminem, Mary J. Blige, and Kendrick Lamar, and included surprise appearance by 50 Cent and guest appearance by Anderson .Paak. It was the first Super Bowl halftime show to be centered entirely around hip hop music, as well as the last halftime show to be sponsored by Pepsi, with Apple Music taking over the sponsorship beginning with Super Bowl LVII. The show was televised nationally in the U.S. by NBC.

The performance was met with critical acclaim and was the first Super Bowl halftime show to win the Primetime Emmy Award for Outstanding Variety Special (Live). The show also won the Primetime Emmy Awards for Outstanding Production Design for a Variety Special and Outstanding Music Direction.

== Background ==
On May 15, 2021, in an interview with Yahoo!, Snoop Dogg expressed interest in performing at the halftime show with other hip hop artists such as Dr. Dre, Kendrick Lamar and Eminem.

On September 30, 2021, Pepsi and Roc Nation announced that Dr. Dre, Snoop Dogg, Eminem, Mary J. Blige, and Kendrick Lamar would headline the show. Blige previously performed at the Super Bowl XXXV halftime show in 2001. The halftime show was produced by Jesse Collins and Roc Nation, and was directed by Hamish Hamilton, who has directed each Super Bowl halftime show for twelve years. Deaf rappers Sean Forbes and Warren "WAWA" Snipe performed as American Sign Language interpreters.

== Reception ==
The halftime show received critical acclaim as critics praised the lineup and setlist. Some mentioned that the performance was crafted to induce nostalgia among Generation X and Millennial audiences.

Steven McIntosh of BBC News wrote that the timing was balanced enough to allow each artist to perform their biggest songs, concluding "The show had been a success, and they knew it. It might have taken a long time to get here, but after a performance like this, nobody could now Forget About Dre."

A list in Rolling Stone by Rob Sheffield praised the performance as an "old-school West Coast rap history lesson" and, before 2026, ranked it the fourth-best Super Bowl halftime show of all time, behind those by Beyoncé, U2 and Prince. He wrote that Kendrick Lamar deserved his own full-length performance (which he did three years later), and named Eminem taking a knee as the highlight.

Kevin E G Perry of The Independent gave the show four stars out of five. Commenting on criticism relating to Dr. Dre's history of violence against women, Perry concluded "No performance could wash that blemish from his reputation, but tonight's hit-packed performance did demonstrate the range and longevity of Dre's influence as a rapper and producer". Perry was also thankful that rumors of the return of the controversial 2012 Tupac hologram were not true.

In a review for The New York Times, Jon Caramanica commented that rumors of Eminem being barred from kneeling "had the feel of a pre-manufactured controversy"; as an NFL spokesperson confirmed that the gesture was authorized, Caramanica asked "Is it still protest if it's been signed off on and approved?"

Sam Wolfson of The Guardian gave the show five stars out of five.

The Federal Communications Commission received 33 complaints regarding the show's content, an unusually low number (compared to 1,300 for the Super Bowl LIV halftime show, 50 for the Super Bowl LIII halftime show and 540,000 for the Super Bowl XXXVIII halftime show).

== Awards and nominations ==
Award	Date of ceremony	Category	Nominee(s)	Result	Ref.
Primetime Emmy Awards	September 3 and 4, 2022	Outstanding Variety Special (Live)	Shawn Carter, Desiree Perez, Jesse Collins, Dionne Harmon, Dave Meyers, Aaron B. Cooke, Dr. Dre, Snoop Dogg, Mary J. Blige, Eminem, Kendrick Lamar, and 50 Cent	Won	
Primetime Emmy Awards	September 3 and 4, 2022	Outstanding Directing for a Variety Special	Hamish Hamilton	Nominated	
Primetime Emmy Awards	September 3 and 4, 2022	Outstanding Music Direction	Adam Blackstone	Won	
Primetime Emmy Awards	September 3 and 4, 2022	Outstanding Production Design for a Variety Special	Bruce Rodgers, Shelley Rodgers, and Maria Garcia	Won	
Primetime Emmy Awards	September 3 and 4, 2022	Outstanding Sound Mixing for a Variety Series or Special	Thomas Holmes, Alex Guessard, Dave Natale, Tom Pesa, Christian Schrader, and Pablo Munguia	Nominated	

== Commercial impact ==
The show had an average of 103.4 million viewers in the 8:15–8:30 pm ET slot, up 7 percent from the previous year's halftime show by the Weeknd. The viewership for the halftime show was higher than the game itself, which was viewed by an average of 101.1 million television viewers.

Following the performance, streams of Dr. Dre's music rose by 185 percent on Spotify. Two of the songs that he performed, "The Next Episode" and "Still D.R.E." from his 1999 album 2001, experienced increases in streaming of 270 percent and 245 percent, respectively. In the end of the week, the album jumped back to the top 10 in Billboard 200 with 30,500 units sold, a 220% increase.

Also on Spotify, Mary J. Blige's "No More Drama" saw an increase of 520 percent, while streams of Kendrick Lamar's "Alright" rose 250 percent.

The following day, Eminem's "Lose Yourself" entered the top 10 of the U.S. Spotify chart for the first time ever. At the end of that week, Eminem's Curtain Call jumped 118 spots to the top 10 on Billboard 200, for the first time since March 11, 2006, at number eight, selling 31,000 units (256% increase). In the United Kingdom, the album jumped back into the Top 10 at number eight.

== Documentary ==
The creation and preparations for the halftime show was featured in the documentary The Show: California Love. The documentary, which was produced by the halftime show sponsor Pepsi's in-house content studio and Boardwalk Pictures, aired on Showtime on December 23, 2022.

== Set list ==
1. "The Next Episode" (Dr. Dre and Snoop Dogg); featured a brief instrumental sample of "Nuthin' but a G Thang"
2. "California Love" (Dr. Dre and Snoop Dogg) (Performed as a tribute to Tupac Shakur)
3. "In da Club" (50 Cent)
4. "Family Affair" (Mary J. Blige)
5. "No More Drama" (Mary J. Blige); featured a brief instrumental sample of "Head Over Heels" by Tears for Fears
6. "M.A.A.D City" (Kendrick Lamar)
7. "Alright" (Kendrick Lamar) (Background vocals by Pharrell Williams)
8. "Forgot About Dre" (Eminem and freestyle by Kendrick Lamar)
9. "Lose Yourself" (Eminem with Anderson .Paak on drums)
10. "I Ain't Mad at Cha" (instrumental) (Dr. Dre) (Played as a tribute to Tupac Shakur)
11. "Still D.R.E." (Dr. Dre, Snoop Dogg, Eminem, Mary J. Blige, Kendrick Lamar, and 50 Cent with Anderson .Paak on drums)
