= Fuck You (Dr. Dre song) =

Promotional single by Dr. Dre featuring Devin the Dude and Snoop Dogg

from the album 2001
- B-side: "Xxplosive"
- Released: 1999
- Recorded: 1999
- Studio: Encore Studios (Burbank, CA); Larrabee West (Los Angeles, CA); Dre's Crib (Los Angeles, CA)
- Genre: Hip hop
- Length: 3:25
- Label: Aftermath; Interscope
- Songwriters: Andre Young; Brian Bailey; Calvin Broadus; Devin Copeland
- Producers: Dr. Dre; Mel-Man

Dr. Dre chronology
"Still D.R.E." (1999)	"Fuck You" (1999)	"Xxplosive / What's the Difference" (1999)

"Fuck You", edited for radio as "F*** You", is a song by American rapper and record producer Dr. Dre, written by Hittman, Devin the Dude, Snoop Dogg and Dre himself. It features guest vocal appearances from Devin the Dude and Snoop Dogg, as well as contributions from Camara Kambon and Scott Storch on keyboards, Sean Cruse on guitar, Mike Elizondo on bass and Taku Hirano on percussion. Recording sessions took place at Encore Studios in Burbank, Larrabee West in West Hollywood, and Dre's Crib in Los Angeles. Production was handled by Dre together with Mel-Man.

The song was released in 1999 through Aftermath Entertainment and Interscope Records as a promotional single from Dr. Dre's second studio album 2001. The single managed to peak at No. 61 on the Hot R&B/Hip-Hop Songs, No. 52 on the R&B/Hip-Hop Airplay and No. 99 on the R&B/Hip-Hop Streaming Songs in the United States. To date, "Fuck You" is the highest charted song for Devin the Dude in the US, and his second highest music charts performance overall behind "Baby Phat".

== Track listing ==
12" vinyl 33 ⅓ RPM (INT8P-6719)
No.	Title	Writer(s)	Length
1.	"Fuck You" (featuring Devin the Dude and Snoop Dogg)	Andre Young; Brian Bailey; Calvin Broadus; Devin Copeland
2.	"Xxplosive" (featuring Hittman, Kurupt, Nate Dogg and Six-Two)	Young; Bailey; Ricardo Brown; Nathaniel Hale; Craig Longmiles
3.	"Fuck You" (Instrumental)
4.	"Xxplosive" (Instrumental)

== Personnel ==
- Andre "Dr. Dre" Young – songwriter, vocals, producer
- Devin "The Dude" Copeland – songwriter, vocals
- Calvin "Snoop Dogg" Broadus – songwriter, vocals
- Brian "Hittman" Bailey – songwriter
- Camara Kambon – keyboards
- Scott Storch – keyboards
- Sean Cruse – guitar
- Mike Elizondo – bass
- Taku Hirano – percussion
- Melvin "Mel-Man" Bradford – producer
- Richard "Segal" Huredia – engineering
- Dave Tenhouten – engineering assistant
- Steve Macauley – engineering assistant
- Pete Novak – engineering assistant

== Charts ==
Chart (2000)	Peak position
US Hot R&B/Hip-Hop Songs (Billboard)	61
US R&B/Hip-Hop Airplay (Billboard)	52
US R&B/Hip-Hop Streaming Songs (Billboard)	99

== Certifications ==
Certification for "Fuck You"
Region	Certification	Certified units/sales
New Zealand (RMNZ)	Platinum	30,000^{‡}
^{‡} Sales+streaming figures based on certification alone.
