= Kill You (disambiguation) =

"Kill You" is a 2000 song by Eminem from The Marshall Mathers LP.

Kill You may also refer to:

- "Kill You", a 2007 song by Dethklok from The Dethalbum
- "Kill You", a 1996 song by Korn from Life Is Peachy
