= Bitch Please II =

2000 single by Eminem

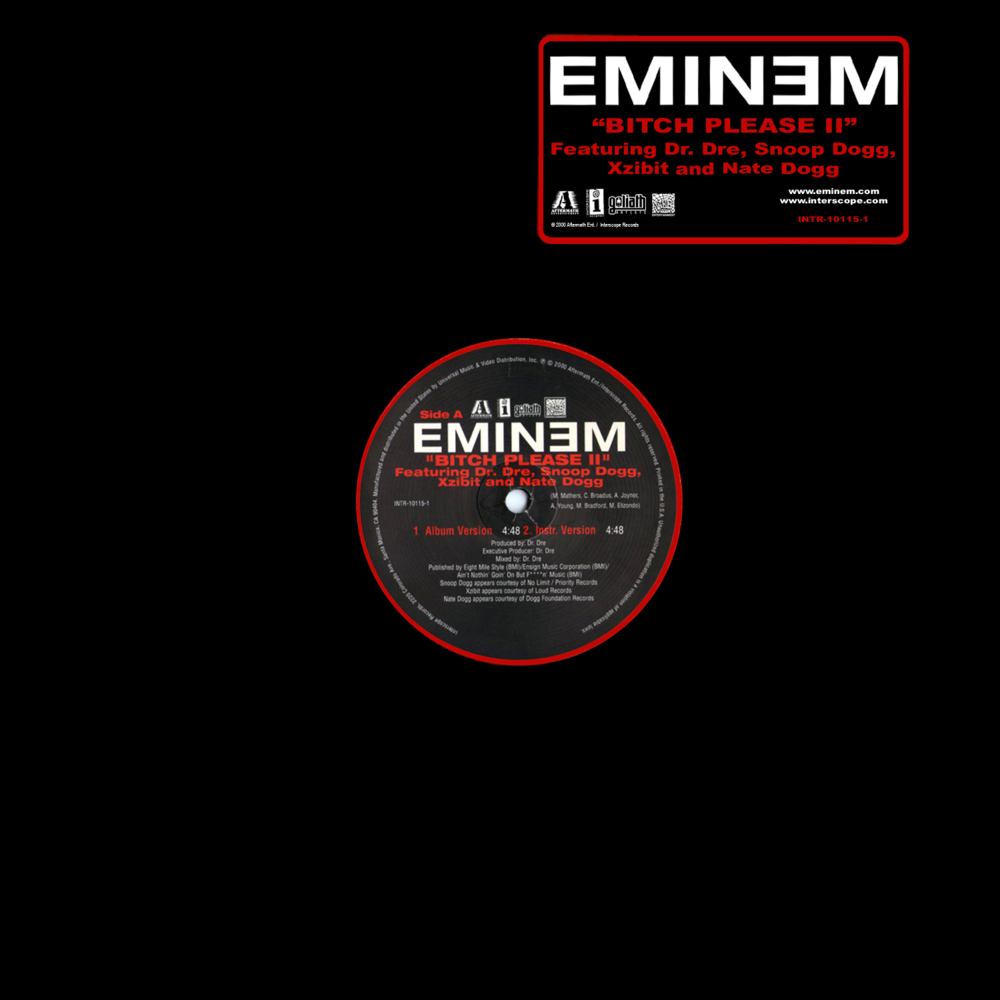
- Vinyl cover

Promotional single by Eminem featuring Dr. Dre, Snoop Dogg, Xzibit, and Nate Dogg

from the album The Marshall Mathers LP
- Released: May 23, 2001
- Genre: Gangsta rap; West Coast hip-hop; comedy hip-hop
- Length: 4:48
- Label: Interscope; Aftermath; Web
- Songwriters: Marshall Mathers; Andre Young; Calvin Broadus; Alvin Joiner; Nathaniel Hale; Melvin Bradford; Mike Elizondo
- Producers: Dr. Dre; Mel-Man

"Bitch Please II" is a song by American rapper Eminem, featuring guest vocals from Dr. Dre, Snoop Dogg, Xzibit, and Nate Dogg. It was released as a promotional single from Eminem's third studio album, The Marshall Mathers LP (2000).

== Background ==
The song is a sequel to the single "Bitch Please" by Snoop Dogg, released on April 29, 1999, as the second single from his fourth studio album, No Limit Top Dogg. It was one of two songs by Eminem to give a shout-out to Limp Bizkit with whom he would co-headline the first Anger Management Tour with in 2000 with Papa Roach, D12, and Xzibit appearing as support acts. The other song being "The Real Slim Shady", before their fallout in late 2000.

== Charts ==
Chart (2000)	Peak position
US Hot R&B/Hip-Hop Songs (Billboard)	61
US R&B/Hip-Hop Airplay (Billboard)	51

== Certifications ==
Certifications for "Bitch Please II"
Region	Certification	Certified units/sales
Australia (ARIA)	Platinum	70,000^{‡}
New Zealand (RMNZ)	Platinum	30,000^{‡}
United States (RIAA)	Gold	500,000^{‡}
^{‡} Sales+streaming figures based on certification alone.

== Personnel ==
Credits adapted from the album's liner notes and Tidal

- Eminem – vocals
- Dr. Dre – vocals, production, mixing
- Snoop Dogg – vocals
- Xzibit – vocals
- Nate Dogg – vocals
- Mel-Man – writing
- Richard "Segal" Huredia – engineering
- Mike Elizondo – bass, keyboards
- Jim McCrone – engineering assistance
