= The Watcher (song) =

2001 song by Dr. Dre

Single by Dr. Dre

from the album 2001
- Released: February 27, 2001
- Recorded: 1999
- Studio: Larrabee (Hollywood); Dre's Crib (Los Angeles)
- Genre: West Coast hip-hop; gangsta rap
- Length: 3:26
- Label: Aftermath; Interscope
- Songwriters: Andre Young; Marshall Mathers
- Producers: Dr. Dre; Mel-Man

Dr. Dre singles chronology
"The Next Episode" (2000)	"The Watcher" (2001)	"Put It on Me" (2001)

Eminem singles chronology
"Stan" (2000)	"The Watcher" (2001)	"Rock City" (2002)

Knoc-turn'al singles chronology
"The Watcher" (2001)	"Bad Intentions" (2001)

"The Watcher" is a song by American rapper and producer Dr. Dre from his second studio album 2001. The song was released as the fourth and final single from the album in France on February 27, 2001, and features vocals from rappers Eminem and Knoc-turn'al.

Rapper Jay-Z released a sequel titled "The Watcher 2" on his 2002 album The Blueprint 2: The Gift & The Curse. Jay-Z's version was produced by Dr. Dre and featured vocals from Dr. Dre, Jay-Z and Aftermath associates Rakim and Truth Hurts. A remix replacing Jay-Z's verse with a verse sung by Snoop Dogg would later be released, titled "The Watcher Pt. 3".

One of Dr. Dre's lines was later interpolated as the chorus for the song "Hello", a song by him and former N.W.A members Ice Cube and MC Ren.

The song's instrumental was used in the J. Cole song "Adonis Interlude (The Montage)". The song was produced by Dre and appeared on the soundtrack to the 2023 film Creed III.

== Track listing ==
CD single (France)

No.	Title	Writer(s)	Producer(s)	Length
1.	"The Watcher"	Andre Young; Marshall Mathers	Dr. Dre; Mel-Man	3:26
2.	"Bad Guys Always Die" (with Eminem)	Young; Mathers	Dr. Dre	4:38
Total length:				8:04

== Charts ==
Chart (2002)	Peak position
France (SNEP)	47

== Certifications ==
Region	Certification	Certified units/sales
New Zealand (RMNZ)	Platinum	30,000^{‡}
United Kingdom (BPI)	Silver	200,000^{‡}
^{‡} Sales+streaming figures based on certification alone.

== Sequel ==
"The Watcher 2"

Song by Jay-Z featuring Dr. Dre, Rakim and Truth Hurts

from the album The Blueprint 2: The Gift & The Curse
- Released: November 12, 2002
- Recorded: July 2002
- Genre: Hip-hop
- Length: 5:55
- Label: Roc-A-Fella; Def Jam
- Songwriters: Shawn Carter; Andre Young; Marshall Mathers; William Griffin; Shari Watson
- Producers: Dr. Dre; Scott Storch

A sequel to the song was made by American rapper Jay-Z and released on November 12, 2002 for his seventh studio album The Blueprint 2: The Gift & The Curse, where it was titled "The Watcher 2". The song is performed by Jay-Z, alongside Dr. Dre, Rakim and R&B singer Truth Hurts. The song was featured as the third track to The Blueprint 2 and its reissue, Blueprint 2.1. Jay-Z performs the first verse. During it he shouts out fellow Roc-A-Fella associates Damon Dash and Kareem Burke, mentions Robb Report and references the Eric B. & Rakim song "Eric B. Is President". This is then followed on by Truth Hurts' bridge and the hook, with the same lyrics as the original hook sung by Eminem. This then bring Dre's verse, which begins with a similar pattern to Dre's song "Still D.R.E.". The third verse is performed by Rakim. He references his opening line on "Lyrics of Fury", from the Eric B. & Rakim album Follow the Leader. Rakim told Who that the song was originally intended to be a Dr. Dre project: "That was a Dre project, man. A joint that I did for Dre. Jay-Z heard it and the rest is history, man.".
