= Mel-Man =

American record producer and songwriter

- Also known as: Mel-Man
- Born: Melvin Charles Bradford
- Origin: Pittsburgh, Pennsylvania, U.S.
- Genre: West Coast hip hop
- Occupations: Record producer; songwriter
- Years active: 1993–present
- Label: Aftermath

Melvin Charles Bradford, professionally known as Mel-Man, is an American West Coast hip hop record producer and songwriter from Pittsburgh, Pennsylvania. Signed with Aftermath Entertainment, he is best known for his work with Dr. Dre, producing songs for the likes of Eminem, Xzibit, Truth Hurts, The Firm, Busta Rhymes and Snoop Dogg.

A man named Michael Lowe filed a copyright infringement lawsuit against Xzibit, Dr. Dre and Bradford about the song "X".

In 2002, French jazz pianist Jacques Loussier filed a $10 million lawsuit that was later settled out of court. The lawsuit claimed the beat for the Eminem track "Kill You" was stolen from his song "Pulsion".

== Credits ==
Year	Song	Artist	Album	Credits
1993	"Knock Em Off"	Mel-Man		
1996	"The Aftermath (Intro)"	RC & Sid McCoy	Dr. Dre Presents the Aftermath	Songwriter, co-producer
1996	"Shittin' on the World"	Mel-Man	Dr. Dre Presents the Aftermath	Vocals, songwriter, producer
1997	"Los Angeles Times"	Xzibit	Soul in the Hole soundtrack and 40 Dayz & 40 Nightz	Songwriter, producer
1997	"Untouchable"	The Firm	The Album	Songwriter, producer
1998	"Eve of Destruction"	Eve	Bulworth soundtrack	Songwriter, producer
1999	"Role Model"	Eminem	The Slim Shady LP	Songwriter, producer
1999	"Bad Guys Always Die"	Dr. Dre & Eminem	Wild Wild West (soundtrack)	Producer
1999	"The Watcher"	Dr. Dre	2001	Producer
1999	"Fuck You"	Dr. Dre, Snoop Dogg & Devin the Dude	2001	Producer
1999	"Still D.R.E."	Dr. Dre & Snoop Dogg	2001	Songwriter, producer
1999	"Big Ego's"	Dr. Dre & Hittman	2001	Songwriter, producer
1999	"Xxplosive"	Dr. Dre, Hittman, Kurupt, Nate Dogg & Six-Two	2001	Producer
1999	"What's the Difference"	Dr. Dre, Eminem, Xzibit & Phish	2001	Songwriter, producer
1999	"Light Speed"	Dr. Dre & Hittman	2001	Producer
1999	"Forgot About Dre"	Dr. Dre & Eminem	2001	Songwriter, producer
1999	"The Next Episode"	Dr. Dre & Snoop Dogg	2001	Songwriter, producer
1999	"Let's Get High"	Dr. Dre, Kurupt & Ms. Roq	2001	Additional vocals, producer
1999	"Bitch Niggaz"	Dr. Dre, Snoop Dogg, Hittman & Six-Two	2001	Bass, songwriter, producer
1999	"The Car Bomb"	Dr. Dre, Mel-Man & Charis Henry	2001	Vocals
1999	"Murder Ink"	Dr. Dre, Hittman & Ms. Roq	2001	Producer
1999	"Some L.A. Niggaz"	Dr. Dre, Hittman, Defari, Xzibit, Knoc-turn'al, Time Bomb, King T, MC Ren & Kokane	2001	Producer
1999	"Housewife"	Dr. Dre, Hittman & Kurupt	2001	Songwriter, producer
1999	"Ackrite"	Dr. Dre & Hittman	2001	Songwriter, producer
1999	"Bang Bang"	Dr. Dre, Hittman & Knoc-turn'al	2001	Producer
2000	"Kill You"	Eminem	The Marshall Mathers LP	Songwriter, producer
2000	"Who Knew"	Eminem	The Marshall Mathers LP	Songwriter, producer
2000	"The Real Slim Shady"	Eminem	The Marshall Mathers LP	Songwriter, producer
2000	"Remember Me?"	Eminem, RBX & Sticky Fingaz	The Marshall Mathers LP	Producer
2000	"I'm Back"	Eminem	The Marshall Mathers LP	Songwriter, producer
2000	"Bitch Please II"	Eminem, Dr. Dre, Snoop Dogg, Xzibit & Nate Dogg	The Marshall Mathers LP	Songwriter
2000	"Hello"	Ice Cube, MC Ren, Dr. Dre	War & Peace, Vol. 2 (The Peace Disc)	Producer
2000	"Year 2000 (Remix)"	Xzibit & KoЯn	Music from and Inspired by the Motion Picture Black and White	Songwriter, producer
2000	"X"	Xzibit	Restless	Songwriter, producer
2000	"Get Your Walk On"	Xzibit	Restless	Songwriter, producer
2001	"Sally"	Bilal	1st Born Second	Producer
2001	"Bounce (Let Me See Ya Throw It)"	Busta Rhymes	Genesis	Producer
2001	"I Pledge Allegiance"	Nate Dogg	Music & Me	Producer
2001	"Dogg Named Snoop"	Snoop Dogg	Bones (soundtrack)	Producer
2001	"Benefit of the Doubt"	Truth Hurts & Shaunta	The Wash (The Original Motion Picture Soundtrack)	Producer
2001	"No"	Joe Beast	The Wash (The Original Motion Picture Soundtrack)	Producer
2002	"Tired"	Truth Hurts	Truthfully Speaking	Producer
2002	"The One and Only"	Snoop Dogg	Paid tha Cost to Be da Bo$$	Songwriter
2003	"Breathe"	Blu Cantrell	Bittersweet	Songwriter
2004	"Watch Out"	Knoc-turn'al & Hittman	The Way I Am	Producer
2015	"D.G.I.F.U."	Chris Brown & Tyga	Fan of a Fan: The Album	Songwriter
2017	"That's My Nigga"	Meek Mill, YG & Snoop Dogg	Bright: The Album	Songwriter
2023	"Doomsday"	Lyrical Lemonade, Juice Wrld & Cordae	All Is Yellow	Co-producer
