= The Next Episode =

2000 single by Dr. Dre featuring Snoop Dogg

Single by Dr. Dre featuring Snoop Dogg

from the album 2001
- B-side: "Bad Guys Always Die"
- Released: July 4, 2000
- Recorded: 1999
- Studio: Encore (Burbank, California); Sierra Sonics (Reno, Nevada)
- Genre: Gangsta rap
- Length: 2:41
- Label: Aftermath; Interscope
- Songwriters: Andre Young; Calvin Broadus; Brian Bailey; Melvin Bradford; David Axelrod
- Producers: Dr. Dre; Mel-Man

Dr. Dre singles chronology
"Hello" (2000)	"The Next Episode" (2000)	"The Watcher" (2001)

Snoop Dogg singles chronology
"Still D.R.E." (1999)	"The Next Episode" (2000)	"Snoop Dogg (What's My Name Pt. 2)" (2000)

Kurupt singles chronology
"Girls All Pause" (1999)	"The Next Episode" (2000)	"Who Ride Wit Us" (2000)

Nate Dogg singles chronology
"Game Don't Wait" (1999)	"The Next Episode" (2000)	"Where I Wanna Be" (2000)

Music video
- "The Next Episode" on YouTube

"The Next Episode" is a single by American rapper and producer Dr. Dre, released in 2000 as the third single from his second studio album, 2001 (1999). The track features Snoop Dogg, Kurupt, and Nate Dogg, but only Snoop Dogg is credited. It is a sequel to Dre and Snoop's famous single "Nuthin' but a 'G' Thang" from the former's debut album, The Chronic.

The song peaked at number 23 on the Billboard Hot 100.

The song has been performed live numerous times by both Dr. Dre and Snoop Dogg. Notable performances include the 2000 Up in Smoke Tour and as the opener to Super Bowl LVI halftime show on February 13, 2022. The duo also performed the song during the concluding segment of Los Angeles' contribution to the 2024 Summer Olympics closing ceremony, a nod to the fact that Los Angeles 2028 is the "next episode" of the Summer Olympics.

== Background ==
"The Next Episode" is produced by Dr. Dre and fellow Aftermath producer Mel-Man. The song predominantly samples "The Edge" by actor and musician David McCallum and producer David Axelrod, originally released on McCallum's 1967 album Music: A Bit More of Me.

== Music video ==
The music video is set in a strip club with many strippers pole-dancing. It also features cameos from rappers including Hittman, Kurupt, Warren G, and Xzibit.

== In popular culture ==
An unauthorized remix by Danish producer Hedegaard titled "Smoke Weed Everyday" gained significant popularity online. A parody of the song was included in the 2012 movie The Dictator, with new lyrics referring to the film's fictitious leader General Aladeen. This recording also featured on the film's soundtrack.

== Track listings ==
- UK CD single #1
1. "The Next Episode" (LP version) – 2:42
2. "Bad Guys Always Die" (featuring Eminem) – 4:38
3. "The Next Episode" (instrumental) – 2:43
4. "The Next Episode" (music video)
- UK CD single #2
1. "The Next Episode" (LP version) - 2:42
2. "Fuck You" - 3:25
3. "Bang Bang" (instrumental) - 3:42
4. "Forgot About Dre" (instrumental) - 3:54
5. "Forgot About Dre" (music video)
- 12" vinyl
1. "The Next Episode" (LP version) – 2:42
2. "Bad Guys Always Die" (featuring Eminem) – 4:38
3. "Bang Bang" (featuring Hittman) - 3:42

== Charts ==
=== Weekly charts ===
Chart (2000)	Peak position
Austria (Ö3 Austria Top 40)	56
Belgium (Ultratip Bubbling Under Flanders)	6
Belgium (Ultratip Bubbling Under Wallonia)	9
Canada Radio (Nielsen BDS)	36
France (SNEP)	22
Germany (GfK)	34
Ireland (IRMA)	11
Netherlands (Dutch Top 40)	28
Netherlands (Single Top 100)	26
Scottish Singles Sales (Official Charts)	7
Switzerland (Schweizer Hitparade)	34
UK Singles (Official Charts)	3
UK Dance (Official Charts)	13
UK Hip Hop/R&B (Official Charts)	2
US Billboard Hot 100	23
US Hot R&B/Hip-Hop Songs (Billboard)	11

Chart (2022–2023)	Peak position
Canada Hot 100 (Billboard)	21
Canada Digital Song Sales (Billboard)	2
Global 200 (Billboard)	35
Hungary (Single Top 40)	15
Sweden Heatseeker (Sverigetopplistan)	16

=== Year-end charts ===
Chart (2000)	Position
US Billboard Hot 100	76
US R&B/Hip-Hop Songs (Billboard)	49
Chart (2001)	Position
Ireland (IRMA)	75
UK Singles (OCC)	79
UK Urban (Music Week)	40
Chart (2022)	Position
US Digital Song Sales (Billboard)	74

== Certifications ==
Region	Certification	Certified units/sales
Austria (IFPI Austria)	Platinum	50,000^{*}
Denmark (IFPI Danmark)	Platinum	90,000^{‡}
Germany (BVMI)	Gold	250,000^{‡}
Italy (FIMI)	Platinum	100,000^{‡}
New Zealand (RMNZ)	5× Platinum	150,000^{‡}
Spain (Promusicae)	Gold	30,000^{‡}
United Kingdom (BPI)	2× Platinum	1,200,000^{‡}
Streaming
Denmark (IFPI Danmark)	Gold	900,000^{†}
^{*} Sales figures based on certification alone.^{‡} Sales+streaming figures based on certification alone.^{†} Streaming-only figures based on certification alone.

== Personnel ==
- Recorded at: Sierra Sonics, Encore Studios
- Engineer: Richard "Segal" Huredia
- Assistant engineer: Tom Gordon, Michelle Lynn Forbes, Dave Tenhouten
- Background Vocals - Kurupt
- Bass - Preston Crump
- Guitar - Sean Cruse
- Keyboards - Camara Kambon
- Rap [Featuring] - Snoop Dogg, Kurupt
- Vocals [Featuring] - Nate Dogg
- Director - Paul Hunter
- Writers - Ms Roq, Hittman, Snoop Dogg, Nate Dogg, David McCallum
- Video cameo appearance - Xzibit, Hittman, Warren G
