= Forgot About Dre =

2000 single by Dr. Dre featuring Eminem

Single by Dr. Dre featuring Eminem

from the album 2001
- B-side: "Still D.R.E."
- Released: January 29, 2000
- Recorded: February 1999
- Studio: Sierra Sonics (Reno); Larrabee West (Hollywood); A&M (Hollywood); Record One (Los Angeles)
- Genre: Hip-hop
- Length: 3:42
- Label: Aftermath; Interscope
- Songwriters: Andre Young; Marshall Mathers; Melvin Bradford
- Producers: Dr. Dre; Mel-Man

Dr. Dre singles chronology
"Still D.R.E." (1999)	"Forgot About Dre" (2000)	"Hello" (2000)

Eminem singles chronology
"Dead Wrong" (1999)	"Forgot About Dre" (2000)	"The Real Slim Shady" (2000)

Music videos
- "Forgot About Dre" (Explicit) on YouTube; "Forgot About Dre" (Edited) on YouTube

Audio sample
- file; help

"Forgot About Dre" is a song by American rapper and producer Dr. Dre featuring American rapper Eminem. It was released on January 29, 2000 as the second single from Dr. Dre's album 2001 (1999).

== Background ==
The song is considered a response to diss tracks by Death Row artists on Suge Knight Represents: Chronic 2000, a compilation released by Suge Knight that takes its title from Dre's 1992 album The Chronic. The line "Who you think brought you the oldies, Eazy-E's, Ice Cube's, and DOC's, the Snoop D.O. Double G's, and the group that said 'Motherfuck the police'?" outlines Dre's importance in the rap world, the theme of the song. Dre also mentions how people said he turned to pop music and the criticism that Nas' supergroup The Firm received about The Album, which Dre produced. Eminem's verse features the bizarre violence and aggression typical of his "Slim Shady" alter ego. In an interview, Kendrick Lamar said this and Six-Two's verse from "Xxplosive" tied for the best verses on 2001.

Eminem's lyrics were originally supposed to be performed by Snoop Dogg. Eminem wrote the lyrics, then recorded himself performing them as “reference vocals” for Snoop. Dre liked how it sounded, so he kept Eminem's version in.

The song samples "The Climb" by No Doubt.

== Music video ==
The video was directed by Philip G. Atwell and was shot between December 24–26, 1999. It was released on January 9, 2000. The video opens at night with Dr. Dre rapping in front of a newsstand in a city. Eminem raps as he walks through a dark city street. A few explicit lines in Eminem's verse are replaced with a skit in which Eminem answers reporter Jane Yamamoto's questions about a fire he and Dre started. When the video ends, it switches to "Last Dayz" by Hittman where he raps most of the 1st verse. This video won the MTV Video Music Award for Best Rap Video in 2000.

== Critical reception ==
Stephen Thomas Erlewine of AllMusic called "Forgot About Dre" a standout track, praising Eminem's unpredictability. NME wrote that the song "jogs [listeners'] memories" as to Dre's accomplishments" and keeps "his legend simmering." According to Chris Massey of PopMatters, "it's the frantic rap of Eminem that truly stands out, perhaps only because he's the freshest voice on board." Greg Tate of SPIN noted that Dr. Dre uses this song to "make sure all recognize his majesty", with Eminem "standing by him like a cartoon pitbull."

"Forgot About Dre" has been widely regarded as one of Eminem's best songs. Rolling Stone and The Guardian both ranked the song number three on their lists of the greatest Eminem songs.

== Awards and nominations ==
Year	Ceremony	Award	Result
43rd Annual Grammy Awards 21 February 2001	43rd Grammy Awards	Best Rap Performance by a Duo or Group	Won

== Track listing ==
UK CD single #1

No.	Title	Writer(s)	Producer(s)	Length
1.	"Forgot About Dre" (video version)	Andre Young; Melvin Bradford; Marshall Mathers	Dr. Dre; Mel-Man	3:42
2.	"Still D.R.E." (featuring Snoop Dogg)	Young; Bradford; Shawn Carter; Scott Storch	Dr. Dre; Mel-Man	4:34
3.	"Forgot About Dre" (instrumental)	Young; Bradford; Mathers	Dr. Dre; Mel-Man	3:42
4.	"Forgot About Dre" (explicit music video)	Young; Bradford; Mathers	Dr. Dre; Mel-Man	3:45
Total length:				15:42

UK CD single #2

Side A
No.	Title	Writer(s)	Producer(s)	Length
1.	"Forgot About Dre" (clean version)	Andre Young; Melvin Bradford; Marshall Mathers	Dr. Dre; Mel-Man	3:42
2.	"Still D.R.E." (featuring Snoop Dogg) (clean version)	Young; Bradford; Shawn Carter	Dr. Dre; Mel-Man	4:34
Total length:				8:16

Side B
No.	Title	Writer(s)	Producer(s)	Length
1.	"Forgot About Dre" (instrumental)	Young; Bradford; Mathers	Dr. Dre; Mel-Man	3:42
2.	"Forgot About Dre" (clean music video)	Young; Bradford; Mathers	Dr. Dre; Mel-Man	3:45
Total length:				7:27

12" vinyl

No.	Title	Writer(s)	Producer(s)	Length
1.	"Forgot About Dre" (director's cut video version)	Andre Young; Melvin Bradford; Marshall Mathers	Dr. Dre; Mel-Man	4:28
2.	"Forgot About Dre" (acappella version)	Young; Bradford; Mathers	Dr. Dre; Mel-Man	3:36
3.	"Forgot About Dre" (instrumental)	Young; Bradford; Mathers	Dr. Dre; Mel-Man	3:42
4.	"The Next Episode" (instrumental) (featuring Snoop Dogg)	Young; Bradford; Ricardo Brown; Brian Bailey; Melvin Bradford; Calvin Broadus, Jr.	Dr. Dre; Mel-Man	2:41
Total length:				14:27

== Charts ==
=== Weekly charts ===
Chart (2000)	Peak position
Canada (Nielsen SoundScan)	48
Canada Radio (Nielsen BDS)	33
Germany (GfK)	41
Ireland (IRMA)	20
Netherlands (Dutch Top 40)	19
Netherlands (Single Top 100)	16
New Zealand (Recorded Music NZ)	26
Sweden (Sverigetopplistan)	29
Switzerland (Schweizer Hitparade)	37
UK Singles (Official Charts)	7
UK Hip Hop/R&B (Official Charts)	3
US Billboard Hot 100	25
US Hot R&B/Hip-Hop Songs (Billboard)	14
US Pop Airplay (Billboard)	32
US Rhythmic Airplay (Billboard)	3

Chart (2022)	Peak position
Canada Digital Song Sales (Billboard)	12
Global 200 (Billboard)	100

=== Year-end charts ===
Chart (2000)	Position
Netherlands (Single Top 100)	71
UK Singles (OCC)	104
UK Urban (Music Week)	28
US Billboard Hot 100	73
US Hot R&B/Hip-Hop Songs (Billboard)	53

== Certifications ==
Region	Certification	Certified units/sales
Austria (IFPI Austria)	Gold	25,000^{*}
Denmark (IFPI Danmark)	Platinum	90,000^{‡}
Germany (BVMI)	Gold	250,000^{‡}
Italy (FIMI)	Gold	50,000^{‡}
New Zealand (RMNZ)	6× Platinum	180,000^{‡}
United Kingdom (BPI)	3× Platinum	1,800,000^{‡}
^{*} Sales figures based on certification alone.^{‡} Sales+streaming figures based on certification alone.
