= 2001 (Dr. Dre album) =

1999 studio album by Dr. Dre

- The original, explicit album cover, with the cannabis icon next to the "2001" text, and the background being a pitch-black color.

Studio album by Dr. Dre
- Released: November 16, 1999
- Recorded: 1998–1999
- Studios: Record One (Los Angeles); A&M (Hollywood); Larrabee (Hollywood); Dre's Crib (Los Angeles); Encore (Burbank, California); Sierra Sonics (Reno, Nevada)
- Genres: West Coast hip-hop; gangsta rap; G-funk; hardcore hip-hop
- Length: 68:01
- Labels: Aftermath; Interscope
- Producers: Dr. Dre; Mel-Man; Lord Finesse

Dr. Dre chronology
Back 'N The Day (1996)	2001 (1999)	Compton (2015)

Alternative cover
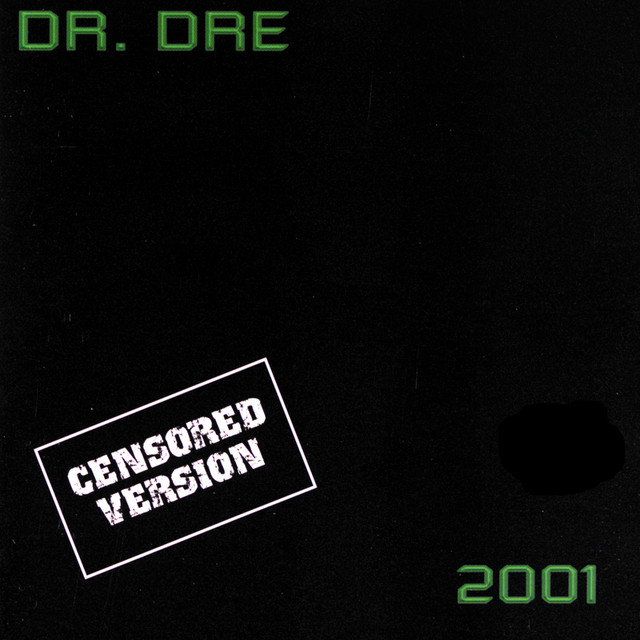
- The censored album cover, completely removing the cannabis icon, while also adding a white stamp that reads "CENSORED VERSION" as it suggests, and changing the pitch-black background to an abstract black, relief ink texture.

Singles from 2001
- 1. "Still D.R.E." Released: October 13, 1999; 2. "Forgot About Dre" Released: January 22, 2000; 3. "The Next Episode" Released: May 27, 2000; 4. "The Watcher" Released: February 27, 2001 (France only)

2001 (also referred to as The Chronic 2001 or The Chronic II) is the second studio album by the American rapper and producer Dr. Dre. It was released on November 16, 1999, by Aftermath Entertainment and Interscope Records as the follow-up to his 1992 debut album, The Chronic. The album was produced mainly by Dr. Dre and Mel-Man, as well as Lord Finesse, and it features eighteen guest contributions. The artists with small appearances include Ms. Roq, Six-Two, Traci Nelson, Tray Deee, Defari, Knoc-turn'al, Time Bomb, King T, MC Ren, Kokane, Devin the Dude, and pornstar Jake Steed, while the ones with several appearances include Hittman, Snoop Dogg, Kurupt, Xzibit, Eminem, and Nate Dogg.

2001 exhibits an expansion on Dre's debut G-funk sound and contains gangsta rap themes such as violence, crime, promiscuity, sex, drug use, and street gangs. The album debuted at number 2 on the U.S. Billboard 200 chart, selling 516,000 copies in its first week. It produced three singles that attained chart success and has been certified 6× Platinum by the Recording Industry Association of America (RIAA); as of August 2015 the album has sold 7,800,000 copies in the United States. 2001 was acclaimed by critics, many of whom praised the production and music, although some found the lyrics objectionable.

== Title and release ==
In 1995, the original successor to The Chronic was to be titled The Chronic II: A New World Odor (Poppa's Got A Brand New Funk). However, this version of the album was scrapped after Dre departed from Death Row Records.

After the creation of Aftermath Entertainment, the album was initially titled Chronic 2000 until Priority Records, who had become Death Row Records' new distributor decided, in conjunction with Death Row's founder and then-CEO Suge Knight, to call their newest compilation album Chronic 2000. Death Row owned the trademark for The Chronic as did Interscope Records who previously distributed the Death Row catalogue. Knight became aware of the title of Dr. Dre's album when notification for the trademark use was required by his label, Aftermath Records. When Aftermath heard that Priority and Death Row planned to use the same name for their album, Dre sought legal action. According to his lawyer Howard King, "both sides agreed that we'd allow the other to use the title, and then let the public decide which one they preferred".

After the release of Death Row's Chronic 2000, Interscope announced that Dr. Dre's album would now be named Chronic 2001: No Seeds through teaser posters displaying a "Summer '99" release date. Amongst the roster of guests listed on the posters were rappers Sticky Fingaz and RBX, who neither were featured on the finished album. Years later, in an interview with Sticky Fingaz, he stated the song featuring himself and RBX was the Eminem song "Remember Me?", which, at Eminem's request, was put aside for his then-upcoming album, The Marshall Mathers LP. Shortly after, Interscope began the main promotional campaign displaying a new release date, "October 26th 1999", and a new logo that drops the subtitle No Seeds. At this point, Priority decided not to honor the original agreement and threatened to sue Dr. Dre if the Chronic trademark were to be used in any capacity. Dre eventually decided to release the album as simply 2001 in November. Despite this, a marijuana leaf was added to the album cover next to 2001, a subtle nod to its original name.

In an interview with The New York Times, Dr. Dre spoke about his motivation to record the album and how he felt that he had to prove himself to fans and media again after doubts arose over his production and rapping ability. These doubts came from the fact that he had not released a solo studio album since 1992's The Chronic. He stated:

For the last couple of years, there's been a lot of talk out on the streets about whether or not I can still hold my own, whether or not I'm still good at producing. That was the ultimate motivation for me. Magazines, word of mouth, and rap tabloids were saying I didn't have it anymore. What more do I need to do? How many platinum records have I made? O.K., here's the album – now what do you have to say?

The album was first intended to be released like a mixtape; with tracks linked through interludes and turntable effects, but it was changed to be set up like a film. Dr. Dre stated, "Everything you hear is planned. It's a movie, with different varieties of situations. So you've got build-ups, touching moments, aggressive moments. You've even got a 'Pause for Porno.' It's got everything that a movie needs." Speaking of how he did not record the album for club or radio play and that he planned the album simply for entertainment with comical aspects throughout, he commented "I'm not trying to send out any messages or anything with this record. I just basically do hard-core hip-hop and try to add a touch of dark comedy here and there. A lot of times the media just takes this and tries to make it into something else when it's all entertainment first. You shouldn't take it too seriously."

== Recording ==
Some of the lyrics on the album used by Dre have been noted to be penned by several ghostwriters including Eminem, Jay-Z, and Hittman. Royce da 5'9" was rumored to be a ghostwriter on the album and though he was noted for writing the last track, "The Message", he is not credited by his legal name or alias in the liner notes. A track he recorded on the album, originally named "The Way I Be Pimpin'", was later retouched as "Xxplosive". "The Way I Be Pimpin'" has Dr. Dre rapping penned verses by Royce and features Royce's vocals on the chorus. Royce wrote several tracks such as "The Throne Is Mine" and "Stay in Your Place" which were later cut from the album. The tracks have been leaked later on several mixtapes, including Pretox.

The album's production expanded on that of The Chronic, with new, sparse beats and reduced use of samples which were prominent on his debut album. Co-producer Scott Storch talked of how Dr. Dre used his collaborators during recording sessions: "At the time, I saw Dr. Dre desperately needed something. He needed a fuel injection, and Dre utilized me as the nitrous oxide. He threw me into the mix, and I sort of tapped on a new flavor with my whole piano sound and the strings and orchestration. So I'd be on the keyboards, and Mike [Elizondo] was on the bass guitar, and Dre was on the drum machine." Josh Tyrangiel of Time has described the recording process which Dr. Dre employs, stating "Every Dre track begins the same way, with Dre behind a drum machine in a room full of trusted musicians. (They carry beepers. When he wants to work, they work.) He'll program a beat, then ask the musicians to play along; when Dre hears something he likes, he isolates the player and tells him how to refine the sound."

== Music ==
=== Production ===
The album primarily featured co-production between Dr. Dre and Mel-Man and was generally well received by critics. AllMusic writer Stephen Thomas Erlewine noted that Dr. Dre had expanded on the G-funk beats on his previous album, The Chronic, and stated, "He's pushed himself hard, finding new variations in the formula by adding ominous strings, soulful vocals, and reggae, resulting in fairly interesting recontextualizations" and went on to say, "Sonically, this is first-rate, straight-up gangsta."

Entertainment Weekly's Tom Sinclair depicted the album as "Chilly keyboard motifs gliding across gut-punching bass lines, strings and synths swooping in and out of the mix, naggingly familiar guitar licks providing visceral punctuation". NME described the production as "patented tectonic funk beats and mournful atmospherics". PopMatters praised the production, stating that "the hip-hop rhythms are catchy, sometimes in your face, sometimes subtle, but always a fine backdrop for the power of Dre's voice." Jon Pareles of The New York Times mentioned that the beats were "lean and immaculate, each one a pithy combination of beat, rap, melody and strategic silences".

The album marked the beginning of Dr. Dre's collaboration with keyboardist Scott Storch, who had previously worked with The Roots and is credited either as a co-writer or performer on several of 2001's tracks, including the hit single "Still D.R.E.". Storch would later go on to become a successful producer in his own right and has been credited as a co-producer with Dr. Dre on some of his productions since.

=== Lyrics ===
The lyrics on the album received criticism and created some controversy. They include many themes associated with gangsta rap, such as violence, promiscuity, street gangs, drive-by shootings, crime, and drug usage. Stephen Thomas Erlewine said that the only subject matter on the album was "violence, drugs, pussy, bitches, dope, guns, and gangsters" and that these themes have become repetitive and unchanged in the last ten years. Critics noted that Dr. Dre had differed from his effort to "clean up his act" which he tried to establish with his 1996 single, "Been There, Done That" from Dr. Dre Presents...The Aftermath.

NME mentioned that the album was full of "pig-headed, punk-dicked, 'bitch'-dissing along with requisite dollops of ho-slapping violence, marijuana-addled bravado and penis-sucking wish fulfillment." Massey noted that the lyrics were overly explicit but praised his delivery and flow: "His rhymes are quick, his delivery laid back yet full of punch." The rhymes involve Dr. Dre's return to the forefront of hip-hop, which is conveyed in the singles "Still D.R.E." and "Forgot About Dre". Many critics cited the last track, "The Message"; a song dedicated to Dr. Dre's deceased brother, as what the album could have been without the excessively explicit lyrics, with Massey calling it "downright beautiful" and "a classic of modern rap".

== Singles ==
"Still D.R.E."
The song exhibits a departure by Dr. Dre from the production style of his previous album, The Chronic (1992).

Three singles were released from the album: "Still D.R.E.", "Forgot About Dre" and "The Next Episode". Other tracks "Fuck You", "Let's Get High", "What's the Difference" and "Xxplosive" were not officially released as singles but received some radio airplay which resulted in them charting in the Hot R&B/Hip-Hop Singles & Tracks. "Still D.R.E." was released as the lead single in October 1999. It peaked at number 93 on the Billboard Hot 100, number 32 on the Hot R&B/Hip-Hop Singles & Tracks and reached number 11 on the Hot Rap Singles. It reached number six on the UK single charts in March 2000. The song was nominated at the 2000 Grammy Awards for Best Rap Performance by a Duo or Group, but lost to The Roots and Erykah Badu's "You Got Me".

"Forgot About Dre" was released as the second single in 2000 and like the previous single, it was a hit on multiple charts. It reached number 25 on the Billboard Hot 100, number 14 on the Hot R&B/Hip-Hop Singles & Tracks and number 3 on the Rhythmic Top 40. It reached number seven on the UK single charts in June 2000. The accompanying music video won the MTV Video Music Award for Best Rap Video in 2000. The song won Dr. Dre and Eminem Best Rap Performance by a Duo or Group at the 2001 Grammy Awards.

"The Next Episode" was released as the third and final single in 2000. It peaked at number 23 on the Billboard Hot 100, number 11 on the Hot R&B/Hip-Hop Singles & Tracks and number 2 on the Rhythmic Top 40. It peaked at number three on UK single charts in February 2001. It was nominated at the 2001 Grammy Awards for Best Rap Performance by a Duo or Group, but the award went to another single from the same album to Dr. Dre and Eminem for "Forgot About Dre".

== Critical reception ==
Professional ratings
Review scores
Source	Rating
AllMusic	4/5 stars
Encyclopedia of Popular Music	4/5 stars
Entertainment Weekly	A−
Los Angeles Times	3.5/4 stars
NME	6/10
Q	3/5 stars
The Rolling Stone Album Guide	4/5 stars
The Source	4.5/5 stars
Spin	7/10
XXL	5/5

2001 received acclaim from critics. Stephen Thomas Erlewine of AllMusic stated, "2001 isn't as consistent or striking as Slim Shady, but the music is always brimming with character." Entertainment Weekly's Tom Sinclair praised the production, calling it "uncharacteristically sparse sound" from Dr. Dre and that it was as "addictive as it was back when over 3 million record buyers got hooked on The Chronic and Snoop Dogg's Dre-produced Doggystyle" and went on to commend Dr. Dre, stating, "If any rap producer deserves the title "composer", it's he." NME mentioned that Dr. Dre didn't expand the genre, but it was "powerful enough in parts, but not clever enough to give Will Smith the fear". PopMatters writer Chris Massey declared that "Musically, 2001 is about as close to brilliant as anyone gangsta rap album might possibly get." Christopher John Farley of Time stated that "The beats are fresh and involving, and Dre's collaborations with Eminem and Snoop Dogg have ferocity and wit." Although he was ambivalent towards the album's subject matter and guest rappers, Greg Tate of Spin was pleasantly surprised by "the most memorable MC'ing on this album com[ing] from Dre himself, Eminem notwithstanding" and stated, "Whatever one's opinion of the sexual politics and gun lust of Dre's canon, his ongoing commitment to formal excellence and sonic innovation in this art form may one day earn him a place next to George Clinton, if not Stevie Wonder, Duke Ellington, or Miles Davis."

In a negative review, Robert Christgau from The Village Voice found Dr. Dre's lyrics distastefully misogynistic, writing "It's a New Millennium, but he's Still S.L.I.M.E. ... For an hour, with time out for some memorable Eminem tracks, Dre degrades women every way he can think of, all of which involve his dick." Erlewine spoke of how the number of guest rappers affected the album and questioned his reasons for collaborating with "pedestrian rappers". He claimed that "the album suffers considerably as a result [of these collaborations]". Erlewine criticized the lyrics, which he said were repetitive and full of "gangsta clichés". Sinclair mentioned similar views of the lyrics, calling them "filthy", but noted "none of [this] should diminish Dre's achievement". NME spoke of how the lyrics were too explicit, stating, "As the graphic grooves stretch out, littered with gunfire, bombings and 'copters over Compton, and the bitch-beating baton is handed from Knock-Turnal to Kurupt, 2001 reaches gangsta-rap parody-level with too many tracks coming off like porno-Wu outtakes." Massey referred to the lyrics as a "caricature of an ethos [rather] than a reflection of any true prevailing beliefs."

In 2006, Hip Hop Connection ranked 2001 number 10 on its list of the 100 Best Albums (1995–2005) in hip hop. In a 2007 issue, XXL gave the album a retrospective rating of "XXL", their maximum score. In Rolling Stone's The Immortals – The Greatest Artists of All Time, where Dr. Dre was listed at number 54, Kanye West talked of how the track "Xxplosive" inspired him: "'Xxplosive', off 2001, that's [where] I got my entire sound from—if you listen to the track, it's got a soul beat, but it's done with those heavy Dre drums. Listen to 'This Can't Be Life,' a track I did for Jay-Z's Dynasty album, and then listen to 'Xxplosive'. It's a direct bite."

== Commercial performance ==
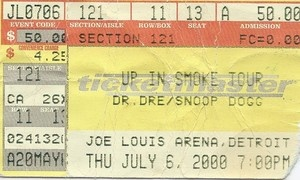
A July 6, 2000 Detroit concert ticket from the Up in Smoke Tour.

The nu-metal band Korn kept Dr. Dre from hitting number 1 in America's Billboard 200 with their album Issues, which sold 575,000 copies in its first week. As a result, the album debuted at number 2 on the chart, with first-week sales of 516,000 copies. It also entered at number one on Billboard's Top R&B/Hip-Hop Albums chart. The album was successful in Canada, where it reached number 2 on the charts. The record was mildly successful in Europe, reaching number 4 in the United Kingdom, number 7 in Ireland, number 15 in France, number 17 in the Netherlands and number 26 in Norway. It peaked at number 11 on the New Zealand album chart. Closing out the year 2000, the album was number 5 on the Billboard Top Albums and number one on the Billboard Top R&B/Hip-Hop Albums chart. It re-entered the charts in 2003, peaking on the UK Albums Top 75 at number 61 and on the Ireland Albums Top 75 at number 30. The album was certified six times Platinum by the Recording Industry Association of America (RIAA) on November 21, 2000. It is Dr. Dre's best selling album; his previous album, The Chronic, was certified three times Platinum. As of August 2015, the album has sold 7,800,000 copies in the United States.

== Track listing ==
Credits adapted from liner notes. All songs produced by Dr. Dre and Mel-Man, except for "The Message" which is produced by Lord Finesse.

No.	Title	Writer(s)	Length
1.	"Lolo (Intro)" (featuring Xzibit and Tray Deee)		0:41
2.	"The Watcher"	Andre Young; Marshall Mathers	3:26
3.	"Fuck You (censored as F*** You in the edited version)" (featuring Devin the Dude and Snoop Dogg)	Young; Brian Bailey; Devin Copeland; Calvin Broadus	3:25
4.	"Still D.R.E." (featuring Snoop Dogg)	Young; Melvin Bradford; Shawn Carter; Scott Storch	4:30
5.	"Big Ego's" (featuring Hittman)	Young; Bailey; Bradford; Storch; Tracy Curry; Richard Bembery	3:58
6.	"Xxplosive" (featuring Hittman, Kurupt, Nate Dogg, and Six-Two)	Young; Bailey; Ricardo Brown; Craig Longmiles; Nathaniel Hale; Chris Taylor	3:35
7.	"What's the Difference" (featuring Eminem and Xzibit)	Bradford; Alvin Joiner; Mathers; Bembery; Stefan Harris	4:04
8.	"Bar One (Skit)" (featuring Traci Nelson, Ms. Roq, and Eddie Griffin)		0:50
9.	"Light Speed" (featuring Hittman)	Young; Bailey; Brown	2:41
10.	"Forgot About Dre" (featuring Eminem)	Mathers	3:42
11.	"The Next Episode" (featuring Snoop Dogg)	Young; Brown; Bailey; Bradford; Broadus; Hale; Brown	2:41
12.	"Let's Get High" (featuring Hittman, Kurupt, and Ms. Roq)	Young; Bailey; Mathers; Brown; Racquel Weaver	2:27
13.	"Bitch Niggaz (censored as Bi*** Ni**az in the edited version)" (featuring Snoop Dogg, Hittman, and Six-Two)	Young; Bailey; Bradford; Broadus; Longmiles	4:13
14.	"The Car Bomb (Skit)" (featuring Mel-Man and Charis Henry)		1:00
15.	"Murder Ink" (featuring Hittman and Ms. Roq)	Young; Bailey; Weaver	2:28
16.	"Ed-Ucation" (featuring Eddie Griffin)		1:32
17.	"Some L.A. Niggaz" (featuring Defari, Xzibit, Knoc-turn'al, Time Bomb, King T, MC Ren, and Kokane)	Young; Bailey; Joiner; Duane Johnson, Jr.; Royal Harbor; Marquese Holder; Roger McBride	4:25
18.	"Pause 4 Porno (Skit)" (featuring Jake Steed)		1:32
19.	"Housewife" (featuring Kurupt and Hittman)	Young; Bailey; Bradford; Brown; Curry	4:02
20.	"Ackrite" (featuring Hittman)	Young; Bailey; Bradford	3:39
21.	"Bang Bang" (featuring Knoc-turn'al and Hittman)	Young; Bailey; Mathers; Harbor	3:42
22.	"The Message" (featuring Mary J. Blige and Rell)	Ryan Montgomery; Robert Hall, Jr.; Crystal Johnson	5:04
23.	"Outro" (spoken by Tommy Chong)		0:25
Total length:			68:00

Notes

- "The Watcher" contains additional vocals from Eminem and Knoc-Turn'al.
- "Still D.R.E" was written by Jay-Z.
- "What's the Difference" contains additional vocals from Phish. (Not to be confused with the popular rock band Phish)
- "The Next Episode" contains additional vocals from Kurupt and Nate Dogg.
- "Still D.R.E" transitions into "Big Ego's".
- "Bitch Niggaz" transitions into "The Car Bomb".
- "The Car Bomb" transitions into "Murder Ink".
- "Some L.A. Niggaz" transitions into "Pause 4 Porno".
- "The Message" transitions into the outro.
- "Some L.A. Niggaz" contains uncredited vocals from Hittman.
- "Housewife" is also featured on Kurupt's album, Tha Streetz Iz a Mutha.

Sample credits

- "Lolo (Intro)" contains a sample of "Deep Note" by James A. Moorer.
- "Big Ego's" contains samples of "Theme from The Persuaders!" by John Barry and "Love Don't Live Here Anymore" by Rose Royce.
- "Xxplosive" contains a sample of "Bumpy's Lament" by Soul Mann & the Brothers and interpolates "Ain't No Fun (If the Homies Can't Have None)" by Snoop Dogg.
- "What's the Difference" contains a sample of "Parce Que Tu Crois" by Charles Aznavour.
- "Bar One (Skit)" contains a sample of "Poundin'" by Cannonball Adderley.
- "Light Speed" contains a sample of "I'm Still #1" by Boogie Down Productions.
- "Forgot About Dre" contains a sample of "The Climb" by No Doubt.
- "The Next Episode" contains replayed elements of "The Edge" by David McCallum.
- "Let's Get High" contains samples of "Backstrokin'" by The Fatback Band and "High" by Skyy.
- "Bitch Niggaz" contains a sample of "Top Billin'" by Audio Two.
- "The Car Bomb (Skit)" contains a sample of "Time Is Passing" by Sun.
- "Murder Ink" contains samples of "Halloween Theme" by John Carpenter and "Here Comes the Hotstepper" by Ini Kamoze.
- "Ed-Ucation" contains samples of "Diamonds Are Forever" by Franck Pourcel.
- "Housewife" interpolates "Bitches Ain't Shit" by Dr. Dre.

== Personnel ==
- Dr. Dre – executive producer, performer, producer, drums, mixer
- Mel-Man – performer, producer, bass
- Lord Finesse – producer
- Eminem – performer, vocals, writer
- Snoop Dogg – performer, vocals
- Hittman – performer, writer
- Xzibit – performer
- Kurupt – performer, vocals
- Ms. Roq – performer
- Devin the Dude – performer, vocals
- Nate Dogg – performer
- Six-Two – performer
- Royce da 5'9" – writer
- MC Ren – vocals
- Tommy Chong – vocals
- Knoc-turn'al – performer, vocals
- Defari – performer
- Time Bomb – performer
- King Tee – performer
- Kokane – performer
- Mary J. Blige – performer
- Rell – performer
- Jake Steed – performer
- Eddie Griffin – performer
- Charis Henry – collage concept, performer
- The D.O.C. – writer, vocals
- Ian Sanchez – performer
- Colin Wolfe – bass
- Mike Elizondo – bass
- Preston Crump – bass
- Sean Cruse – guitar
- Camara Kambon – keyboards
- Scott Storch – keyboards
- Jason Hann – percussion
- Taku Hirano – percussion
- DJ Pen – scratches
- Larry Chatman – production manager
- Kirdis G. Tucker – Aftermath product manager
- Charles "Big Chuck" Stanton – A&R director
- Mike Lynn – A&R director
- Damon "Bing" Chatman – Aftermath project coordinator
- Michelle Thomas – Interscope product manager
- Andrew Van Meter – Interscope production coordinator
- Ekaterina Kenney – Interscope photo shoot coordinator
- Richard "Segal" Huredia – collage photographer, engineer
- Brian "Big Bass" Gardner – mastering
- Paul Foley – album editor
- Stan Musilik – photographer
- Donn Thompson – photographer
- Jason Clark – art director, designer
- Jay-Z – writer
- Crystal Johnson – writer

== Charts ==
=== Weekly charts ===
Weekly chart performance for 2001
Chart (1999–2000)	Peak position
Australian Albums (ARIA)	26
Australian Urban Albums (ARIA)	4
Belgian Albums (Ultratop Flanders)	13
Belgian Albums (Ultratop Wallonia)	36
Canadian Albums (Billboard)	3
Canadian R&B Albums (Nielsen SoundScan)	1
Dutch Albums (Album Top 100)	17
French Albums (SNEP)	15
German Albums (Offizielle Top 100)	20
Irish Albums (IRMA)	7
New Zealand Albums (RMNZ)	11
Norwegian Albums (VG-lista)	26
Scottish Albums (Official Charts)	7
Swiss Albums (Schweizer Hitparade)	36
UK Albums (Official Charts)	4
UK R&B Albums (Official Charts)	1
US Billboard 200	2
US Top Catalog Albums (Billboard)	32
US Top R&B/Hip-Hop Albums (Billboard)	1

2022 weekly chart performance for 2001
Chart (2022)	Peak position
Danish Albums (Hitlisten)	40
Finnish Albums (Suomen virallinen lista)	27
Swiss Albums (Schweizer Hitparade)	26

2025 weekly chart performance for 2001
Chart (2025)	Peak position
Hungarian Physical Albums (MAHASZ)	20

=== Year-end charts ===
2000 year-end chart performance for 2001
Chart (2000)	Position
Belgian Albums (Ultratop Flanders)	28
Canadian Albums (Nielsen SoundScan)	11
Dutch Albums (Album Top 100)	30
European Albums (Music & Media)	34
French Albums (SNEP)	41
German Albums (Offizielle Top 100)	45
New Zealand Albums (RMNZ)	19
UK Albums (OCC)	39
US Billboard 200	5
US Top R&B/Hip-Hop Albums (Billboard)	1

2001 year-end chart performance for 2001
Chart (2001)	Position
Canadian R&B Albums (Nielsen SoundScan)	71
Canadian Rap Albums (Nielsen SoundScan)	34
French Albums (SNEP)	91
UK Albums (OCC)	66
US Billboard 200	154

2019 year-end chart performance for 2001
Chart (2019)	Position
Belgian Albums (Ultratop Flanders)	119

2020 year-end chart performance for 2001
Chart (2020)	Position
Belgian Albums (Ultratop Flanders)	117

2021 year-end chart performance for 2001
Chart (2021)	Position
Belgian Albums (Ultratop Flanders)	124

2022 year-end chart performance for 2001
Chart (2022)	Position
Australian Albums (ARIA)	71
Belgian Albums (Ultratop Flanders)	83
Belgian Albums (Ultratop Wallonia)	169
Danish Albums (Hitlisten)	96
Swiss Albums (Schweizer Hitparade)	78
US Billboard 200	135
US Top R&B/Hip-Hop Albums (Billboard)	92

2023 year-end chart performance for 2001
Chart (2023)	Position
Australian Albums (ARIA)	88
Belgian Albums (Ultratop Flanders)	89
Belgian Albums (Ultratop Wallonia)	161
New Zealand Albums (RMNZ)	29
Swiss Albums (Schweizer Hitparade)	55
US Billboard 200	191

2024 year-end chart performance for 2001
Chart (2024)	Position
Australian Albums (ARIA)	98
Belgian Albums (Ultratop Flanders)	104
Belgian Albums (Ultratop Wallonia)	185
Swiss Albums (Schweizer Hitparade)	62

2025 year-end chart performance for 2001
Chart (2025)	Position
Belgian Albums (Ultratop Flanders)	138
Swiss Albums (Schweizer Hitparade)	79

=== Decade-end charts ===
Decade-end chart performance for 2001
Chart (2000s)	Position
US Billboard 200	17
US Top R&B/Hip-Hop Albums (Billboard)	1

== Certifications ==
Certifications for 2001
Region	Certification	Certified units/sales
Australia (ARIA)	4× Platinum	280,000^{‡}
Belgium (BRMA)	Gold	25,000^{*}
Canada (Music Canada)	5× Platinum	500,000^{^}
Denmark (IFPI Danmark)	3× Platinum	60,000^{‡}
France (SNEP)	2× Gold	200,000^{*}
Germany (BVMI)	Gold	150,000^{^}
Italy (FIMI) sales since 2009	Platinum	50,000^{‡}
Netherlands (NVPI)	Gold	50,000^{^}
New Zealand (RMNZ)	6× Platinum	90,000^{‡}
Switzerland (IFPI Switzerland)	Gold	25,000^{^}
United Kingdom (BPI)	5× Platinum	1,500,000^{‡}
United States (RIAA)	6× Platinum	7,800,000
Summaries
Europe (IFPI)	2× Platinum	2,000,000^{*}
^{*} Sales figures based on certification alone.^{^} Shipments figures based on certification alone.^{‡} Sales+streaming figures based on certification alone.

== See also ==
- List of number-one R&B albums of 1999 (U.S.)
- List of number-one R&B albums of 2000 (U.S.)
- Billboard Year-End
