= The Real Slim Shady =

2000 single by Eminem

Single by Eminem

from the album The Marshall Mathers LP
- Released: April 18, 2000
- Genre: Comedy hip hop
- Length: 4:44
- Label: Aftermath; Interscope; Web
- Songwriters: Marshall Mathers; Andre Young; Tommy Coster; Melvin Bradford; Mike Elizondo
- Producers: Dr. Dre; Mel-Man

Eminem singles chronology
"Forgot About Dre" (2000)	"The Real Slim Shady" (2000)	"The Way I Am" (2000)

Music Videos
- "The Real Slim Shady" (Clean Version) on YouTube
- "The Real Slim Shady" (Explicit Version) on YouTube

Audio Sample
- "The Real Slim Shady": file; help

"The Real Slim Shady" is a song by American rapper Eminem from his third studio album The Marshall Mathers LP (2000). It was released as the lead single a month before the album's release.

The song peaked at number four on the Billboard Hot 100, giving him his biggest hit up to that point. It was also Eminem's first song to reach number one in the UK and Ireland, and the song was the 14th best-selling of 2000 in the UK. It won multiple awards, including MTV Video Music Awards for Best Video and Best Male Video, as well as a Grammy Award for Best Rap Solo Performance. In October 2011, NME placed it at number 80 on its list "150 Best Tracks of the Past 15 Years". It was listed at number 396 on NME's 500 greatest songs of all time.

== Production ==
"The Real Slim Shady" was not originally intended to be part of The Marshall Mathers LP. Jimmy Iovine of Interscope Records wanted Eminem to create a song to introduce the album, similar to how "My Name Is" was the first single on The Slim Shady LP. Eminem, Dr. Dre, Tommy Coster, and Mike Elizondo wrote "The Real Slim Shady" only hours before the final copy of the album was due. The first single was intended to be "Who Knew".

The song's first verse interpolated the 1999 novelty single "Lonely Swedish (The Bum Bum Song)" by Tom Green, and the intro and chorus of the song interpolate the famous catchphrase "will the real _____ please stand up?" from the television game show To Tell the Truth.

== Critical reception ==
PopMatters described the song as "slamming their 'enemies' with comic book intensity", while also noting its ironic themes surrounding the number of near-identical "wannabes" due to Eminem's overall appearance, citing his "signature style" which bore "bleached blond hair, pale skin, [and] humongous T-shirt". AllMusic highlighted the single.

Rolling Stone expressed the sound of the single as "slick, bright, melodic funk that's so R&B-ish, you can dance to it". Will Hermes wrote in Entertainment Weekly, "In the aftermath of Slim Shady, he married the girlfriend he imagined killing, while his mother, immortalized in his hit single 'My Name Is' (I just found out my Mom does more dope than I do), sued him for $10 million for defamation of character." The defamation case was settled in 2001 for $25,000 as Debbie Mathers' former attorney was awarded $23,354—netting Ms. Mathers just over $1,600 for her efforts.

The Los Angeles Times favored The Real Slim Shady as a "modest step to the mainstream—a fresh and funny, almost PG-rated swipe at everything from the Grammy Awards to shallow teen pop", while IGN wrote:

"The album's obligatory 'pop' number is exposed on 'The Real Slim Shady,' which chugs and lurches along to a boinging electro funk beat. It would be a total pop smash if it weren't for the lyrics, though. Leave it to Em to juice it up with ear candy effervescent, but keep the words in the subversive. As with the other Dre crafted tunes on the album, there's plenty of cool special effects bustling about—fart noises, heavy breathing, all of it coalescing with Em's cartoon character on crystal meth delivery. Sure it's pop, but of the most demented nature."

The song has been included as part of many films, notably 21 Jump Street (2012) and Freddy Got Fingered (2001). Ironically, Tom Green, who was criticized in the song, stars in Freddy Got Fingered.

== Music video ==
Philip G. Atwell and Dr. Dre directed the music video, filmed from April 7 to 10, 2000. Eminem's friends and former group-mates from D12, including rappers Denaun Porter, Proof, Swifty McVay, Bizarre, Kuniva, and Limp Bizkit vocalist Fred Durst, are featured in the video along with him.

Actress and comedian Kathy Griffin, notable for insulting celebrities in her act, appears in the video as an attending nurse in a psychiatric ward. Griffin said during a July 21, 2005, interview on The Tonight Show with Jay Leno that Eminem selected her for the video because fellow rapper Snoop Dogg told him she was "really funny".

The car featured in the music video is a blue 1978 AMC Pacer coupe. The car is doing doughnuts on a parking lot with its hatchback partially open. It is part of the message in The Real Slim Shady's climactic lines, showing petty acts of rebellion that include teenagers going senselessly round a parking lot and spitting on fast food.

== Credits ==
Information from the interior booklet of The Marshall Mathers LP

- Singing and lyrics: Eminem
- Production: Dr. Dre, Mel-Man
- Mixing: Dr. Dre
- Bass guitar – Mike Elizondo
- Keyboards – Tommy Coster
- Editing – Dan Lebental
- Executive producer – Dr. Dre
- Composer – Andre Young, Marshall Mathers, Tommy Coster, Melvin Bradford, Mike Elizondo

== Awards ==
"The Real Slim Shady" was successful at the 2000 MTV Video Music Awards, winning for Video of the Year and Best Male Video, as well as being a nominee for Best Rap Video, Best Direction, Best Editing, and Viewer's Choice. The song was also performed by Eminem at the show with look-a-likes of himself, as in the video.

Awards and nominations received by or for "The Real Slim Shady"
Year	Organization	Award	Result
2000	Billboard Music Awards	Maximum Vision Video	Won
2000	Billboard Music Awards	Best Rap/Hip-Hop Clip of the Year	Won
2000	Teen Choice Awards	Choice Music: Video	Nominated
2000	Teen Choice Awards	Choice Music: Summer Song	Nominated
2000	MTV Video Music Awards	Video of the Year	Won
2000	MTV Video Music Awards	Best Male Video	Won
2000	MTV Video Music Awards	Best Rap Video	Nominated
2000	MTV Video Music Awards	Best Direction	Nominated
2000	MTV Video Music Awards	Best Editing	Nominated
2000	MTV Video Music Awards	Viewer's Choice Award	Nominated
2001	Detroit Music Awards	Outstanding National Single	Won
2001	Grammy Awards	Best Rap Solo Performance	Won

== Track listing ==
UK CD single
No.	Title	Writer(s)	Producer(s)	Length
1.	"The Real Slim Shady"	Marshall Mathers; Andre Young; Melvin Bradford; Tommy Coster; Mike Elizondo	Dr. Dre; Mel-Man	4:44
2.	"The Real Slim Shady" (instrumental)	Marshall Mathers; Andre Young; Melvin Bradford; Tommy Coster; Mike Elizondo	Dr. Dre; Mel-Man	4:44
3.	"Guilty Conscience" (radio version with new hook; featuring Dr. Dre)	Mathers; Young	Dr. Dre; Eminem^{[a]}	3:19
4.	"The Real Slim Shady" (video)			4:44

UK cassette
No.	Title	Writer(s)	Producer(s)	Length
1.	"The Real Slim Shady"	Marshall Mathers; Andre Young Melvin Bradford; Tommy Coster; Mike Elizondo	Dr. Dre; Mel-Man	4:44
2.	"My Fault" (pizza mix)	Marshall Mathers; Jeffrey Bass; Mark Bass	Bass Brothers; Eminem	3:53
Total length:				8:37

German CD single
No.	Title	Writer(s)	Producer(s)	Length
1.	"The Real Slim Shady"	Marshall Mathers; Andre Young; Melvin Bradford; Tommy Coster; Mike Elizondo	Dr. Dre; Mel-Man	4:44
2.	"Bad Influence"	Marshall Mathers; Jeffrey Bass; Mark Bass	Bass Brothers	3:40
Total length:				8:24

German Maxi CD single
No.	Title	Writer(s)	Producer(s)	Length
1.	"The Real Slim Shady"	Marshall Mathers; Andre Young; Melvin Bradford; Tommy Coster; Mike Elizondo	Dr. Dre; Mel-Man	4:44
2.	"Bad Influence"	Marshall Mathers; Jeffrey Bass; Mark Bass	Bass Brothers	3:40
3.	"The Real Slim Shady" (instrumental)	Marshall Mathers; Andre Young; Melvin Bradford; Tommy Coster; Mike Elizondo	Dr. Dre; Mel-Man	4:44
4.	"My Fault" (pizza mix)	Marshall Mathers; Jeffrey Bass; Mark Bass	Bass Brothers; Eminem	3:53
5.	"Just Don't Give a F**k" (music video)			4:39
Total length:				21:40

== Charts ==
=== Weekly charts ===
2000 weekly chart performance for "The Real Slim Shady"
Chart (2000)	Peak position
Australia (ARIA)	11
Austria (Ö3 Austria Top 40)	6
Belgium (Ultratop 50 Flanders)	7
Belgium (Ultratop 50 Wallonia)	2
Brazil (ABPD)	39
Canada (RPM)	6
Denmark (Tracklisten)	3
Eurochart Hot 100 (Billboard)	1
Finland (Suomen virallinen lista)	6
France (SNEP)	6
Germany (GfK)	7
Iceland (Íslenski Listinn Topp 40)	1
Ireland (IRMA)	1
Italy (FIMI)	4
Netherlands (Dutch Top 40)	5
Netherlands (Single Top 100)	5
New Zealand (RIANZ)	15
Norway (VG-lista)	2
Poland Airplay (Music & Media)	13
Portugal (AFP)	2
Romania (Romanian Top 100)	8
Scottish Singles Sales (Official Charts)	1
Spain (AFYVE)	6
Sweden (Sverigetopplistan)	3
Switzerland (Schweizer Hitparade)	2
UK Singles (Official Charts)	1
UK Hip Hop/R&B (Official Charts)	1
US Billboard Hot 100	4
US Alternative Airplay (Billboard)	19
US Hot R&B/Hip-Hop Songs (Billboard)	11
US Pop Airplay (Billboard)	13
US Hot Rap Songs (Billboard)	7
US Rhythmic Airplay (Billboard)	1

2021 weekly chart performance for "The Real Slim Shady"
Chart (2021)	Peak position
Canada Digital Song Sales (Billboard)	20

2022 weekly chart performance for "The Real Slim Shady"
Chart (2022)	Peak position
Global 200 (Billboard)	59
Czech Republic Singles Digital (ČNS IFPI)	67
Lithuania (AGATA)	86

2023 weekly chart performance for "The Real Slim Shady"
Chart (2023)	Peak position
Poland (Polish Streaming Top 100)	94
Slovakia Singles Digital (ČNS IFPI)	58

=== Year-end charts ===
2000 year-end chart performance for "The Real Slim Shady"
Chart (2000)	Position
Australian Singles Chart	57
Austrian Singles Chart	18
Belgian (Flanders) Singles Chart	30
Belgian (Wallonia) Singles Chart	10
Danish Singles Chart	29
Dutch Top 40	44
Dutch Single Top 100	39
European Singles Chart	10
French Singles Chart	16
German Singles Chart	44
Romania (Romanian Top 100)	60
Swedish Singles Chart	22
Swiss Singles Chart	5
UK Singles (Official Charts Company)	14
UK Urban (Music Week)	17
US Billboard Hot 100	51

2022 year-end chart performance for "The Real Slim Shady"
Chart (2022)	Position
Australia (ARIA)	75
Global 200 (Billboard)	117
Lithuania (AGATA)	71

== Certifications ==
Certifications and sales for "The Real Slim Shady"
Region	Certification	Certified units/sales
Australia (ARIA)	11× Platinum	770,000^{‡}
Austria (IFPI Austria)	Gold	25,000^{*}
Belgium (BRMA)	Platinum	50,000^{*}
Brazil (Pro-Música Brasil)	3× Platinum	180,000^{‡}
Canada (Music Canada)	2× Platinum	160,000^{*}
Denmark (IFPI Danmark)	2× Platinum	180,000^{‡}
France (SNEP)	Gold	250,000^{*}
Germany (BVMI)	3× Gold	900,000^{‡}
Italy (FIMI) sales since 2009	2× Platinum	200,000^{‡}
New Zealand (RMNZ)	7× Platinum	210,000^{‡}
Norway (IFPI Norway)	Gold	
Portugal (AFP)	4× Platinum	40,000^{‡}
Spain (Promusicae)	Platinum	60,000^{‡}
Sweden (GLF)	Platinum	30,000^{^}
Switzerland (IFPI Switzerland)	Gold	25,000^{^}
United Kingdom (BPI)	4× Platinum	2,400,000^{‡}
United States (RIAA)	7× Platinum	7,000,000^{‡}
Streaming
Greece (IFPI Greece)	Gold	1,000,000^{†}
^{*} Sales figures based on certification alone.^{^} Shipments figures based on certification alone.^{‡} Sales+streaming figures based on certification alone.^{†} Streaming-only figures based on certification alone.

== See also ==
- Grammy Award for Best Rap Solo Performance
- List of artists who reached number one on the U.S. Rhythmic chart
- List of number-one singles of 2000 (Ireland)
- List of European number-one hits of 2000
- List of UK Singles Chart number ones of the 2000s
- List of highest-certified singles in Australia
