= Kill You =

2000 single by Eminem

Promotional single by Eminem

from the album The Marshall Mathers LP
- Released: 2001
- Recorded: November 1999
- Genre: Horrorcore
- Length: 4:24
- Label: Aftermath; Interscope; Web
- Songwriters: Marshall Mathers; Andre Young; Melvin Bradford
- Producers: Dr. Dre; Mel-Man

Audio sample
- file; help

"Kill You" is a song by American rapper Eminem from his third album The Marshall Mathers LP (2000). It was released as a promotional single from the album in 2001, and was featured on the deluxe edition of his 2005 greatest hits album, Curtain Call: The Hits. The song peaked at #2 on the Bubbling Under R&B/Hip-Hop Singles chart.

== Background ==
"Kill You" discusses the controversy that surrounded Eminem's first album, nightmares of "ladies' screams", and being raised by a single mother. In the song, Eminem also talks of raping his mother, and "notes the irony of magazines trumpeting his mother-raping self on their covers'." The song was written when Eminem heard the track playing in the background while talking to Dr. Dre on the phone and developed an interest in using it for a song. He then wrote the lyrics at home and met up with Dr. Dre and the two recorded the song together.

The song was listed as "**** You" on the back cover of the censored version of the album.

== Controversies ==
At a United States Senate hearing, Lynne Cheney criticized Eminem and sponsor Seagram for "promot[ing] violence of the most degrading kind against women", labeling him as "a rap singer who advocates murder and rape". She specifically cited lyrics from "Kill You", explaining, "He talks about murdering and raping his mother. He talks about choking women slowly so he can hear their screams for a long time. He talks about using O.J.'s machete on women, and this is a man who is honored by the recording industry".

On October 26, 2000, Eminem was to perform at a concert in Toronto's SkyDome. However, Ontario Attorney General Jim Flaherty argued that Canada should stop Eminem at the border. "I personally don't want anyone coming to Canada who will come here and advocate violence against women", he said. Flaherty claims to have been "disgusted" when reading transcriptions of "Kill You", which includes lines like "Slut, you think I won't choke no whore/till the vocal cords don't work in her throat no more?" Eminem's fans argued that this was a matter of free speech and that he was unfairly singled out. Eminem was later granted entry into Canada.

In 2002, French jazz pianist Jacques Loussier filed a $10 million lawsuit against Eminem and Dr. Dre, claiming the beat for "Kill You" was stolen from his song "Pulsion". He unsuccessfully demanded that all sales of the album be halted and any remaining copies destroyed. The lawsuit was settled out-of-court.

== Track listing ==
Japanese CD single

No.	Title	Writer(s)	Producer(s)	Length
1.	"Kill You (clean version)"	Marshall Mathers; Andre Young; Melvin Bradford	Dr. Dre; Mel-Man	4:24
2.	"Kill You (dirty version)"	Marshall Mathers; Andre Young; Melvin Bradford	Dr. Dre; Mel-Man	4:24
3.	"Sh!t on You (clean version)" (D12 song)	Marshall Mathers; Denaun Porter; Von Carlisle; Ondre Moore; Rufus Johnson; DeShaun Holton; Kevin Bell	Eminem; DJ Head^{[a]}	5:27
4.	"Shit on You (dirty version)" (D12 song)	Marshall Mathers; Denaun Porter; Von Carlisle; Ondre Moore; Rufus Johnson; DeShaun Holton; Kevin Bell	Eminem; DJ Head^{[a]}	5:27
Total length:				19:42

Notes

- ^{^[a]} signifies a co-producer.

== Certifications ==
Region	Certification	Certified units/sales
Australia (ARIA)	Platinum	70,000^{‡}
New Zealand (RMNZ)	Platinum	30,000^{‡}
United Kingdom (BPI)	Gold	400,000^{‡}
United States (RIAA)	Gold	500,000^{‡}
^{‡} Sales+streaming figures based on certification alone.

== Personnel ==
Credits adapted from the album's liner notes and Tidal

- Eminem – vocals
- Dr. Dre – mixing and production
- Richard "Segal" Huredia – engineering
- Mike Elizondo – bass
- Mel-Man – production
- Jim McCrone – engineering assistance
- Thomas Coster Jr. – keyboards
- Sean Cruse – guitar
