= Still D.R.E. =

1999 single by Dr. Dre featuring Snoop Dogg

Single by Dr. Dre featuring Snoop Dogg

from the album 2001
- B-side: "The Next Episode"; "The Message"
- Released: September 28, 1999
- Recorded: 1999
- Studio: A&M (Hollywood); Record One (Los Angeles)
- Genre: West Coast hip-hop; gangsta rap; G-funk
- Length: 4:34
- Label: Aftermath; Interscope
- Songwriters: Andre Young; Shawn Carter; Melvin Bradford; Scott Storch
- Producers: Dr. Dre; Mel-Man

Dr. Dre singles chronology
"Guilty Conscience" (1999)	"Still D.R.E." (1999)	"Forgot About Dre" (2000)

Snoop Dogg singles chronology
"Down for My N's" (1999)	"Still D.R.E." (1999)	"The Next Episode" (2000)

Audio sample
- file; help

Music video
- "Still D.R.E." on YouTube

"Still D.R.E." is a song by American rapper and producer Dr. Dre featuring American rapper Snoop Dogg. It was released on September 28, 1999, as the lead single from Dre's multi-platinum second studio album, 2001 (1999). The single debuted and peaked at number 93 on the Billboard Hot 100 in 1999 before re-entering and peaking at number 23 in 2022. It was more successful in the United Kingdom, where it reached number 6. The song has been performed live numerous times by both Dr. Dre and Snoop Dogg. Notable performances include the 2000 Up in Smoke Tour and as the final song in the Super Bowl LVI halftime show on February 13, 2022, alongside Eminem, Mary J. Blige, Kendrick Lamar and 50 Cent, with Anderson .Paak on drums.

== Background ==
Dr. Dre released his highly acclaimed debut solo album The Chronic in 1992. After this, Dre went seven years without releasing an album. During this time he featured on the Billboard Hot 100 chart-toppers "California Love" and "No Diggity", while also producing Snoop Dogg and Eminem's debut studio albums Doggystyle and The Slim Shady LP, respectively. The stakes were higher for the sequel to The Chronic, so Dre recruited Jay-Z to ghostwrite lyrics for the former's comeback single, "Still D.R.E.". "At first, he wrote about diamonds and Bentleys," Dre told Blaze magazine in 1999. "So I told Jay to write some other shit. Jigga sat for 20 minutes and came back with some hard-ass, around-the-way L.A. shit." In an interview on The Breakfast Club, Snoop Dogg elaborated on Jay-Z's contributions on the song. "He wrote Dre’s shit and my shit and it was flawless," he said. "It was 'Still D.R.E.' and it was Jay-Z and he wrote the whole fucking song." An alternate reference track was also written by The D.O.C..

"Still D.R.E." was the final song written and recorded for 2001. Dr. Dre originally wanted to release "The Next Episode" as the album's first single: however, despite considering it a "great song" this idea was vetoed by Jimmy Iovine, who "felt the album needed something coming out from a different way", leading to the creation of "Still D.R.E." during a late-night session at A&M Studios. Scott Storch first came up with the song's keyboard melody, before Mel-Man then added the drum patterns and Dr. Dre made further adjustments; Iovine then joined them in the studio and expressed his approval with the song.

== Music video ==
The music video, directed by Hype Williams, consists mainly of The D.O.C., Snoop Dogg and Dre driving and riding in lowrider cars (a reference to the "Nuthin' but a 'G' Thang" music video from The Chronic album). It features several cameos: Eminem chasing a group of women across a beach, Xzibit driving a lowrider, Funkmaster Flex with Dre, and Warren G riding with several women. In the background the individual throwing up the W with the crowd next to Snoop Dogg and Dre right next to the lowrider car was Coldhard from the Chicago-based rap group Crucial Conflict. The music video was released for the week ending on October 3, 1999. The video performance was officially uploaded via Vevo to Dre's YouTube Channel on 27 October 2011.

The music video hit one billion YouTube views in February 2022.

== Performances ==
Dr. Dre and Snoop Dogg performed the song on the Up in Smoke Tour, which was later released on DVD. They also performed the song at the Super Bowl LVI halftime show on February 13, 2022, alongside Eminem, Mary J. Blige, Kendrick Lamar and 50 Cent, with Anderson .Paak on drums.

Anderson .Paak, Dr. Dre, and Sheila E. performed the song on January 30, 2025, at Kia Forum in Inglewood, California, for FireAid to help with relief efforts for the January 2025 Southern California wildfires.

== Track listing ==
UK CD single #1

No.	Title	Writer(s)	Producer(s)	Length
1.	"Still D.R.E (featuring Snoop Dogg)"	Andre Young; Melvin Bradford; Scott Storch; Shawn Carter	Dr. Dre; Mel-Man	4:34
2.	"The Next Episode" (featuring Snoop Dogg)	Young; Bradford; Ricardo Brown; Brian Bailey; Melvin Breeden; Calvin Broadus Jr.	Dr. Dre; Mel-Man	2:42
3.	"Still D.R.E." ((Instrumental))	Young; Bradford; Storch; Carter	Dr. Dre; Mel-Man	4:34
4.	"Still D.R.E." (music video) (explicit)	Young; Bradford; Storch; Carter	Dr. Dre; Mel-Man
Total length:				11:10

UK CD single #2

No.	Title	Writer(s)	Producer(s)	Length
1.	"Still D.R.E." (radio edit)	Andre Young; Melvin Bradford; Scott Storch; Shawn Carter	Dr. Dre; Mel-Man	3:54
2.	"The Message" (featuring Mary J. Blige and Rell)	Ryan Montgomery; Robert Hall Jr.	Lord Finesse	4:13
3.	"Still D.R.E." (instrumental)	Young; Bradford; Storch; Carter	Dr. Dre; Mel-Man	4:34
4.	"Still D.R.E." (music video) (clean)	Young; Bradford; Storch; Carter	Dr. Dre; Mel-Man
Total length:				12:01

12-inch vinyl

No.	Title	Writer(s)	Producer(s)	Length
1.	"Still D.R.E."	Andre Young; Melvin Bradford; Scott Storch; Shawn Carter	Dr. Dre; Mel-Man; Scott Storch	4:34
2.	"Still D.R.E." (radio edit)	Young; Bradford; Storch; Carter	Dr. Dre; Mel-Man	4:34
3.	"Still D.R.E." (instrumental)	Young; Bradford; Storch; Carter	Dr. Dre; Mel-Man	4:34
4.	"Still D.R.E." (acapella)	Young; Bradford; Storch; Carter	Dr. Dre; Mel-Man	4:34
Total length:				16:56

== Charts ==
Chart (1999–2000)	Peak position
France (SNEP)	29
Ireland (IRMA)	14
Scottish Singles Sales (Official Charts)	10
UK Singles (Official Charts)	6
UK Hip Hop/R&B (Official Charts)	1
US Billboard Hot 100	93
US Hot R&B/Hip-Hop Songs (Billboard)	32
US Hot Rap Songs (Billboard)	11
US Rhythmic Airplay (Billboard)	29

Chart (2011)	Peak position
France (SNEP)	96

Chart (2012)	Peak position
France (SNEP)	103

Chart (2013)	Peak position
France (SNEP)	77

Chart (2022)	Peak position
Austria (Ö3 Austria Top 40)	34
Canada Hot 100 (Billboard)	11
Germany (GfK)	38
Global 200 (Billboard)	16
Hungary (Single Top 40)	12
Lithuania (AGATA)	90
New Zealand (Recorded Music NZ)	21
Portugal (AFP)	101
South Africa Streaming (TOSAC)	79
Sweden (Sverigetopplistan)	67
Switzerland (Schweizer Hitparade)	15
US Billboard Hot 100	23
US Hot R&B/Hip-Hop Songs (Billboard)	6

=== Year-end charts ===
Chart (2000)	Position
UK Urban (Music Week)	30

== Certifications ==
Region	Certification	Certified units/sales
Austria (IFPI Austria)	Platinum	50,000^{*}
Brazil (Pro-Música Brasil)	Platinum	60,000^{‡}
Denmark (IFPI Danmark)	2× Platinum	180,000^{‡}
Germany (BVMI)	3× Gold	750,000^{‡}
Italy (FIMI)	Platinum	50,000^{‡}
New Zealand (RMNZ)	7× Platinum	210,000^{‡}
Portugal (AFP)	Platinum	40,000^{‡}
United Kingdom (BPI)	4× Platinum	2,400,000^{‡}
Streaming
Denmark (IFPI Danmark)	Gold	1,300,000^{†}
Greece (IFPI Greece)	Gold	1,000,000^{†}
^{*} Sales figures based on certification alone.^{‡} Sales+streaming figures based on certification alone.^{†} Streaming-only figures based on certification alone.
