= What's the Difference =

Song by Dr. Dre featuring Eminem and Xzibit

Song by Dr. Dre featuring Eminem and Xzibit

from the album 2001
- Released: November 16, 1999
- Recorded: 1999
- Studio: Larrabee (Hollywood)
- Genre: Hip hop
- Length: 4:04
- Label: Aftermath; Interscope
- Songwriters: Andre Young; Melvin Bradford; Alvin Joiner; Marshall Mathers; Richard Bembery; Stefan Harris; Charles Aznavour
- Producers: Dr. Dre; Mel-Man

"What's the Difference" is a song by American rapper Dr. Dre from his second studio album 2001 (1999). It features American rappers Eminem and Xzibit, and was produced by Dre and Mel-Man.

== Background ==
An early version of "What's the Difference" features a verse from Hittman in place of Xzibit's. However, Hittman felt the song was better suited for inclusion on Eminem's album The Marshall Mathers LP (2000) and that a song called "Blaaow" should appear on 2001 instead; he requested that Dr. Dre remove his verse from "What's the Difference" to make clear which song he preferred. "Blaaow" (also featuring fellow Aftermath member Knoc-turn'al) was later released on Hittman's 2005 album Hittmanic Verses under the title "Bloww".

== Composition ==
The song is in the key of B minor and contains a horn section in the instrumental, as well as a sample of "Parce Que Tu Crois" by Charles Aznavour. Lyrically, the rappers talk about the differences between themselves and other rappers. Dr. Dre reflects on three of his friends, Ice Cube, The D.O.C., and Eazy-E in his verse. Eminem's verse begins with him and Dr. Dre sharing a moment to appreciate one another's friendship and the strength of their bond. It then sees him considering the hypothetical situation of killing his then wife, Kim Scott, rapping that he would put sunglasses on her corpse and drive around with her in the front seat before personally dropping her off at a police station, rather than simply dropping her corpse into the ocean as Dr. Dre suggests. This is a reference to the famous movie Weekend at Bernie's, in which the character Bernie is driven around in a topless car with sunglasses on postmortem. He also defends Dre's legacy, threatening those who doubt him.

== Critical reception ==
Roger Morton of NME praised Eminem's feature, describing him as "cutting through particularly effectively" on the track. Frank Williams of The Source called the song the highlight of 2001. Jackson Howard of The Ringer also praised Eminem's verse, which he described as "mesmerizing, equal parts performance art, battle rap, storytelling, and raw charisma".

== Live performances ==
Dr. Dre, Eminem, and Xzibit performed the song live on March 16, 2000 at MTV Spring Break.

== Charts ==
Chart (2000)	Peak position
US Hot R&B/Hip-Hop Songs (Billboard)	76

== Certifications ==
Region	Certification	Certified units/sales
Austria (IFPI Austria)	Gold	15,000^{*}
Germany (BVMI)	Gold	300,000^{‡}
New Zealand (RMNZ)	2× Platinum	60,000^{‡}
United Kingdom (BPI)	Platinum	600,000^{‡}
^{*} Sales figures based on certification alone.^{‡} Sales+streaming figures based on certification alone.
