= Xxplosive =

Song by Dr. Dre featuring Hittman, Kurupt, Nate Dogg and Six-Two

from the album 2001
- Released: 1999
- Recorded: 1999
- Genre: West Coast hip hop; gangsta rap; G-funk
- Length: 3:37 (original, explicit version); 2:50 (radio edit)
- Label: Aftermath; Interscope
- Songwriters: Andre Young; Brian Bailey; Nathaniel Hale; Ricardo Brown; Craig Longmiles; Isaac Hayes
- Producers: Dr. Dre; Mel-Man

"Xxplosive" is a song by American rapper-producer Dr. Dre from his second studio album 2001 (1999). It features Kurupt, Nate Dogg, and Six-Two in the verses and Hittman singing the chorus. The song was released as a promo single, backed with "Fuck You".

In the clean version, Kurupt's verse is skipped due to how many explicit words there are.

== Background ==
The instrumental for "Xxplosive" was originally made for rapper King T to be used on his debut Aftermath album The Kingdom Come, which saw its release delayed for several years until King T had left the label. It was also offered to LL Cool J, who recorded vocals for the track but ultimately turned it down, as "it just didn't quite work, it wasn't right".

== Attribution controversy ==
In a 2012 interview with AllHipHop, former Dr. Dre collaborator Chris Taylor claimed to have helped create the production for "Xxplosive" and that Dr. Dre had not credited him for his contribution. Taylor alleged to have taken legal action after Dr. Dre failed to pay him the basic $1,500 fee for his work on the track; although Taylor still did not receive any official credit, he claimed the dispute forced Dr. Dre to properly credit co-producer Mel-Man for his production work on 2001.

== Legacy ==
In his profile of Dr. Dre for Rolling Stone's 2005 list "The Immortals: The Greatest Artists of All Time", Kanye West claimed to have "got his entire sound" from "Xxplosive", admitting to have directly copied the drums for his production of the Jay-Z song "This Can't Be Life". West had previously referenced this on his 2004 song "Last Call".

== Charts ==
Chart (2000)	Peak position
US Hot R&B/Hip-Hop Songs (Billboard)	51

== Certifications ==
Certification for "Xxplosive"
Region	Certification	Certified units/sales
New Zealand (RMNZ)	2× Platinum	60,000^{‡}
United Kingdom (BPI)	Silver	200,000^{‡}
^{‡} Sales+streaming figures based on certification alone.
