= The Home & Home Tour =

2010 concert tour by Jay-Z and Eminem

- National tour by Eminem and Jay-Z
- The official logo of the tour
- Location: U.S., North America
- Associated albums: Recovery; The Blueprint 3
- Start date: September 2, 2010
- End date: September 14, 2010
- No. of shows: 4
Eminem tour chronology
The Recovery Tour (2010–2013)	The Home & Home Tour (2010)	Rapture Tour (2014)
Jay-Z tour chronology
Jay-Z Fall Tour (2009–10)	The Home & Home Tour (2010)	Watch the Throne Tour (2011–2012)

The Home & Home Tour was a tour by American rappers Jay-Z and Eminem. The tour comprised two shows at Comerica Park in Detroit, Michigan, and two shows in Yankee Stadium, New York City. The audio of Eminem's performance in Detroit has been released by the rapper's radio station Shade 45.

== Background ==
In early May 2010, Jay-Z and Eminem attended a baseball game between The Detroit Tigers and New York Yankees, where they announced they would be co-headlining shows at both teams respective Stadiums, and their respective hometowns. The tour originally contained only two dates (one in New York and one in Detroit), but the band added two more dates after tickets sold out for both those shows the first day they were on sale It was later announced in August that rapper B.o.B would be opening for the duo on all the dates of the mini tour, and that he would also be bringing along collaborator Playboy Tre. G-Unit artist Tony Yayo, confirmed that he and longtime Eminem protege 50 Cent were backstage at the rehearsal for the first Detroit show, and hinted that they might be guests on the tour.

== Performances ==
On September 2, during the first show in Comerica Park, guests for Jay-Z included Memphis Bleek, Bridget Kelly, and Young Jeezy. Numerous guests were brought out for Eminem's set, including Shady Records recording artists 50 Cent, D 12, and The Alchemist. Other guests on Eminem's set included Trick Trick, G-Unit, and Drake. Longtime Eminem mentor Dr. Dre, donning a shirt that said, "R.I.P. Proof," also made a surprise appearance, and performed some songs with longtime Aftermath protégés Eminem and 50 Cent. On September 3, the same guests featured at last nights concert re-appeared with the exception of Drake. Pop star Lady Gaga, director Shawn Levy, rapper, and longtime friend of Eminem, Royce da 5'9", singer Akon and singer Michael Bivins of New Edition each attended the performance as spectators.

On September 13, the tour continued in Yankee Stadium. During the show, Jay-Z brought out numerous guests including his wife and singer Beyoncé, long time collaborators Kanye West, Rihanna, Chris Martin of Coldplay, Swizz Beatz, Drake, Nicki Minaj, Memphis Bleek, Bridget Kelly. On the final September 14 show, the same guests re-appeared with the exception of Chris Martin and additionally, Mary J. Blige performed as a surprise guest. Eminem brought out many of the same guests from the Comerica Park set on both days. On all four nights, tribute was paid by Jay-Z to Notorious B.I.G by playing Notorious B.I.G.'s hits "Juicy" and "One More Chance". Roc Nation artist J. Cole joined B.o.B in opening both nights in New York City Yankee Stadium shows. Hip-hop pioneer DJ Kool Herc was invited by Jay-Z to the show, appeared in the audience, and came on stage where Jay-Z honored the legend and stated "We wouldn't be here without you."

== Locations ==
Date	City	Country	Venue
North America
September 2, 2010	Detroit	United States	Comerica Park
September 3, 2010	Detroit	United States	Comerica Park
September 13, 2010	New York City	United States	Yankee Stadium
September 14, 2010	New York City	United States	Yankee Stadium

== Setlists ==
Eminem

1. "Won't Back Down"
2. "3 a.m."
3. "Square Dance"
4. "W.T.P."
5. "Kill You"
6. "Welcome 2 Detroit" (with Trick-Trick)
7. "No Love"
8. "So Bad"
9. "Cleanin' Out My Closet"
10. "The Way I Am"
11. "Fight Music" (with D12)
12. "Purple Pills" (with D12)
13. "My Band" (with D12)
14. "Airplanes" (with B.o.B)
15. "Stan"
16. "Sing for the Moment"
17. "Like Toy Soldiers"
18. "Forever" (with Drake)
19. "Patiently Waiting" (with 50 Cent)
20. "I Get Money" (with G-Unit)
21. "Beamer, Benz, or Bentley" (with G-Unit)
22. "In da Club" (with G-Unit)
23. "'Till I Collapse"
24. "Cinderella Man"
25. "Love the Way You Lie"
26. "Renegade" (with Jay-Z)
27. "My Name Is"
28. "The Next Episode"
29. "Still D.R.E." (with Dr. Dre)
30. "Nuthin' but a 'G' Thang" (with Dr. Dre)
31. "Crack a Bottle"
32. "The Real Slim Shady"
33. "Without Me"
34. "Not Afraid"
35. "Lose Yourself" (encore)

Jay-Z

1. "Young Forever" (with Beyoncé)
2. "Run This Town" (with Kanye West and Rihanna)
3. "Power Remix" (with Kanye West)
4. "Monster" (with Kanye West and Nicki Minaj)
5. "Can't Tell Me Nothing" (with Kanye West)
6. "Good Life" (with Kanye West)
7. "On to the Next One" (with Swizz Beatz)
8. "D.O.A. (Death of Auto-Tune)"
9. "Free Mason"
10. "Renegade" (with Eminem)
11. "Takeover"
12. "U Don't Know"
13. "99 Problems"
14. "Nigga What, Nigga Who (Originator 99)"
15. "Big Pimpin'"
16. "Hard Knock Life (Ghetto Anthem)"
17. "One More Chance" (The Notorious B.I.G. tribute)
18. "Juicy" (The Notorious B.I.G. tribute)
19. "A Dream"
20. "PSA"
21. "Ain't No Love" (with Chris Martin)
22. "Most Kings/Viva la Vida" (with Chris Martin)
23. "Miss Me" (with Drake)
24. "Light Up" (with Drake)
25. "Already Home"
26. "Empire State of Mind" (with Bridget Kelly)
27. "Thank You"
28. "Jigga My Nigga"
29. "Izzo (H.O.V.A.)"
30. "The Best of Me"
31. "Where I'm From"
32. "Dirt off Your Shoulder"
33. "I Just Wanna Love U (Give It 2 Me)"
34. "Numb/Encore"
