= Curtain Call 2 =

Greatest hits album by Eminem
- Released: August 5, 2022
- Recorded: 2005–2022
- Genres: Hip-hop; hardcore hip-hop; horrorcore; comedy hip-hop; pop rap
- Length: 154:58
- Labels: Shady; Goliath; Aftermath; Interscope
- Producers: Eminem; Dr. Dre; Luis Resto; Jeff Bass; DVLP; DJ Khalil; D.A. Got That Dope; Just Blaze; Rick Rubin; Ricky Racks

Eminem chronology
| Music to Be Murdered By (2020) | Curtain Call 2 (2022) | The Death of Slim Shady (Coup de Grâce) (2024) |

Singles from Curtain Call 2
- 1. "The King and I" Released: June 16, 2022; 2. "From the D 2 the LBC" Released: June 24, 2022; 3. "Is This Love ('09) (Italy only)" Released: September 30, 2022

Curtain Call 2 is the second greatest hits album by the American rapper Eminem, released on August 5, 2022, by Shady Records, Goliath Artists, Aftermath Entertainment, and Interscope Records. A double album, it is a successor of his previous greatest hits album, Curtain Call: The Hits, which was issued in 2005. The compilation covers the most recent years of Eminem's career, since his return to music from his hiatus, starting from the release of Relapse in 2009. The album also includes three new songs: "From the D 2 the LBC" featuring Snoop Dogg, "Is This Love ('09)" featuring 50 Cent, and "The King and I" featuring CeeLo Green, which was previously featured on the Elvis soundtrack.

Along with The Eminem Show: 20th Anniversary Edition, it received nomination for an Outstanding Anthology/Compilation/Reissue at the 2023 Detroit Music Awards, but lost to Alice Cooper's Live From The Astroturf: Good Records Dallas, Texas 10/06/1. Both of its singles, "The King & I" and "From the D 2 the LBC", were nominated for an Outstanding National Single, but lost to Lizzo's "About Damn Time".

== Background and promotion ==
Curtain Call 2 was first hinted at by Eminem in a tweet promoting the single "From the D 2 the LBC" on June 24, 2022, in which he included a hashtag with the album's name. Eminem officially announced the album and its release date via social media on July 11. On July 19, the album was made available for preorder through Eminem's website along with several merch bundles and limited edition vinyl. On August 2, the album's track listing was unveiled.

== Cover art ==
On July 11, 2022, Eminem revealed the album's cover art on Twitter. The artwork emulates classic pinball machine backglass artwork and contains many hidden Easter eggs as well as references to his previous albums. Some of the references include a fighter jet from Kamikaze and Eminem's childhood home from The Marshall Mathers LP 2, and Eminem in a graveyard holding a shovel from Music to Be Murdered By. Eminem himself is shown in the middle, holding up the sign of the horns. This rendition of Eminem is an edit or tracing of a photo from The Marshall Mathers LP 2 photoshoot. This cover also shares resemblance to Sugar Ray's Floored album cover.

== Critical reception ==
Professional ratings
Aggregate scores
| Source | Rating |
|---|---|
| Metacritic | 74/100 |
Review scores
| Source | Rating |
| AllMusic | 4.5/5 stars |
| Clash | 5/10 |
| Pitchfork | 6.2/10 |
| RapReviews | 6.5/10 |

According to the review aggregator Metacritic, Curtain Call 2 received "generally favorable reviews" based on a weighted average score of 74 out of 100 from 4 critic scores.

AllMusic's Stephen Thomas Erlewine praised the album, saying that it is "generous to a fault, playing like an endless streaming playlist instead of a curated compilation, yet it does feature many highlights from Eminem's mid-career records". Grant Jones of RapReviews wrote: "The 'Eminem sound' the first Curtain Call could accurately collate and celebrate (given 100% of it was produced by either Dre or Em) has been pushed aside in favor of party trick flows and quick-win hooks from guests. It still seems to be a successful approach, but it's not as satisfying to revisit". Drew Millard of Pitchfork stated: "despite showcasing some of Eminem's stylistic growing pains, Curtain Call 2 isn't completely lined with duds". In his mixed review, Robin Murray of Clash wrote: "Curtain Call 2 is at its most engaging when the Detroit figure simply cuts back on the Billboard tie-ins, and reminds us all why he became such a revered rapper in the first place. ... As a project, however, Curtain Call 2 is weighed down by its flaws. There's no ignoring the wayward path Eminem has taken over the past two decades, and the tracklisting reflects this".

== Commercial performance ==
The album debuted at number six on the US Billboard 200, earning 43,000 album-equivalent units in its first week. Curtain Call 2 was the best-selling album of the week in pure sales, with 18,000 copies sold. It also debuted at number three on the UK Albums Chart. The album has moved a total of 700,000 album-equivalent units as of October 26, 2022, including 32,900 pure album sales, 132,100 song sales, 830 million audio-on-demand streams, and 130 million video-on-demand streams according to Hits Daily Double. As of November 30, 2022 Curtain Call 2 was the twenty-ninth best-selling album of the year according to Hits. Still according to the magazine, Curtain Call 2 has moved a total of 827,000 album-equivalent units by the end of 2022, including 39,000 pure album sales, 142,000 song sales, 995 million audio-on-demand streams, and 151 million video-on-demand streams.

== Track listing ==
Disc 1
| No. | Title | Original release | Length |
|---|---|---|---|
| 1. | "Godzilla" (featuring Juice Wrld) | Music to Be Murdered By | 3:30 |
| 2. | "Lucky You" (featuring Joyner Lucas) | Kamikaze | 4:06 |
| 3. | "Lighters" (Bad Meets Evil featuring Bruno Mars) | Hell: The Sequel | 5:03 |
| 4. | "Gnat" | Music to Be Murdered By – Side B | 3:50 |
| 5. | "Cinderella Man" | Recovery | 4:39 |
| 6. | "Walk on Water" (Curtain Call 2 version; featuring Beyoncé) | Revival | 4:57 |
| 7. | "Rap God" | The Marshall Mathers LP 2 | 6:03 |
| 8. | "Love the Way You Lie" (featuring Rihanna) | Recovery | 4:23 |
| 9. | "Won't Back Down" (featuring Pink) | Recovery | 4:25 |
| 10. | "Higher" | Music to Be Murdered By – Side B | 3:43 |
| 11. | "Berzerk" | The Marshall Mathers LP 2 | 3:57 |
| 12. | "Not Afraid" | Recovery | 4:09 |
| 13. | "From the D 2 the LBC" (with Snoop Dogg) | Previously unreleased | 3:33 |
| 14. | "Nowhere Fast" (featuring Kehlani) | Revival | 4:24 |
| 15. | "Fall" | Kamikaze | 4:22 |
| 16. | "Phenomenal" | Southpaw (Music from and Inspired by the Motion Picture) | 4:41 |
| 17. | "Fast Lane" (Bad Meets Evil) | Hell: The Sequel | 4:09 |
| 18. | "You're Never Over" | Recovery | 5:05 |
| Total length: | | | 79:13 |

Disc 2
| No. | Title | Original release | Length |
|---|---|---|---|
| 1. | "3 a.m." | Relapse | 5:19 |
| 2. | "Space Bound" | Recovery | 4:38 |
| 3. | "Beautiful" | Relapse | 6:32 |
| 4. | "The Monster" (featuring Rihanna) | The Marshall Mathers LP 2 | 4:10 |
| 5. | "Venom" | Kamikaze | 4:24 |
| 6. | "Crack a Bottle" (featuring Dr. Dre and 50 Cent) | Relapse | 4:57 |
| 7. | "Is This Love ('09)" (with 50 Cent) | Previously unreleased | 3:32 |
| 8. | "River" (featuring Ed Sheeran) | Revival | 3:43 |
| 9. | "Survival" | The Marshall Mathers LP 2 | 4:31 |
| 10. | "Best Friend" (Yelawolf featuring Eminem) | Love Story | 5:10 |
| 11. | "Darkness" | Music to Be Murdered By | 5:38 |
| 12. | "Kings Never Die" (featuring Gwen Stefani) | Southpaw (Music from and Inspired by the Motion Picture) | 4:57 |
| 13. | "No Love" (featuring Lil Wayne) | Recovery | 4:59 |
| 14. | "Headlights" (featuring Nate Ruess) | The Marshall Mathers LP 2 | 5:43 |
| 15. | "The King and I" (featuring CeeLo Green) | Elvis (Original Motion Picture Soundtrack) | 3:12 |
| 16. | "Farewell" | Music to Be Murdered By | 4:12 |
| Total length: | | | 75:45 |

Digital edition bonus track
| No. | Title | Original release | Length |
|---|---|---|---|
| 17. | "Rap God" (Mr. Cii remix) | The Marshall Mathers LP 2 | 6:15 |
| Total length: | | | 82:00 |

Vinyl edition
| No. | Title | Original release | Length |
|---|---|---|---|
| 1. | "Godzilla" (featuring Juice Wrld) | Music to Be Murdered By | 3:30 |
| 2. | "Crack a Bottle" (featuring Dr. Dre and 50 Cent) | Relapse | 4:57 |
| 3. | "Walk on Water" (Curtain Call 2 version; featuring Beyoncé) | Revival | 5:04 |
| 4. | "Gnat" | Music to Be Murdered By – Side B | 3:44 |
| 5. | "Space Bound" | Recovery | 4:38 |
| 6. | "Love the Way You Lie" (featuring Rihanna) | Recovery | 4:23 |
| 7. | "Rap God" | The Marshall Mathers LP 2 | 6:03 |
| 8. | "No Love" (featuring Lil Wayne) | Recovery | 5:00 |
| 9. | "From the D 2 the LBC" (featuring Snoop Dogg) | Previously unreleased | 3:35 |
| 10. | "River" (featuring Ed Sheeran) | Revival | 3:41 |
| 11. | "Not Afraid" | Recovery | 4:10 |
| 12. | "Venom" | Kamikaze | 4:29 |
| 13. | "Lighters" (Bad Meets Evil) | Hell: The Sequel | 5:03 |
| 14. | "Survival" | The Marshall Mathers LP 2 | 4:32 |
| 15. | "Higher" | Music to Be Murdered By – Side B | 3:42 |
| 16. | "The Monster" (featuring Rihanna) | The Marshall Mathers LP 2 | 4:10 |
| 17. | "Lucky You" (featuring Joyner Lucas) | Kamikaze | 4:04 |
| 18. | "Is This Love ('09)" (featuring 50 Cent) | Previously unreleased | 3:32 |
| 19. | "Berzerk" | The Marshall Mathers LP 2 | 3:58 |
| 20. | "Beautiful" | Relapse | 6:32 |

== Charts ==
=== Weekly charts ===
Weekly chart performance for Curtain Call 2
| Chart (2022) | Peak position |
|---|---|
| Australian Albums (ARIA) | 2 |
| Austrian Albums (Ö3 Austria) | 11 |
| Belgian Albums (Ultratop Flanders) | 15 |
| Belgian Albums (Ultratop Wallonia) | 26 |
| Canadian Albums (Billboard) | 3 |
| Dutch Albums (Album Top 100) | 13 |
| French Albums (SNEP) | 16 |
| German Albums (Offizielle Top 100) | 9 |
| Hungarian Albums (MAHASZ) | 38 |
| Irish Albums (Official Charts) | 8 |
| Italian Albums (FIMI) | 55 |
| Japanese Digital Albums (Oricon) | 26 |
| Japanese Hot Albums (Billboard Japan) | 97 |
| New Zealand Albums (RMNZ) | 5 |
| Norwegian Albums (VG-lista) | 21 |
| Polish Albums (ZPAV) | 19 |
| Portuguese Albums (AFP) | 32 |
| Scottish Albums (Official Charts) | 3 |
| Swiss Albums (Schweizer Hitparade) | 8 |
| UK Albums (Official Charts) | 3 |
| UK R&B Albums (Official Charts) | 1 |
| US Billboard 200 | 6 |
| US Top Album Sales (Billboard) | 1 |
| US Top R&B/Hip-Hop Albums (Billboard) | 3 |

=== Year-end charts ===
2022 year-end chart performance for Curtain Call 2
| Chart (2022) | Position |
|---|---|
| Australian Albums (ARIA) | 66 |
| US Billboard 200 | 178 |
| US Top R&B/Hip-Hop Albums (Billboard) | 59 |

2023 year-end chart performance for Curtain Call 2
| Chart (2023) | Position |
|---|---|
| Australian Albums (ARIA) | 33 |
| Canadian Albums (Billboard) | 19 |
| French Albums (SNEP) | 103 |
| New Zealand Albums (RMNZ) | 23 |
| UK Albums (OCC) | 31 |
| US Billboard 200 | 113 |
| US Top R&B/Hip-Hop Albums (Billboard) | 40 |

2024 year-end chart performance for Curtain Call 2
| Chart (2024) | Position |
|---|---|
| Australian Albums (ARIA) | 72 |
| Australian Hip Hop/R&B Albums (ARIA) | 18 |
| New Zealand Albums (RMNZ) | 23 |
| UK Albums (OCC) | 33 |
| US Top R&B/Hip-Hop Albums (Billboard) | 89 |

2025 year-end chart performance for Curtain Call 2
| Chart (2025) | Position |
|---|---|
| UK Albums (OCC) | 53 |

== Certifications ==
Certifications for Curtain Call 2
| Region | Certification | Certified units/sales |
|---|---|---|
| France (SNEP) | Gold | 50,000^{‡} |
| New Zealand (RMNZ) | 3× Platinum | 45,000^{‡} |
| United Kingdom (BPI) | 2× Platinum | 600,000^{‡} |
^{‡} Sales+streaming figures based on certification alone.
