= Cinderella Man (disambiguation) =

Cinderella Man is a 2005 American film about American boxer James J. Braddock.

Cinderella Man may also refer to:

- Cinderella Man (Rush song), a song by the Canadian rock band Rush on the A Farewell to Kings album
- Cinderella Man (Eminem song), song by the American rap singer Eminem on the Recovery album
- Cinderella Man (TV series), a South Korean television drama
- "Cinderella Man", the nickname of American boxer James J. Braddock
- The Cinderella Man (1917), an American comedy film directed by George Loane Tucker
