= The King and I (song) =

Single by Eminem and CeeLo Green

from the album Elvis (Original Motion Picture Soundtrack) and Curtain Call 2
- Released: June 16, 2022
- Genre: Rap rock; blues rap; gangsta rap
- Length: 3:16
- Label: Shady; Aftermath; Interscope
- Songwriters: Marshall Mathers; Thomas Calloway; Andre Young; Luis Resto; Jerry Leiber; Mike Stoller
- Producer: Dr. Dre

Eminem singles chronology
"Last One Standing" (2021)	"The King and I" (2022)	"From the D 2 the LBC" (2022)

CeeLo Green singles chronology
"Love" (2022)	"The King and I" (2022)	"Falling" (2022)

"The King and I" (stylized as "The King & I") is a song by American rapper Eminem and American singer CeeLo Green. It was released on June 16, 2022, as the fourth single from the soundtrack to the Elvis Presley biopic film Elvis (2022). It was later included on Eminem's second greatest hits album, Curtain Call 2, through Shady Records, Aftermath Entertainment, and Interscope Records.

Along with "From the D 2 the LBC", the song received an Outstanding National Single nomination at the 2023 Detroit Music Awards, but lost to Lizzo's “About Damn Time”.

== Background ==
In an interview for KTLA, CeeLo Green spoke about the collaboration process, saying, "Me and Eminem have been friends for years; I've longed for an opportunity to work with him. He said, 'Hey man, can you do this for me? I need it really quickly, I need it tonight.' So when Eminem says he needs something tonight, you deliver."

== Composition ==
Produced by Dr. Dre and Eminem, the song samples Presley's "Jailhouse Rock", and showcases the two artists taking turns paying homage to Presley: "'Cause me and Elvis jailed together like cellmates / Yeah, this the jailhouse, bitch and I don’t give a..." raps Eminem, before being joined by Green on the hook: "Middle fingers up, we 'bout to do this shit again". Eminem also references and interpolates Presley's song "Blue Suede Shoes" in a similar way he did on his song "My 1st Single" from Encore. Eminem name-drops rappers 2 Chainz and Wiz Khalifa, and reflects on the critics who have hounded his career: "I stole Black music, yeah, true / (For what?) Perhaps used it as a tool to combat school kids". He also points out the parallels between him and Elvis in the music industry: "One, he’s pale as me / Second, we both been hailed as king / He used to rock the jailhouse and I used to rock The Shelter."

== Charts ==
Chart performance for "The King and I"
Chart (2022)	Peak position
Ireland (IRMA)	97
New Zealand Hot Singles (RMNZ)	15
UK Singles (Official Charts)	86

== Release history ==
Release history and formats for "The King and I"
Region	Date	Format	Label	Ref.
Various	June 16, 2022	Digital download; streaming	Aftermath; Shady; Interscope	
Italy	June 24, 2022	Contemporary hit radio	Universal	
