= No Love =

2010 single by Eminem featuring Lil Wayne

- German and Dutch cover art

Single by Eminem featuring Lil Wayne

from the album Recovery
- Released: October 5, 2010
- Recorded: September–November 2009
- Studio: 54 Sound, Effigy Studios (Ferndale, Michigan, U.S.)
- Genre: Hip hop
- Length: 4:59
- Label: Aftermath; Shady; Interscope
- Songwriters: Marshall Mathers; Dwayne Carter, Jr.; Justin Smith; Dee Dee Halligan; Junior Torello
- Producer: Just Blaze

Eminem singles chronology
"Love the Way You Lie" (2010)	"No Love" (2010)	"That's All She Wrote" (2011)

Lil Wayne singles chronology
"Right Above It" (2010)	"No Love" (2010)	"Fire Flame" (2010)

Music video
- "No Love" on YouTube

"No Love" is a song by American rapper Eminem featuring Lil Wayne. It was originally released on June 18, 2010 as a track from Eminem's seventh studio album Recovery, before being released as its third single from the album on October 5, 2010. The song was written by the artists alongside producer Just Blaze, with additional writing credits going to Dee Dee Halligan and Junior Torello for the sampling of "What Is Love" by Haddaway, featuring its chorus as the backing vocals. "No Love" reached number 23 on the Billboard Hot 100. It has sold more than a million digital downloads in the United States. It was ranked the 8th best song of 2010 by Complex.

The music video was directed by Chris Robinson. A teaser premiered on Eminem's YouTube channel on September 29, 2010. The video premiered September 30 and is about a boy who is bullied but eventually defends himself after being motivated by listening to Eminem and Lil Wayne songs. Various hip hop producers make cameo appearances in the video. The song was performed by Eminem and Lil Wayne during an episode of Saturday Night Live and on Eminem's and Jay-Z's The Home & Home Tour. In August 2022, "No Love" was featured on Eminem's second greatest hits album Curtain Call 2.

== Background ==
The song was recorded by Mike Strange and Ryan West in Effigy Studios in Ferndale, Michigan. The song was mixed by Eminem, Strange, West, and Just Blaze and was engineered by Joe Strange. The song samples "What Is Love" by Trinidadian-German singer Haddaway during the chorus, as well as sampling a sped up chord progression from the song in Eminem's parts. When the song begins, there is a thirty-second intro and the sampled words "no love" echo. On August 28, 2010, Billboard reported that "No Love" would be the third single from Recovery. The song impacted radio on October 5, 2010 and was released as the third single from Recovery. The full song is four minutes and fifty-nine seconds long.

== Development ==
Eminem spoke about how Lil Wayne got to collaborate with him. He stated that the song was Lil Wayne appearing on Eminem's album after Eminem did the song "Drop the World" that appeared on Lil Wayne's album Rebirth. "I did a song with Wayne called 'Drop the World' for his [Rebirth] album, and we had just agreed to do an even swap, so I wanted him on my album." Just Blaze also spoke about the making of the song. He spoke about using a sample in the song. He wanted to turn the simple elements of the Haddaway song and use them for "something you can actually rock to." At first, the schedules were not available for recording, but were eventually made. He also proposed to Eminem the use of samples for the chorus:

"I remembered that I had the idea with the Haddaway sample in my computer, so I threw on the headphones, touched it up, and played it for him. At first, he didn't get it hundred percent. I think he wasn't sure what I was going for because it's such a comic sample. But once I broke down the idea to him, another angle: 'I don't need you no more, don't want to see you no more, you get no love.' Then it clicked."

When Eminem understood the concept, he was willing to use it, and had recorded vocals two days later. Eminem later had a desire to collaborate with Lil Wayne. Blaze and Eminem flew to Miami and Wayne had apparently written and recorded his verse in one night. After returning to New York, they worked more on the hook. The song is about people who have let Eminem and Lil Wayne down in the past.

== Critical reception ==
Overall, "No Love" was met with positive reception. NME published an album review of Recovery and gave a positive opinion on the song. Writer Sam Wolfson said, "'No Love' sees Lil Wayne act as hype man for a whole two and a half minutes before Eminem comes in and drops one of the best verses of his career. It makes Wayne sound like Jedward-era Vanilla Ice." BBC Music favored the sampling in the song, quoting, "'No Love' brilliantly borrows its Eurodance tempo from Haddaway's massive 1993 hit 'What Is Love' and welcomes Lil Wayne for a splendidly languorous guest rap." guardian.co.uk gave a positive review on "No Love", with Kitty Empire quoting that it "pits a pinging Em in a friendly against Lil Wayne." John Matheessen from About.com named "No Love" as one of the four best tracks on Recovery. Winston Robbins of music website Consequence of Sound also favored the use of sampling in the song, and called it one of the best tracks of the album.

"'No Love' (feat. Lil' Wayne) is an instant hip-hop darling, first because this is a collaboration between two of the hottest MCs in the game, and second because it's a solid piece. It samples Haddaway's 'What Is Love', more commonly known as the song that Will Ferrell and Chris Kattan loved to bob their heads to on SNL, and seamlessly uses the sample and the chorus to produce an extremely impressive and highly listenable piece."

== Chart performance ==
"No Love" debuted on the Billboard Hot 100 at number 23 on July 10, 2010 after the release of his album Recovery and remained on the charts for 20 weeks. It re-entered the chart at number 89 after being released as a single; since then it has moved up to number 29. The song entered the Hot R&B/Hip-Hop Songs chart on November 27, 2010, peaking at the number 59 position. This was the song's lowest peak position. It lasted eight weeks on the chart. "No Love" peaked at number 42 on the Radio Songs, peaking on December 4 and lasting 11 weeks. The song also reached up to number 20 the Pop Songs chart at the beginning of 2011 and lasting 12 weeks. "No Love" did not reach its peak on the European Hot 100 until November 27, 2010, when it reached number 36, remaining for eight weeks. The song also charted on the Canadian Hot 100 for 20 weeks, peaking just one spot lower than it did on the Billboard Hot 100 on November 6.

"No Love" lasted eight weeks on the ARIA Charts, peaking at number 21. However, one of its highest peak positions on the charts was on the ARIA Urban Singles Chart, reaching at number 7. The same position was reached on the UK R&B Chart on November 20, 2011, lasting 20 weeks. In Denmark, "No Love" only lasted two weeks but peaked at number 36. The song, peaking at number 22 in New Zealand, lasted five weeks on the RIANZ Chart. The track has made BBC Radio 1's A-Playlist in the United Kingdom. The song has received over a million downloads in the United States alone.

The song's success and anti-bullying message has led to many covers and remixes from rappers and producers ranging from Busta Rhymes to Ruben King.

== Music video ==
=== Development ===
The music video was directed by American music video director Chris Robinson, who previously directed both Eminem and Lil Wayne in the "Drop the World" music video. The video began shooting in June 2010. A thirty-second teaser was released on September 29, 2010, on Eminem's official YouTube channel. It shows Eminem rapping inside of a recording studio, interlaced with scenes where an adolescent boy gets bullied. Some of the music video was shot in front of a green screen. Lil Wayne's part was filmed before he was incarcerated, according to a tweet from Eminem: "We got Wayne's verse filmed before he went away luckily. Gotta shoot the rest of a 'No Love' video real soon. Keep your head up Weezy!" The official music video premiered on Thursday, September 30 on VEVO and various MTV channels at 7:56 PM EST.

=== Synopsis and reception ===
Eminem as seen in front of a screen depicting monkey bars and other playground equipment. This still depicts the lyric, I ain't never giving in again, caution the wind complete freedom...

The "No Love" video begins with a boy that has a flashback to an occasion when he is forced to evade several dodgeballs from bullies. He has several flashbacks of himself being bullied while he is in his room. The second one of them is when he goes to his locker to get his things, the same bullies come and start beating him. Lil Wayne begins rapping at this point. The bullying flashback scenes are interlaced with Wayne rapping in a black, smoky room, which was filmed in front of a green screen. Meanwhile, Eminem walks into the studio with his lyric sheet, preparing for his recording session. He also joins behind Lil Wayne in the black room. The school boy encounters the bullies again in the school corridor, banging into them, but he simply walks off. While the boy daydreams, he listens to songs by Eminem and Lil Wayne in his earphones. The walls in his room are covered with posters of the two rappers, including a promotional poster of 8 Mile, a hip hop musical film that stars Eminem. In another flashback, he is encountered by the bullies in a restroom. The boy's hat is thrown into the toilet and his school items are thrown out. At this point, Eminem begins singing the chorus and the boy is beaten up and left crying. During the chorus, it has Eminem singing in front of images of school playground equipment (a basketball ring, monkey bars, etc.) and dark clouds on a screen behind him.

During the second verse, Eminem appears in a recording studio, rapping his verse in "No Love". American hip hop producers Just Blaze, The Alchemist and Denaun Porter make cameo appearances in the studio. When the boy arrives home from school, his parents see his injuries and begin arguing. The boy leaves to go skateboarding. After listening to Eminem and Lil Wayne, he is motivated and soon has the urge to stand up to the bullies. He arrives wearing a hoodie. At first the boy gets knocked down, but gets back up. At this moment, Eminem finishes his verse and starts singing the chorus. The scenario appears to play out in several ways where in one scene the boy appears to strike one of the bullies and then runs, only to be caught by them. In the next scene, he appears to be on top of one of the bullies and strikes him yet near the end it only appears he postures against the bullies and then walks away. Eminem also finishes his session and leaves to end the video.

Kelley L. Carter from MTV News said, "Bullies beware!" and that the video "sends a powerful message, in line with much of his latest album, Recovery." Simon Vozick-Levinson from Entertainment Weekly gave a similar opinion, quoting, "Bullied schoolkids of the world, take heart: You have two very powerful allies named Eminem and Lil Wayne." Website Hypebeast said that "the clip sets its focus on growing pains."

== Live performances ==
Eminem has performed "No Love" at The Home & Home Tour with American rapper Jay-Z. The duo performed the song at the Yankee Stadium in New York City on September 13, 2010, unaccompanied by Lil Wayne. Having performed the chorus and his own verse only, Eminem spoke about his feelings during the performance: "Do not think that I don't know where I'm at right now, I'm also honored to be on this stage in The Bronx, the birthplace of hip hop." The two artists performed the song on Saturday Night Live during December 18, 2010 in Lil Wayne's first major television appearance since his release from prison. Many profane lyrics were replaced while the rest were not said at all. They were accompanied by electric guitars, musical keyboards and drums. The stage was decorated with holiday themed decorations. As worded by Mawuse Ziegbe from MTV, "[Lil Wayne] spit the first verse with his signature unhinged energy, asserting his return to the live-television circuit. Em[inem] helmed the rest of the song, nimbly dropping his lyrics with abandon." Eminem wore a black jacket and a cap, while Lil Wayne wore a white T-shirt. The performance also included other songs by each of the artists, such as "6 Foot 7 Foot" performed by Lil Wayne and "Won't Back Down" performed by Eminem. DJ Scoob Doo described Wayne's performance: "The energy in the building is historical and it's extra special to see everybody fight for position backstage to see Lil Wayne take over SNL."

The song was performed in the 2011 Bonnaroo Music & Arts Festival by Eminem and his hypeman Mr. Porter. He wore a black Bad Meets Evil T-shirt and camouflage shorts. He also performed songs with Royce da 5'9". Lil Wayne was not present at the live performance, despite performing in the festival. The performance was widely praised. According to James Montgomery of MTV News, "It's the same renewed vigor Eminem has displayed on his most-recent efforts." Adam Grahan from The Detroit News said "Eminem injected the Bonnaroo Music and Arts Festival with a heavy dose of Detroit swagger on Saturday night." Magazine The Hollywood Reporter described the performance: "Eminem was in top form, fast and angry as he stalked the stage in long camouflage shorts and a black t-shirt." Eminem performed "No Love" without Lil Wayne at Lollapalooza 2011 in Chicago on August 6, 2011. The performance was widely praised by news reporters.

== Track listing ==
Digital download

No.	Title	Writer(s)	Producer(s)	Length
1.	"No Love"	Marshall Mathers; Dwayne Carter, Jr.; Justin Smith; Dee Dee Halligan; Junior Torello	Just Blaze	4:59
2.	"No Love" (music video) (final director's cut)	Mathers; Carter, Jr.; Smith; Halligan; Torello	Just Blaze	5:14
Total length:				10:13

German CD single

No.	Title	Writer(s)	Producer(s)	Length
1.	"No Love" (explicit)	Marshall Mathers; Dwayne Carter, Jr.; Justin Smith; Dee Dee Halligan; Junior Torello	Just Blaze	5:00
2.	"No Love" (clean)	Mathers; Carter, Jr.; Smith; Halligan; Torello	Just Blaze	5:00
Total length:				10:00

== Credits and personnel ==
- Eminem – songwriter, mixing
- Lil Wayne – songwriter
- Just Blaze – producer, mixing, songwriter
- Mike Strange – recording, mixing
- Joe Strange – assistant engineering
- Ryan West – recording, mixing
- Dee Dee Halligan – songwriter
- Junior Torello – songwriter

Sample credits

- Contains samples of "What Is Love" performed by Haddaway and written by Dee Dee Halligan and Junior Torello.

Credits and personnel adapted from the Recovery digital booklet.

== Charts ==
Chart performance for "No Love"
Chart (2010–2011)	Peak position
Australia (ARIA)	21
Australia Urban (ARIA)	7
Austria (Ö3 Austria Top 40)	26
Belgium (Ultratip Bubbling Under Flanders)	4
Belgium (Ultratip Bubbling Under Wallonia)	21
Brazil (ABPD)	56
Canada Hot 100 (Billboard)	24
Denmark (Tracklisten)	36
European Hot 100 Singles (Billboard)	36
Germany (GfK)	17
Ireland (IRMA)	31
Italy (FIMI)	85
New Zealand (Recorded Music NZ)	22
Poland (Video Chart)	3
Scottish Singles Sales (Official Charts)	35
Switzerland (Schweizer Hitparade)	39
UK Singles (Official Charts)	33
UK Hip Hop/R&B (Official Charts)	7
US Billboard Hot 100	23
US Hot R&B/Hip-Hop Songs (Billboard)	59
US Hot Rap Songs (Billboard)	9
US Pop Airplay (Billboard)	20
US Rhythmic Airplay (Billboard)	10

== Certifications ==
Certifications for "No Love"
Region	Certification	Certified units/sales
Australia (ARIA)	3× Platinum	210,000^{‡}
Austria (IFPI Austria)	Gold	15,000^{*}
Brazil (Pro-Música Brasil)	2× Platinum	120,000^{‡}
Denmark (IFPI Danmark)	Gold	45,000^{‡}
Germany (BVMI)	Gold	150,000^{‡}
New Zealand (RMNZ)	Platinum	30,000^{‡}
United Kingdom (BPI)	Platinum	600,000^{‡}
United States (RIAA)	5× Platinum	5,000,000^{‡}
^{*} Sales figures based on certification alone.^{‡} Sales+streaming figures based on certification alone.

== Release history ==
Release history and formats for "No Love"
Country	Date	Format
United States	October 5, 2010	Radio
United Kingdom	November 4, 2010	Digital download
Germany	November 5, 2010	CD single
United Kingdom	November 16, 2010	CD single
