= The Recovery Tour =

2010–13 concert tour by Eminem

- Tour by Eminem
- Location: North America; South America; Asia; Oceania; Europe
- Associated album: Recovery; Relapse; Hell: The Sequel
- Start date: July 9, 2010
- End date: August 25, 2013
- Legs: 8
- No. of shows: 25

Eminem concert chronology
- Anger Management Tour (2000–2005); The Recovery Tour (2010–2013); The Home & Home Tour (2010)

The Recovery Tour was a series of European concerts by American rapper Eminem, in support of his 2010 album Recovery as well as his 2009 album Relapse. Instead of widely touring the album, Eminem took the tour to three European festivals, performing to over 200,000 people over three nights. In November 2010, Eminem headlined the F1 Rocks 2010 in São Paulo. In the following year, another eight shows on festivals in North America and Europe were announced. The tour was also extended to three stadium shows in Australia that took place in December 2011.

== Background ==
Eminem had stated before the release of Relapse that he would not tour the album due to his daughter, Hailie, not liking him being away from home. However, on 23 February 2010, it was announced that Eminem would return to the live stage by headlining three major European festivals: T in the Park 2010 in Scotland, Oxegen 2010 in Ireland, and the Openair Festival in Frauenfeld, Switzerland. Eminem's website quoted him as saying: "I’m excited to get back to Europe to rock some shows. The crowds there are always big, crazy, and dedicated. It's going to be great to feel that energy again."

The official press release also revealed that Eminem would be joined by D12 on each of the dates. Another festival – the F1 Rocks 2010 – was added to the tour in fall of 2010.

== Opening acts ==
- Lil Wayne (Australia)
- Slaughterhouse (Asia) & (Europe) - Slane & Paris
- Kendrick Lamar (Europe) - Glasgow & Paris
- Yelawolf (Europe) - Slane & Glasgow
- Odd Future (Europe) - Slane, Glasgow & Paris
- Plan B (Europe) - Slane (Only)

== Tour dates ==
Date	City	Country	Venue	Attendance	Revenue
Europe
July 9, 2010	Frauenfeld	Switzerland	Open Air Festival	—N/a	—N/a
July 10, 2010	Balado	Scotland	T in the Park	—N/a	—N/a
July 11, 2010	County Kildare	Ireland	Oxegen	—N/a	—N/a
North America
September 25, 2010	Fontana	United States	Epicenter Festival	—N/a	—N/a
South America
November 5, 2010	São Paulo	Brazil	F1 Rocks	—N/a	—N/a
North America Leg #2
June 11, 2011	Manchester	United States	Bonnaroo Music Festival	—N/a	—N/a
July 29, 2011	Montreal	Canada	Osheaga Music and Arts Festival	—N/a	—N/a
August 5, 2011	Kansas City	United States	Kanrocksas Music Festival	—N/a	—N/a
August 6, 2011	Chicago	United States	Lollapalooza	—N/a	—N/a
Europe Leg #2
August 20, 2011	Staffordshire	England	V Festival	—N/a	—N/a
August 21, 2011	Chelmsford	England	V Festival	—N/a	—N/a
August 24, 2011	Bangor	Northern Ireland	Tennent's Vital	—N/a	—N/a
Oceania
December 1, 2011	Melbourne	Australia	Etihad Stadium	—N/a	—N/a
December 2, 2011	Sydney	Australia	Sydney Football Stadium	—N/a	—N/a
December 4, 2011	Sydney	Australia	Sydney Football Stadium	—N/a	—N/a
Asia
August 16, 2012	Osaka	Japan	Maishima Sports Island	—N/a	—N/a
August 17, 2012	Tokyo	Japan	QVC Marine Field; Dr. Dre guest	—N/a	—N/a
August 19, 2012	Seoul	South Korea	Jamsil Olympic Stadium; Dr. Dre guest	—N/a	—N/a
November 4, 2012	Abu Dhabi	United Arab Emirates	Formula 1 Grand Prix	—N/a	—N/a
Europe Leg #3
August 15, 2013	Hasselt (Kiewit)	Belgium	Pukkelpop Festival	—N/a	—N/a
August 17, 2013	Slane	Republic Of Ireland	Slane Castle	—N/a	—N/a
August 20, 2013	Glasgow	Scotland	Glasgow Summer Sessions	—N/a	—N/a
August 22, 2013	Paris	France	Stade de France	71,542 / 71,542	$6,138,550
August 24, 2013	Reading	England	Reading Festival; Dido performed "Stan"	—N/a	—N/a
August 25, 2013	Leeds	England	Leeds Festival; Dido performed "Stan"	—N/a	—N/a

== Cancelled shows ==
List of cancelled concerts, showing date, city, country, venue, and reason for cancellation
Date	City	Country	Venue	Reason
August 19, 2011	Hasselt	Belgium	Pukkelpop	Bad weather - thunderstorm
