= From the D 2 the LBC =

2022 single by Eminem and Snoop Dogg

Single by Eminem and Snoop Dogg

from the album Curtain Call 2
- Released: June 24, 2022
- Genre: Hip-hop
- Length: 3:35
- Label: Aftermath; Shady; Interscope
- Songwriters: Marshall Mathers; Calvin Broadus; Luis Resto
- Producer: Eminem

Eminem singles chronology
"The King and I" (2022)	"From the D 2 the LBC" (2022)	"Is This Love ('09)" (Italy only) "Realest" (2022 / 2023)

Snoop Dogg singles chronology
"Dim My Light" (2021)	"From the D 2 the LBC" (2022)	"Bad Decisions" (2022)

Music video
- "From the D 2 the LBC" on YouTube

"From the D 2 the LBC" is a song by American rappers Eminem and Snoop Dogg. It was released on June 24, 2022, as the second single from Eminem's second greatest hits album, Curtain Call 2 (2022). The song was produced by Eminem and was written by Snoop Dogg, Eminem, and Luis Resto. It marks the first collaboration between the two rappers in over 20 years, having last appeared together on the track "Bitch Please II" from The Marshall Mathers LP (2000).

At the 2023 Detroit Music Awards, the song, along with "The King & I", received an Outstanding National Single nomination, while it music video was nominated for an Outstanding Video - Major Budget, but both lost to Lizzo's “About Damn Time”.

== Background and promotion ==
A brief feud between Snoop Dogg and Eminem was sparked in July 2020 after Snoop appeared on The Breakfast Club and insinuated that Eminem's success was solely because of Eminem's mentor, Dr. Dre. In response, Eminem took jabs at Snoop on the song "Zeus" from his album Music to Be Murdered By – Side B in December 2020. In January 2021, Snoop Dogg responded to Eminem's comments on Instagram, writing, "Pray I don't answer that soft ass shit."

In October 2021, Snoop stated that he and Eminem had ended the feud, with Snoop admitting he now felt that his original remarks were "out of pocket". The two performed together at the Super Bowl LVI halftime show in February 2022.

On June 24, 2022, Eminem released a tweet promoting the single and its accompanying video. The post included the single's cover art, which depicts the two rappers as cartoon monkeys in a comic book style, a reference to their connection to the Bored Ape NFT collection.

== Music video ==
The music video for "From the D 2 the LBC" was released alongside the single. Directed by James Larese, the video alternates between live-action shots of Eminem and Snoop Dogg and an animated video that shows the rappers imagined as NFT-esque avatars in a comic book. In the beginning of the clip, Eminem smells smoke in his studio, then Snoop Dogg is seen smoking cannabis in his studio.

== Live performances ==
On August 28, 2022, Eminem and Snoop Dogg performed the song live at the 2022 MTV Video Music Awards in Newark, New Jersey.

== Charts ==
Chart performance for "From the D 2 the LBC"
Chart (2022)	Peak position
Australia (ARIA)	64
Canada Hot 100 (Billboard)	35
Global 200 (Billboard)	54
Hungary (Single Top 40)	17
Ireland (IRMA)	48
New Zealand Hot Singles (RMNZ)	7
Switzerland (Schweizer Hitparade)	66
UK Singles (Official Charts)	51
US Billboard Hot 100	72
US Hot R&B/Hip-Hop Songs (Billboard)	18

== Release history ==
Release history and formats for "From the D 2 the LBC"
Region	Date	Format	Label	Ref.
Various	June 24, 2022	Digital download	Aftermath; Shady; Interscope	
