= Cinderella Man (Eminem song) =

2010 song by Eminem

Song by Eminem

from the album Recovery
- Released: June 18, 2010
- Genre: Rap rock; arena rock
- Length: 4:39
- Label: Shady; Aftermath; Interscope
- Songwriter: Marshall Mathers
- Producer: Script Shepherd

Lyric video
- "Cinderella Man" on YouTube

"Cinderella Man" is a song by American rapper Eminem from his seventh studio album Recovery (2010). Produced by Script Shepherd, it features uncredited vocals by Kobe and incorporates a sample of Queen's "We Will Rock You".

== Background and release ==
In a 2010 Billboard cover story, Eminem stated that the line "Technically, I'm not even supposed to be here right now" in the song referred to the period between Encore and Relapse, during which he experienced the death of his friend Proof and addiction.

In August 2022, an official lyric video was released to promote his second greatest hits compilation, Curtain Call 2, on which the track appears.

== Theme and lyrics ==
The song's opening line reflects Eminem's survival through a challenging period that involved struggles with addiction and the loss of his friend Proof. The title of the song refers to 1930s world heavyweight boxing champion James J. Braddock. HipHopDX reported that the track is named after Braddock. XXL staff quoted the line "Fuck my last CD that shit's in my trash", which refers to Eminem's rejection of Relapse. NME noted Eminem's candid and self-reflective lyrics on the song, highlighting them in the context of Recovery serving as a comeback after Relapse.

An academic analysis in "Woke Cinderella" (Twenty-First-Century Adaptations) describes "Cinderella Man" as portraying Eminem as a figure of endurance and survival, using a mix of religious imagery and personal loss. It states that the chorus makes this theme explicit through references to God and the word "Amen", while later lyrics refer to his late friend Proof as a continuing guiding presence. The book states that the song uses the Cinderella motif as a modern myth of masculine perseverance rather than as a moral fable. It presents Eminem as a figure who endures against overwhelming odds instead of being redeemed through virtue.

== Composition ==
XXL staff said the song uses a "We Will Rock You"-style drum pattern, with Jesse Gissen comparing it to Eminem's earlier stadium-focused material and Rob Markman describing its "we will, we will rock you" feel. The track was produced by Script Shepherd, marking a departure from the Dr. Dre–led production that is typical of Eminem's albums. Rolling Stone noted that Shepherd provided what the review described as the album's "most festive" beat on "Cinderella Man". He stated that the song's production still follows the album's general template of minor keys and traces of post-grunge rock.

== Critical reception ==
In staff track-by-track review by XXL, several editors responded positively to the song, with Jesse Gissen calling it an "XXL-rated song", Matt Barone describing it as "awesome", and Rob Markman highlighting its stadium-ready quality. NME noted Eminem's candid and self-reflective lyrics on the song, highlighting them in the context of Recovery serving as a comeback after Relapse. The Guardian highlighted the track's beat as a standout on the album, noting that it differs from Eminem's usual production style.

== Live performances ==
In August 2024, Eminem performed the song at BMO Stadium in Los Angeles during a ring-walk appearance for boxer Terence Crawford, with the song placed between "'Till I Collapse" and "Lose Yourself" in the set.

== Media usage ==
In January 2024, the Detroit Lions used "Cinderella Man" in an official pregame hype video for their NFL playoff game against the Los Angeles Rams, with season highlights set to the song and an on-camera introduction by Eminem.

== Charts ==
Chart (2010)	Peak position
US Bubbling Under Hot 100 (Billboard)	11

== Certifications ==
Region	Certification	Source
United States (RIAA)	2× Platinum	
Australia (ARIA)	2× Platinum	
United Kingdom (BPI)	Gold	
New Zealand (RMNZ)	Platinum	

== Personnel ==
- Eminem – vocals, songwriting, mixing engineer
- Kobe – additional vocals
- Nick Low-Beer – drum programming, programming
- Script Shepherd – producer
- Mike Strange – recording engineer, mixing engineer
- Joe Strange – assistant engineer
