= Elvis (soundtrack) =

2022 biographical film soundtrack album

Elvis (Original Motion Picture Soundtrack)

Soundtrack album by Various artists
- Released: June 24, 2022
- Recorded: 2021–2022
- Genres: Pop; rock and roll; jazz; hip hop; rhythm and blues
- Length: 114:28
- Label: RCA
- Producers: Baz Luhrmann; Anton Monsted

Singles from Elvis (Original Motion Picture Soundtrack)
- 1. "Vegas" Released: May 6, 2022; 2. "Tupelo Shuffle" Released: June 3, 2022; 3. "Trouble" Released: June 10, 2022; 4. "The King and I" Released: June 16, 2022; 5. "If I Can Dream" Released: June 16, 2022; 6. "Can't Help Falling In Love" Released: June 22, 2022; 7. "Can't Help Falling In Love (Mark Ronson Remix)" Released: June 30, 2022; 8. "Toxic Las Vegas (Jamieson Shaw Remix)" Released: January 6, 2023; 9. "Can't Help Falling In Love" Released: March 3, 2023

Alternative cover
- Deluxe edition cover

Elvis (Original Motion Picture Soundtrack) is the soundtrack album to the biographical film Elvis, based on the life of American singer-actor Elvis Presley. The soundtrack was released by RCA Records on June 24, 2022, the same day as the film's theatrical release. The album is produced by Baz Luhrmann and Anton Monstead, who also worked on the soundtrack of The Great Gatsby.

The album comprises 36 tracks; while featuring actual recordings of Presley's songs, it also includes tracks performed by Austin Butler (who portrays Presley in the film), and several popular artists. The album features variations on Presley material by big-name artists such as Doja Cat, Eminem, Stevie Nicks, and Jack White in a variety of genres and styles, including pop, rock and roll, jazz, R&B, and hip hop. The album spawned five singles: "Vegas", "Trouble", "The King and I", "If I Can Dream", and "Tupelo Shuffle".

The soundtrack garnered a nomination for the Grammy Award for Best Compilation Soundtrack for Visual Media, as well as being chosen as 2022's best soundtrack by both the Hollywood Music in Media Awards and the American Music Awards. A deluxe edition of the album consisting of unheard recordings of Butler that had been featured in the film was released on March 7, 2023.

== Production ==
The film's soundtrack was expected to consist of Presley's recordings; however, Luhrmann planned to include modern artists and their renditions with hip hop beats, infusing jazz and rock music from the 20th century. Luhrmann said that it was a way of illustrating the radical impact of Presley's sound on current generation of audiences, a technique he did in the soundtrack to The Great Gatsby, in which executive producer Jay-Z had infused hip hop beats with jazz music, while in the novel on which the film is based, Fitzgerald wrote African-American street music and jazz numbers.

"A lot of people don't understand the punk Elvis, the vibrant youth rebel he was in the '50s. People hadn't seen something like this on stage, especially on television. It started to tear off the chains of society at that time. We wanted to have the audience feel that."

— Butler, on syncing modern sounds for the Elvis soundtrack

The incidental underscore is composed by Elliot Wheeler. Before scoring the film, Wheeler had to listen over several recordings and musicals of Presley, to interpret the feel of the music, which Wheeler had stated "You get to treat the script as music, and music as the script. All the musical choices were made to emphasise where Baz wanted the scene to get emotionally." Both Wheeler and Luhrmann had access to the full catalogue of Elvis' recordings where they were able to separate the vocals from the backing instruments, and enables them to resurface the songs and turn them into a soundtrack for a different century. Wheeler expressed that "What we've tried to do with this film is give [modern audiences] a take on what it must have felt like to see Elvis in his prime. There's a nostalgia people associate with those recordings. But we're trying to show a 21st-century audience how Elvis changed Western culture".

Sound artists and audio engineers François Tétaz and Lachlan Carrick mastered and co-produced the album (which was nominated for a Grammy), including the Doja Cat track.

== Songs, artists, and styles ==
The film features several recordings of Elvis Presley, performed by the ensemble cast members, as revealed in the June 18, 2022 magazine guide published by Variety. Prior to the release, Luhrmann also stated that the film had unfiltered versions of Presley's songs, performed by Butler and hybrid versions of songs that blend Butler's voice with Presley's recordings. However, those songs were not be included in the album.

The album comprises 36 tracks; while featuring actual recordings of Presley's songs, it also includes tracks performed by Austin Butler (who portrays Presley in the film), and several popular artists, namely Doja Cat, Eminem, Diplo, Stevie Nicks, Jack White, and Swae Lee, among others. The album also features variations on Presley material by big-name artists in a variety of genres and styles. It consists of a mix of genres, including pop, rock and roll, jazz, R&B and hip hop. The album spawned five singles: "Vegas", "Trouble", "The King and I", "If I Can Dream", and "Tupelo Shuffle".

Stevie Nicks and Chris Isaak recorded the track "Cotton Candy Land", a song featured in the film It Happened at the World’s Fair (1963) and not released as a single. "A Fool Such As I", rendered by Isaak, was originally performed by Hank Snow. Snow's original version reached the fourth position on the country chart in 1953. "Black Snake Moan" and "That's All Right" were performed by Gary Clark Jr. (as Arthur Crudup). "How Do You Think I Feel" was rendered by Kodi Smit-McPhee, who plays Jimmie Rodgers Snow, Hank Snow's son. "Hound Dog" was recorded by Shonka Dukureh (as Big Mama Thornton) in the film, and "Tiger Man" was performed by Rufus Thomas. Yola who played Sister Rosetta Tharpe, records two songs "Working on the Building" and "Strange Things Happening Every Day".

== Promotion and release ==
Prior to the soundtrack release, the album topped the new music releases of the week (June 24–30), according to a report by Cleveland Magazine. The soundtrack was released by RCA Records on June 24, 2022, coinciding with the film's theatrical release. Variety magazine released a special music insight about the album and Presley's songs in the film, as did NME with their special issue dedicated to the film.

On March 7, 2023, RCA released the deluxe edition of the soundtrack that featured vocal performances of the lead actor Austin Butler, who recorded several tracks as heard in the film. The album also featured contemporary takes on Presley's classic songs and contributions from the original score composer Elliot Wheeler.

== Singles ==
On April 25, 2022, it was announced that Doja Cat would contribute an original song for the film "Vegas", that incorporates elements from Presley's own songs, such as his cover of Big Mama Thornton's "Hound Dog". It was released as a single on May 6, 2022. The music video of the track was released on June 3, featuring Cat along with a cameo by Shonka Dukureh, who plays Thornton in the film.

On May 23, 2022, rapper Eminem announced on his Instagram that he and CeeLo Green will collaborate on a new track titled "The King and I" which will be produced by Dr. Dre and will appear on the film's soundtrack. The single, prior to its release on June 16, 2022, was unveiled as a first listen in the 2022 Cannes Film Festival. The track sampled Presley's "Jailhouse Rock". The lyrics describe on the rise and fall of Presley, from catapulting to stardom to his arrest". Through the lyrics, Eminem said that "he had a parallel connection with Presley as the latter used to rock the 'jailhouse' and he used to rock the 'shelter'", while also referencing about their "accusations" on stealing Black music.

The single "Tupelo Shuffle" performed by Swae Lee and Diplo was released on June 3, 2022. Lee and Diplo further performed the track at the 2022 MTV Movie & TV Awards on June 5. Butler's rendition of "Trouble" was released as the single on June 10. Italian band Måneskin and Kacey Musgraves are also part of the soundtrack with their respective cover versions of "If I Can Dream" and "Can't Help Falling in Love". The tracks were released as singles on June 16 and 22, respectively. Måneskin explained their work on the song, and collaboration with Luhrmann, saying: "We were talking about it with Baz Luhrmann, who had this really cool, super-smart idea, because it would have been so easy to give us an up-tempo song and go super rock-ish. He saw that between the lines that we were going to be able to give something else to show the sweet side of Elvis." The band further stated about the track: "It is about uniting, it's about peace, freedom and happiness". A remix of the solo performance by Mark Ronson was released on June 30.

To promote the album's deluxe edition, two singles were released—"Toxic Las Vegas" (Jamieson Shaw Remix), a remixed mashup version of Britney Spears' 2004 single "Toxic" with Presley's "Viva Las Vegas" was released on January 6, 2023, and Kacey Musgraves' performance of "Can't Help Falling in Love" remixed by Ronson was released on March 3.

== Reception ==
Kyle Buchanan, writer at The New York Times, tweeted after the film's Cannes premiere, saying "the soundtrack features a song which interpolates Presley with both the Backstreet Boys' 'Everybody (Backstreet's Back)' and Britney Spears' 'Toxic', and you'd be hard pressed to find anything more Luhrmann than that". Stephanie Anderson, writing for The Latch called it "another iconic Luhrmann soundtrack". Gino Diminich of Indiana Daily Student opined that the soundtrack "is not bad but it could have been much better given the legacy it is reflecting. While a modern remix or cover of Elvis is not bad as several songs prove, Luhrmann should have trusted the original material more and not tried to modernize every song in an attempt to reach a younger audience."

Pip Ellwood-Hughes of Entertainment Focus called that "the Elvis soundtrack shows the breadth of the King’s influence". Ed Power of Irish Examiner commented "Jack White and Kacey Musgrave [sic] are great, but some of the other workings of Elvis songs aren't quite worthy of the king of rock'n'roll". In a negative review, James Stone of SCAD Radio wrote "the soundtrack lent more to recent trends within the music industry rather than the influences of Elvis and the music relevant to his rise to fame. Sure, this could push the message of what a great mark Elvis left on the music industry. The movie wasn't about who his music would go on to influence, though, it was about his life and his rise to fame." He further felt that, the soundtrack "was not the worst soundtrack ever heard, but it definitely was all over the place and did not live up to the hype".

The album, released on June 24, 2022, entered the Billboard Soundtrack Albums chart at #1 on its July 9, 2022 issue, as well as charting at number 26 on the Billboard 200. After a few weeks inside the top ten, it then returned to the top of Soundtrack chart, as well as landed on number 27, as reported on the Billboard 200's August 13, 2022 issue.

== Track listing ==
On June 10, 2022, the track listing for the film's soundtrack, consisting of thirty-six tracks, surfaced online via Apple Music. The digital release of the album consists of 36 tracks, whereas the physical CD release includes only 22 of those tracks.

Digital release track listing
No.	Title	Artist(s)	Length
1.	"Suspicious Minds" (vocal intro)	Elvis Presley	0:28
2.	"Also sprach Zarathustra / An American Trilogy"	Presley	2:09
3.	"Vegas"	Doja Cat	3:03
4.	"The King and I"	Eminem; CeeLo Green	3:16
5.	"Tupelo Shuffle"	Swae Lee; Diplo	2:47
6.	"I Got a Feelin' in My Body"	Presley; Stuart Price	3:34
7.	"Craw-Fever"	Presley	3:46
8.	"Don't Fly Away" (Pnau remix)	Presley; Pnau	4:06
9.	"Can't Help Falling in Love"	Kacey Musgraves	2:48
10.	"Product of the Ghetto"	Nardo Wick	3:17
11.	"If I Can Dream"	Måneskin	3:16
12.	"Cotton Candy Land"	Stevie Nicks; Chris Isaak	2:42
13.	"Baby, Let's Play House"	Austin Butler	2:13
14.	"I'm Comin' Home" (film mix)	Presley	2:23
15.	"Hound Dog"	Shonka Dukureh	3:28
16.	"Tutti Frutti"	Les Greene	2:23
17.	"Strange Things Happening Every Day"	Yola	4:05
18.	"Hound Dog"	Butler	2:07
19.	"Let It All Hang Out"	Denzel Curry	2:13
20.	"Trouble"	Butler	2:20
21.	"I Got a Feelin' in My Body"	Lenesha Randolph	4:32
22.	"Edge of Reality" (Tame Impala remix)	Presley; Impala	2:42
23.	"Summer Kisses / In My Body"	Presley	3:17
24.	"'68 Comeback Special" (Medley: "Heartbreak Hotel", "Hound Dog", "Blue Suede Shoes", "Jailhouse Rock")	Presley	2:43
25.	"Sometimes I Feel Like a Motherless Child"	Jazmine Sullivan	2:45
26.	"If I Can Dream" (stereo mix)	Presley	3:11
27.	"Any Day Now"	Presley	3:01
28.	"Power of My Love"	Presley; Jack White	4:16
29.	"Vegas Rehearsal / That's All Right"	Butler; Presley	3:58
30.	"Suspicious Minds"	Presley	6:17
31.	"Polk Salad Annie" (film mix)	Presley	4:55
32.	"Burning Love" (film mix)	Presley	3:03
33.	"It's Only Love"	Presley	2:38
34.	"Suspicious Minds"	Paravi	3:46
35.	"In the Ghetto" (World Turns remix)	Presley; Nardo Wick	3:37
36.	"Unchained Melody"	Presley	3:23

Deluxe edition track listing
No.	Title	Artist(s)	Length
1.	"Suspicious Minds" (vocal intro)	Presley	0:28
2.	"Fly Away Weave"	Elliott Wheeler; Gary Clark Jr.; Shannon Sanders; Nashville Urban Choir; Butler; Shonka Dukureh; Lenesha Randolph	3:53
3.	"Baby, Let's Play House"	Butler	2:13
4.	"Hound Dog"	Shonka Dukureh	3:28
5.	"Blue Moon" (Take 9/M)	Presley	2:39
6.	"Blue Suede Shoes"	Butler	1:55
7.	"How Do You Think I Feel"	Kodi Smit-McPhee; Elliott Wheeler	3:18
8.	"Heartbreak Hotel"	Butler; Elliott Wheeler	0:30
9.	"I'm Coming Home" (film mix)	Presley	2:23
10.	"Hound Dog"	Butler	2:07
11.	"Tutti Frutti"	Les Greene	2:23
12.	"Strange Things Are Happening Every Day"	Yola	4:05
13.	"Trouble"	Butler	2:20
14.	"Crawfish" (live on set)	Butler	2:42
15.	"Can't Help Falling in Love" (Elliott Wheeler remix)	Presley	3:25
16.	"Can't Help Falling in Love"	Kacey Musgraves	2:48
17.	"A Little Less Conversation" (JXL radio edit remix)	Presley; JXL	3:32
18.	"Toxic Las Vegas" (Jamieson Shaw remix)	Presley; Britney Spears	3:19
19.	"Backstreet Bossa Nova" (Daisy O'Dell remix)	Presley; Backstreet Boys	2:52
20.	"Rubberneckin'" (Paul Oakenfold remix / radio edit)	Presley	3:29
21.	"Cotton Candy Land"	Stevie Nicks; Chris Isaak	2:42
22.	"Edge of Reality" (Tame Impala remix)	Presley; Tame Impala	2:42
23.	"'68 Comeback Special" (medley)	Presley	2:43
24.	"If I Can Dream"	Presley	3:11
25.	"Any Day Now"	Presley	3:01
26.	"Vegas Rehearsal / That's All Right"	Butler; Presley	3:58
27.	"Suspicious Minds" (film edit)	Presley	6:17
28.	"Can't Help Falling in Love" (August 12 – midnight show)	Presley	2:00
29.	"Polk Salad Annie" (film mix)	Presley	4:55
30.	"Burning Love" (film mix)	Presley	3:03
31.	"It's Only Love"	Presley	2:38
32.	"Also sprach Zarathustra / An American Trilogy"	Presley	2:09
33.	"Are You Lonesome Tonight?"	Butler; Elliott Wheeler	1:39
34.	"Unchained Melody" (film mix)	Presley	3:23
35.	"Vegas"	Doja Cat	3:03
36.	"The King and I"	Eminem; CeeLo Green	3:16
37.	"Tupelo Shuffle"	Swae Lee and Diplo featuring Gary Clark Jr. and Butler	2:47
38.	"I Got a Feelin' in My Body"	Presley; Stuart Price	3:34
39.	"Craw-Fever"	Presley	3:46
40.	"Don't Fly Away" ((PNAU Remix))	Presley; Pnau	4:06
41.	"Product of the Ghetto"	Nardo Wick; Presley	3:17
42.	"If I Can Dream"	Måneskin	3:16
43.	"Let It All Hang Out"	Denzel Curry featuring PlayThatBoiZay	2:13
44.	"I Got a Feelin' in My Body"	Lenesha Randolph	4:32
45.	"Summer Kisses / In My Body"	Presley	3:17
46.	"Sometimes I Feel Like a Motherless Child"	Jazmine Sullivan	2:45
47.	"Power of My Love"	Presley; Jack White	4:16
48.	"Suspicious Minds"	Paravi	3:46
49.	"In the Ghetto" (World Turns remix)	Presley featuring Nardo Wick	3:37
50.	"Can't Help Falling in Love" (Mark Ronson remix)	Presley; Mark Ronson	3:44
51.	"Can't Help Falling in Love"	Kacey Musgraves; Mark Ronson	2:24
52.	"Can't Help Falling in Love"	G-Dragon	2:31

== Charts ==
=== Weekly charts ===
Weekly chart performance for Elvis (Original Motion Picture Soundtrack)
Chart (2022)	Peak position
Australian Albums (ARIA)	4
Austrian Albums (Ö3 Austria)	16
Belgian Albums (Ultratop Flanders)	29
Belgian Albums (Ultratop Wallonia)	54
Canadian Albums (Billboard)	32
Dutch Albums (Album Top 100)	73
French Albums (SNEP)	40
German Albums (Offizielle Top 100)	18
Japanese Albums (Oricon)	40
Japanese Hot Albums (Billboard Japan)	48
Lithuanian Albums (AGATA)	64
Polish Albums (ZPAV)	19
Spanish Albums (Promusicae)	45
Swiss Albums (Schweizer Hitparade)	11
UK Album Downloads (Official Charts)	8
UK Soundtrack Albums (Official Charts)	1
US Billboard 200	26
US Soundtrack Albums (Billboard)	1
US Top Rock Albums (Billboard)	4

=== Year-end charts ===
2022 year-end chart performance for Elvis (Original Motion Picture Soundtrack)
Chart (2022)	Position
US Billboard 200	199
US Soundtrack Albums (Billboard)	11

2023 year-end chart performance for Elvis (Original Motion Picture Soundtrack)
Chart (2023)	Position
US Soundtrack Albums (Billboard)	15

== Awards and nominations ==
Accolades received by Elvis (2022 film)
Award	Date of Ceremony	Category	Recipient(s)	Result	Ref.
AACTA Awards	December 5, 2022	Best Original Music Score	Elliott Wheeler	Nominated	
American Music Awards	November 20, 2022	Top Soundtrack	Elvis	Won	
Dorian Awards	February 23, 2023	Film Music of the Year	Elvis	Nominated	
Golden Reel Awards	February 26, 2023	Outstanding Achievement in Music Editing – Feature Motion Picture	Jamieson Shaw, Evan McHugh, and Chris Barrett	Won	
Grammy Awards	February 5, 2023	Best Compilation Soundtrack for Visual Media	Elvis	Nominated	
Grammy Awards	February 5, 2023	Best Rap Performance	Doja Cat for "Vegas"	Nominated	
Guild of Music Supervisors Awards	March 5, 2023	Best Music Supervision for Films Budgeted Over $25 Million	Anton Monsted	Won	
Guild of Music Supervisors Awards	March 5, 2023	Best Song Written and/or Recorded Created for a Film	Jerry Leiber, Mike Stoller, Amala Dlamini, David Sprecher, Rogét Chahayed, Doja Cat, and Anton Monsted for "Vegas"	Nominated	
Guild of Music Supervisors Awards	March 5, 2023	Best Music Supervision in a Trailer – Film	Deric Berberabe and Jordan Silverberg for "Trailer 2"	Nominated	
Hollywood Music in Media Awards	November 16, 2022	Music Supervision — Film	Anton Monsted	Won	
Hollywood Music in Media Awards	November 16, 2022	Music Themed Film, Biopic or Musical	Elvis	Nominated	
Hollywood Music in Media Awards	November 16, 2022	Soundtrack Album	Elvis	Won	
Lumiere Awards	February 10, 2023	Best Musical Scene or Sequence	Elvis	Won	
MTV Movie & TV Awards	May 7, 2023	Best Song	Doja Cat for "Vegas"	Nominated	
MTV Movie & TV Awards	May 7, 2023	Best Musical Moment	"Trouble"	Nominated	
New York Film Critics Online Awards	December 11, 2022	Best Use of Music	Elvis	Won	
Satellite Awards	March 3, 2023	Best Original Song	Doja Cat for "Vegas"	Nominated	
