= Won't Back Down (Eminem song) =

2010 song by Eminem featuring Pink

Song by Eminem featuring Pink

from the album Recovery
- Released: June 18, 2010
- Studio: 54 Sound, Effigy Studios; (Ferndale, Michigan)
- Genre: Hip hop; rap rock
- Length: 4:25
- Label: Shady; Aftermath; Interscope
- Songwriters: Marshall Mathers; Khalil Abdul-Rahman; Erik Alcock; Columbus Smith
- Producer: DJ Khalil

Lyric video
- "Won't Back Down" on YouTube

"Won't Back Down" is a song by American rapper Eminem featuring singer Pink. It is the fourth track on his seventh studio album Recovery (2010). The track features production from Aftermath Entertainment producer DJ Khalil, who helped write the song along with Eminem, Erik Alcock, and Columbus "Rahki" Smith.

Upon the release of Recovery, the song received generally positive reviews from music critics, who praised its aggressive nature and production. "Won't Back Down" charted at numbers 62, 65, 82, and 87 in the United States, Canada, the United Kingdom, and Australia respectively. It was used in the video game Call of Duty: Black Ops and its trailer as well as the trailers for the films Mission: Impossible – Ghost Protocol and Hitman: Agent 47. Eminem performed the song on Saturday Night Live and Late Night with Jimmy Fallon.

It was later included on Eminem's second greatest hits album, Curtain Call 2, through Shady Records, Aftermath Entertainment, and Interscope Records.

== Background and composition ==
"Won't Back Down" was written by Eminem, DJ Khalil, Erik Alcock and Columbus "Rahki" Smith. Along with most of the songs from Recovery, "Won't Back Down" was recorded at 54 Sound and Effigy Studios in Ferndale, Michigan, with recording carried out by Mike Strange. The song is one of the few Eminem songs not in a 4/4 time signature, along with "Untitled" (also from Recovery), "Need Me" (from Revival), "Leaving Heaven" (from Music to be Murdered By), "Underground" (from Relapse), and "We Made You" (also from Relapse). Originally, the song was set to be a solo record, with Eminem singing the chorus himself. Later, Liz Rodriguez, who is also featured on Recovery's "25 to Life" and "Almost Famous", recorded the song's chorus. Eminem however, explained in an interview that after recording his vocals for the song, he decided to include Pink on the song as he "felt like she would really smash this record." Rahki co-produced the song with Khalil.

On September 12, 2022, a lyric video for Won't Back Down was released on Eminem's YouTube channel.

== Critical reception ==
Upon its release, "Won't Back Down" received generally positive reviews from most music critics. David Jeffries of AllMusic wrote positively of the song, describing it as a "lurching heavy metal monster" that "could be used as the lead-in to 'Lose Yourself' on any ego-boosting mixtape", but wrote more critically of the lyrics, denouncing the pop culture jokes featured throughout the song, particularly ones aimed at Michael J. Fox, calling the line "Make like Michael J. Fox in your drawers, playin' with an Etch-A-Sketch" "less effective" than other jokes aimed at him. Steve Jones of USA Today described it as "rock-tinged" and stated that Pink's appearance provides "outside star power".

== Chart performance ==
"Won't Back Down" charted on four national charts worldwide due to digital sales on the release of Recovery. The song reached its highest position on the US Billboard Hot 100, where it peaked at number 62 on the chart for the week ending of July 10, 2010, although it fell off the chart the following week. The song also charted in Australia, Canada and the United Kingdom, peaking at number 87, 65 and 82 on their respective national charts, although on all three the song again only appeared for one week.

== Appearances in media ==
A remixed version of the ESPN trailer of the video game Call of Duty: Black Ops featuring "Won't Back Down" was released on June 14, prior to the E3 Activision conference, for which he also performed. The song was also featured in the game's credits and Zombies mode map "Five" as an easter egg. The official trailer for the 2011 action film, Mission: Impossible – Ghost Protocol, features "Won't Back Down". The song is also featured in TV spots for the 2015 movie Hitman: Agent 47.

Eminem has performed the song on live sketch comedy show Saturday Night Live accompanied by Lil Wayne and hypeman and D12 member Mr. Porter. Eminem wore a black jacket and a skull cap. Idolator reacted positively to Eminem's performance, stating that he proved "once again what a dynamic and energetic live performer he is on this exceptionally angry tune (even by Slim Shady standards)." He also performed the song on Late Night with Jimmy Fallon.

== Credits and personnel ==
Credits are adapted from the liner notes of Recovery.

Recording

- Recorded at: Effigy Studios in Ferndale, Michigan.

Personnel

- Eminem – vocals, audio mixing and songwriting
- DJ Khalil – producer, additional keyboards and drum programming
- Mike Strange – recording and audio mixing
- Joe Strange – engineering assistant
- Eric Alcock – guitar
- Pink – vocals
- Rahki – keyboards and additional drum programming

== Charts ==
Chart (2010)	Peak position
Australia (ARIA)	87
Canada (Canadian Hot 100)	65
UK Singles (Official Charts Company)	82
US Billboard Hot 100	62

== Certifications ==
Region	Certification	Certified units/sales
Australia (ARIA)	Gold	35,000^{‡}
United Kingdom (BPI)	Silver	200,000^{‡}
United States (RIAA)	Platinum	1,000,000^{‡}
^{‡} Sales+streaming figures based on certification alone.
