= Recovery (Eminem album) =

2010 studio album

Studio album by Eminem
- Released: June 18, 2010
- Recorded: July 2009–May 2010
- Studios: Effigy (Detroit, Michigan)
- Genres: Hip-hop; pop rap; alternative hip-hop
- Length: 77:08
- Labels: Shady; Goliath; Aftermath; WEB; Interscope
- Producers: Dr. Dre; Alex da Kid; Boi-1da; DJ Khalil; Emile; Havoc; JG; Jim Jonsin; Jordan Evans; Just Blaze; Eminem; Magnedo7; Makeba Riddick; Matthew Burnett; Mr. Porter; Nick Brongers; Supa Dups; Script Shepherd

Eminem chronology
Relapse (2009)	Recovery (2010)	Hell: The Sequel (2011)

Singles from Recovery
- 1. "Not Afraid" Released: April 27, 2010; 2. "Love the Way You Lie" Released: June 18, 2010; 3. "No Love" Released: October 5, 2010; 4. "Space Bound" Released: June 18, 2011

Recovery is the seventh studio album by the American rapper Eminem, released on June 18, 2010, by Shady Records, Goliath Artists, Aftermath Entertainment, WEB Entertainment, and Interscope Records. Unlike his previous albums, it features a majority of outside producers, including Alex da Kid, Just Blaze, Boi-1da, Jim Jonsin and Havoc, alongside the in-house producers Emile, DJ Khalil, Mr. Porter, and Dr. Dre. The album also features pop artists such as Pink, Kobe, and Rihanna, as well as rapper Lil Wayne and the rap group Slaughterhouse. Recovery featured more introspective and emotional content than its predecessor and the theme of the album revolved around his positive changes, anxiety, and emotional drives.

To promote Recovery, Eminem performed the album's songs on televised shows, at award ceremonies, and musical events; he also headed The Recovery Tour. The album debuted at number one on the Billboard 200 with first-week sales of 741,000 copies. It also reached number one in 16 other countries. It spawned four singles: "Not Afraid", "Love the Way You Lie", "No Love", and "Space Bound", with the former two both reaching number one on the Billboard Hot 100. Recovery was the best-selling album worldwide in 2010 and the best-selling album in the US in 2010. The album received generally positive reviews by critics, earning Eminem a multitude of award nominations, and was widely regarded as an improvement to Relapse.

In 2022, Recovery was certified 8× platinum by the Recording Industry Association of America (RIAA), becoming Eminem's third best-selling studio album behind The Marshall Mathers LP (2000) and The Eminem Show (2002). At the 2011 Grammy Awards, it was nominated for Album of the Year, while "Love the Way You Lie" was nominated for Song of the Year and Record of the Year. The album earned Eminem American Music Awards and Billboard Music Awards, among other awards.

== Background and production ==
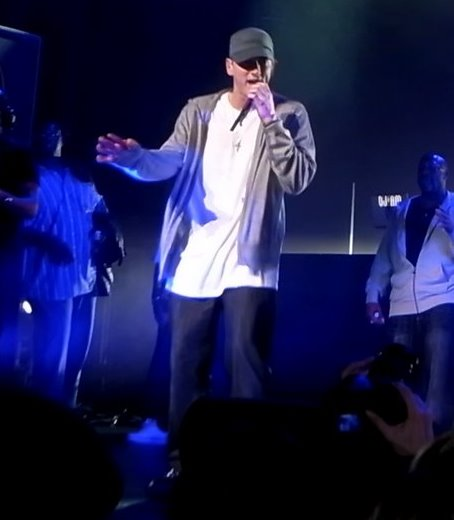
Eminem first planned the release of Relapse 2 as a sequel to Relapse.

Due to Eminem recording far more material than he could use for one album, he felt that he had to offer his fans more music. After staying on hiatus for so long, fellow D12 member Swift confirmed that Eminem had in fact planned to put out two albums that year, following with Relapse 2 in late 2009. According to Angela Yee's Shade 45 interview with Eminem on April 23, 2009, Relapse 2 was to be a continuation of Relapse. During the interview, Eminem confirmed: "It's extremely close to being finished, it just depends on how many songs I want to put on it." Eminem also explained that the album was more "emotionally driven" than Relapse, which was, as he explains, "[just] rap records". Guest appearances were expected to come from the likes of Dr. Dre, 50 Cent, D12, Royce da 5'9", Lloyd Banks and Cashis. The album was subsequently pushed back for an early 2010 release, so Eminem decided to re-release Relapse as Relapse: Refill, which includes a bonus disc featuring seven new tracks, including the single "Forever" (originally on More Than a Game soundtrack) and "Taking My Ball" (released with DJ Hero), as well as five previously unreleased tracks. During the recording process of the album, Eminem stated that "The new tracks started to sound very different than the tracks I originally intended to be on Relapse 2, but I still want the other stuff [Relapse: Refill] to be heard". On its re-release, Eminem stated: "I want to deliver more material for the fans this year like I originally planned. Hopefully these tracks on The Refill will tide the fans over until we put out Relapse 2 next year."

On April 13, 2010, Eminem tweeted "There is no Relapse 2", thus announcing that the album had been scrapped in favour of his new project Recovery. While recording Relapse 2 and witnessing the mixed reaction of its predecessor among fans and critics alike, Eminem decided to throw away most of the recorded material and started from scratch. The result appeared to be more of an individual project that deserved its own name, other than a continuation of Relapse. Eminem said: "I had originally planned for Relapse 2 to come out last year. But as I kept recording and working with new producers, the idea of a sequel to Relapse started to make less and less sense to me, and I wanted to make a completely new album. The music on Recovery came out very different from Relapse, and I think it deserves its own title."

The track "Insult to Injury" would have been the leading track according to The Alchemist, the producer of the track. "Hit Me With Your Best Shot" featuring D12 was a track that leaked that was recorded around early 2010 and style was more close to Recovery than Relapse. "Cocaine" featuring Jazmine Sullivan also leaked but it wasn't confirmed if it was for Relapse 2 or Recovery also recorded in 2010. "Nut Up" was a leaked song from when Eminem was recording in Hawaii. "Things Get Worse" was originally recorded in 2009 and was a solo track before Eminem and B.o.B collaborated for B.o.B's Greatest Hits album. On the track "Zeus" from the album Music to Be Murdered By: Side B, Eminem apologizes to Rihanna over an alternate leaked version of "Things Get Worse" in which he sided with Chris Brown, who pleaded guilty to felony assault involving her in 2009. A song of unknown title featuring 50 Cent and two songs led by Mr. Porter were also expected.

All the songs from Relapse: Refill were going to be part of Relapse 2. The songs "On Fire", "So Bad" and "Ridaz" from Recovery were recorded in the same sessions in Hawaii which led to speculation that they could have been intended for Relapse 2. Although after the release of Relapse: Refill it is possible that Eminem had already moved on to Recovery.

== Themes and composition ==
"Not Afraid"
A 23-second sample of the song with the chorus, in which a choir assists Eminem and heavy layering is used.

The album was dedicated "To anyone who's in a dark place tryin' to get out. Keep your head up... It does get better!" Eminem told Billboard that he was in "full-blown addiction" while recording Encore. He felt happier and "first got sober" during the recording of Relapse, having overcome his addiction. While recording Relapse, he admitted that he had not been "paying attention to what the average listener might like or not like." Just Blaze, the first producer of the album said, "[Eminem] already knew what sort of mistakes he has made with the previous album and where he wanted to go from there." Thus, Recovery was more "emotionally driven" than Relapse, which was, as he explains, "[just] rap records." In contrast to Eminem's previous work, the album features no skits, and downplays his Slim Shady alter ego.

The record opens with "Cold Wind Blows" in which Eminem discusses his "doomed love for his ex-wife" and about "settling scores with rival celebs." In "Talkin' 2 Myself", he states the harm caused to his image with lyrics such as: "Encore' I was on drugs, 'Relapse' I was flushing them out." "On Fire" is about "a murder-and-dismemberment fantasy" and "Won't Back Down", which featured Pink, was a rap rock song. The singing to "W.T.P." ("White-Trash Party") is considered similar to his early records with lighter and simple rhythmic frame. "Going Through Changes", which samples Black Sabbath's "Changes", depicts Eminem's sorrow and shows himself trapped within fame. "Not Afraid", a mid-tempo song, focuses on personal changes in Eminem, including an end to drug abuse, feuds and violence.

Idolator commented that the song was based on the "dark days Eminem has lived through," and "he seems to be at peace with himself now." A writer for MuchMusic website noted that Eminem chose to use his Marshall Mathers ego for the song, rather than Slim Shady.

"No Love" features Lil Wayne as a hype man. Eminem's verses follow Lil Wayne, and according to Sam Wolfson of NME were "the best verses of his career." The meaning of "Space Bound" is deemed ambiguous and according to Sasha Grey who is featured in its video, the meaning can be interpreted "in many ways." Jim Jonsin of MTV spoke about Eminem's two egos seen in the video and compared it to Alanis Morissette's "Ironic" video while Grey believed that the alternate Eminem who appears in the car is his subconscious.

"Cinderella Man" has a "festive beat" and "the template of every album since Encore (2004)," with many minor keys and traces of post-grunge rock. "25 to Life" shows his discomfiture and depicts that the "selfish bitch" pulling him back "these days is rap itself." Despite the lyrics being tighter throughout the album, "So Bad" and "Almost Famous" view the other side of Slim Shady; his alter ego. The hip-hop ballad "Love the Way You Lie", which features Rihanna, describes a couple's refusal to separate despite having an abusive relationship. Rihanna sings the chorus, backed by an electric guitar and a piano, while acoustic guitar, violin and drums accompany Eminem's verses. Rihanna's singing expresses "grief and regret" throughout the song.

"You're Never Over" is a tribute to Eminem's best friend and fellow D12 member Proof, who was killed in 2006. The song is backed by distorted guitars over a minimal beat, and Eminem sings the chorus. On the Shade 45 special Road to Recovery, Eminem said that he had tried recording a Proof tribute multiple times in the past and that "every attempt just wasn't good enough" prior to "You're Never Over", which he considered the album's "most important song".

== Release and promotion ==
To promote the album, Eminem released a freestyle titled "Despicable" about "Over" by Drake and "Beamer, Benz, or Bentley" by Lloyd Banks (featuring Juelz Santana) to promote the first single, "Not Afraid", which debuted on Shade 45 on April 29. Recovery was released on June 18 in Europe and on June 21 in the United States and United Kingdom.

Eminem promoted the album throughout its initial release, doing interviews for brands like Red Bull. A commercial for Recovery premiered during Game 6 of the 2010 NBA Finals. It featured Vince Offer doing a parody of his Slap Chop commercials. There was a Call of Duty: Black Ops ad underscored by "Won't Back Down"; the song also appeared in the game as an easter egg.

On June 15, Eminem appeared among other artists including Usher and will.i.am for Activision's press conference during the Electronic Entertainment Expo 2010 with Rihanna where the duo performed "Love the Way You Lie". In addition, Eminem performed "Lose Yourself", "Not Afraid", and premiered "Won't Back Down" for the first time. Eminem was featured on E! during their Daily 10 show in an interview with Clinton Sparks and also appeared in a skit on The Soup. He performed songs from the album as well as his previous songs at various events such as the 2010 BET Awards, 2010 MTV Video Music Awards, Electronic Entertainment Expo 2010, Bonnaroo Music Festival, T in the Park and Virgin Group's V Festival. He also headed The Recovery Tour; a series of European, American and Australian concerts in support of the album and its predecessor Relapse.

=== Singles ===
The first single, "Not Afraid", was released on April 29, 2010. The song sold 380,000 digital downloads in its first week, and it became the sixteenth song in the history of the US Billboard Hot 100 to debut at number one; it is the second hip hop single to debut at number one following "I'll Be Missing You" by Puff Daddy and Faith Evans featuring 112.

It has sold more than 5 million copies and is certified 10× Platinum ♦ by RIAA in the US. "Not Afraid" which was directed by Rich Lee, premiered on June 5, 2010, through Vevo. The music video was shot in Newark, New Jersey and won the MTV Video Music Award for Best Male Video at the 2010 MTV Video Music Awards. The song also won Best Solo Rap Performance at the 53rd Annual Grammy Awards.

The second single was released on August 9, 2010, titled "Love the Way You Lie", which featured Rihanna. The song debuted at number two on the US Billboard Hot 100 and later peaked number one. The song gave Eminem his fourth US Billboard Hot 100 number one and Rihanna her seventh. It also claimed the top spot on over 20 other charts worldwide. "Love the Way You Lie" went on to be number one on the US Billboard Hot 100 for seven consecutive weeks and is certified Diamond by RIAA and has sold more than 6 million in US. The song became Eminem's best-selling single of all time, selling 9.3 million copies worldwide. Joseph Kahn directed the music video which premiered on August 5, 2010. The video starred Dominic Monaghan and Megan Fox. Michael Menachem from Billboard commented that "Rihanna's chorus is exquisitely melodic and surprisingly hopeful, complementing the turmoil of Em's dark, introspective rant." The song was performed at the 2010 MTV Video Music Awards and was voted the best performer of the ceremony in an MTV poll, earning 34 percent of votes.

"No Love", which features American rapper Lil Wayne, was the third single released on October 5, 2010. "No Love" featured sample of "What Is Love" by Haddaway, which was done by producer Just Blaze. The song peaked number 23 on the Billboard Hot 100 and stayed on the charts for 20 weeks. The music video, directed by Chris Robinson, premiered on September 30 via Vevo and various MTV networks. The video was about a young school boy who was bullied but had the urge to stand up after being motivated by listening to songs by Eminem and Lil Wayne. They performed "No Love" on Saturday Night Live on December 18, 2010.

"Space Bound" was released as the fourth and final single from the album on March 18, 2011. English songwriter Steve McEwan provided additional vocals in the chorus of the song. The single did not enter US Billboard Hot 100, however was certified Gold in United States on February 9, 2012. The music video for "Space Bound" was shot in February 2011 by Joseph Kahn. The uncensored music video was released on June 24, 2011, at 5 PM EST on iTunes only and the official video then premiered on Vevo on June 27 at 3 AM EST. The video stars porn actress Sasha Grey and Eminem in a relationship which ends violently; the video caused controversy for a bloody scene in which Eminem shoots himself. The video was slammed by British anti-violence campaigners. Anti-violence group, Mothers Against Violence, told the Daily Mirror, "It's all about the money with these videos. Eminem isn't thinking about the families affected."

Songs "25 to Life", "Won't Back Down", "Talkin' 2 Myself", and "Cold Wind Blows" also debuted on the US Billboard Hot 100 without release as singles.

On February 28, 2018, "Cinderella Man" and "Won’t Back Down" were certified Platinum in the United States, while "Cold Wind Blows", "25 to Life" and "Talkin’ 2 Myself" were certified Gold.

== Album covers and art direction ==
The album's artwork featured two covers: one with Eminem walking down Dutton Road in Auburn Hills and another with him sitting in a transparent living room in the middle of Detroit with the Renaissance Center in the background. The album's liner featured pictures of Eminem such as a picture of him praying and him posing without a shirt on.

The album's alternate cover also inspired Drake's album, Views (2016), which showed him sitting on top of Toronto's CN Tower, and respectively YoungBoy Never Broke Again's Don't Try This at Home (2023), depicting YoungBoy standing at the bottom of a steamboat across the Horace Wilkinson Bridge in Baton Rouge.

== Critical reception ==
Professional ratings
Aggregate scores
Source	Rating
AnyDecentMusic?	6.1/10
Metacritic	63/100
Review scores
Source	Rating
AllMusic	3.5/5 stars
The A.V. Club	B
The Daily Telegraph	4/5 stars
Entertainment Weekly	B+
The Guardian	3/5 stars
MSN Music (Expert Witness)	A−
NME	7/10
Pitchfork	2.8/10
Rolling Stone	4/5 stars
Spin	7/10

According to the review aggregator Metacritic, Recovery received "generally favorable reviews" based on a weighted average score of 63 out of 100 from 28 critic scores. AllMusic's David Jeffries praised Eminem's performance as potent and energetic, and said that the album "may be flawed ... but he hasn't sounded this unfiltered and proud since The Marshall Mathers LP". Neil McCormick of The Daily Telegraph commended him for addressing more mature, introspective subject matter and successfully "framing his misogyny, homophobia and all-round bigotry with an undeniable sense of empathy and humanity." Jody Rosen, writing in Rolling Stone, called it Eminem's "most casual-sounding album in years" and said that he "sounds content to be rap's wittiest head case."

Sam Wolfson of NME called him "self aware, technically advanced, intelligent, able to go at speeds other than full throttle." Sean O'Neal of The A.V. Club stated that his lively raps make up for the "endless atonement metaphors" that occasionally weigh down the album. Kitty Empire, writing in The Observer, said that it is "better than average" as a "latterday Eminem album" that shows, "in bursts, Eminem's health is very nearly rude." MSN Music's Robert Christgau said that, although the cleverness "varies" and the themes are "rarely" upheld by his "long-recessive sense of play", the album is a comeback "for Eminem, not Slim Shady—and for Marshall at his most martial. His most confessional as well."

In a mixed review, Jon Caramanica of The New York Times regarded Eminem as "frustratingly limited in his topical range" and called Recovery "the most insular of all his releases." Andy Gill of The Independent commented that "there's nothing here quite as witty or engaging as" on his previous work. In a largely negative review, Pitchfork's Jayson Greene perceived a lack of lyrical depth and wrote "for the first time in his career, he actually sounds clumsy." Chicago Tribune writer Greg Kot criticized the writing, and said that it lacks hooks and fun: "The subversive humor is long gone, and his cultural references ... remain dated." Slant Magazine's M. T. Richards also found Eminem's pop culture references "inane" and called the album's material "unsurprisingly hollow" with punchlines that "rarely resonate." Los Angeles Times writer Jeff Weiss found his rhyme schemes "dazzling" and wordplay "clever", but panned its production as "monochromatic and monotonous." The Guardian's Paul MacInnes said that the music lacks consistency because of a "piecemeal approach to production" and "fashionable soft-rock samples."

Recovery was ranked 93rd on the Billboard Top 200 Albums of All Time.

In a 2024 ranking of Eminem's 12 studio albums, Damien Scott of Billboard magazine placed Recovery fourth, writing: "Recovery doesn't sound like a man trying to reclaim past glories—instead it sounds like an artist excited for his present and amped for his future." Scott highlighted the tracks "Not Afraid", "No Love", and "Love the Way You Lie", concluding: "When taken all together, the album acts both as an end to one era of Eminem's career and the start of the one we've been in now for the past five albums."

=== Accolades ===
List of awards and nominations
Year	Ceremony	Award	Result
2010	American Music Awards (38th)	Favorite Rap/Hip-Hop Album	Won
2010	American Music Awards (38th)	Favorite Pop/Rock Album	Nominated
2011	Billboard Music Award (2011)	Top Billboard 200 Album	Won
2011	Billboard Music Award (2011)	Top Rap Album	Won
2011	Brit Awards (2011)	Best International Album	Nominated
2011	Detroit Music Awards	Outstanding National Major Label Recording	Won
2011	Grammy Awards (53rd)	Album of the Year	Nominated
2011	Grammy Awards (53rd)	Best Rap Album	Won
2011	Juno Awards	International Album of the Year	Nominated
2011	MTV Video Music Awards Japan (2011)	Album of the Year	Nominated

List of year-end rankings by critics
Publication	Country	Accolade	Year	Rank
Rolling Stone	United States	Best Albums of 2010	2010	9
Spin	United States	40 Best Albums list for 2010	2010	38
Complex	United States	The 25 Best Albums Of 2010	2012	3

Other lists
Publication	Country	Accolade	Year	Rank
Complex	United States	Soulja Boy's 25 Favorite Albums Of All Time	2010	14
Complex	United States	The 20 Best Comebacks in Rap History	2012	4
Complex	United States	The 100 Best Albums of the Complex Decade	2012	98

== Commercial performance ==
The album debuted at number one on the US Billboard 200 chart, with first-week sales of 741,000 copies. It became Eminem's sixth album to debut at number one in the United States. In its second week of release it remained at number-one and sold 313,000 copies. It also entered at number one on Billboard's R&B/Hip-Hop Albums and Rap Albums chart. In its ninth week of release the album remained at number one for its seventh non-consecutive week and sold 116,000 copies. By March 2011, the album was number one on the all-time list of albums with the most digital sales, with over 922,000 copies digitally sold at the time. As of July 2011, the album broke the digital record and became the first album to sell one million digital copies. It held the record for most digital albums sold, but was later outsold by Adele's 21 album. On August 18, 2011, the album was certified triple platinum by the Recording Industry Association of America in shipments and sales. As of November 13, 2013, the album has sold 4,513,000 copies in the United States and by August 6, 2018, the album hit nearly 4,830,000. Since its United States release, the album spent a total of 27 weeks in the top 10 of the Billboard 200, which is more than any other hip-hop album since 2003. It spent seven weeks at number one in both the US & UK amongst other nations.

The album debuted at number one on the UK Albums Chart, selling 140,000 copies in its first week in the United Kingdom. In Canada, the album sold 85,000 copies in its first week and debuted at number one on Canada's Albums Chart. The album spent six consecutive weeks at number one, and retook the top spot after one week at number two. As of January 2020, the album has sold 613,000 copies in Canada. In Japan, Oricon recorded a debut of number six with 20,678 units sold. It also went gold in its first week in New Zealand and Australia, debuting at number one in both countries. The album has since sold over 210,000 copies in Australia, certifying it triple platinum.

By the end of its release year, Recovery had sold over 5.7 million copies worldwide. It was one of the best-selling album of 2010 in the United States with 3.4 million copies, and it had sold 2.3 million copies in other territories for a total of 5.7 million copies worldwide by December 2010. According to the International Federation of the Phonographic Industry, it was also the best-selling album of 2010 worldwide. The album was the best-selling album in Canada in 2010 selling 435,000 copies; more than double the album in second place. Recovery was the third best-selling album of 2010 in Australia.

== Track listing ==
Standard edition
No.	Title	Writer(s)	Produced by	Length
1.	"Cold Wind Blows"	Marshall Mathers; Justin Smith; Simon Byrne; Henry Marsh; John Perry; Casey Synge	Just Blaze	5:03
2.	"Talkin' 2 Myself" (featuring Kobe)	Mathers; Khalil Rahman; Pranam Injeti; Brian Honeycutt	DJ Khalil	5:00
3.	"On Fire"	Mathers; Denaun Porter; Carlos Wilson; Lou Wilson; Ric Wilson	Mr. Porter	3:33
4.	"Won't Back Down" (featuring Pink)	Mathers; Rahman; Erik Alcock; Liz Rodrigues; Columbus Smith	DJ Khalil	4:25
5.	"W.T.P."	Mathers; Luis Resto; Dwayne Chin-Quee; Jason Gilbert	Supa Dups; Jason "JG" Gilbert^{[a]}; Eminem^{[b]}	3:58
6.	"Going Through Changes"	Mathers; Emile Haynie; John Osbourne; Anthony Iommi; WT Ward; Terence Butler	Emile	4:58
7.	"Not Afraid"	Mathers; Resto; Matthew Samuels; Jordan Evans; Matthew Burnett	Boi-1da; Evans^{[b]}; Burnett^{[b]}; Eminem^{[b]}	4:08
8.	"Seduction"	Mathers; Samuels; Burnett; Sly Jordan	Boi-1da; Burnett^{[b]}	4:35
9.	"No Love" (featuring Lil Wayne)	Mathers; Dwayne Carter; J. Smith; Dee Dee Halligan; Junior Torello	Just Blaze	4:59
10.	"Space Bound"	Mathers; James Scheffer; Steve McEwan	Jim Jonsin	4:38
11.	"Cinderella Man"	Mathers	Script Shepherd	4:39
12.	"25 to Life"	Mathers; Rahman; Rodrigues; Danny Tannenbaum	DJ Khalil	4:01
13.	"So Bad"	Mathers; Andre Young; Mark Batson; Dawaun Parker; Trevor Lawrence; Sean Cruse; Nick Brongers	Dr. Dre; Nick Brongers	5:25
14.	"Almost Famous"	Mathers; Rahman; Rodrigues; Alcock; Injeti; Tannenbaum	DJ Khalil	4:52
15.	"Love the Way You Lie" (featuring Rihanna)	Mathers; Alexander Grant; Holly Hafermann	Alex da Kid; Makeba Riddick^{[c]}	4:23
16.	"You're Never Over"	Mathers; J. Smith; Mike Mainieri; Gerard McMahon	Just Blaze	5:05
17.	"Untitled" (hidden track)	Mathers; Kejuan Muchita; Michael Crawford; John Medora; David White	Havoc; Magnedo7^{[a]}	3:14
Total length:				77:08

Deluxe edition
No.	Title	Writer(s)	Produced by	Length
18.	"Ridaz"	Mathers; Young	Dr. Dre	5:00
19.	"Session One" (featuring Slaughterhouse)	Mathers; Ryan Montgomery; Joell Ortiz; Dominick Wickliffe; Smith	Just Blaze	4:28
Total length:				86:36

Notes

- ^{^[a]} indicates a co-producer
- ^{^[b]} indicates an additional producer
- ^{^[c]} indicates a vocal producer
- "Cold Wind Blows" features additional vocals by Nikki Grier
- "Space Bound" features additional vocals by Steve McEwan
- "Cinderella Man" features uncredited vocals by Kobe
- "25 to Life" and "Almost Famous" feature additional vocals by Liz Rodrigues
- "So Bad" features additional vocals by Sly Jordan
- iTunes Store deluxe edition includes the bonus music video of "Not Afraid".

Sample credits

- "Cold Wind Blows" contains an interpolation of "Patriotic Song", written by Simon Byrne, Henry Marsh, John Perry, and Casey Synge, and performed by The Gringo.
- "On Fire" contains samples of "Peace and Love (Amani Na Mapenzi)", written by Carlos Wilson, Lou Wilson, and Ric Wilson, and performed by Mandrill.
- "Going Through Changes" contains samples of "Changes", written by Terence Butler, Anthony Iommi, John Osbourne, WT Ward, and performed by Black Sabbath.
- "No Love" contains samples of "What Is Love", written by Dee Dee Halligan and Junior Torello, and performed by Haddaway.
- "Love the Way You Lie" contains elements from "Love the Way You Lie" performed and written by Skylar Grey.
- "You're Never Over" contains samples of "Cry Little Sister", written by Michael Mainieri Jr. and Gerard McMann, and performed by Gerard McMann.
- "Untitled" contains samples of "You Don't Own Me", written by John Madara and Dave White, and performed by Lesley Gore.
- "Session One" contains dialogue from "Charlie Murphy vs. Rick James (Part 2)" from Chappelle's Show.

== Personnel ==
Credits for Recovery adapted from AllMusic.

Musicians

- Eminem – vocals
- Erik Alcock – guitar
- Mark Batson – keyboards
- Kip Blackshire – vocals, chorus
- Matthew Burnett – strings
- Kristen Ashley Cole – vocals, chorus
- Sean Cruse – guitar
- Terry Dexter – vocals, chorus
- Jordan Evans – strings
- Christal Garrick II – vocals, chorus
- Nikki Grier – vocals
- Chin Injeti – bass, guitar
- Jim Jonsin – keyboards
- Sly Jordan – saxophone, vocals, chorus
- Danny Keyz – keyboards
- Rich King – vocals, chorus
- Trevor Lawrence – keyboards
- Steve McEwan – guitar, vocals on (track 10)
- Danny Morris – keyboards
- Dawaun Parker – keyboards
- Rahki – keyboards
- Khalil Abdul Rahman – keyboards
- Luis Resto – keyboards
- Liz Rodrigues – vocals
- Daniel Seeff – guitar
- Mike Strange – acoustic guitar, bass, guitar, keyboards

Technical

- Julian Alexander – art direction, design
- Boi-1da – producer, engineer
- Nick Brongers – producer
- Matthew Burnett – additional production
- Damon "Bing" Chatman – assistant coordinator
- Larry Chatman – production coordination, project coordinator
- Christian Clancy – marketing
- Kal "Boogie" Dellaportas – engineer
- DJ Khalil – producer
- DJ Mormile – A&R
- Dr. Dre – producer, executive producer, mixing
- Eminem – mixing, additional production
- Jordan Evans – additional production
- John Fisher – studio manager
- Michael Gamble – engineer
- Brian "Big Bass" Gardner – mastering
- Havoc – producer
- Emile Haynie – producer
- Howie Herbst – assistant engineer
- Matt Huber – assistant engineer
- Mauricio Iragorri – engineer
- Joe Strange – engineer, assistant engineer
- Jim Jonsin – programming, producer
- Just Blaze – producer, mixing
- Alex Da Kid – producer, mixing
- Spike Lindsey – assistant engineer
- Nick Low-Beer – drum machine programming
- Magnedo7 – producer
- Deborah Mannis-Gardner – sample clearance
- Robert Marks – engineer
- Rob Marks – mixing
- Tracy McNew – A&R
- Alex Merzin – engineer
- Mr. Porter – producer
- Nigel Parry – photography
- Chris "Trife" Patilis – assistant engineer
- Kirdis Postelle – project coordinator
- Dwayne "Supa Dups" Chin Quee – drumset, producer, engineer
- Rahki – programming
- Robert Reyes – assistant engineer, vocal engineer
- Makeba Riddick – vocal producer
- Paul D. Rosenberg – executive producer
- Jason Sangerman – marketing coordinator
- Les Scurry – production coordination
- Script Shepherd – producer
- Manny Smith – A&R
- Mike Strange – engineer, mixing
- Marcos Tovar – engineer
- Ryan West – engineer, mixing
- Jason Wilkie – assistant engineer
- Ianthe Zevos – creative director

== Charts ==
=== Weekly charts ===
Chart (2010)	Peak position
Australian Albums (ARIA)	1
Australian Hip-Hop/R&B Albums (ARIA)	1
Austrian Albums (Ö3 Austria)	1
Belgian Albums (Ultratop Flanders)	2
Belgian Albums (Ultratop Wallonia)	2
Canadian Albums (Billboard)	1
Czech Albums (ČNS IFPI)	8
Danish Albums (Hitlisten)	1
Dutch Albums (Album Top 100)	2
European Top 100 Albums (Billboard)	1
Finnish Albums (Suomen virallinen lista)	8
French Albums (SNEP)	2
German Albums (Offizielle Top 100)	2
Greek Albums (IFPI)	1
Hungarian Albums (MAHASZ)	20
Irish Albums (IRMA)	1
Italian Albums (FIMI)	6
Japanese Albums (Oricon)	6
Mexican Albums (AMPROFON)	34
New Zealand Albums (RMNZ)	1
Norwegian Albums (VG-lista)	2
Polish Albums (ZPAV)	2
Russian Albums (2M)	2
Scottish Albums (Official Charts)	1
South African Albums (RISA)	1
South Korean Albums (Circle)	6
South Korean International Albums (Circle)	2
Spanish Albums (Promusicae)	13
Swedish Albums (Sverigetopplistan)	5
Swiss Albums (Schweizer Hitparade)	1
Taiwan International Albums (G-Music)	2
UK Albums (Official Charts)	1
UK R&B Albums (Official Charts)	1
US Billboard 200	1
US Top Rap Albums (Billboard)	1
US Top R&B/Hip-Hop Albums (Billboard)	1

Chart (2017)	Peak position
Slovak Albums (ČNS IFPI)	81

=== Year-end charts ===
Chart (2010)	Position
Australian Albums (ARIA)	3
Australian Hip Hop/R&B Albums (ARIA)	1
Austrian Albums (Ö3 Austria)	4
Belgian Albums (Ultratop Flanders)	20
Belgian Alternative Albums (Ultratop Flanders)	10
Belgian Albums (Ultratop Wallonia)	76
Canadian Albums (Billboard)	1
Croatian International Albums (HDU)	14
Danish Albums (Hitlisten)	12
Dutch Albums (Album Top 100)	32
European Top 100 Albums (Billboard)	4
French Albums (SNEP)	40
German Albums (Offizielle Top 100)	12
Irish Albums (IRMA)	13
Italian Albums (FIMI)	66
Japanese Albums (Oricon)	94
Mexican Albums (AMPROFON)	95
New Zealand Albums (RMNZ)	5
Polish Albums (ZPAV)	34
Russian Albums (2M)	22
South Korean International Albums (Circle)	8
Swedish Albums (Sverigetopplistan)	57
Swedish Albums & Compilations (Sverigetopplistan)	84
Swiss Albums (Schweizer Hitparade)	3
UK Albums (OCC)	9
US Billboard 200	2
US Digital Albums (Billboard)	1
US Top Rap Albums (Billboard)	1
US Top R&B/Hip-Hop Albums (Billboard)	1
Worldwide Albums (IFPI)	1

Chart (2011)	Position
Australian Albums (ARIA)	45
Australian Hip Hop/R&B Albums (ARIA)	7
Canadian Albums (Billboard)	19
South Korean International Albums (Circle)	63
UK Albums (OCC)	112
US Billboard 200	13
US Digital Albums (Billboard)	14
US Top Rap Albums (Billboard)	4
US Top R&B/Hip-Hop Albums (Billboard)	5

Chart (2012)	Position
Australian Hip Hop/R&B Albums (ARIA)	28
South Korean International Albums (Circle)	95
US Billboard 200	103
US Catalog Albums (Billboard)	10
US Top R&B/Hip-Hop Albums (Billboard)	99

Chart (2013)	Position
Australian Hip Hop/R&B Albums (ARIA)	35
US Billboard 200	199
US Catalog Albums (Billboard)	16

Chart (2014)	Position
Swedish Albums (Sverigetopplistan)	96

Chart (2015)	Position
Australian Hip Hop/R&B Albums (ARIA)	35
US Billboard 200	175

Chart (2016)	Position
Australian Hip Hop/R&B Albums (ARIA)	30
US Billboard 200	148

Chart (2017)	Position
Australian Hip Hop/R&B Albums (ARIA)	32
US Billboard 200	168
US Catalog Albums (Billboard)	49

Chart (2018)	Position
Australian Hip Hop/R&B Albums (ARIA)	40

Chart (2019)	Position
Australian Hip Hop/R&B Albums (ARIA)	39

=== Decade-end charts ===
Chart (2010–2019)	Position
Australian Albums (ARIA)	17
UK Albums (OCC)	43
US Billboard 200	23
US Top R&B/Hip-Hop Albums (Billboard)	3

== Certifications and sales ==
Certifications for Recovery
Region	Certification	Certified units/sales
Australia (ARIA)	5× Platinum	350,000^{‡}
Austria (IFPI Austria)	2× Platinum	40,000^{*}
Belgium (BRMA)	Gold	15,000^{*}
Canada (Music Canada)	Platinum	613,000
Denmark (IFPI Danmark)	4× Platinum	80,000^{‡}
France (SNEP)	Platinum	100,000^{*}
GCC (IFPI Middle East)	Gold	3,000^{*}
Germany (BVMI)	3× Gold	300,000^{‡}
Ireland (IRMA)	3× Platinum	45,000^{^}
Italy (FIMI)	2× Platinum	100,000^{‡}
Japan (RIAJ)	Gold	100,000^{^}
New Zealand (RMNZ)	4× Platinum	60,000^{‡}
Poland (ZPAV)	2× Platinum	40,000^{‡}
Russia (NFPF)	Platinum	10,000^{*}
Singapore (RIAS)	Platinum	10,000^{*}
South Africa (RISA)	Platinum	40,000^{*}
Sweden (GLF)	2× Platinum	80,000^{‡}
Switzerland (IFPI Switzerland)	Platinum	30,000^{^}
United Kingdom (BPI)	4× Platinum	1,200,000^{‡}
United States (RIAA)	8× Platinum	8,000,000^{‡}
Summaries
Europe (IFPI)	Platinum	1,000,000^{*}
^{*} Sales figures based on certification alone.^{^} Shipments figures based on certification alone.^{‡} Sales+streaming figures based on certification alone.

== Release history ==
Region	Date	Label	Format	Catalog	Ref
Australia	June 18, 2010	Aftermath; Shady; Interscope	CD; digital download	2739452	
European Union (excluding the UK)	June 18, 2010	Polydor	CD; digital download		
United Kingdom	June 21, 2010	Polydor	CD; digital download	B003KUSUG8	
United States	June 21, 2010	Aftermath; Shady; Interscope	CD; digital download	B0014411	
Japan	June 23, 2010	Universal Music	CD; digital download	UICS1214	
Brazil	July 6, 2010	Universal Music	CD; digital download	602527394527	
