= Shade 45 =

Hip hop digital radio station

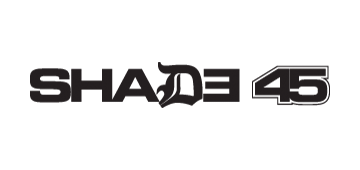
- Broadcast area: United States; Canada
- Frequencies: Sirius XM Radio 45; Dish Network 6045
- Branding: xL Shade 45

Programming
- Format: Mainstream Urban; Eminem's uncut hip hop

Ownership
- Owner: Sirius XM Radio

History
- First air date: October 28, 2004
- Former names: Raw (2001-2008)
- Former frequencies: XM 66

Technical information
- Class: Satellite radio station

Links
- Website: Shade 45

Shade 45 is American rapper Eminem's hip-hop station on Sirius XM Radio channel 45 and Dish Network channel 6045.

== History ==
Eminem established his channel, Shade 45, that plays uncut hip-hop. The station was developed in partnership between Eminem, his manager Paul Rosenberg, and Sirius Satellite Radio to provide a platform for uncensored hip-hop that was often overlooked by commercial terrestrial radio.

Eminem promoted the station in a 2004 mock national convention (the "Shady National Convention") at the Roseland Ballroom in New York City, in which Donald Trump endorsed him. On his album Revival (2017), Eminem expressed his regret at having collaborated with Trump, rapping, "wish I would have spit on it before I went to shake his hand at the event" on the song "Like Home".

In 2011, Eminem established a new morning show, Sway in the Morning with Sway Calloway, which airs at 8:00 a.m., Monday–Friday. The show has become a staple for freestyle rap, including the "Hyena" segment where rappers perform live in the studio.

Shade 45 personality Lord Sear, a hip hop DJ who had been with the station for over 20 years, died in March 2026.

Currently, Tony Neal’s Core DJ Radio is the longest running show (19 years it premiered toward the end of Nov 2006) on Shade 45, which airs at 12am ET Friday nights (Saturday).

== Core artists ==
- Eminem
- Kendrick Lamar
- J.Cole
- ScHoolboy Q
- Tech N9ne
- Nas
- Kanye West
- Dr. Dre
- Drake
- 50 Cent
- Travis Scott
- Action Bronson
- Wiz Khalifa
- Big Sean
- Yelawolf

== DJs and Hosts ==
- Sway Calloway M-F 9am-12pm ET
- Heather B M-F 9am-12pm ET
- DJ Drama Friday 8pm ET
- Tony Neal, CEO Core DJs (Friday Nights(Sat) 12a-2am ET
- DJ Superstar Jay
- DJ Whoo Kid Various Times

== See also ==
- List of Sirius XM Radio channels
