= Michael Wallis =

American writer (born 1945)

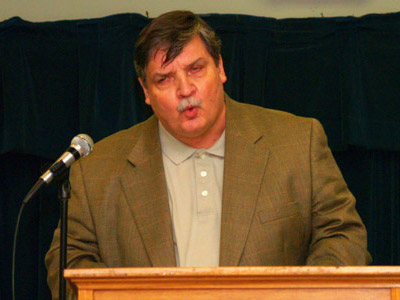
- Wallis in 2008
- Born: October 7, 1945 (age 81); St. Louis, Missouri, U.S.
- Education: Western Military Academy; University of Missouri
- Occupations: Journalist; popular historian; author; speaker
- Years active: 1965–present
- Spouse: Suzanne Fitzgerald Wallis
- Website: http://www.michaelwallis.com/

Michael Wallis (born October 7, 1945) is an American journalist, popular historian, author and speaker. He has written seventeen books, including Route 66: The Mother Road, about the historic highway U.S. Route 66. His work has also been published extensively in magazines and newspapers, including Time, Life, People, Smithsonian, The New Yorker, and The New York Times. Wallis is also the voice of Sheriff in the Disney/Pixar franchise Cars.

== Awards and honors ==
Wallis has received the John Steinbeck Award, the Arrell Gibson Lifetime Achievement Award from the Oklahoma Center for the Book, the Will Rogers Spirit Award, and the Western Heritage Award from the National Cowboy Hall & Western Heritage Museum. He has been inducted into the Oklahoma Writers Hall of Fame, Writers Hall of Fame of America, and the Oklahoma Historians Hall of Fame, and was the first inductee into the Oklahoma Route 66 Hall of Fame.

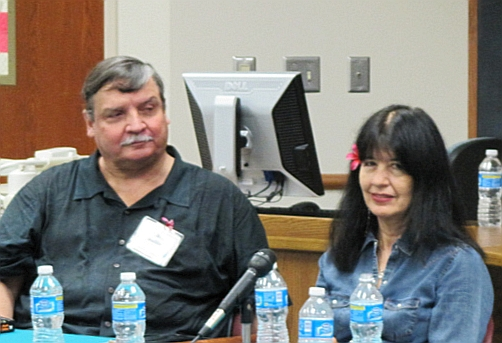
Michael Wallis with Joy Harjo in 2010

Wallis was interviewed by Rep. Roy Blunt (R-Missouri) for After Words on Book TV, 29 April 2007, discussing his latest book, Billy the Kid: The Endless Ride.

== Other work ==
Wallis also provided the voice of Sheriff in the Disney·Pixar Cars franchise.

== Personal life ==
Wallis was born in St. Louis, Missouri. He graduated from Western Military Academy in Alton, Illinois, in 1963. He later attended the University of Missouri in Columbia, and moved to Miami, Florida, in 1978, where he worked for Time's Caribbean Bureau. He currently lives in Tulsa, Oklahoma, with his wife, Suzanne Fitzgerald Wallis.

== Bibliography ==
- Belle Starr: The Truth Behind the Wild West Legend. Liveright Publishing Corporation. 2025. ISBN 9781631494772.
- The Best Land Under Heaven: The Donner Party in the Age of Manifest Destiny. Liveright Publishing Corporation. 2017. ISBN 978-0871407696.
- David Crockett: The Lion of the West. W. W. Norton & Company. 2011. ISBN 9780393067583.
- The Wild West: 365 Days. Abrams. 2011. ISBN 9780810996892.
- Billy the Kid: The Endless Ride. W. W. Norton & Company. 2008. ISBN 9780393330632.
- The Lincoln Highway: Coast to Coast from Times Square to the Golden Gate. W. W. Norton & Company. 2007. ISBN 9780393059380.
- The Real Wild West: The 101 Ranch and the Creation of the American West. St. Martin's Press. 1999. ISBN 9780312192860.
- Way Down Yonder in the Indian Nation. St. Martin's Press. 1997. ISBN 9780312152420.
- Oil Man: The Story Of Frank Phillips & The Birth Of Phillips Petroleum. St. Martin's Griffin. 1995. ISBN 9780312131357.
- Mankiller: A Chief and Her People. St. Martin's Press. 1994. ISBN 9780312206628.
- Pretty Boy: The Life and Times of Charles Arthur Floyd. W. W. Norton & Company. 1992. ISBN 9780312072490.
- Route 66: The Mother Road 75th Anniversary Edition. W. W. Norton & Company. 1990. ISBN 9780312040499.

== Filmography ==
=== Film ===
- American Traditions: A Journey Down Route 66 (1994, documentary) host and guide (commentator)
- Cars (2006) as Sheriff (voice)
- Mater and the Ghostlight (2006, video short) as Sheriff (voice)
- Cars 2 (2011) as Sheriff (voice)
- Voices of History (2014, short) as Narrator (voice)
- Cars 3 (2017) as Sheriff (voice)

=== Television ===
- Cars Toons (2008–2014, 2 episodes) as Sheriff (voice)
- Cruisin' Route 66 with Michael Wallis 2007 (Season 1, 12–24 minute episodes) with updates from the 1994 show about Route 66 the Mother Road.
- Cars: Lightning Racers (2027, Upcoming series) as Sheriff (voice)

=== Video games ===
- Cars (2006) as Sheriff (voice)
- Cars Mater-National Championship (2007) as Sheriff (voice)
- Cars Race-O-Rama (2009) as Sheriff (voice)
- Cars 2: The Video Game (2011) as Sheriff (voice)
- Kinect Rush: A Disney-Pixar Adventure (2012) as Sheriff (voice)

=== Theme park attractions ===
- Radiator Springs Racers (2012) as Sheriff
