= Cars 2: The Video Game =

2011 racing video game

Cars 2
- Developer: Avalanche Software TransGaming (OS X) Firebrand Games (Nintendo DS, Nintendo 3DS) Virtual Toys (PlayStation Portable) Disney Mobile Studios (iOS)
- Publisher: Disney Interactive Studios Sony Computer Entertainment (PSP) Disney Mobile Studios (iOS)
- Series: Cars
- Platforms: PlayStation 3 Xbox 360; Microsoft Windows; Wii; Nintendo DS; Nintendo 3DS; PlayStation Portable; OS X iOS
- Release: PlayStation 3, Xbox 360, Microsoft Windows, OS X, Wii: NA: June 21, 2011; AU: July 1, 2011; EU: July 15, 2011; ESP: July 23, 2011; RUS: August 22, 2011; PlayStation Portable: NA: July 10, 2011; AU: July 12, 2011; EU: August 8, 2011; RUS: December 26, 2011; Nintendo 3DS: NA: September 14, 2011; EU: October 12, 2011; AU: September 17, 2011; JP: October 27, 2011; Arcade: NA: May 3, 2013; EU: May 26, 2013; AU: June 1, 2013; RUS: June 15, 2013; JP: June 21, 2013
- Genre: Racing
- Modes: Single-player, multiplayer

Cars 2 (also known as Cars 2: The Video Game) is a 2011 racing game based on the 2011 film of the same name. It is the sixth video game in the Cars franchise, following Cars Race-O-Rama (2009). Originally announced at E3 2011, the game was released by Disney Interactive Studios on all major platforms in North America on June 21, 2011, three days before the film itself released nationwide and internationally, and in Australia two days later. The game was released in Europe on July 22, 2011. Versions for the Nintendo 3DS and PlayStation Portable were released later that year on November 1 and November 11, respectively. The game features an array of Cars characters competing in spy adventures, as well as racing. The game received positive reviews from critics.

== Gameplay ==
Cars 2 features most of the characters from its film counterpart such as Francesco Bernoulli and Max Schnell as seen above, with additional characters from both films available for the PlayStation 3 and Xbox 360 via downloadable content.

Cars 2 is a third-person racing game. Players have the choice of 25 different characters and train to become world-class spies. As part of training, players participate in missions using high-tech gadgets, for example, to avoid enemies or slow them down. Unlike the first game, free roam mode does not return.

The game has three types of trophies: bronze, silver, and gold. Points are awarded at different values depending on what type of vehicle class players use. The game characters are divided into three weight-classes: heavy, medium, and light. Players can unlock new cars, tracks, and missions by collecting emblems. Drop-in/drop-out multiplayer modes support up to four players simultaneously.

== Synopsis ==
Based on Pixar's animated film, Cars 2: The Video Game follows the exploits of car characters Lightning McQueen and Tow Mater as they train in a secret facility known as CHROME (Command Headquarters for Recon Operations and Motorized Espionage) They are joined by British Intelligence agents Finn McMissile and Holley Shiftwell as they attempt to become the car-equivalent of spies. Several characters from the Cars 2 film appear, with additional characters from the first film and Cars Toons animated shorts available as downloadable content.

== Development ==
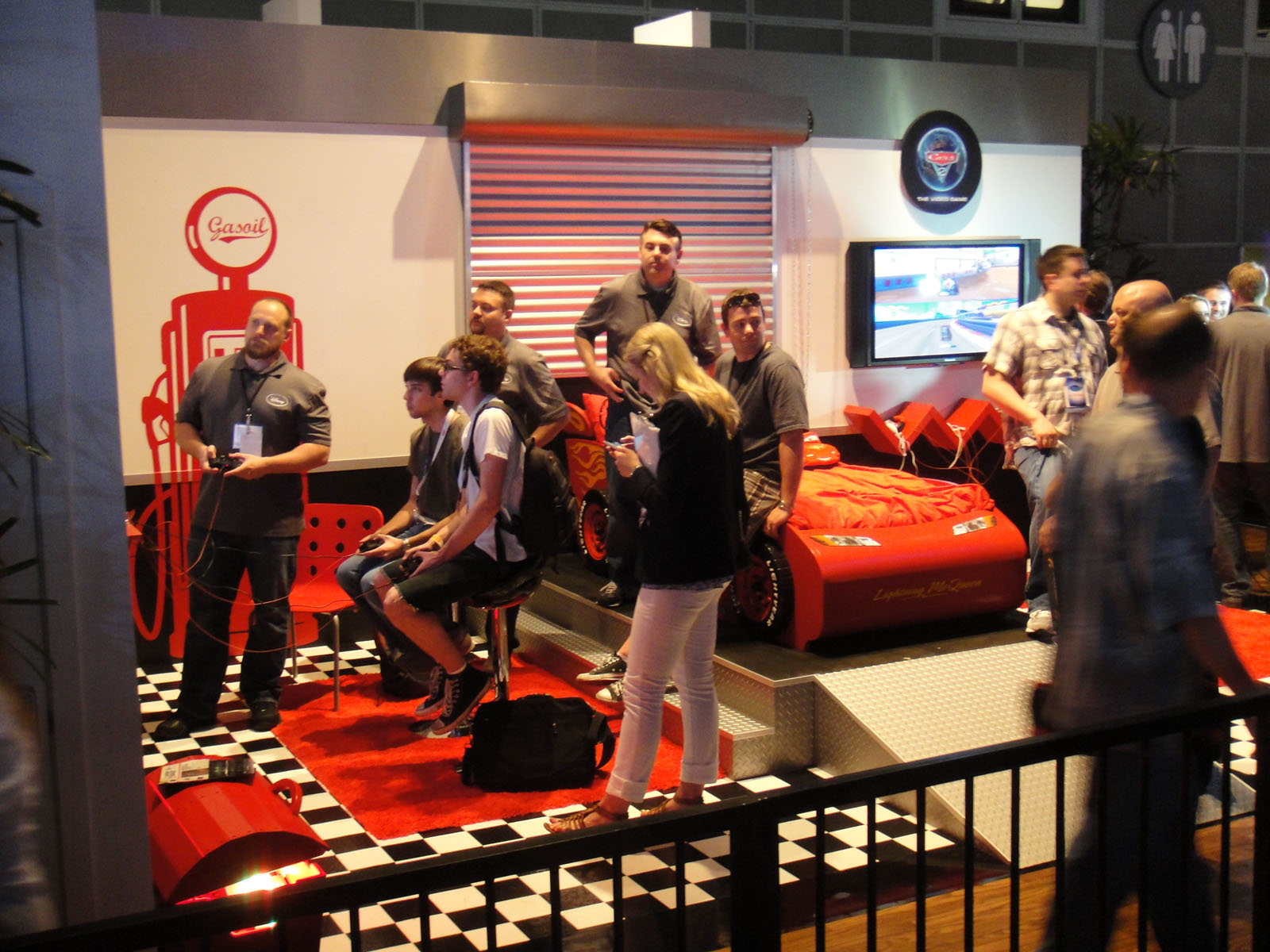
Cars 2 was unveiled during E3 2011. A playable demo was presented in a Cars-styled booth.

The game was first shown to the public at E3 2011. It was also unveiled at the American International Toy Fair in New York City. According to a video interview on Game Line, producer John Day said they wanted to create a good family racing game and add a few things that perhaps no one has seen before. Avalanche Software was working in close collaboration with Pixar artists to bring the humor and personality of the feature film to life.

== Reception ==
Reception

Aggregate score
Aggregator	Score
Metacritic	DS: 58/100; PC: 65/100; PS3: 74/100; WII: 69/100; X360: 72/100; 3DS: 58/100

Review scores
Publication	Score
Eurogamer	7/10
Game Informer	7.75/10
GamePro	4/5
GameSpot	7.5/10
IGN	8/10 (DS) 6.5/10
Nintendo World Report	(WII) 6.5/10 (3DS) 5.5/10
Official Xbox Magazine (US)	7.5/10
The Guardian	4/5
VideoGamer.com	7/10

In contrast to the film’s mixed reviews, Cars 2 received positive reviews from critics, with a score of 72 and 74 on Metacritic for the Xbox 360 and PlayStation 3 versions respectively. IGN gave the game an 8 out of 10 rating, stating that "Cars 2 is a great multiplayer game that rivals Mario Kart." The Official Xbox Magazine gave it a 7.5 out of 10 rating, praising fun and polished racing but criticizing the fact that online play was missing from the title. Game Informer gave the title a 7.75 out of 10 rating, calling it a satisfying racing experience. GameSpot's Justin Calvert gave it a 7.5 out of 10 rating, praising its career mode and track designs. He was, however, upset that there was no online mode as expected and also no free roam unlike its predecessors.
