= Cars on the Road =

Disney+ series

- Genre: Comedy; Adventure
- Based on: Cars by: John Lasseter; Joe Ranft; Jorgen Klubien
- Developed by: Steve Purcell
- Voices of: Owen Wilson; Larry the Cable Guy
- Theme music composer: Bobby Podesta; Jake Monaco
- Opening theme: "Cars on the Road" by Bobby Hamrick
- Composer: Jake Monaco
- Country of origin: United States
- Original language: English
- No. of seasons: 1
- No. of episodes: 9

Production
- Executive producers: Kevin Reher; Katherine Sarafian; Dan Scanlon
- Producer: Marc Sondheimer
- Cinematography: Robert Anderson; Laura Grieve
- Editors: Jason Brodkey; Serena Warner
- Running time: 8 minutes
- Production company: Pixar Animation Studios

Original release
- Network: Disney+
- Release: September 8, 2022

Related
- Cars Toons (2008–2014)

Cars on the Road is an American animated miniseries produced by Pixar Animation Studios for the Disney+ streaming service and based on the Cars franchise. The main cast includes Owen Wilson as Lightning McQueen and Larry the Cable Guy as Mater. The series is written by Steve Purcell and produced by Marc Sondheimer. Set after the events of Cars 3 (2017), Cars on the Road follows Lightning and Mater on a road trip to attend the wedding of Mater's sister, while visiting various locations and characters along the way.

The short series was announced in December 2020, during Disney's Investor Day. Sondheimer says the directors worked together to maintain continuity within the series. The title was revealed in November 2021, during Pixar's special for 2021's Disney+ Day. Concepts for the episodes include stories which pay homage to films such as Mad Max (1979) and The Shining (1980). The production designer altered the lighting to further evoke Ray Harryhausen's films. Production for the series took place over 15 months. Jake Monaco provided the score for all nine episodes, who also co-wrote the series' title theme song with Bobby Podesta, performed by Bobby Hamrick.

Cars on the Road premiered on September 8, 2022, as part of Disney+ Day. The series received positive reviews for its vocal performances, messages, humor, role models and homages to pop culture.

== Premise ==
Some time after the events of Cars 3 (2017), Lightning McQueen & Mater embark on a cross-country road trip around the United States to attend the wedding of Mater's sister, Mato. Along the way, they come across various locations and characters old and new.

== Voice cast ==
- Owen Wilson as Lightning McQueen
- Larry the Cable Guy as Mater
- Quinta Brunson as Ivy
- Bonnie Hunt as Sally Carrera
- Jenifer Lewis as Flo
- Cheech Marin as Ramone
- Lloyd Sherr as Fillmore
- Tony Shalhoub as Luigi
- Guido Quaroni as Guido
- Tania Gunadi as Lisa
- Ruth Livier as Louise
- Steve Purcell as Randy / Wraith Rod
- Matthew Yang King as Clutch Humboldt / Wraith Rod / Crew Pitty
- Kathy Holly as Speed Demon
- Masa Kanome as Noriyuki
- Toks Olagundoye as Margaret Motorray / Chiefess
- Gabby Sanalitro as Griswold
- Megan Cavanagh as Mae Pillar-Durev / Bella Cadavre
- Hayden Bishop as Kay Pillar-Durev / 1st AD
- Secunda Wood as Brakelight Pictures' producer
- Matt Lowe as Brakelight Pictures' crew members
- Zeno Robinson as Lance the Writer / Jeremy
- Dave Fennoy as Town Marshall / Justice Stern
- Tom Bromhead as Cap'n Long Leggy
- Debra Cardona as Squat
- Cristela Alonzo as Cruz Ramirez
- Dana Powell as Mato
- Oscar Camacho as Mateo

The episode "Trucks" features Kara Lee Britz, Jessica Childress, John Edwards, Eden Espinosa, Crystal Monee Hall, James Harper, Jeff Lewis, Kyle Taylor Parker, Joe Santoni, Elizabeth Stanley, Ryan Vasquez, Brooke Villanyi, and Windy Wagner as the voices of the trucks.

== Episodes ==
| No. | Title | Directed by | Written by | Storyboard by | Original release date |
|---|---|---|---|---|---|
| 1 | "Dino Park" | Steve Purcell | Steve Purcell | Brian Fee, Bobby Podesta, Lane Lueras, Steve Purcell & J. Garret Sheldew | September 8, 2022 |
Sometime after Lightning McQueen became Cruz Ramirez’s trainer by winning the Florida 500, Mater informs his friends at Radiator Springs that he'll be leaving the town for a few days to attend the wedding of his sister, Mato. Lightning offers to accompany him, and the two go on a road trip to the wedding. At Lightning's insistence, the two stop at a dinosaur-car museum, where Mater is uninterested by the dinosaur-car statues. Mater becomes bored and falls asleep during an educational lecture, and dreams of him and Lightning as the cavecars, being attacked by the dinosaur-cars. He later wakes up, feeling educated thanks to his dream, before leaving the park with Lightning.
| 2 | "Lights Out" | Steve Purcell | Steve Purcell & Marty Isenberg | Brian Fee & Steve Purcell | September 8, 2022 |
As a storm pours in, Lightning and Mater arrive at a spooky hotel, where they are greeted by a creepy clerk. Mater expresses fear of the hotel, but Lightning assures him to not be scared. That night, while Mater is asleep, Lightning explores the hotel, is haunted by several ghosts, and returns to his room by morning, terrified. As the duo leave the hotel, the clerk, revealed to be a ghost, then taunts the camera.
| 3 | "Salt Fever" | Brian Fee | Steve Purcell, Marty Isenberg | Brian Fee, Bobby Podesta & J. Garret Sheldew | September 8, 2022 |
Lightning and Mater reach salt flats and come across land speed racers. A duo of mechanics take Mater and adds boosters to him. Mater proceeds to race, going further as he progresses to Lightning's concern. Suddenly, the boosters fall apart and Mater is launched into the air. He experiences an out-of-chassis experience, meeting the soul of the Speed Demon, a car-ified version of the Grim Reaper. Mater returns to his body and uses his hook to prevent him from crashing. Both Lightning and Mater are bombarded by other cars piqued by the records the latter set, and flee the area.
| 4 | "The Legend" | Brian Fee | Steve Purcell | Melony Cisinski & Lane Lueras, Brian Fee | September 8, 2022 |
While camping on a mountain, Mater meets a group of investigators searching for "Bigfoot" due to supposed sightings in the mountain. After Mater agrees on behalf of both himself and Lightning to join them, the duo accompanies the group on their search. Lightning is carnapped by the purported "Bigfoot", whom he discovers is actually Ivy, a monster truck who ran away to the mountains due to feeling uncomfortable smashing cars as a performance. Mater finds them at Ivy's shack, and the two agree to scare off the investigators by pretending to be aliens. The next morning, Ivy joins the duo on their road trip. In a post-credits scene, Mater dances on the road while Lightning cheers him on.
| 5 | "Show Time" | Bobby Podesta | Steve Purcell & Marty Isenberg | Melony Cisinski & Bobby Podesta | September 8, 2022 |
Lightning, Mater, and Ivy visit a car wash, where the latter two get cleaned. Later on, they see a traveling circus, which Lightning is hesitant to enter due to his fear of clowns. The three watch a show, and then Ivy is picked to perform a show where she crushes cars, similar to her previous shows. Instead of crushing the cars below, Ivy dances over them, amazing the others with her talent. Ivy is invited to stay at the circus as Lightning and Mater, leaving the circus, bid her goodbye. In a post-credits scene, a worker at the car wash listens to a song on the radio and bops to it.
| 6 | "Trucks" | Bobby Podesta | Steve Purcell | Bobby Podesta & Lane Lueras, Brandon Moon | September 8, 2022 |
On the road, Mater expresses doubt whether he is a truck or not, as Lightning encourages him that he is one. The two come across a truck-filled rest stop. While Lightning looks around the store, all the trucks bring Mater into a musical number where they sing about their pride of being trucks. Once finished, a more confident Mater leaves with Lightning, who is unaware of the performance. In a post-credits scene, Lightning has the song stuck in his head, to Mater's shock.
| 7 | "B-Movie" | Brian Fee | Steve Purcell & Marty Isenberg | Brian Fee | September 8, 2022 |
While driving through a city, Lightning and Mater observe the filming of a zombie sci-fi film. The crew notice Lightning and decide to cast him as a deputy, although the filming goes awry due to his bad acting. Meanwhile, Mater impresses the crew and is given multiple roles, to Lightning's jealousy. Mater later explains to Lightning that he is good at everything and that he has got to leave a few leftovers for the others to do, which comforts him. The next day, the duo find out that the entire story was rewritten to be a musical instead, and Ivy has been cast as a leading role. Lightning and Mater, fired from the film, drive away.
| 8 | "Road Rumblers" | Steve Purcell | Steve Purcell | Bobby Podesta, Steve Purcell, Lane Lueras & J. Garret Sheldew | September 8, 2022 |
While on the road, Lightning and Mater argue, come across a camp, and get captured by cars with spikes attached. The two are forced to compete in the Thundercone, a deadly battle royal where one has to successfully kill the other, while avoiding traps set around the upside-down cone arena that competitors fight on. The competition, however, is interrupted by the arrival of cars with electricity and solar power. One of the cars, Jeremy, explains that both sides used to be one camping group before conflicts emerged and factions were built. Lightning and Mater attempt to dissolve the fight by giving a speech, but it fails and the two flee, with Jeremy following. At a rest stop, they later see that both groups of cars have made peace.
| 9 | "Gettin' Hitched" | Bobby Podesta | Bobby Podesta and Marty Isenberg, Steve Purcell | Bobby Podesta | September 8, 2022 |
Lightning and Mater finally arrive at Mato's wedding at Mater's childhood home, where Lightning discovers that Mater comes from a wealthy family and that Mato's fiancé is Mateo, the cousin of his protégée and student, Cruz Ramirez. Lightning confesses to Cruz that he's been uncomfortable with the trip due to his experiences. Meanwhile, Mater and Mato reunite, re-sparking their sibling rivalry until Cruz helps them reconcile. At the wedding, Mater makes a speech that allows Lightning to come to terms with his experiences, and he suggests returning to Radiator Springs by road instead of plane as he planned. In a post-credits scene, Lightning wonders where Mato and Mateo went for their honeymoon, before the couple are shown at a tire maze, which Lightning and Mater had visited previously.

== Production ==
=== Development ===
On December 10, 2020, Pixar announced on Disney Investors Day that an animated series starring Lightning McQueen and Mater traveling the country while meeting friends, new and old, was in development and that it would be released on Disney+ in the fall of 2022. It also announced that the series is written by Steve Purcell (additional screenplay materialist of Cars) and produced by Marc Sondheimer (producer of Miss Fritter's Racing Skoool), with Purcell, Bobby Podesta (supervising animator of Cars 3) and previous Cars franchise director Brian Fee directing episodes for the series. According to Sondheimer, the directors worked together to maintain continuity within the series. On November 12, 2021, it was announced that the series would be titled Cars on the Road. Production for the series took place over 15 months. According to Purcell, a few concepts for episodes were unused, though he hoped to use them in a potential second season.

=== Writing ===
The filmmakers wanted a short-form series because they felt it was the best way to explore the concept of a road trip, while also exploring the relationship between Lightning and Mater, as the producers felt the characters lacked screentime together. Each episode features a different tone and genre. The concept for the series was suggested by Purcell as the producers brainstormed ideas, having been inspired by a childhood road trip he took with his family; he wanted to explore how Lightning and Mater react to finding themselves in different scenarios. Purcell also sought for each episode to have "a totally new sensibility" for which McQueen and Mater would react to. According to Purcell, the story for each episode was decided out of a basic scenario, after which the filmmakers pitched concepts that fit within the Cars world and had not been explored before. Concepts for the episodes include stories inspired by films such as Mad Max and The Shining. For Mater's relationship with his sister, Mato, Podesta drew inspiration from his relationship with his sisters. The writers were also deliberatedly vague on Mato's personality beyond her relationship with Mater until the final episode in order to create audience expectation.

=== Casting ===
On November 12, 2021, it was announced that Owen Wilson and Larry the Cable Guy would reprise their respective roles as Lightning McQueen and Mater. According to director Brian Fee, Larry and Wilson were allowed to provide suggestions while recording their lines.

=== Animation ===
According to Podesta, the series was animated under a shorter time frame than usual, with each episode taking 5 weeks to animate. One of the episodes features a flashback sequence to the prehistoric era. For the flashback, animators were inspired by the work of stop-motion animator Ray Harryhausen, whose films Purcell watched in his childhood. For both the dinosaurs' movement and when Lightning and Mater's prehistoric counterparts are picked by the dinosaurs, animators deactivated the motion blur, which they did use for the rest of the sequence, to reflect the feeling of Harryhausen's films. The production designer also altered the lighting to further evoke his films. Other elements such as frames were also altered.

=== Music ===
Following the trailer's release, it was revealed Jake Monaco composed the score for all nine episodes. Monaco also co-wrote the series' title theme song alongside director Bobby Podesta, with Bobby Hamrick performing the song. Each episode features a variation of the theme song to reflecting its style. The soundtrack, featuring Monaco's score and four songs, including two versions of the theme, was released on September 5, 2022.

Cars on the Road

Soundtrack album by Jake Monaco
- Released: September 5, 2022
- Genre: Soundtrack
- Length: 53:52
- Label: Walt Disney
- Producer: Jake Monaco

All tracks are written by Jake Monaco, except where noted.

| No. | Title | Writer(s) | Artist(s) | Length |
|---|---|---|---|---|
| 1. | "Cars on the Road" (Main Title) | Bobby Podesta | Bobby Hamrick | 0:20 |
| 2. | "Doo Wop in the Bucket" | | | 1:54 |
| 3. | "Dino Park" | | | 1:32 |
| 4. | "Matersaur" | | | 1:45 |
| 5. | "Cars in the Carboniferous" | | | 0:48 |
| 6. | "Lights Out" | | | 1:57 |
| 7. | "Wraith Wrock" | | | 1:15 |
| 8. | "Cars Haunt the Road" | | | 0:49 |
| 9. | "Salt Fever" | | | 1:43 |
| 10. | "Speed Daemon" | | | 1:18 |
| 11. | "Cars on the Flats" | | | 0:46 |
| 12. | "Wayne County Cryptid Busters" | | | 1:20 |
| 13. | "The Legend" | | | 2:04 |
| 14. | "A Reeeeal Scary Story" | | | 1:45 |
| 15. | "Cars on the Fringe(s of Our Perception)" | | | 1:24 |
| 16. | "Whale Washing" | | | 0:58 |
| 17. | "Show Time" | | | 2:07 |
| 18. | "Circus Velocitas" | | | 1:27 |
| 19. | "Tip Tap Boom" | | | 1:04 |
| 20. | "New Beginnings" | | | 1:19 |
| 21. | "Cars in the Show" | | | 0:48 |
| 22. | "Truckey's" | | | 1:08 |
| 23. | "TRUCKS" | Jake Monaco; Podesta; Steve Purcell | Cars on the Road – Cast | 3:00 |
| 24. | "Trucks on the Road" | | | 0:37 |
| 25. | "B-Movie" | | | 1:55 |
| 26. | "Brain on Wheels" | Monaco; Purcell | Quinta Brunson | 1:04 |
| 27. | "Cars on the Backlot" | | | 0:46 |
| 28. | "Road Rumblers" | | | 0:58 |
| 29. | "Oil Cans Harry" | | | 3:40 |
| 30. | "Brave Cars" | | | 1:00 |
| 31. | "Charge on the Road" | | | 0:39 |
| 32. | "Gettin' Hitched" | | | 1:43 |
| 33. | "Pomp & Odd Circumstances" | | | 1:10 |
| 34. | "Tow-Mater, Tow-Mato" | | | 1:51 |
| 35. | "Mater's Speech" | | | 1:17 |
| 36. | "Road Back Home" | | | 1:29 |
| 37. | "Cars on the Road" | Podesta; Monaco | Hamrick | 2:54 |
| Total length: | | | | 53:52 |

== Release ==
Cars on the Road premiered on September 8, 2022, on Disney+, part of Disney+ Day and consists of nine episodes.

Additionally, all episodes were uploaded to the Disney Junior YouTube channel from September 5, 2023, to December 24, 2023. Disney Junior also added a compilation of the entire show on January 7, 2024. Internationally, Disney Jr. Latinoamérica, Disney Junior España and Disney Junior Deutschland uploaded the episodes of the show to their YouTube channels beginning in fall 2023. Finally, Cars on the Road debuted on the German Disney Channel on November 19, 2023.

The series premiered on TV with the episode "Gettin' Hitched" on Disney Jr. on June 7, 2025, after the popularity the series got after posting full episodes on YouTube. The series also aired on Disney Channel on June 8, 2025, and went off its broadcast on June 29, 2025. The series also aired on Disney XD.

=== Marketing ===
The official trailer was released by Pixar's YouTube channel on August 1, 2022. To promote the series' release, McDonald's launched its promotional campaign by including one of eight toys free with the purchase of a Happy Meal.

== Reception ==
=== Critical reception ===
On the review aggregator website Rotten Tomatoes, the series holds a 93% approval rating, with an average rating of 7.00/10 based on 14 reviews.

Joel Keller of Decider found the series to be a classic buddy road trip, praising the humor and the way the show parodies pop culture, while applauding the performances of the voice actors, citing the dynamic between Owen Wilson and Larry the Cable Guy. Polly Conway of Common Sense Media rated the series 4 out of 5 stars, praised the depiction of positive messages and role models, citing friendship and discovery, while finding the series entertaining across its humor and family-friendly. Randy Myers of The Mercury News gave the series 3 out of 4 stars, called the setup simple yet efficient and found the series joyful and entertaining, stating it succeeds to celebrate friendship across the characters, while acknowledging the references to pop culture.

=== Audience viewership ===
According to Flix Patrol, Cars on the Road was the 7th most watched streaming series on Disney+ in the week of its release, as well as the 3rd and 9th most watched during its second and third week respectively. On Disney Junior's YouTube channel, all episodes have amassed about 85 million views with the most popular episodes being Trucks (32M), Salt Fever (18M) and B-Movie (8,7).

Internationally, Disney Jr. Latinoamérica records 35 million views on all episodes, Disney Junior España tracks about 20,6 millions on the episodes as well as 20 millions on the compilation and Disney Junior Deutschland about 18,4 millions on all episodes combined.

Additionally, the official music video for the song "Trucks" from the episode of the same name has received more than 94 million views on YouTube.

=== Accolades ===
Christopher Foreman, Elana Lederman, John Lockwood, Jae Jun Yi, Justin Ritter were nominated for the short "Road Rumblers" for the category Outstanding Achievement for Animated Effects in an Animated Television/Broadcast Production at the 50th Annie Awards. The series is nominated for Outstanding Editing for an Animated Program for Jason Brodkey and Serena Warner at the 2nd Children's and Family Emmy Awards. It is also nominated for Short Form Series with associate casting directors Natalie Lyon, Kevin Reher and Kate Hansen-Birnbaum at the 39th Artios Awards.
