= Lightning McQueen =

Fictional character from Cars franchise

- Cars character
- Lightning McQueen as he appears in Cars wearing his rookie paint job
- First appearance: Cars (2006)
- Created by: John Lasseter; Joe Ranft; Jorgen Klubien
- Voiced by: Owen Wilson (films, Cars: The Video Game, Mater and the Ghostlight, Cars Toons: Tales from Radiator Springs, Cars on the Road, and LEGO Pixar: BrickToons); Keith Ferguson (most video games, Cars Toons: Mater's Tall Tales, Cars Toons: Tales from Radiator Springs, and Miss Fritter's Racing Skoool); Ben Rausch (Cars 3: Driven to Win)

In-universe information
- Full name: Montgomery McQueen
- Species: Stock car
- Significant other: Sally Carrera
- Nationality: American

Montgomery "Monty" McQueen, more commonly called Lightning McQueen, is a fictional anthropomorphic stock car and the protagonist of the Disney/Pixar Cars franchise. He was developed by John Lasseter and co-director Joe Ranft from a story concept by Jorgen Klubien. Lightning's appearances include the feature films Cars, Cars 2, and Cars 3, as well as the animated series Cars Toons and Cars on the Road. He is also a playable character in each of the Cars video game installments. Primarily voiced by Owen Wilson, Lightning is recognizable by his red body with yellow and orange lightning bolt stickers featuring his racing number on his sides.

In Cars, Lightning begins as a talented but cocky rookie in the Piston Cup racing series who becomes stranded in the small town of Radiator Springs, where he learns about humility and friendship from the locals. Over his professional racing career, he achieves seven Piston Cup victories. In Cars 2, he competes in the World Grand Prix, while his friend Tow Mater is unwittingly dragged into a spy mission. In Cars 3, he struggles to come to terms with retirement and assumes the role of Cruz Ramirez's mentor.

Despite receiving a mixed reaction from critics in the first film, Lightning has become a recognizable face and mascot of the Cars franchise. He has been widely merchandised in the form of branded toy cars and other products. He has been mentioned in commentary by NASCAR racing drivers, including Kyle Busch and Chris Buescher, and his achievements have been discussed by sports journalist Stephen A. Smith. Critics have described him as one of the greatest or most iconic cars in film.

== Development ==
=== Concept and creation ===
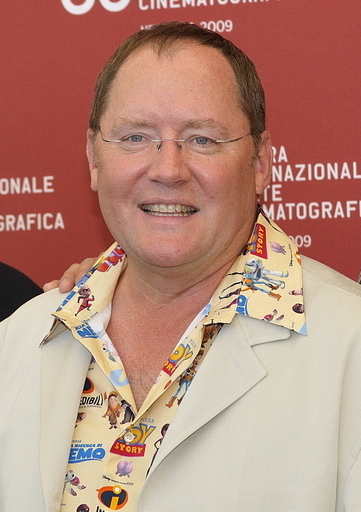
Cars director John Lasseter conceived the idea of using a racing car as the main character in the film.

The concept for Cars originated in 1998. Danish story development artist Jorgen Klubien had the idea to write an animated feature based on an unpopular three-wheeled electric car in Denmark. The car reminded him of The Ugly Duckling by Hans Christian Andersen, where a character is not initially accepted but later proves to be a success. He began to write the story concept with the title "The Yellow Car," set in a small town populated by cars rather than people. The story involved the titular yellow car struggling to be accepted by the local residents but eventually earning its place in the community. Pixar Chief Creative Officer John Lasseter liked the concept of a world inhabited by cars presented by Klubien, but felt it would need a stronger character to create conflict in the story. He and co-director Joe Ranft began developing the various car characters, and the Yellow Car was eventually replaced by Lightning.

From the start, Pixar's new film project was referred to as Cars. Lasseter decided the main character should be a racing car because it represents speed, power and individuality. The Pixar team focused their research on racing cars, with Lasseter attending numerous races to ensure the film was "authentic in every single detail." The team visited Lowe's Motor Speedway in Concord, North Carolina and met with Richard Petty. Story artist Steve Purcell said that meeting die-hard fans and experiencing the track firsthand was the ideal education needed for the film's development. Lasseter also took driving lessons at the Infineon Raceway from Jim Russell Racing School instructors, which became invaluable for giving direction to Owen Wilson, who voiced Lightning.

Lasseter, who had previously worked on Toy Story, had for many years toyed with the idea of making a film about cars, having a particular love of cars and NASCAR racing. Lasseter said he became hooked on cars at an early age after buying Hot Wheels. He cited childhood vacations with his family on Route 66 and the animated films of Japanese producer Hayao Miyazaki as his inspirations. In the summer of 2000, he and his family went on a two-month road trip where they avoided interstate highways, forcing them to take a slower journey. From this experience, he began to develop the story idea for the film. "I discovered that the journey in life is the reward," he recalled.

In 2001, he and a group of Pixar staff took a trip on Route 66. Over nine days, they toured a number of places along the route, including Route 66 Museum in Clinton, Oklahoma, and studied the landscape. Lasseter researched automotives, befriending design chief J Mays of the Ford Motor Company. During development, Porsche 911 coupes were delivered to Pixar offices for inspection by the animators. Lasseter and the production team met with General Motors designers in the early 2000s to discuss the new Chevrolet Corvette design. Cars also reflects Lasseter's sadness over the decline of small towns on Route 66, which he said "died overnight" following the construction of interstate highways after World War II.

=== Characterization ===
Pixar's animators found it challenging to inject personality into the characters due to their rigid forms. In early animation tests, the cars featured big smiles and had less rigid tops, but Lasseter decided this needed to be changed to reflect the rigidity of real cars. The animators spent much time working on the face to ensure the characters felt like they were alive, and the grille of the car was designed as its mouth. For the eyes, Lasseter took inspiration from the Disney short film Susie the Little Blue Coupe (1952), in which the character's windscreen panes are used for the eyes. This choice brought other challenges with showing expressiveness. In early tests, the team found the eyes to be too far from their mouths, so animators repositioned the eyelids to improve their expressions.

Although most of the car characters were inspired by real models, Lightning was given special treatment. Production designer Bob Pauley explained, "He's the new rookie, he's kinda sexy, he's fast, he's different." The team combined their favorite parts from different models, including GT40s and Chargers. Directing animator James Ford Murphy said Lightning posed a challenge from the start, as the team knew it would be difficult to create a character that was cocky but also likable. To solve this, Pauley compiled biographies of celebrities with cocky but likable personalities, including American boxer Muhammad Ali, American basketball player Charles Barkley, American football player Joe Namath and American musician Kid Rock. Pauley said the character of Lightning was solidified once they started writing him as an "Owen Wilson character." The movement of the cars was also a defining part of their personalities. The team wanted to bring beauty to Lightning's movement, so they took inspiration from surfers, snowboarders and athletes like American basketball player Michael Jordan. Murphy explained, "We wanted to have that same type of feeling, so that when they're talking about 'the rookie sensation,' you're seeing that he is really gifted."

Art department manager Jay Ward said the theme of the film is expressed in Lightning's character development. He said that, as a racing car, he is entirely self-centered and his goal at the start of the film is to reach the finish line, but by spending time in Radiator Springs, he learns that "life is about the journey, not the destination." He described the racing aspect as the bookends in his story arc, "The racing world he started in and the racing world he returns to, and he is a different character". Lightning is not named after actor and race driver Steve McQueen, but after Pixar animator Glenn McQueen who died in 2002. The 2017 book Cars Origins: Struck by Lightning, which depicts McQueen's backstory, states his birth name as Montgomery "Monty" McQueen.

Creating the story for the third film presented the creative team with challenges due to Lightning already being a champion racer. Cars 3 writer Mike Rich explained that everything had gone well for the character's career so far, but this was not the best way to begin a story. For inspiration, they considered how real sports celebrities had adjusted to getting older. Their research showed some handled the change well, but others refused to adapt.

In Cars 3, Lightning assumes the same role as Strip 'The King' Weathers, an aging character from the first film, because, like him, he is threatened by newcomer Jackson Storm. For Lightning, Storm represents the end of his beloved sport. After a devastating crash, Lightning finds the solution in the form of Cruz Ramirez, who helps him learn that he no longer has to train like a young man. Story supervisor Scott Morse said, "McQueen is maturing; he's evolving. McQueen's a character that kids grew up with. For kids in particular, to see somebody they're comfortable with going through an evolutionary change, it helps them understand how to do that." Cars 3 director Brian Fee also cited conversations with retiring racing driver Jeff Gordon, alongside his personal experiences of mentoring his daughters, as inspiration for the emotional core of Lightning feeling pride in helping someone else win rather than being preoccupied with his own achievements.

=== Voice ===
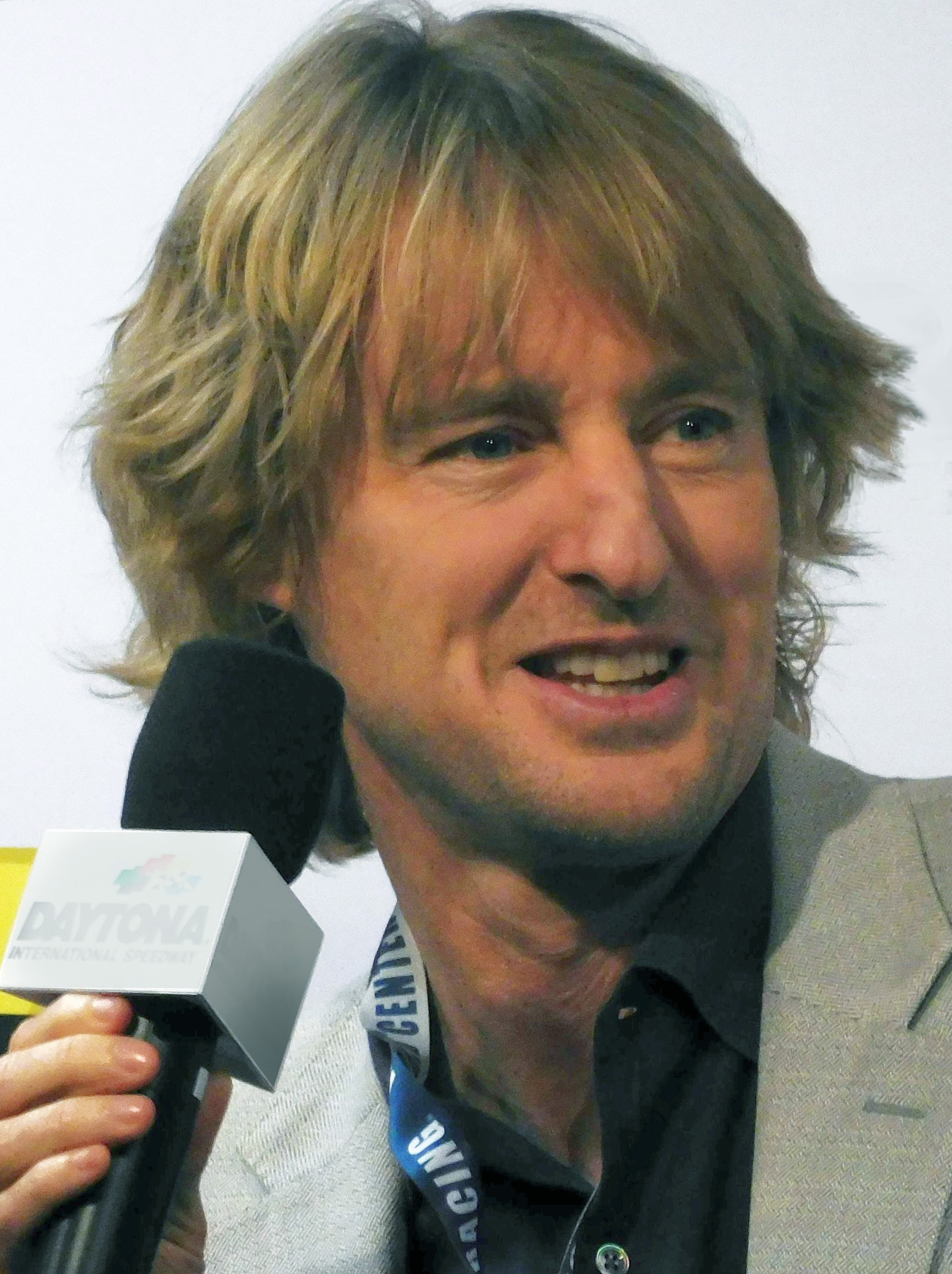
Owen Wilson, Lightning McQueen's primary voice actor, at the 2017 Daytona 500

American actor Owen Wilson voices Lightning in the original Cars film. He returned to voice the character in Cars 2, Cars 3 and the television series Cars on the Road. He also voices him in the short film Mater and the Ghostlight and the Cars Toons short "The Radiator Springs 500 ½" and the Cars and Cars 2 video games. Wilson said he was cast in the role as a result of Lasseter and his children enjoying Shanghai Noon (2000), a film starring Wilson and Jackie Chan. When Wilson met with Lasseter, he told him about the upcoming animated project and thought he would be suitable for the lead role. Wilson admitted he liked the "street cred" he got from his two sons for voicing the character.

=== Design ===
The Cars production team consulted a variety of experts, including racers, engineers and historians, to ensure the characters in the film had the appearance of real cars. Lightning is not based on a particular vehicle. Lasseter explained that the relative flatness of NASCAR cars, while beneficial for aerodynamics, made the design uninteresting for character design. Consequently, Lightning is a hybrid based on a stock car and a Le Mans endurance racer, which has a more curvaceous body. Lasseter added that the character also has "some Lola and some [Ford] GT40." His racing number was originally 57, a reference to Lasseter's birth year, but was changed to 95 to refer to the release year of Pixar's first film Toy Story.

In addition to his catchphrase "Ka-chow!", Lightning is recognizable by his red exterior, yellow lightning bolt and number 95 displayed on his sides. Throughout the three Cars films, he has a variety of appearances. In Cars, his cocky attitude is illustrated by having stickers for headlights. In Cars 2, he again appears in his red paint but with working headlights. Pixar updated Lightning's design for the sequel. Lasseter wanted him to stand out next to the other World Grand Prix contestants so flames were added to his body due to them being a common style feature of American hot rods. His bodywork took a year to design and involved many contributors, including Chip Foose. In Cars 3, his design varies, beginning the film with a new Rust-Eze logo. During his recovery after his near-fatal crash, he is presented in gray primer. In another sequence, he goes undercover at a demolition derby and is masked by a layer of brown mud. His red design is later updated with a vinyl wrap in preparation for the next racing season. By the end of Cars 3, he is redesigned with a dark blue paint job in homage to his mentor Doc Hudson.

For the Pixar team, these design changes are significant parts of his story arc. Fee explained that in Cars 3, Lightning "spends a lot of time in the movie trying to be somebody he's not." Lasseter said when he gets the vinyl wrap it is symbolic of him returning to his true self. Fee considered Doc Hudson and Lightning to be like father and son, thus Lightning is very emotional to discover that it meant such a lot to Doc to mentor him. For this reason, it is Cruz Ramirez who ends up with number 95, while Lightning displays "Fabulous Lightning McQueen" on his side in homage to Doc, the "Fabulous Hudson Hornet." Lasseter explained that his mentoring of Cruz makes Lightning realize he is in the same position as Doc when he mentored him, adding that the color change was temporary and just for fun: "...He's going to get (Cruz) going, but he'll continue racing."

== Appearances ==
=== Cars (2006) ===
Lightning is a rookie racecar in the Piston Cup series who secretly disdains his sponsor, Rust-eze. He hopes to be chosen by the more prestigious Dinoco team. Initially ungrateful, obnoxious, selfish, and sarcastic, Lightning believes he doesn't need a crew chief or much help from his pit crew to win. During the final race of the season, he blows his rear tires and finishes in a three-way tie with the soon-to-retire Strip 'The King' Weathers and perennial runner-up Chick Hicks. On the road to Los Angeles for a tie-breaker race, Lightning is separated from his transporter, a Mack truck named Mack, and ends up in Radiator Springs, a forgotten town along U.S. Route 66. He is soon arrested for accidentally destroying the town's main road and impounded there.

In Radiator Springs, Lightning meets a tow truck named Tow Mater, who takes a liking to him. The local judge Doc Hudson, Sally, and the other townsfolk vote to have Lightning repave the road he destroyed as community service. He rushes and fails to properly repave the road before reluctantly starting over. In the process, Lightning learns about the history of Radiator Springs and begins to relate to the town and its inhabitants. He becomes best friends with Mater, falls in love with Sally and becomes less focused on himself. He also learns a move called "turn right-to-go-left" from Doc, whom he learns is a retired racing legend, and how to drive backward from Mater, which he later uses in the tie-breaker race.

During the final lap of the race, Lightning witnesses Chick Hicks perform a PIT maneuver on The King, causing him to suffer a rollover crash. He forfeits the win to help The King finish the race and is praised for his sportsmanship, so much so that Dinoco race team owner Tex Dinoco offers to hire him to succeed Weathers. Lightning declines, choosing to stay with Rust-eze out of newfound loyalty and respect for them. Tex then offers to do him any favor whenever he needs it, which Lightning uses to get Mater a ride on the Dinoco helicopter. He establishes his racing headquarters in Radiator Springs, becomes Doc Hudson's pupil and reunites with Mater and Sally.

=== Cars 2 (2011) ===
Five years after the events of the first film, Lightning, now a four-time Piston Cup champion, returns to Radiator Springs to spend the off-season with his friends. His stay is interrupted when Mater inadvertently volunteers him to participate in the inaugural World Grand Prix. The race is sponsored by former oil tycoon Miles Axlerod, who hopes to promote his new biofuel, Allinol. Lightning is reluctant to bring Mater along, but agrees after being persuaded by Sally.

The night before the first race in Tokyo, Lightning and Mater explore the city together. Later at a pre-race party, Lightning is briefly embarrassed by Mater, who mistakes wasabi for pistachio ice cream. After losing the first race due to miscommunication surrounding Mater's secret involvement with spies Finn McMissile and Holley Shiftwell, Lightning angrily tells him he does not want his help. Lightning wins the second race in Porto Corsa, Italy. More cars suffer engine damage in the race, causing controversy and increased fears over Allinol's safety. In response, Axlerod decides to remove Allinol as a requirement for the final race in London. Lightning chooses to continue with Allinol because Fillmore assures him of the fuel's safety.

Before the London race, Lightning considers dropping out so he can look for Mater, but is persuaded by Axlerod to continue. After completing a few laps, Lightning spots Mater in the pits and tries to apologize for his outburst in Tokyo, but when he approaches him, Mater speeds away because of a bomb planted in his engine. Lightning catches up and realizes Mater was telling the truth about his involvement with a spy mission. Lightning apologizes to Mater and inspires him to confront Miles Axlerod, who is revealed to be the mastermind behind the plot to discredit alternative fuel so he can profit from oil. Mater forces him to disarm the bomb. Following the arrest of Axlerod, Lightning happily declares that Mater can come to all future races. Back in Radiator Springs, it is revealed that Sarge switched Lightning's Allinol supply with Fillmore's organic biofuel before the start of the World Grand Prix, thereby protecting him from danger during the race. A mini Grand Prix is held in the town, featuring all of the World Grand Prix contenders.

=== Cars 3 (2017) ===
Five years after the events of the second film, Lightning is a seven-time Piston Cup champion, veteran racer and racing legend. He competes in the series with his long-time racing veteran friends Cal Weathers and Bobby Swift. High-tech rookie racer Jackson Storm appears as the first of a next generation of racecars and begins to win race after race. Lightning pushes himself too hard while trying to compete with Storm in the season's final race and damages one of his tires, causing him to lose control and crash.

After being rebuilt, Lightning decides to continue racing. He heads to the Rust-eze Training Center and trains with Cruz Ramirez, a yellow high-performance coupe, during the off-season in the hope of increasing his top speed and beating Storm. Lightning's new sponsor Sterling, a successful business car, tells him he will have to retire if he loses his next race. Sterling plans to profit from Lightning's retirement merchandise. After several unsuccessful attempts at training, Lightning asks Mater for help, who gives him the idea to seek out Doc Hudson's old crew chief and mentor Smokey, a Hudson pick-up truck, and meets him at Thomasville.

After training with Smokey, Lightning runs the first half of the Florida 500 with Smokey as his crew chief before pulling out and giving Cruz her chance to become a racer with him as her crew chief. Cruz and Lightning share the victory due to Lightning starting the race, and the pair receive a sponsorship under a newly merged Dinoco–Rust-eze brand. Lightning decides to continue racing but spends the rest of the season as Cruz's mentor and crew chief.

=== Other appearances ===
Outside of the Cars, Lightning appears alongside Mater in the animated short films titled Mater and the Ghostlight (2006), Miss Fritter's Racing Skoool (2017) and Pixar Popcorn (2021). Lightning appeared in the animated series Cars Toons, which premiered on the Disney Channel on October 27, 2008. The first series of shorts titled Mater's Tall Tales centers around Mater reminiscing to Lightning about his past hero days. The shorts feature a recurring segment where Lightning claims Mater's story never happened, only for Mater to reply that Lightning was there too. This was followed in March 2013 with the release of Tales from Radiator Springs, a series of three shorts on the Disney Channel titled "Hiccups", "Bugged" and "Spinning." The shorts feature Keith Ferguson as the voice of Lightning. In 2014, another short titled "The Radiator Springs 500 ½" was released on Disney Movies Anywhere, in which Lightning is challenged to race by off-road racers. In this short, Wilson reprised his role as Lightning. An animated spin-off series titled Cars on the Road (2020) premiered on Disney+ on September 8, 2022. The plot involves Lightning (voiced by Wilson) and Mater setting off on a road trip to the east of Radiator Springs to meet Mater's sister.

Lightning also appears in video games. On June 6, 2006, a Cars video game based on the first Cars film was published by THQ titled Cars: The Video Game. It features 30 races and playable characters from the film. In 2011, a racing game titled Cars 2: The Video Game was released, featuring several playable characters from the film including Lightning. Warner Bros. Interactive released the racing game Cars 3: Driven to Win based on Cars 3 and developed by Avalanche Software on June 13, 2017. Alongside other major characters, Lightning is a playable character. In the third game he is voiced by Ben Rausch. The character also appears in numerous other Cars video games, including Cars: Radiator Springs Adventures (2006), Cars Mater-National Championship (2007) and Cars Race-O-Rama (2009). In November 2023, he was added as a DLC car in the vehicular soccer video game Rocket League (2015). On June, 2025, Lightning McQueen was included in the video game Disney Magic Kingdoms as a playable character to unlock for a limited time.

Lightning features as a character at Cars Land, a themed section of Disney California Adventure, which debuted on June 15, 2012, and features a ride named Radiator Springs Racers. On March 31, 2019, an interactive show named Lightning McQueen's Racing Academy debuted at Disney's Hollywood Studios, featuring Lightning as a physical vehicle. At Walt Disney Studios Park in Disneyland Paris, Lightning is one of the characters encountered by guests on a Cars themed tram ride named Cars Road Trip, which debuted in June 2021. In December 2015, a Pixar Cars Mechanical Institute exhibit launched at Petersen Automotive Museum, featuring interactive displays involving Lightning and other Cars characters. The exhibit included a full-sized replica of the character with displays about his components, such as his engine and suspension. Jay Ward, creative director of the Cars franchise said it was necessary to ensure that Lightning was not dissected to avoid upsetting children, noting he is "a living character who happens to be a car."

== Merchandise ==
Lightning has been widely merchandised as part of the Cars franchise. The character has been reproduced by Mattel as a die-cast toy car among hundreds of Cars toy vehicles since 2006. In 2011, Mattel released a Lightning McQueen Alive toy, a three-inch reproduction with a moving mouth, shoulders and a voice. To coincide with the release of Cars 3, Mattel released a series of toy cars and toy sets, including a 20-inch Lightning McQueen and a "Movie Moves" version featuring dialogue and light effects. In 2011, a Cars toy range called AppMATes was launched by Disney, which featured physical toy cars used with a companion iPad app to explore Radiator Springs. Lightning was included in 2013 in the first playset expansion of Disney Infinity. In 2017, Sphero released a remote-controlled animatronic Lightning McQueen, which featured a moving mouth and eyes and touch-sensitive surfaces.

== Reception ==
=== Critical response ===
Lightning's debut in Cars received a mixed response from critics. Lisa Schwarzbaum writing for Entertainment Weekly said his story arc, in which he learns that loyalty and community are more important than personal advancement, was nothing new and had already been done in numerous films including in Over the Hedge and Doc Hollywood. Paul Arendt of the BBC also noted the similarity to Doc Hollywood and expressed boredom over an "arrogant racing car" learning a lesson about community and teamwork. Nick Schager of Slant described his story arc as the "maturation of narcissistic stock car rookie" and thought his character development was a simplistic transition from "materialistic, self-involved jerk to noble role model." Philip French of The Guardian described Lightning as a "cocky, callow, young racing car, a flashy red affair" but noted the many positive lessons he learns over the course of the film. Mick LaSalle writing for the San Francisco Chronicle thought the film raises too many questions about the motivations of its protagonist, describing him as an "armless, legless, cumbersome creature, inhabiting a lonely landscape in which no real connection is possible." Conversely, Michael Agger of Slate praised the "heartwarming on-screen bondings" in the film, particularly scenes involving Lightning and Mater, and a dating sequence with Sally. The Washington Post's Stephen Hunter found similarities to Lightning in the boxing stories of the 1930s as a "champ who's really a chump" who learns lessons in humility and respect. He also likened him to American racing driver Jeff Gordon. Jeff Otto of IGN found Wilson's vocals "a bit irritating" and commented on the lack of chemistry between Wilson and Bonnie Hunt's Sally.

Film critic Roger Ebert noted that in Cars 2, Lightning is eclipsed by the supporting character Mater. Matt Fowler of IGN also commented on this, stating he is reduced to playing the "straight man", but thought giving Mater the main role in the film was a positive move because he felt Lightning is a "dry character." He also opined that Pixar had forced him into additional scenes just because he had been the main character in the first film. Empire's Ian Freer felt the relationship between Lightning and Mater is too simple and direct, particularly Lightning's expectations for his friend to change to fit into his lifestyle. Simon Reynolds of Digital Spy found their friendship to be lacking in warmth. A.O. Scott writing for The New York Times also criticized Lightning's racing exploits being upstaged by Pixar's "redneck Jar-Jar Binks." Peter Travers of Rolling Stone thought one of the film's strengths was Lightning's determination to prevent his career from breaking his friendship with Mater. Mick LaSalle of the San Francisco Chronicle praised the "recognizable earnestness" in Wilson's vocal performance.

Peter Bradshaw of The Guardian found the story concept of Cars 3 to be "a bit contrived" by presenting a story arc about a character that is still a champion but also struggling with the idea of being replaced by a younger generation. IGN's Eric Goldman applauded the depth in Lightning's character, stating that his story arc is "filled with allegory and metaphor" and praising the film for its detailed portrayal of what it means to be an aging athlete. Jeremiah Vanderhelm, writing for The Michigan Daily, commented that his story had already been done in other films like Rocky Balboa and Creed and felt the film should have spent more time developing Lightning's struggle instead of trying to focus on both him and Cruz. Simon Abrams of The Hollywood Reporter questioned whether children could really relate to a character who is being forced into retirement. Robbie Collin, writing for The Telegraph, described the film as a "profound victory lap" for Lightning, noting the emotional significance of losing his mentor Doc Hudson and the "touching contemplation of legacies" shared with Cruz. Julia Alexander of Polygon praised Cars 3 for bringing the franchise back to its roots, noting that the film focuses entirely on Lightning, who had been sidelined in Cars 2. She commented that the film makes it clear he is "the star of the universe" and felt that it is "the righteous conclusion longtime fans have been waiting for."

=== Court case ===
Disney and Pixar won a legal case on November 30, 2010, brought by stock car driver Mark Brill, who alleged the design of Lightning McQueen misappropriated his own car's design. The Oklahoma Court of Civil Appeals upheld the lower court judgment based on White v. Samsung Electronics America, Inc. The verdict was based on an analysis of whether the audience would mistake the car in the film for Brill's car. The court decided that "a fictional, talking, driver-less red race car with the number 95 on it cannot be construed as a likeness of a driver of a similarly colored/numbered race car."

=== Legacy ===
Lightning has been described by critics as one of the greatest or most iconic movie cars. (Note: Sources that cite Lightning as among the greatest or most iconic movie cars include:) In 2011, Liam Lacey, writing for The Globe and Mail, suggested Lightning should change his catchphrase to "ka-ching" due to the success of Cars merchandise, which earned almost $10 billion from the first film alone. In motorsport, the Japanese team APR Racing drove the Lightning-based livery No. 95 Toyota MR-S during the 2008 Super GT Series.

In April 2021, 15 years after the release of Cars, "Lightning McQueen Crocs" trended on Twitter, after the Crocs shoe company released a limited edition pair of adult Crocs designed in the character's likeness. In October 2021, Wilson appeared in a sketch on Saturday Night Live which involved him recording Lightning's dialogue for a fourth Cars film. In the script, the character is increasingly presented as the villain of the story. A debate over Lightning's status as the greatest of all time raged with fans on social media in November 2023, eventually involving American sports journalist Stephen A. Smith, who opined that he could not be regarded as such in comparison to Strip 'The King' Weathers. In February 2024, NASCAR racing driver Kyle Busch referred to the character after being in the middle car in a three-wide finish at Atlanta Motor Speedway. He commented, "I hate that we had a Lightning McQueen-style finish there," referring to a moment in Cars when the character finishes in a three-wide race by sticking his tongue out to reach the finish line. In May 2024, Chris Buescher made a similar joke after losing to Kyle Larson in a close photo finish at Kansas Speedway by commenting, "Guess I should've pulled a Lightning McQueen and stuck out my tongue." NHL rookie Roger McQueen picked the number 95 after his draft selection for the Anaheim Ducks. The character has served as an inspiration in real-world motorsport, notably influencing the current generation of Formula One drivers. Red Bull and Racing Bulls drivers Isack Hadjar and Liam Lawson have both cited Lightning as a primary reason for their initial interest in motorsport.
