= Tow Mater =

Cars franchise tow-truck character

- Cars character
- Mater as he appears in most Cars media
- First appearance: Cars (2006)
- Created by: John Lasseter; Joe Ranft; Jorgen Klubien
- Voiced by: Larry the Cable Guy; Adam Burton (Cars 3: Driven to Win)

In-universe information
- Species: Tow truck
- Gender: Male
- Occupation: Owner of Tow Mater Towing & Salvage
- Family: Mato (sister)
- Significant other: Holley Shiftwell (Cars 2)
- Home: Radiator Springs
- Nationality: American

Tow Mater is an anthropomorphic tow truck from the Disney/Pixar's Cars franchise. He features in the 3 feature films Cars, Cars 2, and Cars 3, as well as in the TV series Cars Toons and Cars on the Road. Mater is also a playable character in each of the Cars video game installments. He is voiced by Larry the Cable Guy.

In Cars, Tow Mater is the local tow truck who owns and operates his own towing and salvage yard in Radiator Springs and is the first vehicle in town to support Lightning McQueen. They quickly become best friends. In Cars 2, Mater heads overseas to act as Lightning's crew chief in the first ever World Grand Prix, but inadvertently becomes involved in international espionage after being mistaken as a spy. In Cars 3, Mater is a supporting character who stays behind in Radiator Springs while Lightning travels to the Rust-eze Racing Center, but gives advice to him on how to defeat Jackson Storm later in the film.

Critical reception of the character was mixed. Following his debut in Cars, Mater was described as the series' breakout character and made prominent appearances in Cars animated series and short films.

== Development ==
=== Concept and creation ===
Mater takes his name from construction superintendent and die-hard NASCAR fan Douglas "Mater" Keever, who was later invited by Pixar to provide the voice of one of the motorhome characters watching Lightning McQueen race at the beginning of the film. Cars director John Lasseter met him in 2001 while conducting research for the film at Lowe's Motor Speedway near Charlotte. Upon meeting Lasseter, Keever introduced himself by the nickname he had been given in childhood: "My name's Mater[...]Yeah, like tuh-mater, but without the tuh." This line was eventually used by the character in the film. Keever explained that the nickname originated in him throwing tomatoes around his family's farm. Lasseter was immediately interested in him as he felt that he was a definitive NASCAR fan. Although the cheerful truck character was originally intended to be a flatbed, Lasseter realised that the concept was not working and came up with the idea of a tow truck instead, using Keever's nickname as a pun to create "Tow-Mater".

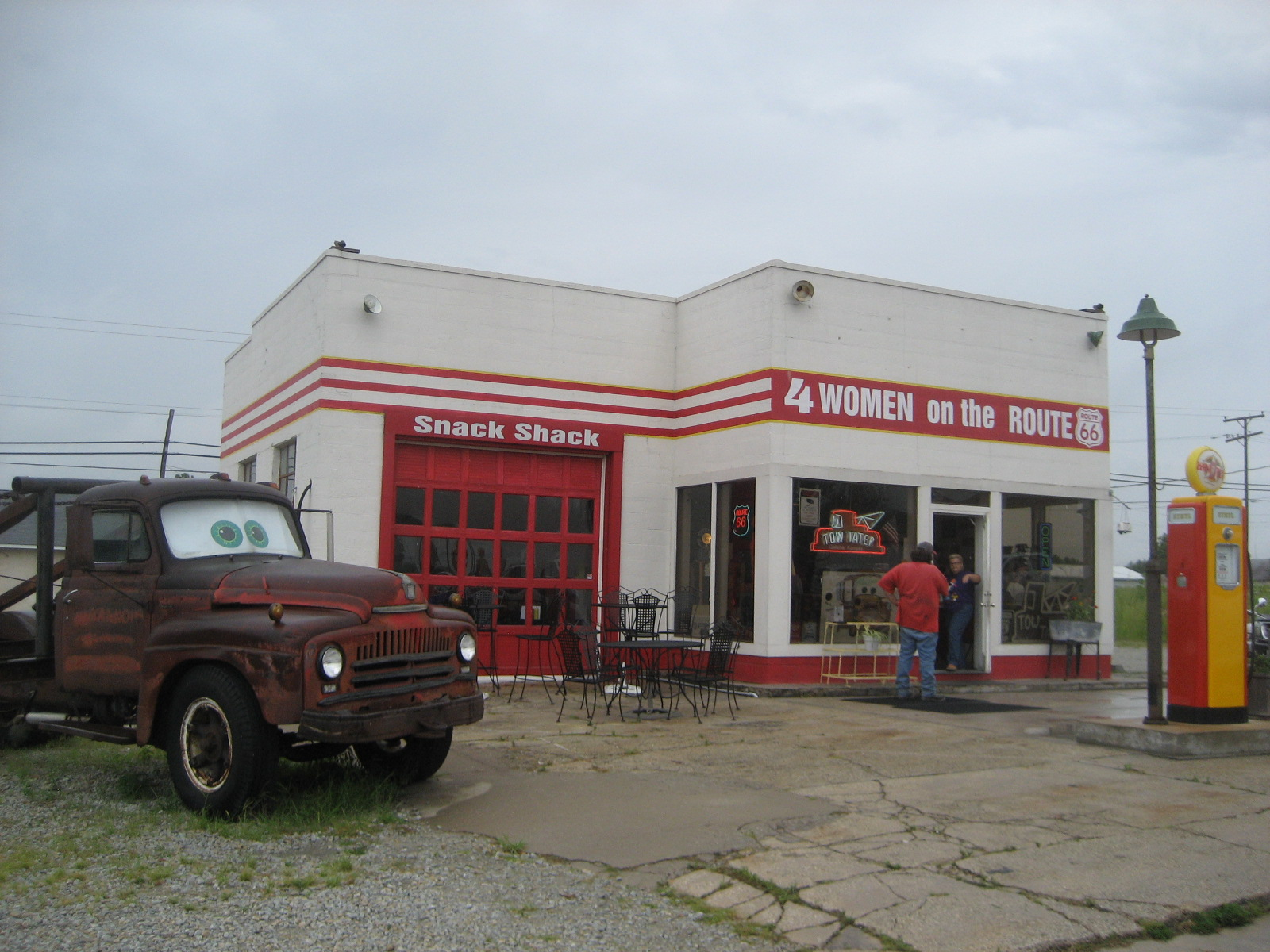
The former Kan-O-Tex Service Station and the 1951 International Harvester tow truck that inspired the design for Mater

Mater's driving skills include a claim to be "the world's best backwards driver," an ability inspired by Dean Walker, a Kansas Historic Route 66 Association president known in Riverton as "Crazy Legs Walker, the Ambassador of Crazy Feet on Route 66" for his ability to twist his feet backward and walk in reverse. The Pixar production team met Walker during a nine day tour of Route 66 guided by historian Michael Wallis in 2001 and decided to include his ability in the film. Wallis was keen for the production team to incorporate aspects of the people that they met on the trip into the car characters to make them more human. He also said that Mater's character was inspired partly by Harley Russell, who he described as "a troubadour in Erick, Okla., who wears a redneck tuxedo." According to Wallis, Mater's appearance was inspired by "a rusty old tow truck" that they came across in Galena, which he knew would end up in the film. Wallis recalled the moment that inspired Mater's design: "There was an old wrecker in an empty lot by Route 66 in Galena, Kan., ... Joe Ranft, the studio's head of story and a key member of the Pixar team, stopped and noticed it, and Mater was born." The inspiration for the character was a 1951 International Harvester tow truck that was used to pull equipment from the lead mines of Galena and, following the release of the film, was parked outside the former Kan-O-Tex Service Station as a tourist attraction. Due to copyright reasons, Disney requested that the truck be renamed, so the owners decided to call it "Tow Tater".

=== Voice ===
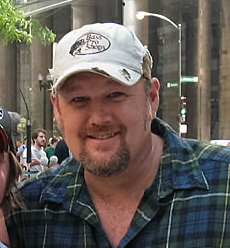
Larry the Cable Guy is the voice of Mater in the Cars filmography.

Tow Mater is voiced by American stand-up comedian Larry the Cable Guy. He said that he loved voicing the character because it was completely different to anything he had done previously. He is the voice of Mater in Cars, Cars 2 and Cars 3 and also voices the character in Mater and the Ghostlight, Cars Toons and the Cars video games. Lasseter entered into talks with Larry the Cable Guy after watching the Blue Collar Comedy Tour with co-director Joe Ranft and found his performance hilarious. Lasseter said, "His accent was so thick, but you could understand everything he was saying". He described him as the "funniest comedian you will ever see. Sweet and irreverent."

Recalling his first voice recording session for Mater, Larry the Cable Guy said that he was encouraged by Lasseter to voice the character in his own way after stating that he would not say the lines in the way they were written. According to his voice actor, Mater was originally going to be named Zeb. Larry the Cable Guy said that he was relieved that the Pixar team decided upon the name Mater because he thought it sounded cuter. He joked "'My name's Zeb, like web, only without the wa.' You know, it wouldn't have had the same ring to it". Pixar's senior vice president, Rick Dempsey, said that finding regional voice actors for international dubbings of the Cars films proved to be a challenge due to Mater being "kind of a redneck", which would have little meaning in other countries. For all 44 translations, the team had to work out which areas or dialects would depict "more of an uneducated population without being offensive".

=== Characterization ===
"For me, the tow truck is just kind of like me. It wasn't really hard to get into character for it. He's a nice guy, a lovable guy, and when he goes to all these different countries, he's in awe. That's like me. I haven't hardly left the States ever. That's how I did the character, how I would probably react in those situations."

— Larry the Cable Guy

Tow Mater is a rusty tow truck and the owner of Tow Mater Towing and Salvage in the small town of Radiator Springs. He is the loyal best friend of Lightning McQueen and deeply values their friendship. Mater is characterized by his cheerful and honest personality, but he also enjoys telling stories to his friends. Lasseter described Mater as "loveable" and "a sweetheart". He considered Larry the Cable Guy to be the embodiment of the character. For Cars 2, Lasseter wanted to give Mater more growth and focused the film on the character's friendship with Lightning McQueen. He explained that Mater's innocence is a core aspect of the story, illustrating this in the moment when Mater realises that the other car characters are not laughing with him but laughing at him.

== Appearances ==
=== Cars filmography ===
==== Cars (2006) ====
Tow Mater is a jolly, outgoing tow truck who lives in Radiator Springs, a near ghost town on historic U.S. Route 66. He owns a salvage yard called "Tow Mater Towing & Salvage", but after the town was bypassed by the interstate, has not seen any real work in years. After meeting Lightning McQueen in the impound for destroying the town's main road, he tries to befriend him. After a few days of being mostly ignored, Mater manages to talk Lightning into joining him for his favorite hobby "tractor tipping", which results in the pair narrowly escaping Frank, a large red combine harvester. On the drive home, Mater shows Lightning his special move, the ability to drive backwards with extreme precision, dubbing himself the "world's best backwards driver". Lightning is amazed by this ability and slowly begins to open up to Mater about his fast-paced life as a Piston Cup racecar. After Lightning agrees to let him go on a helicopter ride if he wins the race, Mater declares that he made a good choice in choosing Lightning as his best friend. Mater is later disappointed when Doc Hudson forces Lightning out of Radiator Springs. He is excited when Doc is revealed to be a former champion and brings Mater and the other residents to help Lightning in the tie-breaker race. During the race, Mater serves on Lightning's pit crew. Afterwards, he rides in the Dinoco helicopter that Lightning promised him above Radiator Springs.

==== Cars 2 (2011) ====
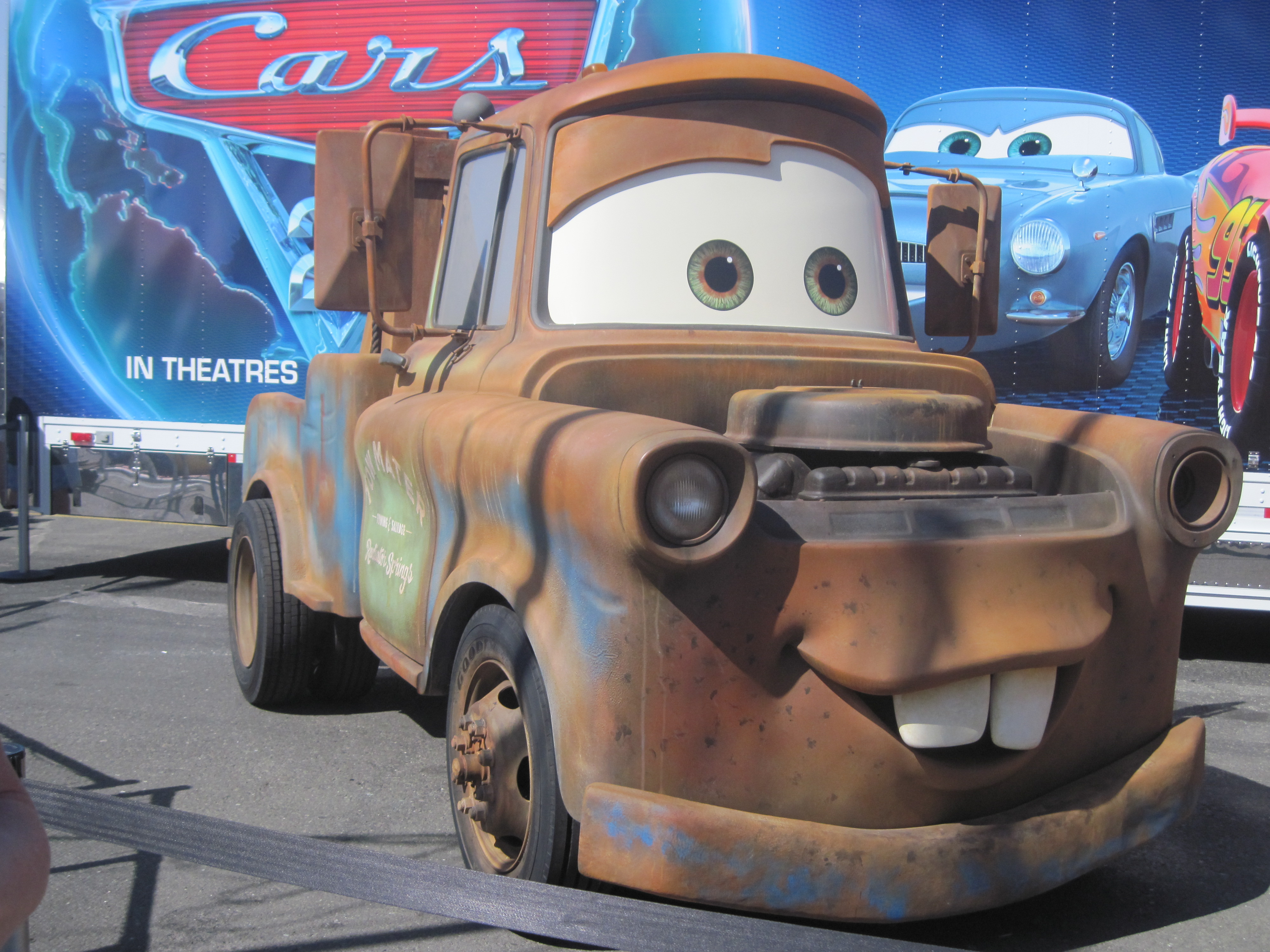
Mater replica on tour for Cars 2

When Lightning McQueen returns from a long Piston Cup season, Mater spends all day with him until Lightning leaves to meet Sally Carrera at the Wheel Well in Tailfin Pass. Mater sneaks in and acts as their waiter, but gets distracted by the announcement of the World Grand Prix on the Mel Dorado Show. When Francesco Bernoulli claims that he is a better racer than Lightning and starts insulting them both, Lightning decides to become a competitor. He invites Mater to join him as his crew chief and they head to Tokyo for the inaugural race. At the pre-race party, Mater is mistaken for an American spy by British Agent Holley Shiftwell after Rod Redline, the real American agent, is caught and plants his intel device on Mater. Mater is mesmerized by her beauty and falls for her immediately. During the first race, he meets Finn McMissile, but costs Lightning the win in the process, resulting in him lashing out at Mater. Feeling rejected, Mater decides to return home, only to be drawn back into the spy mission by Finn.

Finn invites Mater to join them in meeting an informant in Paris. From there, the trio head out to Porto Corsa, Italy, where Mater receives his first task to infiltrate a secret meeting being held by the Lemons in order to find out who is the mastermind sabotaging the racecars in the World Grand Prix. Mater learns that the Lemons intentionally made the alternative fuel Allinol defective to drive more profit into their oil business. When Lightning chooses to continue using Allinol during the final race in London, the Lemons decide to kill him. Mater immediately blows his cover, resulting in him, Finn and Holley being tied up and waiting to be crushed by the large gears inside Big Bentley.

After escaping Big Bentley, Finn and Holley go after Professor Zündapp while Mater rushes to Lightning's pit stall in the midst of the race to warn everyone about a bomb. He learns that the bomb is actually inside his air filter. Before doing anything, Lightning spots him and tries to apologize to Mater for his outburst in Tokyo, leading to a high-speed chase between the two ending in a final confrontation with the Lemons. Mater quickly realizes that Miles Axlerod is the mastermind behind the plot and is granted an honorary knighthood by the Queen. After returning home, Finn tells Mater that he has approval from the Queen to take part in more spy missions and Mater declines, but competes in the unofficial Radiator Springs Grand Prix with Lightning.

==== Cars 3 (2017) ====
Mater enthusiastically attends Lightning McQueen's Piston Cup races in his pit stall, going as far as wearing over-the-top novelty hats to encourage his best friend. When McQueen decides to continue racing after recovering from his accident, he heads to the Rust-eze Training Center to prepare for the Florida 500. Mater stays behind in Radiator Springs but asks McQueen to call him after arriving. Later, McQueen video calls Mater and they both have a heart-to-heart conversation. McQueen asks Mater for help after most of his attempts at training with Cruz Ramirez have failed. Mater helps McQueen remember Doc Hudson's mentor and crew chief Smokey and he decides to locate him and ask for his advice. During the Florida 500, Mater realizes Sterling's selfish intentions and buys McQueen some time by distracting him, allowing McQueen to get Cruz ready to replace him during the race. Mater later returns with everyone to Radiator Springs after the race and is there when McQueen reveals that he would continue racing but first spend the rest of the season as Cruz's crew chief. In the credits, Mater can be seen visiting the Rust-Eze Racing Center with McQueen and Lizzie as well as Thunder Hollow and Thomasville.

=== Short films ===
==== Mater and the Ghostlight (2006) ====
In Radiator Springs Mater's new hobby is pranking various residents at night. Sheriff admonishes Mater for "mocking the Ghostlight", an urban legend amongst the cars. After Mater reaches his salvage yard, he is frightened by a "lightning bug" (a tiny flying Volkswagen Beetle with bright headlights). As he relaxes, a bright blue glow suddenly appears behind him and, thinking it is the Ghostlight, goes into a blind panic, racing around Radiator Springs until he is exhausted. The Ghostlight turns out to be a glowing blue lantern placed on Mater's tow hook by McQueen and Guido as payback for the pranks Mater pulled on the other cars.

=== Animated series ===
==== Cars Toons: Mater's Tall Tales (2008–2012) ====
In Cars Toon: Mater's Tall Tales, Mater returns as the main character with Larry the Cable Guy reprising his role. Each tale begins with Mater telling a far-fetched story of his past. In the story, Mater finds himself in an inescapable predicament. When McQueen questions Mater over whether the events in the story actually occurred, Mater responds, "Don't you remember? You was there too!", and continues the story including McQueen's sudden participation. The short series end with Mater leaving the conversation, often followed by characters or references to the story that was being told, putting up a possibility that the story might have been real.

==== Cars on the Road (2022) ====
Mater reveals that he has an older sister called Mato and announces his decision to drive across the country to attend her wedding, but laments that he has not seen her in ages and is not looking forward to the trip. Lightning offers to go with him and make it a road trip; Mater happily agrees. During the trip, Lightning and Mater make stops at various events and landmarks across the country, including a dino park, a haunted hotel, a circus, and a movie production. When Mater and Lightning finally arrive at Mater's childhood house, they discover that Cruz Ramirez is also at the wedding and her cousin, Mateo, is the groom, meaning Mater and Ramirez will become family. Mater's sister Mato reveals their competitive rivalry and they initiate several competitions with one another, but work out their differences. At the wedding dinner, Mater gives an inspirational toast. Mater and Lightning decide to drive back to Radiator Springs rather than taking an airplane.

=== Video games ===
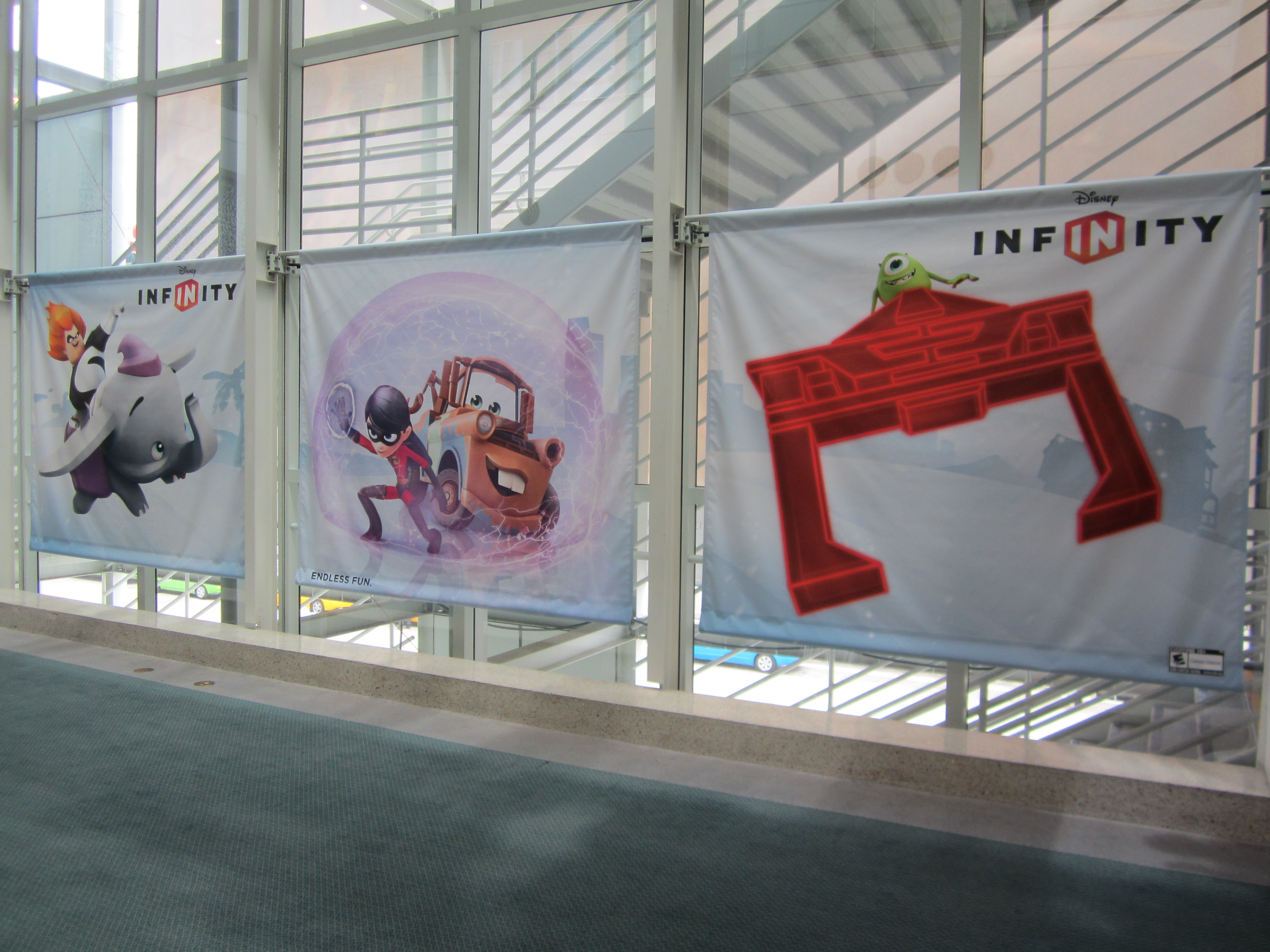
Mater with other Disney/Pixar characters advertising Disney Infinity

Mater appears in all Cars video games with Larry the Cable Guy reprising his role in all games, including Cars and Cars 2: The Video Game (with the exception of Cars 3: Driven to Win, where he is voiced by Adam Burton). In Cars, Mater is a playable character in Arcade Mode, "Tractor Tipping". Mater is also a playable character in both the Story and Arcade Mode of Cars Mater-National Championship. Cars Race-O-Rama was released in 2009 and provided another opportunity to race as Mater. Mater also makes an appearance in Disney Infinity, Disney Infinity 2.0, and Disney Infinity 3.0 as a playable character and a figure. Tow Mater was also included in the video game Disney Magic Kingdoms as a playable character to unlock for a limited time.

=== In popular culture ===
In 2006, Hollywood automotive body customizer Eddie Paul created Lightning, Sally, and Mater as real-life vehicles brought by Mack on a 41-city Cars promotional tour. Real life replicas of Mater and Lightning McQueen are shown at Disney California Adventure Park at Disneyland Resort in Anaheim, CA and Disney's Hollywood Studios and Epcot (as plants due to the sequel, Cars 2) of Walt Disney World in Lake Buena Vista, FL. In addition, unofficial replicas have been created by fans of the movie.

== Reception ==
Steve Daly of Entertainment Weekly described Mater as the breakout star of Cars, commenting that "he steals every scene he's part of". Michael Agger of Slate commented that although Mater comes across as a Southern stereotype, he is presented in a positive light. He praised Mater's drawl as a "lovely instrument, overflowing with character" and the sweetness of his friendship with Lightning McQueen. Empire's Olly Richards singled him out as the only character that the audience was likely to remember at the film's credits, describing the other characters as not particularly funny. Phil Patton of The New York Times described Mater as the "most lovable character" in the film. According to Matt Soergel of The Florida Times-Union, Mater was the best character in Cars. He praised both his "sweet, dim, exuberant" personality and "rusted, dented, buck-toothed" appearance as the character's standout features, while finding the other characters to be bland. Kristen Page-Kirby writing for The Washington Post likened Mater to the gravedigger in Hamlet, saying that he is well-written, entertaining, and serves the purpose of showing Lightning McQueen the real meaning of happiness, but added that, like the gravedigger, Mater was not written to be a main character.

Mater's prominent role in the plot of Cars 2 received an unfavourable review from A. O. Scott of The New York Times, who described him as Pixar's "redneck Jar-Jar Binks" and considered it a "calamitous" move. He disliked his "exaggerated drawl" and thought that Mater is "dumb, excitable and puppy-dog loyal, his idiot-savant automotive expertise grounded in humble, blue-collar simplicity". Aly Semigran writing for Entertainment Weekly reflected on this and also questioned why he had been given top billing in the film despite being the "second banana" to Lightning McQueen, but felt that he would not ultimately be detrimental to the franchise. In a Time review of the second film, Mary Pols expressed surprise to discover that Lightning McQueen had not yet rid himself of "needy, dopey Mater" and described the film as a "Materthon", commenting that the character left her "longing for WALL•E‘s robot to crush him into a silent cube". Todd Mccarthy of The Hollywood Reporter found Mater acceptable as a side character but quickly became tired of his "'Hee-Haw' routine" and "saddlesore witticisms". In his review of the film for The Guardian, Peter Bradshaw thought it was strange that Mater had been chosen to take the lead and commented that although he is cast as the star, he "doesn't have really anything funny or interesting to say or do". A. A. Dowd of The A.V. Club wrote that placing Mater in the film's leading role was "the biggest sin" of Cars 2. He likened Mater's espionage storyline to The Man Who Knew Too Little, with Bill Murray as Mater, and described him as a "fairly one-note character, built mostly for comic relief". By contrast, Matt Fowler writing for IGN thought it was the right decision to give Mater the lead role as he considered Lightning to be a "dry character".

Polygon writer Julia Alexander opined that with the release of Cars 3, Pixar attempted to ignore the events of Cars 2, making no reference to Mater's heroism and honorary knighthood in the second film due to its poor reception and instead focused the third film squarely on Lightning McQueen. Matt Singer of ScreenCrush also noticed that Mater did not play a prominent role in the third film and was for the most part sidelined by Cruz Ramirez in the role of sidekick.
