= Mater and the Ghostlight =

- Film poster
- Directed by: John Lasseter
- Story by: Joe Ranft; John Lasseter; Dan Scanlon
- Produced by: Mark Nielsen
- Starring: Larry the Cable Guy; Owen Wilson; Bonnie Hunt; Paul Newman; Michael Wallis; Cheech Marin; Paul Dooley
- Edited by: Torbin Xan Bullock
- Music by: Bruno Coon
- Production company: Pixar Animation Studios
- Distributed by: Walt Disney Home Entertainment
- Release date: November 7, 2006 (with Cars DVD)
- Running time: 7 minutes
- Country: United States
- Language: English

Mater and the Ghostlight is a 2006 American animated short film released as a special feature on the DVD of Pixar's film Cars, which was released in the United States and Canada on November 7, 2006. The short, set in the Cars world, tells a story of Mater being haunted by a mysterious blue light.

== Plot ==
Sometime after the events of Cars, Mater has been pranking the other residents of Radiator Springs by moving Red's flowers, bursting out from a pile of tires built to resemble the Colosseum to startle Guido and Luigi, dressing up as a cone vampire to scare Sally, unsuccefully attempting to scare Lizzie while she is sleeping, moving Fillmore's gas cans back outside while he takes them in and scaring Lightning McQueen when he believes Mater is hiding behind a pile of cans ready to jump out (what was really behind the pile of cans was one of Mater's signs). Afterwards, Mater teases Lightning as if he had seen "the Ghostlight," a Route 66 urban legend.

Sheriff admonishes him for mocking the urban legend. When asked about the Ghostlight, he describes it as a glowing blue paranormal orb that haunts Radiator Springs, though Mater insists it’s just a myth. Sheriff surprises them by claiming it’s real and relays a tale about a young couple who vanished after encountering it, leaving behind only two “out-of-state license plates,” and warning it despises clanking metal. Terrified, Mater starts making the very noise it hates and struggles to stop. Sheriff ends with a chilling reminder that the Ghostlight could be anywhere. The townsfolk say goodnight and shut off the store lights, leaving Mater alone in the dark. Nervously heading back to his junkyard, he spots a shadowy “monster” and, in a jolt of fear, shines his light on it—only to find it’s just a pile of junk with one of his signs. After breaking his headlight in panic, he retreats to his wall-less garage and shuts the door, which promptly falls off. A light suddenly appears in front of him and he panics, believing it to be the Ghostlight until he realizes it is just a lightning bug. Mater tells himself that the Ghostlight isn’t yellow, but blue. As soon as he says this, a blue light appears behind him. Using his mirror to take a look, he panics and takes off, convinced it’s the Ghostlight.

Chaos breaks out as Mater is chased by the Ghostlight, accidentally waking Frank and his tractors before speeding through Willy’s Butte, bellowing in slow motion, (reminiscent of Doc Hudson’s slide). The residents of Radiator Springs watch as he frantically races with the “Ghostlight” close behind, until he finally wears himself out and realizes it’s just a lantern attached to his towing cable by Lightning and Guido. The cars explain it was a prank to get back at him for all the tricks he’s played on them. Sheriff kindly reminds Mater that the only thing to fear on Route 66 is his imagination, while Doc jokingly warns about “the Screaming Banshee,” leaving Mater alone and spooked once more.

In a post-credits scene, Mater encounters with the real Screaming Banshee (A massive monster truck construction vehicle hybrid with a cracked windshield and a bold “BANSHEE” logo across its front.) Unaware he’s talking to the Banshee itself, Mater warns it about the fearsome beast before hurrying back to the safety of his junkyard, leaving the towering machine bewildered.

== Voice cast ==
- Larry the Cable Guy as Mater
- Owen Wilson as Lightning McQueen
- Bonnie Hunt as Sally Carrera
- Paul Newman as Doc Hudson
- Michael Wallis as Sheriff
- Cheech Marin as Ramone
- Paul Dooley as Sarge
- Steve Purcell as Tractors, Frank, and Screamin' Banshee (uncredited)

Non-speaking characters appearing in the film include Luigi, Guido, Flo, Fillmore, Lizzie, Mack, & Red.

== Release ==
Mater and the Ghostlight premiered on November 7, 2006, on the Cars DVD release as a special feature. On November 6, 2007, it got its first Blu-ray releases, once again attached as a special to Cars and as part of Pixar Short Films Collection, Volume 1.
