= Cars 2 =

2011 film by John Lasseter

- Theatrical release poster
- Directed by: John Lasseter
- Screenplay by: Ben Queen
- Story by: John Lasseter; Brad Lewis; Dan Fogelman
- Produced by: Denise Ream
- Starring: Owen Wilson; Larry the Cable Guy; Michael Caine; Emily Mortimer; John Turturro; Eddie Izzard
- Cinematography: Jeremy Lasky; Sharon Calahan
- Edited by: Stephen Schaffer
- Music by: Michael Giacchino
- Production company: Pixar Animation Studios
- Distributed by: Walt Disney Studios; Motion Pictures (Note: Distributed under the Walt Disney Pictures banner.)
- Release dates: June 18, 2011 (Hollywood); June 24, 2011 (United States)
- Running time: 106 minutes
- Country: United States
- Language: English
- Budget: $200 million
- Box office: $559.8 million

Cars 2 is a 2011 American animated spy comedy film directed by John Lasseter, and written by Ben Queen. Produced by Pixar Animation Studios for Walt Disney Pictures, it is the sequel to Cars (2006) and the second film in the Cars franchise. Owen Wilson, Larry the Cable Guy, Tony Shalhoub, Guido Quaroni, Bonnie Hunt, Paul Dooley, Cheech Marin, Jenifer Lewis, Michael Wallis, Katherine Helmond, and John Ratzenberger reprise their roles from the first film, with Michael Caine, Emily Mortimer, John Turturro and Eddie Izzard joining the voice cast. In the film, Mater (Cable Guy) unintentionally gets caught up in an espionage mission that risks both his and Lightning McQueen's (Wilson) lives during the World Grand Prix, an international racing event showcasing a new alternative fuel called Allinol.

A sequel to Cars was first announced in April 2008 with a tentative summer 2012 release date, which was later moved up to the summer of 2011. Lasseter was confirmed to be returning as director, while Lewis was designated as co-director in June 2010. The film's story was conceived by Lasseter while he was traveling around the world promoting the first film. Michael Giacchino composed the film's score, with artists such as Weezer, Robbie Williams, Brad Paisley and Bénabar contributing tracks for the film. This was the final Pixar film animated using its old software system, Marionette, before being officially replaced with Presto in 2012. With an estimated budget of $200 million, Cars 2 was one of the most expensive films ever made at the time of its release.

Cars 2 premiered at the El Capitan Theatre in Los Angeles on June 18, 2011, and was released in the United States on June 24, in Disney Digital 3D and IMAX 3D as well as traditional two-dimensional and IMAX formats. It received mixed reviews from critics, and grossed over $559 million worldwide, becoming the tenth-highest-grossing film of 2011 and the highest-grossing film of the Cars franchise. The film was nominated for Best Animated Feature Film at the 69th Golden Globe Awards, but lost to The Adventures of Tintin. A sequel, Cars 3, was released on June 16, 2017.

== Plot ==
British spy Finn McMissile infiltrates an oil rig in the Pacific Ocean owned by criminal lemon cars to rescue fellow spy Leland Turbo. He witnesses the lemons, seemingly led by Professor Zündapp, loading an emitter disguised as a television camera onto a shipping crate. Upon discovering Turbo's death, Finn is exposed and he escapes by faking his death.

After winning his fourth Piston Cup honoring his late mentor Doc Hudson, Lightning McQueen returns to Radiator Springs to spend the off-season with his friends. Italian formula race car Francesco Bernoulli challenges McQueen to participate in the World Grand Prix, an international three-race event created by former oil tycoon Sir Miles Axlerod, who intends to promote his new environmentally friendly fuel, Allinol. McQueen and his best friend Mater, along with Luigi, Guido, Fillmore, and Sarge, depart for Tokyo, where the first race takes place.

At a World Grand Prix promotional event, Mater makes a scene after eating wasabi and seemingly leaking oil on stage, embarrassing McQueen in front of Axlerod. Forced to head for a bathroom, Mater accidentally interrupts a fight between American spy Rod "Torque" Redline, who is tasked with handing Finn intel, and lemons Grem and Acer. Redline plants a device on Mater, causing Finn and his associate Holley Shiftwell to believe Mater is their contact. Meanwhile, Redline is captured and killed by Zündapp, who reveals that Allinol ignites when hit with an electromagnetic pulse. He informs his superior, an unknown mastermind, that Redline passed on his information. Holley recruits Mater to stop Zündapp's plot, believing him to be an undercover agent.

During the race, three racers are ignited by the camera. McQueen places second due to miscommunication with Mater, who was evading Zündapp's henchmen with Holley's instructions. McQueen confronts Mater at the pits, snapping at him and declaring he does not need or want his help. But McQueen regrets his outburst the next day after finding a note from Mater that he had decided to go back to Radiator Springs out of guilt. As Mater prepares to board a plane back home, he is taken by Finn, and they escape from the lemons in his jet, Siddeley. After traveling to Paris to gather intel from Finn's old friend Tomber, they go to Porto Corsa in Italy, where the second race takes place. Mater infiltrates the lemons' meeting as the camera ignites several more racers, causing a multi-car pile-up, while McQueen wins. Due to controversy over Allinol's safety, Axlerod lifts its requirement for use in the final race in London. When McQueen decides to continue using it, the lemons plan to kill him. This spooks Mater into blowing his cover, causing him, Finn, and Holley to be captured and tied up inside Big Bentley, where he admits to them that he is not the spy they think he is.

As the race starts, McQueen takes the lead before passing Big Bentley, but the camera inexplicably does not ignite him. The lemons tell Mater that they planted a time bomb in McQueen's pits as a backup plan, spurring him to escape. Finn and Holley soon follow, but they realize the lemons fitted the bomb on Mater's air filter instead. As Mater is informed of this, he flees down the track and McQueen pursues him to apologize for his outburst, while Finn apprehends Zündapp. The other lemons arrive and outnumber Finn, Holley, Mater, and McQueen, but they are rescued by the other Radiator Springs residents and Sarge's colleagues in the British Army. Mater and McQueen go to Buckingham Palace, where Mater exposes Axlerod as the mastermind, proven when he is forced to disable the bomb. It is revealed that the World Grand Prix was Axlerod's cover-up to turn the world against alternative fuels and profit from his ownership of the world's untouched oil reserves. Axlerod and the lemons are arrested, Mater receives an honorary knighthood from the Queen, and he and McQueen reconcile.

Back in Radiator Springs, as Mater tells everyone about his experience, Fillmore reveals that Sarge swapped McQueen's Allinol with Fillmore's biofuel prior to the London race, explaining the camera's ineffectiveness on McQueen. A "Radiator Springs Grand Prix" is held, featuring the World Grand Prix contenders. Finn and Holley invite Mater to go on another mission, but he declines. While his weapons are confiscated, Mater keeps the rockets and speeds off with McQueen and the other racers, as Siddeley flies into the distance.

== Voice cast ==
- Larry the Cable Guy as Tow Mater
- Owen Wilson as Lightning McQueen
- Michael Caine as Finn McMissile
- Emily Mortimer as Holley Shiftwell
- Eddie Izzard as Sir Miles Axlerod
- John Turturro as Francesco Bernoulli
- Thomas Kretschmann as Professor Zündapp
- Joe Mantegna as Grem
- Peter Jacobson as Acer
- Bruce Campbell as Rod "Torque" Redline
- Tony Shalhoub as Luigi
- Darrell Waltrip as Darrell Cartrip
- Guido Quaroni as Guido
- Brent Musburger as Brent Mustangburger
- Jason Isaacs as Siddeley and Leland Turbo
- David Hobbs as David Hobbscap. Jacques Villeneuve voices the character in the film's French dub.
- Stanley Townsend as Vladimir Trunkov, Ivan, and Victor Hugo
- Lloyd Sherr as Fillmore and Tony Trihull
- Paul Dooley as Sarge
- Michel Michelis as Tomber
- Sig Hansen as Crabby the Boat
- Franco Nero as Uncle Topolino. Nero reprises the role in the film's Italian dub.
- Vanessa Redgrave as Mama Topolino and the Queen of the United Kingdom.
  - In the film's Italian dub, Sophia Loren voices Mama Topolino, while Redgrave reprises the role of the Queen.
- Bonnie Hunt as Sally Carrera
- Cheech Marin as Ramone
- Jenifer Lewis as Flo
- Michael Wallis as Sheriff
- Katherine Helmond as Lizzie
- John Ratzenberger as Mack
- Jeff Garlin as Otis
- Patrick Walker as Mel Dorado
- Lewis Hamilton as himself
- Velibor Topic as Alexander Hugo
- John Mainier as J. Curby Gremlin
- Brad Lewis as Tubbs Pacer
- Richard Kind as Van
- Edie McClurg as Minny
- Teresa Gallagher as Mater's computer
- Jeff Gordon as Jeff Gorvette
- John Lasseter as John Lassetire

Three voice actors of the first Cars film had died since its release, leading to changes to their characters' roles in Cars 2. Joe Ranft, who voiced Red, died in an automobile accident in 2005, and therefore Red has no vocal role in Cars 2. George Carlin, who voiced Fillmore, died of heart failure in June 2008, so Fillmore was voiced by Lloyd Sherr (who also voices Tony Trihull). Paul Newman, who voiced Doc Hudson, died of cancer in September 2008. After Newman's death, Lasseter said they would "see how the story goes with Doc Hudson." Doc was eventually dropped, and was implied to have canonically died a few years before the events of Cars 2.

In international versions of the film, the character Jeff Gorvette is replaced with race car drivers known in their specific countries for his dialogue scenes: Mark Winterbottom as Frosty in the Australian release, Fernando Alonso in the Spanish release, Vitaly Petrov in the Russian release, Jan Nilsson as Flash in the Swedish release, Memo Rojas in the Latin American release, and Sebastian Vettel as Sebastian Schnell in the German release. Gorvette still appears as a competitor for most of the film. In Brazil, Gorvette is replaced by Carla Veloso in his dialogue scenes (Carla appears in all other versions of the film, but with no lines); Carla is voiced by Brazilian singer Claudia Leitte. Sportspeople still appear, with Lewis Hamilton voicing Formula One champion Emerson Fittipaldi, while Brent Mustangburger and David Hobbscap are voiced by sports announcers José Trajano and Luciano do Valle.

== Production ==
=== Development ===
Cars (2006) is the second Pixar film, after Toy Story (1995), to have a sequel as well as become a franchise. John Lasseter, the director of the film, explained that as with Toy Story 2 (1999) and Toy Story 3 (2010), Pixar would only commit to doing a sequel when they have come up with an idea that is different from but also as good as or better than the original film. Lasseter stated that "[...] the origins of Cars 2 came from three places": the idea of having a spy movie with cars as characters inspired by an abandoned sequence from the first film, the desire to take the original film's characters around the world in an international World Grand Prix, and the heart of the film which would address "[...] McQueen and Mater's friendship and how taking Mater out of Radiator Springs fractures their friendship […]". While traveling around the world promoting the first film, Lasseter imagined the characters in different countries. He said:

I kept looking out thinking, 'What would Mater do in this situation, you know?' I could imagine him driving around on the wrong side of the road in the UK, going around in big, giant traveling circles in Paris, on the autobahn in Germany, dealing with the motor scooters in Italy, trying to figure out road signs in Japan.

Pre-production began as early as 2006, the same year the first film was released, with production designer Harley Jessup tasked with designing the film's many planned sets. Brad Lewis, the producer of Ratatouille (2007), was chosen to be the director. Lewis was delegated with conducting the early research of the international countries and Formula One racing, while Lasseter would become more involved as the film entered production. Producer Denise Ream revealed that the first storyboard for the film, which was that of the film's opening sequence, originated from a deleted scene from the first film, storyboarded by the late Joe Ranft in 2001. Ream, who came on to the film in 2008, added that the film's official production length was three-and-a-half years, quicker than the standard five years that most Pixar films take. Pixar selected Ben Queen, co-creator and executive producer of the Fox television series Drive (2007), to write the film after discovering an original screenplay of his. Queen described the screenwriting process at Pixar as "very collaborative, very fun", and found Pixar's strategy of shifting genres on sequels to be "gutsy" and showed a real confidence in vision. In April 2008, Pixar unveiled its latest animation slate, with Cars 2 scheduled for a summer 2012 release. In September 2008, the film's release date was moved up to the summer of 2011. In 2009, Disney registered several domain names, hinting to audiences that the title and theme of the film would be in relation to a "World Grand Prix".

In February 2010, Blue Sky Disney reported that Lasseter had been spending less time at Disney and more time at Pixar to help solve story problems on Cars 2. In an interview the following month, Lasseter revealed that he was not directing any films at that time. However, by June 2010, it was announced that Lasseter had been designated as co-director and was ultimately revealed to have replaced Lewis as the film's official main director during that time, while Lewis became the co-director.

Lasseter, who had stayed busy directing the Cars Toons between the completion of Cars and his work on Cars 2, was excited to return to directing films and described working with a team that included many new artists as "[...] really a joy" after having focused most of his time in his chief creative officer role at Pixar and Disney since the first Cars. For the last year-and-a-half of the making of Cars 2, Lasseter spent nearly all of his time working on the film but occasionally checked in as executive producer on Toy Story 3 (2010), Tangled (2010), and Winnie the Pooh (2011). The various teams behind Cars 2 found creative solutions for accommodating Lasseter's busy schedule to allow him the time and resources to direct the film on a compressed schedule while also checking in as executive producer on the other films. One critical solution came from Lasseter's partner, Steve Jobs, with the release of the iPad. Supervising technical director Apurva Shah wrote a review tool app on the iPad for Lasseter that allowed him to complete reviews via recorded voice memos for all departments including lighting, animation, effects, set design, and layout when outside the office primarily during commutes to and from work. Lasseter still attended all story meetings in person. "One hour on the iPad equaled three hours in the studio," according to Lasseter, who added, "I kept in touch with everyone. I did reviews in the car."

=== Story ===
Lasseter expressed that Cars 2 was an extremely personal film for him, saying "[...] I set out to make a film that was really fun from beginning to end and really different from Cars in action and setting and characters. And yet it still had the emotion, which is the hallmark of a Pixar film." For the film's first research trip that included a Formula One race, the filmmaking team attended a party at the Milan Museum of Modern Art in Italy. Lasseter recounted feeling out of place at the party wearing jeans and a Hawaiian shirt while being surrounded by models and other high-profile attendants, saying he felt like Mater and would later incorporate this idea into the film. Lasseter took inspiration from the television series The Man from U.N.C.L.E. (1964–68) as well as The Bourne Identity (2002), The Bourne Supremacy (2004), and The Bourne Ultimatum (2007) for incorporating the spy genre into the world of Cars. He also cited Alfred Hitchcock's films The Man Who Knew Too Much (1956) and North by Northwest (1959) as inspiration for the main storyline as they both feature an innocent character who gets caught up in a conspiracy.

Originally, the World Grand Prix was going to feature five races, including a 24-hour Le Mans-style endurance race in Paris, France and a rally race in Black Forest, Germany in addition to the races in Tokyo, Japan, the fictional city of Porto Corsa, Italy and London, England that ended up in the final film. Lasseter said the race had gotten too big and the film too long, so they trimmed the event down to three races. The races in Black Forest and Paris were dropped completely, and the scene in Paris was restructured to instead have Mater, Finn and Holley stop by to consult with an informant. For Italy, Ream explained that the Pixar teams decided to create a fictional town instead of recreate an existing one due to Lasseter's love of many different real towns in Italy and the desire to create a brand new Italian city that people would want to visit.

Ream noted the challenge of finding the tone in a spy story for an audience that included families, saying, "That was a large part of what we ended up doing, trying to get the spy story correct and clear, so everyone could understand it. That was really tricky". Story supervisor Nathan Stanton commented that among the story's biggest challenges were the scope and the heart. The passing of Paul Newman's character from the first film, Doc Hudson, was one such challenge as the original intention was for the character to come back for the sequel. Pixar ultimately chose not to recast Doc Hudson and instead imply that he had died sometime before the events of Cars 2. The story team also considered Doc's passing as an emotional plot point similar to the loss of a father figure that McQueen and Mater would deal with, but the team ultimately felt that angle didn't work and simply focused on Mater and McQueen's friendship as the emotional core. Stanton added that the complexity of the story was difficult to convey, and there was not much heart in the project for a long time. The team continued to rework the story with each screening to find the right balance of showing McQueen and Mater's friendship, the World Grand Prix, and the conspiracy involving Miles Axlerod.

Cars 2 was the first film Lasseter directed without the involvement of his close friend and collaborator, Joe Ranft, co-director and co-writer of the first Cars who died in 2005. Ranft was a story supervisor on each of Lasseter's first four directorial efforts: Toy Story, A Bug's Life, Toy Story 2, and Cars. In addition, he provided minor voice roles in each of Pixar's first seven films which included Lasseter's films as well as Monsters, Inc., Finding Nemo, and The Incredibles. Despite his absence, Ranft continued to serve as inspiration for Lasseter during the making of the film and in crafting Mater's arc. On working in Ranft's absence, Lasseter commented:

"It was rough[...]Joe was such an important part of my life. You know, like my best friend. My right hand man, my true wingman[...]You know I thought of Joe all through this. Because, you know Joe is Mater. He's all over Cars 2".

=== Animation ===
Cars 2 had 118 unique sets, double that of most Pixar films up to that point apart from the 80 to 90 sets used for The Incredibles. The film called for many new techniques that the studio had not encountered before or to the level of this film. As such, Lasseter described the film as technologically ten times more complex than any previous Pixar film.

Sets supervisor John Halstead emphasized that the carification process necessary for this film was carefully handled so as to not be heavy-handed, saying "We try to add the car features in a way that sits quietly. If you're looking for it, you will notice it, but we don't want to detract from the characters." The driving system used on the first Cars was refined to allow the animators to have the cars perform sharper turns when racing. Because the film would feature different race tracks that were each unique to their respective countries, the layout artists and sets department collaborated to create appropriate blocking paths for the cars and then tackle the challenge of setting up interesting camera angle shots during the races. Each sequence typically took four to six weeks to complete. The international story called for the inclusion of numerous new kinds of cars and other vehicles. In creating the new vehicles, the automotive designers followed Lasseter's edict of "truth to materials". Upon studying the first film, the filmmakers greatly reduced the number of controls used on characters in the sequel after finding that a substantial amount of them were never used in the first film. The team developed new techniques for creating fully 3D cities using a software program called Procedural, Inc. and a new procedural approach for creating various types of vegetation. The team also implemented a new system developed by Jerry Tessendorf into their previous system that was used to create the water in Finding Nemo to now create more realistic water and ocean surfaces for the opening sequence. Additionally, the teams made low-level routine edits to the shader code used for Radiator Springs in the first film to make it compatible with the lighting in this film.

According to directing animator Victor Navone, roughly 50% of the film was animated in the span of ten weeks. Navone said that while the schedule was very challenging, the collaboration between all animators boosted morale and noted that Lasseter coming on to direct the film gave the show more focus and energy.

=== Casting ===
In November 2010, the film's synopsis was announced, revealing the espionage racing storyline, along with a first look image and official poster. The same month, Owen Wilson, Larry the Cable Guy, Michael Caine, Emily Mortimer, Jason Isaacs, Joe Mantegna, Peter Jacobson, Bonnie Hunt, Tony Shalhoub, Cheech Marin, and Thomas Kretschmann were confirmed as the voice talent featured in the film. From November 2010 until May 2011, Disney released information about the remaining voice cast, including Jenifer Lewis, Katherine Helmond, Michael Wallis, Darrell Waltrip, Franco Nero, Vanessa Redgrave, Bruce Campbell, Sig Hansen, Michel Michelis, Jeff Gordon, Lewis Hamilton, Brent Musburger, David Hobbs, John Turturro, and Eddie Izzard.

== Soundtrack ==
The soundtrack for the film was released on both CD and digital download on June 14, 2011. Cars 2 is the fourth Pixar film to be scored by Michael Giacchino, after The Incredibles, Ratatouille and Up. It was also the first and only Pixar film directed by John Lasseter not to be scored by Randy Newman, who scored the first and third films of the Cars franchise.

== Release ==
During the summer of 2008, John Lasseter announced that Cars 2 would be pushed forward and released in the summer of 2011, one year earlier than its original 2012 release date. The US release date was later confirmed to be June 24, 2011, with a UK release date set for July 22, 2011. The world premiere of the film took place at the El Capitan Theatre in Hollywood on June 18, 2011. Cars 2 was released in 4,115 theaters in the USA and Canada, setting a record-high for a G-rated film and for Pixar. The latter was surpassed by Brave (4,164 theaters). The film was presented in Disney Digital 3D and IMAX 3D, as well as traditional two-dimensional and IMAX formats.

=== Lawsuit ===
In March 2011, Jake Mandeville-Anthony, a U.K. screenwriter, sued Disney and Pixar alleging copyright infringement and breach of implied contract. In his complaint he alleged that Cars and Cars 2 are based in part on work that he had submitted in the early 1990s and he sought an injunction to stop the release of Cars 2 and requested actual or statutory damages. On May 13, 2011, Disney responded to the lawsuit, denying "each and every one of Plaintiff's legal claims concerning the purported copyright infringement and substantial similarity of the parties' respective works." On July 27, 2011, the lawsuit was dismissed by a district court judge who, in her ruling, wrote that the "Defendants have sufficiently shown that the Parties' respective works are not substantially similar in their protectable elements as a matter of law".

=== Short film ===
The film was preceded by a short film titled Hawaiian Vacation, directed by Gary Rydstrom and starring the characters of the Toy Story franchise.

=== Home media ===
The film was released by Walt Disney Studios Home Entertainment on DVD, Blu-ray, Blu-ray 3D, and digital download on November 1, 2011. This release was produced in four different physical packages: a 1-disc DVD, a 2-disc combo pack (DVD and Blu-ray), a 5-disc combo pack (DVD, Blu-ray, Blu-ray 3D, and Digital Copy), and an 11-disc three movie collector's set, which features Cars, Cars 2, and Cars Toons: Mater's Tall Tales. The film was also released as a Movie Download edition in both standard and high definition.

The Movie Download release includes four bonus features: Cars Toons "Air Mater", the Toy Story Toon "Hawaiian Vacation", "World Tour Interactive Feature", and "Bringing Cars 2 to the World". The 1-disc DVD and 2-disc Blu-ray/DVD combo pack releases include the shorts "Air Mater" and "Hawaiian Vacation", plus the Director John Lasseter Commentary. The 5-disc combo pack includes all of the same bonus features as the 1-disc DVD and 2-disc Blu-ray/DVD combo pack versions, in addition to "World Tour Interactive Feature" and "Sneak Peek: The Nuts and Bolts of Cars Land." The 11-disc three movie collection comes packaged with Cars (DVD, Blu-ray, and Digital Copy), Cars 2 (DVD, Blu-ray, Blu-ray 3D, and Digital Copy), and Mater's Tall Tales (DVD, Blu-ray, and Digital Copy).

Cars 2 sold a total of 1,983,374 DVD units during its opening week, generating $31.24 million and claiming first place. It also finished on the top spot on the Blu-ray chart during its first week, selling 1.76 million units and generating $44.57 million. Its Blu-ray share of home media was 47%, indicating an unexpectedly major shift of sales from DVD to Blu-ray. Blu-ray 3D contributed to this, accounting for 17% of total disc sales. On September 10, 2019, Cars 2 was released on 4K Ultra HD Blu-ray.

== Reception ==
=== Box office ===
Cars 2 grossed $191.5 million in the United States and Canada, and $370.7 million in other countries for a worldwide total of $562.1 million. Worldwide on its opening weekend it grossed $109 million, marking the largest opening weekend for a 2011 animated title. Overall, Cars 2 became the seventh-biggest Pixar film in worldwide box office among the fourteen released, and was the tenth-highest-grossing film of 2011.

Cars 2 made $25.7 million on its debut Friday (June 24, 2011), marking the second-largest opening day for a Pixar film, at the time, after Toy Story 3's $41.1 million. During this time, though, it was the third least-attended opening day for a Pixar film, only ahead of Up and Ratatouille. It also scored the sixth largest opening day for an animated feature. On its opening weekend as a whole, Cars 2 debuted at No.1 ahead of Green Lantern and Bad Teacher with $66.1 million, marking the largest opening weekend for a 2011 animated feature, the seventh largest opening for Pixar, the eighth largest among films released in June, and the fourth largest for a G-rated film. In its second weekend, however, the film was overtaken by Transformers: Dark of the Moon, dropping 60.3% and grossing $26.2 million.

Outside North America, it grossed $42.9 million during its first weekend from 3,129 theaters in 18 countries, topping the box office. It performed especially well in Russia where it grossed $9.42 million, marking the best opening weekend for a Disney or Pixar animated feature and surpassing the entire runs of Cars and Toy Story 3. In Mexico, it made $8.24 million during its first weekend, while in Brazil, it topped the box office with $5.19 million ($7.08 million with previews). It also premiered at No.1 with $5.16 million in Australia, where it debuted simultaneously with Kung Fu Panda 2 and out-grossed it. It is the highest-grossing film of 2011 in Lithuania ($477,117), Argentina ($12 million). It is the highest-grossing animated film of 2011 in Estonia ($442,707), Finland ($3.2 million), Norway ($5.8 million).

=== Critical response ===
On the review aggregator website Rotten Tomatoes, 40% of 216 critics' reviews are positive, with an average rating of 5.5/10. The website's consensus reads: "Cars 2 is as visually appealing as any other Pixar production, but all that dazzle can't disguise the rusty storytelling under the hood." It is the lowest-rated Pixar film on the site to date and the only one to earn a "rotten" certification. Another review aggregator, Metacritic, which assigns a weighted average score to reviews from mainstream critics, gave the film an average score of 57 out of 100, based on 38 critics, indicating "mixed or average" reviews and was currently Pixar's worst reviewed film on the site. Audiences polled by CinemaScore gave the film an average grade of "A−" on an A+ to F scale, tying with Lightyear (2022) and Onward (2020) for the worst grade for a Pixar film.

"The original Cars was not greeted with exceptional warmth," said The New York Times, "but the sequel generated Pixar's first truly negative response." Critics generally criticized the focus on Mater and felt the film lacked warmth and charm, while also feeling the film was made as an exercise in target marketing and was too violent to be given a G rating. Reviewing the film for The Wall Street Journal, Joe Morgenstern wrote, "This frenzied sequel seldom gets beyond mediocrity." Entertainment Weekly critic Owen Gleiberman said, "Cars 2 is a movie so stuffed with 'fun' that it went right off the rails. What on earth was the gifted director-mogul John Lasseter thinking – that he wanted kids to come out of this movie was [sic] more ADD?" Although Leonard Maltin on IndieWire claimed that he had "such high regard for Pixar and its creative team led by John Lasseter," he said he found the plot "confusing" and felt that Mater's voice was annoying, saying that he'd "rather listen to chalk on a blackboard than spend nearly two hours with Tow Mater."

Conversely, Peter Travers of Rolling Stone gave the film 3½ stars out of four, and said that "the sequel is a tire-burning burst of action and fun with a beating heart under its hood." He also praised its "fluid script" and called it a "winner". Roger Ebert was the most effusive of the more positive reviews, praising Lasseter's channeling of childhood playtime for the film's spirit and writing, "At a time when some 'grown-up' action films are relentlessly shallow and stupid, here is a movie with such complexity that even the cars sometimes have to pause and explain it to themselves." Justin Chang of Variety commented, "The rare sequel that not only improves on but retroactively justifies its predecessor."

A central vein of many negative reviews was the theory that the Walt Disney Company forced Cars 2 into production at Pixar in order to drive merchandising sales. Lasseter vehemently denied these claims, which he attributed to "people who don't know the facts, rushing to judge." Some theorized that the backlash was less about the film's quality itself but rather Pixar's broadened focus on sequels. The New York Times reported that although one negatively reviewed film would not be enough to scratch the studio, "the commentary did dent morale at the studio, which until then had enjoyed an unbroken and perhaps unprecedented run of critical acclaim."

=== Accolades ===
Cars 2 marks the first Pixar film not to be nominated for an Oscar. It is also the first Pixar film not nominated for Best Animated Feature since its introduction in 2001.

Accolades received by Cars 2
Award	Date of ceremony	Category	Recipient(s)	Result	Ref.
Alliance of Women Film Journalists Awards	January 10, 2012	Sequel or Remake That Shouldn't Have Been Made	Cars 2	Nominated	
Annie Awards	February 4, 2012	Best Animated Feature	Cars 2	Nominated	
Annie Awards	February 4, 2012	Outstanding Achievement for Animated Effects in an Animated Production	Eric Froemling	Nominated	
Annie Awards	February 4, 2012	Outstanding Achievement for Animated Effects in an Animated Production	Jon Reisch	Nominated	
Annie Awards	February 4, 2012	Outstanding Achievement for Character Design in a Feature Production	Jay Shuster	Nominated	
Annie Awards	February 4, 2012	Outstanding Achievement for Editorial in a Feature Production	Stephen Schaffer	Nominated	
Annie Awards	February 4, 2012	Outstanding Achievement for Storyboarding in a Feature Production	Scott Morse	Nominated	
Annie Awards	February 4, 2012	Outstanding Achievement for Production Design in an Animated Feature Production	Harley Jessup	Nominated	
Artios Awards	October 29, 2012	Animation	Kevin Reher and Natalie Lyon	Nominated	
British Academy Children's Awards	November 27, 2011	Kid's Vote — Film	Cars 2	Nominated	
Golden Globe Awards	January 15, 2012	Best Animated Feature Film	Cars 2	Nominated	
Golden Reel Awards	February 19, 2012	Outstanding Achievement in Sound Editing – Sound Effects, Foley, Dialogue and ADR for Animated Feature Film	Cars 2	Nominated	
Golden Trailer Awards	June 29, 2011	Best Animation/Family	"Spies Are Us" (MOCEAN)	Nominated	
Hollywood Post Alliance Awards	November 10, 2011	Outstanding Editing – Feature Film	Stephen Schaffer	Nominated	
Hollywood Post Alliance Awards	November 10, 2011	Outstanding Sound – Feature Film	Tom Myers, Michael Silvers, and Michael Semanick	Nominated	
Nickelodeon Kids' Choice Awards	March 31, 2012	Favorite Animated Movie	Cars 2	Nominated	
People's Choice Awards	January 11, 2012	Favorite Movie Animated Voice	Owen Wilson	Nominated	
Producers Guild of America Awards	January 21, 2012	Best Animated Motion Picture	Denise Ream	Nominated	
Saturn Awards	July 26, 2012	Best Animated Film	Cars 2	Nominated	
Visual Effects Society Awards	February 7, 2012	Outstanding Virtual Cinematography in an Animated Feature Motion Picture	Mahyar Abousaeedi, Jeremy Lasky, and Jonathan Pytko	Nominated	

== Video games ==
A video game based on the film was developed by Avalanche Software and published by Disney Interactive Studios for the PlayStation 3, Xbox 360, Wii, PC and Nintendo DS on June 21, 2011. The PlayStation 3 version of the game was reported to be compatible with stereoscopic 3D gameplay. A Nintendo 3DS version was released on November 1, 2011, and a PSP version was released on November 8, 2011.

An app based on the film was released on iTunes for a dollar on June 23, 2011. The Lite version was released for free that same day. The object of the game was to complete each race, unlock new levels, and get a high score. As of June 28, 2011, the app had hit No. 1 on the App Store. The game was retired on August 29, 2014. A V.Smile version was also released.

== Sequel and spin-offs ==
A sequel, titled Cars 3, was released on June 16, 2017. Directed by Brian Fee, the film focuses on Lightning McQueen, now a veteran racer, who after being overshadowed by a new wave of rookies, gets help from a younger car, Cruz Ramirez, to instruct him for the increasingly high-tech world and defeat new rival Jackson Storm.

An animated feature film spin-off titled Planes, produced by DisneyToon Studios, was released on August 9, 2013. A sequel to Planes, titled Planes: Fire & Rescue, was released on July 18, 2014.
