= Cars (video game) =

2006 video game

- Developers: Rainbow Studios (Note: Ported to Microsoft Windows by Beenox, and to Wii by Incinerator Studios); Helixe (Game Boy Advance, Nintendo DS); Locomotive Games (PlayStation Portable)
- Publisher: THQ
- Series: Cars
- Platforms: PlayStation 2; GameCube; Xbox; Microsoft Windows; Mac OS X; Game Boy Advance; Nintendo DS; PlayStation Portable; Xbox 360; Wii
- Release: June 6, 2006: PlayStation 2, GameCube, Xbox, Windows, Mac, Game Boy Advance, Nintendo DS, PlayStation Portable; NA: June 6, 2006; AU: June 8, 2006; JP: July 6, 2006 (DS); EU: July 14, 2006; Xbox 360; NA: October 23, 2006; EU: November 17, 2006; AU: November 23, 2006; Wii; NA: November 19, 2006; EU: December 8, 2006; AU: December 14, 2006
- Genres: Adventure, racing
- Modes: Single-player, multiplayer

Cars is a 2006 open world racing game published by THQ. The game is based on the 2006 film of the same name. It was released for the PlayStation 2, GameCube, Xbox, Microsoft Windows, Mac OS X, Game Boy Advance, Nintendo DS, and PlayStation Portable in June 2006, with versions for the Xbox 360 and Wii released later that year. The Wii version includes functionality geared towards its Wii Remote controller and was a launch game for the system. Taking place after the events of the film, the game follows Lightning McQueen as he participates in the new racing season with his goal set on finally winning the Piston Cup. While doing so, he races and trains with the local community of Radiator Springs.

The voice talent returns from the film, with the exception of Keith Ferguson, who replaced Owen Wilson as the voice of McQueen on the PlayStation Portable version. All versions of Cars received mixed reviews. The PlayStation 2 and Nintendo DS releases of the game each received a Platinum Sales Award by the Entertainment and Leisure Software Publishers Association (ELSPA).

== Gameplay ==
While Cars is primarily played from the perspective of series protagonist Lightning McQueen, some scenarios allow the players to take control of other characters such as Strip "The King" Weathers.

The console versions of the game are set in the fictional town of Radiator Springs, where it takes place after the movie. The game takes place in an open world in the vein of Need for Speed, Grand Theft Auto and Midnight Club. As the player progresses additional areas of the open world are unlocked. The player character begins in Radiator Springs, but later unlocks Ornament Valley and Tailfin Pass. Players primarily control Lightning McQueen, but on occasion control other characters in specific events or minigames. It features ten playable characters from the film, all voiced by the original voice talent. The player must compete in 19 road races, eight mini-games, and five Piston Cup races to help Lightning McQueen win his first Piston Cup championship.

Races vary in format and include checkpoint races, circuit courses in the open world, and Piston Cup races. Additionally each format adjusts characters based on the situation. Piston Cup races include only Piston Cup racers and feature 20 cars. Circuit and checkpoint races feature characters from the open-world story. Additionally checkpoint races feature monster truck versions of characters. Multiplayer is available for two players in split-screen mode, and each of the standard races are available.

The game also features a number of minigames and items for the player to collect. Amongst the minigames are tractor tipping with Mater, and a tire hunt challenge with Luigi. Other minigames appear as events during races, such as Luigi's pit stops during Piston Cup races. Three additional minigames, Mater's Countdown Clean-Up, Mater's Speedy Circuit, and Ghosting Mater are exclusive to the Xbox 360 and Nintendo Wii versions, which released over four months after the initial release. Collectables help to unlock characters, liveries and concept art.

The PlayStation Portable, Game Boy Advance, and Nintendo DS versions differ from the primary release. In the PSP version, the player must compete several challenges to allow Lightning McQueen to claim Radiator Springs back from the Delinquent Road Hazards gang hired and led by his selfish rival, Chick Hicks. These consist of 13 races, as well as five boss races. Six additional characters are playable on the PSP. The Nintendo DS version is played from a top-down perspective in races, and various other perspectives for minigames. It utilizes the handheld's touch controls. The Game Boy Advance version of the game is played from a fixed isometric perspective. While the camera keeps focus on the player character, it does not rotate with the character.

== Plot ==
The story mode of the game is seen primarily via protagonist Lightning McQueen's perspective. The story progresses based on him completing various events to trigger the next major event, but due to the open-world nature players can complete minor events in any order. During the story players also take control of other characters such as Mater, Sally, and Sheriff for specific events. Examples include tractor tipping, where the player controls Mater who must tip tractors at night while watching out for Frank, and Sheriff’s Hot Pursuit, where the player plays as Sheriff as he tries to catch speeders causing trouble in Radiator Springs.

The video game Cars is set shortly after the events of the first film. It begins with a playable dream sequence in which Lightning McQueen participates in a street race through Radiator Springs and the surrounding area. He is awakened by Sally, who informs him that Doc is waiting for him at Willy's Butte. Upon his arrival at the butte, Doc gives McQueen lessons on how to perform a powerslide. With his lessons complete, McQueen heads to Flo's V8 Cafe, where he meets four new racers; two from England and two from Mexico. These characters challenge McQueen to exhibition races throughout the story. With his first exhibition race completed McQueen participates in some tractor tipping with Mater before heading to his first Piston Cup race at Palm Mile Speedway, which he wins.

Upon returning to Radiator Springs he participates in off-road training with Sarge. Fillmore also provides McQueen with a new organic fuel, which provides him with the ability to boost for short periods. He participates in a few more exhibition races in town before traveling to and winning his second Piston Cup race, this time at Speedway of the South. McQueen returns to Radiator Springs that evening. He is met by Mater, who teaches him the how to drive backwards, a skill that allows him to fill his boost. Through a race challenge from Sheriff (which turns to be a rematch of their first encounter where McQueen would have to be put on the impound lot for a short while if he loses to Sheriff), he is introduced to nearby Ornament Valley, where he encounters three additional casual racers from Queens, New York. There he is also introduced to the Rustbucket Race-O-Rama, an arena event consisting of rusty vehicles. Mater is able to win the event, where he is able to also win a boost tank that he gives to Lightning as a gift. Lightning participates in multiple races in Ornament Valley as well before heading to his third Piston Cup seasonal race at Sun Valley International Raceway.

When McQueen returns from his third victory he encounters the Delinquent Road Hazards quartet, the tuner gang seen antagonizing Mack in the first film and prevent him from passing. The four tuners challenge McQueen to a race through an abandoned mine, which they lose. Later Sally goes on a drive to the Wheel Well Motel, and McQueen is subsequently introduced to the Tailfin Pass area. Here he takes place in additional races and minigames in order to train for his final few Piston Cup races. Additionally McQueen participates in a monster truck race after being temporarily modified into a monster truck himself. Lightning and Mack head to the penultimate Piston Cup race at Smasherville International Speedway, but during the trip the Delinquent Road Hazards harass Mack and steals several of McQueen's parts. They are apprehended and McQueen learns that they were hired by Chick Hicks, McQueen's rival and current Piston Cup Champion who won it previously by crashing The King though he was chased off and booed by the fans and media furious with him. McQueen wins his fourth Piston Cup race after confronting Hicks, who denies being involved.

McQueen challenges Hicks to a four-race competition, with one race in each open-world environment, and the final race being the Piston Cup finale at Los Angeles International Speedway. He is victorious in all four races, which also results in him being the new Piston Cup Champion. The season over, McQueen returns to Radiator Springs and places the trophy on the window ledge in Doc's garage, where it shares space with Doc's trophies.

== Development and marketing ==
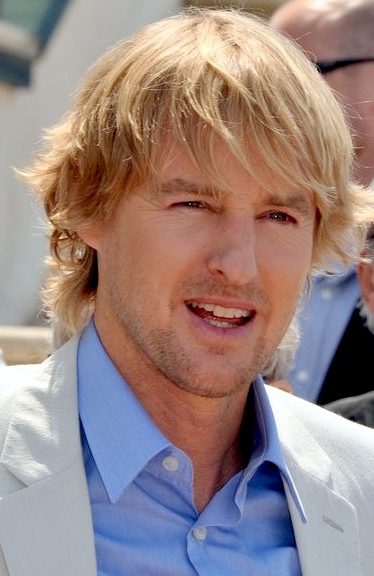
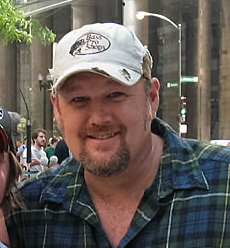
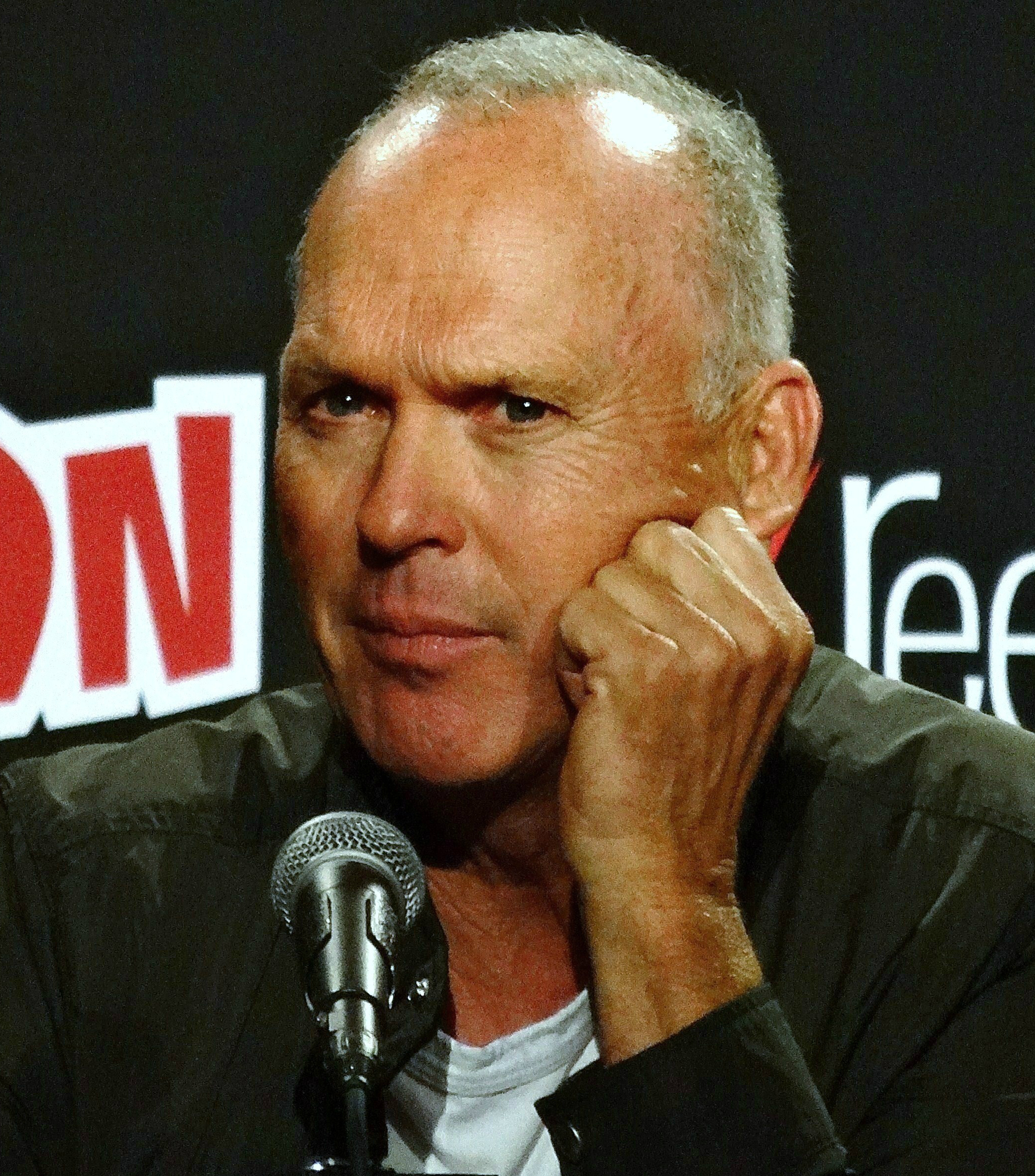
Owen Wilson, Larry the Cable Guy and Michael Keaton reprise their roles as Lightning McQueen, Mater, and Chick Hicks from the film, as do the other actors. In the PlayStation Portable version of the game, Owen Wilson is replaced by Keith Ferguson.

On May 8, 2002, video game publisher THQ acquired the rights to the next three titles from Pixar Animation Studios – Finding Nemo, The Incredibles, and Cars. Cars was announced on February 7, 2006, and was later announced for Wii and Xbox 360. Rainbow Studios known at the time for the MX vs. ATV series, led development for the primary version of the game, which was released on PlayStation 2, GameCube, and Xbox. This version would later be used as a base for the Xbox 360 and Wii ports. On June 6, 2006, THQ announced that the game would be shipping out for all platforms except Wii and Xbox 360. It was shown to the public at E3 2006.

Cars was released on PlayStation 2, GameCube, Xbox, Microsoft Windows, Mac OS X, Game Boy Advance, Nintendo DS and PlayStation Portable on June 6, 2006. The Xbox 360 version would follow on October 23, 2006. The Wii version was released on November 19, 2006 as a launch title for the console. The PlayStation 2, GameCube, Xbox and 360 versions were developed by Rainbow Studios, while the Wii version was developed by Incinerator Games. Beenox were responsible for the Windows port. Locomotive Games developed the PlayStation Portable version. Helixe developed both the Game Boy Advance and Nintendo DS versions.

The console versions feature the full voice-over cast from the film, including the likes of Owen Wilson, Michael Keaton, Paul Newman, and Larry the Cable Guy. However in the PlayStation Portable and Nintendo DS versions, Lightning McQueen is instead voiced by Keith Ferguson. The game's soundtrack utilizes both orchestral and licensed music from the movie, as well as new tracks. Featured licensed tracks include Free Ride by The Edgar Winter Group, Rock This Town by the Stray Cats, What I Want by Autopilot Off, Come On, Let's Go as performed by Los Lobos, and Real Gone by Sheryl Crow, which makes a return from the film.

In 2007 the Entertainment Software Association partnered with Microsoft for that edition of the ESA charity combo pack. For USD $29.99 players would receive Cars, Open Season, and Fuzion Frenzy 2. Proceeds were given to support positive youth programs through the ESA foundation. Proceeds were expected to exceed 2 million dollars.

== Reception ==
Reception

Aggregate score
Aggregator	Score
Metacritic	DS: 54/100; GBA: 50/100; GCN: 71/100; PC: 73/100; PS2: 71/100; PSP: 70/100; XBOX: 70/100; X360: 65/100; WII: 65/100

Review scores
Publication	Score
Eurogamer	(PS2) 4/10 (J2ME) 9/10
GameSpot	(DS) 6.5/10 (GBA) 6.5/10 (GCN/PS2/XBOX) 7.6/10 (PSP) 7.4/10 (X360) 7/10 (WII) 7/10
GameSpy	(DS) 1.5/5 (GCN/PS2/XBOX) 3.5/5 (PSP) 3/5 (WII) 3/5
GamesRadar+	(DS) 2.5/5 (GCN/PS2/XBOX) 3.5/5 (PSP) 3/5
GameZone	(DS) 4.9/10 (GBA) 6.4/10 (GCN) 8/10 (PS2) 7.8/10
IGN	(DS) 5.8/10 (GBA) 3/10 (GCN/PS2/XBOX) 7.2/10 (PSP) 7.5/10 (WII) 6.8/10 (J2ME) 7.2/10

Cars received "mixed or average" reviews. GameSpot gave 7.0 out of 10 for Xbox 360 and Wii versions, 7.6 out of 10 for the GameCube and Xbox versions, and 7.4 out of 10 for the PSP version. Metacritic gave 65 out of 100 for the Wii version, 54 out of 100 for the DS version, 73 out of 100 for the PC version, 71 out of 100 for the PlayStation 2 version, and 70 out of 100 for the PSP version. The PlayStation 2 and Nintendo DS releases of Cars each received a Platinum sales award from the Entertainment and Leisure Software Publishers Association (ELSPA), indicating sales of at least 300,000 copies per version in the United Kingdom. It would also be added to the PlayStation 2 and PlayStation Portable Greatest Hits, GameCube Player's Choice, Xbox Platinum Hits, and Xbox 360 Platinum Hits budget lines. In total, the game sold more than 8 million copies as of May 2007.
