= Joe Ranft =

American animator and voice actor (1960–2005)

- Ranft during a production session for Finding Nemo in 2003
- Born: Joseph Henry Ranft; March 13, 1960; Pasadena, California, U.S.
- Died: August 16, 2005 (aged 45); Mendocino County, California, U.S.
- Education: California Institute of the Arts
- Occupations: Animator; screenwriter; storyboard artist; voice actor
- Years active: 1980–2005
- Employer(s): Walt Disney Feature Animation (1980–1999); Pixar Animation Studios (1992–2005)
- Spouse: Sue Barry (m. 1985)
- Children: Jordan (Jordy) Ranft (actor; born 1991); Sophia Ranft (voice actress; born 1995)
- Relatives: Jerome Ranft (brother; born 1966)

Joseph Henry "Joe" Ranft (March 13, 1960 – August 16, 2005) was an American animator, screenwriter, storyboard artist, and voice actor. He is best known for voicing Elmo St. Peters in The Brave Little Toaster (1987), Heimlich in A Bug's Life (1998), Wheezy in Toy Story 2 (1999) and the spin-off film Buzz Lightyear of Star Command: The Adventure Begins (2000), and Jacques in Finding Nemo (2003), as well as providing vocalizations for Red in Cars (2006). He worked for Pixar Animation Studios and Disney at Walt Disney Animation Studios and Disney Television Animation. His younger brother Jerome Ranft is a sculptor who also worked on several Pixar films.

Ranft's first film credit was a writer for Fun with Mr. Future (1982), followed by his first feature film The Brave Little Toaster in 1987. He received an Academy Award for Best Original Screenplay nomination as one of the writers of Toy Story (1995), and was also the co-director on Cars (2006), his final work before his death.

== Early life ==
Joseph Henry Ranft was born in Pasadena, California, on March 13, 1960, and raised in Whittier. His parents were James and Melissa Ranft. As a child, Ranft developed a love for magic, storytelling, film and comedy. At age 15, he became a member of the Magic Castle Junior Group. After graduating from Monte Vista High School, Whittier, in 1978, Ranft began studying in the character animation program at the California Institute of the Arts alongside John Lasseter and Brad Bird. After two years, Ranft's student film Good Humor caught the attention of Disney animation executives, who offered him a job.

== Career ==
In 1980, Ranft joined Disney as a writer and storyboard artist. During his first five years with Disney, he worked on a number of television projects that were never produced. Later in his Disney career, he was promoted into the Feature Animation department, where he was mentored by Eric Larson. Ranft later spoke about Larson's training: "He always reminds me of just the fundamental things that I tend to forget. You know, it's like, animation is so complex; 'How many drawings are in there?' and stuff, but Eric always comes back to like; 'What does the audience perceive?'"

Around this time, he studied under and began performing with the improvisational group, The Groundlings. Ranft stayed with Disney throughout the 1980s, writing the story on many animated features, including Oliver & Company, The Lion King and Beauty and the Beast. He also worked on The Brave Little Toaster in 1987 for Hyperion Animation and James and the Giant Peach in 1996 for Allied Filmmakers.

Ranft reunited with Lasseter after joining Pixar in October 1992 as their head of story. There he worked on all of their films produced up to 2006; this included Toy Story (for which he received an Academy Award nomination for Best Original Screenplay) and A Bug's Life, as the co-story writer and others as story supervisor. He also voiced characters in many of the films, including Heimlich the caterpillar in A Bug's Life, Wheezy the penguin in Toy Story 2 and its spin-off film Buzz Lightyear of Star Command: The Adventure Begins, and Jacques the shrimp in Finding Nemo, as well as providing vocalizations for Red the fire truck in Cars, which was released posthumously in 2006.

In the film Monsters, Inc., Ranft had a monster named after him (J.J. Ranft) as most of the scarers in the film were named for Pixar staff. Ranft was also given lead story credit on The Brave Little Toaster (1987) and voiced Elmo St. Peters, the appliance salesman.

His favorite writers were Kurt Vonnegut, Hunter S. Thompson, and Tom Wolfe. His favorite magicians were John Carney, Daryl, Michael Ammar, Ricky Jay and Jimmy Grippo.

Ranft was posthumously honored in 2006 as a Disney Legend and in 2016 with the Winsor McCay Award, the lifetime achievement award for animators.

== Death ==
On August 16, 2005, Ranft, 45, and his friend Eric Frierson, 39, were passengers in Ranft's 2004 Honda Element, which was being driven by another friend, Elegba Earl, 32. Earl suddenly lost control and crashed through a guard rail while northbound on Highway 1 in Mendocino County, California. The SUV tumbled down a cliff and plunged 130 feet (40 m) into the mouth of Navarro River, killing Ranft and Earl instantly. Frierson was injured, but survived by escaping through the sunroof. Cars (2006) and Corpse Bride (2005), for which he was respectively a director and producer, were released posthumously and dedicated to him. His remains were cremated.

== Legacy ==
Ranft has been recognized by colleagues and in various tributes in animated films released after his death. Henry Selick called him "the story giant of our generation." In honor of Ranft, in Selick's animated film production Coraline, the moving SUV that moves Coraline into her new apartment is emblazoned with a "Ranft Moving, Inc." logo. The movers themselves are modeled after Ranft and his brother Jerome, who voiced one of the movers. Jerome subsequently voiced the two roles previously established by his brother, providing vocalizations for Red in Cars Toons: Tales from Radiator Springs series (including the 2013 short Bugged) and Cars 3, and speaking Jacques's sole line ("Voilà!") during the post-credits scene of Finding Dory. The 2010 Blu-Ray and DVD re-release of Toy Story 2 includes a special feature that focuses on Ranft and his accomplishments titled "Celebrating Our Friend Joe Ranft". Ranft did early drawings for the character of Finn McMissile in an unused scene from the film Cars, and his drawings were later used in creating the character for Cars 2. John Lasseter has cited Ranft as being one of the main inspirations for the character of Mater from the Cars films and described his influence as being "all over Cars 2". In the film Inside Out, the character of Jangles the Clown is based on a character created by Ranft outside of Pixar named "Buttocks the Clown", according to co-director Ronnie del Carmen and story artist Domee Shi. The end credits of the Pixar film Coco showcase a digital ofrenda with pictures of many Pixar employees and their loved ones who had previously died, including Ranft. Additionally, the 2020 film Soul includes his name on a wall of previous mentors to the character 22.

== Personal life ==
Ranft's younger brother, Jerome (born 1966), is a character sculptor and voice actor. Ranft married Sue Barry in 1985. They had two children, Jordan "Jordy" and Sophia. Jordan (born 1991), is an actor who provided additional voices in A Bug's Life (1998) and voiced Tad the longnose butterflyfish in Finding Nemo (2003, credited as Jordy Ranft), and he later appeared in the live-action short The Newish Testament (2018) as God, and Sophia (born 1995), is a voice actress who provided additional voices in Monsters, Inc. (2001).

== Filmography ==
=== Film ===
Year	Title	Director	Writer	Story Supervisor	Story Artist	Animator	Executive Producer	Other	Voice Role	Notes
1987	The Brave Little Toaster	No	Yes	No	Yes	Directing	No	Yes	Elmo St. Peters/Clown	
1988	Who Framed Roger Rabbit	No	No	No	Yes	No	No	No		Animation: Storysketch
1988	Oliver & Company	No	No	No	Yes	No	No	No		
1989	The Little Mermaid	No	No	No	Yes	No	No	No		Storyboards
1990	The Rescuers Down Under	No	Screenplay	Yes	No	No	No	No		
1991	Beauty and the Beast	No	No	No	Yes	No	No	No		
1993	The Nightmare Before Christmas	No	No	Yes	No	No	No	Yes	Igor	
1994	The Lion King	No	No	No	Yes	No	No	No		
1995	Toy Story	No	Original Story	Yes	No	No	No	Yes	Lenny	
1996	James and the Giant Peach	No	No	Yes	No	No	No	No		
1998	A Bug's Life	No	Original Story	Yes	No	No	No	Yes	Heimlich/Fly	
1999	Toy Story 2	No	No	Yes	No	No	No	Yes	Wheezy/Heimlich	Additional story material
1999	Fantasia 2000	No	No	No	Additional	No	No	No		Additional story artist
2000	Buzz Lightyear of Star Command: The Adventure Begins	No	No	No	No	No	No	Yes	Wheezy	Direct-to-video
2001	Monkeybone	No	No	No	No	No	No	Yes	Streetsquashed Rabbit	
2001	Monsters, Inc.	No	No	No	Yes	No	No	Yes	Pete "Claws" Ward	Additional story material
2003	Finding Nemo	No	No	No	No	No	No	Yes	Jacques	
2004	The Incredibles	No	No	No	No	No	No	Yes	Additional Voices	
2005	Corpse Bride	No	No	No	No	No	Yes	Yes		Posthumous release, dedicated in Ranft's memory
2006	Cars	Co-Director	Yes	Yes	No	No	No	Yes	Red/Peterbilt	Final film voice roles; posthumous release, dedicated in Ranft's memory

=== Short films ===
Year	Title	Writer	Other	Notes
1982	Fun with Mr. Future	Yes	No	
2006	Mater and the Ghostlight	Yes	Yes	Original Story, End credits designer

=== TV specials ===
Year	Title	Writer	Puppeteer
1983	Hansel and Gretel	No	Yes
1987	Sport Goofy in Soccermania	Yes	No

=== Documentaries ===
Year	Title	Role	Notes
2007	The Pixar Story	Himself	Film dedicated in memory
2009	Waking Sleeping Beauty	caricaturist	Film dedicated in memory

=== Video games ===
Year	Title	Voice Role	Notes
1996	Toy Story Animated Storybook	Lenny	
1998	A Bug's Life: The Video Game	Heimlich	
1998	A Bug's Life: Activity Center	Heimlich	Also known as A Bug's Life: Active Play
1999	Toy Story 2: Buzz Lightyear to the Rescue	Wheezy	Also archival audio
2002	Monsters, Inc. Scream Arena	Pete "Claws" Ward	
2003	Finding Nemo: The Video Game	Jacques	
2003	Finding Nemo: Nemo's Underwater World of Fun	Jacques	
2003	Disney's Extreme Skate Adventure	Wheezy	
2007	Cars Mater-National Championship	Red	Final voice role; posthumous release, credit only

=== Theme parks ===
Year	Title	Role	Notes
2002–2018	Heimlich's Chew Chew Train	Heimlich	
2018–present	Heimlich's Candy Corn Toss	Heimlich	Posthumous, archival audio
