= Cars 3: Driven to Win =

2017 video game

- The game's key artwork. From left to right are Cruz Ramirez, Lightning McQueen, and Jackson Storm.
- Developer: Avalanche Software
- Publisher: Warner Bros. Games
- Series: Cars
- Platforms: Wii U; Nintendo Switch; PlayStation 3; PlayStation 4; Xbox 360; Xbox One
- Release: NA: June 13, 2017; EU: July 14, 2017
- Genre: Racing
- Modes: Single-player, multiplayer

Cars 3: Driven to Win is a 2017 racing game developed by Avalanche Software and published by Warner Bros. Games. It is the sequel to Cars: The Video Game and Cars 2: The Video Game. The game is based on the 2017 film of the same name. It is the first Disney game without the involvement of Disney Interactive Studios since its closure on May 10, 2016, and the first game developed by Avalanche Software since it was acquired from Disney and re-established by Warner Bros. The game was released for the Nintendo Switch, PlayStation 3, PlayStation 4, Xbox 360, Xbox One, and Wii U, on June 13, 2017, in North America, in Europe and Australia on July 14, 2017, and in Japan on July 20, 2017.

In the game, set after the events of the third film, the seven-time Piston Cup Champion Lightning McQueen, who has decided to continue his racing career, participates in a "Lightning Storm Cruise" series of challenges organized by his former rival Chick Hicks, with the ultimate goals of beating his rival Jackson Storm in an exhibition race and becoming a "Hall of Fame Master".

== Plot ==
Following Lightning McQueen and Cruz Ramirez's collective victory at the Florida 500, (Note: As depicted in Cars 3 (2017)) Lightning has decided to continue his racing career. After Cruz coaches him on using a simulator where he races against recreations of Doc Hudson, Smokey, Louise Nash, River Scott, and Junior Moon, Lightning appears on Chick Hicks's talk show, Chick's Picks with Chick Hicks. Chick organizes a race between Lightning, Cruz, and Jackson Storm, with Storm allowing them a few warm-up races, and the event is dubbed the "Lightning Storm Cruise".

After Lightning defeats Miss Fritter, Mater the Greater, and Chick Hicks in racing challenges, he has his final race against Storm at the Florida International Super Speedway. Lightning wins, and Storm claims the race was "fixed" for ratings. After Storm then says that he can beat anyone anywhere, he ends up evading Fritter at Thunder Hollow, as Lightning, Cruz, and Chick watch.

== Gameplay ==
The modes that appear in the game are as follows:

- Race: Players must compete to see who can get to the finish line the fastest.
- Battle Race: Racing, but with weapons.
- Takedown: Players must use weapons and power-ups to take out as many other cars as possible. When the timer runs out, the player with the most points wins.
- Stunt Showcase: The objective here is to put on a show by performing jumps and tricks to score points and impress the crowds.
- Best Lap Challenge: Players must try to get the best lap time around a given course.
- Thomasville Playground: A sandbox mode that allows players to go racing, perform stunts, complete challenges, or just cruise around, just like the first game.
- Master Level Events: Players will race with bosses. If the player wins the event it will unlock a specific character. Each event is unlocked upon collecting a certain number of Skill Checks.

When the player starts the game, the player starts with no Skill Checks. They can be completed by fulfilling the requirements on each one. If the player completes a certain number of Skill Checks, the player is able to unlock new events, characters, and tracks.

=== Playable characters ===
There are a total of 23 characters available to play as. Of these characters, six are available from the start at launch, and 16 are unlocked by fulfilling criteria related to Skill Checks. The other character, Fabulous Lightning McQueen, was added via a software update.

- Arvy (Note: Unlocked by earning Skill Checks)
- Bobby Swift
- Brick Yardley
- Cam Spinner
- Chick Hicks (Note: Unlocked in a Master Level Event)
- Cruz Ramirez
- Dr. Damage
- Fabulous Lightning McQueen (Note: Free DLC/update that gets downloaded in the debut of Cars 3 at theaters in a certain country)
- Guido
- Jackson Storm
- Junior Moon
- Lightning McQueen
- Louise Nash
- Mack (Note: Unlocked by collecting all 10 of Mack's Hats in Thomasville Playground)
- Mater
- Mater the Greater
- Miss Fritter
- Natalie Certain
- Ramone
- Rich Mixon
- River Scott
- Sally
- Smokey

== Reception ==
Reception

Aggregate score
Aggregator	Score
Metacritic	NS: 59/100; PS4: 72/100; XONE: 59/100

Review scores
Publication	Score
Nintendo Life	6/10
Push Square	6/10

Cars 3: Driven to Win received "mixed or average" reviews from critics, according to review aggregator website Metacritic.

IGN España said "Cars 3: Driven to Win is a fun game to play with our children, using a Mario Kart style control, but simplifying it rightly. A good number of hours of play to unlock all its contents make the purchase worthwhile if you have children fans of the Pixar film."
