= Lloyd Sherr =

American actor (born 1956)

- Born: Lloyd Michael Sherr; February 28, 1956 (age 70); San Antonio, Texas, U.S.
- Other name: Max Raphael
- Occupation: Voice actor
- Years active: 1984–present
- Children: 2
- Website: lloydsherr.com

Lloyd Michael Sherr (born February 28, 1956), also known by his stage name Max Raphael, is an American voice actor. He is best known for his role as Fillmore in Cars 2 and Cars 3, taking over the role from George Carlin after his death in 2008, as well as his former role as narrator of the History Channel series Modern Marvels.

== Career ==
Sherr has been credited in many forms of media, most notably as narrator of the History Channel show Modern Marvels, for which his voice has become a trademark of the History Channel. Sherr (credited as Raphael) has also narrated other History Channel series such as Command Decisions, Engineering Disasters, and Dogfights.

He is known for voice-over work in various video games, such as Cronos in God of War II, bounty-hunter Calo Nord in Star Wars: Knights of the Old Republic, Diego in Gothic 3 and EverQuest II.

One of Sherr's most notable roles was The Moper in the 1984 film Revenge of the Nerds. Sherr played a man who was currently being held on a charge of mopery, which is exposing oneself to a blind person.

On television, he performed the roles of Vathek in W.I.T.C.H., Jibolba in the Nickelodeon series Tak and the Power of Juju, Everett in Back at the Barnyard, Father in Star Wars: The Clone Wars, and the narrator in Random! Cartoons. He has also voiced narration for videos produced by Scientology regarding Thetan existence, and the eight dynamics. Sherr is also the voice of Fillmore in the Cars franchise, replacing George Carlin following his death.

Sherr's stage name is a combination of his children's names, Max and Raphael.

Sherr has also performed voice acting work for several Scientology productions.

== Filmography ==
=== Film ===
Year	Title	Role	Notes
2007	Say the Secret Word	Corn Dog Spy (voice)	
2008	Fly Me to the Moon	Mission Control (voice)	
2008	Gnomes and Trolls: The Secret Chamber	Jalle (voice)	
2011	Cars 2	Fillmore, Combat Ship (voice)	
2013	Turbo	Spanish DJ (voice)	
2017	Cars 3	Fillmore (voice)	
2018	The Last Prince of Atlantis	Balthazar (voice)	
TBA	Troll Hunters	Jalle (voice)	

=== Television ===
Year	Title	Role	Notes
1993	Teenage Mutant Ninja Turtles	Captain Dread (voice)	Episode: "Escape from the Planet of the Turtleoids"
1996–2004	Hey Arnold!	Tape Voice, Restaurant Captain, Salon Man (voice)	
2000	Monster Machines	Narrator (voice)	Unknown episodes
2004	Mega Machines	Narrator (voice)	Unknown episodes
2004–06	W.I.T.C.H.	Vathek, Guard #2, Coach O'Neill, Sandpit (voice)	10 episodes
2007–08	Tak and the Power of Juju	Jibolba (voice)	Recurring role
2007–10	Back at the Barnyard	Everett, various voices	
2008	Crisis Point	Narrator (voice)	6 episodes
2009	Random! Cartoons	Narrator (voice)	Episode: "Dr. Dee and Bit Boy"
2009	Moments of Impact/Adrenaline Rush Hour	Narrator (voice)	13 episodes
2010	Scooby-Doo! Mystery Incorporated	Lord Barry, Paramedic, Nerd Pirate (voice)	Episode: "The Grasp of the Gnome"
2011–12	Archer	Detective Murphy, Superintendent, Paddy (voice)	2 episodes
2011	Star Wars: The Clone Wars	Father (voice)	3 episodes
2013–14	Tales from Radiator Springs	Fillmore (voice)	3 episodes
2015	Star vs. the Forces of Evil	Mewni Merchant (voice)	Episode: "Diaz Family Vacation"
2022	Cars on the Road	Fillmore (voice)	Episode: "Dino Park"
2027	Cars: Lightning Racers	Fillmore (voice)	Upcoming series

=== Video games ===
Year	Title	Role	Notes
1999	Battlezone II: Combat Commander	Male Ensemble	
2002	Medal of Honor: Allied Assault	Additional voices	
2002	Age of Mythology	Setna, Theocrat	
2003	RTX Red Rock	Old Soul #1	
2003	Star Wars: Knights of the Old Republic	Calo Nord, Tanis Venn, Viglo, Slave	
2004	EverQuest II	Various voices	
2005	James Bond 007: From Russia with Love	Additional voices	
2006	Gothic 3	Diego	
2006	The Lord of the Rings: The Battle for Middle-earth II: The Rise of the Witch-king	Hwaldar, Chieftain of Rhudaur	
2006	SOCOM U.S. Navy SEALs: Combined Assault	Senator Lloyd Thomason	
2006	SOCOM U.S. Navy SEALs: Fireteam Bravo 2	Senator Lloyd Thomason	
2007	God of War II	Cronos	
2008	Tak and the Guardians of Gross	Jibolba	
2008	SpongeBob SquarePants Featuring Nicktoons: Globs of Doom	Jibolba	
2009	The Lord of the Rings: Conquest	Saruman	
2009	Infamous	Male Pedestrian	
2009	Ratchet & Clank Future: A Crack in Time	Kip Darling	
2009	Cars Race-O-Rama	Fillmore	
2009	Dragon Age: Origins	Spirit of Valor	
2009	Legendary	Lexington	
2010	Command & Conquer 4: Tiberian Twilight	Additional voices	
2011	Dead or Alive: Dimensions	Shiden	
2011	Cars 2	Fillmore	
2011	Ratchet & Clank: All 4 One	Kip Darling	
2011	Skylanders: Spyro's Adventure	Additional voices	
2011	NCIS Video Game	Benjamin Pramas	
2012	Armored Core V	City Police Officer D, AC Pilot, Narrator	
2012	Diablo III	Captain Hale	Also Reaper of Souls DLC
2012	Starhawk	Rifters, Captain Bennett	
2012	Syndicate	Additional voices	
2012	Skylanders: Giants	Additional voices	
2013	BioShock Infinite: Burial at Sea	Additional voices	
2013	Disney Infinity	Fillmore	
2014	World of Warcraft: Warlords of Draenor	Additional voices	
2016	Mafia III	Additional voices	
2017	Dishonored: Death of the Outsider	Workers	
2024	Final Fantasy VII Rebirth	Doctor Sheiran	

=== Live-action ===
Year	Title	Role	Notes
1984	Revenge of the Nerds	The Moper	
2003	The Big Chingon	Ivan	
2009	Black Russian	Ivan	
2013	Marked by the Mob	—N/a	Miniseries; 4 episodes
2017	Hate Crime	Radio News Man	
2018	Hotel Artemis	KT-Eye News Anchor	

=== Theme park attractions ===
Year	Title	Role	Notes
2012	Radiator Springs Racers	Fillmore	
2021	Cars: Road Trip	Fillmore	
