= Sally Carrera =

Fictional character from Cars (film)

- Cars character
- Sally as she appears in Cars
- First appearance: Cars (2006)
- Created by: John Lasseter; Joe Ranft; Jorgen Klubien
- Voiced by: Bonnie Hunt (2006–present); Sofie Volez (Cars 3: Driven to Win)

In-universe information
- Species: Porsche 996
- Gender: Female
- Occupation: Town attorney, Hotelier
- Significant other: Lightning McQueen

Sally Carrera is a fictional anthropomorphic 2002 Porsche 911 Carrera and a major character in the Disney/Pixar Cars franchise. She is the town attorney for Radiator Springs, having relocated there from Los Angeles, California where she was a successful lawyer. Her appearances include the feature films Cars, Cars 2, and Cars 3 as well as the TV series Cars on the Road. She is also a playable character in Cars: The Video Game and Cars 3: Driven to Win. She is voiced by Bonnie Hunt.

Sally is the love interest of Piston Cup racer Lightning McQueen, whom she first meets when he is sentenced to community service after destroying Radiator Springs' main road. Sally and McQueen's feelings for each other grow stronger throughout Cars, with the two entering a relationship near the end of the film. Sally appears again in Cars 2 and Cars 3 as a supporting character.

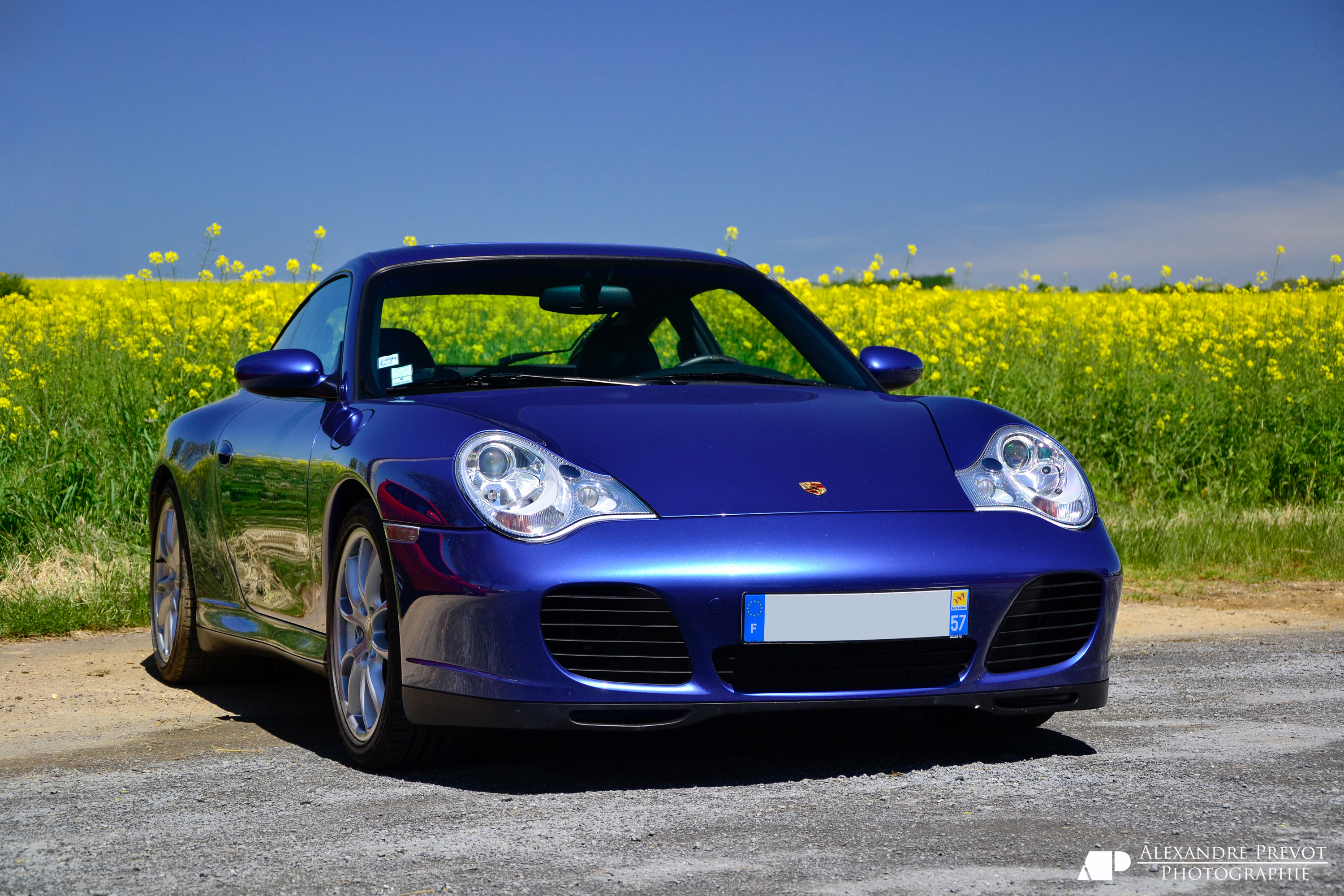
A Porsche 996 similar to Sally's model

== Character design ==
Sally is a 2002 Porsche 996 Carrera on a slightly shortened wheelbase and has a pinstripe tattoo on her engine cover. Pixar had initially wanted an older Porsche 911 for the role, but were convinced by Bob Carlson at Porsche to make her the latest model. Pixar's animators, modelers and sound crews obtained access to real Porsche 911 vehicles to meticulously create Sally as an animated Porsche that looks, moves, and responds in a similar manner to the real-life automobile.

"It's the nicest body I've ever had on film. I'm telling you, it's a luxury. I really thought they were going to cast me as a Buick."

— Bonnie Hunt on being Sally, a Porsche

According to director John Lasseter. "Sally is the one modern car in the town of Radiator Springs. She's beautiful. It's interesting that people mostly think of a Porsche as powerful and a guy's car, but the lines on a Porsche are so beautiful that it fits perfectly for the character of Sally."

== Background ==
Sally's personality is based on Dawn Welch of the historic Rock Café on U.S. Route 66 in Oklahoma, an advocate of the promotion and restoration of Stroud, Oklahoma after the town had been both bypassed by the Turner Turnpike and heavily damaged by a 1999 F3 tornado. Welch had long traveled cross-country promoting Route 66 and rallying support for keeping it alive. Like Sally, Dawn Welch is a relative newcomer to U.S. Route 66, having left the travel industry to purchase the Rock Café in 1993 and list it on the National Register of Historic Places in 2001.

"We met people out on Route 66 and we're thinking, at first, 'What are you doing here? You've travelled the world. You're educated. You speak three languages. But you run a restaurant out in the middle of nowhere.' But then, after an hour of having dinner with this person, you think, 'Wow, this is perfect. I'm so glad you're here because you're keeping it alive.'"

— Jonas Rivera, Pixar production chief for Cars

== Appearances ==
=== Cars (2006) ===
When Lightning McQueen sees Sally in traffic court for the first time, he mistakes her as being from his own attorney's office and attempts to flirt with her. Sally is unamused with Lightning's actions at first and convinces the judge, Doc Hudson, to sentence him to repave the road he destroyed as community service. Later, Sally attends the race between Lightning and Doc at Willy's Butte after Lightning failed to repave the road correctly, in which Lightning loses and crashes into a cactus patch.

Later, Sally starts to warm up to Lightning after seeing what a good job he has done repaving the road. She offers him to stay at her motel for the night instead of Mater's impound. The next day, Sally invites Lightning to take a drive with her. She leads him to the Wheel Well Motel, an abandoned motor court in Tailfin Pass and the former most popular stop on Route 66. Sally tells Lightning the story of how she grew tired of and left her fast-paced life as a lawyer in Los Angeles and found Radiator Springs, and how the town was originally popular but got bypassed and taken off the map by the interstate.

When Lightning finishes repaving the road, he surprises everyone in town when he decides to stay instead of heading to the race. When night falls, Sally arrives at the town center to find Lightning stripped of his racing modifications and outfitted with a new Corvette inspired paintjob and whitewall tires. Radiator Springs' neon lights start shining, and the whole town starts cruising to Sh-boom, fulfilling Sally's wish and opening up her love for Lightning McQueen. Suddenly, a swarm of news reporter cars and race officials enter the town and surround Lightning, forcing him to leave. After Sally finds out that Doc Hudson gave the authorities Lightning McQueen's location, she admonishes him for sending Lightning away and returns to her motel.

Sally later watches the tiebreaker race from Radiator Springs with Lizzie and Red while Doc and the other residents of Radiator Springs go to the tie-breaker race to help Lightning McQueen. She witnesses Lightning help The King after suffering a rollover crash caused by Chick Hicks, and later greets Lightning again at the Wheel Well Motel. Lightning tells Sally that the town has been put back on the map and that he is setting up his racing headquarters there. The two attempt to kiss, but are interrupted by Mater flying in a Dinoco helicopter. The two later race back to Radiator Springs to celebrate the town's newfound popularity.

=== Cars 2 (2011) ===
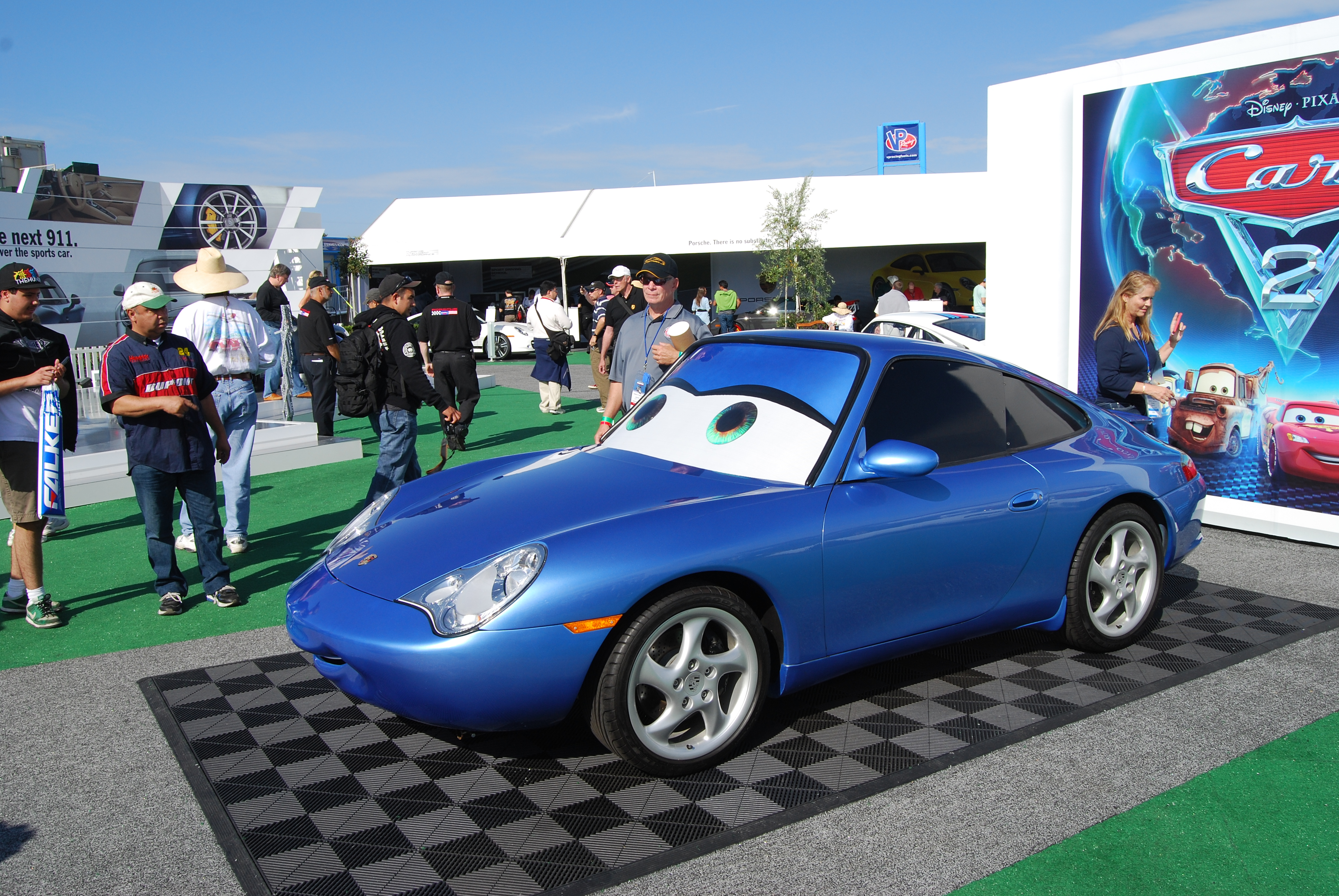
A Sally model at a car show

In Cars 2, Sally's relationship with Lightning McQueen has grown stronger over time. After Lightning returns to Radiator Springs from a successful Piston Cup season, the two go on a date at the Wheel Well Motel, which has been converted into a restaurant. Soon Sally and Lightning find Mater arguing with Italian racer and World Grand Prix competitor Francesco Bernoulli, who Sally reveals to have an interest in. Lightning goes to defend Mater, and winds up entering himself into the World Grand Prix, which is taking place overseas in three countries. Sally agrees to let Lightning compete but asks him to bring Mater along, telling him that he has never let Mater attend any of his races. Lightning agrees, and Team McQueen heads out to Japan for the first race, leaving Sally with Red, Sheriff, Ramone, Flo, and Lizzie to run Radiator Springs.

Later, Sally travels to London after Lightning calls her asking where Mater is. She stays in the pits when Lightning finds Mater and goes after him trying to apologize, and is shocked when she sees on TV that Mater has rocket jets that allow him to travel at an incredible speed with Lightning McQueen in tow. Sally witnesses Mater uncover Miles Axelrod as the mastermind behind the plot against alternative fuel at Buckingham Palace, and attends Mater's royal knighthood by the Queen of England.

=== Cars 3 (2017) ===
In Cars 3, Sally continues to be Lightning McQueen's girlfriend, and attends his races to show support. She is present when Lightning crashes while trying to keep up with the nextgens, and when she checks in on him four months later while he is recovering, she gives him the inspiration to continue racing. When Lightning is summoned to the Rust-eze Training Center, Sally chooses to stay with the other cars in Radiator Springs. While saying goodbye to his friends, Lightning thanks Sally for her support and tells her that he loves her; she replies that she loves him more.

At the Florida 500, Sally witnesses firsthand Jackson Storm's rude behavior. Later, Sally celebrates with Lightning after it is revealed that he won the race despite him replacing himself with Cruz Ramirez mid-race; and she introduces herself to Sterling as Lightning's lawyer while pointing out that Lightning's win allows him to retain his right to continue racing. She also compliments Lightning for being a great teacher to Cruz, and he reveals that he plans to continue racing but will first act as Cruz's crew chief for the rest of the season.
