= Brian Fee =

American filmmaker

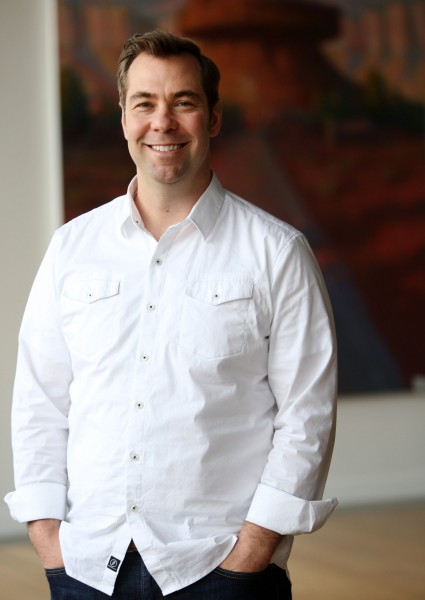
- Fee in 2017
- Occupations: Storyboard artist; film director; voice actor
- Years active: 1998–present
- Employer: Pixar Animation Studios (2003–2023)
- Children: 2

Brian Fee is an American storyboard artist, director, and voice actor best known for his work at Pixar Animation Studios where he made his directorial debut with the feature film Cars 3 (2017), the third film of the Cars franchise.

== Filmography ==
=== Films ===
Year	Title	Director	(Original) Story by	Story Artist	Animator	Designer	Other	Notes
2000	The Adventures of Rocky and Bullwinkle	No	No	No	Assistant	No	No	Assistant Animator: Traditional Animation
2000	The Little Mermaid II: Return to the Sea	No	No	No	No	Prop	No	Direct-to-video
2000	Joseph: King of Dreams	No	No	No	Character builders	No	No	Direct-to-video
2006	Cars	No	No	Yes	No	No	Yes	Voices of Al Oft the Lightyear Blimp
2007	Ratatouille	No	No	Additional	No	No	No	
2008	WALL-E	No	No	Yes	No	No	No	
2011	Cars 2	No	No	Yes	No	No	No	
2013	Monsters University	No	No	Yes	No	No	No	
2017	Cars 3	Yes	Yes	No	No	No	No	

=== Independent ===
Year	Title	Producer	Cinematographer	Other	Role	Notes
2009	Tracy	Yes	Yes	Yes	Tracy Knapp / Albert Knapp Sr.	Extras, additional music

=== Shorts ===
Year	Title	Director	Story Artist	Animator	Notes
1999	Fractured Fairy Tales: The Phox, the Box & the Lox	No	No	Assistant	Animation Assistant
2000	The Indescribable Nth	No	No	Assistant	Assistant Animator
2022	Cars on the Road	Yes	Yes	No	Directed episodes 3, 4, and 7

=== Television ===
Year	Title	Role	Notes
2000	Harvey Birdman, Attorney at Law	Animator, assisting & clean-up	Episode: Bannon Custody Case

=== Other credits ===
Pixar Senior Creative Team

- Inside Out (2015)
- The Good Dinosaur (2015)
- Finding Dory (2016)
- Cars 3 (2017)
- Coco (2017)
- Incredibles 2 (2018)
- Toy Story 4 (2019)
- Onward (2020)
- Soul (2020)
- Luca (2021)
- Turning Red (2022)
- Lightyear (2022)
- Cars on the Road (2022)
- Elemental (2023)

Special Thanks

- BURN-E (2008)
- Miss Fritter's Racing Skoool (2017)
