= List of Cars characters =

Cast of Disney media franchise

Cars is a media franchise including the 2006 film Cars, the 2011 film Cars 2, the 2017 film Cars 3, the 2022 series Cars on the Road, the 2013 film Planes, and the 2014 film Planes: Fire & Rescue. This page is a list of characters that have appeared in the franchise.

== Piston Cup Championship ==
=== Lightning McQueen ===
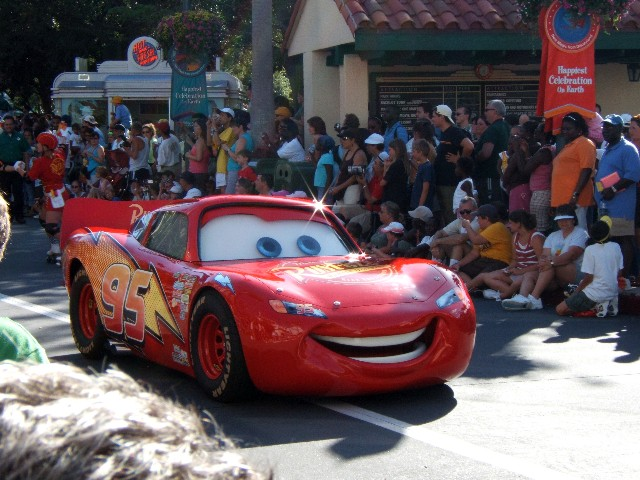
Lightning McQueen in a Disneyland parade

Montgomery "Monty" McQueen, more commonly called Lightning McQueen (voiced by Owen Wilson in the films, Cars on the Road, video game adaption, Kinect Rush: A Disney-Pixar Adventure, and Lego The Incredibles, Ben Rausch in Cars 3: Driven to Win, and Keith Ferguson in Cars Toons and most video games), is a 2006 custom-built race car who competes in the Piston Cup Racing Series, with 95 as his racing number. His design is a hybrid of Generation 4 NASCAR vehicles and Le Mans endurance racers. Lightning was initially very arrogant until becoming stranded in Radiator Springs on U.S. Route 66, where he learned about the importance of humility. He has since taken permanent residence there and has made the town the site of his racing headquarters. He is Mater’s best friend and is Sally's boyfriend. His signature catchphrases are "ka-chow" and "I am speed", which have become synonymous with the Cars franchise as a whole.

=== Mack ===
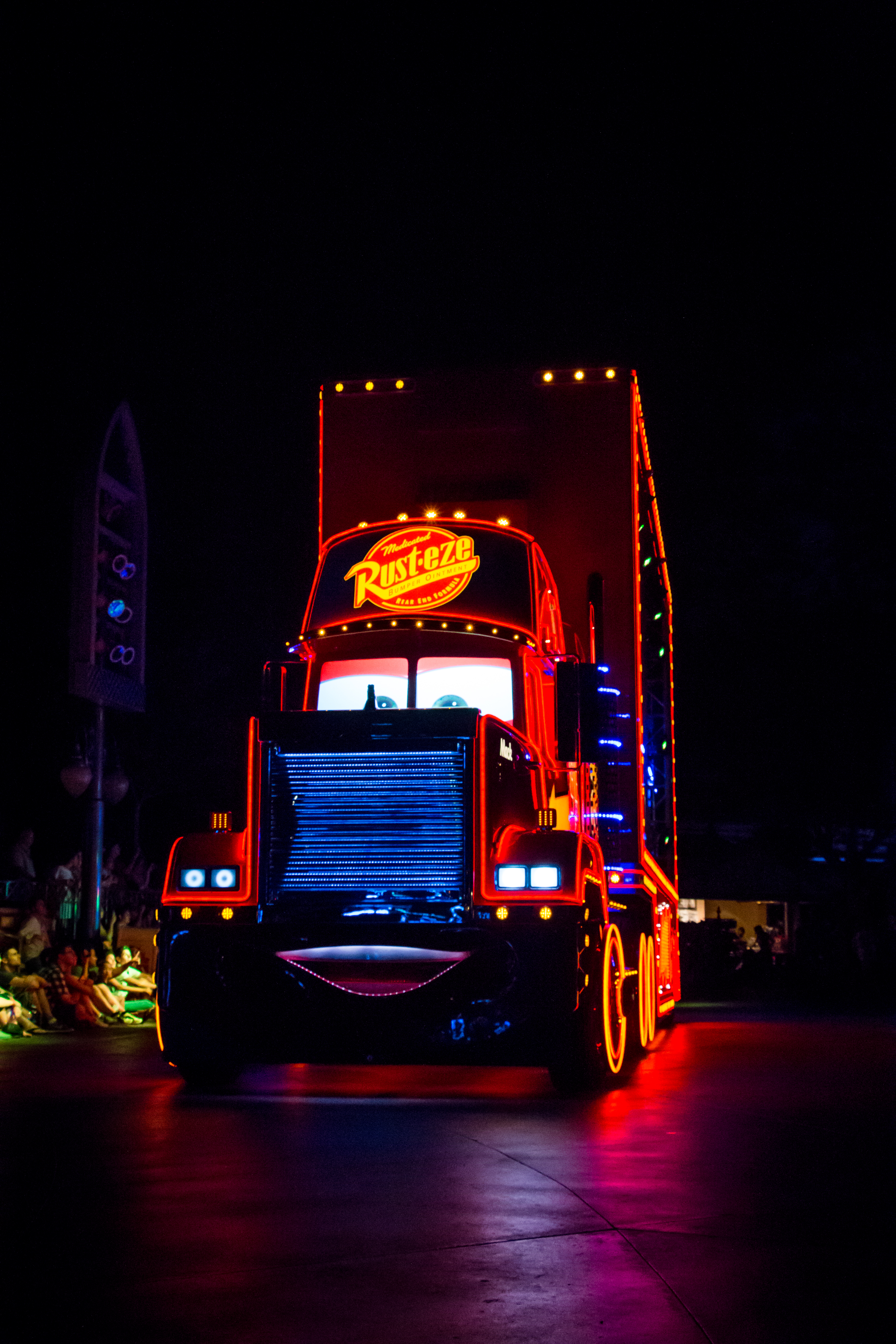
Mack in a Paint the Night parade in Disneyland

Mack (voiced by John Ratzenberger, whose father drove a Mack truck) is a modified 1985 Mack Super-Liner class 8 truck who serves as Lightning's loyal transporter. After the Dinoco 400, Lightning convinces Mack to drive all night to the tie-breaker race in Los Angeles despite that federal DOT regulations grant Mack ten hours to rest. Mack struggles to stay awake as a result, with an ensuing mishap causing Lightning to fall out of Mack's trailer. Mack later arrives in Radiator Springs to retrieve McQueen after his location is revealed and becomes a resident of the town with McQueen. He returns as a minor character in Cars 2 and as a supporting character in Cars 3.

=== Sterling ===
Sterling (voiced by Nathan Fillion) is a wealthy business car who briefly becomes the new owner of Rust-eze Bumper Ointment in Cars 3. He resembles a modernized 1968 BMW E9. After meeting Lightning, Sterling assigns Cruz to train him and prepare him for the Florida 500. After watching Lightning's poor performance on the racing simulator, Sterling attempts to force him into retirement. Lightning agrees to retire if he loses the upcoming Florida 500, but otherwise keeps his right to decide. After Lightning and Cruz both win the Florida 500, Cruz declines Sterling's offer to race for him and accepts Tex Dinoco instead, who purchases Rust-eze from Sterling.

=== Cruz Ramirez ===
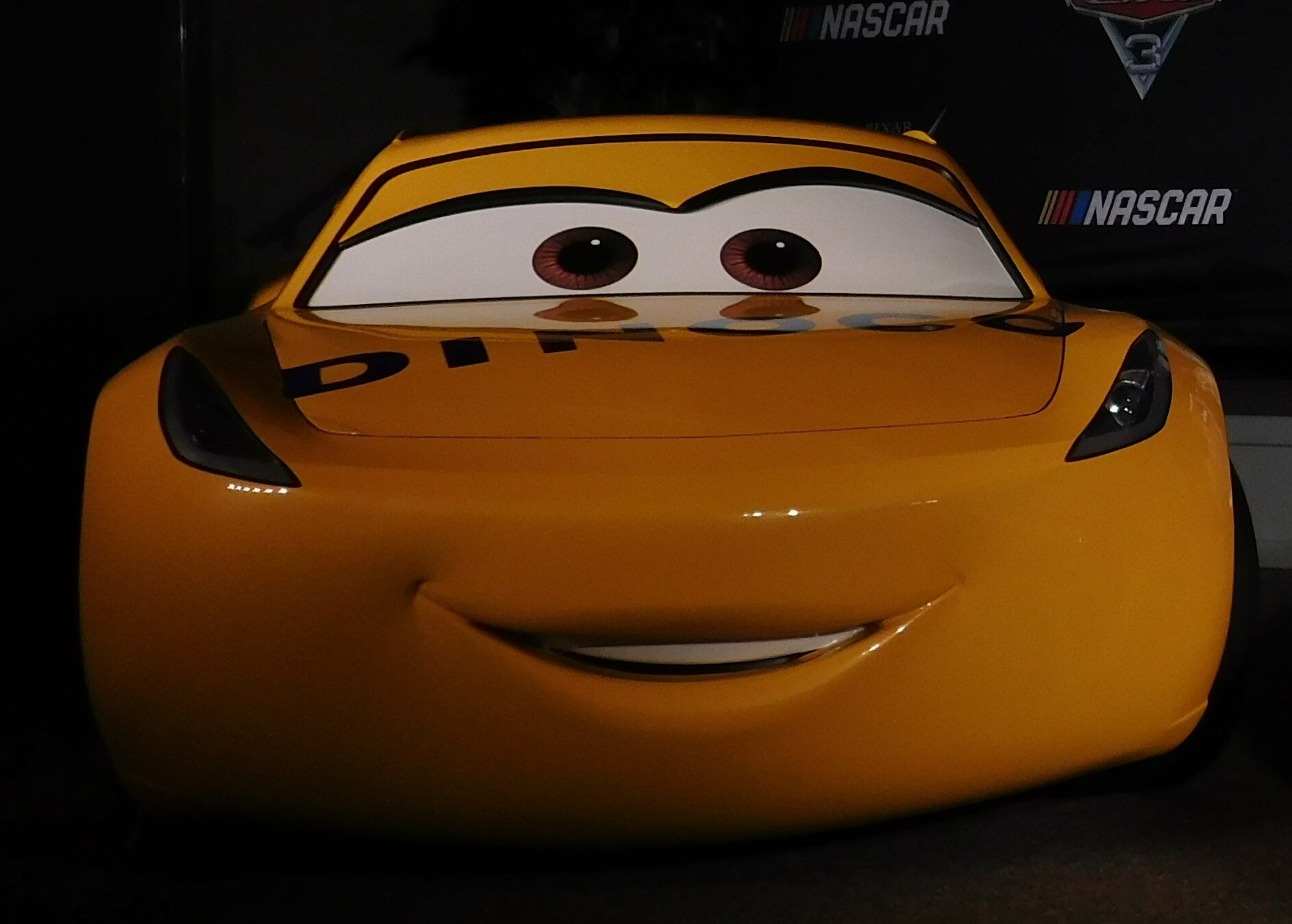
A front view of Cruz Ramirez

Cruz Ramirez (voiced by Cristela Alonzo) is Lightning's trainer and technician at the Rust-eze Racing Center. She is a yellow high-performance sports car that has styling characteristics of a Jaguar F-Type and Chevrolet Corvette (C7). Cruz is known for training some of the best rookie race cars through her unconventional training methods. After Sterling introduces Cruz to Lightning, he assigns her to train Lightning for the Florida 500. At the Florida 500, Sterling orders Cruz back to the racing center to train one of the rookies. Lightning overhears the exchange on his radio and exits the race to allow Cruz to take his place, giving her a chance to become a racer. Using what she learned from Lightning and Smokey, Cruz catches up to Jackson Storm. Storm is furious at the thought of a standard production car beating him in a race and rams Cruz into the wall on the final lap, but she manages to evade him and wins. Cruz later accepts Tex Dinoco's offer to race for his team and chooses 51 as her racing number as a tribute to Doc Hudson. She returns as a playable character in Cars 3: Driven to Win.

=== Strip Weathers ===
Strip "The King" Weathers (voiced by Richard Petty) is a veteran race car and racing legend. Weathers is an anthropomorphic version of Petty's 1970 Plymouth Superbird stock car, sporting the same shade of blue and Petty's racing number, 43, as well as being a fictionalized version of Petty himself. He is one of the racers in the Dinoco 400 three-way tie, along with Chick Hicks and Lightning McQueen. Known as Dinoco's "Golden Boy" having won a total of seven Piston Cups, Weathers is hoping for his eighth win in the tiebreaker race before entering retirement. He returns in Cars 3 as the crew chief of his nephew, Cal Weathers.

=== Tex Dinoco ===
Tex Dinoco (voiced by Humpy Wheeler) is a gold 1975 Cadillac Coupe de Ville who owns Dinoco Oil and is the boss of the Dinoco racing team. His most well known racer is Strip "The King" Weathers, who won the Piston Cup a total of seven times before his retirement. In Cars, Tex refused to give Chick Hicks a Dinoco sponsorship after he intentionally caused The King to crash and offered it to McQueen instead, although McQueen respectfully declined due to his newfound respect for Rust-eze. In Cars 3, Tex purchases Rust-eze Bumper Ointment from Sterling, thus allowing Lightning McQueen to race alongside Cruz under the merged Rust-eze/Dinoco brand.

=== Darrell Cartrip ===
Darrell Cartrip (voiced by Darrell Waltrip in Cars, Cars 2, Cars 3, Cars: The Video Game, and Cars 3: Driven to Win) is a retired Piston Cup racer who serves as an RSN commentator alongside Bob Cutlass for Piston Cup series races, and also briefly for Miles Axlerod's World Grand Prix. Cartrip is known for his comedic and lighthearted style of commentary, contrasting other announcers' more traditional approach. He is based on a 1977 Chevrolet Monte Carlo stock car and is painted metallic silver with a red and yellow flame design on his front end.

=== Chick Hicks ===
Chick Hicks (voiced by Michael Keaton in Cars, Cars: The Video Game, and Cars Race-O-Rama, and Bob Peterson in Cars 3) is a green stock car and Lightning's main rival. Chick is an arrogant race car who often cheats to gain position in races. He is sponsored by Hostile Takeover Bank and resembles a 1987 Buick Regal Grand National, with his grill resembling a 1980s-style mustache. His racing number is 86. Chick frequently antagonizes McQueen, and even lifts his catchphrase "ka-chow", modifying it to "ka-chicka", to both boost his popularity, and to annoy McQueen. He wins the final race in the first movie after taking out the King, but finds that that does not gain him the popularity he so craved when an angered crowd and media boo him for his actions. In Cars 3, Hicks has retired from racing and hosts his own talk show, Chick's Picks on Racing Sports Network, where he continues to mock McQueen at every opportunity, repeatedly bringing up his Piston Cup victory over McQueen in the first movie, implying that he retired after the championship. Hicks returns in Cars: The Video Game, Cars: Race-O-Rama, and also Cars 3: Driven to Win as a boss and playable character.

=== Jackson Storm ===
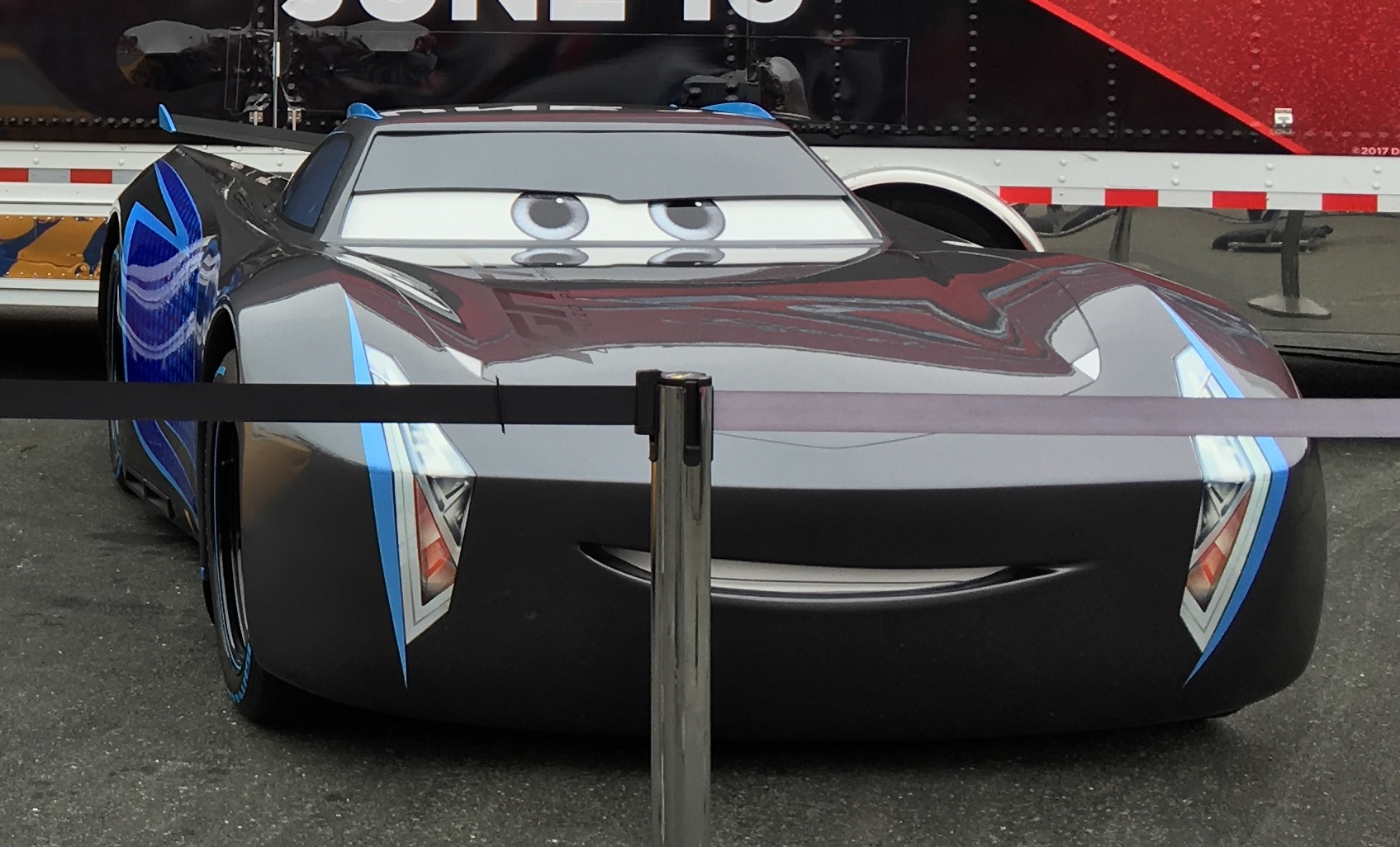
Jackson Storm

Jackson Storm (voiced by Armie Hammer in the film, AJ Hamilton in Cars 3: Driven to Win) is an arrogant custom-built "next-gen" race car, and Lightning's main rival in Cars 3. Storm is stated to be technologically superior to Lightning and the other "last-gen" racers in nearly every way, and his fastest speed is recorded as 214 miles per hour at Florida International Super Speedway. In the film, Storm appears out of nowhere and starts winning race after race, forcing many last-generation race cars to retire. During the last race of the season, Lightning pushes himself too hard while trying to compete with Storm and loses control, resulting in a rollover crash. At the Florida 500, Storm is intimidated by Lightning's former trainer Cruz Ramirez, who replaces Lightning in the race. He attempts to make her lose focus by telling her that she is not the type of car who belongs on a racetrack. Cruz regains her confidence and drives up next to Storm, who rams her into a wall. Cruz manages to flip over Storm at the last moment, passing him and wins the race, it is unknown what happened to Storm after losing to Cruz. Storm's racing number is 20, styled 2.0.

== Radiator Springs ==
=== Tow Mater ===
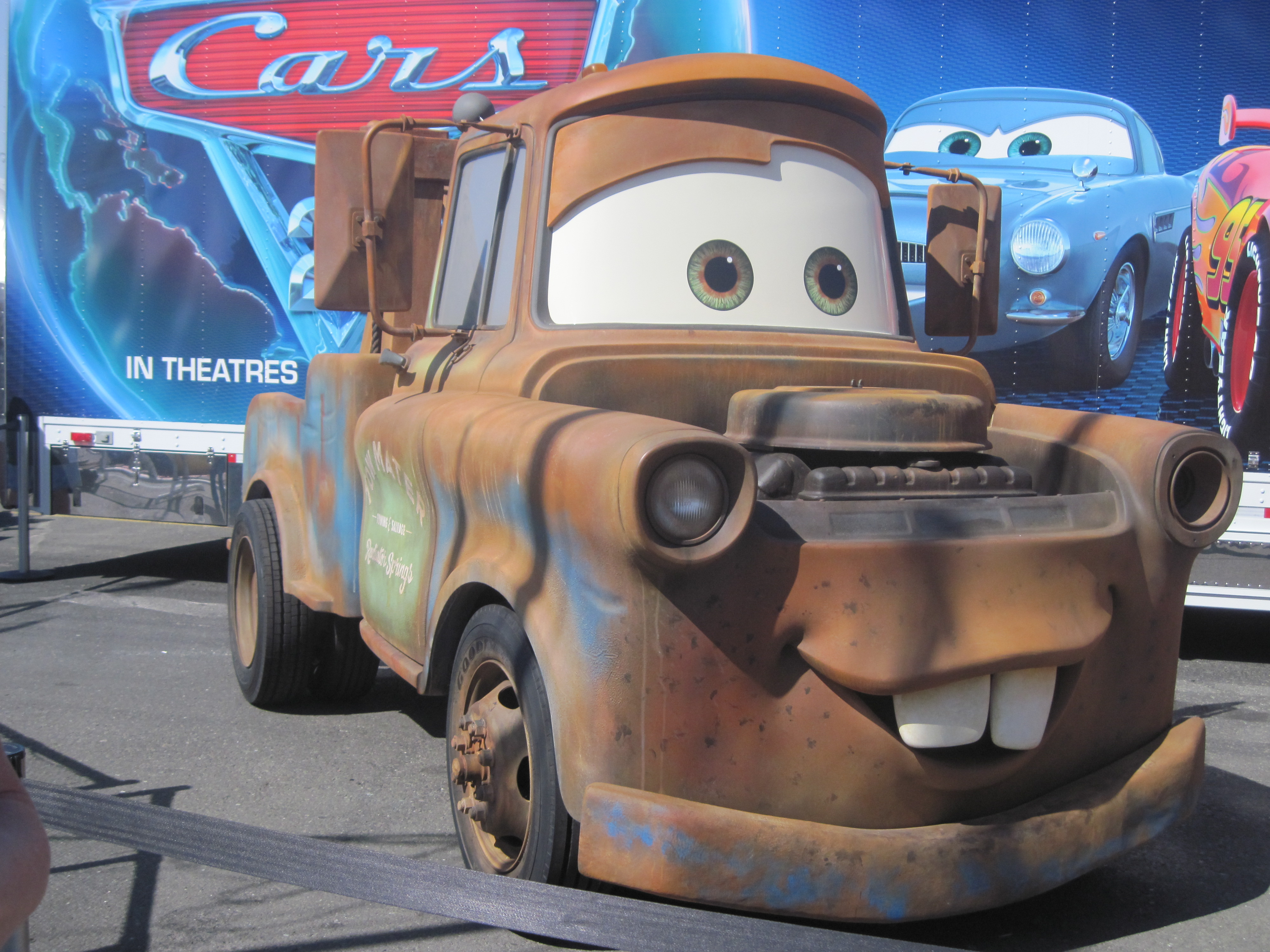
Mater replica on tour for Cars 2

Sir Tow Mater, better known as simply Mater, (voiced by Larry the Cable Guy), is a rusty blue Southern-accented tow truck resembling a 1957 Chevrolet Task Force. Mater is the primary tow truck in Radiator Springs and operates his own salvage yard. He is Lightning's best friend and eagerly supports him both on and off the racetrack.

In Cars 2, Mater returns as the main protagonist of the second film and was chosen by McQueen to be his crew chief in the World Grand Prix until being mistaken for a C.H.R.O.M.E. agent by spy in training Holley Shiftwell. Mater becomes Shiftwell's boyfriend later in the film. Mater returns in Cars 3 as a supporting character.

=== Sally Carrera ===
Sally Carrera (voiced by Bonnie Hunt) is Radiator Springs' town attorney and Lightning's girlfriend. She is a 2002 Porsche 911 Carrera. In addition to being the town attorney, Sally is also the hotel manager of the Cozy Cone Motel, which is based on the Wigwam Motel. She is a major character in Cars and a supporting character in Cars 2 and Cars 3.

In 2022, Porsche made a one-off Porsche 911 in collaboration with Pixar as a tribute to the character, referred to as the "Sally Special".

=== Doc Hudson ===
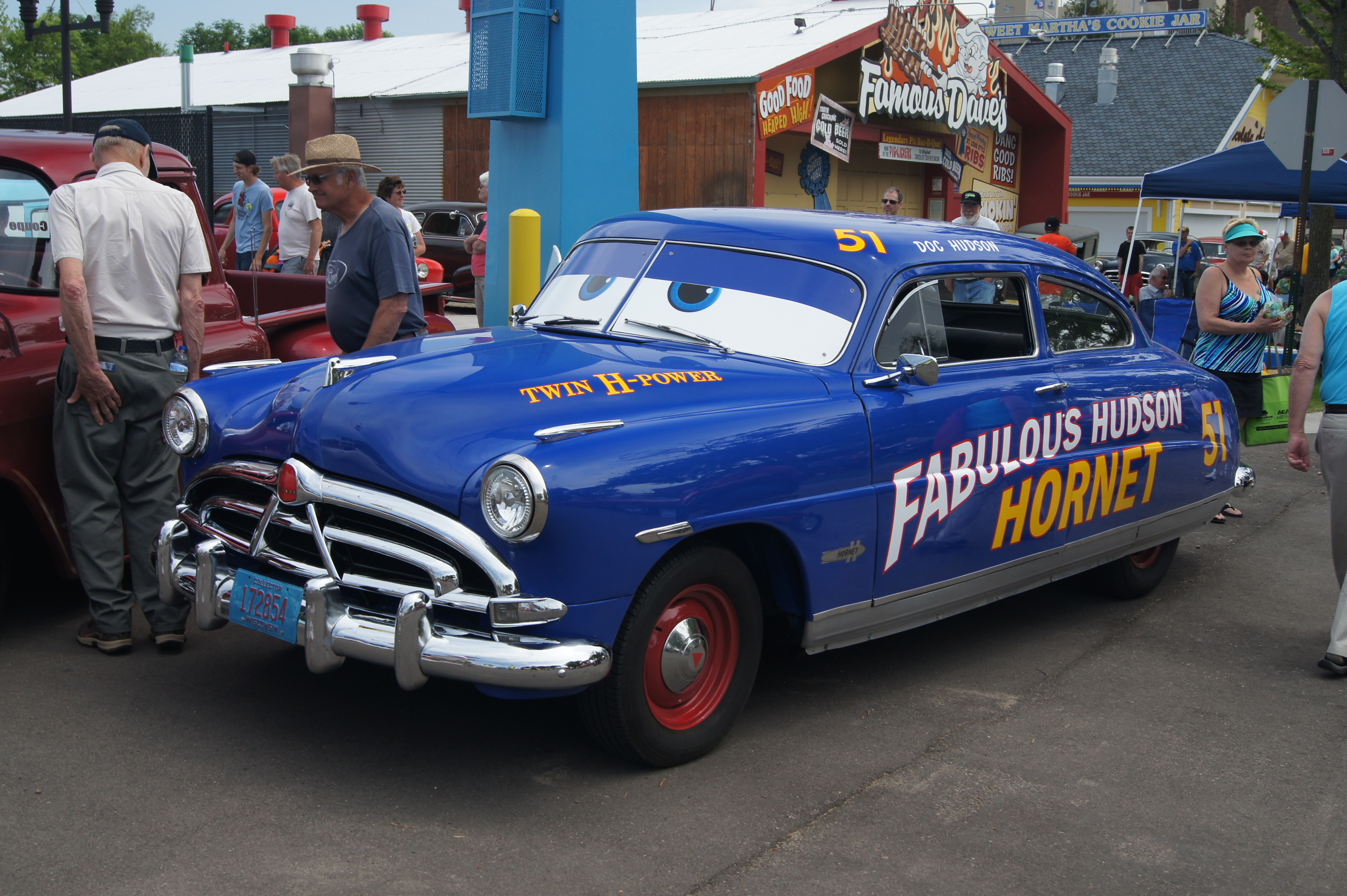
Doc Hudson in Minneapolis

Doc Hudson (voiced by Paul Newman in the first and third films and the video game adaptation of the first film, and Corey Burton in Cars Mater-National and Cars Race-O-Rama) was Radiator Springs' medical doctor, judge, and Lightning's mentor/crew chief. He is a 1951 Hudson Hornet who raced in the Piston Cup as the Fabulous Hudson Hornet until an accident prematurely ended his career. Paul Newman, his voice actor, died in September 2008, and it is implied that Hudson died at some point between Cars and Cars 2. Doc appeared in Cars 3 in flashbacks, being voiced by archival recordings of Newman. He was based on Hudson Hornet drivers Marshall Teague and Herb Thomas.

=== Sheriff ===
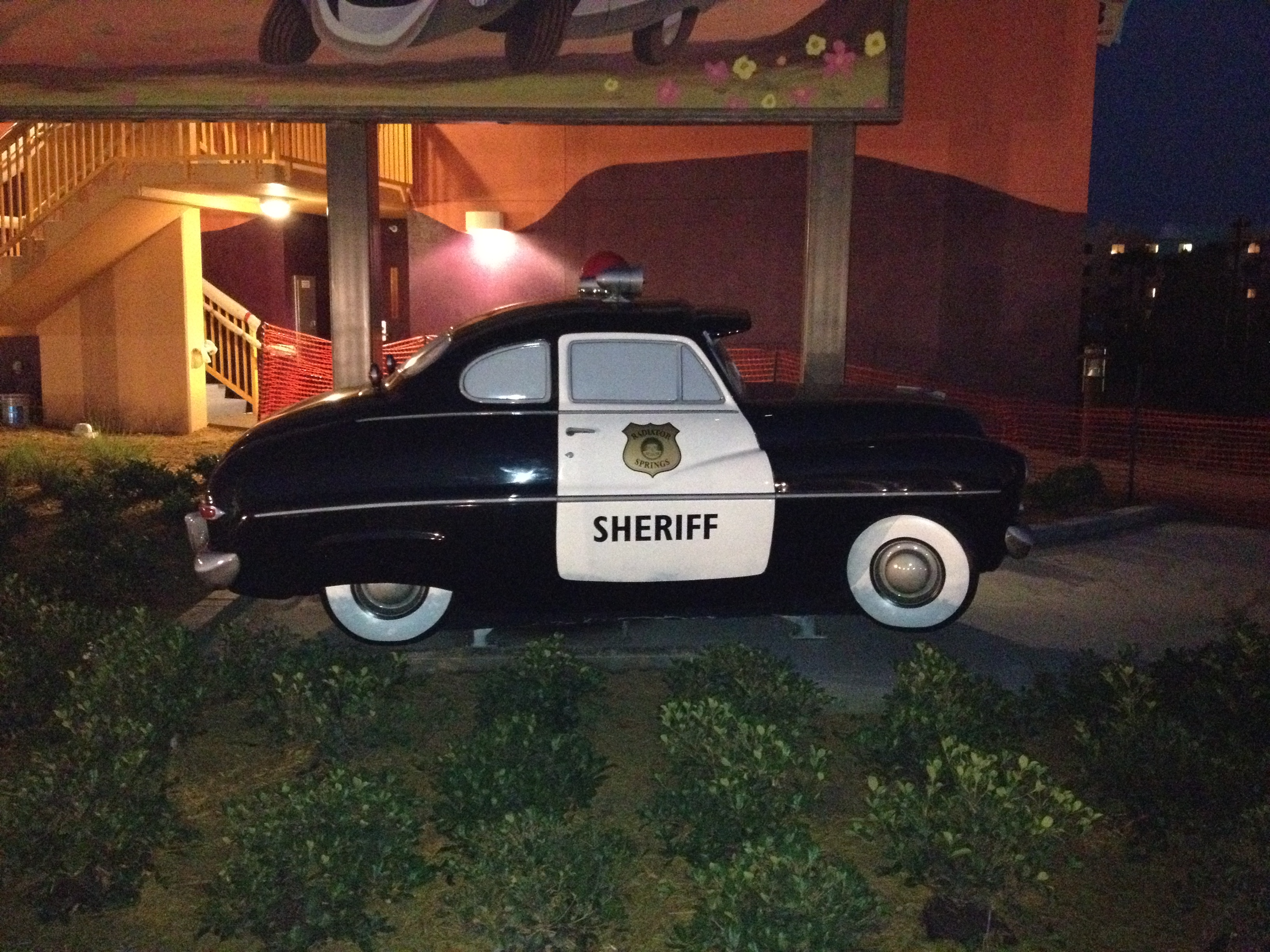
Sheriff in Disney's Art of Animation Resort

Sheriff (voiced by Michael Wallis) is a 1949 Mercury Eight police car. Sheriff is painted in classic black and white with a single red light dome, two sirens, and curb feelers. Sheriff was the first resident of Radiator Springs to appear in Cars and the first to meet Lightning during the incident that damaged a road.

Sheriff reappears in Cars 2, seeing Lightning and his race-crew off to the World Grand Prix. During the climax of the film, Sheriff arrives with the other Radiator Springs residents as new members of Lightning's pit crew in England, and is informed by Mater of the Lemons cars' plot to kill Lightning in order to turn all vehicles in the world against alternative fuel and rely on gasoline for profit. He does help in the arresting in some of the Lemons.

Sheriff returns as a supporting character in Cars 3.

=== Luigi and Guido ===
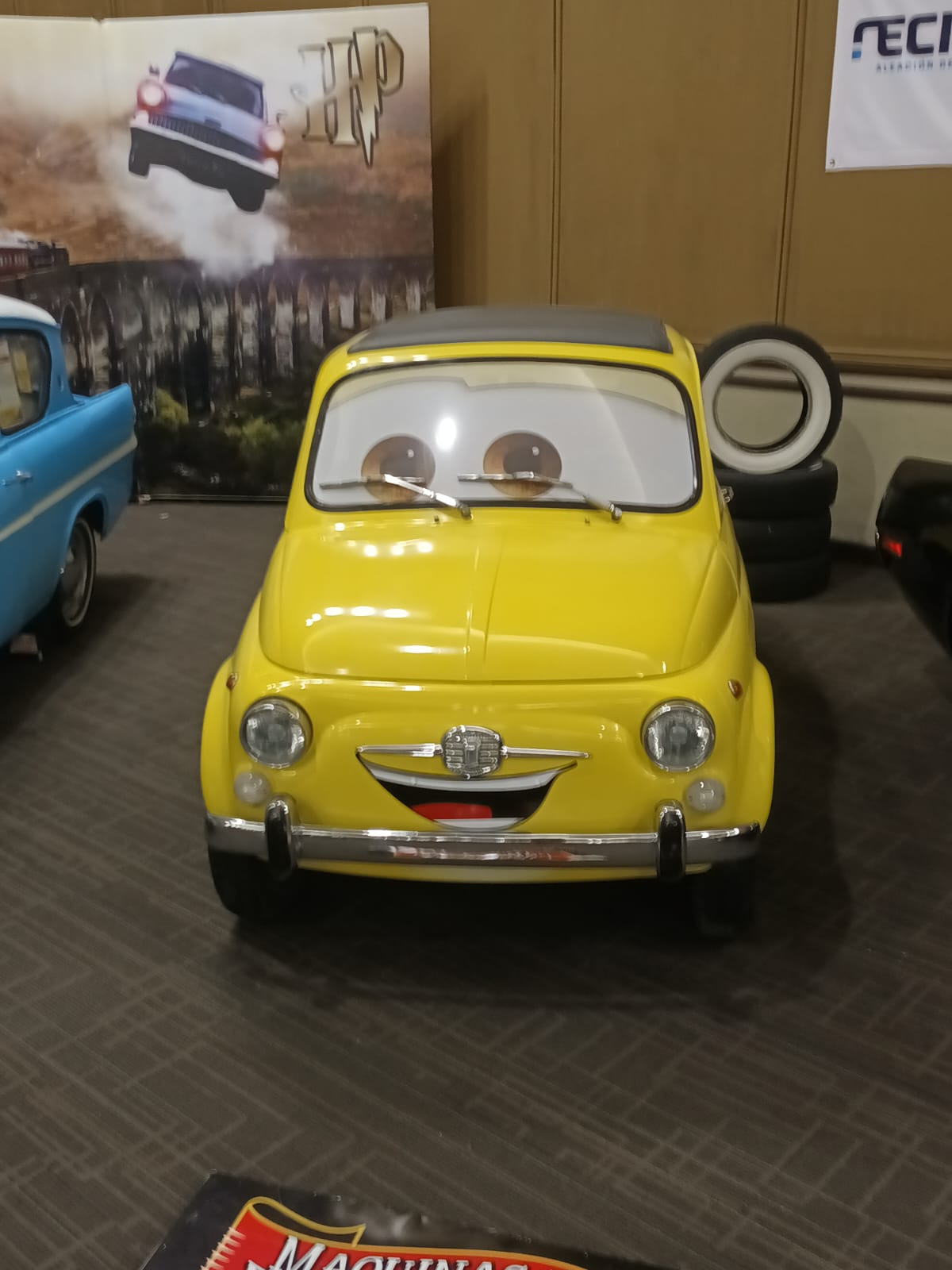
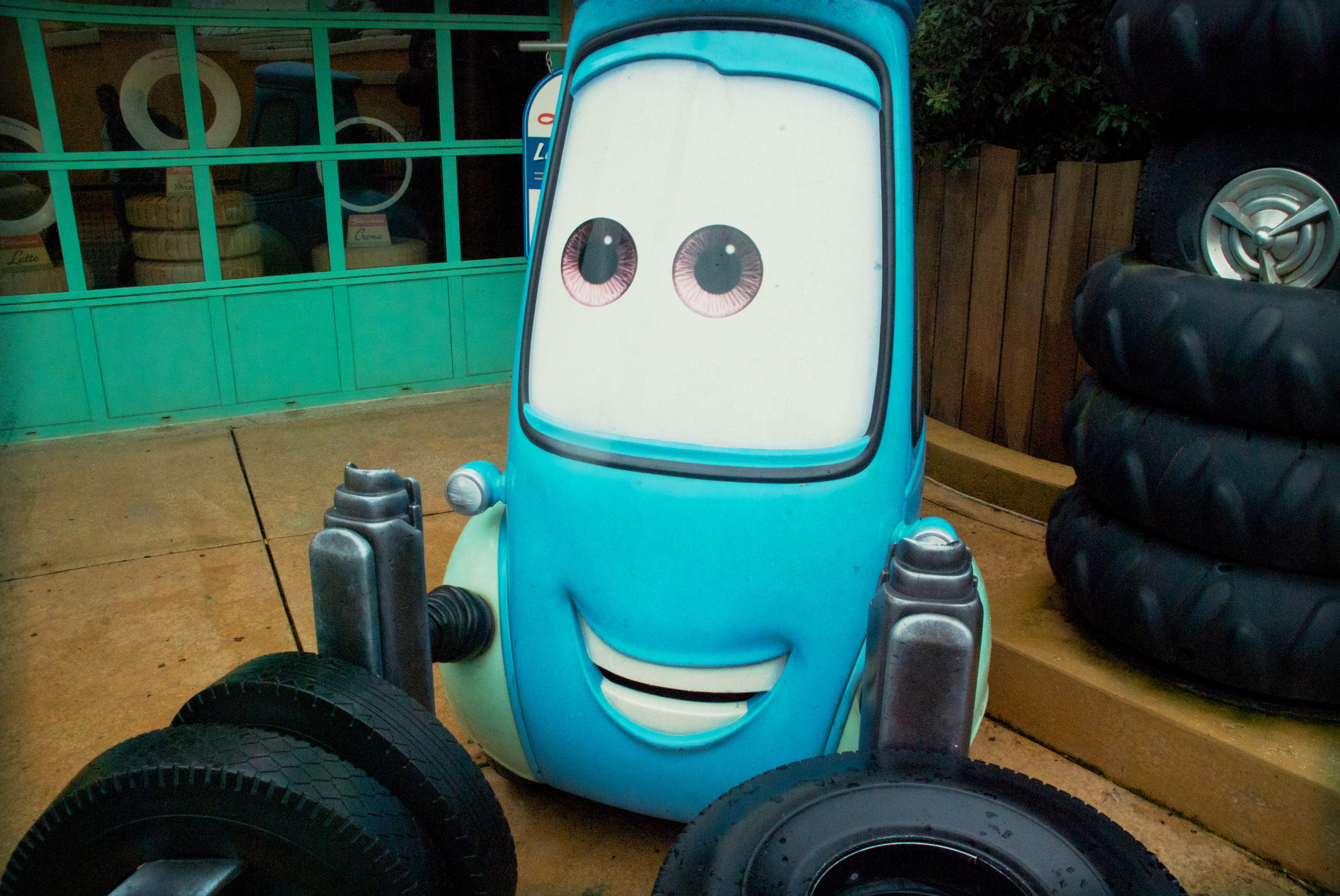
Luigi and Guido

Luigi (voiced by Tony Shalhoub in the films and video games, and Michael Shalhoub in Disney Infinity) and Guido (voiced by Guido Quaroni) are an Italian duo of cars and part of Lightning's pit crew. Luigi is a 1959 Fiat 500 who owns a tire shop called Luigi's Casa Della Tires, which is known for its "Leaning Tower of Tires", a tower of several tires shaped like the Leaning Tower of Pisa. Guido is a forklift that vaguely resembles an Isetta and Peel P50 and only speaks Italian, although his catchphrase is "pit stop" in English. Together, Luigi and Guido specialize in changing and maintaining Lightning's tires during all his races. Both are Scuderia Ferrari fans.

=== Ramone ===
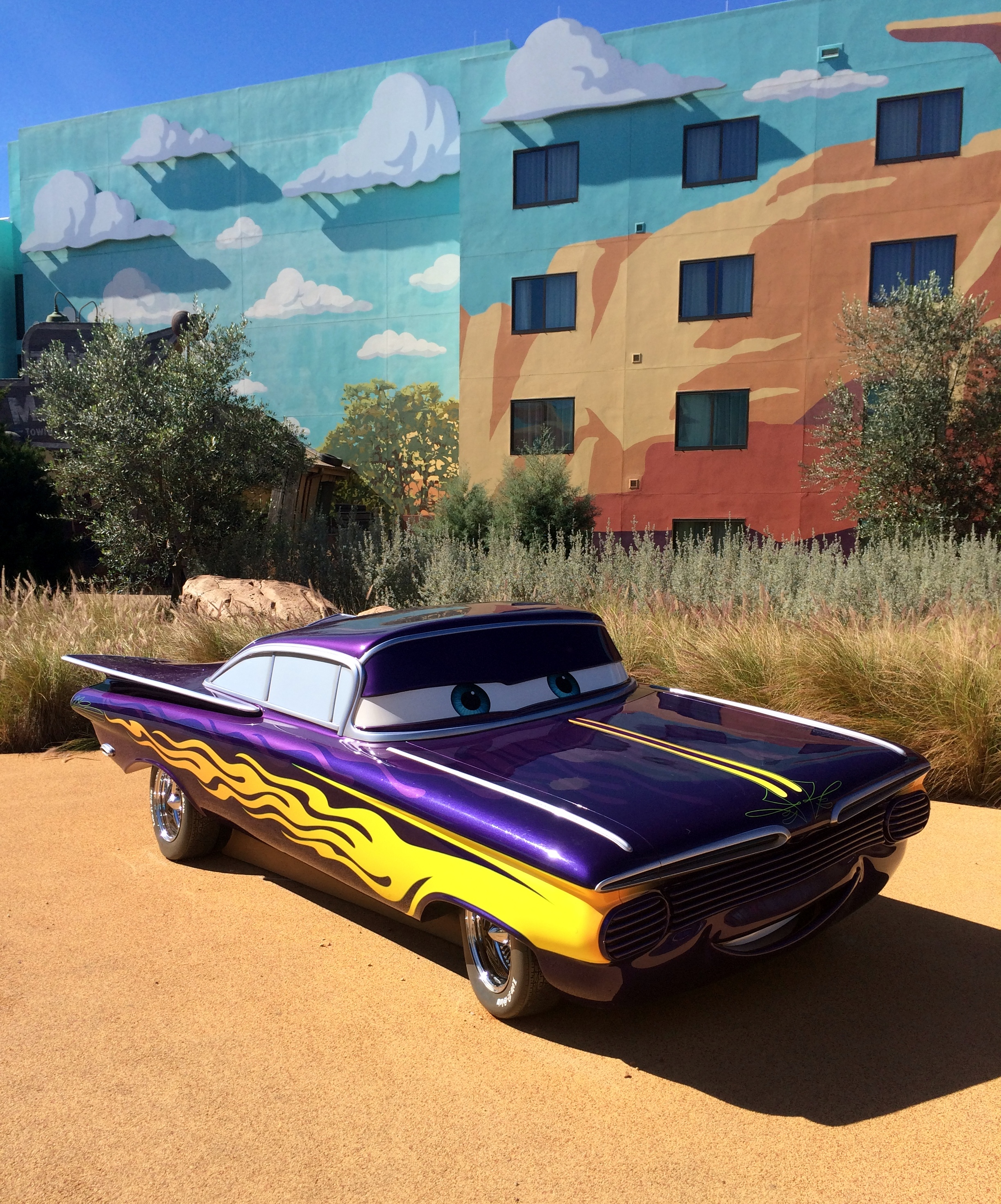
Ramone in Disney's Art of Animation Resort

Ramone (voiced by Cheech Marin in the films and video games, and Milton James in Cars 3: Driven to Win) is a 1959 Chevrolet Impala coupé lowrider who owns Ramone's House of Body Art, where he paints himself and other cars, including Lightning McQueen. He is Flo's husband. After Doc Hudson's death, Ramone took up the profession of mechanic for the residents of Radiator Springs. His garage employs the distinctive architecture of the Tower Station (U-Drop Inn) in Shamrock, Texas.

=== Flo ===
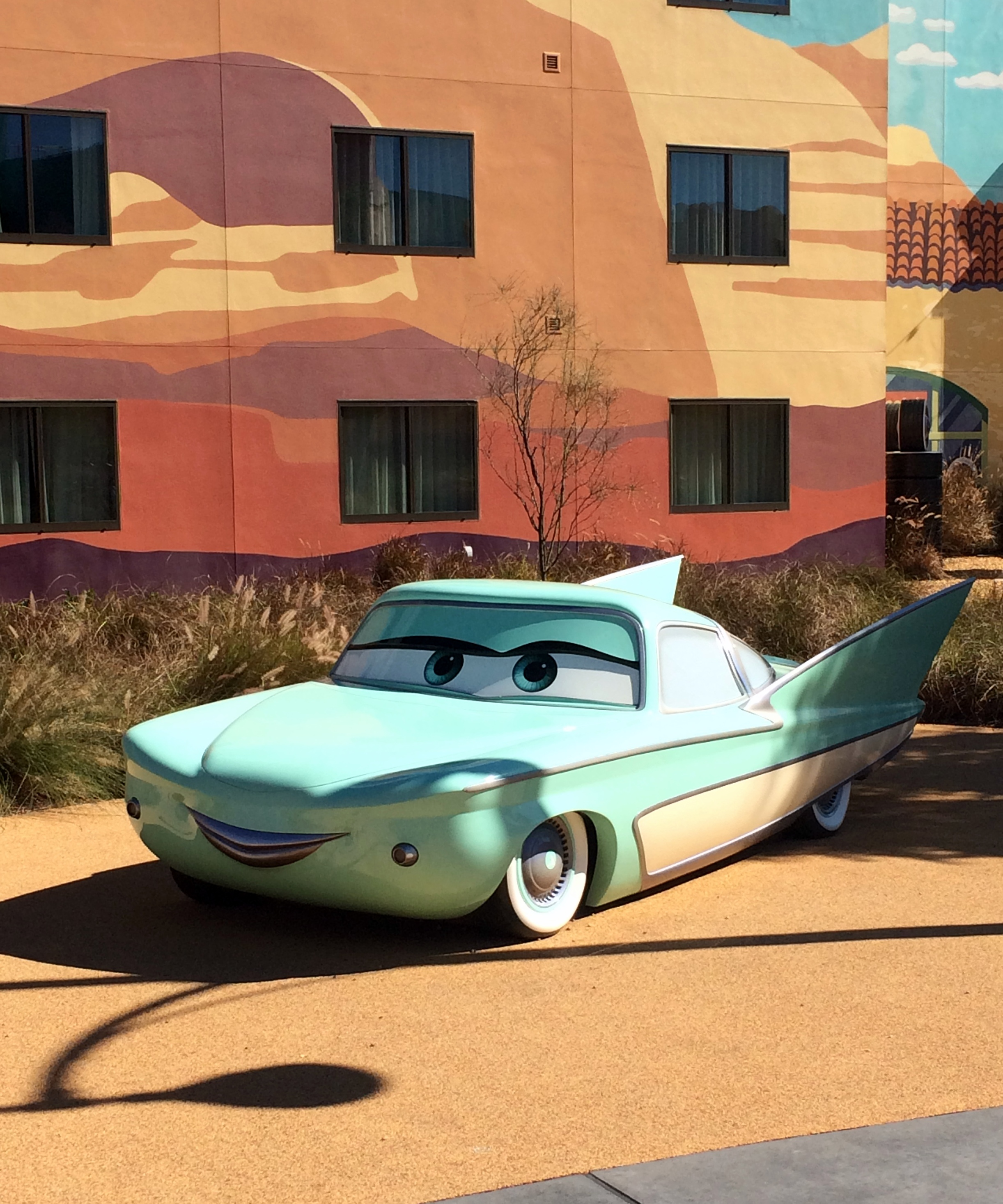
Flo in Disney's Art of Animation Resort

Flo (voiced by Jenifer Lewis) is the owner of Radiator Springs' only gas diner, "Flo's V-8 Café", and she is married to Ramone. She appears to be inspired by two early- to mid-1950s show cars: the 1951 Buick XP-300, 1951 General Motors Le Sabre, and the 1957 Chrysler Dart concept car or 1960 Chrysler 300F 2 doors hardtop custom.

=== Fillmore ===
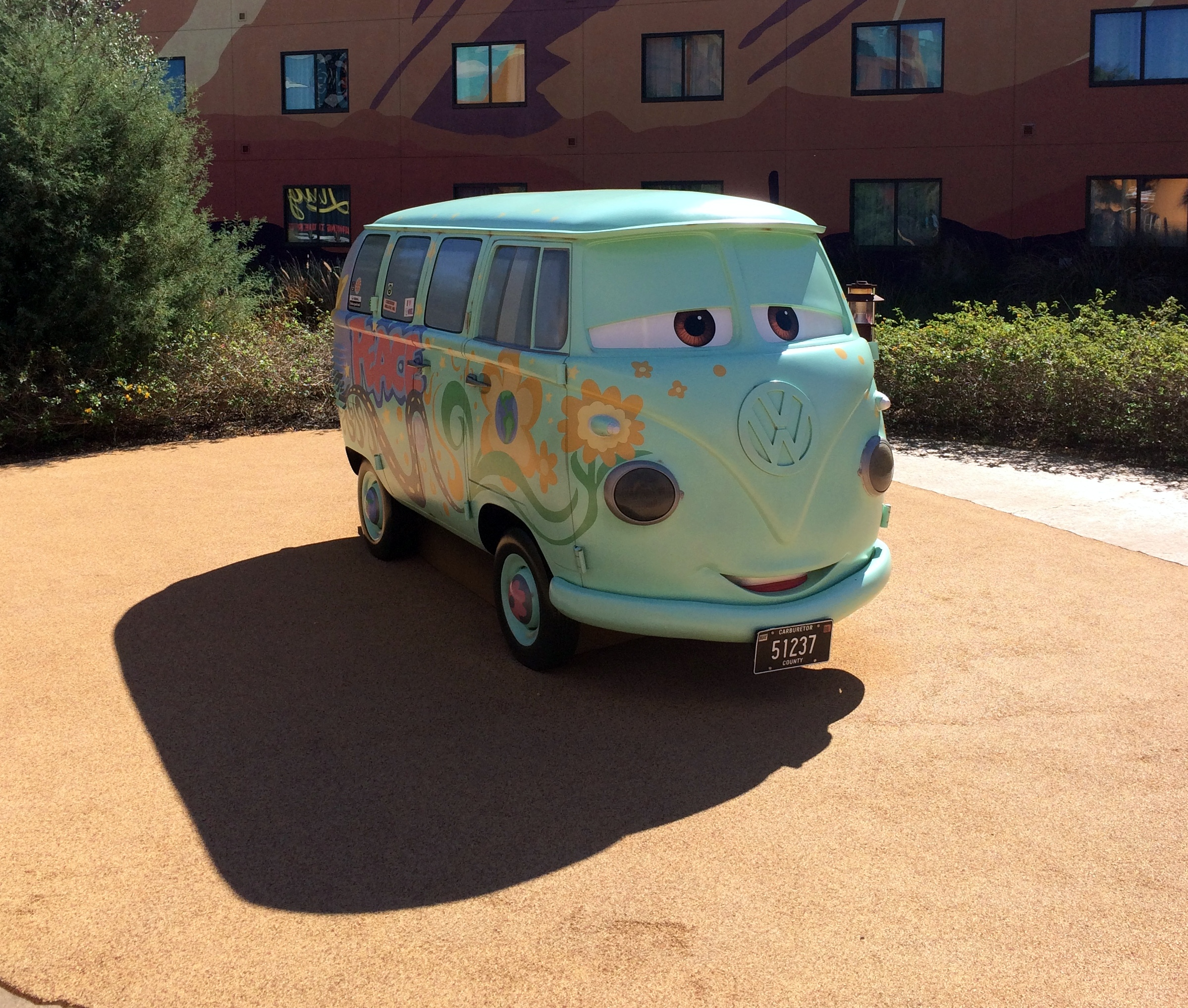
Fillmore in Disney's Art of Animation Resort

Fillmore (based on Route 66 artist Bob Waldmire and voiced by George Carlin in Cars, the video game, and Cars Toons (via archival recordings), Scott Wood in Cars Mater-National Championship, Lloyd Sherr in all other media after the first film following Carlin's death) is a green 1960 Volkswagen Type 2(T1) who owns a store that sells his own recipe of organic biofuel, which he also gives McQueen during his races. He is a stereotypical hippie, as he has numerous peace signs and flowers painted on his body as well as a front license plate that acts as a soul patch. His license plate number is '51237', a reference to Carlin's date of birth.

=== Lizzie ===
Lizzie (voiced by Katherine Helmond) is a 1923 Ford Model T Coupe, the widow of Radiator Springs' founder Stanley, and the proprietor of Lizzie's Curios. Being an elderly car, she occasionally shows the signs of dementia including her forgetting things that she said moments ago and misremembering her and other characters' names.

=== Sarge ===
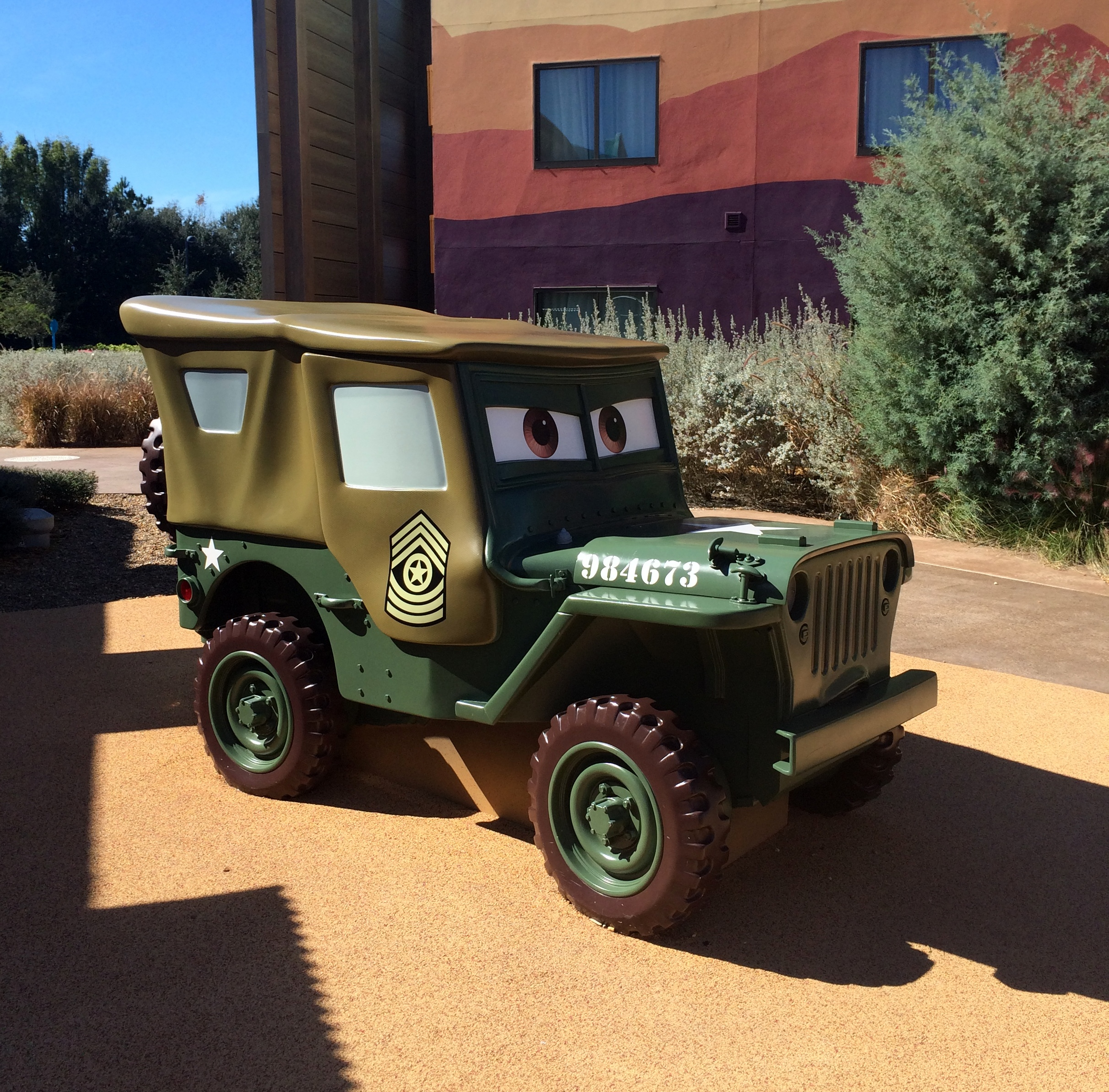
Sarge in Disney's Art of Animation Resort

Sarge (voiced by Paul Dooley) is a 1941 Willys MB Army Jeep and who fought in World War II and is the owner of Sarge's Surplus Hut. He is a member of McQueen's pit crew and serves as an analyst. Though he is annoyed with Fillmore's music, they are good friends.

=== Red ===
Red (vocalizations provided by Joe Ranft who died before the first film's release and Jerome Ranft in the third film) is Radiator Springs' resident fire truck and firefighter. He resembles a 1960 Seagrave 1000/500 D/M Pumper engine.

== Other characters introduced in Cars ==
=== Van and Minny ===
Van (voiced by Richard Kind) and Minny (voiced by Edie McClurg) are two minivans who like to travel and are minor characters in Cars. Van resembles a forest green 2005 Saturn Relay and has a luggage carrier mounted on his roof. Minny is painted violet and resembles a 1996 Chrysler Town and Country. When Van and Minny enter Radiator Springs, Van turns down Minny's suggestion to ask for directions to the interstate, believing that his GPS will lead them in the right direction. The couple later return in the post-credits scene, now lost deep within the desert and with Van almost driven to insanity.

Van and Minny appear again briefly in Cars 2 where they have visited Radiator Springs again at some point. Van does not believe Mater's retelling of his spy adventure at all until Holley Shiftwell and Finn McMissile arrive, leaving him in astonishment.

=== Mia and Tia ===
Mia (voiced by Lindsey Collins) and Tia (voiced by Elissa Knight) are twin Mazda Miata sisters and are among Lightning McQueen's biggest fans. They are painted in the same shade of red as McQueen and are covered in stickers of McQueen's likeness. The twins are in the audience during the Dinoco 400 at Motor Speedway of the South, enthusiastically cheering for McQueen. During the time McQueen goes missing, the twins change their allegiance to Chick Hicks, but immediately return to McQueen after Hicks causes Strip "The King" Weathers to crash on the final lap of the tiebreaker race.

The twins return briefly in Cars 2.

=== Jerry Recycled Batteries ===
Jerry Recycled Batteries (voiced by Joe Ranft; credited simply as Peterbilt) is a grumpy red cab-over truck whom Lightning McQueen briefly mistakes for Mack while lost on the interstate at night.

=== Frank and the Tractors ===
Frank (vocal effects provided by Steve Purcell in the first film and in Mater and the Ghostlight) is a combine harvester and the tractors (vocal effects provided by Steve Purcell) are 1939 Farmall M. They are both animals, with Frank being a bull, and the tractors cattle. The tractors getting tipped by Mater and McQueen in the field during the tractor tipping game reference cow tipping, with Frank chasing the duo afterwards.

=== Delinquent Road Hazards ===
The Delinquent Road Hazards (also called the Import Racers and the Tuners) are a group of highly-modified street-racing tuner cars that appear in the first movie. They were first seen where they cause trouble for Mack enough for him to loose Lightning. During the credits, the Delinquent Road Hazards get caught speeding by the Sheriff and are impounded by him. They are later seen doing community service by paving one of the roads using Bessie.

In Cars: The Video Game, the Delinquent Road Hazards are seen again when they race Lightning McQueen outside of Radiator Springs due them not letting anyone pass. Lightning defeated them and claimed one of their Boost Cans as the Delinquent Road Hazards vow that this isn't over. They have a level called "High Speed Heist" where they end up robbing equipment that Mack was carrying to Radiator Springs for Lightning's next race. Lightning went after the Delinquent Road Hazards in the "Lightning Strikes Back" level and defeated them while reclaiming his equipment. When they are impounded, the Delinquent Road Hazards fessed up to Lightning and the Sheriff that they were hired by Chick Hicks.

==== Boost ====
Boost (voiced by Jonas Rivera) is a 2000 Plymouth Prowler who is the leader of the Delinquent Road Hazards.

Boost appears as a DLC in Cars 2: The Video Game.

==== DJ ====
Devon Montgomery "DJ" Johnston III (voiced by E.J. Holowicki) is a 1999 Nissan Silvia S15 and a member of the Delinquent Road Hazards. He was the one who lulled Mack to sleep with his lullaby music.

DJ appears as a playable character in the PS3 and Xbox 360 versions of Cars 2: The Video Game.

==== Snot Rod ====
Snot Rod (voiced by Lou Romano) is a 2001 Subaru Impreza WRX and a member of the Delinquent Road Hazards. He is known for having chronic allergies and emit fire from his blower intakes.

Snot Rod appears as a playable character in Cars 2: The Video Game.

==== Wingo ====
Wingo (voiced by Adrian Ochoa) is a 1998 Toyota Supra MK4 and a member of the Delinquent Road Hazards. He is the body artist of the group.

Wingo appears as a DLC in Cars 2: The Video Game.

== Other characters introduced in Cars 2 ==
=== Finn McMissile ===
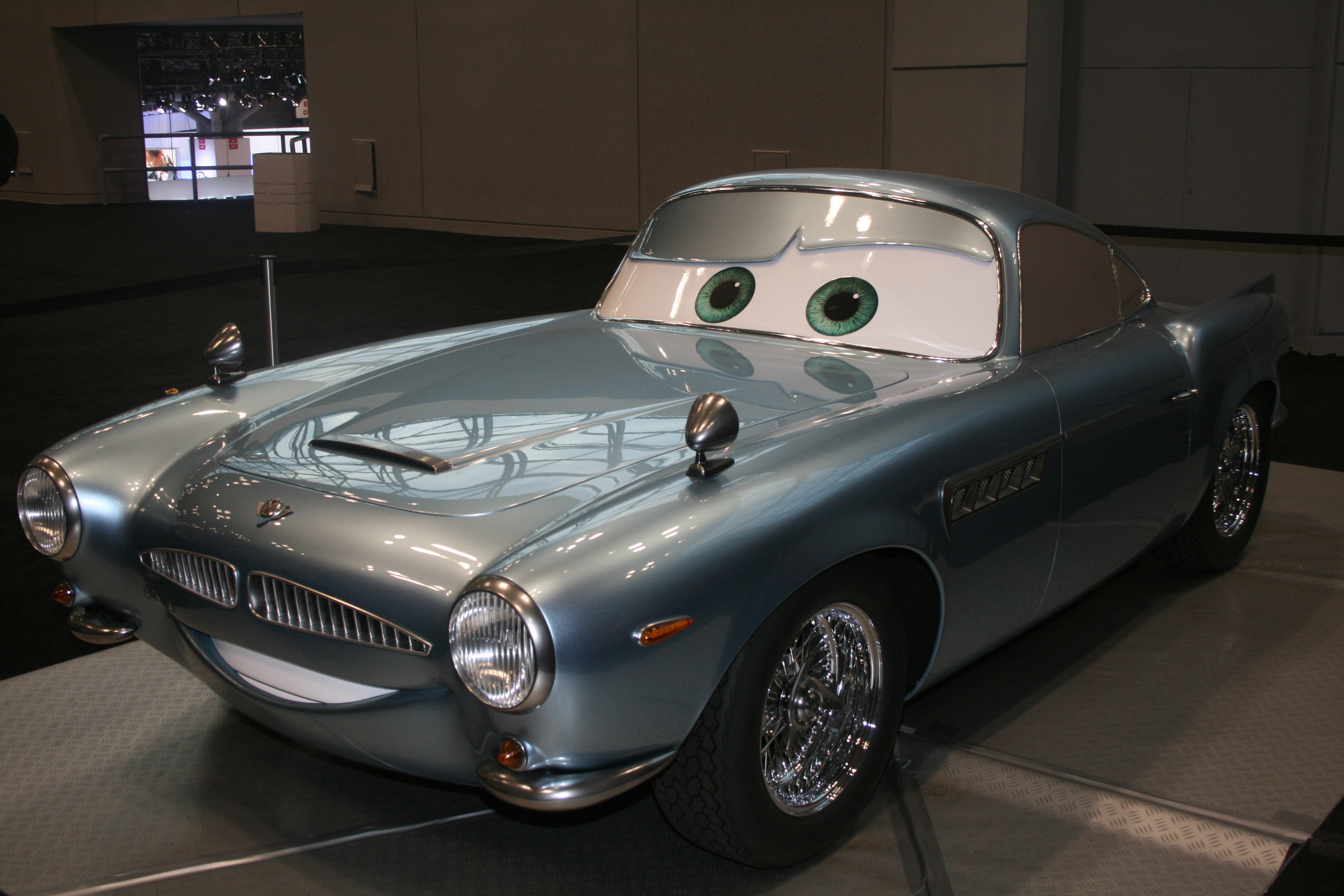
Finn McMissile

Finn McMissile (voiced by Michael Caine in the second film and Martin Jarvis in all other media) is a British secret agent working for C.H.R.O.M.E. who recruits Mater to help in his mission. He is stern yet kind. His model, a 1960s Fautless GT according to Pixar's Meet the Cars book, is a Pixar in-house design. He is based on classic European sports cars such as the Aston Martin DB5 and BMW 507, while his small tail fins were inspired by a 1958 British sports car called the Peerless—one of the few British cars with fins. Finn's suspicions about the World Grand Prix turn out to be correct, as the event was revealed to be a cover-up by Miles Axlerod to turn the world against alternative fuel.

Finn returns as a playable character in Cars 2: The Video Game.

His overall characterization is inspired by James Bond.

=== Holley Shiftwell ===
Holley Shiftwell (voiced by Emily Mortimer) is a British spy-in-training at C.H.R.O.M.E. and she is Mater's love interest. According to Pixar's Meet the Cars book, Holley's model is a Pixar in-house design known as a 2008 MT-R Mark II. Her model name appears to be in reference with a TVR sports car called the Tuscan Mark II, one of Holley's design inspirations. She bears resemblance to the 2008 RMC Scorpion, along with having a similar 3.5-liter V6 engine to this vehicle.

Holley later returned in Cars 2: The Video Game as a playable character.

=== Siddeley ===
Siddeley (voiced by Jason Isaacs) is a Gulfstream V spy jet plane that works for Finn McMissile.

His name is a reference to British aerospace and engineering group Hawker Siddeley.

=== Leland Turbo ===
Leland Turbo (voiced by Jason Isaacs) was a British spy at C.H.R.O.M.E. who infiltrated the Lemons. His vehicle model resembles a Jaguar E-Type. Before he was discovered by Grem and Acer and crushed into a cube, he sent out a warning to Finn McMissile to let them know what Professor Zündapp and the Lemons have been up to.

=== Rod Redline ===
Rod "Torque" Redline (voiced by Bruce Campbell) was an American spy who was supposed to meet up with Finn McMissile after infiltrating the Lemons. He is a blue muscle car whose design resembles the modern Dodge Challenger and Ford Mustang. Before he is taken prisoner by Grem and Acer in Tokyo, he slipped a device under Mater so that it can be retrieved by Finn McMissile and Holley Shiftwell. Professor Zündapp later killed Redline with a combination of Allinol and an electromagnetic pulse after learning that Mater has the device.

Redline returns despite his death in the film as a DLC character in Cars 2: The Video Game where he is in the simulation races.

=== Francesco Bernoulli ===
Francesco Bernoulli (voiced by John Turturro in the film and Cars 2: The Video Game and Roger Craig Smith in Kinect Rush: A Disney-Pixar Adventure and Disney Infinity) is an Italian open-wheeled race car based on the 2009 Ferrari F60 who serves as Lightning's primary racing rival in the World Grand Prix. Francesco eventually reconciles with McQueen. His racing league is based on Formula One and he is painted in the colors of the Italian flag. His surname comes from the Bernoulli-principle, an important principle in fluid dynamics.

=== Tomber ===
Tomber (voiced by Michel Michelis) is a French three-wheeled car who runs a black market auto parts dealer, and is Finn McMissile's underground informant. He is based on the Reliant Regal three-wheeler, with a few added features including the headlights of a Citroën Ami.

=== Celine Dephare ===
Celine Dephare is an old sports car resembling an Alfa Romeo Spider who works as a headlight vendor at the Marché Aux Pièces market in Paris, France. Unlike all the other characters, Celine's eyes are in her headlights and her windows are fully transparent, a reference to common cartoon depictions of anthropomorphic cars.

=== Miles Axlerod ===
Sir Miles Axlerod (voiced by Eddie Izzard) is the main antagonist of Cars 2. His design is based on the Range Rover Classic and Land Rover Defender 90, two cars famous for poor build quality. Axlerod created the World Grand Prix to promote his new alternative fuel called Allinol that turns out to be ordinary gasoline engineered to ignite when hit with an electromagnetic pulse. While he appears to the public as friendly, in truth he is the main leader of the Lemons conspiracy, and is shown to be very greedy and ruthless. He ultimately tries to kill both McQueen and Mater by placing a bomb on Mater that can only be deactivated by his own voice, but this ends up backfiring when Mater deduces he is the culprit and corners him, leading to him deactivating the bomb to avoid being killed by the explosion. This exposes him to the world and leads to his arrest. Axlerod planned to use Zündapp and the Lemons to kill McQueen in the final race, but the EMP weapon failed because Sarge had switched Lightning's Allinol for Fillmore's all-natural, sustainable, organic biofuel before the start of the race, saving Lightning's life. His engine, quoted as "the worst motor ever made" in the film, is based on the Lucas fuel-injected 3.5L Rover V8.

==== Professor Zündapp ====
Professor Otto Wolfgang Zündapp (voiced by Thomas Kretschmann), also called Professor Z, is a 1957 Zündapp Janus and an internationally wanted mad scientist. He is the secondary antagonist and subordinate to Miles Axlerod. He was responsible for the death of the captive Rod Redline. During the climactic showdown in London, he is defeated by Finn McMissile. The spies then discover that he is not the mastermind behind the Allinol incident or the one who activated the bomb on Mater. Finally, Holley tases him.

==== Grem and Acer ====
Grem (voiced by Joe Mantegna) and Acer (voiced by Peter Jacobson) are two underlings of Professor Zündapp. Grem is an orange 1975 AMC Gremlin, and Acer is a lime green 1975 AMC Pacer. Both have a very worn appearance. After roughing up Rod "Torque" Redline, the duo later guarded the captured Mater, Holley Shiftwell, and Finn McMissile in London. When Mater tried to escape from Lightning because of the bomb on his engine, Grem and Acer chased after them, only for Holley to intercept and cause them to crash into her, sending them flying into a pub called “Ye Left Turn Inn”. The crash spilled the patrons’ drinks, prompting them to retaliate and attack. Defeated by the angry crowd, a tire rolled out of Ye Left Turn Inn, leaving Grem and Acer’s fate unknown.

==== Tony Trihull ====
Tony Trihull (voiced by Lloyd Sherr) is a littoral combat ship that works for Professor Zündapp. He first appeared telling a crab boat to leave a restricted area secretly run by Zündapp and the Lemons. When Finn McMissile infiltrates the operation and escapes, Tony goes on the attack. During the London race, Tony attempts to save a fleeing Zündapp with his magnet and fires at Finn, but Finn sends explosives onto Tony’s magnet, causing an explosion that presumably kills him.

=== Brent Mustangburger ===
Brent Mustangburger is a navy-blue 1965 Ford Mustang. He represents Brent Musburger, at the time a sportscaster at ESPN and is voiced by him. Mustangburger acts as a sportscaster. He appears in Cars 2 as well as Planes.

=== Lemons ===
The Lemons are the international crime families that all appear together in Cars 2. They are all cars with a negative reputation who are in league with Sir Miles Axelrod and Professor Zündapp.

The Lemons consist of four families:

==== Pacer family ====
The Pacer family are a group of Lemons that are based on the AMC Pacer.

- Tubbs Pacer (voiced by Brad Lewis) is the leader of the Pacer family. During the climatic fight, Tubbs was hit by a paint spray by Ramone and leads some of the remaining Lemons into retreating only to run into Sarge and his Scotland Yard contacts.
- Fred Pacer is a member of the Pacer family. He fought Finn McMissile in Tokyo and was presumed deceased when he was thrown in an elevator that ascended too fast.
- Petey Pacer is a member of the Pacer family. During the pursuing of Lightning McQueen in Tokyo, Finn McMissile fired a fire extinguisher at Petey causing him to crash into a police car who proceeded to arrest him.
- Jerome Ramped is a member of the Pacer family. He was among those that fought Finn McMissile on the oil rig.

==== Gremlin family ====
The Gremlin family are a group of Lemons that are based on the AMC Gremlin.

- J. Curby Gremlin (voiced by John Mainieri) is the leader of the Gremlin family. During the climatic scene where Mater tries to reason with the Lemons, J. Curby Gremlin was not moved by Mater's speech by quoting "Yeah, but it's worth a shot". He was then sprayed by Red enough to be trapped behind a fence.
- Tyler Gremlin is a member of the Gremlin family. He was present when Professor Zündapp murdered Rod "Torque" Redline.
- Don Gremlin is a member of the Gremlin family who was only seen at the oil rig that Finn McMissile infiltrated.
- Towga Gremlin is a member of the Gremlin family who was only seen at the oil rig where he had assisted in killing Leland Turbo.
- Stefan Gremsky is a member of the Gremlin family.

==== Hugo family ====
The Hugo family are a group of Lemons that are based on the Yugo 45.

- Victor Hugo (voiced by Stanley Townsend) is the leader of the Hugo family. During the climatic scene in London, Victor was among those defeated and arrested. He cannot drive himself because Victor is evidently based on a Yugo 45 as stated before.
- Alexander Hugo is a member of the Hugo family and Victor's bodyguard.
- Ivan (voiced by Stanley Townsend) is a tow truck who works for Victor Hugo. He was responsible for capturing Holley after Mater posed as him. During the climatic scene in London, Ivan was defeated by Mater and arrested.
- Karl Haulzemoff is a 2007 Porteur Chauffeur VH who takes Victor Hugo anywhere. When Mater was captured, he was thrown into Karl.

==== Trunkov family ====
The Trunkov family are a group of Lemons that are based on the ZAZ-968.

- Vladimir Trunkov (voiced by Stanley Townsend) is the leader of the Trunkov family. When the Lemons confronted Lightning McQueen and Mater following Grem and Acer's defeat, Lightning assumes to Mater, Finn and Holley that the Lemons want him dead where Vladimir quotes "It's nothing personal". During the fight with Lightning, Mater, Finn McMissile, Holley Shiftwell, and those from Radiator Springs, Flo shines a reflection into Vladimir's eyes temporarily blinding him enabling Sheriff to place a car boot on him.
- Petrov Trunkov is a member of the Trunkov family who was seen on the oil rig.
- Tolga Trunkov is a black Trunkov and a member of the Trunkov family. During the climatic fight in London, Holley Shiftwell sent him and another Trunkov flying into some Pacers.

=== World Grand Prix racers ===
==== Jeff Gorvette ====
Jeff Gorvette is a Chevrolet Corvette C6.R. He is voiced in a guest role by Jeff Gordon. Gorvette is bright yellow with the American flag painted on his sides. He is described to be an accomplished racer and a close friend of McQueen's. When McQueen meets Jeff at the Tokyo party in Cars 2, he greets him warmly. Gorvette later appears briefly before the start of the Florida 500 in Cars 3. While being interviewed, Gorvette spots McQueen drive by and tells him to "win one for us old guys", implying that Gorvette may have retired.

==== Lewis Hamilton ====
Lewis Hamilton is a half British half Grenadian endurance race car resembling a McLaren 12C. He is voiced by himself Formula One or World Champion, Lewis Hamilton. He is described as a "Three-time Grand Touring Sport Champion" in Cars: Under The Hood. During the party in Tokyo, Lewis can be seen with Gorvette and calls McQueen over to them. He later manages to stop before a massive crash during the second stage of the World Grand Prix in Italy along with Jeff Gorvette.

==== Shu Todoroki ====
Shu Todoroki is a Japanese Le Mans Prototype. He is painted with a white-and-red design on his body after the National Flag of Japan.

==== Carla Veloso ====
Carla Veloso is a Brazilian Le Mans Prototype race car. Jay Shuster, Cars 2's Character Art Director, stated in a fan Q&A that she is inspired after many LMP racing cars, some of which she confirmed to be the Audi R10 TDi and Audi R15 TDi. She is painted with green and blue designs on her body, representing the colors of the Brazilian flag.

==== Raoul ÇaRoule ====
Raoul ÇaRoule is a famous French rally car based on Sébastien Loeb's 2007 Citroën C4 WRC. He is described as a great rally racer in France, and is painted in the colors of the French flag with the letters "GRC" (Grand Rally Cross) on him.

==== Nigel Gearsley ====
Nigel Gearsley is a British green-liveried Aston Martin DBR9 who is named after Sir Nigel Gresley.

==== Miguel Camino ====
Miguel Camino is a Spanish endurance car who is inspired by the Chevrolet Corvette C6.R, the Nissan GT-R and various American muscle cars. His name is a pun on the Chevrolet El Camino.

==== Max Schnell ====
Max Schnell is a German touring car who is inspired by the modified Mercedes-Benz AMG C-Class DTM (W204) racer. He is voiced by 4-time Formula One world champion, Sebastian Vettel in the german dub of Cars 2 where he meets Lightning at the Tokyo Party, whilst his name was changed to Sebastian Schnell.

==== Rip Clutchgoneski ====
Rip Clutchgoneski is an open-wheeled race car who is inspired by the Caparo T1, Hulme F1 and IndyCar models. He represents the fictional country of New Rearendia because Pixar planned for him to get killed by the lemons' electromagnetic pulse emitter during one of the World Grand Prix races in Cars 2 and did not wish to offend any countries, but Pixar changed his fate to just suffer a blown engine.

== Other characters introduced in Cars 3 ==
=== Miss Fritter ===
Miss Fritter (voiced by Lea DeLaria) is a 1967 International Harvester Loadstar school bus modified for demolition derby racing and a minor antagonist in Cars 3. Miss Fritter appears in the Crazy Eight demolition derby at the Thunder Hollow Speedway and nearly saws Cruz with her stop sign blades until Lightning stops her, only to get his tire shredded. Cruz Ramirez ends up winning the race.

Miss Fritter later appeared in the Cars 3 short film "Miss Fritter's Racing Skoool" shooting a commercial for demolition derby racing along with her friends from Thunder Hollow.

She returned in Cars 3: Driven to Win as a boss and playable character.

=== Smokey ===
Smokey (voiced by Chris Cooper) is a 1947 Hudson Super Six pickup truck who owns Smokey's Garage in a fictionalized version of Thomasville, Georgia, and was Doc Hudson's mentor and crew chief. After heeding to Mater's advice, Lightning reunites with Cruz and heads to the abandoned Thomasville Speedway where they suddenly meet Smokey on the track. With help from Doc Hudson's old friends, River Scott, Junior "Midnight" Moon, and Louise "Barnstormer" Nash, Smokey uses old-school racing tactics to help Lightning train and prepare to compete against Storm and later serves as his crew chief in the Florida 500. Smokey visits Radiator Springs in the epilogue and later attends the reopening of Thomasville Speedway. He is based on Smokey Yunick.

=== Natalie Certain ===
Natalie Certain (voiced by Kerry Washington) is a statistical analyst who works for RSN and also appears with Chick Hicks on Chick's Picks. She is a maroon 4-door sedan that resembles a Tesla Model S. Certain first appears on Chick's Picks and gives a detailed explanation why Jackson Storm and the other Next-Gen racers have better performance than the previous generation of racers. When McQueen tunes into Chick's Picks after Thunder Hollow, Certain makes the prediction that McQueen only has a 1.2 percent chance of beating Storm in the Florida 500. Certain appears again in the commentator booth with Bob Cutlass and Darrell Cartrip after Cruz wins the Florida 500.

Certain returns as a playable character in Cars 3: Driven to Win.

=== Cal Weathers ===
Cal Weathers (voiced by Kyle Petty) is a sky blue stock car (presumably a 2006 Dodge Intrepid NASCAR) who raced for Dinoco and was one of Lightning McQueen's friends in the Piston Cup along with Brick Yardley and Bobby Swift. He is Strip "The King" Weathers' nephew. Cal's average racing performance often prompted Tex Dinoco to joke about replacing him with Lightning on team Dinoco.

=== Brick Yardley ===
Brick Yardley (voiced by Will Collyer in Cars 3, Ben Rausch in Cars 3: Driven to Win) is a lime-green stock car who raced for Vitoline, and is one of Lightning McQueen's old friends in the Piston Cup, with the racing number 24. Yardley raced in the Piston Cup for 9 years and was able to beat Lightning McQueen a few times before being replaced by the Next-Gen racer Chase Racelott. Yardley's name is a reference to the "Brickyard", a nickname for the Indianapolis Motor Speedway.

=== Bobby Swift ===
Bobby Swift (voiced by Angel Oquendo in Cars 3, Teddy Spencer in Cars 3: Driven to Win) is a purple stock car who raced for Octane Gain, and is one of Lightning McQueen's old racing friends. He raced in the Piston Cup for 8 years until he either retired or was replaced by Daniel Swervez after the takeover of Jackson Storm and the Next Generation racers. Swift often competed wheel-to-wheel with Lightning McQueen and Cal Weathers, and was known for making unexpected passes to win a race at the last moment. His racing number was 19.

=== River Scott ===
River Scott (voiced by Isiah Whitlock Jr.) is a 1948 stock car from the fictional brand Dirt Track Racer (based on a 1933 Willys 77) who raced during the early days of the Piston Cup, and was one of Doc Hudson's friends. Scott was known for his aggressive racing style and still keeps a few dents as souvenirs.

=== Junior Moon ===
Junior "Midnight" Moon (voiced by Junior Johnson) is a 1940 Ford Standard Coupe who raced in the Piston Cup and was friends with Doc Hudson. Junior is said to have pioneered the drafting technique in stock car racing.

=== Louise Nash ===
Louise "Barnstormer" Nash (voiced by Margo Martindale) is a 1950 Nash Ambassador who raced in the Piston Cup with Doc Hudson. Known as the "First Lady of Racing", Nash was the first female car who raced in the Piston Cup and had to steal a racing number, 94, in order to compete. According to River Scott, Nash had "serious eyes" for Doc Hudson at one point, although Nash said Hudson simply didn't like fast women which left her out.

=== Leroy Heming ===
Leroy Heming is a 1950s Chrysler C300 who raced in the Piston Cup. Leroy entered the Piston Cup as a rookie and was one of the fastest new cars at the time. His surname is a reference to the Hemi line of engines found in Chrysler vehicles. During McQueen and Cruz's time in Thomasville, Smokey told the story to them of how Leroy once tried to challenge Doc Hudson during a race at Thomasville Speedway by ramming him into the wall. Hudson managed to evade Leroy spectacularly on the final lap and won, stunning Leroy and earning his respect in the process.

== Introduced in Planes ==
=== Dusty Crophopper ===
Dusty Crophopper (voiced by Dane Cook) was inspired by the Air Tractor AT-502, Cessna and the PZL-Mielec M-18 Dromader. He is painted white and orange with some black stripes and a "D7" on his rudder. After his training, he has the black Jolly Wrenches insignia Skipper earned him up front. Since the Germany leg in the WATG rally, he gained blue stripes and the number 7 in a white circle on his body and wings. After severely crashing en route to Mexico in the storm, most Wings Around The Globe racers gave him new parts as well as gaining T-33 Shooting Star wings and a Skyslicer MK 5 propeller. At the end of the film, he has a Jolly Wrenches paint job while heading back to Propwash Junction with Skipper, having been made an honorary Jolly Wrench.

=== Skipper Riley ===
Skipper Riley (voiced by Stacy Keach) is a Vought F4U Corsair and Dusty's mentor. His sole mission was a routine patrol that turned disastrous when his squadron stumbled upon an enemy fleet, leaving him as the sole survivor.

=== Sparky ===
Sparky (voiced by Danny Mann) is a grey forklift and good friend of Chug and Skipper's assistant and mechanic.

=== Ishani ===
Ishani (voiced by Priyanka Chopra) is a Pan-Asian champion from India, based on the AeroCad AeroCanard with over a billion racing fans. She is painted orange, yellow, and red with the number 6 in green. She is Dusty's love interest and Ripslinger's hated rival and former ally and teammate.

=== Chug ===
Chug (voiced by Brad Garrett) is a green fuel truck and Dusty's best friend. He sometimes uses his binoculars to look for Dusty, but he decided to drive towards him.

=== Dottie ===
Dottie (voiced by Teri Hatcher) is a blue forklift. She is Dusty and Chug’s best friends with ever since. Before she tries to fix Dusty’s machines, she has her idea because she wants Chug to help her and the two start arguing and Dusty is trying to fly without his engines are not working.

=== Leadbottom ===
Leadbottom (voiced by Cedric the Entertainer) is a biplane inspired by the Boeing-Stearman Model 75 with a partial engine cowl.

=== Rochelle ===
Rochelle (voiced by Julia Louis-Dreyfus) is a racing plane from Canada inspired by the Bay Super V, a conversion of the V-tail Model 35 Beechcraft Bonanza painted pink and white with some red maple leaf designs and her number is 22 in white. Originally from Quebec, her flag and paint job is localized in 11 countries. She is also El Chupacabra's girlfriend. In Australia and New Zealand, Rochelle is re-contextualized as a former Tasmanian mail delivery plane, and is voiced by Jessica Marais.

=== Bulldog ===
Bulldog (voiced by John Cleese) is a red, white and blue de Havilland DH.88 Comet and British racing champion with the number 11 as his race number. He befriended Dusty after he saved him from an oil spill during the Iceland-Germany leg.

=== Ripslinger ===
Ripslinger (voiced by Roger Craig Smith) is a custom-built carbon-fiber race plane with green and black decals, orange flame designs, several racing sponsors and his name painted on his body and wings. He also has a four bladed contra-rotating propeller. Rip is captain of Team RPX and Dusty's hated rival in the film. His race number is 13. He later damaged Skipper's vertical stabilizer during the Mexico-New York leg. He returned as a main antagonist for Planes: the Video Game attempting to ruin Dusty's fame, wreck his town, paint Dusty graffiti on the Great Wall of China while disguised as him, and even cause trouble for Dusty's international friends including ruining the Diwali Festival in Ishani's home country.

==== Ned and Zed ====
Ned and Zed (both voiced by Gabriel Iglesias) are the sidekicks of Ripslinger and his teammates inspired by the Zivko Edge 540 and MX Aircraft MXS. Ned is painted green with some white wings and the number 0 in orange, and Zed is painted white with some green wings and the number 00 also in orange. They are twin brothers that were born in New Zealand who try to sabotage the other racers by flying aggressively, allowing Ripslinger to take the win with Ned and Zed finishing second and third. They were later thwarted by Dusty when Ned hit a rock on his left wing, sending him into a barrel roll and trapping both him and Zed into a narrow gap that only Dusty was able to fly through.

=== El Chupacabra ===
El Chupacabra (voiced by Carlos Alazraqui) is a Mexican red, white and green Gee Bee Model R with the number 5 in red. He is Dusty's good friend and Rochelle's love interest.

=== Echo ===
Echo (voiced by Anthony Edwards) is a Boeing F/A-18E Super Hornet from the Jolly Wrenches who he and Bravo rescued Dusty and guided him to land on the USS Dwight D. Flysenhower aircraft carrier.

=== Bravo ===
Bravo (voiced by Val Kilmer) is another Boeing F/A-18E Super Hornet from the Jolly Wrenches who he and Echo rescued Dusty and guided him to land on the USS Dwight D. Flysenhower aircraft carrier.

=== Franz Flieghosen ===
Franz is a German Aerocar that has a split personality. Franz can turn into a plane when he puts on his wings.

== Introduced in Planes: Fire & Rescue ==
=== Lil' Dipper ===
Lil' Dipper (voiced by Julie Bowen) is a Super Scooper based on the Grumman G-21 Goose and C-415 SuperScooper She is also Dusty's biggest fan and has a crush on him.

=== Maru ===
Maru (voiced by Curtis Armstrong) is a forklift mechanic at the Piston Peak Air Attack base. He is known to make old things, "Better then new".

=== Blade Ranger ===
Blade Ranger (voiced by Ed Harris) is a veteran fire-and-rescue helicopter. He formerly starred in CHoPs with Nick "Loop'n" Lopez, and became a firefighter after Nick's death. He is the chief and leader of the Piston Peak Air Attack team. Blade is inspired by the AgustaWestland AW109, AgustaWestland AW139. and Bell 429 GlobalRanger. Blade's character on CHoPs is based on Captain Jonathan Andrew Baker.

=== Windlifter ===
Windlifter (voiced by Wes Studi) is a Sikorsky S-64 Skycrane tall heavy-lifter helicopter who used to work as a lumberjack like Paul Bunyan before Planes Fire & Rescue. He is the second-in-command of the Piston Peak Air Attack team.

=== Cabbie ===
Cabbie (voiced by Dale Dye) is a Fairchild C-119 Flying Boxcar retired from military service who airdrops the Smokejumpers to fire sites.

=== Dynamite ===
Dynamite (voiced by Regina King) is the leader of The Smokejumpers, a team of ground vehicles which parachute into fire sites.

=== Pinecone ===
Pinecone (voiced by Corri English) is a smokejumper equipped with a rake tool to clear brush and debris.

=== Avalanche ===
Avalanche (voiced by Bryan Callen) is a bulldozer and a smokejumper.

=== Blackout ===
Blackout (voiced by Danny Pardo) is a smokejumper equipped with a circular saw.

=== Drip ===
Drip (voiced by Matt L. Jones) is a smokejumper equipped with a skid-steer claw to clear fallen trees and brush.

=== Cad Spinner ===
Cad Spinner (voiced by John Michael Higgins) is based on a 2007-2014 Cadillac Escalade. His main goal in the film was the reopening of a lodge at Piston Peak National Park and its safety. This led to him knowingly endanger the rest of the valley during a large forest fire. After Dusty helped to put out the forest fire, Cad Spinner was reassigned to park ranger work at Death Valley National Park as a punishment and as seen in the mid-credits scene.

=== Secretary of the Interior ===
Secretary of the Interior (voiced by Fred Willard) is a green four-wheel-drive with a roof rack. He Is based on a 1966 Ford Bronco

=== Harvey and Winnie ===
Harvey (voiced by Jerry Stiller) and Winnie (voiced by Anne Meara) are the two RVs who are married. They are based on a Winnebago Brave.

=== Nick Lopez ===
Nick "Loop'n" Lopez (voiced by Erik Estrada) is a helicopter TV actor who was the co-star of CHoPs. He was killed during filming of the series' one-hundred-thirty-ninth episode. Nick is based on Estrada's character Officer Francis Poncherello.

=== Ol' Jammer ===
Ol' Jammer (voiced by Barry Corbin) is a 1936 White Model 706 tour bus at Piston Peak. He later was promoted as superintendent after Cad was fired.

=== Mayday ===
Mayday (voiced by Hal Holbrook) is an old fire and rescue truck from Propwash Junction.

=== Ryker ===
Ryker (voiced by Kevin Michael Richardson) is an Oshkosh Striker 3000 transportation management safety truck with a roof-mounted water cannon for firefighting.

=== Pulaski ===
Pulaski (voiced by Patrick Warburton) is a structural firefighting fire truck at Piston Peak with a roof-mounted water cannon for firefighting. Pulaski's namesake, Ed Pulaski, was known for his heroism in saving most of his crew during the Great Fire of 1910 by sheltering in an abandoned mine.
