= Cars 3 =

2017 film by Brian Fee

- Theatrical release poster
- Directed by: Brian Fee
- Screenplay by: Kiel Murray; Bob Peterson; Mike Rich
- Story by: Brian Fee; Ben Queen; Eyal Podell; Jonathan E. Stewart
- Produced by: Kevin Reher
- Starring: Owen Wilson; Cristela Alonzo; Chris Cooper; Nathan Fillion; Larry the Cable Guy; Armie Hammer
- Cinematography: Jeremy Lasky (camera); Kim White (lighting)
- Edited by: Jason Hudak
- Music by: Randy Newman
- Production company: Pixar Animation Studios
- Distributed by: Walt Disney Studios; Motion Pictures (Note: Distributed under the Walt Disney Pictures banner.)
- Release dates: May 23, 2017 (Kannapolis); June 16, 2017 (United States)
- Running time: 102 minutes
- Country: United States
- Language: English
- Budget: $175 million
- Box office: $383.9 million

Cars 3 is a 2017 American animated sports comedy film directed by Brian Fee and written by Kiel Murray, Bob Peterson, and Mike Rich. Produced by Pixar Animation Studios for Walt Disney Pictures, it is the third film in the Cars franchise, and the sequel to Cars 2 (2011). Owen Wilson, Larry the Cable Guy, Bonnie Hunt, Tony Shalhoub, Guido Quaroni, Cheech Marin, Jenifer Lewis, Paul Dooley, Lloyd Sherr, Michael Wallis, Katherine Helmond and John Ratzenberger reprise their roles from previous films, with Cristela Alonzo, Chris Cooper, Armie Hammer, Nathan Fillion, Lea DeLaria and Kerry Washington joining the cast. In the film, Lightning McQueen (Wilson), now a veteran race car and racing legend, must prove that he is still competitive against the next generation of technologically advanced racers, with the help of young technician Cruz Ramirez (Alonzo), to prevent a forced retirement from the Piston Cup against his new racing rival Jackson Storm (Hammer).

Development of a third Cars film began in late 2011 after the release of its predecessor, and entered production in 2014, with Pixar's then-CCO John Lasseter stating that it would be a "very emotional story", and go back to the first film's themes. The production team for the film conducted research on multiple NASCAR racers, particularly older ones, as well as a sports psychoanalyst, while also focusing on McQueen's relationship with Doc Hudson and its meaning. The production utilized a new rendering system, Rix Integration Subsystem (RIS), which was previously used in Finding Dory (2016). New cast members including Hammer and Alonzo were announced in January 2017, followed by Fillion, Washington and DeLaria two months later. Randy Newman, who had worked on the first film, composed the film's score with artists such as Andra Day, James Bay, Brad Paisley and Jorge Blanco contributing tracks for the film.

Cars 3 was first screened for the NASCAR industry in Kannapolis, North Carolina on May 23, 2017, before its theatrical release in the United States on June 16, accompanied by the animated short film Lou. The film received generally positive reviews from critics and grossed $383 million worldwide against its $175 million budget, becoming the lowest-grossing film of the franchise.

== Plot ==
Lightning McQueen, now a seven-time Piston Cup champion, finds himself overshadowed by Jackson Storm, an arrogant rookie who is the first among a new generation of race cars with advanced technology to enhance performance. As Storm wins throughout the season, many racing veterans retire or are replaced by younger and faster rookies. In the final race at Los Angeles, McQueen briefly leads but falls behind after being overtaken by Storm and other rookies. He struggles to keep up, loses control, and has a massive rollover crash after hitting the wall and blowing over, prematurely ending his worst season on record as Storm wins the Piston Cup.

Four months later, McQueen, who has since recovered from his crash, decides that he will continue racing and calls his sponsors, Rusty and Dusty, who reveal they have sold Rust-eze to a wealthy business car named Sterling. Sterling assigns McQueen to train at the Rust-eze Racing Center under Cruz Ramirez, where he struggles to adapt to the modern training methods. After McQueen accidentally damages a simulator, Sterling tries to force him to retire. Adamant that he can still race, McQueen offers that if he wins the upcoming Florida 500, he can decide if he wants to keep racing; otherwise, he will retire immediately. Sterling reluctantly accepts the deal, but on the condition that he must train with Cruz.

Cruz's unconventional training methods and lack of real-world racing experience frustrate McQueen as they attempt to record his top speed at Fireball Beach. When Lightning decides to train at Thunder Hollow, they realize it is being used for a figure-8-style demolition derby called the "Crazy Eight" and are forced to participate in disguise, in which Cruz wins and accidentally reveals him to the public. McQueen angrily yells at Cruz after the demolition derby and accidentally breaks her trophy. Cruz reveals that she had always wanted to be a racer thanks to McQueen but was never confident enough to enter a race. Cruz decides to resign as McQueen's trainer and return to the racing center, leaving McQueen feeling ashamed. Later that night, McQueen calls his best friend Mater for advice, who suggests that McQueen track down Doc Hudson's former mentor and crew chief Smokey in his hometown of Thomasville, Georgia.

The next day, McQueen catches up to Cruz, apologizes for his actions and convinces her to rejoin him. In Thomasville, they meet up with Smokey, who reveals that, even though Doc never raced again, he found new happiness in training McQueen. (Note: As depicted in Cars (2006)) After McQueen accepts that he will never be as fast as Storm, Smokey and Doc's old friends, Louise "Barnstormer" Nash, River Scott, and Junior "Midnight" Moon, help him learn new tricks to overcome his speed disadvantage, with Cruz serving as his sparring partner. After many attempts, McQueen finally manages to pass Cruz during the final practice race. However, Cruz suddenly overtakes McQueen, which causes him to remember being passed by Storm before his crash, shaking his confidence.

At the Florida 500, McQueen starts at the back but moves up the ranks with Smokey's help. Sterling doubts McQueen's capability and orders Cruz back to the racing center, despite her desire to stay. Hearing them on his radio and recalling Cruz's racing dream, McQueen sidesteps a huge pile-up and has his crew prepare Cruz to race in his place, giving her a chance to succeed. Though initially hesitant, Cruz starts overtaking opponents with McQueen's coaching. She ends up behind Storm, who threatens her by ramming her against the wall on the final lap. Using an old move from Doc, Cruz flips over Storm, overtakes him, and wins the race.

As Cruz celebrates her victory, Sterling offers her a role on his team, but she instead takes a counteroffer from Dinoco's owner Tex Dinoco. Since McQueen and Cruz were both wearing #95, McQueen becomes the joint-winner of the race and effectively passes his deal with Sterling. Returning to Radiator Springs, McQueen reveals that Tex has bought Rust-eze from Sterling. Now wearing a livery inspired by Doc in his honor, McQueen decides to continue racing after further training Cruz.

== Voice cast ==
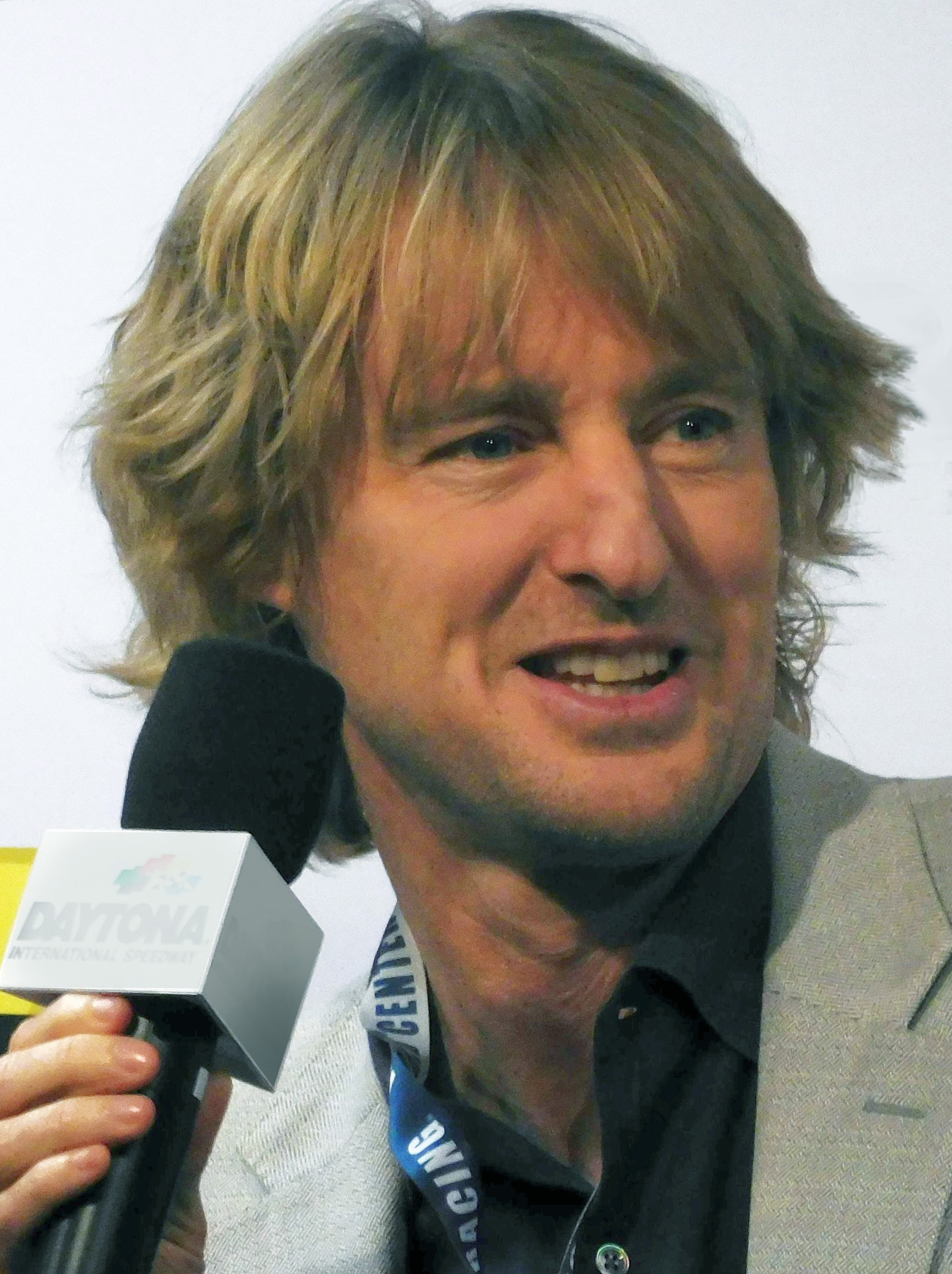
Owen Wilson, pictured in 2017

- Owen Wilson as Lightning McQueen
- Cristela Alonzo as Cruz Ramirez, McQueen's trainer at the Rust-Eze Racing Center with ambitions to become a racer herself.
- Chris Cooper as Smokey, Doc Hudson's old crew chief.
- Armie Hammer as Jackson Storm, a next-generation racecar and McQueen's new rival.
- Larry the Cable Guy as Tow Mater
- Bonnie Hunt as Sally Carrera
- Nathan Fillion as Sterling, the new owner of Rust-Eze.
- Lea DeLaria as Miss Fritter, an eccentric school bus who enjoys competing in the demolition derbies at Thunder Hollow.
- Kerry Washington as Natalie Certain, a statistical analyst who provides insight and data on the next-generation racers.

Also reprising their roles from previous Cars media are Tony Shalhoub as Luigi, Guido Quaroni as Guido, John Ratzenberger as Mack, Lloyd Sherr as Fillmore, Cheech Marin as Ramone, Paul Dooley as Sarge, Jenifer Lewis as Flo, Katherine Helmond as Lizzie (in her final franchise appearance before her death in 2019), and Michael Wallis as Sheriff; an uncredited Jerome Ranft, reprising his role from Cars Toons: Tales from Radiator Springs (2013), replaces his late brother Joe Ranft from the first film as Red; Ray Magliozzi reprises his role as Dusty Rust-eze, one of the former co-owners of Rust-Eze, while his brother Tom, who died in 2014, appears as Rusty Rust-eze through unused audio recordings from the first film as well as audio sourced from his and Ray's radio show, Car Talk. Paul Newman posthumously appears as Doc Hudson, through archived and unused audio recordings from the first film and its tie-in video game.

Margo Martindale, Isiah Whitlock Jr., and Junior Johnson respectively voice Louise "Barnstormer" Nash, River Scott, Junior "Midnight" Moon, Doc Hudson's old racing friends; Madeleine McGraw voices a car version of herself in the audience known as Maddy McGear; Andra Day voices Sweet Tea, a forklift from Thomasville who is a singer at the local pub; Bob Peterson replaces Michael Keaton from the first film as Chick Hicks, and also voices Dr. Damage, an ambulance who takes part in the demolition derby at Thunder Hollow.

Additionally, several NASCAR drivers and other related personalities make cameo appearances: Chase Elliott, Ryan Blaney, Bubba Wallace, and Daniel Suárez respectively voice next-generation racer versions of themselves known as Chase Racelott, Ryan "Inside" Laney, Bubba Wheelhouse, and Danny Swervez; Shannon Spake voices Shannon Spokes, a reporter for the Piston Cup; Ray Evernham voices as Ray Reverham, Jackson Storm's crew chief; Mike Joy voices Mike Joyride, an unseen talk show host that McQueen listens to during his forced retirement; Richard Petty reprises his role of Strip "The King" Weathers from the first film, while his son Kyle Petty voices Strip's nephew Cal Weathers; Humpy Wheeler (in his final franchise appearance before his death in 2025), Jeff Gordon, Darrell Waltrip, and Bob Costas respectively reprise their roles of Tex Dinoco, Jeff Gorvette, Darrell Cartrip, and Bob Cutlass; Lewis Hamilton, who provided the voice of a car version of himself in the second film, voices Hamilton, Cruz's computerized assistant; Sebastian Vettel and Fernando Alonso voice the foreign language versions of Hamilton, with Vettel voicing 'Vettel' and 'Sebastian' in the Italian and German dubs respectively, and Alonso voicing 'Fernando' in the Spanish dub.

== Production ==
Development on Cars 3 began in late 2011 after the release of Cars 2, and by March 2014, pre-production on the film was underway. In October 2014, Pixar's then-chief creative officer John Lasseter revealed at the Tokyo International Film Festival that the film would feature a tribute to Hayao Miyazaki's film The Castle of Cagliostro, in a form of an old Citroën 2CV.

Prior to the film's release, Lasseter, who had directed the previous Cars films, stated that the film would have a "very emotional story", similar in tone to the first film. Co-writer Kiel Murray, who also co-wrote the original Cars, said of the return to the series' roots, "With these franchises you always want to know who it's about. The first movie was about McQueen, and the second movie was a sort of off-ramp to the Mater story. We wanted to get back to the McQueen story. When we looked at what would be next for him, we wondered what that would be like both as an athlete, and also for what he was dealing with in the rest of his life."

According to director Brian Fee, the production team did a lot of research, and, while they "looked at athletes in other sports", the team mainly focused on NASCAR racers. Fee said that they "even talked to a sports psychoanalyst who explained that many of these drivers can't imagine themselves doing anything else", an idea that resonated with the team. Mike Rich said that rookies taking over the sport is a "kind of endless story in sports" and compared McQueen to Wayne Gretzky and Misty May-Treanor as well as many others. Fee said that "being a parent became [his] main resource to find and understand the emotion" in the film's storyline. Scott Morse, the film's story supervisor, said that he wanted to highlight the film's emotional core and the character's relationships, wanting the film to feel like a sports film while also focusing on McQueen realizing "what their relationship meant to Doc".

On January 5, 2017, it was announced that Armie Hammer and Cristela Alonzo would voice Jackson Storm and Cruz Ramirez, respectively. Two months later, Nathan Fillion, Kerry Washington and Lea DeLaria joined the cast.

The production utilized a new rendering mode, Rix Integration Subsystem (RIS), which made scenes like the demolition derby race possible. RIS was previously used in Finding Dory (2016). In previous Pixar films, the animators had to do the animation first before the rendering, but RIS allowed animation and rendering to take place simultaneously in a process called "hardware shading", making it much easier for the animators to see what a completed scene would look like when finished.

Fee said that the film's animation is "art directed realism" and stated that it causes the film's characters and sets to "feel more real and alive than ever before", while Bill Cone, the film's production designer, said that "The term [they] use is believability, which is the basis for everything [Pixar does]". Global technology supervisor Sudeep Rangaswamy said that his team used an automatic process for the film's shots, which, in his words "allows a lot of flexibility" and that "It made shots that were previously impossible to render possible". Director of photography-camera Jeremy Lasky and editor Jason Hudak researched NASCAR footage for the film's race scenes.

== Music ==
Fee said that both the score and the soundtrack "really help support the story we are telling". Both the soundtrack and the score were released on June 16, 2017.

The soundtrack features "Run That Race", an original song written and performed by Dan Auerbach, who stated the song is "about never giving up and always trying your best". Auerbach said that the filmmakers showed him the story and some dialogue, from which he pieced together a story for the song. The soundtrack also features "Ride", an original song performed by ZZ Ward featuring Gary Clark Jr., which was released as a single on April 14, 2017.

The film's score was composed by Pixar's frequent collaborator, Randy Newman, who previously composed the first film's score. Tom MacDougall, Disney's executive vice-president of music, said that Newman has "a real connection to the Cars world" and that "His ability to capture the feelings on this film, its characters, locations, and the Americana theme throughout is extraordinary-the music is so naturally fluid and inspired. It really feels like Randy is coming home with this score." Newman quoted tracks from the first film in moments where Fee "wanted to evoke an earlier time".

== Release ==
=== Theatrical ===
Cars 3 was released in theaters on June 16, 2017, in the United States, in 3D, Dolby Cinema and selected IMAX theaters, accompanied by the Pixar short film Lou. The film had a special screening for the NASCAR industry in Kannapolis, North Carolina on May 23, 2017. The world premiere was held in Anaheim, California on June 10, 2017.

=== Video game ===
A tie-in video game was announced to accompany the film's release. It was developed by Avalanche Software, which was shut down by Disney in 2016, but was acquired and revived by Warner Bros. Interactive Entertainment. It was released on Nintendo Switch, PlayStation 3, PlayStation 4, Wii U, Xbox 360, and Xbox One on June 13, 2017, in North America, in Europe and Australia on July 14, 2017, and in Japan on July 20, 2017. As Disney no longer develops and publishes video games after the release of Disney Infinity 3.0, Warner Bros. Interactive Entertainment published the tie-in game.

=== Home media ===
Cars 3 was released on Digital HD on October 24, 2017, and was released on DVD, Blu-ray, and 4K Ultra HD Blu-ray on November 7, 2017, by Walt Disney Studios Home Entertainment. Physical copies contain an audio commentary, behind-the-scenes featurettes, deleted scenes, and the short films Miss Fritter's Racing Skoool and Lou.

=== Short film ===
The BBC, Disney and Lego released a short film via YouTube, on April 13, 2018, that is inspired by both the Cars franchise as well as the popular TV series Top Gear. The film tells the story of Lightning McQueen's trip to the Top Gear track, where he achieves his dream of racing against the Stig.

== Reception ==
=== Box office ===
Cars 3 grossed $152.9 million in the United States and Canada and $231 million in other territories for a worldwide total of $383.9 million, against a production budget of $175 million.

In North America, Cars 3 was released alongside Rough Night, 47 Meters Down and All Eyez on Me, and was projected to gross $55–60 million from 4,256 theaters in its opening weekend. It made $2.8 million from Thursday night previews and $19.5 million on its first day. It went on to open to $53.7 million, finishing first at the box office and dethroning two-time first-place finisher Wonder Woman. Cars 3 had the lowest opening of the series, but nevertheless was the 16th Pixar film to debut at number one. In its second weekend, the film grossed $24.1 million, dropping to third place, behind Transformers: The Last Knight and Wonder Woman. In its third weekend the film made $9.7 million ($14.1 million over the five-day 4 July holiday weekend), dropping to fifth.

=== Critical response ===
On the review aggregator website Rotten Tomatoes, 70% of 233 critics' reviews are positive, with an average rating of 6.10/10. The website's consensus reads: "Cars 3 has an unexpectedly poignant story to go with its dazzling animation, suggesting Pixar's most middle-of-the-road franchise may have a surprising amount of tread left." Metacritic, which uses a weighted average, assigned the film a score of 59 out of 100, based on 41 critics, indicating "mixed or average" reviews. Audiences polled by CinemaScore gave the film an average grade of "A" on an A+ to F scale.

The film was praised for its animation, story, and emotional depth, and it was considered an improvement over its predecessor by some critics. Owen Gleiberman of Variety wrote, "Cars 3 is a friendly, rollicking movie made with warmth and dash, and to the extent that it taps our primal affection for this series, it more than gets the job done. Yet in many ways it's the tasteful version of a straight-to-DVD (or streaming) sequel." David Fear of Rolling Stone gave the film a positive review, saying: "There's an emotional resonance to this story about growing old, chasing glory days and the joy of passing the baton that leaves the other two films choking on its digitally rendered dust. The end goal this time out isn't just to sell a few more toys and Lightning McQueen lunchboxes. It's actually tapping into something deeper than a corporate bottom line." Mike Ryan of Uproxx called the film "the Rocky III of the Cars franchise", and wrote "There's a hint of sadness that seems to be present throughout Cars 3 that gives it a little more weight than the previous installments."

Alonso Duralde of TheWrap gave the film a mixed review, saying: "As a spawner of merchandise, Cars 3 fires on all pistons but, as a movie, it's a harmless but never stimulating 109 minutes." Vicky Roach of News.com.au gave the film 3 out of 4 stars, saying: "Returning to the iconic, backroads nostalgia of the original film, Cars 3 puts the flashy, unpopular middle film squarely in its rear vision mirror. The route that the filmmakers take might be familiar, but after gunning it, they take the corners like pros."

=== Accolades ===
Award	Date of ceremony	Category	Recipient(s)	Result	Ref.
Teen Choice Awards	August 13, 2017	Choice Movie: Comedy	Walt Disney Pictures	Nominated	
Teen Choice Awards	August 13, 2017	Choice Movie Actor: Comedy	Owen Wilson	Nominated	
Detroit Film Critics Society	December 7, 2017	Best Animated Film	Cars 3	Nominated	
St. Louis Film Critics Association	December 15, 2017	Best Animated Feature	Brian Fee	Nominated	
IGN Awards	December 19, 2017	Best Animated Movie	Cars 3	Nominated	
Image Awards	January 15, 2018	Outstanding Character Voice-Over Performance	Kerry Washington	Nominated	
Satellite Awards	February 10, 2018	Best Animated or Mixed Media Feature	Cars 3	Nominated	
Art Directors Guild	January 27, 2018	Production Design in an Animated Feature	William Cone and Jay Shuster	Nominated	
Visual Effects Society Awards	February 13, 2018	Outstanding Visual Effects in an Animated Feature	Brian Fee, Kevin Reher, Michael Fong, and Jon Reisch	Nominated	
Visual Effects Society Awards	February 13, 2018	Outstanding Created Environment in an Animated Feature	Marlena Fecho, Thidartana Annee Jonjai, Jose L. Ramos Serrano, and Frank Tai for "Abandoned Racetrack"	Nominated	
Visual Effects Society Awards	February 13, 2018	Outstanding Effects Simulations in an Animated Feature	Greg Gladstone, Stephen Marshall, Leon JeongWook Park, and Tim Speltz	Nominated	
Annie Award	February 3, 2018	Best Animated Feature	Kevin Reher	Nominated	
Annie Award	February 3, 2018	Animated Effects in an Animated Production	Amit Baadkar, Greg Gladstone, Stephen Marshall, Tim Speltz, and Jon Reisch	Nominated	
Cinema Audio Society Awards	February 24, 2018	Outstanding Achievement in Sound Mixing for a Motion Picture – Animated	Doc Kane, Tom Meyers, Michael Semanick, Nathan Nance, David Boucher, and Blake Collins	Nominated	
Nickelodeon Kids' Choice Awards	March 24, 2018	Favorite Animated Movie	Cars 3	Nominated	
Saturn Awards	June 27, 2018	Best Animated Film	Cars 3	Nominated	

== Future ==
Regarding a possible Cars 4, Cars 3 producers Kevin Reher and Andrea Warren stated speaking to CinemaBlend that "If there's a good story to tell, I mean, our heads kinda break after having gotten this one done, like "Oh my god," what could you do the further adventures of? But like any sequel, from Toy Story 4 to Incredibles 2, as long as there's a good story to tell it's worth investing, we do love these characters, we love them as much as the public does." Regarding which character would be the main protagonist in the film, Reher and Warren stated that "if Cruz is a breakout character, kind of like Mater was, she would be involved in a 4". Owen Wilson stated at a Cars 3 press event that possible stories have been discussed for a Cars 4, though he would personally like for a fourth Cars film to delve into aspects of the thriller genre, akin to Cars 2. In an interview with Screen Rant, Lea DeLaria expressed interest in reprising her role as Miss Fritter while promoting the release of the short film, Miss Fritter's Racing Skoool with the Cars 3 DVD and Blu-ray release.

Cars on the Road, a miniseries following the events of Cars 3, premiered on the Disney+ streaming service on September 8, 2022.

In December 2023, during an interview at the 2023 Porsche Rennsport Reunion Event, the creative director of the saga, Jay Ward, revealed that Pixar is developing new projects related to the franchise: "There are more Cars things brewing, I can't say much more yet. Cars has got a life that will keep going. I am working on some real fun projects right now that you will see in a couple of years. It takes us a while to make them."
