= Berean Christian School =

Berean Christian School may refer to:

- Berean Christian School (Fairview Heights, Illinois)
- Berean Christian School (Knoxville, Tennessee)
- Berean Christian School (West Palm Beach, Florida)
- Berean Christian High School (Walnut Creek, California)
- Berean Academy (Florida) — Lutz, Florida
- Berean Academy (Kansas)
