= List of Top Country Albums number ones of 2005 =

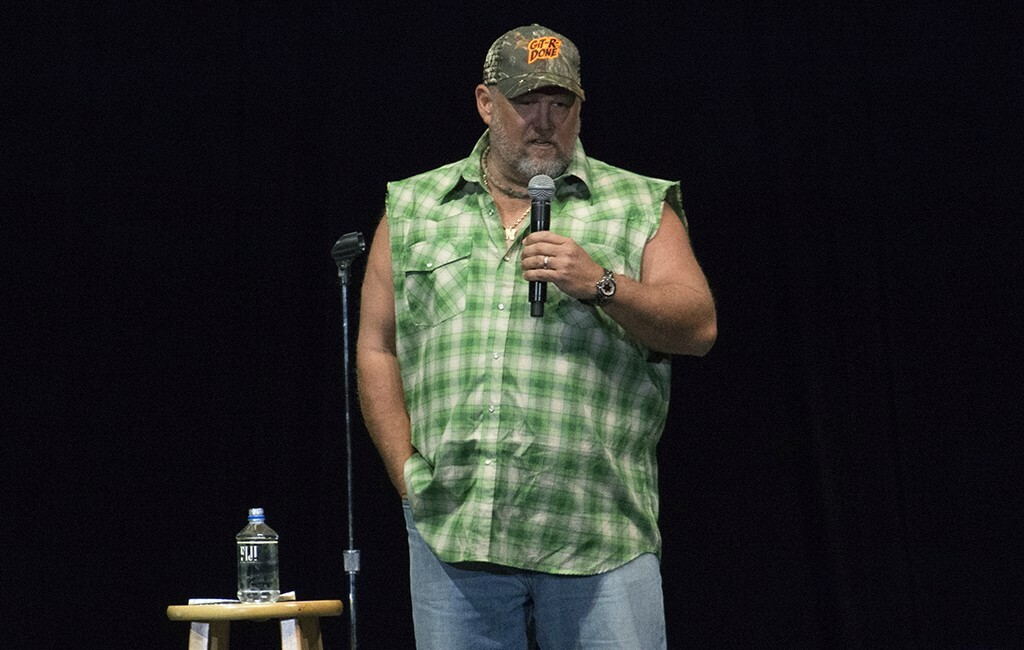
Comedian Larry the Cable Guy had an unusual country number one with his predominantly spoken-word album The Right to Bare Arms.

Top Country Albums is a chart that ranks the top-performing country music albums in the United States, published by Billboard. In 2005, 21 different albums topped the chart, based on electronic point of sale data provided by SoundScan Inc.

In the issue of Billboard dated January 1, Shania Twain's album Greatest Hits was at number one, its sixth week in the top spot. It remained at number one through the issue dated February 5, after which it was displaced by Kenny Chesney's Be as You Are (Songs from an Old Blue Chair). Chesney was the only act to achieve more than one number one, as he would return to the top of the chart in November with The Road and the Radio. Toby Keith spent the highest cumulative total number of weeks at number one in 2005, topping the chart for seven non-consecutive weeks with Honkytonk University. The album's time at number one was interrupted by George Strait's Somewhere Down in Texas, which made Strait the first act to achieve 20 number ones on the Top Country Albums chart. Somewhere Down in Texas also topped the all-genre Billboard 200 chart, as did both of Chesney's albums and Fireflies by Faith Hill.

Several acts reached number one on the Top Country Albums chart for the first time in 2005, including comedian Larry the Cable Guy, who spent four weeks atop the chart with The Right to Bare Arms, a live recording of one of his stand-up comedy performances. The album entered the country chart despite consisting almost entirely of spoken-word performance rather than music; previous albums by the performer and other "redneck"-styled comedians such as Jeff Foxworthy and Bill Engvall had also been deemed eligible for the country albums chart. Five other acts topped the chart in 2005 for the first time: Miranda Lambert with Kerosene in April, Dierks Bentley with Modern Day Drifter in May, Sara Evans with Real Fine Place and Gary Allan with Tough All Over, both in October, and Carrie Underwood with Some Hearts, which reached number one in December and was the year's final chart-topper. Underwood had won the fourth season of TV singing competition American Idol earlier in the year, and Some Hearts, her debut album, would go on to be a major success, becoming the best-selling album of 2006 in the US. Such was its enduring popularity that it was the biggest-selling country music album of both 2006 and 2007. Miranda Lambert had also risen to prominence via a TV singing contest, having finished in third place on the first season of Nashville Star in 2003.

== Chart history ==
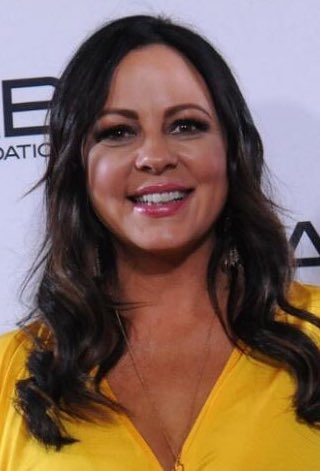
Real Fine Place was the first number one for Sara Evans.

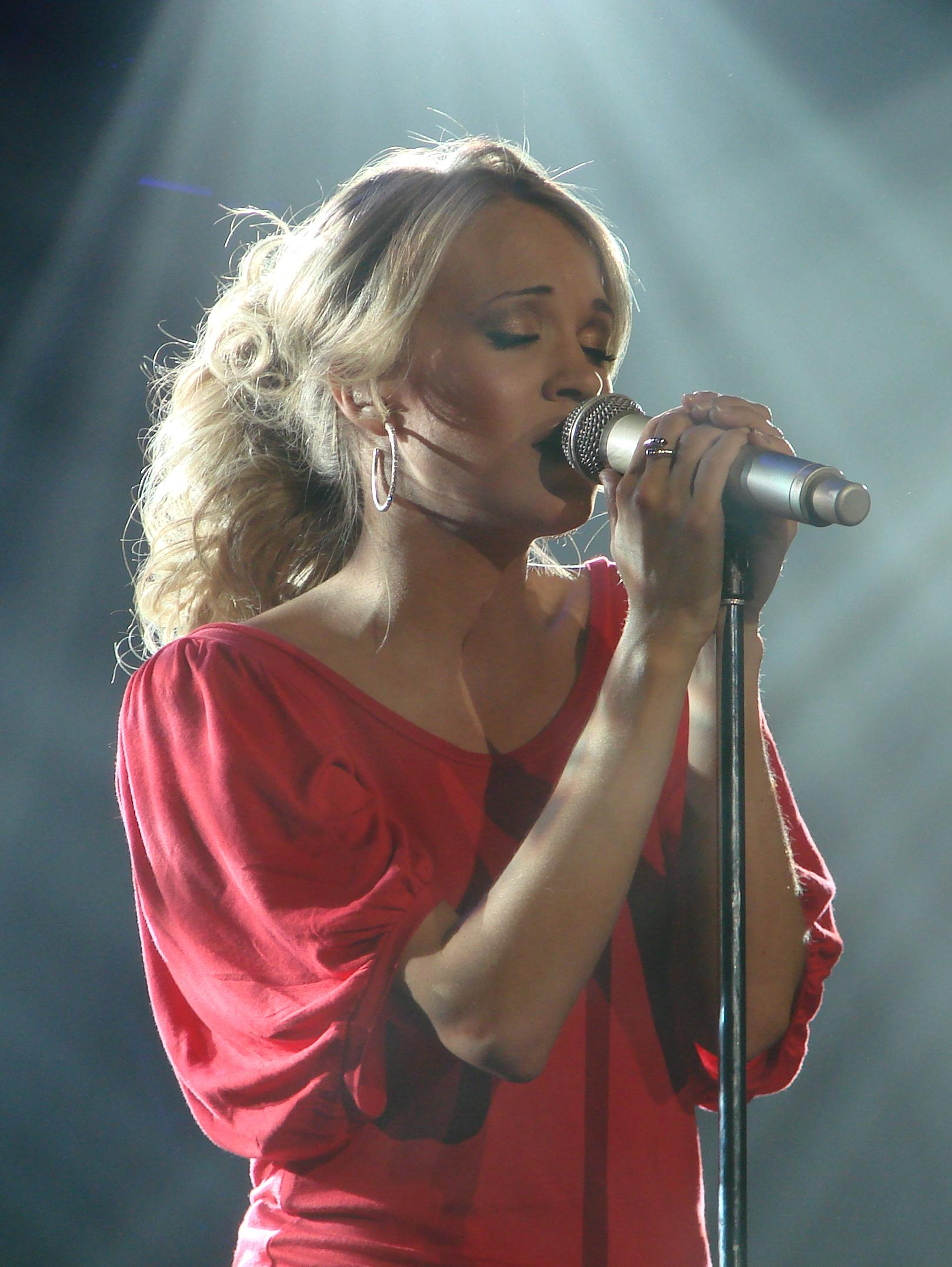
American Idol winner Carrie Underwood topped the chart with her debut album Some Hearts.

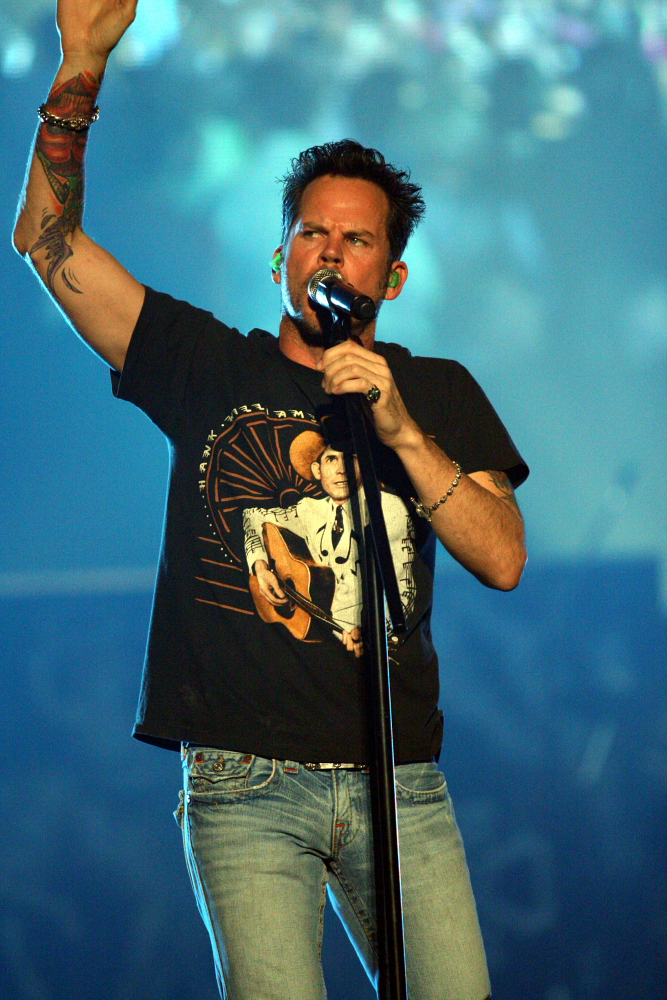
Gary Allan had his first chart-topper with Tough All Over.

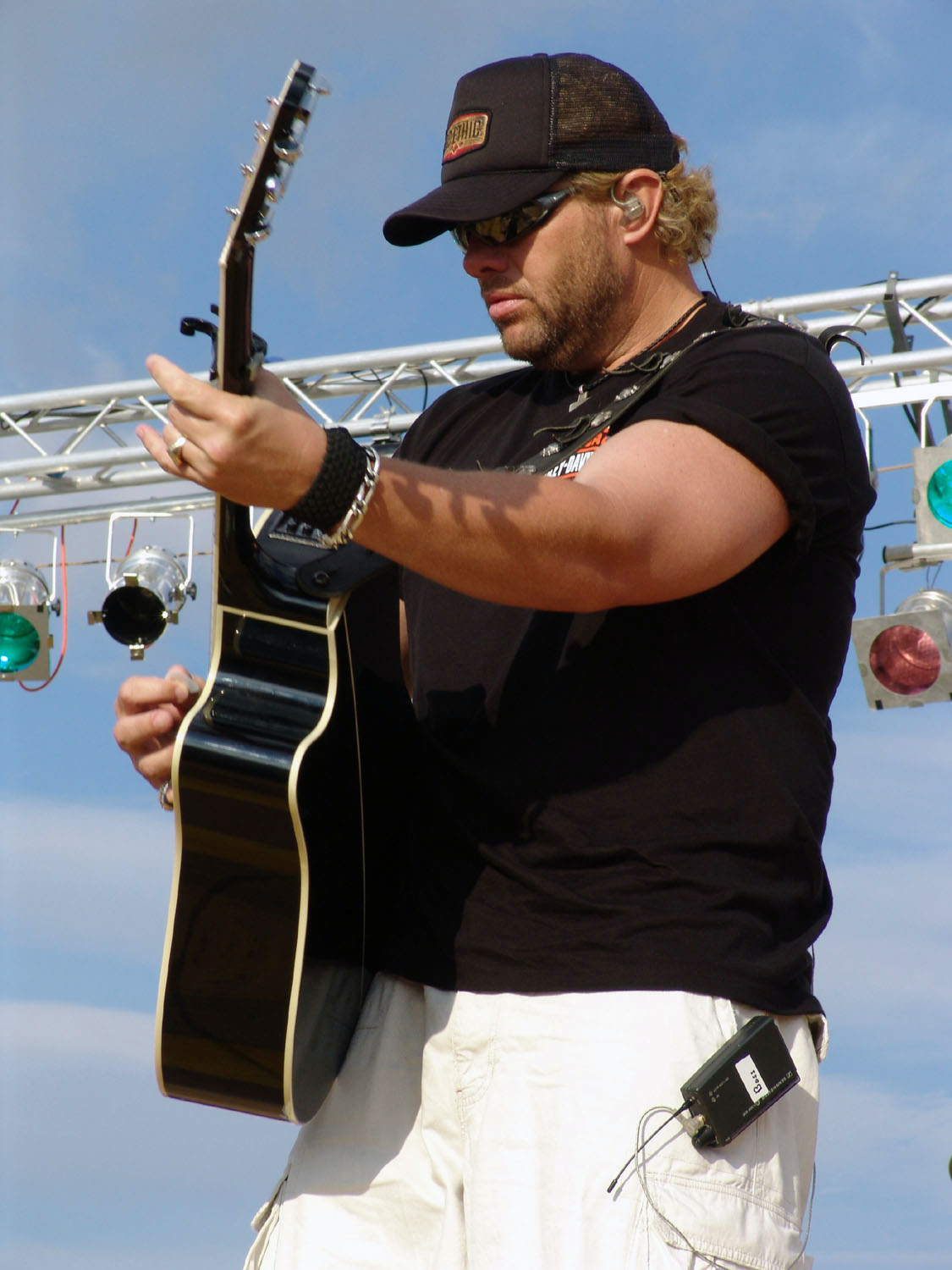
Toby Keith spent seven weeks at number one, the most by any act in 2005.

Issue date	Title	Artist(s)	Ref.
January 1	Greatest Hits	Shania Twain	
January 8	Greatest Hits	Shania Twain	
January 15	Greatest Hits	Shania Twain	
January 22	Greatest Hits	Shania Twain	
January 29	Greatest Hits	Shania Twain	
February 5	Greatest Hits	Shania Twain	
February 12	Be as You Are (Songs from an Old Blue Chair)	Kenny Chesney	
February 19	Be as You Are (Songs from an Old Blue Chair)	Kenny Chesney	
February 26	Totally Country Vol. 4	Various Artists	
March 5	Be as You Are (Songs from an Old Blue Chair)	Kenny Chesney	
March 12	Feels Like Today	Rascal Flatts	
March 19	Feels Like Today	Rascal Flatts	
March 26	Be as You Are (Songs from an Old Blue Chair)	Kenny Chesney	
April 2	Kerosene	Miranda Lambert	
April 9	Songs About Me	Trace Adkins	
April 16	The Right to Bare Arms	Larry the Cable Guy	
April 23	The Right to Bare Arms	Larry the Cable Guy	
April 30	The Right to Bare Arms	Larry the Cable Guy	
May 7	The Right to Bare Arms	Larry the Cable Guy	
May 14	Delicious Surprise	Jo Dee Messina	
May 21	Delicious Surprise	Jo Dee Messina	
May 28	Modern Day Drifter	Dierks Bentley	
June 4	Honkytonk University	Toby Keith	
June 11	Honkytonk University	Toby Keith	
June 18	Honkytonk University	Toby Keith	
June 25	Honkytonk University	Toby Keith	
July 2	Honkytonk University	Toby Keith	
July 9	Honkytonk University	Toby Keith	
July 16	Somewhere Down in Texas	George Strait	
July 23	Somewhere Down in Texas	George Strait	
July 30	Somewhere Down in Texas	George Strait	
August 6	Honkytonk University	Toby Keith	
August 13	Feels Like Today	Rascal Flatts	
August 20	Fireflies	Faith Hill	
August 27	Fireflies	Faith Hill	
September 3	Time Well Wasted	Brad Paisley	
September 10	Time Well Wasted	Brad Paisley	
September 17	Hillbilly Deluxe	Brooks & Dunn	
September 24	Hillbilly Deluxe	Brooks & Dunn	
October 1	Jasper County	Trisha Yearwood	
October 8	Jasper County	Trisha Yearwood	
October 15	All Jacked Up	Gretchen Wilson	
October 22	Real Fine Place	Sara Evans	
October 29	Tough All Over	Gary Allan	
November 5	Timeless	Martina McBride	
November 12	Timeless	Martina McBride	
November 19	Timeless	Martina McBride	
November 26	The Road and the Radio	Kenny Chesney	
December 3	Some Hearts	Carrie Underwood	
December 10	The Road and the Radio	Kenny Chesney	
December 17	Some Hearts	Carrie Underwood	
December 24	Some Hearts	Carrie Underwood	
December 31	Some Hearts	Carrie Underwood	
