= Lisa Lampanelli =

American stand-up comedian and insult comic

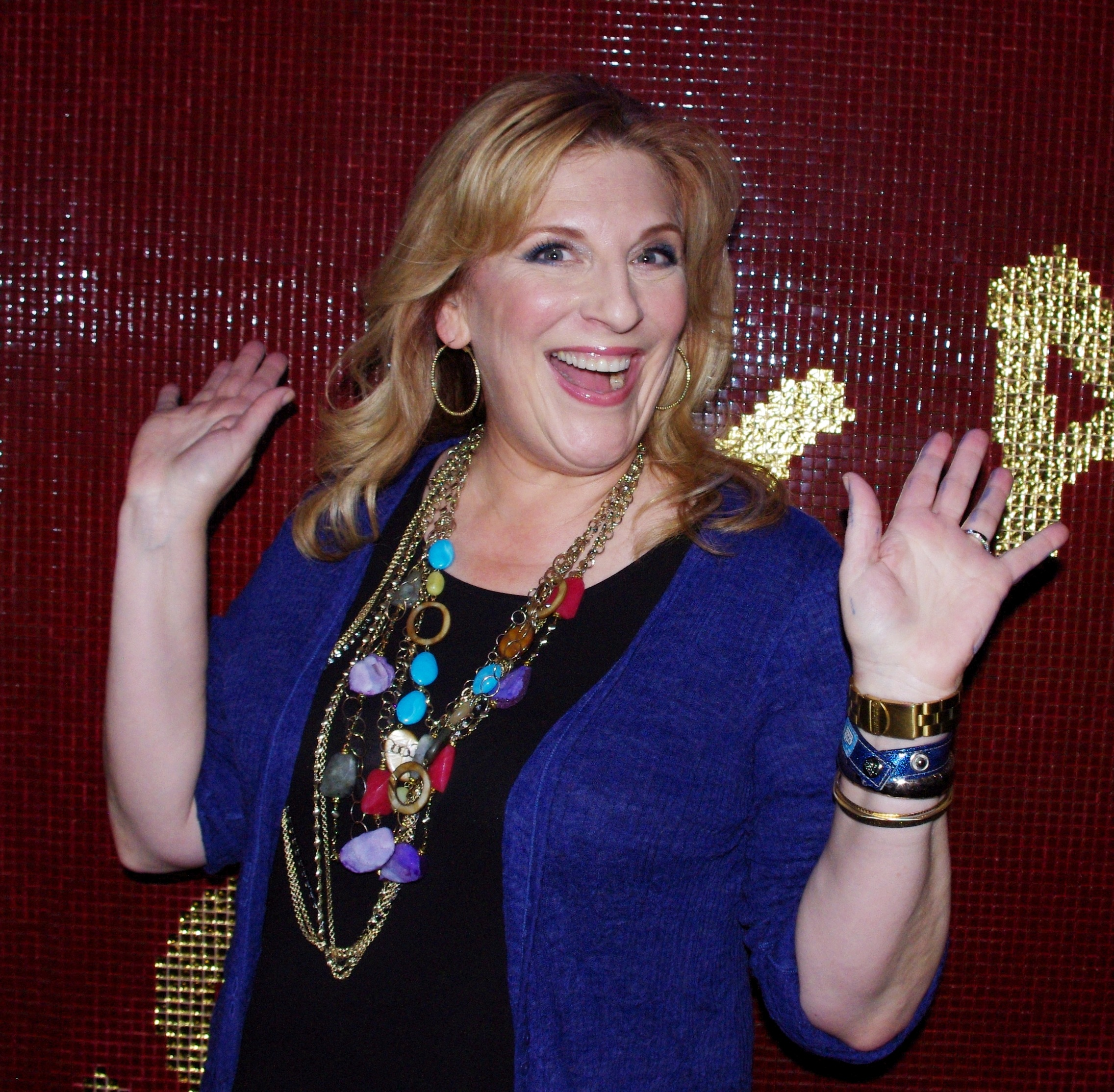
- Lampanelli in 2011
- Born: Lisa Marie Lampugnale; July 19, 1961 (age 65); Trumbull, Connecticut, U.S.
- Other name: Queen of Mean
- Spouse: Jimmy Cannizzaro (m. 2010; div. 2014)

Comedy career
- Years active: 1990–2018
- Medium: Stand-up, television, film
- Genres: Insult comedy, improvisational comedy, observational comedy
- Subjects: Race relations, human sexuality, everyday life
- Website: InsultComic.com

Lisa Lampanelli (born Lisa Marie Lampugnale; July 19, 1961) is an American former stand-up comedian, actress, and insult comic.

== Early life and journalism career ==
Lampanelli was born in Trumbull, Connecticut, to a middle-class family. Three of her grandparents were of Italian descent, and the fourth of Polish ancestry. Her mother, Gloria (née Velgot), worked for the local police department, where "she typed in all the arrests made", and her father, Leonard Lampugnale, worked for Sikorsky Aircraft and later became a painter. Lampanelli attended Roman Catholic schools, studied journalism at Boston College and Syracuse University, and attended the Radcliffe Publishing Course.

She worked as a copy editor at Popular Mechanics and an assistant at Rolling Stone. She was also a fact checker and the first chief of research for Spy magazine; a book about Spy describes her then as "your average decked-out-heavy-metal-head-next-door." Speaking later to Maxim Magazine Online, Lampanelli remarked, "I was a real journalist for Rolling Stone, Spy, Hit Parader. I interviewed those fuckin' hair bands: Cinderella, Slaughter."

== Career ==
=== Comedy ===
Lampanelli began her stand-up career in New York in the early 1990s. She had a break-out role at the 2002 New York Friars' Club roast of Chevy Chase, and went on to participate in the roasts of Denis Leary, Pamela Anderson, Jeff Foxworthy, Flavor Flav, William Shatner, David Hasselhoff, and Donald Trump and to serve as Roastmaster for Larry the Cable Guy. Lampanelli was frequently on the dais for The Howard Stern Show roasts, including appearances at the roasts for Gary Dell'Abate, Artie Lange, Andy Dick, and A&E's "Gene Simmons Roast" in April 2008.

Lampanelli released a comedy special on DVD entitled Take it Like A Man in 2005, appeared in the 2006 motion picture Larry the Cable Guy: Health Inspector, and had a cameo appearance in the VH1 sitcom So NoTORIous. She also landed a deal with Fox for a sitcom pilot with the tentative title Big Loud Lisa, which was considered a candidate for the network's 2006–07 television season. Lampanelli taped her stand-up special Dirty Girl in the fall of 2006, which aired on Comedy Central on January 28, 2007. Her Dirty Girl CD and Dirty Girl—No Protection DVD were released by Warner Bros./Jack Records on January 30, 2007. Lampanelli was also featured in the movie Delta Farce starring Larry the Cable Guy, Bill Engvall, and D.J. Qualls, which was released early in 2008, and in Drillbit Taylor starring Owen Wilson.

Her style of humor was influenced most by the Dean Martin roasts that televised when she was growing up; she did not start watching other stand-up comedians until she became one herself.

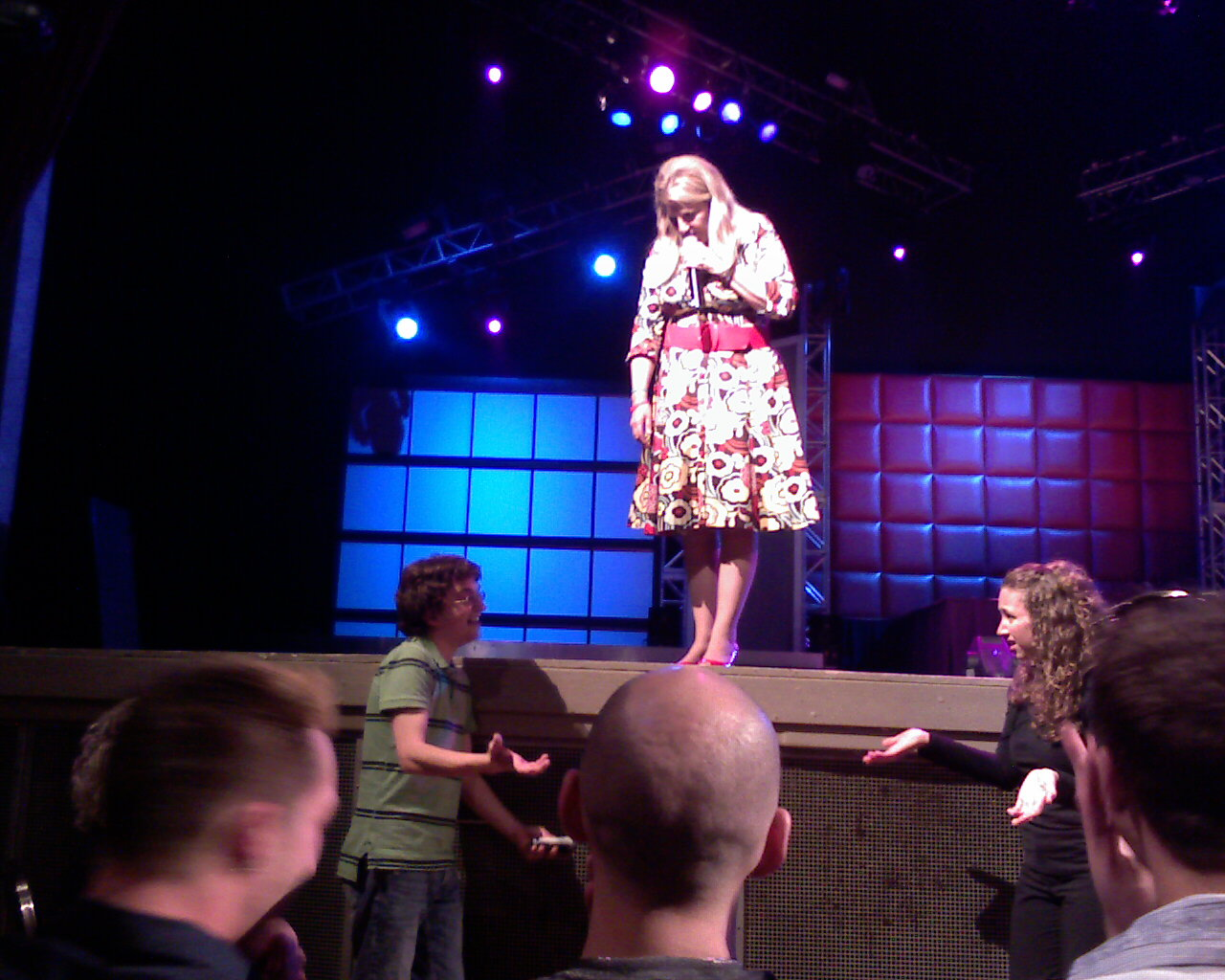
Lampanelli performing in 2008

On November 21, 2008, in Santa Rosa, California, Lampanelli taped her first one-hour HBO Special at the Wells Fargo Center for the Arts. The special, Lisa Lampanelli: Long Live the Queen, which aired January 31, 2009, was directed by Dave Higby, who also directed her Dirty Girl special. In December 2010 she reunited with Higby when he directed her Tough Love special for Comedy Central that aired in the spring of 2011. Her one-woman show, Bring Back the Fat Chick, debuted on Broadway in 2012.

In May 2012, she headlined at the Night of a Thousand Gowns, a huge charity gala in NYC, where she also filmed a cameo for Adam Barta's new "Q&A" music video.

Lampanelli's album Back to the Drawing Board was nominated for Best Comedy Album at the 58th Annual Grammy Awards.

Celebrity Weakest Link

Lampanelli was a contestant on the "Roastmasters" episode of Celebrity Weakest Link on October 6, 2025, and won the grand prize of $50,000 for her chosen charity.

=== The Celebrity Apprentice 5 ===
Lampanelli was a contestant on The Celebrity Apprentice 5 (also known as The Apprentice 12). She was criticized by viewers and had numerous outbursts and clashes with other contestants, including Victoria Gotti, Arsenio Hall, Lou Ferrigno, and (particularly) Dayana Mendoza. In spite of her behavior and relations with other contestants, she raised $130,000 for Gay Men's Health Crisis winning two out of three of the challenges she took on as Project Manager. Lampanelli was fired on May 6, 2012, during the Final Four interview because John Rich and Marlee Matlin thought she was overly emotional.

=== Retirement from comedy ===
On October 30, 2018, Lampanelli announced her retirement from stand-up comedy on The Howard Stern Show in order to become a life coach. She still does storytelling events, which she describes as "heartfelt but funny," in which she talks about her journey with food and weight.

== Books ==
It Books (HarperCollins) is the publisher of Lampanelli's memoir, Chocolate, Please: My Adventures in Food, Fat, and Freaks (2009). Publishers Weekly reviewed:

After more than 30 pages on her search for the "perfect black man," Lampanelli moves on to outline her standup career, from handling hecklers to doing The Tonight Show... Seeking the roots of her humor, she recalls her childhood as an "attention whore": "Eating to get attention is a behavior that I continued into my high school days." She follows her memories of "fat rehab" with a variety of topics, from the Virgin Mary to vegans. Much is quite funny, and Lampanelli never pulls her punches. Despite her raw language and raucous writing, honest reflections and stark self-insights emerge as she probes her past.

== Personal life ==
Lampanelli married in 1991 and divorced soon afterward. She married Jimmy Cannizzaro, a former tavern owner from Valley Stream, New York, on October 2, 2010, at the New York Friars' Club. In May 2014, she filed for divorce from Cannizzaro after three and a half years of marriage.

Lampanelli is a supporter of the LGBTQ+ community. When members of the Westboro Baptist Church planned to protest against a show she held on May 20, 2011, in Topeka, Kansas, she promised to donate $1,000 to Gay Men's Health Crisis (the same charity she contributed to during The Celebrity Apprentice) for every protester that attended. After an initial count of 44 protesters, she rounded up the donation to an even $50,000, crediting the donation as being "made possible by the WBC."
