= Orpheum Theatre (Minneapolis) =

Theater in Minneapolis, Minnesota, U.S.

- Hennepin Theater
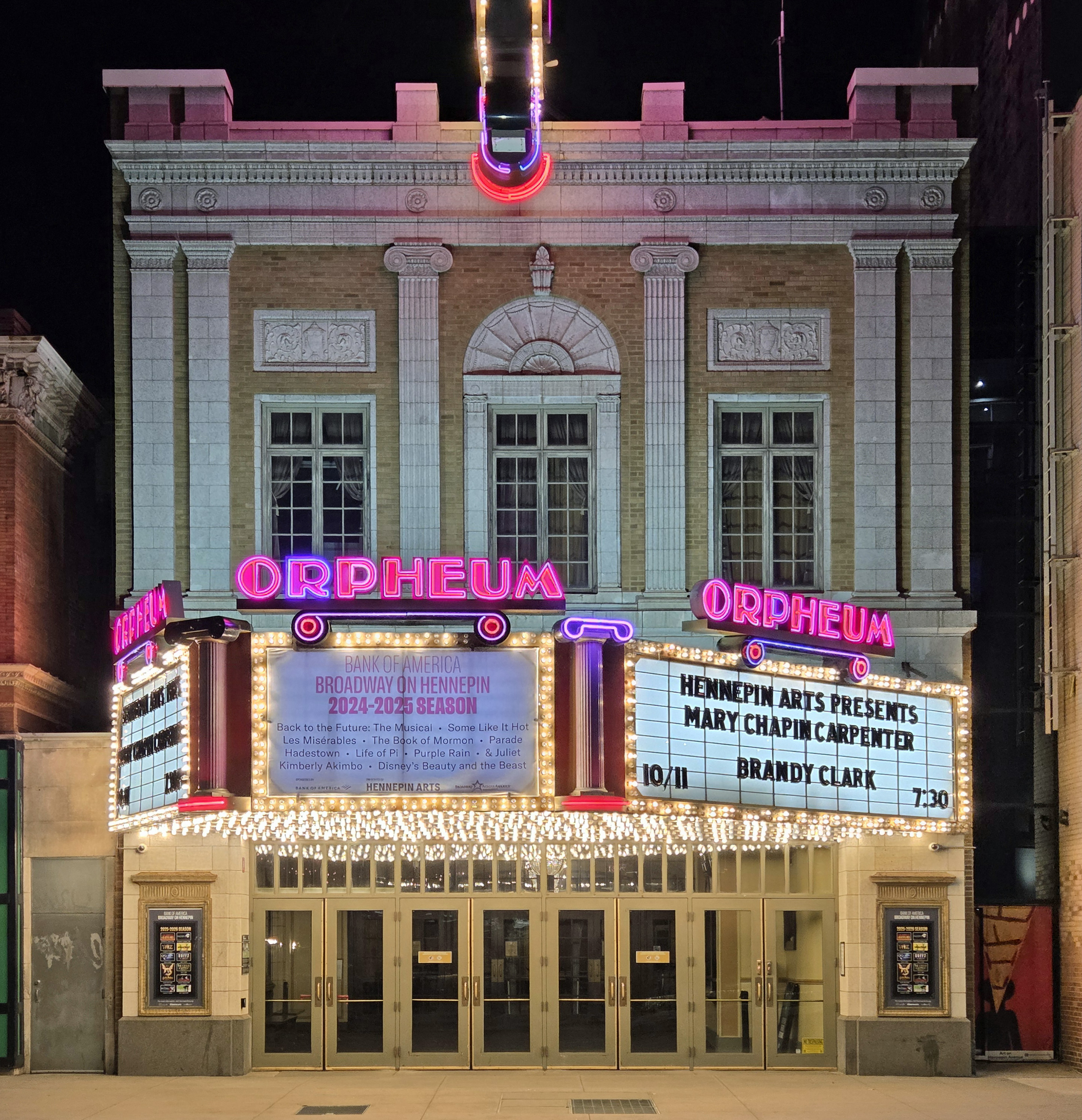
- The Orpheum Theatre in 2025
- Interactive map of Orpheum Theatre
- Address: 910 Hennepin Avenue; Minneapolis, Minnesota; United States
- Owner: Hennepin Arts
- Operator: Historic Theatre Group
- Capacity: 2,579

Construction
- Opened: 1921
- Reopened: 1993

Website
- hennepinarts.org/venues/orpheum-theatre
- Hennepin Theatre
- U.S. National Register of Historic Places
- Minneapolis Landmark
- Coordinates: 44°58′35″N 93°16′39″W
- Built: 1921
- Architect: Kirchhoff & Rose
- Architectural style: Beaux-Arts
- NRHP reference No.: 95001548

Significant dates
- Added to NRHP: January 19, 1996
- Designated MPLSL: 1986

The Orpheum Theatre is a historic venue located in downtown Minneapolis. It is one of four restored theaters on Hennepin Avenue, alongside the State Theatre, the Pantages Theatre, and the Shubert Theatre (now The Cowles Center).

== History ==
The building opened on October 16, 1921, originally named the Hennepin Theater. Its inaugural performers included the Marx Brothers, with over 70,000 guests attending during the opening week. Billed as the largest vaudeville house in the country at the time, the Orpheum became a major platform for entertainers such as Jack Benny, George Burns, and Fanny Brice.

The Orpheum featured a playroom and daycare off the mezzanine lobby, and backstage, it had eight floors of dressing rooms. As vaudeville declined in the 1930s and 1940s, the Orpheum shifted to being one of Minneapolis's major cinema houses, screening films like Gone with the Wind, which sold out every show for three weeks in 1940.

Additionally, it hosted famous big bands, including Benny Goodman, Tommy Dorsey, and Count Basie. In 1959, Ted Mann, who owned six other downtown Minneapolis theaters, including the Pantages, purchased the Orpheum and began bringing in touring productions such as My Fair Lady and Fiddler on the Roof. Movies continued to be shown as well, with the 1965 James Bond film Thunderball breaking box office records. The Orpheum also set a record in Minneapolis for first-run engagements of Best Picture Oscar winners—nine in total—including From Here to Eternity in 1953 and The Godfather in 1972.

The theater features two distinct structures: a long, narrow lobby that extends from a slim facade along Hennepin Avenue, and an auditorium that is set back and parallels Hawthorne Avenue. The beautifully restored lobby includes six terra cotta bas relief sculptures, while the auditorium is extravagantly decorated with intricate plaster work, garlands, swags, medallions, and other ornate details. The ceiling boasts a dome adorned with 30,000 squares of aluminum leaf. Currently, the theater seats 2,579 guests—1,500 in the main floor and 1,100 in the three-level balcony—making it the largest among the three theaters on Hennepin Avenue. Productions that have premiered at the Orpheum include Victor/Victoria, The 101 Dalmatians Musical, the pre-Broadway world premiere of The Lion King, and the national tour premiere of Elton John and Tim Rice's Aida.

== 1993 Renovation and reopening ==
In 1988, the Minneapolis Community Development Agency acquired the Orpheum Theatre from Bob Dylan (who owned the Orpheum from 1979 to 1988) and his brother, David Zimmerman. The Minneapolis City Council wanted to revitalize Hennepin Avenue as an entertainment destination. The nearby State Theatre had undergone renovation and reopened in 1991. However, the Orpheum had a deeper stage that could accommodate larger sets necessary for productions such as Miss Saigon, which was set to open on January 14, 1994. The city agreed to finance the renovation by issuing bonds to be repaid through a $2 surcharge on tickets for both the Orpheum and the State.

The first phase of the renovation started in 1993. To support elaborate Broadway productions, the Orpheum's stage was extended by nearly 20 feet, requiring the meticulous removal of the back wall brick by brick. Initially, aesthetic improvements—such as cleaning the facade and restoring the lobby—were planned for a second phase. However, during the first phase, a terra cotta wall was discovered behind a plain wall in the vestibule, 85 percent intact. When a laborer knocked through a layer of plain plaster, he uncovered plaster sculptural reliefs depicting griffins and urns. During the lobby renovation, unexpected architectural discoveries emerged, including six Pompeiian friezes that had been hidden behind velour curtains, fake window grids, and a false wall. Following a $10 million restoration, the Orpheum reopened in December 1993 with a concert by Heart, and in January 1994, it debuted the Broadway production of Miss Saigon. In 2005, the city transferred the ownership of its theaters to Hennepin Arts, formerly known as Hennepin Theatre Trust.

== Entertainment ==
- Cheap Trick - November 23, 1983 (with Aldo Nova) played to a nearly empty house due to a heavy snowstorm
- Phish - November 26, 1994 Highlights include what was at the time the longest ever version of David Bowie (clocking in at 37:27) and the version of Slave to the Traffic Light featured on "A Live One".
- Barenaked Ladies
- Bob Dylan - 1992
- Luis Miguel - February 12, 2000
- Crowded House - September 9, 2007
- Diana Krall - March 15, 2002 August 7, 2015
- Barry Manilow - February 28 - March 1, 2002
- John Prine - September 30, 2000
- Celtic Woman - October 22, 2005, April 5, 2006, April 17–18, 2007, April 13, 2013 (2 shows), June 13, 2017
- Brian Wilson - September 30, 2004, October 2, 2016, November 28, 2018

Comedy

- Jeff Foxworthy taped Have Your Loved Ones Spayed or Neutered here in 2004.
- Larry the Cable Guy taped Morning Constitutions here in 2006.
- Jeff Foxworthy and Larry the Cable Guy recorded the Netflix special We've Been Thinking here on March 19, 2016.
- The Tonight Show Starring Jimmy Fallon recorded its Super Bowl postgame show here in 2018.
- Ellen DeGeneres recorded the Netflix special For Your Approval in August 2024.

Musicals

- Waitress
- Mamma Mia!
- The Lion King
- The Phantom of the Opera
