= Christmastime in Larryland =

Studio album by Larry the Cable Guy
- Released: October 3, 2007
- Genre: Comedy
- Length: 1:01:55
- Label: Warner Bros.
- Producer: J.P. Williams

Larry the Cable Guy chronology
Morning Constitutions (2007)	Christmastime in Larryland (2007)	On the Can (2009)

Professional ratings
Review scores
Source	Rating
Allmusic	2.5/5 stars

Christmastime in Larryland is the fifth album by American comedian Larry the Cable Guy. It is his second album of Christmas-themed material, following 2004's A Very Larry Christmas. It is a concept album presented in the style of a variety show Christmas special. Christmastime in Larryland was released on October 3, 2007, on Warner Bros. Records.

== Track listing ==
All material written by Larry the Cable Guy.

1. "Introduction & Opening Monologue" – 6:41
2. "Lapquest" – 0:31
3. "Eulogy" – 2:59
4. "Tobacco Company Choir" – 1:20
5. "Plus-Sized Fashion Shorts" – 1:06
6. "Nativity Scene" – 6:36
7. "Farting Jingle Bells" – 0:38
8. "Bobblehead Heating Dolls" – 1:06
9. "Comedian Muhammad & Oscar" – 0:47
10. "Holiday Carols" – 1:52
11. "A Santa's Q&A" – 10:58
12. "Nutcracker" – 0:34
13. "Dysfunctional Family Christmas" – 3:34
14. "Liberal Commie Environmental Poem" – 3:25
15. "Magic O' the Mime" – 1:43
16. "1-900…" – 0:58
17. "The Chitmunks" – 4:06
18. "Patriotic Poem" – 2:57
19. "Medley of Carols" – 0:49
20. "Closing Monologue" – 3:22

== Charts ==
=== Weekly charts ===
Chart (2007)	Peak position
US Billboard 200	42
US Top Comedy Albums (Billboard)	1
US Top Country Albums (Billboard)	12

=== Year-end charts ===
Chart (2008)	Position
US Top Comedy Albums (Billboard)	3
US Top Country Albums (Billboard)	39
