= Larry the Cable Guy: Health Inspector =

- Theatrical release poster
- Directed by: Trent Cooper
- Written by: Jonathan Bernstein; James Greer
- Produced by: Alan C. Blomquist; J.P. Williams
- Starring: Larry the Cable Guy; Iris Bahr; Bruce Bruce; Joanna Cassidy; Brooke Dillman; Tony Hale; David Koechner; Lisa Lampanelli; Megyn Price; Tom Wilson; Joe Pantoliano
- Cinematography: Kim Marks
- Edited by: Gregg Featherman
- Music by: Tim P. Stephen Phillips
- Production companies: Samwilla; Shaler Entertainment; Parallel Entertainment Pictures
- Distributed by: Lionsgate
- Release date: March 24, 2006
- Running time: 89 minutes
- Country: United States
- Language: English
- Budget: $17 million
- Box office: $15.6 million

Larry the Cable Guy: Health Inspector is a 2006 American comedy film starring American stand-up comedian Larry the Cable Guy.

Larry, a municipal restaurant health inspector, is assigned a new rookie partner after recklessly closing restaurants for code violations, Amy Butlin (Iris Bahr), by his boss, Bart Tatlock (Tom Wilson). Together, Larry and Amy work to solve a series of food poisonings at four-star restaurants.

The film was released on March 24, 2006. It was panned by critics.

== Plot ==
Larry is a big city health inspector with questionable practices and his own way of doing things. Larry's boss, Bart Tatlock, in an attempt to acquire information on his activities in order to get him fired, assigns Larry a new partner, Amy Butlin, a by-the-book professional who takes the job seriously. She tries to learn the ropes of health inspection while putting up with Larry and his personality as well as getting the information Tatlock needs to get Larry fired. Larry eventually begins a relationship with Jane Whitley, who recently worked at a lingerie shop but got fired for knocking down some mannequins and wound up waitressing at a French restaurant.

As Larry and Amy do their job as city health inspection team, a serial criminal is sabotaging four-star restaurants, for starters, folks started getting diarrhea at the restaurant Jane worked at. Trying to avert a panic, and keep the matter of the poisoning under control, Tatlock puts his best people on the job, and not Larry. There was another incident where lab rats were set off in an Italian Bistro. Larry and Amy are called in on one of the poisonings, but Tatlock forbids them from working on such an important case. Larry and Amy continue to inspect lower-profile restaurants, but the Mayor Maurice T. Gunn is tricked into assigning Larry and Amy to the more important poison case, much to Larry and Amy's enthusiasm. Later on Larry and Jane go on a date at Micelli's and are vouched by the mayor, but later got sick to their stomachs afterwards. Back on the case, Larry and Amy learn that all restaurants that were sabotaged were contestants for a television cook-off show, Top Chef, and go undercover at one of the restaurants, and obtain a tape recording of a conversation between the Mayor Gunn and Chef Leon, in which the chef clarifies Gunn's request that the food being prepared by Chef Leon be poisoned.

Larry and Amy interrupt the mayor during an interview with their evidence, but the mayor explains that Chef Leon was reacting to the mayor's instruction to put French's mustard on the Gunn's chicken piccata, an act that the insulted Chef Leon viewed as a metaphorical act of "poisoning" to his life's work. When Larry speaks to Chef Leon over the phone, Chef Leon corroborates this interpretation. As a result, Tatlock fires Larry.

Despondent, Larry visits his old friend Big Shug, but ends up alienating him as well. Heading over to his romantic interest, Jane's house, Larry sees she and her mother are enjoying a friendly social visit by the mayor. Jane later reveals that she was trying to get some incriminating facts and received his email callsign "BigBaller23", Larry recognized the name from Lily Micelli's email and resolves to solve the poisoning crimes. He confronts Mayor Gunn, who reveals that Lily Micelli, the owner of Micelli's restaurant, had him make sure that Larry was assigned to the poisonings case, now aware that only he and Jane got sick from eating there that night. Larry and Amy realize that Micelli did this so to ensure that case was investigated incompetently, as she is the one behind the poisonings, while assuminng Big Shug would be an easy opponent on Top Chef. During the cook-off competition, Micelli's loses the first round and while Lily was speaking to her sister, Brenda, unaware that her wire was activated, Larry and Amy expose Micelli's culpability with a plot to sabotage Big Shug during the competition. Both sisters were arrested while Jack Dabbs, the wheelchair desk clerk from the office, was discovered to be working for the Micelli's and made a run for it, revealing his handicap to be a fake, but was stopped by Larry's semi-retarded neighbor, Donnie.

== Cast ==
- Dan Whitney (Larry the Cable Guy) as Larry, the Health Inspector
- Iris Bahr as Amelia “Amy” Butlin
- Megyn Price as Jane Whitley
- Lisa Lampanelli as Jane's mother
- Brooke Dillman as Brenda
- David Koechner as Donnie
- Kid Rock as himself
- Joanna Cassidy as Lily Micelli
- Joe Pantoliano as Mayor Maurice T. Gunn
- Tony Hale as Jack Dabbs
- Bruce Bruce as Big Shug
- Thomas F. Wilson as Bart Tatlock (credited as Tom Wilson)
- Jerry Mathers as himself

== Production ==
In March 2005, Paramount Home Entertainment signed Parallel Entertainment Pictures to a multiyear first-look deal involving six straight-to-DVD programs involving the Blue Collar Comedy Tour, including the in development Larry the Cable Guy: Health Inspector. Paramount set the film for a March 31 theatrical release in December of 2005, before exchanging the release to Lionsgate in February 2006.

== Box office ==
The film earned $15,680,099 at the American box office.

== Reception ==
On the review aggregator website Rotten Tomatoes, 5% of 38 critics' reviews are positive, with an average rating of 2.7/10. The website's consensus reads: "An aggressively lowbrow vehicle for its titular star, this gross-out comedy fails to "git-r-done."" Metacritic, which uses a weighted average, assigned the film a score of 21 out of 100, based on 14 critics, indicating "generally unfavorable" reviews. Audiences polled by CinemaScore gave the film an average grade "B+" on an A+ to F scale. Rotten Tomatoes ranked Larry The Cable Guy: Health Inspector #85 on its "The 100 Worst Reviewed Films of All Time: 2000-2009" list.

Joe Leydon of Variety wrote: "Entirely comfortable as the crude character he has honed in countless stand-up routines and TV appearances, Larry the Cable Guy sustains a level of likeability that enables him to get away with a lot more than he has any right to. But, he remains very much an acquired taste." J. R. Jones of the Chicago Reader wrote: "Though some of his one-liners are pretty good, his shtick can't sustain this dutifully scripted comedy."

== Awards ==
The film was nominated for one Golden Raspberry Award, Larry the Cable Guy was nominated in the "Worst Actor" category.

== Home media ==
The film was released on DVD on August 8, 2006.
