= Tailgate Party (album) =

Studio album by Larry the Cable Guy
- Released: September 22, 2009
- Recorded: July 4, 2009
- Venue: Memorial Stadium (Lincoln, Nebraska)
- Genre: Comedy
- Length: 52:38
- Label: Warner Bros.
- Producer: Larry the Cable Guy; J. P. Williams

Larry the Cable Guy chronology
On the Can (2009)	Tailgate Party (2009)	The Best of Larry the Cable Guy (2010)

Professional ratings
Review scores
Source	Rating
Allmusic	3.5/5 stars

Tailgate Party is an album by American comedian Larry the Cable Guy. It was released by Warner Bros. Records on September 22, 2009. The album peaked at number 1 on the Billboard Top Comedy Albums chart. The album was recorded live at the University of Nebraska–Lincoln's Memorial Stadium in front of over 50,000 people.

== Track listing ==
All material written by Larry the Cable Guy.

1. "Tailgate Party" – 3:59
2. "Prostate Professional" – 3:47
3. "Half Cocked" – 3:59
4. "Boob Tube" – 4:15
5. "Truck Talk" – 3:53
6. "Male Enhancement" – 5:58
7. "Global Warming" – 3:41
8. "Wife Swap" – 3:38
9. "Mother's Milk" – 4:09
10. "Hot Dog Whisperer" – 4:00
11. "Bad Ventriloquist" – 4:09
12. "Buying in Bulk" – 2:22
13. "Silly Songs and So Long" – 4:48

== Chart performance ==
Chart (2009)	Peak position
U.S. Billboard Top Comedy Albums	1
U.S. Billboard Top Country Albums	19
U.S. Billboard 200	71
