= Lord, I Apologize =

Live album by Larry the Cable Guy
- Released: October 30, 2001
- Recorded: June 21, 2001
- Genre: Comedy
- Length: 44:34
- Label: Hip-O
- Producer: Doug Grau, J.P. Williams, Mark Samanski

Larry the Cable Guy chronology
Lord, I Apologize (2001)	A Very Larry Christmas (2004)

Lord, I Apologize is an album by American comedian Larry the Cable Guy. It was released on October 30, 2001 on Hip-O Records, and has been certified gold by the RIAA. As of 2014, sales in the United States have exceeded 883,000 copies, according to Nielsen SoundScan.

Professional ratings
Review scores
Source	Rating
Allmusic	link

== Track listing ==
1. "I Made the Big Time Now" – 2:52
2. "Looking Good at the Flea Market" – 3:15
3. "Couldn't Keep the Pizza Lit" – 2:23
4. "No Hair—Just a Red Head" – 3:29
5. "Keep the Chips Fresh" – 4:06
6. "Jump Up in the Air and Get Stuck" – 3:28
7. "Let Me Eat Your Shorts" – 4:07
8. "Can't Understand My Accent" – 1:43
9. "The Worst Dentist I've Been To" – 1:53
10. "Martians Got a Thing for Redneck Fellers" – 5:00
11. "Going in Circles for Two Hours" – 4:53
12. "People Like My Analogies" – 2:59
13. "Toddler Mail" – 3:27
14. "Lord, I Apologize" – 3:30
  - Musical track, featuring Mark Tremonti

== Chart performance ==
Chart (2003)	Peak position
U.S. Billboard Top Comedy Albums	1
U.S. Billboard Top Country Albums	53

== Certifications ==
Region	Certification	Certified units/sales
United States (RIAA)	Gold	500,000^{^}
^{^} Shipments figures based on certification alone.
