= Memorial Stadium (Lincoln) =

American football stadium in Lincoln, Nebraska, U.S.

Coordinates: 40°49′14″N 96°42′20″W

- "The Sea of Red"
- Memorial Stadium in 2026
- Interactive map of Memorial Stadium
- Full name: Tom Osborne Field at Memorial Stadium
- Address: 600 Stadium Drive; Lincoln, Nebraska, U.S.
- Elevation: 1,150 feet (350 m)
- Owner: University of Nebraska–Lincoln
- Operator: University of Nebraska–Lincoln
- Capacity: 85,458 (2017–present) List: 31,080 (1923–1963); 44,829 (1964); 50,807 (1965); 62,644 (1966); 64,170 (1967–1971); 73,650 (1972–1993); 72,700 (1994–1998); 74,056 (1999); 73,918 (2000–2005); 81,067 (2006–2012); 87,147 (2013–2014); 86,047 (2015–2016)
- Type: Stadium
- Surface: Hellas Matrix Helix (2025-Present) FieldTurf (1999–2025); AstroTurf (1970–1998); Natural grass (1923–1969)
- Record attendance: 92,003 (volleyball – Aug. 30, 2023); 91,585 (football – Sep. 20, 2014)

Construction
- Groundbreaking: April 26, 1923
- Opened: October 13, 1923 (103 years ago)
- Renovated: 1967, 1994, 2000, 2026 (planned)
- Expanded: 1964, 1965, 1966, 1972, 1999, 2006, 2013
- Cost: $482,939 (original structure) ($9.13 million in 2025)
- Architects: John Latenser Sr. Ellery L. Davis
- Project manager: Earl Hawkins
- Structural engineers: Meyer & Jolly
- General contractor: Parsons Construction

Tenants
- Nebraska Cornhuskers football (NCAA / FBS) (1923–present)

Website
- huskers.com/memorial-stadium

Memorial Stadium" is an American football stadium on the campus of the University of Nebraska–Lincoln in Lincoln, Nebraska. It primarily serves as the home venue of the Nebraska Cornhuskers football team and hosts the university's spring commencement ceremony.

The university began planning a new stadium complex shortly after World War I to replace Nebraska Field, an outdated venue that housed the program from 1909 to 1922. After a lengthy fundraising campaign and several design iterations, construction began in mid-1923. The unfinished Memorial Stadium opened on October 13, 1923, dedicated to honor Nebraskans who served in the American Civil War, the Spanish–American War, and World War I. The stadium was built with grandstands along its east and west sidelines; its capacity of 31,080 was unchanged until end zone bleachers were installed decades later. Major expansions of East, West, and North Stadium between 1999 and 2013 raised capacity to 85,458 and completely enclosed the original superstructure, which remains largely intact. Attendance regularly exceeded 90,000 in the past, though proposed future renovations will likely reduce capacity.

Nebraska has sold out 417 consecutive games at Memorial Stadium, an NCAA record for any sport that dates to 1962. In 2023, Memorial Stadium hosted Volleyball Day in Nebraska – the announced attendance of 92,003 was a stadium record and the highest ever recorded for a women's sporting event. The venue's listed capacity of 85,458 is thirteenth-highest among collegiate stadiums and twenty-fifth worldwide. Memorial Stadium is often listed among the best venues in college football.

== Planning and construction ==
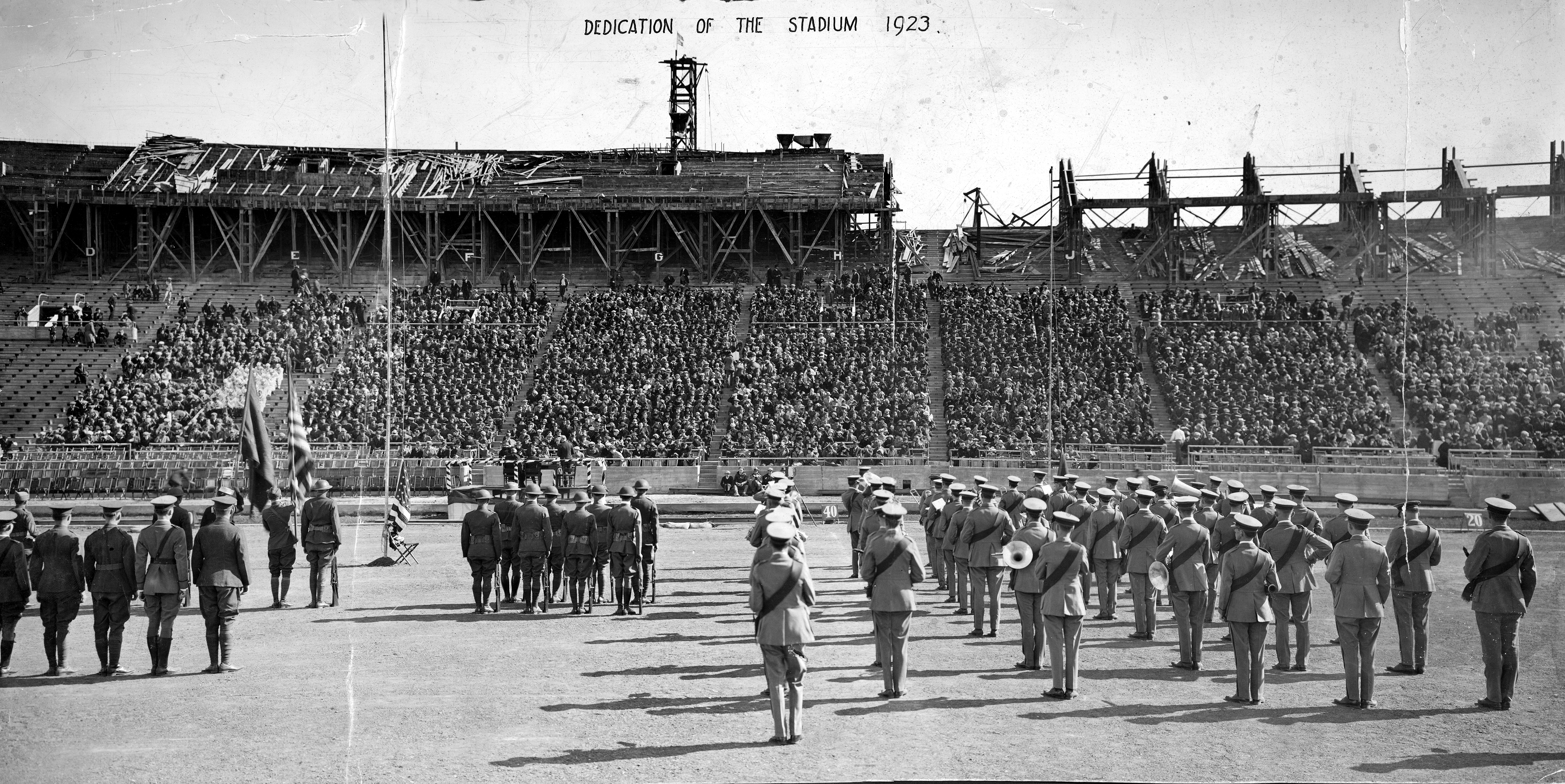
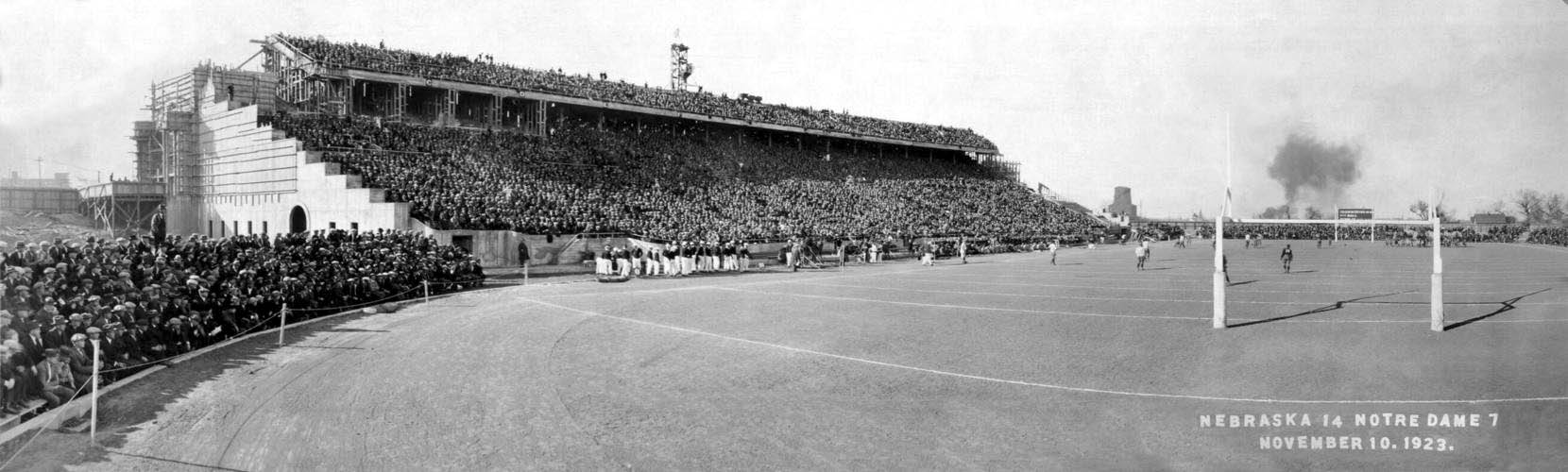
(Above) The dedication of Memorial Stadium on Oct. 20, 1923; (below) fans fill Memorial Stadium's unfinished west grandstand on Nov. 10, 1923

In 1909, the University of Nebraska constructed Nebraska Field on the corner of North 10th and T Streets in downtown Lincoln, the school's first permanent football venue. Nebraska Field's wooden bleachers and limited seating capacity meant that after less than ten years there was significant momentum toward the building of a larger steel-and-concrete stadium. The abrupt departure of highly successful head coach Ewald O. Stiehm and American entry into World War I delayed the project, but when the war ended in 1918, with "the present athletic field as inadequate now as the old one was in 1907," the university began planning a new stadium on the Nebraska Field site.

College football exploded in popularity after the war and enthusiasm for a new stadium was high, with many suggesting it be named for former team captain Roscoe Rhodes, who was killed in France in 1918. The Nebraska Memorial Association was formed to fund and plan the "Nebraska Soldiers and Sailors Memorial," a million-dollar stadium complex that included a gymnasium, a museum, veterans' facilities, and extravagant Roman-style colonnades wrapping around the north and south end zones. The state set aside $250,000 for the project and another $150,000 was gathered from students and faculty, who were encouraged to "give until it hurts." Each county in the state was assigned a fundraising target based on its alumni population. The pledge drive received public backing and financial support from several notable alumni: John J. Pershing, commander of the American Expeditionary Forces who was the highest-ranking general in United States Armed Forces history; Cy Sherman, a sportswriter and future founder of college football's AP poll; and Kārlis Ulmanis, then-Prime Minister (and future dictator) of Latvia.

An agricultural depression through the early 1920s forced the state to back out of its commitment, and fundraising difficulties and local resistance meant most extraneous elements of the stadium project were scaled back or removed (a gymnasium, the Nebraska Coliseum, was constructed three years later). John Latenser Sr. of Omaha and Ellery L. Davis of Lincoln were selected as head architects as they offered to work pro bono, a significant boost to the cash-strapped Memorial Association. A ceremonial groundbreaking was held on April 23, 1923 when the fundraising target of $430,000 had been met, but higher-than-expected contractor bids pushed the price tag over $540,000 and required further design revisions. After taking out a $300,000 loan to cover pledges that remained unpaid, the Memorial Association accepted a $482,939 bid from Parsons Construction Company.

The contract between Parsons and the university required the stadium to be ready for the upcoming 1923 season, reflecting assurances made by the Memorial Association during fundraising. Parsons' employment of university students and prospective football players during construction was applauded by NU chancellor Samuel Avery. Work continued through a rainy summer and an August tornado, and was mostly complete in time for Nebraska's first home game, though lead builder Earl Hawkins insisted fans not be allowed into the unfinished upper sections. On October 13, Nebraska defeated Oklahoma 24–0 in the first game at the new stadium; it was played on dirt as the grass field had yet to be installed. (Note: Nebraska was forced into blue practice jerseys when Oklahoma mistakenly brought its home reds to Lincoln. NU wore blue-trimmed uniforms to honor Memorial Stadium's hundredth anniversary in 2023.) The venue was formally dedicated a week later as "Memorial Stadium" to honor Nebraskans who served in the American Civil War, the Spanish–American War, and World War I. (Note: The dedication was later expanded to include Nebraskans who served in all American wars.)

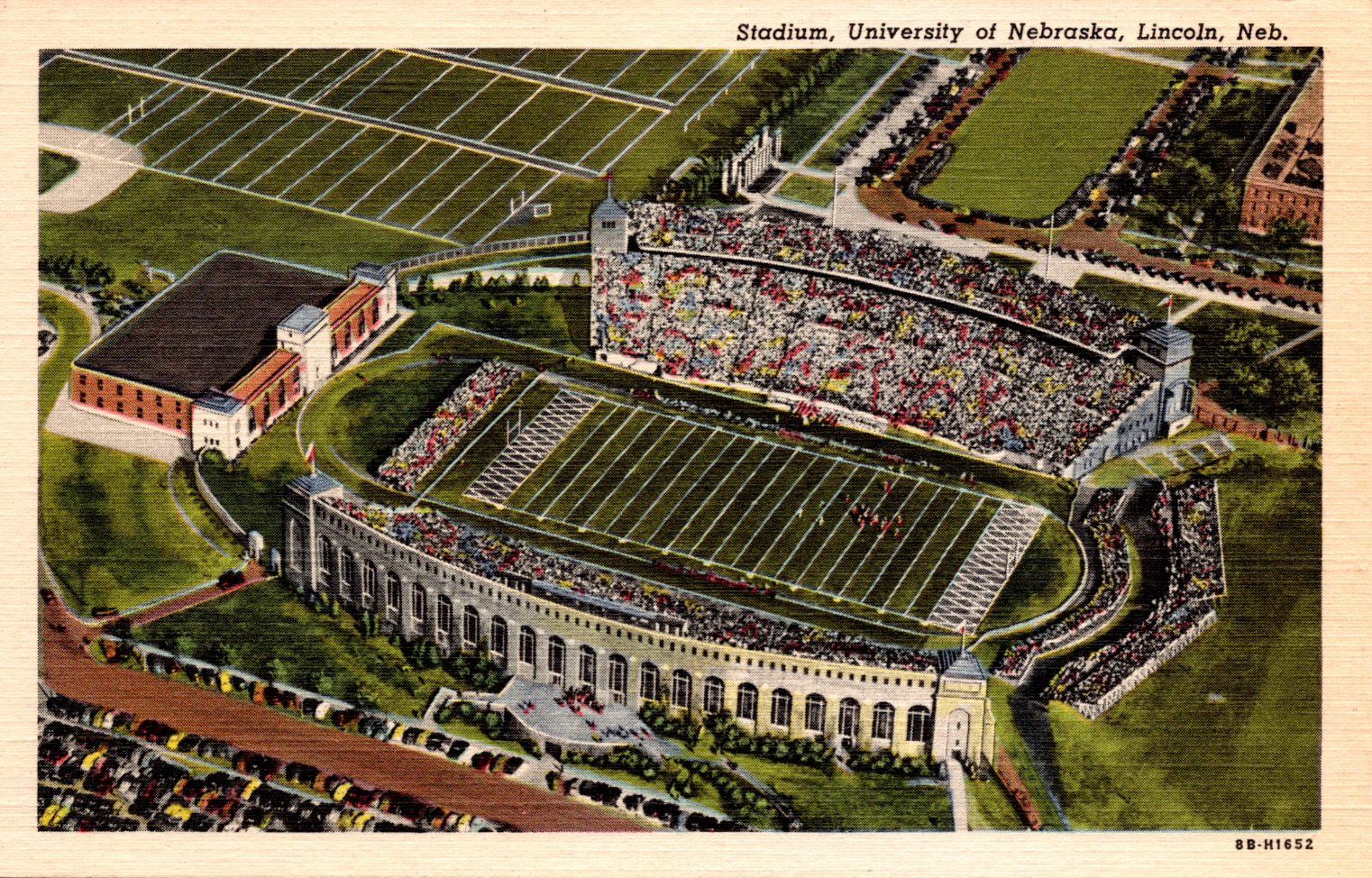
An illustrated birds-eye view of Memorial Stadium, c. 1948

In its original layout, the stadium was oriented north-to-south (Nebraska Field had been oriented east-to-west) with open end zones and grandstands along the east and west sidelines. A quarter-mile track surrounded the playing field. Each corner of the stadium was given an inscription from philosophy professor Hartley Burr Alexander:

- Southeast: "In commemoration of the men of Nebraska who served and fell in the nations wars."
- Southwest: "Not the victory but the action; not the goal but the game; in the deed the glory."
- Northwest: "Courage; generosity; fairness; honor; in these are the true awards of manly sport."
- Northeast: "Their lives they held their country's trust; they kept its faith; they died its heroes."

== Expansions ==
Memorial Stadium's first significant expansion was in 1964, when permanent seats were added to the south end zone, turning the stadium into a 44,829-seat horseshoe. The north end zone was enclosed in two stages from 1965 to 1966, raising capacity to 62,644, over double what it was two years prior. A new press box was constructed in 1967, replacing a "shoebox" that was among the country's worst press facilities – the $500,000 project was financed by selling VIP seating for the first time. The south end zone was expanded further in 1972, raising capacity to 73,650.

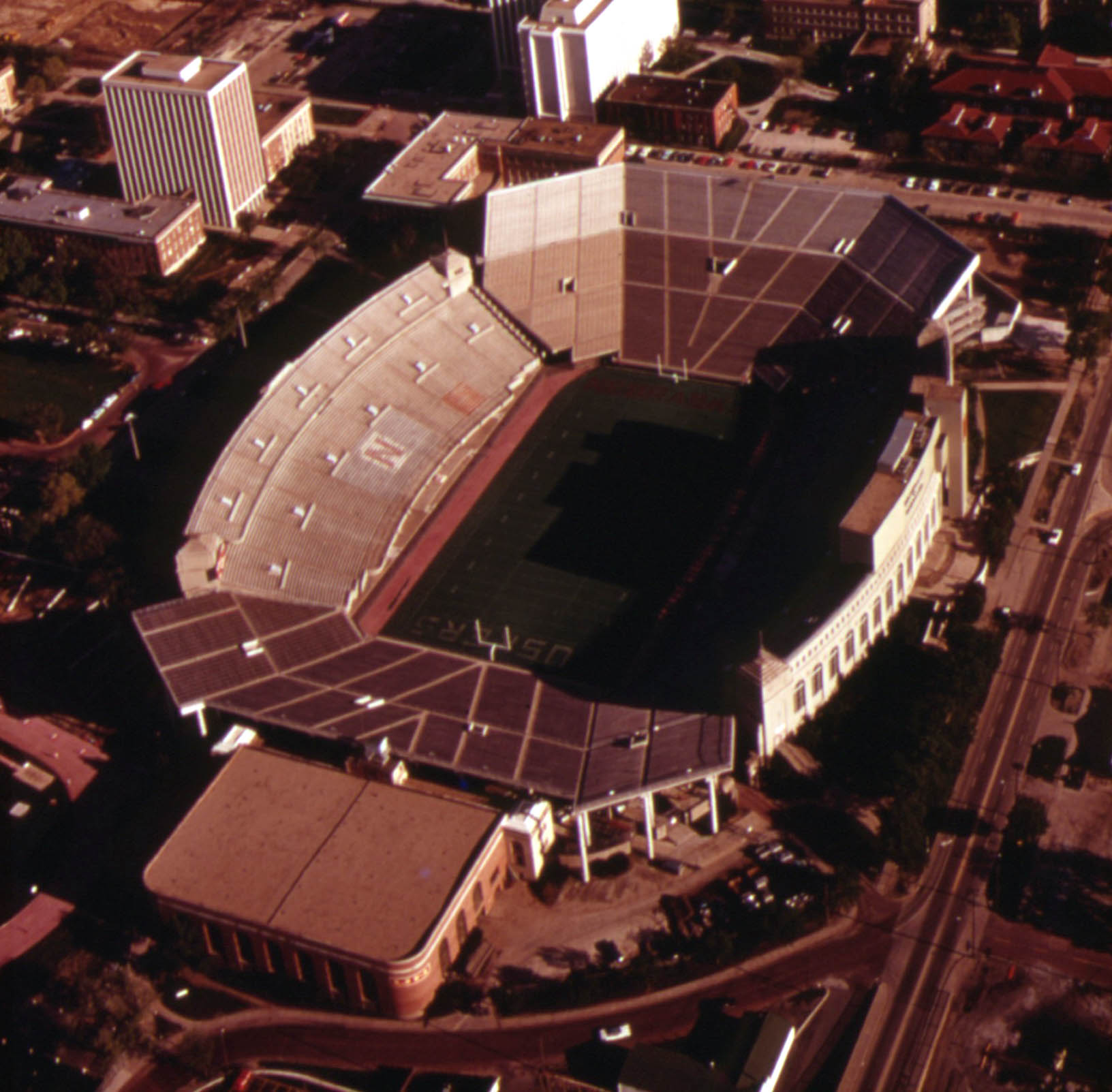
Memorial Stadium in 1973

In the early 1980s, portable lighting was occasionally used to allow Nebraska to host late afternoon games, typically on Black Friday against rival Oklahoma. The first night game at Memorial Stadium was a 34–17 victory over Florida State on September 6, 1986, after which Bobby Bowden swore off any further trips to Lincoln. Permanent lighting was not installed until 1999.

In May 1993, a 439-seat section collapsed into Memorial Stadium's southwest tunnel. This section was originally designed to be removable so NU could host track meets (the track encompassing the playing field was still usable but had long been hidden from view by bleachers); though nobody was injured, athletic director Bill Byrne admitted the university had done a poor job maintaining its facilities and ordered more frequent structural examinations. Subsequent inspections revealed Memorial Stadium not been properly inspected in twelve years and identified over thirty areas to be addressed, though the venue was still considered structurally sound.

The playing surface was dedicated as "Tom Osborne Field" in 1998, months after Osborne's retirement from coaching. The following year, Nebraska finished a $36-million expansion of West Stadium – additions included a new press box and a large concrete facade overlooking Stadium Drive and Interstate 180. The north end zone was renovated and expanded in 2006, adding six thousand seats and thirteen luxury boxes to raise capacity to 81,067.

In 2010 the university polled fans about a proposed East Stadium project – the most-supported option was a modest seating expansion designed to protect Nebraska's NCAA-record sellout streak. The $65-million project was completed in 2013, adding over six thousand new seats and increasing capacity to 87,147. It included Memorial Stadium's first standing room-only section and two 20,000-square-foot (1,900 m^{2}) research facilities, one dedicated to athletics and one to campus research. The original East Stadium superstructure was preserved within an entrance lobby, with a statue of former head coach Bob Devaney in front of the new facade.

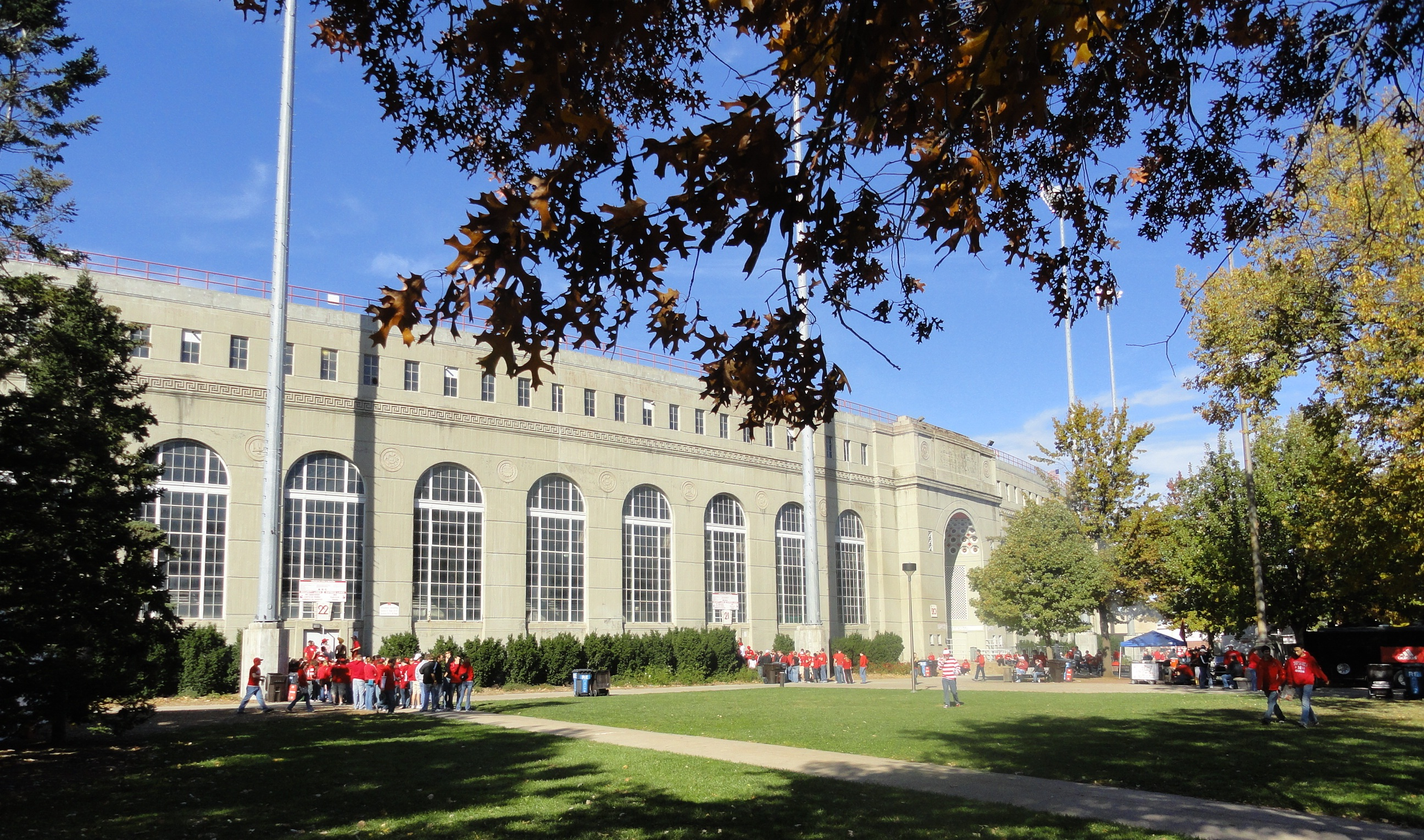
East facade of Memorial Stadium in 2011, prior to being enclosed during the stadium's 2013 expansion

Memorial Stadium has undergone only minor updates since the 2013 expansion, designed to improve fan comfort and experience. A public Wi-Fi network and extra videoboards were installed, with two screens wrapping around the existing structure to allow visibility for fans in North Stadium seated under the primary videoboard. Bleacher seats were widened from eighteen to twenty-two inches in several areas, reducing capacity to 85,458. A brick pattern was added to the base of West Stadium to match the appearance of the rest of the stadium and surrounding academic buildings.

In 2023, Nebraska unveiled plans for a $450-million reconstruction of South Stadium, which has never undergone any extensive renovation. The project would include a 360-degree main concourse and a 270-degree upper concourse, with a significant capacity reduction due to the replacement of bench seating in East and West Stadium with larger chair-back seats. In 2024, the renovation was reexamined and delayed in light of budget projections following a proposed NCAA settlement allowing revenue sharing between schools and student-athletes. To help alleviate a university-wide budget deficit and fund the project, regent Barbara Weitz jokingly suggested constructing a columbarium beneath the football field.

The revised project, officially approved in April 2026 at an estimated $600 million, is scheduled for completion in 2028. It maintains most elements of the initial plan laid out in 2023 and will result in the loss of approximately 5,000 seats.

=== Seating capacity ===
- 1923: 31,080
- 1964: 44,829 – south end zone bleachers erected
- 1965: 50,807 – center section of north end zone bleachers erected
- 1966: 62,644 – north stadium bleachers finished
- 1967: 64,170 – new press box and suites
- 1972: 73,650 – south end zone bleachers extended
- 1994: 72,700 – handicapped seating installed
- 1999: 74,056 – new West Stadium press box, skyboxes, and club seating
- 2000: 73,918 – additional club seating
- 2006: 81,067 – North Stadium bleachers extended, additional skyboxes and handicap seating
- 2013: 87,147 – East Stadium expanded
- 2015: 86,047 – north end zone seats widened, some seats removed for addition of crowd-control aisle
- 2017: 85,458 – seats widened throughout stadium

== Additional facilities ==
North Stadium and the Husker Athletic Complex in 2010

Memorial Stadium was largely unchanged for over a decade after its 1923 opening. By the mid-1930s the university began planning additional facilities along the stadium's north end zone, but Great Depression financial struggles made it difficult to acquire the necessary land in adjoining neighborhoods. Excavation for a standalone football facility began in 1939, aided by funding from the Work Projects Administration. The building was partially complete when progress was halted by American entry into World War II, but was far enough along that the locker rooms could be used. The Schulte Fieldhouse was completed in 1949, featuring a large analog clock overlooking Memorial Stadium's north end zone that was among the first crowd-facing game clocks in college football. The building was named for former football and track and field coach Henry Schulte, who died in 1944 while construction was paused.

The Schulte Fieldhouse was used by the program until 2004. It was razed to make room for the Osborne Athletic Complex (now the Husker Athletic Complex), a $50-million locker room, strength and conditioning, and administrative facility constructed adjacent to Nebraska's indoor practice facility, the Hawks Championship Center. A statue of Osborne and Brook Berringer, a Goodland, Kansas native and former backup quarterback who was killed in a 1996 plane crash, was installed at the main entrance of the complex.

Barely a decade after completing the Osborne Athletic Complex, Nebraska's football facilities already lagged behind other major programs in terms of size and amenities. In 2024, the university finished the Osborne Legacy Complex, a $165-million, 315,000-square-foot facility and moved the bulk of its athletic operations to the standalone complex just northeast of Memorial Stadium.

== Playing surface ==
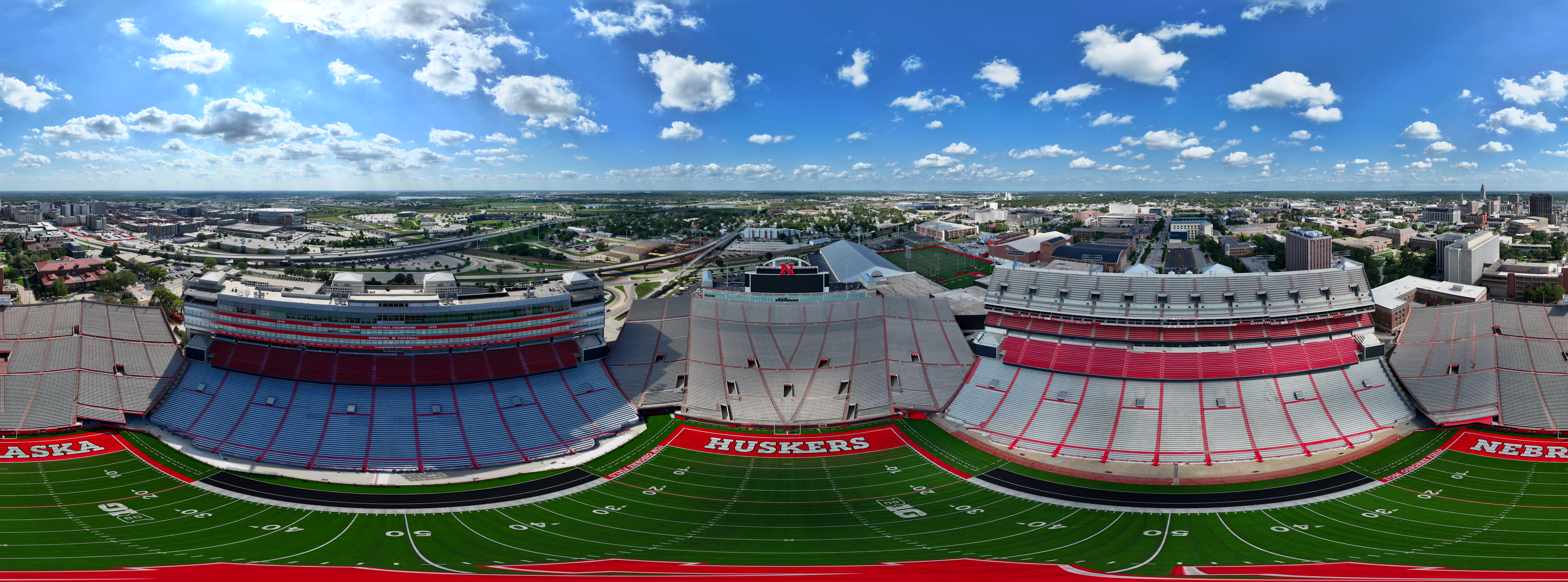
A panoramic view of Memorial Stadium and surrounding area, August 2025.

The first game at Memorial Stadium was played on dirt as the natural grass field had yet to be installed. Nebraska played on grass until 1970, when the stadium was fit with AstroTurf, an artificial turf surface glued to a foam-like plastic layer on a six-inch (15 cm) bed of asphalt that was made famous when it was installed at the Houston Astrodome in 1966. The $250,000 AstroTurf project was part of head coach and athletic director Bob Devaney's efforts to improve athletic facilities across the university. Devaney and Osborne used the outfield at Buck Beltzer Stadium, home of NU's baseball team, to conduct practices for upcoming road games to be played on grass. This meant the stadium could not have a warning track or permanent fence, and left divots that made fielding ground balls extremely difficult (termed "the bounce of the Buck").

Several iterations of AstroTurf were used at Memorial Stadium until 1999, when Nebraska became the first Division I-A program to install FieldTurf, a lighter synthetic surface designed to more closely replicate natural grass. The FieldTurf surface has been replaced three times, sometimes featuring an alternating light-and-dark green pattern every five yards.

- 1923–1969: natural grass (Note: The first game at Memorial Stadium was played on dirt as its grass surface had yet to be installed.)
- 1970–1983: AstroTurf
- 1984–1991: All-Pro Turf
- 1992–1998: AstroTurf-9
- 1999–present: FieldTurf

== Traditions ==
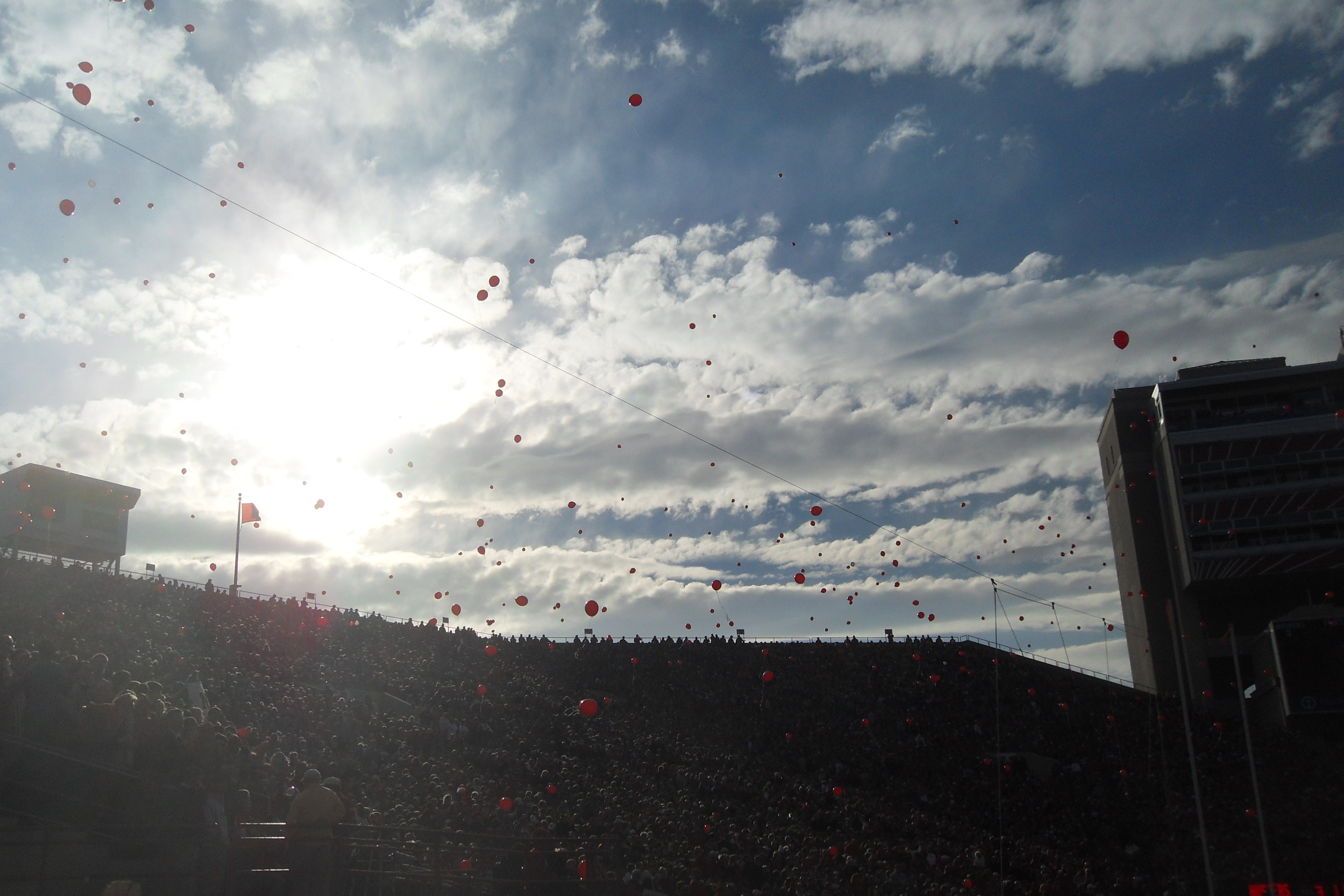
Fans release red helium balloons to celebrate a Nebraska field goal on Nov. 17, 2012

Since 1993, Nebraska's home games have opened with the "Tunnel Walk" as the team takes the field before kickoff, typically to the Alan Parsons Project instrumental "Sirius." The team historically emerged from the southwest corner of the field; the entrance moved to the northwest corner upon completion of the Osborne Athletic Complex in 2006, and again to the northeast corner when the home locker room was moved to the Osborne Legacy Complex in 2023. The Tunnel Walk is preceded by a "Husker Power" chant – half the stadium chants "Husker" in unison and the other half responds with "Power."

Fans at Memorial Stadium have released red helium balloons when Nebraska scores its first points since the 1960s, though the tradition was seen as early as 1932. Global helium shortages and environmental concerns in recent years have threatened the tradition, which was paused in 2012 and 2022.

The Memorial Stadium crowd has historically applauded the visiting team when they exit the field, regardless of the game's outcome.

== Attendance ==
Nebraska has sold out 417 consecutive games at Memorial Stadium, an NCAA record for any sport that dates to 1962. NU dominated at Memorial Stadium for much of the sellout streak under Bob Devaney, Tom Osborne, and Frank Solich, including a forty-seven-game home winning streak from 1991 to 1998 that is among the longest in college football history. The streak has traditionally been a source of pride for the program and its supporters, but has been criticized following Solich's 2003 firing as Nebraska has occasionally struggled to fill Memorial Stadium and been forced to sell bulk tickets to donors and sponsors to keep the streak alive. NU's record during the streak is 330–80.

Most of the stadium's attendance records were set shortly after the completion of an East Stadium expansion in 2013; capacity was decreased in 2015 due to the widening of some bleacher seats. The highest-attended non-athletic event at Memorial Stadium was an August 14, 2021 Garth Brooks concert with nearly 90,000 in attendance.

Memorial Stadium has hosted ESPN College GameDay seven times; in 2001, Nebraska set a GameDay attendance record that stood for nine years. Nebraska's student section, nicknamed "The Boneyard" after the team's starting defensive unit, is located in the southeast corner of East and South Stadium.

Highest-attended events at Memorial Stadium
No.	Attendance	Date	Winning team		Losing team		Event type
1	92,003	Aug. 30, 2023	No. 4 Nebraska	3	Omaha	0	College volleyball
2	91,585	Sept. 20, 2014	No. 24 Nebraska	41	Miami (FL)	31	College football
3	91,471	Sept. 14, 2013	No. 16 UCLA	41	No. 23 Nebraska	21	College football
4	91,441	Aug. 30, 2014	No. 22 Nebraska	55	FAU	7	College football
5	91,414	Sept. 17, 2016	Nebraska	35	No. 22 Oregon	32	College football
6	91,255	Sept. 27, 2014	No. 21 Nebraska	45	Illinois	14	College football
7	91,186	Nov. 22, 2014	Minnesota	28	No. 21 Nebraska	24	College football
8	91,185	Aug. 31, 2013	No. 18 Nebraska	37	Wyoming	34	College football
9	91,140	Nov. 2, 2013	Nebraska	27	Northwestern	24	College football
10	91,107	Nov. 1, 2014	No. 17 Nebraska	35	Purdue	14	College football

== Other events ==
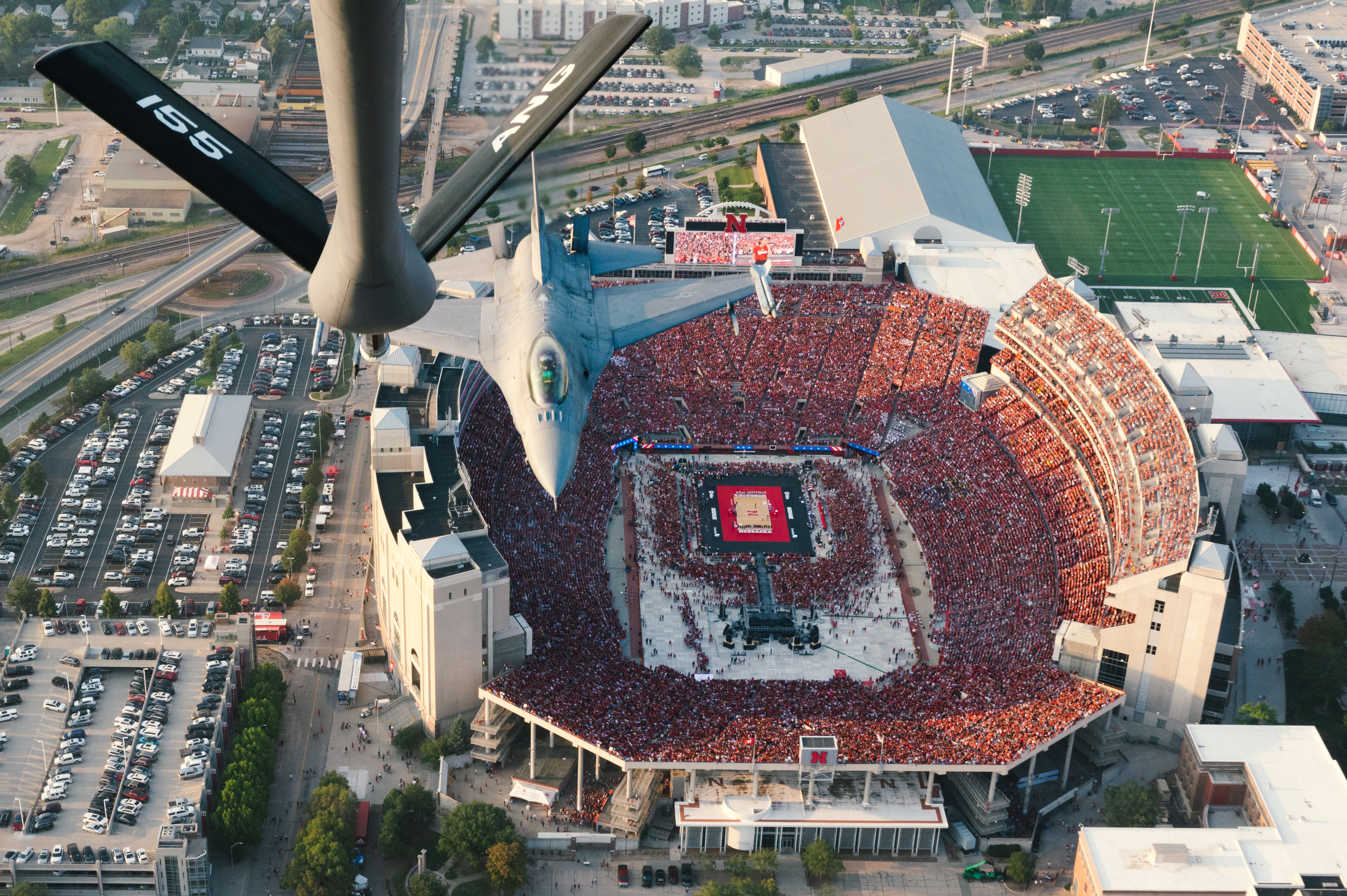
A KC-135 Stratotanker of the Nebraska Air National Guard and an F-16 Fighting Falcon of the South Dakota Air National Guard conduct a pregame flyover during Volleyball Day in Nebraska on Aug. 30, 2023.

=== High school football ===
Since 1996, Memorial Stadium has hosted most of the Nebraska School Activities Association's high school football state championship games. This includes some of the smaller schools that play eight-man football on fields smaller than standard size; the state's six-man football championship finals, as well as the finals for one division of eight-man football, are played at the University of Nebraska at Kearney's Cope Stadium. Prior to moving to Memorial Stadium, finals for each class were hosted by one of the schools playing in the championship game.

=== Baseball ===
In June 2026, the Savannah Bananas and Savannah Firefighters, of the Banana Ball Championship League, played a game in Memorial Stadium two days after a game at Haymarket Park.

=== Volleyball ===
On August 30, 2023, Memorial Stadium hosted Volleyball Day in Nebraska, a two-game event which featured three schools from the University of Nebraska system and one from the Nebraska State College System. Division II Nebraska–Kearney met Wayne State before Nebraska defeated Omaha in front of a crowd of 92,003. It was the largest attendance ever recorded at a women's sporting event, breaking a record set the year prior in a UEFA Women's Champions League game between FC Barcelona Femení and VfL Wolfsburg. (Note: The match between Nebraska and Omaha set a world record for the highest recorded attendance at a women's sporting event. Some attendance estimates for the 1971 Women's World Cup final between Denmark and Mexico at the Estadio Azteca are as high as 110,000, but no official number was recorded.)

The court was set up on the north side of the field but tickets were sold throughout the stadium; the addition of field-level tickets allowed the event to set a Memorial Stadium attendance record.

=== Concerts ===
Memorial Stadium has historically hosted few non-athletic events, though the school has expressed interest in finding ways to make use of the venue year-round.

Memorial Stadium hosted Farm Aid III on September 19, 1987, days after second-ranked Nebraska defeated No. 3 UCLA in Lincoln. The ten-hour event, highlighted by Farm Aid organizers John Mellencamp, Willie Nelson, and Neil Young, also included performances by John Denver, Vince Gill, and Joe Walsh. It was attended by over 60,000 people and raised $1.7 million for farmers struggling during the 1980s farm crisis.

Comedian Dan Whitney, performing as Larry the Cable Guy, recorded his 2009 album Tailgate Party in front of 52,000 fans at Memorial Stadium.

Country music star Garth Brooks performed at Memorial Stadium in 2021, an event that served as "experiment" to test the stadium's capacity to serve alcohol. Nebraska approved the sale of beer at football games in 2025, the last Big Ten university to do so. Scotty McCreery performed following Volleyball Day in Nebraska on August 30, 2023, noting it was the largest crowd he had ever played to. McCreery's Memorial Stadium performance was featured in the music video for his single "Cab in a Solo."

== In popular culture ==
Memorial Stadium featured prominently in the 2005 NBC reality television miniseries Tommy Lee Goes to College, in which Mötley Crüe drummer Tommy Lee attends the university. Lee is seen conducting the Cornhusker Marching Band during halftime of Nebraska's 2004 game against Baylor.

The 2008 romantic comedy Yes Man features multiple in-game shots of Memorial Stadium. The footage, ostensibly of a game against Oklahoma, was recorded during Nebraska's 2007 loss to Oklahoma State. Close-ups of stars Jim Carrey and Zooey Deschanel cheering for the Cornhuskers were shot at the Los Angeles Memorial Coliseum.
