= Only in America with Larry the Cable Guy =

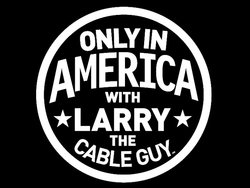
- Genre: Travel documentary
- Starring: Larry the Cable Guy
- Country of origin: United States
- Original language: English
- No. of seasons: 3
- No. of episodes: 50

Production
- Executive producers: Craig Piligian; Eddie Rohwedder; J.P. Williams; Larry the Cable Guy; Susan Werbe
- Running time: 42 minutes
- Production companies: Parallel Entertainment; Pilgrim Studios

Original release
- Network: History
- Release: February 8, 2011 – August 28, 2013

Only in America with Larry the Cable Guy is an American travel documentary series that aired for three seasons from 2011 to 2013 on History. It premiered on February 8, 2011.

== Premise ==
In the series, Larry the Cable Guy travels America and experiences a variety of different life styles that occur "only in America" – the comedian explores the country, immersing himself in different lifestyles, jobs and hobbies.

Each episode starts with Larry saying:

Listen up, America. I'm Larry the Cable Guy, and I love this country. So I had this idea to find out all the things that make this country great. The people, the history, the way we do things. Only in America.

== Series overview ==
Season	Episodes	Originally released	
Season	Episodes	First released	Last released
1	21	February 8, 2011	July 12, 2011
2	13	January 11, 2012	April 4, 2012
3	16	May 8, 2013	August 28, 2013

== Episodes ==
=== Season 1 (2011) ===
No. overall	No. in season	Title	Original release date	U.S. viewers (millions)
1	1	"Larry Makes Moonshine"	February 8, 2011	4.10
2	2	"Larry Goes to the Swamp"	February 15, 2011	3.05
3	3	"Larry Shoots Guns"	February 22, 2011	2.76
4	4	"Larry Gets the Horns"	February 22, 2011	2.62
5	5	"Larry Breeds Mules"	March 1, 2011	N/A
6	6	"Larry Races Dogs"	March 1, 2011	N/A
7	7	"Larry Gits a Gator"	March 8, 2011	2.88
8	8	"Larry Goes Trucking"	March 15, 2011	2.67
9	9	"Larry Is an Astronaut"	March 29, 2011	2.10
10	10	"Larry Rides With the Hells Angels"	April 5, 2011	2.16
11	11	"Larry Deep Fries Everything"	April 12, 2011	2.15
12	12	"Larry Digs for Gold"	April 19, 2011	1.83
13	13	"Larry in Hillbilly Country"	May 3, 2011	1.63
14	14	"Larry is a Logger"	May 10, 2011	1.52
15	15	"Larry Goes North"	May 17, 2011	N/A
16	16	"Larry Is the Sheriff"	June 7, 2011	1.54
17	17	"Larry Steps Into the Ring"	June 14, 2011	1.51
18	18	"Larry Is Amish"	June 21, 2011	1.58
19	19	"Larry Beefs Up"	June 28, 2011	1.63
20	20	"Larry Cuts the Cheese"	July 7, 2011	2.30
21	21	"Larry & the Superpig"	July 12, 2011	1.36

=== Season 2 (2012) ===
No. overall	No. in season	Title	Original release date	U.S. viewers (millions)
22	1	"Alaska Road Trip"	January 11, 2012	2.66
23	2	"Mutant All-Beef Road Trip"	January 18, 2012	1.71
24	3	"Extreme American Critters"	January 25, 2012	2.23
25	4	"Naked Cowboys & Reptile Wrangling"	February 1, 2012	2.32
26	5	"American Guns"	February 8, 2012	2.33
27	6	"Redneck Extravaganzas"	February 15, 2012	1.83
28	7	"Larry's Favorite Stuff"	February 22, 2012	2.13
29	8	"America After Dark"	February 29, 2012	1.58
30	9	"Larry Goes to Washington"	March 7, 2012	1.76
31	10	"American Invasion"	March 14, 2012	1.96
32	11	"Kentucky Road Trip"	March 21, 2012	1.59
33	12	"Special Access"	March 28, 2012	1.83
34	13	"Louisiana Road Trip"	April 4, 2012	1.57

=== Season 3 (2013) ===
No. overall	No. in season	Title	Original release date	U.S. viewers (millions)
35	1	"Larry Herds Dinosaurs"	May 8, 2013	1.53
36	2	"Larry vs. the Killer Bees"	May 15, 2013	1.39
37	3	"Larry Gets Lost in Space"	May 22, 2013	1.68
38	4	"Larry Confronts the Apocalypse"	May 29, 2013	1.67
39	5	"Larry Gets Trashed and Tanked"	June 5, 2013	1.45
40	6	"Does Larry Eat Poop?"	June 12, 2013	1.78
41	7	"Larry Crushes the Competition"	June 19, 2013	1.62
42	8	"Larry's Vegas Hangover"	June 26, 2013	1.65
43	9	"Larry Goes Boom"	July 10, 2013	1.70
44	10	"Larry's Beantown Lowdown"	July 17, 2013	1.36
45	11	"Larry Goes Hollyweird"	July 24, 2013	1.34
46	12	"Larry Sees Dead People"	July 31, 2013	1.62
47	13	"Larry Caves In"	August 7, 2013	1.77
48	14	"Larry Squeezes Chicks"	August 14, 2013	1.61
49	15	"Larry Gets Whipped"	August 21, 2013	1.57
50	16	"Larry Becomes Statuesque"	August 28, 2013	1.47
