= Morning Constitutions =

Live album by Larry the Cable Guy
- Released: April 3, 2007
- Recorded: February 2, 2006 Orpheum Theatre Minneapolis
- Genre: Comedy
- Length: 51:13
- Label: Warner Bros. (CD), Image (DVD)
- Producer: J.P. Williams; Allan Blomquist

Larry the Cable Guy chronology
The Right to Bare Arms (2005)	Morning Constitutions (2007)	Christmastime in Larryland (2007)

Professional ratings
Review scores
Source	Rating
Allmusic	3.5/5 stars

Morning Constitutions is a 2007 album by American comedian Larry the Cable Guy. It was recorded at the Orpheum Theatre in Minneapolis, Minnesota. It reached #1 on the Top Comedy Albums chart.

== Track listing ==
All material written by Larry the Cable Guy.

1. "Bowling Shoes"
2. "Just Hitched"
3. "I Like Steak"
4. "Pie of the Month"
5. "Terrorist or Toddler"
6. "Gay Mafia"
7. "Stool Troubles"
8. "Shopping at Wal-Mart"
9. "Bed, Beer & a Blonde"
10. "Squeal or No Squeal"
11. "A Sue Named Boy"
12. "Poop Lasagna"

== Charts ==
=== Weekly charts ===
Chart (2007)	Peak position
US Billboard 200	16
US Top Comedy Albums (Billboard)	1
US Top Country Albums (Billboard)	5

=== Year-end charts ===
Chart (2007)	Position
US Top Comedy Albums (Billboard)	2
US Top Country Albums (Billboard)	49
Chart (2008)	Position
US Top Comedy Albums (Billboard)	9
