= Bruce Bruce =

American comedian and actor (born c. 1961, as Bruce Church)

- Born: Bruce Church; 1960 or 1961 (age 65–66); Atlanta, Georgia, U.S.
- Occupations: Comedian; actor

Comedy career
- Years active: 1980s–present
- Medium: Stand-up; television; film
- Website: www.bruce-bruce.com

Bruce Church (born c. 1961), better known by his stage name Bruce Bruce, is an American comedian and actor.

He hosted BET's ComicView from 2000 to 2002 and has appeared in such films as The Wash (2001), XXX: State of the Union (2005), Idlewild (2006) and Larry the Cable Guy: Health Inspector (2006). In 2005 he became the spokesperson for Popeye's Chicken & Biscuits.

== Early life ==
Born in Atlanta, Georgia, Bruce was the only child of a divorced mother. He grew up in "The Bluff" neighborhood of northwest Atlanta, an area that has a history of crime and poverty.

Bruce was funny from a young age and was a class clown. He looked up to his uncle, Paul, whom he referred to as "the funniest man in the world" during a 2002 interview. As a child he was inspired by comedians such as Flip Wilson and Jackie Gleason, and was later influenced by Richard Pryor, Bill Cosby, Redd Foxx and Milton Berle.

He worked as a barbecue chef, then as a sales person for Frito-Lay, where he was asked to perform comedy during corporate meetings. He took his routine to the Comedy Act Theater in Atlanta before moving to Los Angeles in 1989.

== Career ==
Bruce made his first appearance on HBO's Def Comedy Jam in 1993, which he refers to as his "first big break". He made his Showtime at the Apollo debut the following year.

In 2001 he appeared in the comedy film The Wash in the role of DeWayne, a good-natured security guard. He played the role of Lime Pimp (a pimp wearing a bright green suit), in the 2004 film Hair Show starring Mo'Nique and appeared as himself in the Burt Reynolds film Cloud 9 (2006). In 2012, he played Chubby Man in the romantic comedy Think Like a Man.

He hosted episodes of BET's ComicView between 2000 and 2002 and Coming to the Stage in 2004. Bruce was featured in an episode of Comedy Central Presents in 2003 and released his one-hour comedy special Bruce Bruce Live that same year. He released his one-hour special Losin' It in 2011.

Bruce appeared in the video for the Quad City DJ's 1996 single "C'mon N' Ride It (The Train)". He is mentioned by name in the lyrics of the Ying Yang Twins' their 2003 song "Salt Shaker" and he made an appearance in the video. He has collaborated several times with the Atlanta-based hip-hop duo Outkast: He appeared in the video for the 2001 single "So Fresh, So Clean". In the film Idlewild he played the role of Nathan, the assistant to The Real Angel Davenport, a character played by Patti LaBelle. Bruce also played Golf Ball Eddie, a quick-talking bookie, in Who's Your Caddy? starring Big Boi.

Bruce's tends to avoid topical subjects in his stand-up act, preferring observational topics from everyday life. While he does deal with adult subject matter, Bruce is known for performing with very little profanity.

Bruce is notable for his size. He is 6 feet tall and in 2012 he told The Atlanta Journal-Constitution "I was almost 500 lbs at one point. I'm now down to about 350." He is also known for wearing brightly-colored suits, some of which he designed himself.

== Personal life ==
Bruce was married for 10 years. He and his wife divorced in 1989. He has one daughter and two sons.

He divides his time between Los Angeles and Atlanta, and collects Buick muscle cars.

He published his autobiography Baby James Brown in 2005.

== Filmography ==
- Dollar (2000)
- The Wash (2001)
- The Sunday Morning Stripper (2003)
- Hair Show (2004)
- XXX: State of the Union (2005)
- Larry the Cable Guy: Health Inspector (2006)
- Idlewild (2006)
- Cloud 9 (2006)
- Who's Your Caddy? (2007)
- Think Like a Man (2012)
- Top Five (2014)
- Maron (2015) – Himself (1 episode)
- BET's ComicView
- The Trap (2019)
- Undercover Brother 2 (2019)
