= The Wash (2001 film) =

2001 film directed by DJ Pooh

- Theatrical release poster
- Directed by: DJ Pooh
- Written by: DJ Pooh
- Produced by: Phillip G. Atwell; Rick Freeman; DJ Pooh
- Starring: Snoop Dogg; Dr. Dre
- Cinematography: Keith L. Smith
- Edited by: Jack Hofstra
- Music by: Camara Kambon
- Production companies: Lions Gate Films; Lithium Entertainment Group
- Distributed by: Lions Gate Films
- Release date: November 16, 2001
- Running time: 93 minutes
- Country: United States
- Language: English
- Budget: $7 million
- Box office: $10.2 million

The Wash is a 2001 American comedy film written, produced and directed by DJ Pooh and starring Dr. Dre, Snoop Dogg and DJ Pooh, with appearances by Eminem, Ludacris, Kurupt, Shaquille O'Neal, Xzibit and Pauly Shore. It was released on November 16, 2001.

== Plot ==
Sean (Dr. Dre) and Dee Loc (Snoop Dogg) are roommates who have not paid their rent, and their landlord's given them a 3-day eviction notice. To make matters worse, Sean has just lost his job at Foot Locker due to Dee Loc stealing shoes, and his car has got a boot on it as well, so Dee Loc suggests his roommate stop by the same carwash where he works and apply for work there.

Sean is immediately hired as assistant manager, with Chris (Eminem) having been fired the day before. Though Dee Loc has the full amount for the rent (from dealing drugs on the side), he refuses to pay, insisting Sean needs to be responsible, and come up with his half. Sean does his best to impress Mr. Washington (George Wallace), the owner of the car wash, so he can hold his job long enough to come up with his half of the rent.

At first, things go fine, but then Dee Loc is caught on tape stealing, Mr. Washington tells Sean he must decide what to do, including firing his roommate. Sean tries to help Dee Loc act more responsible, but this creates friction between them. Mr. Washington is kidnapped at gunpoint by two clueless and angry local thugs (one of whom is played by DJ Pooh), who call the carwash with their demands, unaware of caller ID, which reveals their location. Instead of calling police, Sean and Dee Loc put aside their differences long enough to rescue their boss.

The crisis worsens, when former assistant manager, Chris, shows up with an AK-47 wanting revenge on Mr. Washington for firing him. Chris shoots one of the kidnappers then shoots up the car wash, and runs out of ammunition. Sean attacks Chris, but loses the battle, and falls down. Before he could kill Sean, Security officer Dwayne (Bruce Bruce) steps in and handcuffs Chris. When all is over, Sean and Dee Loc walk off, as Sean tells Dee Loc he's trying his best to pay his half of the rent but he first has to take the boot off his car.

== Cast ==
- Dr. Dre as Sean, a mature, responsible, educated man, who works as assistant manager at the car wash.
- Snoop Dogg as "Dee Loc", an irresponsible stoner, troublemaker, and Sean's best friend and roommate.
- George Wallace as Mr. Washington, a gun toting, no nonsense manager of the car wash.
- Tommy Lister Jr. as "Bear", an ex-con who is working at the car wash due to community service from his conviction.
- Lamont Bentley as "C-Money", a twenty year old employee at the car wash, who steals money inside customer's vehicles.
- Rashaan Nall as Ronald, car wash employee
- Alex Thomas as Jimmy, car wash employee
- Demetrius Navarro as Juan, car wash employee
- Truth Hurts as Vickey, Dee Loc's girl.
- Angell Conwell as Antionette, a gold-digging receptionist at the car wash.
- Bruce Bruce as DeWayne, an overweight security guard at the wash and is Mr. Washington's nephew.
- DJ Pooh as "Slim", a clueless and gullible gang member who kidnapped Mr. Washington.
- Shawn Fonteno as "Face", Slim's best friend.
- Isley Nicole Melton as Karen
- Tommy Chong as Dee's Connection
- Tray Deee as Thug #3
- Kurupt as "Maniac", Vicky's younger brother.
- Ludacris as Angry Customer
- Shaquille O'Neal as Norman
- Pauly Shore as Man In Trunk
- Xzibit as Wayne
- Julio G as Himself
- Pierre Edwards as Mark
- Kent Masters King as Michelle, Sean's love interest.
- Iva La'Shawn as Diane
- Don "Magic" Juan as Himself (deleted scene)
- Eminem as Chris (uncredited)

== Reception ==
=== Box office ===
In United States and Canada, the film earned $10,097,538, and in international markets $131,793, for a total gross of $10,229,331.

=== Critical response ===
The review aggregation website Rotten Tomatoes gives the film an approval rating of 8%, based on reviews from 50 critics, with an average rating of 3/10. The site's consensus states "Sloppily-made, amateurish, and scarce on laughs, The Wash can't compare to Richard Pryor's 1976 Car Wash." Metacritic, which uses a weighted average, assigned the film a score of 18 out of 100, based on 15 critics, indicating "overwhelming dislike".

=== Awards ===
Stony Awards
Year	Result	Category
2002	Won	Stoner of the Year: Snoop Dogg
2002	Won	Best Soundtrack

== Home media ==
The film was released on VHS and DVD in March 2002.

== See also ==
- List of hood films
