= The Right to Bare Arms =

Live album by Larry the Cable Guy
- Released: March 29, 2005
- Recorded: January 15–16, 2005
- Genre: Comedy
- Length: 56:10
- Label: Warner Bros. Nashville
- Producer: Peter Strickland, J.P. Williams, Larry the Cable Guy (exec.)

Larry the Cable Guy chronology
A Very Larry Christmas (2004)	The Right to Bare Arms (2005)	Morning Constitutions (2007)

The Right to Bare Arms is an album by American comedian Larry the Cable Guy, released on March 29, 2005 on Warner Music Nashville. It has been certified platinum by the RIAA. It was recorded live at the Verizon Wireless Theater (now Bayou Music Center) in Houston, Texas on January 15 and 16, 2005.

As of 2014, sales in the United States have exceeded 960,000 copies, according to Nielsen SoundScan.

Professional ratings
Review scores
Source	Rating
Allmusic	3.5/5 stars

== Track listing ==
All material written by Larry the Cable Guy.

1. "Git-R-Done!" – 1:20
2. "Midgets and Gay Bars" – 0:48
3. "WWJD" – 2:20
4. "Las Vegas" – 4:07
5. "Hank Williams Jr. High School" – 1:51
6. "Hooters and Hooters Airlines" – 4:38
7. "Dodge Truck, Retards and Stinkbait" – 1:49
8. "NASCAR" – 3:07
9. "The Right to Bare Arms!" – 4:07
10. "Family in Sanford" – 4:19
11. "Faith Healers and Weight Problems" – 4:02
12. "Romance and Imported Rubbers (I Seen This on TV... No Lie)" – 6:35
13. "Throwed Outta Penney's" – 1:01
14. "Shavin', Waxin', Primpin' and Shootin' Quail! (This Is Funny, I Don't Care Who Ya Are!)" – 3:24
15. "News Items" – 1:25
16. "Song for a Friend (And Other Things I Think About When I'm Hammered at 4 A.M.)" – 4:13
17. "Toddler Mail" – 7:04

== Charts ==
=== Weekly charts ===
Chart (2005)	Peak position
US Billboard 200	7
US Top Comedy Albums (Billboard)	1
US Top Country Albums (Billboard)	1

=== Year-end charts ===
Chart (2005)	Position
US Billboard 200	124
US Top Country Albums (Billboard)	18
Chart (2006)	Position
US Top Country Albums (Billboard)	60

== Certifications ==
Region	Certification	Certified units/sales
United States (RIAA)	Platinum	1,000,000^{^}
^{^} Shipments figures based on certification alone.
