= A Very Larry Christmas =

Studio album by Larry the Cable Guy
- Released: November 16, 2004
- Genre: Comedy
- Length: 36:28
- Label: Warner Bros.
- Producer: Tom Carr, J.P. Williams, Michael Winslow

Larry the Cable Guy chronology
Lord, I Apologize (2001)	A Very Larry Christmas (2004)	The Right to Bare Arms (2005)

A Very Larry Christmas is an album by American comedian Larry the Cable Guy, released on November 16, 2004, on Warner Bros. Records. It is composed of radio commentaries dealing with Christmas, as well as musical tracks.

Professional ratings
Review scores
Source	Rating
Allmusic	link

== Track listing (2004 Warner Bros. version) ==
1. "Christmas Commentary" - 2:25
2. "The Christmas Story" - 2:16
3. "Santy for a Day" - 1:38
4. "Oh Holy Crap" - 0:15
5. "Fat Holiday Relatives" - 1:29
6. "Singing Christmas Tree" - 1:35
7. "A Letter to Shania Twain" - 2:23
8. "O Little Girl from Birmingham" - 0:21
9. "Waiter Commentary" - 1:33
10. "Donny the Retard" - 0:09
11. "Pissed-Off Christmas Poem" - 1:39
12. "The Most Wonderful Ass" - 0:18
13. "Titty Bar Christmas" - 2:09
14. "Easy-to-Assemble" - 1:52
15. "The First Queer Santy Claus" - 0:16
16. "Fruitcake Commentary" - 2:07
17. "Santy Claus, Santy Claus" - 2:25
18. "I Pissed My Pants" - 0:25
19. "Christmas Weight Gain" - 1:34
20. "Grandpa's Thanksgiving Story" - 2:07
21. "On the First Day of Christmas" - 0:08
22. "Redneck Santa Claus" - 1:09
23. "Hark, The Hairlip Angel" - 0:10
24. "A Letter to Santa Claus" - 1:44
25. "Sticks and Horse Turds" - 1:23
26. "Call a Doctor" - 0:18
27. "Gift Giving" - 2:12
28. "I Wish My Mother-in-Law'd Get Hit by a Car" - 0:28

== Charts ==
=== Weekly charts ===
Chart (2004)	Peak position
US Billboard 200	43
US Top Comedy Albums (Billboard)	1
US Top Country Albums (Billboard)	8
US Top Holiday Albums (Billboard)	3

=== Year-end charts ===
Chart (2005)	Position
US Top Country Albums (Billboard)	64

== Certifications ==
Region	Certification	Certified units/sales
United States (RIAA)	Platinum	1,012,000
