= Berean Christian School (Knoxville, Tennessee) =

Location
- 2329 Prosser Rd; Knoxville, Tennessee 37914
- Coordinates: 36.0084°N 83.8923°W

Information
- School type: Private
- Founded: 1980
- Head of School: Jonathan Farra
- Upper Campus Principal: Mark Little
- Lower Campus Principal: Amanda Hickman
- Grades: K–12
- Enrollment: 350 (2015)
- Colors: Blue and Gold
- Mascot: Eagle
- Website: bereanchristian.org

Berean Christian School (BCS) is a private, Christian co-educational school in Knoxville, Tennessee, serving Kindergarten through the 12th grade. Their name comes from the Berean people from the biblical book of Acts.

== Accreditation ==
Berean Christian School is accredited by the Association of Christian Schools International (ACSI) and the Southern Association of Colleges and Schools (SACS).

== History ==
Berean Christian School was founded in 1980 as a ministry outreach of Berean Bible Church in Knoxville, Tennessee, initially just using the church's main building as the campus. Eventually, the school outgrew into an upper campus built on the hill behind the church, which now serves as classroom space for the middle school and high school. Today, Berean is known for having an exceptional Fine Arts program.

== Athletics ==
The BCS Eagles compete in TSSAA's east grand division and 2nd athletic district. The school offers baseball (Note: Co-op with The King's Academy (Seymour, Tennessee)), basketball, cheerleading, cross country, golf, soccer, softball, tennis, track and field, volleyball.

In 2017, the girls' volleyball team became the first sports team of the BCS to achieve a state championship title.
