= Berean Christian School (Fairview Heights, Illinois) =

Coordinates: 38°34′38″N 89°58′57″W

Location
- 5100 N. Illinois; Fairview Heights, Illinois 62208

Information
- School type: Private
- Founded: 1972
- Grades: K-12
- Mascot: Eagle
- Affiliation: Christian
- Website: http://www.bereanchristianschool.net

Berean Christian School (BCS) is a private K-12 Christian school in Fairview Heights, Illinois, USA. The school, that was named after the Bereans, is operated as a ministry of the Edgemont Bible Church (EBC).

Established in 1972, it was accredited as a MODEL school in 1996. The school uses the Accelerated Christian Education curriculum.
