= Berean Christian School (West Palm Beach, Florida) =

Private school in Florida, United States

Coordinates: 26.706734°N 80.175361°W

Berean Christian School is a private school in West Palm Beach, Florida. Berean Christian School was founded in 1964 by pastor Mike Kalapp of the Berean Baptist Temple. It is now a ministry of Grace Fellowship, a local independent church.
