= Larry the Cable Guy =

American stand-up comedian (born 1963)

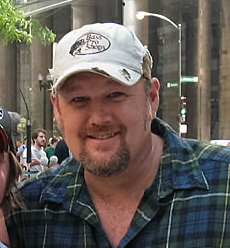
- Whitney in 2007
- Born: Daniel Lawrence Whitney; February 17, 1963 (age 63); Pawnee City, Nebraska, U.S.
- Education: Baptist University of America (attended); University of Nebraska–Lincoln (attended)
- Notable work: Blue Collar Comedy Tour; Delta Farce; Larry the Cable Guy: Health Inspector; Only in America with Larry the Cable Guy; Witless Protection; Cars franchise as Mater
- Spouse: Cara Whitney (m. 2005)
- Children: 2

Comedy career
- Years active: 1986–present
- Medium: Stand-up, television, film, radio, books, music
- Genres: Country comedy, character comedy, blue comedy, insult comedy, observational comedy, political satire, musical comedy
- Subjects: Southern culture, American politics, obesity, human sexuality, political correctness, self-deprecation, family, personal hygiene, current events
- Website: Official website

Daniel Lawrence Whitney (born February 17, 1963), known professionally as Larry the Cable Guy, is an American stand-up comedian, actor and former radio personality. He was one of the members of the Blue Collar Comedy Tour, a comedy troupe which included Bill Engvall, Ron White, and Jeff Foxworthy (with whom he has starred on Blue Collar TV).

"Larry the Cable Guy" Says "Git-r-Done!" and Watch NASA TV – video from NASA

Whitney has released seven comedy albums, two of which have been certified platinum by the RIAA for shipments of 1,000,000 copies and one of which has been certified gold for shipments of 500,000 copies. He has starred in three Blue Collar Comedy Tour related films, alongside Larry the Cable Guy: Health Inspector, Delta Farce and Witless Protection, and provides the voice of Mater in Disney/Pixar's Cars franchise. Whitney's catchphrase "Git-R-Done!" is also the title of his book.

== Early life ==
Whitney was born in Nebraska to Tom and Shirley Whitney, and grew up on an 80-acre farm outside Pawnee City, Nebraska. His father was a Christian minister. When he was 16, his family moved to West Palm Beach, Florida. Whitney attended high school at The King's Academy in West Palm Beach, Florida, from the late 1970s through 1980 where his father was the elementary school principal. He graduated from Berean Christian School in West Palm Beach in 1982 where he played football. He went to college at Baptist University of America in Georgia, and the University of Nebraska–Lincoln. He majored in drama and speech. He credits his roommates from Texas and Georgia for inspiring his Southern accent impression. He dropped out after his junior year after trying his hand at comedy.

== Career ==
=== Radio career ===
Whitney started his career in radio in the early 1990s when he made regular radio appearances on the nationally syndicated program, The Ron and Ron Show, as well as other radio shows such as The Bob & Tom Show, Wakin' Up with the Wolf on WPDH, The Chris Baker Show on KDGE and KEZO's The Todd and Tyler Radio Empire in Omaha, Nebraska, as well as the Kirk, Mark, and Lopez morning show on WIYY in Baltimore, Maryland. He was also a frequent guest on The Johnny Dare Morning Show on 98.9/KQRC, Kansas City, Missouri.

He also appeared on WJRR in Orlando Florida. He was also on the WHTQ 96.5 morning show in Orlando Florida. He was brought to New England on Greg and the Morning Buzz on WHEB 100.3 and WGIR-FM 101.1 in Portsmouth and Manchester, New Hampshire, respectively, doing two commentaries a week.

=== Stand-up career ===
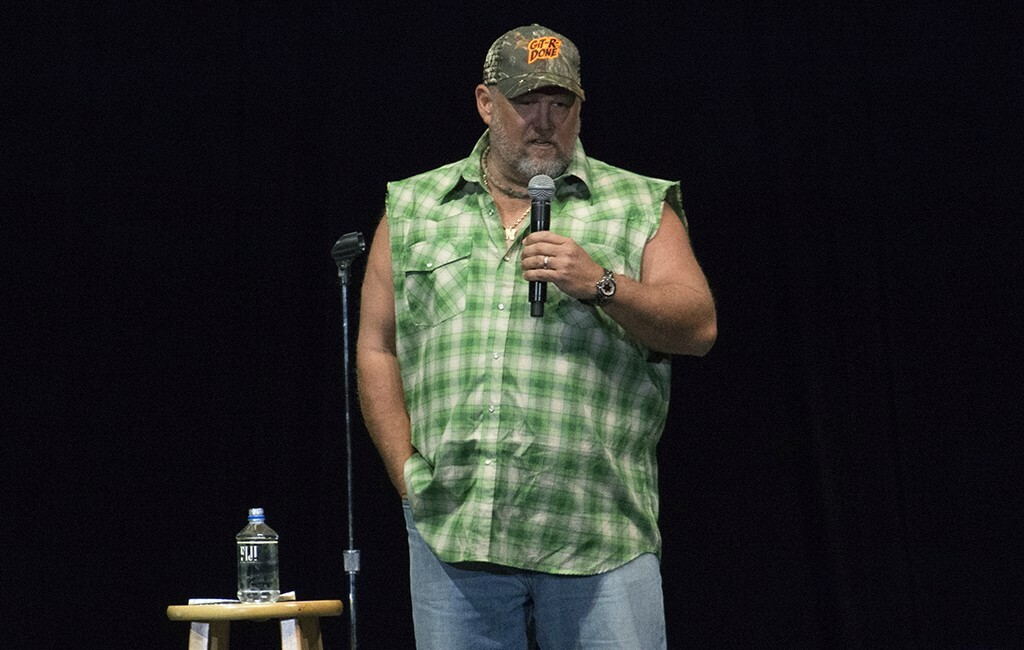
Larry the Cable Guy in performance at the Resch Center in Green Bay in 2015

Initially performing stand-up under his real name with limited success, he became famous after developing the Cable Guy character, a personality that he now maintains throughout his stage act. The Cable Guy character has a stereotypical redneck appearance and a thick Southern accent, recounts stories about his "family", and uses, among other common expressions, his own catchphrase "Git-R-Done!"

He says in interviews and in his autobiographical book GIT-R-DONE that he deliberately "turns on" the accent both on and off stage, because he may forget it if he kept his normal accent intact. He uses catchphrase humor, including "Lord, I apologize for that, there, and be with the starvin' Pygmies in New Guinea. Amen," after telling jokes of questionable taste; and, "I don't care who ya are, that's funny right there," after jokes that evoke raucous laughter.

He became well-known as one of the members of the Blue Collar Comedy Tour, a comedy troupe which included Bill Engvall, Ron White, and Jeff Foxworthy (with whom he has starred on Blue Collar TV). The tour also spawned three films and a satellite radio show.

His first two comedy albums, Lord, I Apologize (2001) and The Right to Bare Arms (2005), have both been certified gold by the RIAA. A third album, Morning Constitutions, and its accompanying TV special were released in 2007.

=== Other work ===
Whitney starred in the films Larry the Cable Guy: Health Inspector (2006), Delta Farce (2007) and Witless Protection (2008). He provided the voice of Tow Mater, a rusty blue tow truck, in the Disney/Pixar film Cars (2006) and its sequels, Cars 2 (2011), and Cars 3 (2017), as well as the short-form Cars series Tales from Radiator Springs and Cars on the Road, and several video games in the franchise.

Whitney was roasted in a Comedy Central special on March 15, 2009.

On February 8, 2011, the premiere of his newest travelogue series, Only in America with Larry the Cable Guy, was broadcast on the History Channel. A total of 4.1 million viewers, 1.7 million adults 25–54, tuned in, nearly doubling the total for the "Top Shot" season 2 opener. During season two in the episode "Larry Goes To Washington", Whitney was the first on-air talent from a non-news crew allowed in the War Room, also known as the Command Center, as he explained during the program. The series finale aired August 28, 2013.

In June 2012, Disneyland's California Adventure theme park's "Cars Land" opened a ride called "Mater's Junkyard Jamboree" that features Whitney's voice as his character Mater from the Disney/Pixar Cars films.

Bektrom Foods of North Dakota developed a line of Larry the Cable Guy food products, such as boxed hamburger dinners, with some of the proceeds from its sales benefiting the "Git-R-Done Foundation".

Whitney's later films include Tooth Fairy 2 (2012), A Madea Christmas (2013), and Jingle All the Way 2 (2014). He competed in season six of The Masked Singer as the wild card contestant "Baby" which was the show's first human character.

== Personal life ==
Whitney and his wife Cara married in 2005. They have a son, Wyatt, and a daughter, Reagan. The Whitney family resides in Lincoln, Nebraska, on a 180-acre (73 ha) farm. The couple started the Git-R-Done Foundation in 2009 to provide assistance to those that have experienced hardships beyond their control. Whitney is a Christian who re-committed to his faith in 2014.

Whitney's hometown of Pawnee City, Nebraska, has a street named after him. Whitney also donated money to buy new theatrical equipment for the local high school.

Whitney is a fan of the Professional Bull Riders (PBR) circuit and has co-owned some bucking bulls over the years. Among them was Chicken on a Chain, who was the 2007 PBR World Champion Bull.

Whitney is also an avid Nebraska Cornhuskers football fan. His signature camouflage hat has the University of Nebraska–Lincoln nickname "HUSKERS" emblazoned on it, as seen in the 2007 film Delta Farce. He is also frequently seen with a gold Nebraska "N" on a chain around his neck. On October 1, 2016, in his luxury suite at Memorial Stadium during the Nebraska vs. Illinois football game, Whitney was challenged to an arm wrestling match by an Army veteran and Nebraska Army National Guard member, John O'Connell, who lost the match in less than one minute with his arm (humerus) broken by Whitney.

In September 2010, Whitney donated $5 million to the Arnold Palmer Hospital for Children in Orlando, Florida. The gift was for further development of the International Hip Dysplasia Institute at the Orlando hospital. After Dr. Chad Price at Arnold Palmer Hospital for Children helped cure their son, Wyatt, of his dysplasia when he was an infant, Whitney and his wife, Cara, made private donations to the hospital and Whitney raised money through appearances on Family Feud and Are You Smarter Than a 5th Grader?. The hospital opened a new wing called the Wyatt Whitney Wing in May 2012.

Whitney is also an avid REO Speedwagon fan. In 2013, he appeared with the band, including a benefit concert in Bloomington, Illinois, for tornado disaster relief.

Whitney owns a George Strait neon sign that he bought backstage at Billy Bob's Texas in Fort Worth, Texas.

Whitney endorsed Donald Trump for the 2016 U.S. presidential election.

== Radio shows ==
Whitney currently works as a radio personality for SiriusXM's Jeff & Larry's Comedy Roundup channel.

== Discography ==
Title	Album details	Peak chart positions			Certifications
Title	Album details	US	US Country	US Comedy	Certifications
Law and Disorder	Release date: February 10, 1995; Label: Self-released	—	—	—	
Salutations and Flatulations	Release date: September 29, 1997; Label: DJT Records	—	—	—	
Lord, I Apologize	Release date: October 30, 2001; Label: Hip-O Records	—	53	1	US: Gold
A Very Larry Christmas	Release date: November 16, 2004; Label: Warner Bros. Records	43	8	1	US: Platinum
The Right to Bare Arms	Release date: March 29, 2005; Label: Warner Bros. Records	7	1	1	US: Platinum
Morning Constitutions	Release date: April 3, 2007; Label: Warner Bros. Records	16	5	1	
Christmastime in Larryland	Release date: October 3, 2007; Label: Warner Bros. Records	42	12	1	
Tailgate Party	Release date: September 22, 2009; Label: Warner Bros. Records	71	19	1	
The Best of Larry the Cable Guy	Release date: November 16, 2010; Label: Warner Bros. Records		72	4	
Them Idiots: Whirled Tour (with Bill Engvall and Jeff Foxworthy)	Release date: March 13, 2012; Label: Warner Music Nashville		45	1	
We've Been Thinking (with Jeff Foxworthy)	Release date: September 29, 2017; Label: Comedy Dynamics, Netflix	—	—	—	
"—" denotes releases that did not chart

- ^{A} Box set consisting of The Right to Bare Arms, Christmastime in Larryland, and Morning Constitutions.

== Filmography ==
=== Film ===
Year	Title	Role	Notes
2003	Blue Collar Comedy Tour: The Movie	Larry	Documentary
2006	Larry the Cable Guy: Health Inspector	Larry	
2006	Cars	Mater	Voice
2006	Mater and the Ghostlight	Mater	Voice; Short film; direct-to-video
2007	Delta Farce	Larry	
2008	Witless Protection	Deputy Larry Stalder	
2011	Cars 2	Mater	Voice
2012	Them Idiots: Whirled Tour	Himself	
2012	Tooth Fairy 2	Larry Guthrie	Direct-to-video
2013	A Madea Christmas	Buddy	
2014	Jingle All the Way 2	Larry Phillips	Direct-to-video
2016	Jeff Foxworthy and Larry the Cable Guy: We've Been Thinking	Himself	Documentary
2017	Cars 3	Mater	Voice
2020	Remain Seated	Himself	Stand-up special
2025	It's a Gift	Himself	Stand-up special

=== Television ===
Year	Title	Role	Notes
2004	Larry the Cable Guy: Git-R-Done	Larry	Television movie
2004	Blue Collar Comedy Tour Rides Again	Larry	TV documentary
2006	Blue Collar Comedy Tour: One for the Road	Larry	TV movie
2004–2006	Blue Collar TV	Various	Cast member
2008–2014	Cars Toons	Mater	Voice; 13 short films
2009	Are You Smarter Than a 5th Grader?	Himself	Episode: "3.13"
2009	Comedy Central Roast	Larry	TV special, The Comedy Central Roast of Larry the Cable Guy
2009	Larry the Cable Guy's Hula-Palooza Christmas Luau	Larry	TV movie
2010	Larry the Cable Guy: Tailgate Party	Larry	TV movie
2011–2013	Only in America with Larry the Cable Guy	Host	
2013	Bounty Hunters	Larry	
2014	CMT Artists of the Year	Host	
2020	Cruisin' with the Huskers	Host	
2021	The Masked Singer	Himself/Baby	Season 6 contestant; eliminated in fourth episode
2021	Yellowstone	Officer (Uncredited)	Episode: "Half the Money"
2022	Cars on the Road	Mater	Voice; Disney+ original
2027	Cars: Lightning Racers	Mater	Voice; upcoming series

As producer
Year	Title	Notes
2007	Larry the Cable Guy: Morning Constitutions	TV movie
2007	Larry the Cable Guy's Christmas Spectacular	TV movie
2008	Larry the Cable Guy's Star-Studded Christmas Extravaganza	TV special
2009	The Comedy Central Roast of Larry the Cable Guy	TV documentary
2009	Larry the Cable Guy's Hula-Palooza Christmas Luau	TV movie
2010	Larry the Cable Guy: Tailgate Party	TV movie
2013	Bounty Hunters	TV series; 8 episodes
2011–2013	Only in America with Larry the Cable Guy	50 episodes
2016	Jeff Foxworthy & Larry the Cable Guy: We've Been Thinking	TV documentary

=== Video games ===
Year	Title	Voice Role
2006	Cars	Mater
2006	Cars: Radiator Springs Adventures	Mater
2007	Cars Mater-National Championship	Mater
2009	Cars Race-O-Rama	Mater
2010	Cars Toon: Mater's Tall Tales	Mater
2010–2012	The World of Cars Online	Mater
2011	Cars 2	Mater
2012	Kinect Rush: A Disney-Pixar Adventure	Mater
2013	Disney Infinity	Mater
2014	Cars: Fast as Lightning	Mater
2014	Disney Infinity: Marvel Super Heroes	Mater
2015	Disney Infinity 3.0	Mater
2026	Disney Speedstorm	Mater

=== Theme park attractions ===
Year	Title	Voice Role
2012–present	Radiator Springs Racers	Mater
2012–present	Mater's Junkyard Jamboree	Mater
2019–2024	Lightning McQueen's Racing Academy	Mater

== Book ==
- Git-R-Done. Crown Publishing Group. 2005. ISBN 9780307237422.

== Awards and nominations ==
Year	Nominated work	Category	Result
Golden Raspberry Awards
2007	Larry the Cable Guy: Health Inspector	Worst Actor	Nominated
2009	Witless Protection	Worst Actor	Nominated
2009	Witless Protection	Worst Screen Couple (with Jenny McCarthy)	Nominated
2014	A Madea Christmas	Worst Screen Combo (with Tyler Perry)	Nominated
2014	A Madea Christmas	Worst Supporting Actor	Nominated
Grammy Award
2006	The Right to Bare Arms	Best Comedy Album	Nominated
2007	Blue Collar Comedy Tour: One for the Road (with Jeff Foxworthy, Bill Engvall & Ron White)	Best Comedy Album	Nominated
Visual Effects Society
2007	Cars	Outstanding Performance by an Animated Character in an Animated Motion Picture	Won
