= Natural Born Kissers =

- The Simpsons episode
- Episode no.: Season 9 Episode 25
- Directed by: Klay Hall
- Written by: Matt Selman
- Production code: 5F18
- Original air date: May 17, 1998

Episode features
- Chalkboard gag: "I was not the inspiration for Kramer"
- Couch gag: The Simpson family appear as frogs on a lily pad and Homer turns on the TV with his long tongue.
- Commentary: Matt Groening; Mike Scully; George Meyer; Matt Selman; Dan Castellaneta; Mark Kirkland

Episode chronology
| ← Previous "Lost Our Lisa" | Next → "Lard of the Dance" |
- The Simpsons season 9

"Natural Born Kissers" is the twenty-fifth and final episode of the ninth season of the American animated television series The Simpsons. It originally aired on Fox in the United States on May 17, 1998. Homer and Marge discover that the fear of getting caught while making love is a turn on and start making love in public places. It was the first episode to be written by Matt Selman and was also the first and only The Simpsons episode to be directed by Klay Hall. Some networks list the episode by the title, "Margie, May I Sleep with Danger?"

Matt Groening listed the episode as being his eighth favorite, and the aroused cow is one of his all-time favorite act break jokes. Andy Dougan of the Evening Times characterized the episode along with "Large Marge", "Three Gays of the Condo", and "The Way We Weren't", as "four of the funniest episodes of recent series". The DVD release was also reviewed favorably by Louis R. Carlozo in the Chicago Tribune, where the episode was seen as "more ridiculous" than "Large Marge".

== Plot ==
It is Homer and Marge's eleventh wedding anniversary and Grampa does not arrive at the Simpson house to babysit the children having mistaken them for the Flanders children next door, spoiling Homer and Marge's evening together. Later that evening, Homer and Marge attempt to have sexual intercourse, but lack enthusiasm.

The following day, the refrigerator's motor burns out after Homer left the door open to look at a slice of his and Marge's wedding cake. As Homer and Marge make their way to a hardware store to buy another one, their car gets stuck in the muddy driveway in the middle of farm country. Homer and Marge rush into the nearest barn to avoid a sudden storm. A farmer discovers the barn door is open and suspects trespassers. He enters the barn, nearly catching Homer and Marge, who are hiding in the hay loft, but leaves after failing to locate them. When the coast is clear, Homer and Marge have inspired sex in the hay loft.

Homer and Marge think their marriage has been recharged and go for a romantic weekend at a bed and breakfast, but soon fall into their old patterns. However, a maid walks in on them and they conclude they are both aroused when they risk being caught during intimate moments, so they have sex behind window curtains in a room full of people.

Their love life is recharged and one day they begin to have sex on the same miniature golf course windmill where Bart was conceived. This time they come too close to being caught having public sex, and while they manage to escape, they have to flee through Springfield naked. After trying to seek help from Gil at his car lot, they steal his hot air balloon and fly throughout the city in it. As Marge tries to pilot the balloon after Homer falls and is left hanging on the rope, the balloon lands in a football stadium, and a naked photograph of Homer and Marge appears in the local newspaper. The next day, Bart and Lisa see the picture and their parents begin to explain sex to them. Before they go into detail, however, they decide to go back to the miniature golf course.

In a subplot, Bart and Lisa stay at the Springfield Retirement Castle with Grampa, and they discover a metal detector in his closet. While Bart uses it to look for pirate treasure, they uncover a film reel of an alternate ending to Casablanca. They watch the scene, which turns out to be a very sanitized and typical Hollywood happy ending, where Humphrey Bogart and Ingrid Bergman's characters marry in the end. Bart, Lisa and Grampa all like it but the Old Jewish Man reveals that he was once a studio executive and tried to include this happy ending on the film. Disgruntled, he pays Bart and Lisa to dispose of the reel, along with another reel of a killing spree ending to It's a Wonderful Life.

== Production ==
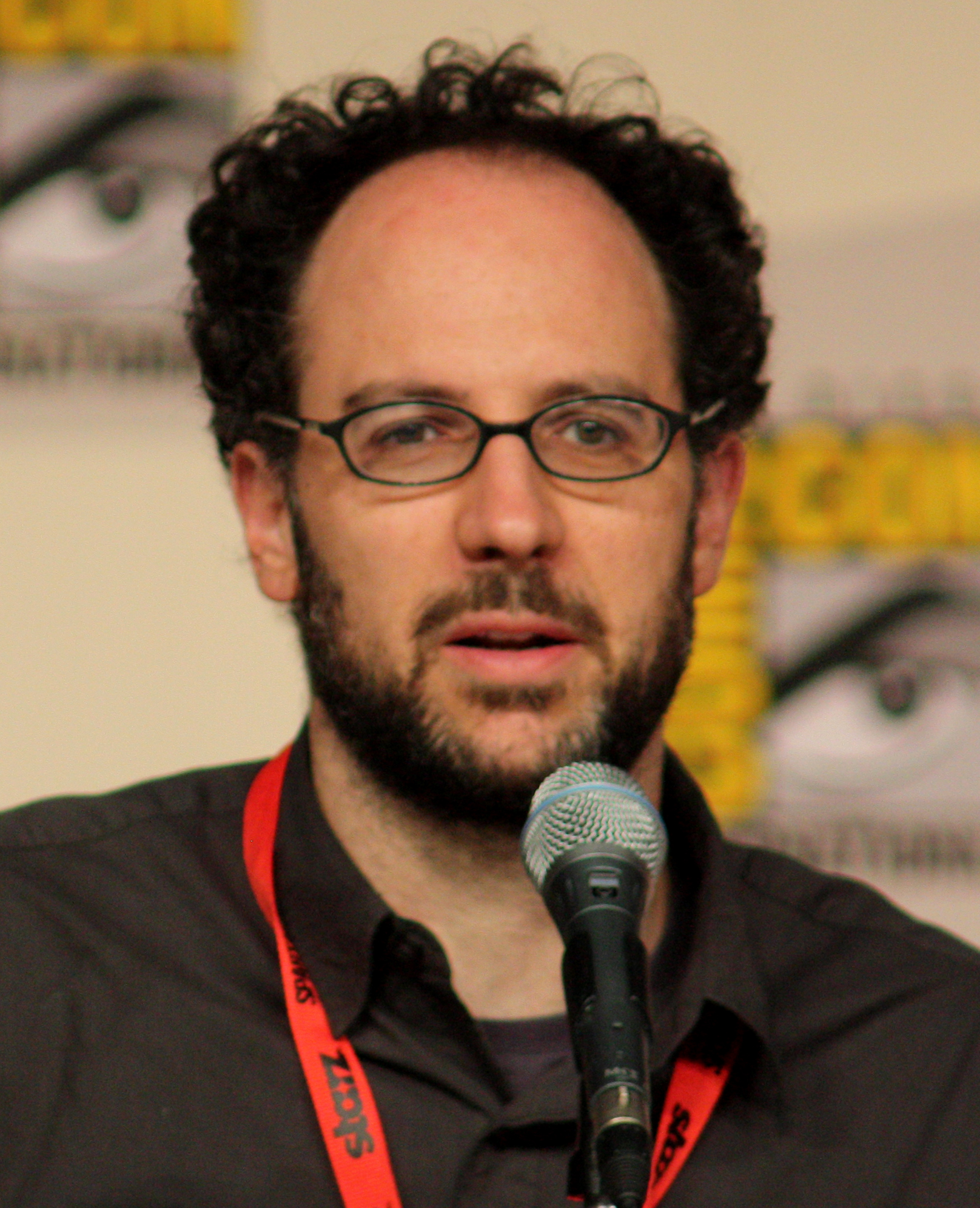
This was the first episode written by Matt Selman.

"Natural Born Kissers" was the first episode written by Matt Selman, who partly based it on his parents' marriage. The episode was the only time that show runner Mike Scully ever got a call from 20th Century Fox where they suggested not doing the episode. They were worried about the sexual content, the nudity, and how it was going to be handled. They disliked several of the phrases used in the episode, such as the term "ass forkin'".

In an interview, Matt Groening said: "The network censors couldn't believe it, and neither could I: the cow at the peephole while Homer and Marge make love in a hayloft; neighbors groping Homer when he and Marge are caught nude inside the windmill at the Sir Putts-A-Lot mini golf course; Homer dangling naked from a hot-air balloon, his ass dragging against the glass of a Crystal Cathedral-like church".

The producers fought the censors and in the end, very little of the script was modified. This episode is the first time that Marge's buttocks are shown on television. Marge and Homer in the golf course is a reference to the season three episode "I Married Marge", although in that episode they are in a castle, rather than a windmill.

== Cultural references ==
The title of the episode is a play on the film Natural Born Killers. The airplane restaurant "Up, Up and Buffet!" (a play on the song "Up, Up and Away") is based on a submarine-shaped restaurant that was near the Fox studio named Dive! A supposed alternate ending to the 1942 film Casablanca is shown in the episode, and the Old Jewish Man gives Bart and Lisa a copy of It's a Wonderful Life with a "killing-spree ending". The song "Spanish Flea" plays during the radio commercial for Divorce Specialists; it was heard in the season three episode "The Otto Show" while Homer sat in the car during the Spinal Tap concert. Homer finds a flyer from Frank Grimes's funeral. Marge refers to sex as "rocking the casbah", and consequently the song "Rock the Casbah" by The Clash plays over the end credits.

== Reception ==
In its original broadcast, "Natural Born Kissers" finished 29th in ratings for the week of May 11–18, 1998, with a Nielsen rating of 8.8, equivalent to approximately 8.6 million viewing households. It was the fourth highest-rated show on the Fox network that week, following The X-Files, King of the Hill, and Ally McBeal.

Matt Groening listed the episode as being his eighth favorite episode, and the aroused cow is one of his all-time favorite act break jokes. The authors of the book I Can't Believe It's a Bigger and Better Updated Unofficial Simpsons Guide, Warren Martyn and Adrian Wood, wrote, "a superb episode which actually makes Marge and Homer's love life seem very real; everyone needs a bit of spice now and again, and they find theirs. The balloon trip is hysterical, and the attempts to explain their behaviour to a very worldly-wise Bart and Lisa are magnificent."

The episode was part of a DVD boxed set release called The Simpsons Kiss and Tell: The Story of Their Love, and in his review of the release, Andy Dougan of the Evening Times characterized the episode along with "Large Marge", "Three Gays of the Condo", and "The Way We Weren't", as "four of the funniest episodes of recent series". The DVD release was also reviewed favorably by Louis R. Carlozo in the Chicago Tribune, where the episode was seen as "more ridiculous" than "Large Marge".

In the last of The A.V. Club's "Classic Simpsons" recaps, Les Chappell writes that the episode is a fitting conclusion to the show's ninth season: "It's a great encapsulation of how this family works: Homer and Marge have to try to explain things to children who are too worldly to fall for most excuses, the explanation trails off, and what could be a pleasant family outing to solve it all turns out to be yet another excuse for self-involvement when one public humiliation doesn't outweigh the joys of getting busy in a windmill. The Simpsons are a weird, dysfunctional, and ultimately loving family, and this is an ending—and an episode—that reminds us how wonderful that can be."
