= Klay Hall =

American animation director

- Born: September 11, 1958 (age 68); Los Angeles, California, U.S.
- Education: California Institute of the Arts
- Occupations: Animator, storyboard artist, television director, film director
- Years active: 1987–present
- Notable work: Tinker Bell and the Lost Treasure; Planes

Klay Hall (born September 11, 1958) is an American animator, storyboard artist, television director, and film director.

Klay launched his animation career on Amazing Stories, Cool World, and Mighty Mouse: The New Adventures, before working as director on The Simpsons, and Family Dog. Klay later became supervising director of 89 episodes of King of the Hill at Film Roman.

Hall's first direction on a CGI property was the series Father of the Pride, produced by DreamWorks Animation and animated by Imagi Studios.

In 2005, Hall was hired by DisneyToon Studios as story editor for their first CGI feature, Tinker Bell (2008), followed by directing Tinker Bell and the Lost Treasure (2009), which was executive produced by John Lasseter and produced by Sean Lurie.

In 2013, Hall directed a Cars spin-off film at DisneyToon Studios, titled Planes.

== Filmography (as a director) ==
- Family Dog - "Family Dog Goes Homeless" (1993)
- Bobby's World - (8 episodes, 1993–1996)
- Garfield and Friends - "The Jelly Roger" (1994)
- The Simpsons - "Natural Born Kissers" (1998)
- King of the Hill - (89 episodes; supervising director, 1997–2000)
- Father of the Pride (2004-2005)
- Tinker Bell and the Lost Treasure (2009)
- Planes (2013)
