= Planes (film) =

2013 American Disneytoon film

- Theatrical release poster
- Directed by: Klay Hall
- Screenplay by: Jeffrey M. Howard
- Story by: John Lasseter; Klay Hall; Jeffrey M. Howard
- Produced by: Traci Balthazor-Flynn
- Starring: Dane Cook; Stacy Keach; Priyanka Chopra; Teri Hatcher; Brad Garrett; Julia Louis-Dreyfus; Roger Craig Smith; John Cleese; Carlos Alazraqui; Anthony Edwards; Sinbad; Val Kilmer
- Edited by: Jeremy Milton
- Music by: Mark Mancina
- Production company: Disneytoon Studios
- Distributed by: Walt Disney Studios; Motion Pictures (Note: Distributed under the Walt Disney Pictures banner.)
- Release dates: August 2, 2013 (EAA AirVenture Oshkosh); August 9, 2013 (United States)
- Running time: 92 minutes
- Country: United States
- Language: English
- Budget: $50 million
- Box office: $240.2 million

Planes is a 2013 American animated sports comedy film produced by Disneytoon Studios, and a spin-off of Pixar's Cars franchise. The film stars the voices of Dane Cook, Stacy Keach, Priyanka Chopra, Teri Hatcher, Brad Garrett, Julia Louis-Dreyfus, Roger Craig Smith, John Cleese, Carlos Alazraqui, Anthony Edwards, Sinbad, and Val Kilmer. In the film, Dusty Crophopper, a crop duster plane in the town of Propwash Junction, wants to complete the Wings Around the Globe racing challenge, despite his fear of heights, with the help of naval aviator Skipper Riley.

The film was directed by Klay Hall and written by Jeffrey M. Howard. In developing a concept created by John Lasseter, the writers made a conscious effort to avoid remaking Cars in a new setting, while reusing Keach and Danny Mann's characters from the Cars Toons short "Air Mater". The production team conducted research by interviewing several pilots of plane types that were included in the movie. Jon Cryer was initially announced as the voice of Dusty, before being replaced by Cook; however, Cryer received credit on the film for "additional story material". The musical score was composed by Mark Mancina, while Prana Studios provided work on visual effects, animation and compositing.

Planes premiered on August 2, 2013, at EAA AirVenture Oshkosh, a gathering of aviation enthusiasts. It was initially intended to be released as a direct-to-video film, but was instead released theatrically on August 9, 2013. It received generally negative reviews from critics but grossed $240 million against a $50 million budget. A sequel, Planes: Fire & Rescue, was released in 2014.

== Plot ==
Dusty Crophopper, a young crop duster plane, works at a cornfield in Propwash Junction, Minnesota, and practices aerobatic maneuvers in his spare time. He dreams of becoming a racer but is scorned by his boss, Leadbottom, and his forklift mechanic friend, Dottie. However, he is supported by his fuel truck friend, Chug; Dusty and Chug train for qualifiers for the upcoming Wings Around the Globe Rally. On the night before the qualifiers, Dusty asks an elderly navy war plane named Skipper Riley to teach him to fly well, but Skipper declines. The next day, Dusty barely qualifies on a legal technicality.

Skipper eventually decides to mentor Dusty, and discovers Dusty has a fear of heights. With training complete, Dusty travels to New York City for the race. There, he befriends a Mexican racer named El Chupacabra, who falls in love with a French-Canadian racer named Rochelle but consistently fails to woo her. Three-time defending champion Ripslinger dismisses Dusty. Dusty falls in love with an Indian plane named Ishani, who becomes supportive of him. During the first leg of the race from New York to Iceland, Dusty's refusal to fly high causes him to finish in last place.

During the second leg of the race to Germany, Dusty shows good sportsmanship by saving another racer, Bulldog, from crashing, gaining his respect but finishing last again. After the third leg of the race to Agra in India, Ishani invites Dusty to fly around the Taj Mahal and advises him to fly low through the Himalayas by following some railroad tracks. After flying through a tunnel, Dusty is in first place at Upper Mustang in Nepal, but he is upset to discover that Ishani set him up in exchange for a new propeller from Ripslinger's team, and he shuns her.

The fifth leg is over the Hump (the mountains between northeast India and south China) to Shanghai, where Dusty gets into first place again. He manages to help El Chupacabra win over Rochelle with a romantic song. In the sixth leg of the race across the Pacific, Ripslinger has his sidekicks Ned and Zed break off Dusty's navigation antenna. Lost and low on fuel, Dusty comes across the USS Dwight D. Flysenhower, the naval base of Skipper's squadron, the Jolly Wrenches, which allows him to land. On the carrier, Dusty discovers that contrary to Skipper's own descriptions, he only flew one mission during war. Before he can obtain answers, a thunderstorm strikes, and he is forced to depart by the carrier crew. However, he ends up crashing into the Pacific Ocean and is severely damaged.

Dusty is salvaged and transported to Mexico where his concerned friends are also present. Skipper confesses his entire squadron perished when he was coaxed to lead an attack by one of his fighters on a recon mission; he never flew again after the navy salvaged him. Dusty considers dropping out of the race, but is encouraged to continue by many of his fellow competitors, who donate parts to repair the damage he sustained. Ishani also gives Dusty her new propeller, reconciling their friendship.

Racing back to New York, Ripslinger plots to finish off Dusty once again but is thwarted by Skipper, who regains his courage to fly. Dusty conquers his acrophobia when he rides a jetstream. Nearing the finish line, Ripslinger slows for the cameras, which allows Dusty to pass him at the last second and win. Dusty is congratulated by his friends, and Skipper thanks him for giving him the confidence to fly again. Dusty and Skipper visit the Flysenhower, where the former is inducted as an honorary Jolly Wrench in recognition of his victory. The two are launched off and decide to race back to Propwash Junction.

== Voice cast ==
- Dane Cook as Dusty Crophopper, a crop duster plane who hopes to complete Wings Around the Globe. He was inspired by the Air Tractor AT-502, Cessna 188 and the PZL-Mielec M-18 Dromader.
- Stacy Keach as Skipper Riley, a Chance Vought F4U Corsair and Dusty's mentor (who appeared in the Cars Toons episode "Air Mater")
- Priyanka Chopra as Ishani, a Pan-Asian champion from India, based on the AeroCad AeroCanard
- Danny Mann as Sparky, a forklift (who appeared in the Cars Toons episode "Air Mater")
- Brad Garrett as Chug, a fuel truck
- Teri Hatcher as Dottie, a forklift
- Cedric the Entertainer as Leadbottom, a biplane inspired by the Boeing-Stearman Model 75 with a partial engine cowl
- Julia Louis-Dreyfus as Rochelle, a racing plane inspired by the Bay Super V, a conversion of the V-tail Model 35 Beechcraft Bonanza. Originally from Quebec, her flag and paint job are localized in 11 countries. In Australia and New Zealand, Rochelle is re-contextualized as a former Tasmanian mail delivery plane, and is voiced by Jessica Marais. In Italian, she is Azzurra, an Italian prototype plane voiced by Micaela Ramazzotti.
- Roger Craig Smith as Ripslinger, a custom-built carbon-fiber plane with contra-rotating propellers (most likely inspired by a P-51D Mustang modified for racing) and Dusty's rival
- Gabriel Iglesias as Ned and Zed, Ripslinger's sidekicks inspired by the Zivko Edge 540 and MX Aircraft MXS
- John Cleese as Bulldog, a de Havilland DH.88 Comet
- Carlos Alazraqui as El Chupacabra, a Gee Bee Model R
- Val Kilmer as Bravo, a Boeing F/A-18E Super Hornet from U.S Navy fighter squadron VFA-103
- Anthony Edwards as Echo, another Boeing F/A-18E Super Hornet from U.S Navy fighter squadron VFA-103
- Colin Cowherd as Colin Cowling, a blimp. In the UK, the blimp character is named Lofty Crofty and is voiced by Sky Sports F1 commentator David Croft.
- Sinbad as Roper, a forklift
- Oliver Kalkofe as Franz aka Von Fliegenhosen, a German Aerocar
- Brent Musburger as Brent Mustangburger, a 1964½ Ford Mustang (who appeared in Cars 2)
- John Ratzenberger as Harland, a jet tug
- Barney Harwood as Sky Cam 1, a red helicopter filming the race over Germany

== Production ==
Planes is based on a concept created by John Lasseter. Although Pixar did not produce the film, Lasseter, then-chief creative officer of both Pixar and Walt Disney Animation Studios, and director of Cars and Cars 2, was also the executive producer of the film. The writers made a conscious effort to not remake Cars in a new setting, rejecting ideas that were too close to ideas in Cars while reusing the characters Skipper and Sparky from Cars Toons episode "Air Mater", with Stacy Keach and Danny Mann reprising their roles. The team also conducted research by interviewing several pilots of plane types that were included in the movie. Jon Cryer was initially announced as the voice of the main protagonist Dusty, but later dropped out and was replaced by Dane Cook. A modified version of the teaser trailer for the film (featuring Cook's voice in place of Cryer's) was released on February 27, 2013. Cryer did however receive credit on the film for "additional story material", along with Bobs Gannaway. Prana Studios provided work on visual effects, animation and compositing.

== Release ==
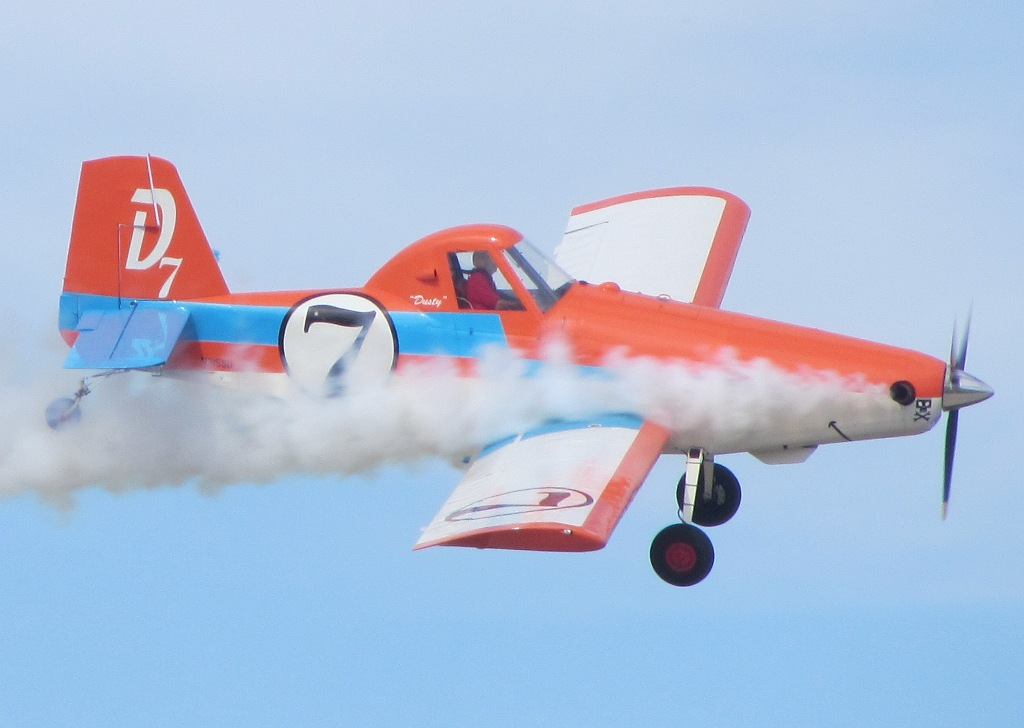
Air Tractor AT-400A painted as Dusty performing at the 2013 EAA AirVenture Oshkosh, where the film had a special screening

Planes was originally set to be released in North America as a direct-to-video film in Fall 2013, while having a theatrical release in Europe. However, in December 2012 Disney announced that the film would be released theatrically. This was the first Disneytoon Studios film released theatrically in North America since Pooh's Heffalump Movie eight and a half years earlier in 2005.

The film premiered on August 2, 2013, at a special screening at The Fly-In Theater at EAA AirVenture Oshkosh, an annual gathering of aviation enthusiasts in Oshkosh, Wisconsin. Along with the special screening of the movie, Disney brought a real life Dusty to be part of the activities. The real life version of Dusty was an Air Tractor AT-400A piloted and owned by agriculture pilot Rusty Lindeman. The film was theatrically released on August 9, 2013, when it was also screened at the D23 Expo in Anaheim, California, a biennial convention for Disney fans.

=== Home media ===
Planes was released by Walt Disney Studios Home Entertainment on DVD, Blu-ray and Blu-ray 3D on November 19, 2013. Blu-ray bonus features include "Franz's Song", an alternate sequence produced exclusively for the Blu-ray and HD digital releases, the featurette "Klay's Flight Plan", which follows director Klay Hall's personal journey during the making of the film, two deleted scenes with introductions by the director and producer, character interstitials, and "Top Ten Flyers", a countdown of history's greatest aviators hosted by Colin Cowherd.

== Reception ==
=== Critical response ===
The review aggregator website Rotten Tomatoes reported a 26% approval rating with an average rating of 4.60/10 based on 121 reviews. The website's consensus reads, "Planes has enough bright colors, goofy voices, and slick animation to distract some young viewers for 92 minutes -- and probably sell plenty of toys in the bargain -- but on nearly every other level, it's a Disney disappointment." Another review aggregator, Metacritic, which assigns a normalized rating out of 100 top reviews from mainstream critics, calculated a score of 39 based on 32 reviews, indicating "generally unfavorable reviews". However, the film earned an average grade of "A−" on an A+ to F scale from audiences polled by CinemaScore during the opening week.

Peter Hartlaub of the San Francisco Chronicle gave the film two and half stars out of four, saying, "Many will enter theaters thinking this is a Pixar film, with the raised expectations that accompany that mistake. But even cynical animation fans will see there's quality here. After a little turbulence, Planes comes in for a nice landing." Alonso Duralde of The Wrap gave the film a positive review, saying, "As shameless an attempt by Disney to sell more bedspreads to the under-10s as Planes is, it nonetheless manages to be a minor lark that will at least mildly amuse anyone who ever thrust their arms outward and pretended to soar over the landscape." Justin Chang of Variety gave the film a negative review, saying, "Planes is so overrun with broad cultural stereotypes that it should come with free ethnic-sensitivity training for especially impressionable kids." James Rocchi of MSN Movies gave the film one out of five stars, saying, "Planes borrows a world from Cars, but even compared to that soulless exercise in well-merchandised animated automotive adventure, Planes is dead in its big, googly eyes and hollow inside." Michael Rechtshaffen of The Hollywood Reporter gave the film a negative review, saying, "Despite the more aerodynamic setting, this Cars 3D offshoot emerges as an uninspired retread." Jordan Hoffman of the New York Daily News gave the film one out of five stars, saying, "The jokes in Planes are runway flat, and parents will likely reach for the air-sickness bag."

Bill Goodykoontz of The Arizona Republic gave the film two out of five stars, saying, "Planes was originally scheduled to be released straight to video. Although the smallest children might like bits and pieces of it, there's nothing in the movie that suggests why Disney strayed from its original plan." David Hiltbrand of The Philadelphia Inquirer gave the film one out of four stars, saying, "The animated film has all the hallmarks of a straight-to-DVD project — inferior plot, dull writing, cheap drawing — perhaps because it was intended for the bargain bin at Target, Walmart, and Costco." Jen Chaney of The Washington Post gave the film one and a half stars out of four, saying, "This film is 100 percent devoid of surprises. It's the story of an underestimated underdog that's like every other kid-friendly, life-coachy story about an underestimated underdog." Rafer Guzman of Newsday gave the film one and a half stars out of four, saying, "If Planes were a reasonably priced download, you'd gladly use it to sedate your kids during a long car ride. As a theatrical, 3-D release, however, Planes will sedate you, too." Neil Genzlinger of The New York Times gave the film two out of five stars, saying, Planes is for the most part content to imitate rather than innovate, presumably hoping to reap a respectable fraction of the box office numbers of Cars and Cars 2, which together made hundreds of millions of dollars."

Bruce Demara of the Toronto Star gave the film two and a half stars out of four, saying, "While the plotting is rather pedestrian, the humour mostly lame, what makes Planes a stand-out experience — not surprisingly, based on Disney's vast and impressive history of animated classics — is the visuals." Claudia Puig of USA Today gave the film two out of four stars, saying, "It's engaging enough, driving home the familiar message of following one's dreams and the less hackneyed theme of facing one's fears. But it feels far too familiar." Betsy Sharkey of the Los Angeles Times gave the film two and a half stars out of four, saying, "As with Cars, the world of Planes feels safe. A little too safe, perhaps." Richard Roeper of the Chicago Sun-Times gave the film a C, saying "Planes moves along quickly at a running time of 92 minutes, occasionally taking flight with some pretty nifty flight sequences. The animation is first-rate, and the Corningware colors are soothing eye candy."

Tom Keogh of The Seattle Times gave the film two and a half stars out of four, saying, "Though not officially a Pixar production, the new Planes — released by the beloved animation studio's parent company, Disney — has the look and feel of Pixar's 2006 hit, Cars, if not the latter's charm or strong story." Stephen Whitty of the Newark Star-Ledger gave the film two out of four stars, saying, "It's strictly by the numbers, from the believe-in-yourself moral to the purely predictable ending." Owen Gleiberman of Entertainment Weekly gave the film a B, saying, "What Planes lacks in novelty, it makes up for with eye-popping aerial sequences and a high-flying comic spirit." A. A. Dowd of The A.V. Club gave the film a D+, saying, "Planes cuts corners at every turn, a strategy that leaves it feeling like the skeletal framework of an incomplete Pixar project." R. Kurt Osenlund of Slant Magazine gave the film one out of four stars, saying, "The film feels second-rate in every sense, from the quality of its animation to its C-list voice cast." Dave Calhoun of Time Out gave the film three out of five stars, saying "Planes isn't a Pixar film, even if it's related to one (Disney bought Pixar in 2006), and there's nothing groundbreaking about the animation or script. That said, the characters and story still offer low-key charms."

=== Box office ===
Planes, despite negative reception, grossed $90,288,712 in the United States and Canada, and $149,883,071 in other countries, for a worldwide total of $240,171,783, and was a box office success. The film opened to number three in its first weekend, with $22,232,291, behind Elysium and We're the Millers. In its second weekend, the film dropped to number four, grossing an additional $13,388,534. In its third weekend, the film dropped to number five, grossing $8,575,214. In its fourth weekend, the film stayed at number five, grossing $7,751,705.

=== Accolades ===
Planes was nominated to the BAFTA Kid's Vote for films at the British Academy Children's Awards.

== Music ==
Planes (Original Motion Picture Soundtrack)

Soundtrack album by Mark Mancina
- Released: August 6, 2013
- Recorded: 2013
- Genre: Film score
- Length: 53:24
- Label: Walt Disney

Mark Mancina film scores chronology
Penthouse North (2013)	Planes (Original Motion Picture Soundtrack) (2013)	Planes: Fire & Rescue (2014)

In February 2012, it was revealed that James Seymour Brett would compose the film's score. However, in May 2013, he was replaced by Mark Mancina, who took over scoring duties. The soundtrack was released by Walt Disney Records on August 6, 2013.

== Video game ==
Disney Interactive released Disney Planes, a video game based on the film, on August 6, 2013. It was released on Wii U, Wii, Nintendo 3DS and Nintendo DS. A version for Windows PCs was also released on the same day.

== Sequel ==
A sequel, titled Planes: Fire & Rescue, was theatrically released on July 18, 2014. Bobs Gannaway, co-creator of Jake and the Never Land Pirates and co-director of Secret of the Wings, directed the film. Dane Cook reprised his role of Dusty, and was joined by Julie Bowen as the voice of Lil' Dipper. Rather than publishing an Art of book for Planes, Chronicle Books published The Art of Planes 1 & 2 alongside the sequel's theatrical release. The music for the film was again composed by Mark Mancina.
