= Cars: Radiator Springs Adventures =

2006 video game

- Developer: AWE Games
- Publisher: THQ
- Designer: Jordan Itkowitz
- Series: Cars
- Platforms: Microsoft Windows; Mac OS X
- Release: NA: June 6, 2006; AU: June 24, 2006; EU: July 4, 2006; UK: July 14, 2006
- Genres: Adventure, racing
- Mode: Single-player

Cars: Radiator Springs Adventures is a 2006 video game published by THQ. The game is based on the 2006 film Cars. It was released for Microsoft Windows and Mac OS X in June 2006. In contrast to the film's main tie-in game, the game does not feature a main storyline and the player is instead given several minigames to complete. The player controls the film's protagonist Lightning McQueen as he participates on the different activities featuring the various residents of Radiator Springs.

Unlike its primary counterpart, Radiator Springs Adventures does not feature the return of the entirety of the film's voice talent, with Owen Wilson and Paul Newman being replaced by Keith Ferguson and Corey Burton, respectively.

== Gameplay ==
In the game, the player controls Lightning McQueen. Unlike the film's main tie-in game (which is an open world racing game), Radiator Springs Adventures does not feature a main storyline and is instead a minigame compilation featuring the various residents of Radiator Springs. The 10 minigames included range from a rhythm game featuring Ramone (Hip-Hop it Up) to tipping tractors with Mater (Tractor Roundup). After completing every minigame, the player will unlock "Legends Races", in which they will face a given character. Unlocked in a linear progression, the 10 Legends Races conclude with McQueen facing his arch-rival, Chick Hicks.

The player can unlock liveries for McQueen by surpassing their fastest time on a given activity. Clips from the film are also unlockable by meeting specific criteria.

== Notes ==
1. Rainbow Studios' Cars video game (released as and widely considered to be the film's main tie-in game) was released on June 6, 2006 alongside Radiator Springs Adventures.
