= The Way We Weren't =

- The Simpsons episode
- Episode no.: Season 15; Episode 20
- Directed by: Mike B. Anderson
- Written by: J. Stewart Burns
- Production code: FABF13
- Original air date: May 9, 2004

Episode features
- Couch gag: The Simpsons sit on the couch as normal. From offscreen, someone hurls knives at the Simpsons' heads, but only hit the sides. Homer tries to get a bowl of chips, but a knife stops him.
- Commentary: Al Jean; J. Stewart Burns; Ian Maxtone-Graham; Matt Selman; Tim Long; Brian Kelley; Tom Gammill; Max Pross; Mike B. Anderson

Episode chronology
← Previous "Simple Simpson"	Next → "Bart-Mangled Banner"
- The Simpsons season 15

"The Way We Weren't" is the twentieth episode of the fifteenth season of the American animated television series The Simpsons. It originally aired on the Fox network in the United States on May 9, 2004. The episode was written by J. Stewart Burns and directed by Mike B. Anderson.

In this episode, Homer recalls his first kiss as a ten-year-old with an anonymous girl, but Marge says that the kiss was with her and that he broke her heart. The episode received mixed reviews.

== Plot ==
Bart and Milhouse steal a bottle of beer to play spin the bottle with neighborhood girls. Homer interrupts the game. The Simpson family holds a trial to determine Bart's guilt. Bart doubts that Homer never kissed a girl as a ten-year-old, but Marge states that Homer's first kiss was with her in high school. Homer confesses that his first kiss was with another girl. Homer recalls that when he was Bart's age, he went to a camp for underprivileged boys. The campers were forced to work in the kitchen of the neighboring girls' camp. Homer found a retainer left behind on a tray and returned it to its owner using the dumbwaiter. Through the wall, the girl asked Homer to see her later that night, but he accidentally stabbed himself in the eye and wore an eyepatch to the date. Marge reveals that the girl was her and that Homer broke her heart, and she says she would never have married Homer if she had known.

Marge gives her side of the story. She attended a camp to learn etiquette. She fell for the boy who returned her retainer, but, embarrassed by his real name, Homer gave a false name. While ironing her hair for the date, Marge accidentally burned it and became a brunette for the evening. She and Homer met and shared a passionate kiss. Homer gave Marge a heart-shaped rock, and they parted ways and agreed to meet again the following night. However, Homer did not appear for the second date, and Marge was unable to trust another boy for years.

Homer explains what happened. After the date, he was so happy that he accidentally fell off a cliff into the lake and drifted to a fat camp. He was caught by the camp instructor, who mistook him for a camper. Meanwhile, a devastated Marge decided to leave her camp and threw the heart-shaped rock away, breaking it in two. Homer escaped the fat camp but arrived at Marge's camp after she left. Despite knowing the truth, Marge cannot let go of the heartache. However, Homer proves that he truly cared about her by showing her half of the broken rock that he found. Marge reveals that she kept the other half to remind her how hurtful men can be, but she forgives Homer. They put the rock together to form a heart and share a passionate kiss.

== Reception ==
=== Viewing figures ===
The episode earned a 2.4 rating and was watched by 6.64 million viewers, which was the 61st most-watched show that week.

=== Critical response ===
Colin Jacobson of DVD Movie Guide did not like the change in continuity, saying "[t]hough I don't expect stellar continuity from The Simpsons, the way it blatantly disregards established history can become obnoxious; 'Weren't' dances all over all sorts of previously determined concepts, and that makes it less enjoyable."

On Four Finger Discount, Guy Davis and Brendan Dando said the episode was not a "world-beater" but enjoyed it. They acknowledged the difficulty of writing flashback episodes but thought there was not a major change in continuity.

The episode was part of a DVD boxed set release called The Simpsons Kiss and Tell: The Story of Their Love, and in his review of the release, Andy Dougan of the Evening Times characterized the episode along with "Natural Born Kissers", "Large Marge", and "Three Gays of the Condo", as "four of the funniest episodes of recent series".

=== Themes and analysis ===
The portrayal of Comic Book Guy in the flashback is cited as an example of the typical characteristic of male fans. Mel Stanfill writes, "Beyond insufficient capacity for violence, lack physical fitness is treated as a fundamental fan trait. ...Certainly much of the humor of the Simpsons' Comic Book Guy comes from how he waddles and wobbles, his constant eating, or jokes like him sweating through his jumpsuit with half a jumping jack at fat camp".

=== Awards and nominations ===
This episode was nominated for the Primetime Emmy Award for Outstanding Animated Program (for programming less than one hour) at the 56th Primetime Emmy Awards.
