= The World of Cars Online =

2010 video game

- Developer: The Walt Disney Company
- Publisher: The Walt Disney Company
- Series: Cars
- Engine: Adobe Flash Player
- Platforms: Microsoft Windows, Mac OS X
- Release: June 29, 2010
- Genres: Massively multiplayer online, racing
- Mode: Multiplayer

The World of Cars Online was a massively multiplayer online racing game based on the Cars film series. The game was under development with Open Beta, which launched on March 1, 2010. There was a sneak peek of the World of Cars called the Test Track which started in October 2008 and ended in November 2009 to make way for Open Beta. The site launched on June 29, 2010. Each car was given 2,010 coins, an Open Beta Participant Badge, and a Founder Badge. The game was closed down by Disney on February 8, 2012.

== Gameplay ==
The World of Cars Online allowed users to customize their own cars, chat with other players, decorate their own yards, race against friends, and complete different quests with all of their favorite movie characters. There were also different mini-games to earn coins such as Mater's Tractor Tipping. As users explored and played games, they earned badges such as a Tractor Tipping Badge. The website also hinted that it might be possible to be other vehicles like trains and fire trucks.

Racing was a main component of the World of Cars Online. Besides racing for different quests against computer players, users were able to participate in multi-player racing against friends. Hazards were used to slow down other players behind you. Examples of Hazards would be an oil spill and a hay bale. Different Hazards were available to obtain from Sarge.
