= Cars (franchise) =

Disney and Pixar media franchise

- Logo for the first film
- Created by: John Lasseter; Joe Ranft; Jorgen Klubien
- Developed by: Dan Fogelman John Lasseter Joe Ranft Kiel Murray Phil Lorin Jorgen Klubien
- Original work: Cars (2006)
- Owner: Pixar Animation Studios (The Walt Disney Company)
- Years: 2006–present

Films and television
- Films: Cars film series: Cars (2006); Cars 2 (2011); Cars 3 (2017); Planes spin-off series: Planes (2013); Planes: Fire & Rescue (2014)
- Short films: Cars short film series: Mater and the Ghostlight (2006); Miss Fritter's Racing Skoool (2017); Dancing with the Cars (2021); Unparalleled Parking (2021); Planes short film series: Vitaminamulch: Air Spectacular (2014)
- Animated series: Cars Toons (2008–2014); Cars on the Road (2022); Cars: Lightning Racers (2027)

Games
- Video games: Cars (2006); Cars: Radiator Springs Adventures (2006); Cars Mater-National Championship (2007); Cars Race-O-Rama (2009); The World of Cars Online (2010–2012); Cars Toons: Mater's Tall Tales (2010); Cars 2 (2011); Rush: A Disney–Pixar Adventure (2012)^{**}; Disney Infinity (2013)^{**}; Cars 3: Driven to Win (2017)

Audio
- Soundtracks: Cars (2006); Cars 2 (2011); Cars 3 (2017)
- Original music: "Real Gone"; "Our Town"; "Ride"

Miscellaneous
- Theme park attractions: Cars Quatre Roues Rallye (2007–present); Radiator Springs Racers (2012–present); Luigi's Flying Tires (2012–2015); Luigi's Rollickin' Roadsters (2016–present); Lightning McQueen's Racing Academy (2019–2024); Cars Road Trip (2021–present)
- Themed area: Cars Land (2012–present)
- ^{**} Work where this franchise's characters or settings appeared as part of a crossover.

Cars is a Pixar media franchise owned by The Walt Disney Company. Created by John Lasseter, Joe Ranft and Jorgen Klubien, it began in 2006 with the release of the animated feature film of the same name, The film was followed by the sequels Cars 2 (2011) and Cars 3 (2017). The now-defunct Disneytoon Studios produced the two spin-off films Planes (2013) and Planes: Fire & Rescue (2014).

The first two Cars films were directed by Lasseter, then-chief creative officer of Pixar, Walt Disney Animation Studios, and Disneytoon Studios, while Cars 3 was directed by Brian Fee, a storyboard artist on the previous installments. Lasseter served as executive producer of Cars 3 and the Planes films. Together, all three Cars films have accrued over $1.4 billion in box office revenue worldwide while the franchise has amassed over $10 billion in merchandising sales within its first five years.

== History ==
The Cars franchise began in 2006 with the original same name. At the time, it was Pixar's least well received film by reviewers.

The short Mater and the Ghostlight was released as an extra on the Cars DVD on November 7, 2006. A series of shorts called Cars Toons were produced and aired on the Disney Channel to keep interest up. The brand had sold nearly $10 billion in merchandise by the time of the release of Cars 2 in 2011. Cars 2 became Pixar's lowest-reviewed film at that point in time.

In 2007, Cars Four Wheels Rally ride opened at Disney Adventure World.

In the summer of 2012, the 12-acre Cars Land theme area opened at Disney California Adventure in Anaheim as the main component of $1-billion park renovation.

A third film, Cars 3, was announced on October 8, 2015, and was released on June 16, 2017.

Three animated TV shows have been released that take place in the Cars universe: Cars Toons, Cars on the Road, and the upcoming Cars: Lightning Racers.

== Films ==
Film	Release date	Director	Screenwriter(s)	Story by	Producer
Main films
Cars	June 9, 2006	John Lasseter	Dan Fogelman, John Lasseter, Joe Ranft, Kiel Murray, Phil Lorin & Jorgen Klubien	John Lasseter, Joe Ranft & Jorgen Klubien	Darla K. Anderson
Cars 2	June 24, 2011	John Lasseter	Ben Queen	John Lasseter, Brad Lewis & Dan Fogelman	Denise Ream
Cars 3	June 16, 2017	Brian Fee	Kiel Murray, Bob Peterson & Mike Rich	Brian Fee, Ben Queen, Eyal Podell & Jonathan E. Stewart	Kevin Reher
Spin-offs
Planes	August 9, 2013	Klay Hall	Jeffrey M. Howard	John Lasseter, Klay Hall & Jeffrey M. Howard	Traci Balthazor-Flynn
Planes: Fire & Rescue	July 18, 2014	Bobs Gannaway	Bobs Gannaway & Jeffrey M. Howard	Bobs Gannaway & Jeffrey M. Howard	Ferrell Barron

=== Cars (2006) ===
Cars is the seventh Pixar film. The story is about rookie race car Lightning McQueen (Owen Wilson), who gets lost on the way to California for a tiebreaker race in the Piston Cup, a famous race worldwide, and ends up in a little town called Radiator Springs on Route 66, that had been bypassed and forgotten when Interstate 40 was built. He accidentally wrecks the road and is sentenced to fix it. During his time there, he meets Mater (Larry the Cable Guy), who becomes his best friend, and falls in love with Sally (Bonnie Hunt). He also comes across Doc Hudson (Paul Newman), who used to be a famous racecar called the Hudson Hornet until a career-ending crash in 1954, and who resents Lightning for reminding him of his own past.

After Lightning fixes the road, Doc secretly alerts the media about Lightning's presence to get rid of him, but Sally makes Doc realize how much Lightning has helped Radiator Springs. Doc convinces most of the Radiator Springs residents to become Lightning's pit crew, and reassumes his Hudson Hornet identity and acts as Lightning's crew chief. Lightning is about to win the race, but helps The King (Richard Petty) cross the finish line after Chick Hicks (Michael Keaton) causes him to crash. Chick wins the Piston Cup after being in third on the last lap, but is later booed by everyone, while Lightning receives praise for his sportsmanship.

Despite his loss, Lightning is offered to be the new face and sponsor of Dinoco, but he declines and decides to stay with Rust-eze, his current sponsor. He does, however, arrange for Mater to ride in the Dinoco helicopter just as he promised. The film ends with Lightning setting up his racing headquarters in Radiator Springs, thereby putting it back on the map.

=== Cars 2 (2011) ===
Cars 2 is the twelfth Pixar film. The story starts with Lightning McQueen competing in the World Grand Prix, organized by Sir Miles Axlerod (Eddie Izzard), a three-race event taking place in three countries: Japan, Italy, and England, with his racing rival being Italian formula car Francesco Bernoulli (John Turturro).

Along the way, Mater is mistaken for an American spy by British spy Finn McMissile (Michael Caine), and falls in love with junior agent Holley Shiftwell (Emily Mortimer). The three uncover a plot to sabotage the World Grand Prix, which is seemingly led by Professor Zündapp (Thomas Kretschmann) and a group of lemon cars. When the event reaches its conclusion in London, Mater deduces that Axlerod is the mastermind behind the plot, as he started the event in the first place to turn the world against alternative fuels and profit from his ownership of the world's oil reserves, while also taking revenge for the lemons' blistered reputation.

With the plot foiled, Mater is knighted by the Queen of the United Kingdom (Vanessa Redgrave), and a new race is held in Radiator Springs. Mater is invited by Finn and Holley to go on another mission, but he declines. While his weapons get confiscated, he gets to keep the rocket engines he acquired, as the two agents take off in Siddeley (Jason Isaacs), the British spy jet.

=== Cars 3 (2017) ===
Cars 3 is the eighteenth Pixar film. The story focuses on Lightning McQueen, now a veteran, dealing with a new generation of race cars taking over the world of racing. Jackson Storm (Armie Hammer) is an arrogant high-tech racer who leads the next generation. As everyone begins to ask him if he might retire, Lightning struggles with keeping up with these racers and during the final race of the season, he suffers a violent crash.

Four months later, a recovering Lightning mourns the late Doc Hudson and travels to the new Rust-eze Racing Center, now under the management of Sterling (Nathan Fillion). Sterling assigns Cruz Ramirez (Cristela Alonzo) to train him on the simulator, which Lightning accidentally destroys after losing control. Cruz's unconventional training methods and lack of racing experience frustrate Lightning, as they race on beaches and a demolition derby. Cruz reveals that she had always wanted to be a racer but never found the confidence to do so. In Thomasville, they encounter Doc's old crew chief Smokey (Chris Cooper), who trains Lightning and explains to him that Doc found happiness in mentoring him. Smokey's training methods inspire Cruz as well.

At the Florida 500, Lightning begins racing, but remembers Cruz's racing dreams and has her take his place in the race. Using what she has learned on the road, Cruz finds the confidence to catch up to Storm. She wins the race along with Lightning and begins racing for Dinoco, whose owner, Tex, purchases Rust-eze. Under the merged Dinoco–Rust-eze brand, Cruz becomes a racer, sporting #51, and Lightning decides to continue racing, with a new paint job in memory of Doc Hudson, but trains Cruz first for the season.

=== Future ===
Regarding a possible Cars 4, Cars 3 producers Kevin Reher and Andrea Warren told CinemaBlend that "[i]f there's a good story to tell I mean our heads kinda break after having gotten this one done, like oh my God, what could you do the further adventures of? But like any sequel, from Toy Story 4 to Incredibles 2, as long as there's a good story to tell, it's worth investing; we do love these characters, we love them as much as the public does." Regarding which character would be the main protagonist in the movie, Reher and Warren stated that "if Cruz is a breakout character, kind of like Mater was", "she [would] be involved in a 4". Owen Wilson stated at a Cars 3 press event that possible stories have been discussed for a Cars 4, though he would personally like for a fourth Cars movie to delve into aspects of the thriller genre, akin to Cars 2. In an interview with Screen Rant, Lea Delaria expressed interest in reprising her role as Miss Fritter while promoting the release of the short movie Miss Fritter's Racing Skoool with the Cars 3 DVD and Blu-ray release.

In December 2023, it was revealed that Pixar is working on new media related to the franchise. During an interview at the 2023 Porsche Rennsport Reunion Event, the creative director of the saga, Jay Ward, revealed that they are developing new projects related to the franchise: "There are more Cars things brewing, I can't say much more yet. Cars has got a life that will keep going. I am working on some real fun projects right now that you will see in a couple of years. It takes us a while to make them."

== Cars television series ==
=== Cars Toons ===
==== Cars Toons: Mater's Tall Tales (2008–2012) ====
Mater's Tall Tales is a series of short animated films featuring Mater, Lightning McQueen, and their friends. The first three shorts premiered on October 27, 2008, on Toon Disney, Disney Channel, and ABC Family. Not exclusive to television, the episodes have also been released on DVDs/Blu-rays or as in front of theatrical films. A total of 11 episodes have been released with Time Travel Mater (2012) being the most recent.

All shorts in the series follow the same tall-tale formula: Mater tells a story of something he has done in the past. When Lightning questions Mater over whether the events in the story actually occurred (or in some episodes asks him what he did next), Mater always claimed that Lightning was also involved and continues the story including Lightning's sudden participation. The shorts end with Mater leaving the scene, often followed by characters or references to the story that was being told, suggesting that story might be real.

==== Cars Toons: Tales from Radiator Springs (2013–2014) ====
Tales from Radiator Springs is a series of short animated films featuring the various residents of the titular location. The first three two-minute episodes - Hiccups, Bugged, and Spinning - premiered on March 22, 2013, on Disney Channel, and have been available online since March 24, 2013. A fourth short in the series, titled The Radiator Springs 500 ½, was released in spring 2014 on the digital movie service Disney Movies Anywhere. It premiered on August 1, 2014, on Disney Channel. The short has a running time of 6 minutes rather than the usual two-minute running time.

=== Cars on the Road (2022) ===
On December 10, 2020, during Disney's Investors Day event, Pixar announced that an animated series starring Lightning McQueen and Mater traveling the country while meeting friends, new and old, was in development. On November 12, 2021, it was announced that the show would be titled Cars on the Road, and that Owen Wilson and Larry the Cable Guy would reprise their respective roles as Lightning McQueen and Mater. It was released on Disney+ on September 8, 2022, as part of Disney+ Day.

=== Cars: Lightning Racers (2027) ===
On August 8, 2025, a new series titled Cars: Lightning Racers was announced for Disney Jr., executive produced by Travis Braun and Frank Montagna. It will follow Lightning McQueen on new adventures in Radiator Springs alongside Mater and new friends, thrill-seeking drag car Pipes and mud-loving monster truck Miles. The films' original cast members returning to reprise their roles include Owen Wilson as Lightning McQueen and Larry the Cable Guy as Mater. It is set to premiere in July 2027.

== Cars short films ==
=== Mater and the Ghostlight (2006) ===
Mater and the Ghostlight is a 2006 Pixar animated short created for the DVD of the 2006 film Cars, which was released on October 25, 2006, in Australia and the United States on November 7, 2006. The short, set in the Cars world, tells a story of Mater being haunted by a mysterious blue light.

=== Miss Fritter's Racing Skoool (2017) ===
Miss Fritter's Racing Skoool is a 2017 Pixar animated short created for the Blu-ray, 4K Ultra HD and DVD of Cars 3, which was released in the United States on November 7, 2017. The short, set in the Cars world, follows the "blindsided testimonials from the Crazy 8's, touting the transformative impact Miss Fritter's Racing School has had in reshaping the direction of their lives".

=== Pixar Popcorn shorts ===
In December 2020, two Cars short films were announced as part of Disney+'s Pixar Popcorn series, which was released on January 22, 2021. As with most of the shorts present in this series, none of the characters have voice roles.

==== Unparalleled Parking (2021) ====
In this short, the cars have a friendly parallel parking competition.

==== Dancing with the Cars (2021) ====
In this short, the residents of Radiator Springs show off their dancing skills at Flo's V8 Café.

=== LEGO Pixar: BrickToons ===
On September 4, 2024, a series of LEGO short films based on some Pixar films, was released on Disney+. The series included an episode related to Cars, called "Trust Yer Ol' Pal Mater". In celebration of Lightning McQueen Day on September 5, the episode was released on the Disney Jr. YouTube channel, and received 1.6 million views in its first two weeks.

== Planes film series ==
In 2013, Disneytoon Studios, Pixar's now-defunct sister company, released a spin-off film set in the Cars world titled Planes featuring planes as the main characters. The film was followed by a sequel titled Planes: Fire & Rescue in 2014.

=== Planes (2013) ===
Planes is an animated Cars spin-off film produced by Disneytoon Studios. The first film in a planned duology where the main characters are planes, the film was released in theaters by Walt Disney Pictures on August 9, 2013. The film was directed by Klay Hall and executive produced by John Lasseter. In the film, Dusty Crophopper, a small-town cropdusting plane, follows his dreams by competing in a world air race despite his fear of heights.

=== Planes: Fire & Rescue (2014) ===
A sequel to Planes, titled Planes: Fire & Rescue, was theatrically released on July 18, 2014. This film is also produced by Disneytoon Studios. Bobs Gannaway, co-developer of Jake and the Never Land Pirates and Mickey Mouse Clubhouse, and co-director of Mickey Mouse Works and Secret of the Wings, directed the film. Lasseter again served as executive producer. In the film, Dusty is now a world-famous air racer, but learns he will never be able to race again due to an engine problem. After accidentally starting a fire, Dusty decides to become a firefighter and trains at Piston Peak Air Attack.

== Planes short film ==
=== Vitaminamulch: Air Spectacular (2014) ===
A Planes short film titled Vitaminamulch: Air Spectacular was released on the DVD and Blu-ray of Planes: Fire & Rescue. It was directed by Dan Abraham and executive produced by John Lasseter. In the short film, Dusty Crophopper and Chug need to replace two daredevils in an airshow Leadbottom is hosting. At first unsuccessful, Dusty and Chug accidentally start a series of events that captures the audience's attention, eventually completing the stunt.

== Cancelled projects ==
=== To Protect and Serve ===
A fifth Tales from Radiator Springs short film, titled To Protect and Serve, was announced to be in development for a 2015 release. However, it was never released.

The short would have been focused on Sheriff as he takes a mandatory vacation and leaves two rookies Didi 05 and Mike 07 (voiced by Wendi McLendon-Covey and Aziz Ansari) to take over his duties as police officer. This, however, causes problems in Radiator Springs as the rookies over-do every aspect of their job in an attempt to score commendations, turning the town into a hotbed of taped-off crime scenes. Sheriff soon senses an imbalance and returns home to right the "justice" that has been served.

=== Untitled Planes sequel and spin-offs ===
At the D23 Expo in July 2017, John Lasseter announced a third film in the Planes series. Tentatively titled Beyond the Sky, (Note: The film never officially received this title. Beyond the Sky was its name internally, but this was never made public in the time between its announcement and Disneytoon's closure.) the film would have explored the future of aviation in outer space. The film had a release date of April 12, 2019. It was removed from the release schedule in March 2018, and on June 28, 2018, Disneytoon Studios was shut down, ending development on the film.

Prior to its closure, the studio was planning several more spin-offs of the franchise focusing on boats, trains and other vehicles. In November 2022, concept art for one of the proposed films, tentatively titled Metro, was leaked online.

== Reception ==
=== Box-office performance ===
Earning over $1.7 billion, Cars, including its Planes spin-off films, is the sixteenth-highest grossing animated franchise as of August 2025.

In its opening weekend, the original Cars earned $60,119,509 in 3,985 theaters in the United States, ranking number one at the box office. In the United States, the film held onto the number one spot for two weeks before being surpassed by Click, and then by Superman Returns the following weekend. It went on to gross $461,983,149 worldwide (ranking number six in 2006 films) and $244,082,982 in the United States (the third-highest-grossing film of 2006 in the country, behind Pirates of the Caribbean: Dead Man's Chest and Night at the Museum). It was the highest grossing animated film of 2006 in the United States, but lost to Ice Age: The Meltdown in worldwide totals.

Cars 2 has earned $191,452,396 in the United States and Canada, and $368,400,000 in other territories, for a worldwide total of $559,852,396. Worldwide on its opening weekend, it made $109.0 million, marking the largest opening weekend for a 2011 animated title.

Film	Release date	Box office gross			Box office ranking		Budget	Ref.
Film	Release date	North America	Other territories	Worldwide	All time North America	All time worldwide	Budget	Ref.
Cars	June 9, 2006	$244,082,982	$218,133,298	$462,216,280	#115	#203	$120 million	
Cars 2	June 24, 2011	$191,452,396	$370,658,161	$562,110,557	#197	#145	$200 million	
Cars 3	June 16, 2017	$152,901,115	$230,988,036	$383,889,151	#319	#272	$175 million	
Cars films		$588,436,493	$819,779,495	$1,408,215,988			$495 million	
Planes	August 9, 2013	$90,256,456	$148,970,000	$239,258,712	#766	#556	$50 million	
Planes: Fire & Rescue	July 18, 2014	$59,165,787	$92,220,853	$151,386,640	#1,315		$50 million	
Planes films		$149,422,243	$241,190,853	$390,645,352			$100 million	
Total		$737,858,736	$1,060,970,348	$1,798,861,340			$595 million	
List indicator: A dark grey cell indicates the information is not available for the film.

=== Critical and public response ===
Film	Critical		Public
Film	Rotten Tomatoes	Metacritic	CinemaScore
Cars	75% (201 reviews)	73 (39 reviews)	A
Cars 2	40% (216 reviews)	57 (38 reviews)	A−
Planes	26% (121 reviews)	39 (32 reviews)	A−
Planes: Fire & Rescue	44% (93 reviews)	48 (29 reviews)	A
Cars 3	70% (233 reviews)	59 (41 reviews)	A

=== Awards and nominations ===
The first Cars film had a highly successful run during the 2006 awards season. Many film critic associations such as the Broadcast Film Critics Association and the National Board of Review named it the best Animated Feature Film of 2006. Cars also received the title of Best Reviewed Animated Feature of 2006 from Rotten Tomatoes. Randy Newman and James Taylor received a Grammy Award for the song "Our Town", which later went on to be nominated for the Academy Award for Best Original Song (an award it lost to "I Need to Wake Up" from An Inconvenient Truth). The film also earned an Oscar nomination for Best Animated Feature, but it lost to Happy Feet. Cars was also selected as the Favorite Family Movie at the 33rd People's Choice Awards. The most prestigious award that Cars received was the inaugural Golden Globe Award for Best Animated Feature Film. Cars also won the highest award for animation in 2006, the Best Animated Feature Annie Award. The film was also nominated for AFI's 10 Top 10 in the "Animation" genre.

== Cast and characters ==
List indicators

This section includes characters who have appeared in the series.

- An empty grey cell indicates the character was not in the film.
- ^{A} indicates an appearance through archival footage or audio.

This is a list of characters from the 2006 film Cars, its 2011 and 2017 sequels Cars 2 and Cars 3, its 2013 and 2014 spin-off films Planes and Planes: Fire & Rescue, its 2006 and 2017 short films Mater and the Ghostlight and Miss Fritter's Racing Skoool, its 2014 spin-off short film Vitaminamulch: Air Spectacular, and its 2008–2014, 2022 and 2027 television series Cars Toons, Cars on the Road and Cars: Lightning Racers.

Characters	Cars film series			Short films				Television series			Planes film series	
Characters	Cars	Cars 2	Cars 3	Mater and the Ghostlight	Vitaminamulch: Air Spectacular	Miss Fritter's Racing Skoool	Lego Pixar: Bricktoons	Cars Toons	Cars on the Road	Cars: Lightning Racers	Planes	Planes: Fire & Rescue
Lightning McQueen	Owen Wilson	Owen Wilson	Owen Wilson	Owen Wilson		Keith Ferguson	Owen Wilson	Keith Ferguson	Owen Wilson	Owen Wilson		Photograph
Lightning McQueen	Owen Wilson	Owen Wilson	Owen Wilson	Owen Wilson		Keith Ferguson	Owen Wilson	Owen Wilson	Owen Wilson	Owen Wilson		Photograph
Sir Tow Mater	Larry the Cable Guy	Larry the Cable Guy	Larry the Cable Guy	Larry the Cable Guy		Silent role	Larry the Cable Guy	Larry the Cable Guy	Larry the Cable Guy	Larry the Cable Guy		
Doc Hudson The Fabulous Hudson Hornet	Paul Newman	Photograph	Paul Newman^{A}	Paul Newman								
Sally Carrera	Bonnie Hunt	Bonnie Hunt	Bonnie Hunt	Bonnie Hunt				Bonnie Hunt	Bonnie Hunt	Bonnie Hunt		
Luigi	Tony Shalhoub	Tony Shalhoub	Tony Shalhoub	Silent role		Silent role		Tony Shalhoub	Tony Shalhoub	Tony Shalhoub		
Guido	Guido Quaroni	Guido Quaroni	Guido Quaroni	Silent role		Silent role		Guido Quaroni	Guido Quaroni	Guido Quaroni		
Ramone	Cheech Marin	Cheech Marin	Cheech Marin	Cheech Marin			Cheech Marin	Cheech Marin	Cheech Marin	Cheech Marin		
Flo	Jenifer Lewis	Jenifer Lewis	Jenifer Lewis	Silent role				Jenifer Lewis	Jenifer Lewis	Jenifer Lewis		
Sarge	Paul Dooley	Paul Dooley	Paul Dooley	Paul Dooley				Paul Dooley	Silent role	Paul Dooley		Photograph
Fillmore	George Carlin	Lloyd Sherr	Lloyd Sherr	Silent role				George Carlin (Note: George Carlin, who died in the year 2008, appears in episode "Unidentified Flying Mater" through the use of unused recordings from the first film.)	Lloyd Sherr	Lloyd Sherr		
Fillmore	George Carlin	Lloyd Sherr	Lloyd Sherr	Silent role				Lloyd Sherr	Lloyd Sherr	Lloyd Sherr		
Sheriff	Michael Wallis	Michael Wallis	Michael Wallis	Michael Wallis				Michael Wallis	Silent role	Michael Wallis		
Lizzie	Katherine Helmond	Katherine Helmond	Katherine Helmond	Silent role				Katherine Helmond	Silent role			
Red	Joe Ranft	Silent role	Jerome Ranft	Silent role				Jerome Ranft	Silent role			
Mack	John Ratzenberger	John Ratzenberger	John Ratzenberger	Silent role					Silent role	John Ratzenberger		
Darrell Cartrip	Darrell Waltrip	Darrell Waltrip	Darrell Waltrip									
Van	Richard Kind	Richard Kind										
Minny	Edie McClurg	Edie McClurg										
Bob Cutlass	Bob Costas	Deleted scene	Bob Costas									
Strip "The King" Weathers	Richard Petty		Richard Petty									
Chick Hicks	Michael Keaton		Bob Peterson							Bob Peterson		
Tex Dinoco	Humpy Wheeler		Humpy Wheeler									
Rusty Rust-eze	Tom Magliozzi		Tom Magliozzi (Note: Tom Magliozzi, who died in the year 2014, appears in Cars 3 through the use of unused recordings from the first film.)									
Dusty Rust-eze	Ray Magliozzi		Ray Magliozzi									
Mia	Lindsey Collins	Uncredited voice actress						Lindsey Collins				
Tia	Elissa Knight	Uncredited voice actress						Elissa Knight				
DJ	E.J. Holowicki							Unspecified voice actor				
Wingo	Adrian Ochoa							Unspecified voice actor				
Boost	Jonas Rivera							Unspecified voice actor				
Sheriff Woody	Tom Hanks											
Buzz Lightyear	Tim Allen											
Hamm	John Ratzenberger											
Flik	Dave Foley											
P.T. Flea	John Ratzenberger											
Mike Wazowski	Billy Crystal							Silent cameo				
Sulley	John Goodman							Silent cameo				
Yeti	John Ratzenberger											
Lynda "Mrs. The King" Weathers	Lynda Petty											
Junior	Dale Earnhardt Jr.											
Mario Andretti	Mario Andretti											
Fred	Andrew Stanton											
Michael Schumacher	Michael Schumacher											
Snot Rod	Lou Romano											
Kori Turbowitz	Sarah Clark											
Harv	Jeremy Piven											
Harv	Jeremy Clarkson (Note: Replaces Piven in the UK version of the film.)											
Finn McMissile	Deleted scene	Michael Caine										
Holley Shiftwell		Emily Mortimer										
Francesco Bernoulli		John Turturro										
Sir Miles Axlerod		Eddie Izzard	Photograph									
Professor Zündapp		Thomas Kretschmann										
Grem		Joe Mantegna										
Acer		Peter Jacobson	Photograph									
Brent Mustangburger		Brent Musburger									Brent Musburger	Brent Musburger
Lewis Hamilton		Lewis Hamilton										
Siddeley		Jason Isaacs									Silent cameo	Silent cameo
Victor Hugo		Stanley Townsend										
Ivan		Stanley Townsend										
Vladimir Trunkov		Stanley Townsend										
Tubbs Pacer		Brad Lewis										
J. Curby Gremlin		John Mainieri										
Rod "Torque" Redline		Bruce Campbell										
Tomber		Michel Michelis										
Mama Topolino		Vanessa Redgrave (US)										
Mama Topolino		Sophia Loren (IT)										
Uncle Topolino		Franco Nero										
John Lassetire		John Lasseter										
David Hobbscap		David Hobbs										
Crabby the Boat		Sig Hansen										
The Queen		Vanessa Redgrave										
Otis		Jeff Garlin										
Tony Trihull		Lloyd Sherr										
Jeff Gorvette		Jeff Gordon	Jeff Gordon									
Colin Cowling		Colin Cowherd (US)									Colin Cowherd (US)	
Lofty Crofty											David Croft (UK)	
Carla Veloso		Claudia Leitte (BR only)										
Cruz Ramirez			Cristela Alonzo			Cristela Alonzo			Cristela Alonzo			
Smokey			Chris Cooper									
Jackson Storm			Armie Hammer			Archive footage						
Sterling			Nathan Fillion									
Miss Fritter			Lea DeLaria			Lea DeLaria						
Natalie Certain			Kerry Washington									
River Scott			Isiah Whitlock Jr.									
Junior Moon			Junior Johnson									
Louise Nash			Margo Martindale									
Hamilton			Lewis Hamilton									
Ray Reverham			Ray Evernham									
Dr. Damage			Bob Peterson			Bob Peterson						
Bobby Swift			Angel Oquendo									
Brick Yardley			Diedrich Bader									
Daniel Swervez			Daniel Suárez									
Fare Game			Jason Pace			Jason Pace						
Arvy			Jeremy Maxwell			Jeremy Maxwell						
Ryan "Inside" Laney			Ryan Blaney									
Chase Racelott			Chase Elliott									
Cal Weathers			Kyle Petty									
Bubba Wheelhouse			Bubba Wallace									
Dr. Drippy			Peter Sohn			Silent cameo						
HJ Hollis			Silent cameo				Josh Keaton					
Moe Torrent							Kiff VanderHeuvel					
Robyn Rhode							Misty Lee					
Dusty Crophopper					Dane Cook						Dane Cook	Dane Cook
Skipper Riley					Stacy Keach			Stacy Keach			Stacy Keach	Stacy Keach
Sparky					Danny Mann			Danny Mann			Danny Mann	Danny Mann
Chug					Brad Garrett						Brad Garrett	Brad Garrett
Dottie					Teri Hatcher						Teri Hatcher	Teri Hatcher
Leadbottom					Cedric the Entertainer						Cedric the Entertainer	Cedric the Entertainer
Mayday											Silent role	Hal Holbrook
Roper					Sinbad						Sinbad	
Ivy									Quinta Brunson			
Mato									Dana Powell			
Mateo									Oscar Camacho			
Noriyuki									Masa Kanome			
Speed Demon									Kathy Holly			
Clutch Humboldt									Matt Yang King			
Margaret Motorray									Toks Olagundoye			
Griswold									Gabby Sanalitro			
Bella Cadavre									Megan Cavanagh			
Cap'n Long Leggy									Thomas Bromhead			
Chieftess									Toks Olagundoye			
Ishani											Priyanka Chopra	
Ripslinger											Roger Craig Smith	Archive footage
El Chupacabra											Carlos Alazraqui	
Bulldog											John Cleese	
Ned											Gabriel Iglesias	
Zed											Gabriel Iglesias	
Rochelle (US) Carolina (BR)											Julia Louis-Dreyfus (US)	
Rochelle (US) Carolina (BR)											Jessica Marais (AUS and NZ)	
Rochelle (US) Carolina (BR)											Ivete Sangalo (BR)	
Lil' Dipper												Julie Bowen
Blade Ranger												Ed Harris
Dynamite												Regina King
Maru												Curtis Armstrong
Windlifter												Wes Studi
Cabbie												Dale Dye
Cad Spinner												John Michael Higgins
Pulaski												Patrick Warburton

- Note: A grey cell indicates the character was not in the film.

== Crew ==
Role	Main films			Spin-off films	
Role	Cars	Cars 2	Cars 3	Planes	Planes: Fire & Rescue
Director(s)	John Lasseter Co-Director: Joe Ranft	John Lasseter Co-Director: Brad Lewis	Brian Fee	Klay Hall	Bobs Gannaway
Producer	Darla K. Anderson	Denise Ream	Kevin Reher	Traci Balthazor-Flynn	Ferrell Barron
Writer(s)	Screenplay by: Dan Fogelman; John Lasseter; Joe Ranft; Kiel Murray; Phil Lorin; Jorgen Klubien Story by: John Lasseter; Joe Ranft; Jorgen Klubien	Screenplay by: Ben Queen Story by: John Lasseter; Brad Lewis; Dan Fogelman	Screenplay by: Kiel Murray; Bob Peterson; Mike Rich Story by: Brian Fee; Ben Queen; Eyal Podell; Jonathon E. Stewart	Screenplay by: Jeffrey M. Howard Story by: John Lasseter; Klay Hall; Jeffrey M. Howard	Bobs Gannaway; Jeffrey M. Howard
Executive Producer	—N/a	—N/a	John Lasseter	John Lasseter	John Lasseter
Composer	Randy Newman	Michael Giacchino	Randy Newman	Mark Mancina	Mark Mancina
Editor	Ken Schretzmann	Stephen Schaffer	Jason Hudak	Jeremy Milton	Dan Molina
Studio	Pixar Animation Studios	Pixar Animation Studios	Pixar Animation Studios	Disneytoon Studios	Disneytoon Studios
Distributor	Walt Disney Studios Motion Pictures	Walt Disney Studios Motion Pictures	Walt Disney Studios Motion Pictures	Walt Disney Studios Motion Pictures	Walt Disney Studios Motion Pictures
Runtime	1hr 56 min	1hr 46 min	1hr 42 min	1hr 32 min	1hr 24 min

== Other media ==
=== Video games ===
In May 2007, the Cars video game was announced to be a "Platinum Hit" on the Xbox, "Greatest Hit" on the PlayStation 2 and PlayStation Portable, and Player's Choice on the GameCube. Two sequels were released, Cars Mater-National Championship and Cars Race-O-Rama. A video game based on Cars 2 was developed by Avalanche Software and published by Disney Interactive Studios for the PlayStation 3, Xbox 360, Wii, PC, and Nintendo DS on June 21, 2011. The PlayStation 3 version of the game was reported to be compatible with stereoscopic 3D gameplay. In October 2014, Gameloft released Cars: Fast as Lightning, a customizable, city-building and racing game for mobile platforms. The game later had its servers shut down and was discontinued and taken off of app stores in December 2016. Lightning McQueen appears as a playable character in Lego The Incredibles which was released in June 2018, and Rocket League in November 2023.

Video game	Date released	Game system compatible
Cars	NA: October 22, 2006	Xbox 360
Cars	PAL: November 16, 2006	Xbox 360
Cars	AU: November 22, 2006	Xbox 360
Cars	NA: November 15, 2006	Wii
Cars	PAL: December 7, 2006	Wii
Cars	AU: December 13, 2006	Wii
Cars	JP: March 21, 2007	Wii
Cars	NA: June 5, 2006	PS2, PSP, GameCube, Game Boy Advance, Nintendo DS
Cars	JP: July 5, 2006	PS2, PSP, GameCube, Game Boy Advance, Nintendo DS
Cars	PAL: July 13, 2006	PS2, PSP, GameCube, Game Boy Advance, Nintendo DS
Cars	NA: June 5, 2006	Windows, Xbox
Cars	PAL: July 13, 2006	Windows, Xbox
Cars	NA: June 5, 2006	Mac
Cars: Radiator Springs Adventures	NA: June 6, 2006	Windows, Mac
Cars: Radiator Springs Adventures	PAL: July 14, 2006	Windows, Mac
Cars Mater-National Championship	NA: October 29, 2007	Wii, Nintendo DS, PS3, Xbox 360, Game Boy Advance, PS2, Windows
Cars Mater-National Championship	EU: November 30, 2007	Wii, Nintendo DS, PS3, Xbox 360, Game Boy Advance, PS2, Windows
Cars Mater-National Championship	AU: November 29, 2007	Wii, Nintendo DS, PS3, Xbox 360, Game Boy Advance, PS2, Windows
Cars Race-O-Rama	NA: October 12, 2009	Nintendo DS, PS2, PS3, PSP, Wii, Xbox 360
Cars Race-O-Rama	EU: October 30, 2009	Nintendo DS, PS2, PS3, PSP, Wii, Xbox 360
The World of Cars Online	WW: June 29, 2010	Windows, Mac
Cars Toon: Mater's Tall Tales	WW: October 19, 2010	Wii, Windows
Cars 2	NA: June 21, 2011	Mac, Nintendo DS, Nintendo 3DS, PS3, PSP, Wii, iOS, Windows, Xbox 360
Cars 2	AU: June 23, 2011	Mac, Nintendo DS, Nintendo 3DS, PS3, PSP, Wii, iOS, Windows, Xbox 360
Cars 2	EU: July 22, 2011	Mac, Nintendo DS, Nintendo 3DS, PS3, PSP, Wii, iOS, Windows, Xbox 360
Kinect Rush: A Disney-Pixar Adventure	NA: March 20, 2012	Xbox 360
Disney Infinity	NA: August 18, 2013	Wii, Wii U, Xbox 360, PlayStation 3, Nintendo 3DS, Windows
Disney Infinity	EU: August 20, 2013	Wii, Wii U, Xbox 360, PlayStation 3, Nintendo 3DS, Windows
Cars 3: Driven to Win	NA: June 13, 2017	Nintendo Switch, PlayStation 3, PlayStation 4, Wii U, Xbox 360, Xbox One
Cars 3: Driven to Win	PAL: July 14, 2017	Nintendo Switch, PlayStation 3, PlayStation 4, Wii U, Xbox 360, Xbox One
Cars 3: Driven to Win	JP: July 20, 2017	Nintendo Switch, PlayStation 3, PlayStation 4, Wii U, Xbox 360, Xbox One

=== Similar films ===
From the start, at least two inspired or knock off direct to video series appeared, A Cars Life and The Little Cars, that amounted to being mockbusters.

It has also been noted that the plot of Cars bears a striking resemblance to that of Doc Hollywood, the 1991 romantic comedy which stars Michael J. Fox as a hotshot young doctor, who, after causing a traffic accident in a small town, is sentenced to work at the town hospital, falls in love with a local law student and eventually acquires an appreciation for small town values.

==== The Autobots ====
The Autobots was released in July 2015 by Chinese companies Bluemtv and G-Point. On January 1, 2017, Disney and Pixar were awarded damages in their lawsuit against the two companies. The Shanghai Pudong New Area People's Court ruled that the Chinese film titled The Autobots was an illegal copy of Cars thus fined the film's producer and distributor the equivalent of US$194,000. In his defense, director Zhuo Jianrong claimed he had never seen Cars.

==== A Cars Life ====
A Cars Life was a series animated by the UAV Corporation, produced by Spark Plug Entertainment, and distributed by Allumination Filmworks. There were a total of four films issued from 2006 to 2015. The series included A Car's Life: Sparky's Big Adventure (2006), Car's Life 2 (2011), Car's Life: Junkyard Blues (2015), which was made for television, and Car's Life 3: The Royal Heist (2013).

==== The Little Cars ====
The Little Cars is a big series animated by the Toyland Video (Vídeo Brinquedo) and distributed by Branscome International. There were a total of eight films produced in 2006-2007 and released from 2006 to 2011. Toyland Video considers its "mockbuster" to be following a "Bollywood" approach of borrowing from Hollywood.

Marcus Aurelius Canônico of Folha de S.Paulo described The Little Cars series (Os Carrinhos in Portuguese), a Brazilian computer graphics film series, as a derivative of Cars. Canônico discussed whether lawsuits from Pixar would appear. The Brazilian Ministry of Culture posted Marcus Aurelius Canônico's article on its website.

== Merchandising ==
As of 2011, the Cars franchise has grossed over $10 billion in merchandise sales revenue.

The Mattel-produced 1/55 scale Toy Cars were some of the most popular toys of the 2006 Summer Season. Dozens of characters are represented, with some having multiple versions available. Several stores had trouble keeping the toys in stock, and some models are still difficult to find because of being shipped in lower numbers than other characters.

Some online Disney enthusiasts are comparing it to the same shortage that Mattel faced with its Toy Story line in 1995. On August 14, 2007, the die-cast Sarge car, made between May and July 2007, was recalled due to "impermissible levels of lead" used in the paint. Another Cars product which followed the Disney-Pixar Cars Die-Cast Line were miniature versions of the characters which were painted in different colors to represent different events called Mini Adventures. Also, Lego has sets for the sequels.

On June 22, 2006, Disney Consumer Products announced that Cars merchandise broke records for retail sales based on a Disney-Pixar product, recording 10-to-1 more volume than Finding Nemo. DCP reports that product expansion will take place in the fall alongside the DVD release of the film. Mattel has announced that Cars toys will continue through 2008 with the release of at least 80 new vehicles.

A 36 car pack called "Motor Speedway of the South" will feature most of the race cars seen during the opening race sequence of the film. (This is also the name for the track race in the film) Estimates from the New York Daily News indicate that sales of Cars merchandise two weeks out from the release of the film amounted to US$600 million. Estimates put out in November by the Walt Disney Company peg total sales for the brand at around $1 billion.

Kelley Blue Book, a resource for appraising values of vehicles, has humorously "appraised" four of the cars, Lightning McQueen, Mater, Sally Carrera, and Doc Hudson according to their make/model and personalities. The United States Department of Transportation has used scenes from the film in a commercial regarding the Click It or Ticket campaign.

In conjunction with the film's release, a chocolate ice cream on a stick resembling a car tire was released in Australia. These ice creams were called "Burnouts". The naming of the particular product sparked controversy as the name "Burnouts" was believed to have encouraged street racing and committing burnouts. These acts are illegal and heavy fines and convictions are issued to those committing these acts in Australia. It is unknown as to whether the products have been discontinued. In Norway, the candy company Nidar produced candy with the characters on the outer packaging and pictures of the characters on the packaging of the assorted candy on the inside. These bags also came with Cars themed tattoos.

In the U.S., an animated Walmart truck can be seen on a Walmart advertisements for Cars. In the Walmart TV commercial Mater was talking to the Walmart truck. In South Africa, Italy, and several other countries where Opel is present (or with Opel models under Chevrolet and Vauxhall brand), GM has a campaign featuring a General Motors Astra, an Opel Meriva, and a General Motors Zafira as characters in the world of Cars, including TV ads made by Pixar, with the Opel models interacting with Lightning McQueen, Mater and Ramone.

The first ad involved the Opels coming to Radiator Springs as tourists. The second involved their failed attempts at auditioning for Mater. In the end the Opels lost the part to the real Mater. In July 2006, greeting card giant Hallmark Cards unveiled its line of 2006 Keepsake Christmas ornaments. Among the collection was an ornament featuring Lightning McQueen and Mater. There is also a Cars children's clothing line, which produces various T-shirts and shorts.

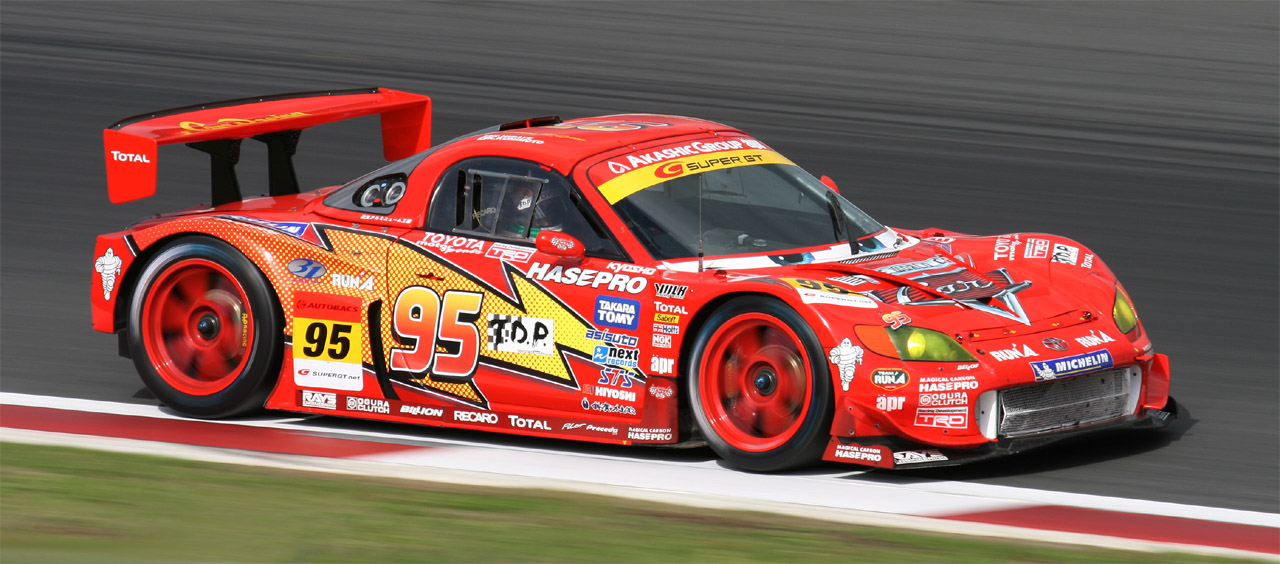
Lightning McQueen apr MR-S

In Japan, Disney Japan and Toyota backed racing team Cars Racing replaced its racing car "Toy Story apr MR-S" and introduced the "Lightning McQueen apr MR-S" for the 2008 Super GT season. The car was based on the Toyota MR-S and the externals of the car were modeled on its of McQueen as much as possible. This include their number change from their original No.101 to McQueen's #95. They won in Race 3 that season.

In 2026, Disney announced a partnership with Formula One at D23 to celebrate the Cars franchise's 20th anniversary. A Lightning McQueen track vehicle and themed safety car was present at the 2026 Italian Grand Prix, which fell alongside a 20th anniversary theatrical re-release of the original movie.

== Theme park attractions ==
=== Cars Land ===
Cars Land is a 12-acre land located at Disney California Adventure which contains an entire full-sized recreation of the town of Radiator Springs from the Cars franchise. The land includes restaurants, shops, and three rides: Mater's Junkyard Jamboree, Luigi's Rollickin' Roadsters, and Radiator Springs Racers, the main "E-Ticket" attraction which is one of the most expensive rides Disney has ever built at a cost of over $200 million. Radiator Springs Racers lets guests race against each other around Ornament Valley while encountering several Cars characters. Cars Land opened on June 15, 2012, with the completion of Disney California Adventure's expansion along with Buena Vista Street.

Luigi's Rollickin' Roadsters opened on March 7, 2016, and replaced Luigi's Flying Tires, an original Cars Land ride which closed in February 2015 after complaints and injuries.

=== Cars Four Wheels Rally ===
Cars Four Wheels Rally (French: Cars Quatre Roues Rallye) is an attraction in Toon Studio at Disney Adventure World at Disneyland Paris in 2007. The ride opened one year after Cars showed its first screening on June 9, 2006. The attraction's setting is car service station in the small town of Radiator Springs located in the desert. The attraction is surrounded by boulders which imitates the rocky formations of the Grand Canyon. The ride system is a highly themed Zamperla Demolition Derby.

Riders begin the attraction by sitting down in one of the generic car-shaped vehicles. The vehicles are located on one of the four spinning plateaus. The attraction's layout is similar to The Whirlpool at Tokyo DisneySea, as the vehicles automatically change from one spinning plateau to the next. The vehicles change plateaus while carrying out the rotation inversion of eight separate vehicles. Cars Race Rally was the first operating Disney ride themed to the Cars franchise.

=== Lightning McQueen's Racing Academy ===
Lightning McQueen's Racing Academy was a living character show attraction hosted by Lightning McQueen located in Sunset Boulevard in Disney's Hollywood Studios that opened on March 31, 2019. Lightning McQueen's Racing Academy was the first of many new attractions coming to Hollywood Studios, part of its shift from studio-like attractions to attractions featuring Disney properties such as Star Wars, Pixar, and Marvel.

Much like the existing Monsters, Inc. Laugh Floor in Magic Kingdom, Turtle Talk with Crush in several Disney parks (including Epcot), and Stitch Encounter in the non-American Disney parks, Lightning McQueen's Racing Academy let guests interact with the character. The other attractions have actors voice the characters, which are manipulated via digital puppetry — the manipulation of digital animated figures in real time.

While the other cars of the Cars films — Mater, Sally Carrera, and Cruz Ramirez, for instance — appeared on screens during the show, Lightning appeared in physical car form.

In September 2024, it was announced that the show would be closed on October 7, 2024, to make way for a Disney Villains-themed stage show, Disney Villains: Unfairly Ever After, which was opened on May 27, 2025, in the Sunset Showcase Theater.

=== Piston Peak National Park ===
In August 2024, it was announced that Rivers of America and Tom Sawyer Island in Magic Kingdom would be closed in 2025 to make way for a Frontierland redevelopment, themed to the American wilderness from the Cars franchise. As such, the Liberty Belle Riverboat, was planned to stop operating as well. In June 2025, it was announced that the Rivers of America and Tom Sawyer Island in Frontierland and the Liberty Belle in Liberty Square would close on July 7, 2025, to make way for Piston Peak National Park, which is inspired by a location featured in Planes: Fire & Rescue and will include two attractions; Miss Fritter's Daredevil Spin-Along and Cars Ridge Run Rally.
