= The Autobots =

2015 Chinese animated mockbuster film

- Chinese theatrical release poster

Chinese name
- Traditional Chinese: 汽車人總動員
- Simplified Chinese: 汽车人总动员
Transcriptions
- Directed by: Zhuo Jianrong
- Production company: Bluemtv
- Distributed by: G-Point
- Release date: July 4, 2015 (China)
- Running time: 85 minutes
- Country: China
- Language: Chinese/Mandarin
- Budget: CN¥3 million
- Box office: CN¥6 million

The Autobots (simplified Chinese: 汽车人总动员; traditional Chinese: 汽車人總動員; pinyin: Qìchērén Zǒngdòngyuán) is a 2015 Chinese animated motorsports mockbuster film directed by Zhuo Jianrong. It was theatrically released in China on July 4, 2015. The film received heavy criticism for its plot, animation quality, characters, and being a direct plagiarism and ripoff of Pixar's Cars 2.

== Production ==
The production company and filmmaker stated that it was an independently produced film, while several critics and people who watched the film accused it of being copied from Disney and Pixar's Cars franchise (with the characters looking like those from Cars). Shen Lu, Katie Hunt, and Anna Hsieh of CNN stated that the Chinese title of the film was similar to the mainland Chinese title of Cars (赛车总动员; Sàichē Zǒngdòngyuán).

== Plot ==
The film follows Kaka, a brilliant young boy and inventor who successfully develops a groundbreaking, intelligent "human-car dialogue" control system. This advanced system allows humans and automobiles to seamlessly communicate and interact with one another.

With the assistance of his assistant, Dingding, Kaka implements this technology into three distinct, sentient racing cars that he designs himself: K1, K2, and K3. Together, the inventor, his assistant, and the three customizable vehicles establish a bond and work as a team.

Throughout their adventures, Kaka and the vehicles explore the boundaries of machine intelligence and human-car interaction. The trio of cars frequently engages in high-stakes races, learning valuable lessons about teamwork, friendship, and the responsibilities of advanced artificial intelligence while defending their technology from outside competitive threats.

== Copyright infringement lawsuit ==
In July 2016, The Walt Disney Company filed a copyright case through the Shanghai Pudong New Area People's Court. On December 29, 2016, the court ruled in favor of Disney, fining Bluemtv and G-Point $190,000 and ordering them to cease copyright infringement.

== Cancelled sequel ==
A sequel for the film, The Autobots 2: Counterattack, was scheduled for release in summer 2017. However, the sequel was canceled due to The Walt Disney Company winning a copyright case. The latest information about the sequel announcement is from 2016.
